= History of disco =

Disco
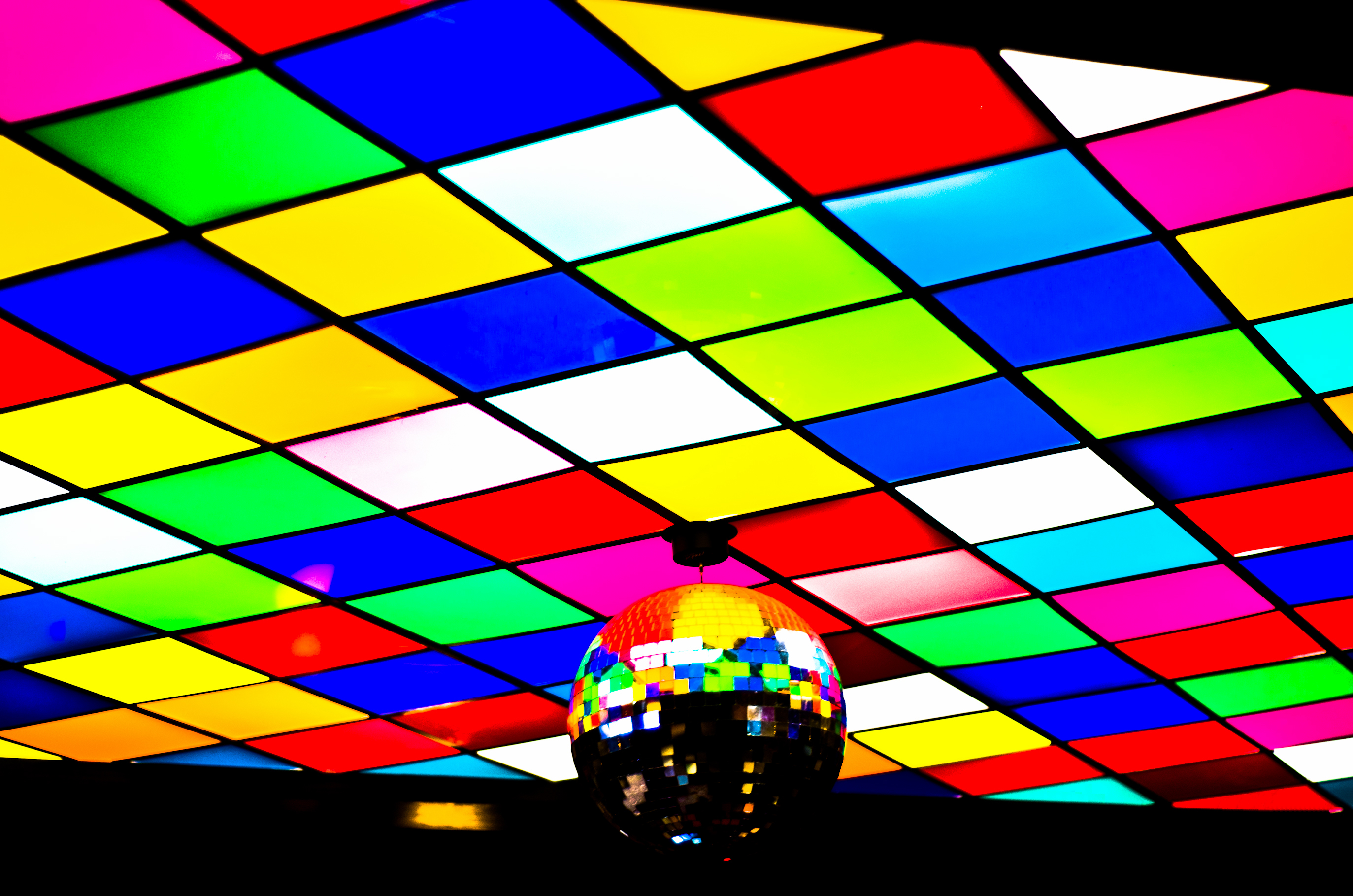
- Ceiling of a discothèque
- Stylistic origins: Philadelphia soul; funk; psychedelic soul; pop
- Cultural origins: Late 1960s – early 1970s, Philadelphia and New York City
- Derivative forms: Europop; dance-pop; house; post-disco; post-punk; hip-hop; new wave; synth-pop; acid jazz

Subgenres
- Italo disco; Cosmic disco; Eurodisco; Space disco; Hi-NRG; Disco polo; Nu-disco

Fusion genres
- Dance-punk; Dance-rock; French house; Disco-pop; Funky house; Future funk; Disco-rap

Regional scenes
- Europe (Italy; Poland); Philippines

Local scenes
- Los Angeles; Miami; Montreal; New York City; San Francisco; Washington

Other topics
- Discothèques; list of artists; old-school hip hop

Disco originated from the dance floors of the 1940s and 1950s, evolving from venues that replaced live bands with recorded music, particularly in clubs across Europe and the United States. By the 1960s and early 1970s, it matured into a distinct musical culture rooted in African-American and Latin music—incorporating genres like soul, funk, and rhythm and blues—and fueled by the inclusive, high-energy atmosphere of underground scenes like New York’s The Loft.

The genre reached its mainstream zenith in the late 1970s, largely driven by the massive success of the film Saturday Night Fever and the iconic sound of artists like the Bee Gees and Donna Summer. While disco faced a sharp, often controversial decline at the start of the 1980s, its influence proved enduring; its innovative use of synthesizers, drum machines, and extended remixes laid the foundational blueprint for modern electronic dance music, including house and techno.

== 1940s–1960s: First discotheques ==
Disco was mostly developed from music that was popular on the dance floor in clubs that started playing records instead of having a live band. The first discotheques mostly played swing music. Later on, uptempo rhythm and blues became popular in American clubs and northern soul and glam rock records in the UK. In the early 1940s, nightclubs in Paris resorted to playing jazz records during the Nazi occupation.

Régine Zylberberg claimed to have started the first discotheque and to have been the first club DJ in 1953 in the "Whisky à Go-Go" in Paris. She installed a dance floor with colored lights and two turntables so she could play records without having a gap in the music. In October 1959, the owner of the Scotch Club in Aachen, West Germany chose to install a record player for the opening night instead of hiring a live band. The patrons were unimpressed until a young reporter, who happened to be covering the opening of the club, impulsively took control of the record player and introduced the records that he chose to play. Klaus Quirini later claimed to thus have been the world's first nightclub DJ.

== 1960s–1974: Precursors and early disco music ==
During the 1960s, discotheque dancing became a European trend that was enthusiastically picked up by the American press. At this time, when the discotheque culture from Europe became popular in the United States, several music genres with danceable rhythms rose to popularity and evolved into different sub-genres: rhythm and blues (originated in the 1940s), soul (late 1950s and 1960s), funk (mid-1960s) and go-go (mid-1960s and 1970s; more than "disco", the word "go-go" originally indicated a music club). Musical genres that were primarily performed by African-American musicians would influence much of early disco.

Also during the 1960s, the Motown record label developed its own approach, described as having "1) simply structured songs with sophisticated melodies and chord changes, 2) a relentless four-beat drum pattern, 3) a gospel use of background voices, vaguely derived from the style of the Impressions, 4) a regular and sophisticated use of both horns and strings, 5) lead singers who were halfway between pop and gospel music, 6) a group of accompanying musicians who were among the most dextrous, knowledgeable, and brilliant in all of popular music (Motown bassists have long been the envy of white rock bassists) and 7) a trebly style of mixing that relied heavily on electronic limiting and equalizing (boosting the high range frequencies) to give the overall product a distinctive sound, particularly effective for broadcast over AM radio." Motown had many hits with disco elements by acts like Eddie Kendricks ("Girl You Need a Change of Mind" in 1972, "Keep on Truckin'" in 1973, "Boogie Down" in 1974).

At the end of the 1960s, musicians, and audiences from the Black, Italian, and Latino communities adopted several traits from the hippie and psychedelia subcultures. They included using music venues with a loud, overwhelming sound, free-form dancing, trippy lighting, colorful costumes, and the use of hallucinogenic drugs. In addition, the perceived positivity, lack of irony, and earnestness of the hippies informed proto-disco music like MFSB's album Love Is the Message. Partly through the success of Jimi Hendrix, psychedelic elements that were popular in rock music of the late 1960s found their way into soul and early funk music and formed the subgenre psychedelic soul. Examples can be found in the music of the Chambers Brothers, George Clinton with his Parliament-Funkadelic collective, Sly and the Family Stone, and the productions of Norman Whitfield with The Temptations.

The long instrumental introductions and detailed orchestration found in psychedelic soul tracks by the Temptations are also considered as cinematic soul. In the early 1970s, Curtis Mayfield and Isaac Hayes scored hits with cinematic soul songs that were actually composed for movie soundtracks: "Superfly" (1972) and "Theme from Shaft" (1971). The latter is sometimes regarded as an early disco song. From the mid-1960s to early 1970s, Philadelphia soul developed as a sub-genre that also had lavish percussion, lush string orchestra arrangements, and expensive record production processes. In the early 1970s, the Philadelphia soul productions by Gamble and Huff evolved from the simpler arrangements of the late-1960s into a style featuring lush strings, thumping basslines, and sliding hi-hat rhythms. These elements would become typical for disco music and are found in several of the hits they produced in the early 1970s:

- "Love Train" by the O'Jays (with MFSB as the backup band) was released in 1972 and topped the Billboard Hot 100 in March 1973
- "The Love I Lost" by Harold Melvin & the Blue Notes (1973)
- "Now That We Found Love" by the O'Jays (1973), later a hit for Third World in 1978
- "TSOP (The Sound of Philadelphia)" by MFSB, which consisted of the instrumental accompaniment to the theme for Soul Train (with some vocal embellishments by The Three Degrees retained) and was a #1 hit on the Billboard Hot 100 in 1974

Other early disco tracks that helped shape disco and became popular on the dance floors of (underground) discotheque clubs and parties include:

- "Jungle Fever" by The Chakachas was first released in Belgium in 1971 and later released in the U.S. in 1972, where it reached #8 on the Billboard Hot 100 that same year
- "Soul Makossa" by Manu Dibango was first released in France in 1972; it was picked up by the underground disco scene in New York and subsequently got a proper release in the U.S., reaching #35 on the Hot 100 in 1973
- "The Night" by the Four Seasons was released in 1972, but was not immediately popular; it appealed to the Northern soul scene and became a hit in the UK in 1975
- "Love's Theme" by the Love Unlimited Orchestra, conducted by Barry White, an instrumental song originally featured on Under the Influence of... Love Unlimited in July 1973 from which it was culled as a single in November of that year; subsequently, the conductor included it on his own debut album
- "Sound Your Funky Horn" by KC and the Sunshine Band in 1974
- "Rock Your Baby" by George McCrae in 1974
- "Do It ('Til You're Satisfied)" by B.T. Express in 1974
- "Boogie Down" by Eddie Kendricks in 1974
- "If You Talk In Your Sleep" by Elvis Presley in 1974.

Early disco was dominated by record producers and labels such as Salsoul Records (Ken, Stanley, and Joseph Cayre), West End Records (Mel Cheren), Casablanca (Neil Bogart), and Prelude (Marvin Schlachter). The genre was also shaped by Tom Moulton, who wanted to extend the enjoyment of dance songs — thus creating the extended mix or "remix", going from a three-minute 45 rpm single to the much longer 12" record. Other influential DJs and remixers who helped to establish what became known as the "disco sound" included David Mancuso, Nicky Siano, Shep Pettibone, Larry Levan, Walter Gibbons, and Chicago-based Frankie Knuckles. Frankie Knuckles was not only an important disco DJ; he also helped to develop house music in the 1980s.

Disco hit the television airwaves as part of the music/dance variety show Soul Train in 1971 hosted by Don Cornelius, then Marty Angelo's Disco Step-by-Step Television Show in 1975, Steve Marcus's Disco Magic/Disco 77, Eddie Rivera's Soap Factory, and Merv Griffin's Dance Fever, hosted by Deney Terrio, who is credited with teaching actor John Travolta to dance for his role in the film Saturday Night Fever (1977), as well as DANCE, based out of Columbia, South Carolina.

In 1974, New York City's WPIX-FM premiered the first disco radio show.

=== Early disco culture in the United States ===
In the 1970s, the key counterculture of the 1960s, the hippie movement, was fading away. The economic prosperity of the previous decade had declined, and unemployment, inflation, and crime rates had soared. Political issues like the backlash from the Civil Rights Movement culminating in the form of race riots, the Vietnam War, the assassinations of Dr. Martin Luther King Jr. and John F. Kennedy, and the Watergate scandal, left many feeling disillusioned and hopeless. The start of the '70s was marked by a shift in the consciousness of the American people: the rise of the feminist movement, identity politics, gangs, etc. very much shaped this era. Disco music and disco dancing provided an escape from negative social and economic issues. Yet, Bench Ansfield argues that disco also reflected those social currents: for instance, in the genre's frequent reference to fire and heat during a decade when American cities were burning down en masse.

In Beautiful Things in Popular Culture, Simon Frith highlights the sociability of disco and its roots in 1960s counterculture. "The driving force of the New York underground dance scene in which disco was forged was not simply that city's complex ethnic and sexual culture but also a 1960s notion of community, pleasure and generosity that can only be described as hippie", he says. "The best disco music contained within it a remarkably powerful sense of collective euphoria." The non-partnered dance style of disco music allowed people of all races and sexual orientations to enjoy the dancefloor atmosphere.

The explosion of disco is often claimed to be found in the private dance parties held by New York City DJ David Mancuso's home that became known as The Loft, an invitation-only non-commercial underground club that inspired many others. He organized the first major party in his Manhattan home on Valentine's Day 1970 with the name "Love Saves The Day". After some months the parties became weekly events and Mancuso continued to give regular parties into the 1990s. Mancuso required that the music played had to be soulful, rhythmic, and impart words of hope, redemption, or pride.

When Mancuso threw his first informal house parties, the gay community (which made up much of The Loft's attendee roster) was often harassed in the gay bars and dance clubs, with many gay men carrying bail money with them to gay bars. But at The Loft and many other early, private discotheques, they could dance together without fear of police action thanks to Mancuso's underground, yet legal, policies. Vince Aletti described it "like going to party, completely mixed, racially and sexually, where there wasn't any sense of someone being more important than anyone else," and Alex Rosner reiterated this saying "It was probably about sixty percent black and seventy percent gay. ... There was a mix of sexual orientation, there was a mix of races, mix of economic groups. A real mix, where the common denominator was music."

Film critic Roger Ebert called the popular embrace of disco's exuberant dance moves an escape from "the general depression and drabness of the political and musical atmosphere of the late seventies." Pauline Kael, writing about the disco-themed film Saturday Night Fever, said the film and disco itself touched on "something deeply romantic, the need to move, to dance, and the need to be who you'd like to be. Nirvana is the dance; when the music stops, you return to being ordinary."

=== Early disco culture in the United Kingdom ===
In the late 1960s, uptempo soul with heavy beats and some associated dance styles and fashion were picked up in the British mod scene and formed the northern soul movement. Originating at venues such as the Twisted Wheel in Manchester, it quickly spread to other UK dancehalls and nightclubs like the Chateau Impney (Droitwich), Catacombs (Wolverhampton), the Highland Rooms at Blackpool Mecca, Golden Torch (Stoke-on-Trent), and Wigan Casino. As the favoured beat became more uptempo and frantic in the early 1970s, northern soul dancing became more athletic, somewhat resembling the later dance styles of disco and break dancing. Featuring spins, flips, karate kicks, and backdrops, club dancing styles were often inspired by the stage performances of touring American soul acts such as Little Anthony & the Imperials and Jackie Wilson.

In 1974, there were an estimated 25,000 mobile discos and 40,000 professional disc jockeys in the United Kingdom. Mobile discos were hired deejays that brought their own equipment to provide music for special events. Glam rock tracks were popular, with, for example, Gary Glitter's 1972 single "Rock and Roll Part 2" becoming popular on UK dance floors while it did not get much radio airplay.

== 1974–1977: Rise to mainstream ==
From 1974 to 1977, disco music increased in popularity as many disco songs topped the charts. The Hues Corporation's "Rock the Boat" (1974), a US number-one single and million-seller, was one of the early disco songs to reach number one. The same year saw the release of "Kung Fu Fighting", performed by Carl Douglas and produced by Biddu, which reached number one in both the UK and US, and became the best-selling single of the year and one of the best-selling singles of all time with 11 million records sold worldwide, helping to popularize disco to a great extent. Another notable disco success that year was George McCrae's "Rock Your Baby": it became the United Kingdom's first number one disco single.

In the northwestern sections of the United Kingdom, the northern soul explosion, which started in the late 1960s and peaked in 1974, made the region receptive to disco, which the region's disc jockeys were bringing back from New York City. The shift by some DJs to the newer sounds coming from the U.S. resulted in a split in the scene, whereby some abandoned the 1960s soul and pushed a modern soul sound which tended to be more closely aligned with disco than soul.

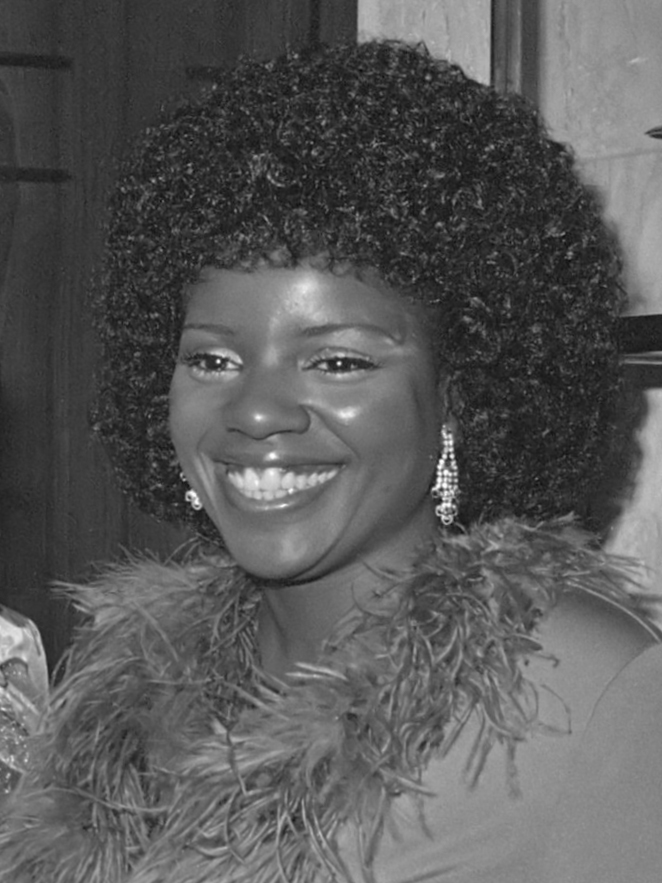
Gloria Gaynor in 1976

In 1975, Gloria Gaynor released her first vinyl album, which included a remake of the Jackson 5's "Never Can Say Goodbye" (which, in fact, is also the album title) and two other songs, "Honey Bee" and her disco version of "Reach Out (I'll Be There)". The album first topped the Billboard disco/dance charts in November 1974. Later in 1978, Gaynor's number-one disco song was "I Will Survive", which was seen as a symbol of female strength and a gay anthem, like her further disco hit, a 1983 remake of "I Am What I Am". In 1979 she released "Let Me Know (I Have a Right)", a single which gained popularity in the civil rights movements. Also in 1975, Vincent Montana Jr.'s Salsoul Orchestra contributed with their Latin-flavored orchestral dance song "Salsoul Hustle", reaching number four on the Billboard Dance Chart; their 1976 hits were "Tangerine" and "Nice 'n' Naasty", the first being a cover of a 1941 song.

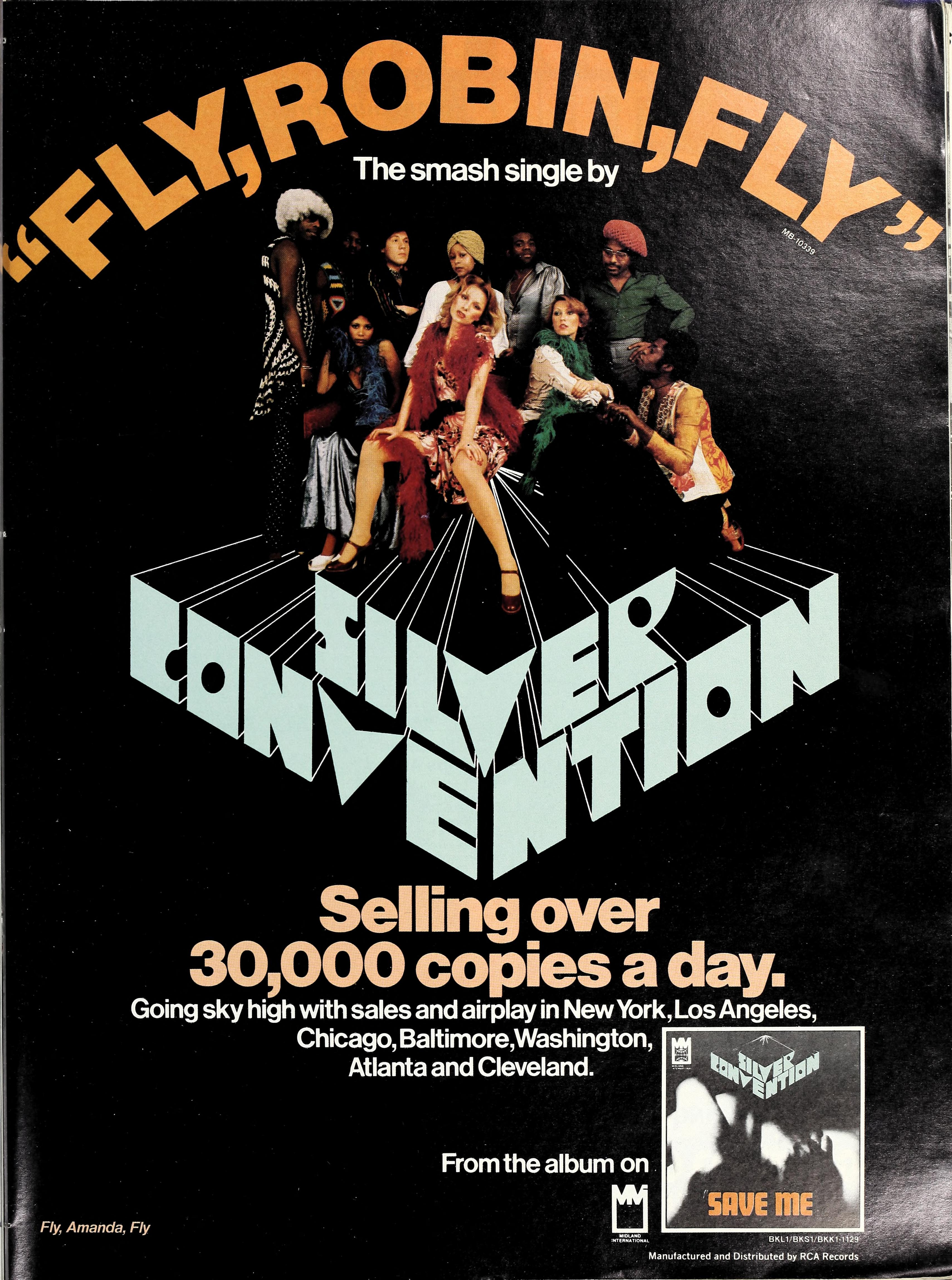
Advertisement for Silver Convention's "Fly, Robin, Fly", October 18, 1975

Songs such as Van McCoy's 1975 "The Hustle" and the humorous Joe Tex 1977 "Ain't Gonna Bump No More (With No Big Fat Woman)" gave names to the popular disco dances "the Bump" and "the Hustle". Other notable early successful disco songs include Barry White's "You're the First, the Last, My Everything" (1974); Labelle's "Lady Marmalade" (1974)'; Disco-Tex and the Sex-O-Lettes' "Get Dancin'" (1974); Earth, Wind & Fire's "Shining Star" (1975); Silver Convention's "Fly, Robin, Fly" (1975) and "Get Up and Boogie" (1976); Vicki Sue Robinson's "Turn the Beat Around" (1976); and "More, More, More" (1976) by Andrea True (a former pornographic actress during the Golden Age of Porn, an era largely contemporaneous with the height of disco).

Formed by Harry Wayne Casey (a.k.a. "KC") and Richard Finch, Miami's KC and the Sunshine Band had a string of disco-definitive top-five singles between 1975 and 1977, including "Get Down Tonight", "That's the Way (I Like It)", "(Shake, Shake, Shake) Shake Your Booty", "I'm Your Boogie Man", "Boogie Shoes", and "Keep It Comin' Love". In this period, rock bands like the English Electric Light Orchestra featured in their songs a violin sound that became a staple of disco music, as in the 1975 hit "Evil Woman", although the genre was correctly described as orchestral rock.

Other disco producers such as Tom Moulton took ideas and techniques from dub music (which came with the increased Jamaican migration to New York City in the 1970s) to provide alternatives to the "four on the floor" style that dominated. DJ Larry Levan utilized styles from dub and jazz and remixing techniques to create early versions of house music that sparked the genre.

=== Motown turning disco ===
Norman Whitfield was an influential producer and songwriter at Motown records, renowned for creating innovative "psychedelic soul" songs with many hits for Marvin Gaye, The Velvelettes, The Temptations, and Gladys Knight & the Pips. From around the production of the Temptations album Cloud Nine in 1968, he incorporated some psychedelic influences and started to produce longer, dance-friendly tracks, with more room for elaborate rhythmic instrumental parts. An example of such a long psychedelic soul track is "Papa Was a Rollin' Stone", which appeared as a single edit of almost seven minutes and an approximately 12-minute-long 12" version in 1972. By the early 1970s, many of Whitfield's productions evolved more and more towards funk and disco, as heard on albums by The Undisputed Truth and the 1973 album G.I.T.: Get It Together by The Jackson 5. The Undisputed Truth, a Motown recording act assembled by Whitfield to experiment with his psychedelic soul production techniques, found success with their 1971 song "Smiling Faces Sometimes". Their disco single "You + Me = Love" (number 43) was produced by Whitfield and made number 2 on the US dance chart in 1976.

In 1975, Whitfield left Motown and founded his own label Whitfield records, on which also "You + Me = Love" was released. Whitfield produced some more disco hits, including "Car Wash" (1976) by Rose Royce from the album soundtrack to the 1976 film Car Wash. In 1977, singer, songwriter, and producer Willie Hutch, who had been signed to Motown since 1970, now signed with Whitfield's new label, and scored a successful disco single with his song "In and Out" in 1982.

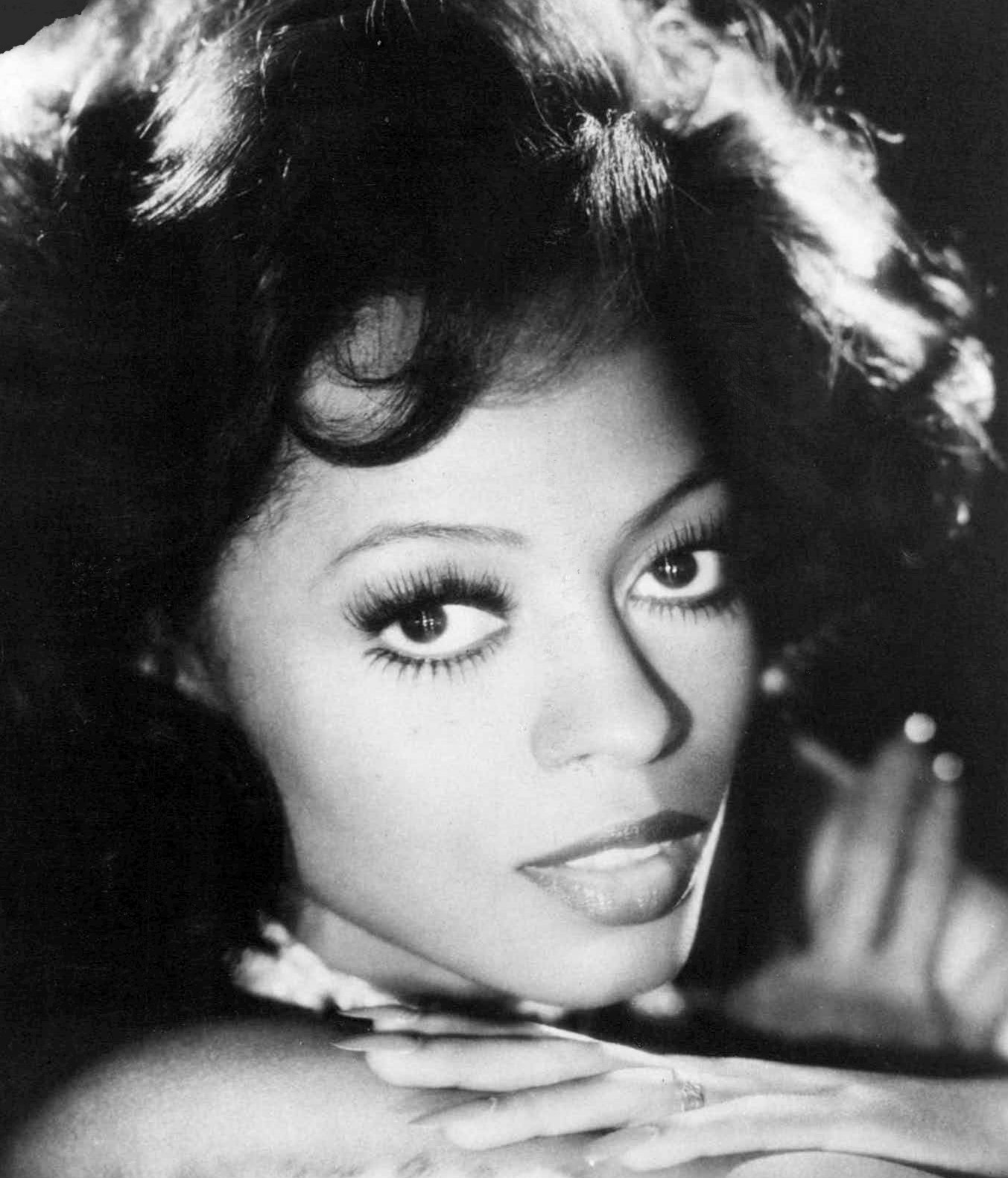
Diana Ross in 1976

Other Motown artists turned to disco as well. Diana Ross embraced the disco sound with her successful 1976 outing "Love Hangover" from her self-titled album. Her 1980 dance classics "Upside Down" and "I'm Coming Out" were written and produced by Nile Rodgers and Bernard Edwards of the group Chic. The Supremes, the group that made Ross famous, scored a handful of hits in the disco clubs without her, most notably 1976's "I'm Gonna Let My Heart Do the Walking" and, their last charted single before disbanding, 1977's "You're My Driving Wheel".

At the request of Motown that he produce songs in the disco genre, Marvin Gaye released "Got to Give It Up" in 1978, despite his dislike of disco. He vowed not to record any songs in the genre and actually wrote the song as a parody. However, several of Gaye's songs have disco elements, including "I Want You" (1975). Stevie Wonder released the disco single "Sir Duke" in 1977 as a tribute to Duke Ellington, the influential jazz legend who had died in 1974. Smokey Robinson left the Motown group The Miracles for a solo career in 1972 and released his third solo album A Quiet Storm in 1975, which spawned and lent its name to the "Quiet Storm" musical programming format and subgenre of R&B. It contained the disco single "Baby That's Backatcha". Other Motown artists who scored disco hits were Robinson's former group, the Miracles, with "Love Machine" (1975), Eddie Kendricks with "Keep On Truckin'" (1973), the Originals with "Down to Love Town" (1976), and Thelma Houston with her cover of the Harold Melvin and the Blue Notes song "Don't Leave Me This Way" (1976). The label continued to release successful songs into the 1980s, with Rick James's "Super Freak" (1981) and the Commodores' "Lady (You Bring Me Up)" (1981).

Several of Motown's solo artists who left the label went on to have successful disco songs. Mary Wells, Motown's first female superstar with her signature song "My Guy" (written by Smokey Robinson), abruptly left the label in 1964. She briefly reappeared on the charts with the disco song "Gigolo" in 1980. Jimmy Ruffin, the elder brother of the Temptations lead singer David Ruffin, was also signed to Motown and released his most successful and well-known song "What Becomes of the Brokenhearted" as a single in 1966. Ruffin eventually left the record label in the mid-1970s, but saw success with the 1980 disco song "Hold On (To My Love)", which was written and produced by Robin Gibb of the Bee Gees, for his album Sunrise. Edwin Starr, known for his Motown protest song "War" (1970), reentered the charts in 1979 with a pair of disco songs, "Contact" and "H.A.P.P.Y. Radio". Kiki Dee became the first white British singer to sign with Motown in the US, and released one album, Great Expectations (1970), and two singles "The Day Will Come Between Sunday and Monday" (1970) and "Love Makes the World Go Round" (1971), the latter giving her first-ever chart entry (number 87 on the US Chart). She soon left the company and signed with Elton John's The Rocket Record Company, and in 1976 had her biggest and best-known single, "Don't Go Breaking My Heart", a disco duet with John. The song was intended as an affectionate disco-style pastiche of the Motown sound, in particular the various duets recorded by Marvin Gaye with Tammi Terrell and Kim Weston.

Many Motown groups who had left the record label charted with disco songs. The Jackson 5, one of Motown's premier acts in the early 1970s, left the record company in 1975 (Jermaine Jackson, however, remained with the label) after successful songs like "I Want You Back" (1969) and "ABC" (1970), and even the disco song "Dancing Machine" (1974). Renamed as "the Jacksons" (as Motown owned the name "the Jackson 5"), they went on to find success with disco songs like "Blame It on the Boogie" (1978), "Shake Your Body (Down to the Ground)" (1979), and "Can You Feel It" (1981) on the Epic label.

The Isley Brothers, whose short tenure at the company had produced the song "This Old Heart of Mine (Is Weak for You)" in 1966, went on release successful disco songs like "It's a Disco Night (Rock Don't Stop)" (1979). Gladys Knight & the Pips, who recorded the most successful version of "I Heard It Through the Grapevine" (1967) before Marvin Gaye, scored commercially successful singles such as "Baby, Don't Change Your Mind" (1977) and "Bourgie', Bourgie'" (1980) in the disco era. The Detroit Spinners were also signed to the Motown label and saw success with the Stevie Wonder-produced song "It's a Shame" in 1970. They left soon after, on the advice of fellow Detroit native Aretha Franklin, to Atlantic Records, and there had disco songs like "The Rubberband Man" (1976). In 1979, they released a successful cover of Elton John's "Are You Ready for Love", as well as a medley of the Four Seasons' song "Working My Way Back to You" and Michael Zager's "Forgive Me, Girl". The Four Seasons themselves were briefly signed to Motown's MoWest label, a short-lived subsidiary for R&B and soul artists based on the West Coast, and there the group produced one album, Chameleon (1972), to little commercial success in the US. However, one single, "The Night", was released in Britain in 1975 and, thanks to popularity from the Northern soul circuit, reached number seven on the UK Singles Chart. The Four Seasons left Motown in 1974 and went on to have disco hits with their songs "Who Loves You" and "December, 1963 (Oh, What a Night)" (both 1975) for Warner Curb Records.

=== Euro disco ===
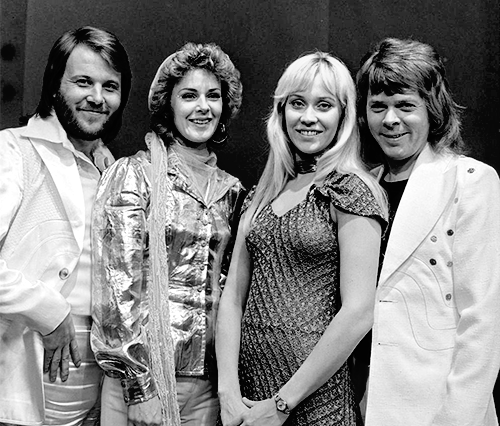
ABBA in 1974

By far the most successful Euro disco act was ABBA (1972–1982). This Swedish quartet, which sang primarily in English, found success with singles such as "Waterloo" (1974), "Take a Chance on Me" (1978), "Gimme! Gimme! Gimme! (A Man After Midnight)" (1979), "Super Trouper" (1980), and their signature smash hit "Dancing Queen" (1976).

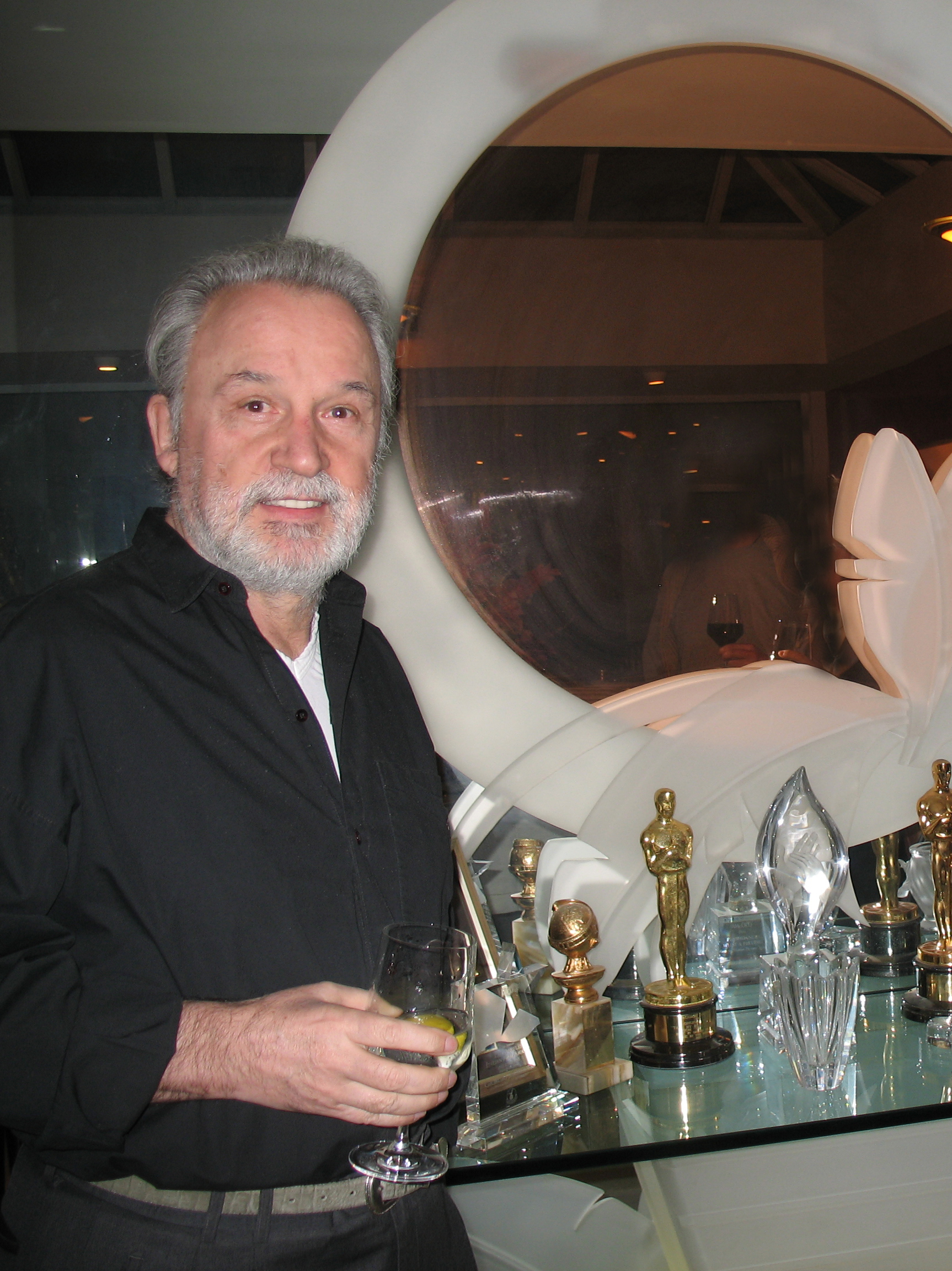
Italian composer Giorgio Moroder is known as the "Father of Disco".

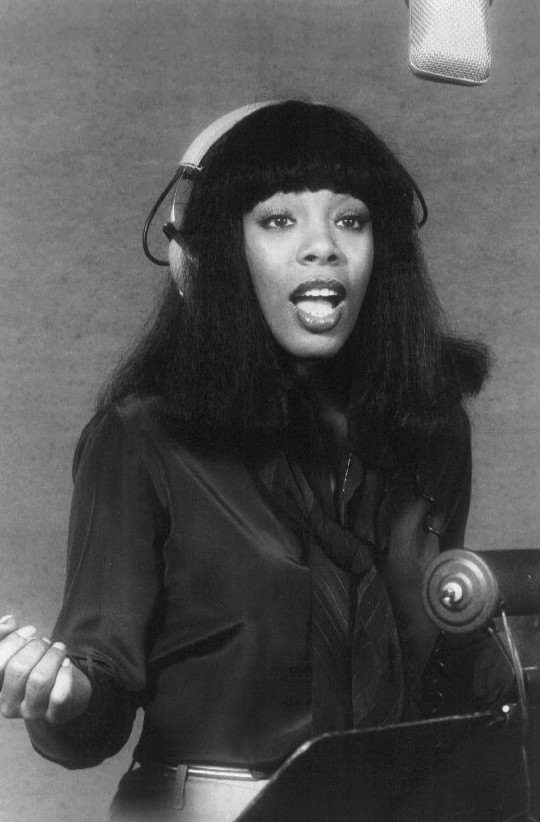
Donna Summer in 1977

In the 1970s, Munich, West Germany, music producers Giorgio Moroder and Pete Bellotte made a decisive contribution to disco music with a string of hits for Donna Summer, which became known as the "Munich Sound". In 1975, Summer suggested the lyric "Love to Love You Baby" to Moroder and Bellotte, who turned the lyric into a full disco song. The final product, which contained the vocalizations of a series of simulated orgasms, initially was not intended for release, but when Moroder played it in the clubs it caused a sensation and he released it. The song became an international hit, reaching the charts in many European countries and the US (No. 2). It has been described as the arrival of the expression of raw female sexual desire in pop music. A nearly 17-minute 12-inch single was released. The 12-inch single became and remains a standard in discos today.

Donna Summer's "Love to Love You Baby" peaking on the Billboard charts at No.2 in 1976, is considered a feminist anthem and staple in the genre. Billboard recently ranked the song #1 on their list of "The 34 Top Disco Songs of All Time." Summer is featured at all top six spots on the list.

In 1976 Donna Summer's version of "Could It Be Magic" brought disco further into the mainstream. In 1977 Summer, Moroder and Bellotte further released "I Feel Love", as the B-side of "Can't We Just Sit Down (And Talk It Over)", which revolutionized dance music with its mostly electronic production and was a massive worldwide success, spawning the Hi-NRG subgenre. Giorgio Moroder was described by AllMusic as "one of the principal architects of the disco sound". Another successful disco music project by Moroder at that time was Munich Machine (1976–1980).

Boney M. (1974–1986) was a West German Euro disco group of four West Indian singers and dancers masterminded by record producer Frank Farian. Boney M. charted worldwide with such songs as "Daddy Cool" (1976) "Ma Baker" (1977) and "Rivers Of Babylon" (1978). Another successful West German Euro disco recording act was Silver Convention (1974–1979). The German group Kraftwerk also had an influence on Euro disco.

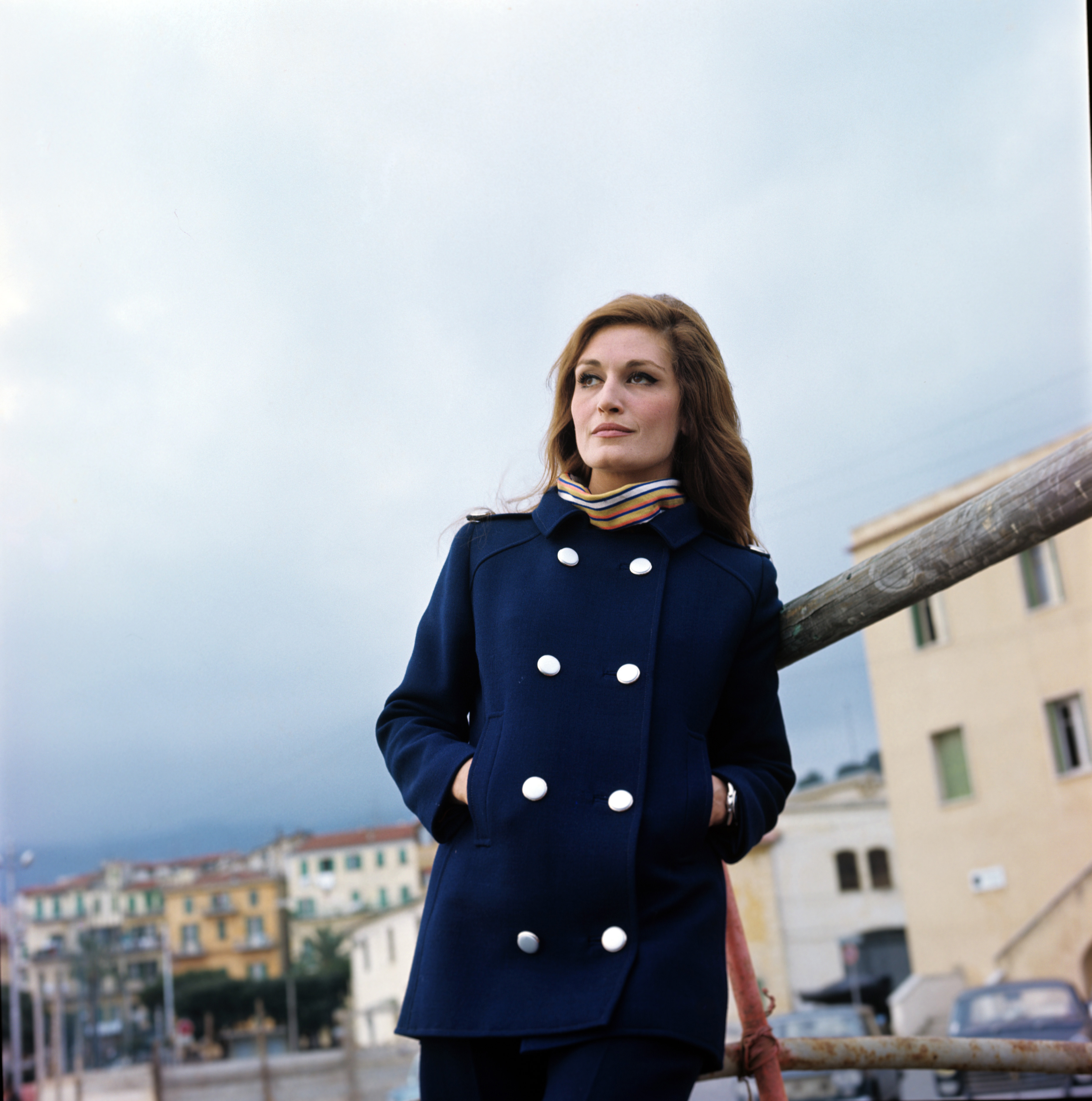
Dalida in 1967

In France, Dalida released "J'attendrai" ("I Will Wait") in 1975, which also became successful in Canada, Europe, and Japan. Dalida adjusted herself to disco and released at least a dozen of songs that charted in the top 10 in Europe. Claude François, who re-invented himself as the "king of French disco", released "La plus belle chose du monde", a French version of the Bee Gees song "Massachusetts", which became successful in Canada and Europe and "Alexandrie Alexandra" was posthumously released on the day of his burial and became a worldwide success. Cerrone's early songs, "Love in C Minor" (1976), "Supernature" (1977), and "Give Me Love" (1978) were successful in the US and Europe. Another Euro disco act was the French diva Amanda Lear, where Euro disco sound is most heard in "Enigma (Give a Bit of Mmh to Me)" (1978). French producer Alec Costandinos assembled the Eurodisco group Love & Kisses (1977–1982).

In Italy Raffaella Carrà was the most successful Euro disco act, alongside La Bionda, Hermanas Goggi (Loretta and Daniela Goggi) and Oliver Onions. Her greatest international single was "Tanti auguri" ("Best Wishes"), which has become a popular song with gay audiences. The song is also known under its Spanish title "Hay que venir al sur" (which refers to Southern Europe, since the song was recorded and taped in Spain). The Estonian version of the song "Jätke võtmed väljapoole" was performed by Anne Veski. "A far l'amore comincia tu" ("To make love, your move first") was another success for her internationally, known in Spanish as "En el amor todo es empezar", in German as "Liebelei", in French as "Puisque tu l'aimes dis le lui", and in English as "Do It, Do It Again". It was her only entry to the UK Singles Chart, reaching number 9, where she remains a one-hit wonder. In 1977, she recorded another successful single, "Fiesta" ("The Party" in English) originally in Spanish, but then recorded it in French and Italian after the song hit the charts. "A far l'amore comincia tu" has also been covered in Turkish by a Turkish popstar Ajda Pekkan as "Sakın Ha" in 1977.

Recently, Carrà has gained new attention for her appearance as the female dancing soloist in a 1974 TV performance of the experimental gibberish song "Prisencolinensinainciusol" (1973) by Adriano Celentano. A remixed video featuring her dancing went viral on the internet in 2008. In 2008 a video of a performance of her only successful UK single, "Do It, Do It Again", was featured in the Doctor Who episode "Midnight". Rafaella Carrà worked with Bob Sinclar on the new single "Far l'Amore" which was released on YouTube on March 17, 2011. The song charted in different European countries. Also prominent European disco acts are Spargo (band), Time Bandits (band) and Luv' from the Netherlands.

Euro disco continued evolving within the broad mainstream pop music scene, even when disco's popularity sharply declined in the United States, abandoned by major U.S. record labels and producers. Through the influence of Italo disco, it also played a role in the evolution of early house music in the early 1980s and later forms of electronic dance music, including early '90s Eurodance.

== 1977–1979: Pop pre-eminence ==
=== Saturday Night Fever (John Badham, 1977) ===
In December 1977, the film Saturday Night Fever was released. It was a huge success and its soundtrack became one of the best-selling albums of all time. The idea for the film was sparked by a 1976 New York magazine article titled "Tribal Rites of the New Saturday Night" which supposedly chronicled the disco culture in mid-1970s New York City, but was later revealed to have been fabricated. Some critics said the film "mainstreamed" disco, making it more acceptable to heterosexual white males. Many music historians believe the success of the movie and soundtrack extended the life of the disco era by several years.

Organized around the culture of suburban discotheques and the character of Tony Manero, portrayed by John Travolta (which earned him an Academy Award for Best Actor nomination), Saturday Night Fever became a cultural phenomenon that recast the dance floor as a site for patriarchal masculinity and heterosexual courtship. This transformation aligned disco with the interests of the perceived mass market, specifically targeting suburban and Middle American audiences.

The portrayal of the dance floor in Saturday Night Fever marked a reappropriation by straight male culture, turning it into a space for men to showcase their prowess and pursue partners of the opposite sex. The film popularized the hustle, a Latin social dance, reinforcing the centrality of the straight-dancing couple in the disco exchange. Notably, the soundtrack, dominated by the Bee Gees, risked presenting disco as a new incarnation of shrill white pop, deviating from its diverse and inclusive origins.

=== Disco goes mainstream ===
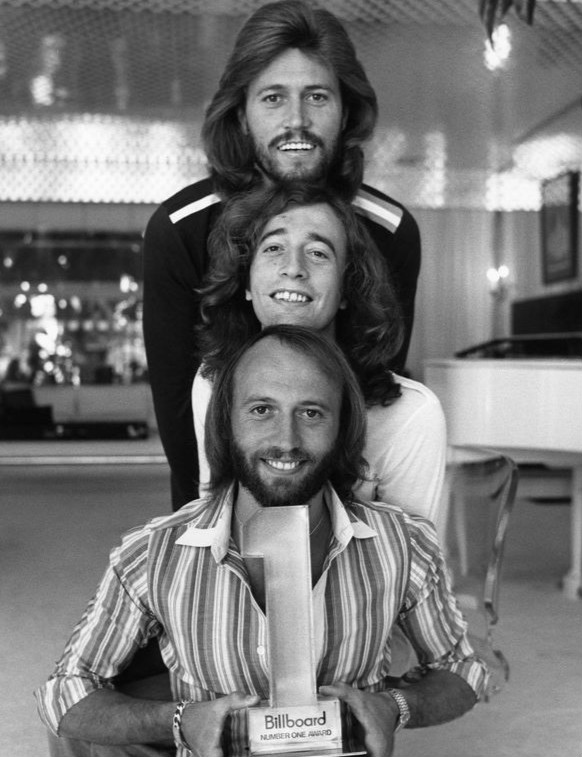
The Bee Gees had several disco hits on the soundtrack to Saturday Night Fever in 1977.

The Bee Gees used Barry Gibb's falsetto to garner hits such as "You Should Be Dancing", "Stayin' Alive", "Night Fever", "More Than A Woman", "Love You Inside Out", and "Tragedy". Andy Gibb, a younger brother to the Bee Gees, followed with similarly styled solo singles such as "I Just Want to Be Your Everything", "(Love Is) Thicker Than Water", and "Shadow Dancing".

In 1978, Donna Summer's multi-million-selling vinyl single disco version of "MacArthur Park" was number one on the Billboard Hot 100 chart for three weeks and was nominated for the Grammy Award for Best Female Pop Vocal Performance. The recording, which was included as part of the "MacArthur Park Suite" on her double live album Live and More, was eight minutes and 40 seconds long on the album. The shorter seven-inch vinyl single version of MacArthur Park was Summer's first single to reach number one on the Hot 100; it does not include the balladic second movement of the song, however. A 2013 remix of "MacArthur Park" by Summer topped the Billboard Dance Charts marking five consecutive decades with a number-one song on the charts. From mid-1978 to late 1979, Summer continued to release singles such as "Last Dance", "Heaven Knows" (with Brooklyn Dreams), "Hot Stuff", "Bad Girls", "Dim All the Lights" and "On the Radio", all very successful songs, landing in the top five or better, on the Billboard pop charts.

The band Chic was formed mainly by guitarist Nile Rodgers—a self-described "street hippie" from late 1960s New York—and bassist Bernard Edwards. Their popular 1978 single, "Le Freak", is regarded as an iconic song of the genre. Other successful songs by Chic include the often-sampled "Good Times" (1979), "I Want Your Love" (1979), and "Everybody Dance" (1979). The group regarded themselves as the disco movement's rock band that made good on the hippie movement's ideals of peace, love, and freedom. Every song they wrote was written with an eye toward giving it "deep hidden meaning" or D.H.M.

Sylvester, a flamboyant and openly gay singer famous for his soaring falsetto voice, scored his biggest disco hits in late 1978 with "You Make Me Feel (Mighty Real)" and "Dance (Disco Heat)". His singing style was said to have influenced the singer Prince. At that time, disco was one of the forms of music most open to gay performers.

The Village People were a singing/dancing group created by Jacques Morali and Henri Belolo to target disco's gay audience. They were known for their onstage costumes of typically male-associated jobs and ethnic minorities and achieved mainstream success with their 1978 hit song "Macho Man". Other songs include "Y.M.C.A." (1979) and "In the Navy" (1979).

Also noteworthy are the Trammps' "Disco Inferno" (1976; 1978 reissue due to the popularity gained from the Saturday Night Fever soundtrack), Heatwave's "Boogie Nights" (1977), Evelyn "Champagne" King's "Shame" (1977), A Taste of Honey's "Boogie Oogie Oogie" (1978), Cheryl Lynn's "Got to Be Real" (1978), Alicia Bridges's "I Love the Nightlife" (1978), Patrick Hernandez's "Born to Be Alive" (1978), Earth, Wind & Fire's "September" (1978) and "Boogie Wonderland" (1979), Peaches & Herb's "Shake Your Groove Thing" (1978), Chaka Khan's "I'm Every Woman" (1978), Sister Sledge's "We Are Family" and "He's the Greatest Dancer" (both 1979), McFadden and Whitehead's "Ain't No Stoppin' Us Now" (1979), Anita Ward's "Ring My Bell" (1979), Kool & the Gang's "Ladies' Night" (1979) and "Celebration" (1980), the Whispers' "And the Beat Goes On" (1979), Stephanie Mills's "What Cha Gonna Do with My Lovin'" (1979), Lipps Inc.'s "Funkytown" (1980), the Brothers Johnson's "Stomp!" (1980), George Benson's "Give Me the Night" (1980), Donna Summer's "Sunset People" (1980), and Walter Murphy's various attempts to bring classical music to the mainstream, most notably the disco song "A Fifth of Beethoven" (1976), which was inspired by Beethoven's fifth symphony.

At the height of its popularity, many non-disco artists recorded songs with disco elements, such as Rod Stewart with his "Da Ya Think I'm Sexy?" in 1979. Even mainstream rock artists adopted elements of disco. Progressive rock group Pink Floyd used disco-like drums and guitar in their song "Another Brick in the Wall, Part 2" (1979), which became their only number-one single in both the US and UK. The Eagles referenced disco with "One of These Nights" (1975) and "Disco Strangler" (1979), Paul McCartney & Wings with "Silly Love Songs" (1976) and "Goodnight Tonight" (1979), Queen with "Another One Bites the Dust" (1980), the Rolling Stones with "Miss You" (1978) and "Emotional Rescue" (1980), Stephen Stills with his album Thoroughfare Gap (1978), Electric Light Orchestra with "Shine a Little Love" and "Last Train to London" (both 1979), Chicago with "Street Player" (1979), the Kinks with "(Wish I Could Fly Like) Superman" (1979), the Grateful Dead with "Shakedown Street", the Who with "Eminence Front" (1982), the Beach Boys with "Here Comes the Night" (1979), Elton John with "Are You Ready for Love" (1979), Blondie with "Heart of Glass" (1979), Jethro Tull with "Warm Sporran" (1979) and the J. Geils Band with "Come Back" (1980). Even hard rock group Kiss jumped in with "I Was Made for Lovin' You" (1979), and Ringo Starr's album Ringo the 4th (1978) features a strong disco influence.

The disco sound was also adopted by artists from other genres, including the 1979 U.S. number one hit "No More Tears (Enough Is Enough)" by easy listening singer Barbra Streisand in a duet with Donna Summer. In country music, in an attempt to appeal to the more mainstream market, artists began to add pop/disco influences to their music. Dolly Parton launched a successful crossover onto the pop/dance charts, with her albums Heartbreaker and Great Balls of Fire containing songs with a disco flair. In particular, a disco remix of the track "Baby I'm Burnin'" peaked at number 15 on the Billboard Dance Club Songs chart; ultimately becoming one of the year's biggest club hits. Additionally, Connie Smith covered Andy Gibb's "I Just Want to Be Your Everything" in 1977, Bill Anderson recorded "Double S" in 1978, and Ronnie Milsap released "Get It Up" and covered blues singer Tommy Tucker's song "Hi-Heel Sneakers" in 1979.

Pre-existing non-disco songs, standards, and TV themes were frequently "disco-ized" in the 1970s, such as the I Love Lucy theme (recorded as "Disco Lucy" by the Wilton Place Street Band), "Aquarela do Brasil" (recorded as "Brazil" by The Ritchie Family), and "Baby Face" (recorded by the Wing and a Prayer Fife and Drum Corps). The rich orchestral accompaniment that became identified with the disco era conjured up the memories of the big band era—which brought out several artists that recorded and disco-ized some big band arrangements, including Perry Como, who re-recorded his 1945 song "Temptation", in 1975, as well as Ethel Merman, who released an album of disco songs entitled The Ethel Merman Disco Album in 1979.

Myron Floren, second-in-command on The Lawrence Welk Show, released a recording of the "Clarinet Polka" entitled "Disco Accordion." Similarly, Bobby Vinton adapted "The Pennsylvania Polka" into a song named "Disco Polka". Easy listening icon Percy Faith, in one of his last recordings, released an album entitled Disco Party (1975) and recorded a disco version of his "Theme from A Summer Place" in 1976. Even classical music was adapted for disco, notably Walter Murphy's "A Fifth of Beethoven" (1976, based on the first movement of Beethoven's 5th Symphony) and "Flight 76" (1976, based on Rimsky-Korsakov's "Flight of the Bumblebee"), and Louis Clark's Hooked On Classics series of albums and singles.

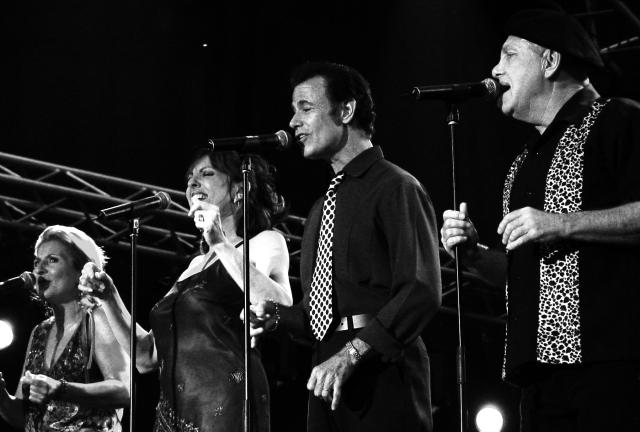
The a cappella jazz group the Manhattan Transfer had a disco hit with the 1979 "Twilight Zone/Twilight Tone" theme.

Many original television and film theme songs of the era also showed a strong disco influence, such as S.W.A.T. (1975), Wonder Woman (1975), Charlie's Angels (1976), NBC Saturday Night At The Movies (1976), The Love Boat (1977), The Donahue Show (1977), CHiPs (1977), The Professionals (1977), Dallas (1978), NBC Sports broadcasts (1978), Kojak (1977), and The Hollywood Squares (1979). Film score songs include Bond '77 and Car Wash.

Disco jingles also made their way into many TV commercials, including Purina's 1979 "Good Mews" cat food commercial and an "IC Light" commercial by Pittsburgh's Iron City Brewing Company.

Furthermore, even as far as theme songs for various Japanese anime and tokusatsu television series have strong disco influence including Mobile Suit Gundam (1979-1980), Astro Boy (1980-1981), Spider-Man (1978-1979), Battle Fever J (1979-1980), and Urusei Yatsura (1981-1986).

=== Parodies ===
Several parodies of the disco style were created. Rick Dees, at the time a radio DJ in Memphis, Tennessee, recorded "Disco Duck" (1976) and "Dis-Gorilla" (1977); Frank Zappa parodied the lifestyles of disco dancers in "Disco Boy" on his 1976 Zoot Allures album and in "Dancin' Fool" on his 1979 Sheik Yerbouti album. "Weird Al" Yankovic's eponymous 1983 debut album includes a disco song called "Gotta Boogie", an extended pun on the similarity of the disco move to the American slang word "booger". Comedian Bill Cosby devoted his entire 1977 album Disco Bill to disco parodies. In 1980, Mad Magazine released a flexi-disc titled Mad Disco featuring six full-length parodies of the genre. Rock and roll songs critical of disco included Bob Seger's "Old Time Rock and Roll" and, especially, the Who's "Sister Disco" (both 1978).

== 1979–1981: Controversy and decline in popularity ==
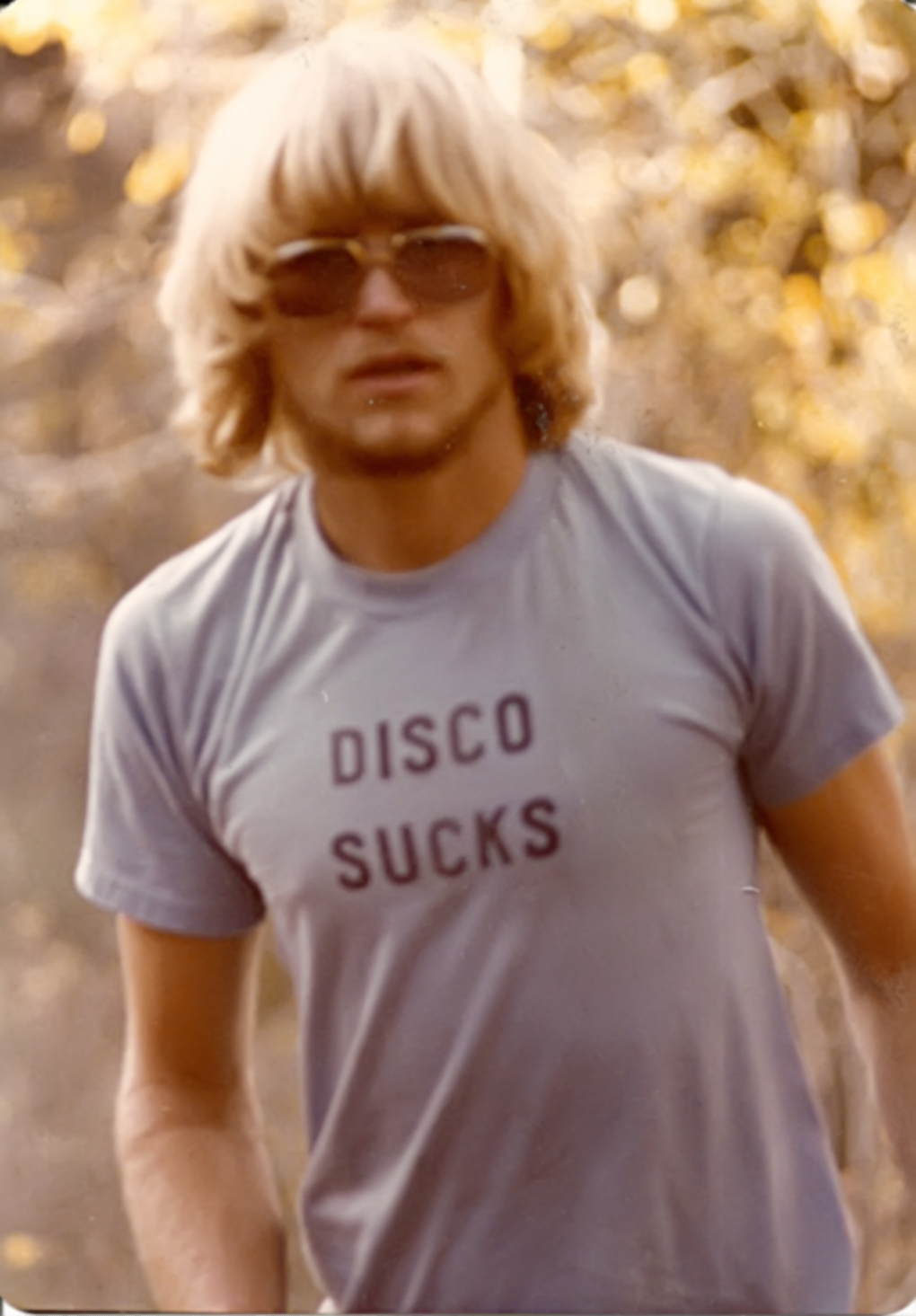
A man wearing a "disco sucks" T-shirt

By the end of the 1970s, anti-disco sentiment developed among rock music fans and musicians, particularly in the United States. Disco was criticized as mindless, consumerist, overproduced and escapist. The slogans "Disco sucks" and "Death to disco" became common. Rock artists such as Rod Stewart and David Bowie who added disco elements to their music were accused of selling out.

The punk subculture in the United States and the United Kingdom was often hostile to disco, although, in the UK, many early Sex Pistols fans such as the Bromley Contingent and Jordan liked disco, often congregating at nightclubs such as Louise's in Soho and the Sombrero in Kensington. The track "Love Hangover" by Diana Ross, the house anthem at the former, was cited as a particular favourite by many early UK punks. The film The Great Rock 'n' Roll Swindle and its soundtrack album contained a disco medley of Sex Pistols songs, entitled Black Arabs and credited to a group of the same name.

However, Jello Biafra of the Dead Kennedys, in the song "Saturday Night Holocaust", likened disco to the cabaret culture of Weimar-era Germany for its apathy towards government policies and its escapism. Mark Mothersbaugh of Devo said that disco was "like a beautiful woman with a great body and no brains", and a product of political apathy of that era. Experimental filmmaker Wheeler Winston Dixon called it "absolutely brain dead", describing around-the-clock disco radio as "just awful" and New York's Studio 54 club as "really dull and elitist" and "everything I was against". (He favored CBGB, which he called "something of a haven", with New Wave acts like Blondie, The Ramones and Television.) David Byrne, lead singer of Talking Heads, commented in the liner notes for the compilation album Once in a Lifetime: The Best of Talking Heads about lyrics in their 1979 song "Life During Wartime" ("This ain't no party, this ain't no disco, this ain't no foolin' around"):

The line "This ain't no disco" sure stuck! Remember when they would build bonfires of Donna Summer records? Well, we liked some disco music! It's called "dance music" now. Some of it was radical, camp, silly, transcendent and disposable. So it was funny that we were sometimes seen as the flag-bearers of the anti-disco movement.

New Jersey rock critic Jim Testa wrote "Put a Bullet Through the Jukebox", a vitriolic screed attacking disco that was considered a punk call to arms. Steve Hillage, shortly prior to his transformation from a progressive rock musician into an electronic artist at the end of the 1970s with the inspiration of disco, disappointed his rockist fans by admitting his love for disco, with Hillage recalling "it's like I'd killed their pet cat."

Anti-disco sentiment was expressed in some television shows and films. A recurring theme on the show WKRP in Cincinnati was a hostile attitude towards disco music. In one scene of the 1980 comedy film Airplane!, a wayward airplane slices a radio tower with its wing, knocking out an all-disco radio station. July 12, 1979, became known as "the day disco died" because of the Disco Demolition Night, an anti-disco demonstration in a baseball double-header at Comiskey Park in Chicago. Rock station DJs Steve Dahl and Garry Meier, along with Michael Veeck, son of Chicago White Sox owner Bill Veeck, staged the promotional event for disgruntled rock fans between the games of a White Sox doubleheader which involved exploding disco records in centerfield. As the second game was about to begin, the raucous crowd stormed onto the field and proceeded to set fires and tear out seats and pieces of turf. The Chicago Police Department made numerous arrests, and the extensive damage to the field forced the White Sox to forfeit the second game to the Detroit Tigers, who had won the first game.

Disco's decline in popularity after Disco Demolition Night was rapid in the United States. On July 12, 1979, the top six records on the U.S. music charts were disco songs. By September 22, there were no disco songs in the US Top 10 chart, with the exception of Herb Alpert's instrumental "Rise", a smooth jazz composition with some disco overtones. Some in the media, in celebratory tones, declared disco dead and rock revived. Karen Mixon Cook, the first female disco DJ, stated that people still pause every July 12 for a moment of silence in honor of disco. Dahl stated in a 2004 interview that disco was "probably on its way out [at the time]. But I think [Disco Demolition Night] hastened its demise".

=== Impact on the music industry ===
The anti-disco movement, combined with other societal and radio industry factors, changed the face of pop radio in the years following Disco Demolition Night. Starting in the 1980s, country music began a slow rise on the pop chart. Emblematic of country music's rise to mainstream popularity was the commercially successful 1980 movie Urban Cowboy. The continued popularity of power pop and the revival of oldies in the late 1970s was also related to disco's decline; the 1978 film Grease was emblematic of this trend. Coincidentally, the star of both films was John Travolta, who in 1977 had starred in Saturday Night Fever, which remains one of the most iconic disco films of the era.

During this period of decline in disco's popularity, several record companies folded, were reorganized, or were sold. In 1979, MCA Records purchased ABC Records, absorbed some of its artists and then shut the label down. Midsong International Records ceased operations in 1980. RSO Records founder Robert Stigwood left the label in 1981 and TK Records closed in the same year. Salsoul Records continues to exist in the 2000s, but primarily is used as a reissue brand. Casablanca Records had been releasing fewer records in the 1980s, and was shut down in 1986 by parent company PolyGram.

Many groups that were popular during the disco period subsequently struggled to maintain their success—even ones who tried to adapt to evolving musical tastes. The Bee Gees, for instance, retreated from the pop mainstream in the early 1980s and spent the first half of the decade writing and producing successful material for other artists, such as Barbra Streisand and Dionne Warwick, finally returning for 1987's E.S.P., which spawned the chart-topping hit "You Win Again" in their home country, whereas in the US, they only had one top-10 entry (1989's "One") and three other top-40 songs, and the band itself largely abandoned disco in its 1980s and 1990s songs. Chic never hit the top 40 again after "Good Times" topped the chart in August 1979. Of the handful of groups not taken down by disco's fall from favor, Kool & the Gang, Donna Summer, the Jacksons, and Gloria Gaynor in particular, stand out. In spite of having helped define the disco sound early on, they continued to make popular and danceable, if more refined, songs for yet another generation of music fans in the 1980s and beyond. Earth, Wind & Fire also survived the anti-disco trend and continued to produce successful singles at roughly the same pace for several more years, in addition to an even longer string of R&B chart hits that lasted into the 1990s. Some popular disco tracks released after Disco Demolition Night include "Celebration" by Kool & the Gang (1980), "Can't Take My Eyes Off You" by the Boys Town Gang (1982), "Stomp!" by the Brothers Johnson (1980), "Upside Down" and "I'm Coming Out" by Diana Ross (both 1980), "My Feet Keep Dancing" by Chic (1979), "Funkytown" by Lipps Inc. (1980), "Lady (You Bring Me Up)" by the Commodores (1981), "All American Girls" by Sister Sledge (1981), "Can't Fake the Feeling" by Geraldine Hunt (1980) and "Shoot Your Best Shot" by Linda Clifford (1980).

Six months prior to Disco Demolition Night (in December 1978), popular progressive rock radio station WDAI (WLS-FM) had suddenly switched to an all-disco format, disenfranchising thousands of Chicago rock fans and leaving Dahl unemployed. WDAI, who survived the change of public sentiment and still had good ratings at this point, continued to play disco until it flipped to a short-lived hybrid Top 40/rock format in May 1980. Another disco outlet that competed against WDAI at the time, WGCI-FM, would later incorporate R&B and pop songs into the format, eventually evolving into an urban contemporary outlet that it continues with today. The latter also helped bring the Chicago house genre to the airwaves.

=== Factors contributing to disco's decline ===
Factors that have been cited as leading to the decline of disco in the United States include economic and political changes at the end of the 1970s, as well as burnout from the hedonistic lifestyles led by participants. In the years since Disco Demolition Night, some social critics have described the "Disco sucks" movement as implicitly macho and bigoted, and an attack on non-white and non-heterosexual cultures. It was also linked to a wider cultural "backlash", the move towards conservatism, that also made its way into US politics with the election of conservative president Ronald Reagan in 1980, which also led to Republican control of the United States Senate for the first time since 1954, plus the subsequent rise of the Religious Right around the same time.

In January 1979, rock critic Robert Christgau argued that homophobia, and most likely racism, were reasons behind the movement, a conclusion seconded by John Rockwell. Craig Werner wrote: "The Anti-disco movement represented an unholy alliance of funkateers and feminists, progressives, and puritans, rockers and reactionaries. Nonetheless, the attacks on disco gave respectable voice to the ugliest kinds of unacknowledged racism, sexism and homophobia." Legs McNeil, founder of the fanzine Punk, was quoted in an interview as saying, "the hippies always wanted to be black. We were going, 'fuck the blues, fuck the black experience.'" He also said that disco was the result of an "unholy" union between homosexuals and blacks.

Steve Dahl, who had spearheaded Disco Demolition Night, denied any racist or homophobic undertones to the promotion, saying, "It's really easy to look at it historically, from this perspective, and attach all those things to it. But we weren't thinking like that," it was "just kids pissing on a musical genre". It has been noted that British punk rock critics of disco were very supportive of the pro-black/anti-racist reggae genre as well as the more pro-gay new romantics movement. Christgau and Jim Testa have said that there were legitimate artistic reasons for being critical of disco.

In 1979, the music industry in the United States underwent its worst slump in decades, and disco, despite its mass popularity, was blamed. The producer-oriented sound was having difficulty mixing well with the industry's artist-oriented marketing system. Harold Childs, senior vice president at A&M Records, reportedly told the Los Angeles Times that "radio is really desperate for rock product" and "they're all looking for some white rock-n-roll".

== 1981–1989: Aftermath ==
=== Birth of electronic dance music ===
Disco was instrumental in the development of electronic dance music genres like house, techno, and Eurodance. The Eurodisco song "I Feel Love", produced by Giorgio Moroder for Donna Summer in 1976, has been described as a milestone and blueprint for electronic dance music because it was the first to combine repetitive synthesizer loops with a continuous four-on-the-floor bass drum and an off-beat hi-hat, which would become a main feature of techno and house ten years later.

During the first years of the 1980s, the traditional disco sound characterized by complex arrangements performed by large ensembles of studio session musicians (including a horn section and an orchestral string section) began to be phased out, and faster tempos and synthesized effects, accompanied by guitar and simplified backgrounds, moved dance music toward electronic and pop genres, starting with hi-NRG. Despite its decline in popularity, so-called club music and European-style disco remained relatively successful in the early-to-mid 1980s with songs like Aneka's "Japanese Boy", The Weather Girls's "It's Raining Men", Patrice Rushen's "Forget Me Nots", Stacey Q's "Two of Hearts", Dead or Alive's "You Spin Me Round (Like a Record)", Laura Branigan's "Self Control", and Baltimora's "Tarzan Boy". However, a revival of the traditional-style disco called nu-disco has been popular since the 1990s.

House music displayed a strong disco influence, which is why house music, regarding its enormous success in shaping electronic dance music and contemporary club culture, is often described being "disco's revenge". Early house music was generally dance-based music characterized by repetitive four-on-the-floor beats, rhythms mainly provided by drum machines, off-beat hi-hat cymbals, and synthesized basslines. While house displayed several characteristics similar to disco music, it was more electronic and minimalist, and the repetitive rhythm of house was more important than the song itself. As well, house did not use the lush string sections that were a key part of the disco sound.

== See also ==
- DJ mix
