= Who Loves You =

Studio album by The Four Seasons
- Released: November 1975
- Recorded: 1975
- Studio: Sound Factory (Hollywood)
- Length: 36:45
- Label: Warner Bros., Curb
- Producer: Bob Gaudio

The Four Seasons chronology
| Chameleon (1972) | Who Loves You (1975) | Helicon (1977) |

Singles from Who Loves You
- 1. "Who Loves You" Released: August 2, 1975; 2. "December, 1963 (Oh, What a Night)" Released: December 5, 1975; 3. "Silver Star" Released: April 1976

Who Loves You is an album by The Four Seasons. It was released in 1975 on Warner/Curb Records.

Professional ratings
Review scores
| Source | Rating |
|---|---|
| Allmusic | 3.5/5 stars |
| Best Ever Albums | 4/5 stars |

== Background ==
The record introduced the new Four Seasons lineup which now included John Paiva (guitar), Don Ciccone (bass), Lee Shapiro (keyboards) and Gerry Polci (drums). Mike Curb, who was drawn to The Four Seasons' clean-cut image, was also involved with the release of the album.

Who Loves You was the first album from The Four Seasons to de-emphasize Frankie Valli as lead singer. During the initial recording sessions, Valli—who already had a solo deal with Private Stock Records—was in Europe and did not have the time to learn the album's title track, "Who Loves You", when he returned, so Ciccone, a former lead singer of The Critters, recorded the lead vocal on the song initially as a demo. (Joe Long, whom Ciccone was replacing as bassist, agreed to record the bass and bass vocal track for the demo; it would be his last song with the group.) When Bob Gaudio pitched the demo to Warner Bros., according to Ciccone, they were so impressed with the song, and intrigued by the idea of a new Four Seasons lead vocalist to help differentiate the Seasons from the Valli solo records he was recording for Private Stock, that they signed the Seasons to a new record deal and declared Ciccone the Four Seasons' new lead singer. When Valli returned and learned of the signing, he was furious that Warner Bros. had let Ciccone upstage him. Valli then recorded the new lead vocal track, removing Ciccone's demo vocals except for his group contributions on the chorus. "Who Loves You" established the band as stars of the 1970s (peaking at #3 on the Billboard Hot 100 singles chart).

Despite Valli's objections (as well as Long's, who thought that the band was moving too far away from its trademark sound and left in part because of that fact), Ciccone and Polci would handle the bulk of lead vocals on the new album. "December, 1963 (Oh, What a Night)", released in December 1975, spent six months on the charts and became the group's all-time best-selling single. "Silver Star", the last single, also hit the Top 40, reaching #38 on the Hot 100 in 1976. All three singles from the album were successes in the UK, each placing in the top six positions of the UK Singles Chart.

== Track listing ==
All songs written by Bob Gaudio and Judy Parker.

Side One
| No. | Title | Length |
|---|---|---|
| 1. | "Silver Star" | 6:05 |
| 2. | "Storybook Lovers" | 3:43 |
| 3. | "Harmony, Perfect Harmony" | 4:46 |
| 4. | "Who Loves You" | 4:22 |

Side Two
| No. | Title | Length |
|---|---|---|
| 5. | "Mystic Mr. Sam" | 4:23 |
| 6. | "December, 1963 (Oh, What a Night)" | 3:36 |
| 7. | "Slip Away" | 3:04 |
| 8. | "Emily's (Salle De Danse)" | 6:40 |

On the LP, the tracks are ordered as above; however, both the inner and outer sleeves list the tracks in a different order.

- Side one
  1. Storybook Lovers
  2. Silver Star
  3. Harmony, Perfect Harmony
  4. Emily's (Salle De Danse)
- Side two
  1. Mystic Mr. Sam
  2. December, 1963 (Oh, What A Night)
  3. Slip Away
  4. Who Loves You

The CD rerelease uses yet another track order.

1. Who Loves You
2. Mystic Mr. Sam
3. Silver Star
4. Emily's (Salle De Danse)
5. Storybook Lovers
6. December, 1963 (Oh, What A Night)
7. Harmony, Perfect Harmony
8. Slip Away

== Charts ==
Album
| Chart (1976) | Position |
|---|---|
| US Billboard 200 | 38 |
| Australia (Kent Music Report) | 55 |
| UK Albums Chart | 12 |

Singles
| Year | Single | Chart | Position |
|---|---|---|---|
| 1975 | "Who Loves You" | The Billboard Hot 100 | 3 |
| 1976 | "December, 1963 (Oh, What a Night)" | The Billboard Hot 100 | 1 |
| 1976 | "Silver Star" | The Billboard Hot 100 | 38 |
