= Silver Star (The Four Seasons song) =

Single by The Four Seasons

from the album Who Loves You
- B-side: "Mystic Mr. Sam"
- Released: April 1976
- Recorded: 1975
- Genre: Rock
- Length: 3:48 (single), 6:03 (album)
- Label: Warner Bros./Curb
- Songwriter: Bob Gaudio-Judy Parker
- Producer: Bob Gaudio

The Four Seasons singles chronology
"December, 1963 (Oh, What a Night)" (1975)	"Silver Star" (1976)	"Down the Hall" (1977)

"Silver Star" is the opening song on the Four Seasons album Who Loves You. As was the case of all the songs on the LP, it was written by Bob Gaudio and Judy Parker and produced by Gaudio. Drummer Gerry Polci sang lead. Frankie Valli's contribution was limited to harmony vocals, since he was gradually losing his hearing in the 1970s due to otosclerosis. An operation restored most of Valli's hearing in the 1980s.

== Reception ==
Billboard said that "Silver Star" is an "infectious rocker with a disco feel," saying further that it sounds "in spots" like early Who songs. Cash Box called the song "an up-tempo cut, with strong emphasis...on vocal harmony," stating that "acoustic guitars hold up the rhythm tracks" and that "the song has a couple of interesting breaks that work well to hook the listener into the song." Record World said that it "should keep the group's streak [of hits] alive without any difficulty."

== Chart performance ==
Released shortly after the #3 (US) hit "Who Loves You" and the #1 "December, 1963 (Oh, What a Night)", both of which Polci was also lead or co-lead, the single was an edited version of a six-minute, nine second, song that married lyrics of love and Western movies with a disco beat that was the signature of "Who Loves You". The single reached #38 on the Billboard Hot 100. The song was far more successful in the United Kingdom, however, reaching #3 on the UK singles chart, although its chart run was short-lived and somewhat erratic there. The group played the song on the 8 April 1976 broadcast episode of Top of the Pops (with Noel Edmonds hosting). Valli also appeared on the same episode as a solo artist performing his 1976 hit "Fallen Angel".

=== Weekly charts ===
Chart (1976)	Peak position
Australia (Kent Music Report)	84
Belgium (Ultratop)	22
Canada RPM Top Singles	45
Canada RPM Adult Contemporary	40
Ireland (IRMA)	4
Netherlands (Single Top 100)	22
UK Singles (OCC)	3
US Billboard Hot 100	38
US Billboard Adult Contemporary	24
US Cash Box Top 100	68
US Radio & Records Pop Adult/40	25
US Record World Singles Chart	95
West Germany (Official German Charts)	29
