= Chameleon (The Four Seasons album) =

Studio album by the Four Seasons
- Released: May 1972
- Recorded: 1972
- Length: 33:33
- Label: MoWest
- Producer: Bob Gaudio

The Four Seasons chronology
Half & Half (1970)	Chameleon (1972)	Who Loves You (1975)

Professional ratings
Review scores
Source	Rating
AllMusic	3.5/5 stars

Chameleon is a 1972 album by the Four Seasons, notable for being their only album with Motown and the only one featuring Demetri Callas on guitar; Callas had replaced band co-founder Tommy DeVito in 1970 but left in 1974, replaced by Don Ciccone and John Paiva during the band's mid-1970s renaissance. The album met with limited success in the US; no single was issued in America. "The Night", however, peaked at No. 7 in 1975 in the UK, becoming a Northern soul mainstay.

== Track listing ==
Chameleon track listing
Track	Song	Writer(s)	Time
1	"A New Beginning (Prelude)"	Bob Crewe, Bob Gaudio	1:21
2	"Sun Country"	Bob Gaudio	4:07
3	"You're a Song (That I Can't Sing)"	Bob Gaudio, Brit Gaudio	3:11
4	"The Night"	Al Ruzicka, Bob Gaudio	3:22
5	"A New Beginning"	Bob Crewe, Bob Gaudio	4:45
6	"When the Morning Comes"	Bob Gaudio	4:37
7	"Poor Fool"	Al Ruzicka	4:20
8	"Touch the Rainchild"	Al Ruzicka, Bob Gaudio	4:22
9	"Love Isn't Here (Like it Used to Be)"	Bob Gaudio, Brit Gaudio	3:44

== Non-album singles ==
The following singles were recorded during the band's tenure at Motown in a 1973 recording session after Chameleon was released. Some of the tracks from these sessions later turned up on Frankie Valli's 1975 "solo" album Inside You, which was a collection of unreleased songs and outtakes from Chameleon. These sessions were distinguished by the return of original bass Nick Massi as an arranger and occasional singer.

- "Walk On, Don't Look Back/Sun Country" – MoWest 5026
- "How Come?/Life and Breath" – Motown 1255
- "Hickory/Charisma" – Motown 1288
- "You've Got Your Troubles/Listen to Yesterday" – Motown 1251
- "The Scalawag Song (And I Will Love You)/Hickory" – Motown 1279

"My Eyes Adored You" was also recorded during the band's tenure at Motown but would instead be released by Private Stock Records under Valli's name, after Valli bought back the rights to the song in 1974.

== Legacy ==
Although reception at the time of release was lukewarm, opinions today from both fans and critics are very positive. Noted for the distinctive Motown sound combined with the sounds of the Four Seasons, the album's "slick pop production values" made for a unique album in their catalog. Chameleon was unavailable on compact disc until 2008, when Universal Music Group, the parent owner of Motown Records, released a 2-disc compilation titled Frankie Valli and the Four Seasons: The Motown Years. It included this album, Frankie Valli's Inside You (1975), and all the non-album singles. With this release, all of the Four Seasons' material recorded for Motown is now accessible.

=== The Motown Years track listing ===
Disc one

1. "A New Beginning (Prelude)" – 1:21
2. "Sun Country" – 4:07
3. "You're a Song (That I Can't Sing)" – 3:13
4. "The Night" – 3:25
5. "A New Beginning" – 4:47
6. "When the Morning Comes" – 4:39
7. "Poor Fool" – 4:10
8. "Touch the Rainchild" – 4:23
9. "Love Isn't Here (Like It Used to Be)" – 3:45
10. "Walk On, Don't Look Back" – 2:58
11. "How Come?" – 3:45
12. "Life and Breath" – 3:08
13. "Hickory" – 2:52
14. "Charisma" (Unedited version) – 4:30
15. "Charisma" (Single version) – 3:20

Disc two

1. "Just Look What You've Done" – 4:49
2. "Love Isn't Here (Like It Used to Be)" (1975 remix) – 3:50
3. "Baby I Need Your Loving" – 3:06
4. "Inside You" – 4:05
5. "Thank You" – 3:33
6. "Hickory" – 3:02
7. "Life and Breath" (1975 remix) – 2:59
8. "The Night" (1975 remix) – 3:21
9. "With My Eyes Wide Open" – 4:31
10. "You've Got Your Troubles" – 4:06
11. "Listen to Yesterday" – 4:03
12. "The Scalawag Song (And I Will Love You)" – 2:42

== Personnel ==
Partial credits.

The Four Seasons

- Frankie Valli – vocals
- Bob Gaudio – vocals, keyboards, piano, producer
- Joe Long – vocals, bass guitar
- Demetri Callas – vocals, guitar
- Lee Shapiro – keyboards (1973 sessions only)
- Nick Massi – vocals (1973 sessions only)

Additional personnel (1972 sessions)

- Paul Wilson – drums
- Al Ruzicka – keyboards
- Clay Jordan – guitar
