= Who Loves You (song) =

1975 single by The Four Seasons

Single by The Four Seasons

from the album Who Loves You
- B-side: "Who Loves You" (Disco version)
- Released: 2 August 1975
- Recorded: July 1975
- Genre: Disco
- Length: 4:04 (single version); 4:22 (album version)
- Label: Warner Bros./Curb
- Songwriters: Bob Gaudio; Judy Parker
- Producer: Bob Gaudio

The Four Seasons singles chronology
"Hickory" (1974)	"Who Loves You" (1975)	"December, 1963 (Oh, What a Night)" (1975)

Vinyl 45

Music video
- Listen to "Who Loves You" (Official Music Video) on YouTube

"Who Loves You" is the title song of a 1975 album by The Four Seasons. It was composed by Bob Gaudio and Judy Parker and produced by Gaudio. It reached number 3 on the Billboard Hot 100 in November 1975. The song features Frankie Valli as lead vocalist along with Don Ciccone, who provides falsetto vocals in the bridge sections.

== Song information ==
After their release from Philips, the group signed with Motown and released one album and three singles for the organization in 1972 and 1973. All Motown recordings failed to chart in the U.S. and the company dropped the band. In August 1975, "Who Loves You" entered the Hot 100 as Frankie Valli's "Swearin' to God" was sliding off the chart. This was the final Four Seasons hit featuring bassist and backing vocalist Joe Long.

As Valli was overseas and unavailable during the initial recording session, Don Ciccone took over lead vocals. When Warner Bros. heard the record, according to Ciccone, they were so impressed that they declared Ciccone the group's new lead singer, which prompted them to release the album despite Valli's existing deal with Private Stock Records. Valli, furious at being undermined by the label, halted the song's release and re-recorded the lead vocals (with Ciccone now on backup with the rest of the band) to retain his position as lead singer. The Four Seasons introduced the song on The Midnight Special on the episode aired July 4, 1975, in what would be one of Long's last public appearances as a member of the group.

Though Bob Gaudio's then-girlfriend Judy Parker is credited as a songwriter on the record, she had not yet begun songwriting by the time the song was recorded. Parker would contribute her first lyric to their next song "December, 1963 (Oh, What a Night)."

== Reception ==
Cash Box called it "a high-energy, commercially potent disk with high vocal work and sweet strings — and a rhythm that can make time in any disco." Record World said that "[the group's] trademark sound moves onward!"

== Personnel ==
- Frankie Valli – co-lead vocals, backing vocals
- Don Ciccone – backing vocals, electric rhythm guitar
- Joe Long – bass backing vocals and bass guitar
- John Paiva – backing vocals, electric lead guitar
- Gerry Polci – backing vocals, drums
- Lee Shapiro – backing vocals, keyboards, piano, synthesizers, string arrangements
- Bob Gaudio – piano, keyboards, producer

== Charts ==
=== Weekly charts ===
Chart (1975–76)	Peak position
Australia (KMR)	16
Canada RPM Top Singles*	≥ 20
Canada RPM Adult Contemporary*	≥ 12
Ireland (IRMA)	20
New Zealand (RIANZ)	22
South Africa (Springbok Radio)	13
UK (OCC)	6
US Billboard Hot 100	3
US Billboard Adult Contemporary	7
US Cash Box Top 100	7

=== Year-end charts ===
Chart (1975)	Rank
Canada RPM Top Singles	70
US (Joel Whitburn's Pop Annual)	44

(* - Canadian RPM chart data incomplete for late 1975)

== Other versions ==
There were three versions of "Who Loves You" released in the United States: the one on the Who Loves You album is four minutes, 20 seconds long and begins with a short percussion section before the start of the vocals. The A-side of the single has a 4-minute 4 second version which starts with an unusual "fade-in" beginning, starting with the first word of the lyrics; the B-side (labeled "Who Loves You (disco version)") extends the running time to 5:28 by featuring the instrumental break twice.

Although the Four Seasons' trademark falsetto is present on "Who Loves You", Valli's vocal performance on the recording is limited to singing lead on the verses.

"Who Loves You" was a tremendous success, giving the Four Seasons a major hit at a time when they were largely seen as has-beens. Released in August 1975, the single spent 20 weeks on the Hot 100 (longer than any Four Seasons single before) and managed to stay on the chart until the beginning of 1976.

This song was edited heavily and included as the closing number for the musical Jersey Boys. The second verse and instrumental break is completely omitted, and instead of the fade out, a loud, high-pitched ending chord is sung by the full company. However, the Original Broadway Cast Recording includes the instrumental break.

== Pop-culture references ==
The song was often used as bumper music by late night radio talk show host Art Bell when he hosted Coast to Coast AM in the 1990s.

Christopher Knowles references the song-title and Valli/Four Seasons in a section of the libretto of Einstein on the Beach.
