= Spend the Night in Love =

Single by The Four Seasons

from the album Reunited
- B-side: "Slip Away"
- Released: December 1980
- Recorded: 1980
- Genre: Rock
- Label: Warner/Curb
- Songwriters: Bob Gaudio, Judy Parker, Lenny Lee Goldsmith
- Producers: Bob Gaudio, Charlie Calello

The Four Seasons singles chronology
"Down the Hall" (1977)	"Spend the Night in Love" (1980)	"December, 1963 (Oh, What a Night)" (1994)

"Spend the Night in Love" is a 1980 song by the Four Seasons. It was written by Lenny Goldsmith, Bob Gaudio and Judy Parker and produced by Gaudio and longtime Seasons collaborator Charles Calello. The song was the lone single from their album Reunited. The single version is a studio cut; the version on the album, like the remainder of the album, was recorded live on tour.

The song reached number 91 on the US Billboard Hot 100.

In South Africa, the song became a major hit, where it peaked at number four. It was the group's only charting single during the 1980s.

== Charts ==
Chart (1980–81)	Peak position
South Africa (Springbok)	4
US Billboard Hot 100	91
