= Jean Valli =

American country singer (born 1926)

Jean Valli (born May 13, 1926) is an American hillbilly music singer. Born Jean Vadala in on 13 May 1926, she was raised in Carbondale, Pennsylvania and started playing country-western music and yodeling at age 9 with her own radio show at age 13. By age 17, she was not only an entertainer but also a promoter recruiting top country music stars to shows she promoted. After high school she moved to Syracuse, New York where she got a job performing on country station WOLF. She later toured New York State including with country singer Hank Williams Sr.

In the early 1950s she performed with Milton Berle when he hired her for his Kentucky Mountaineering Act, touring with him in the summer and playing clubs in Las Vegas, as well as being featured on Berle's TV show for five years. She played bass fiddle and guitar and wrote country songs, and was considered one of the top female yodelers. Also, she was known to be able to impersonate other artists such as Lefty Frizzell, Kitty Wells, and Wanda Jackson. In 1970, she toured with Grand Ole Opry type country music shows and fairs. She was an active performer around the same time as June Valli, which caused some mix-ups.

Valli took on a teenage singer named Francesco "Frankie" Castelluccio as a protege in 1953. At a meeting with record producers, Valli introduced Castelluccio as her brother, thus giving Castelluccio his stage name, Frankie Valli.

== Discography ==
- 1968 Since You've Been Gone (Country Bell 71272) (ABC 11448)
- 1974 The World's About To Lose (It's [sic] Biggest Fool) (Stop ST-154)
