= Joe Long =

American bassist (1932–2021)

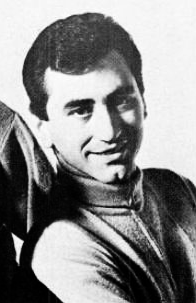
- Long in 1966

Background information
- Born: Joseph Louis LaBracio; September 5, 1932; Elizabeth, New Jersey, U.S.
- Died: April 21, 2021 (aged 88) Long Beach Township, New Jersey, U.S.
- Occupation: Musician
- Instruments: Bass guitar, vocals
- Formerly of: The Four Seasons

Joseph Louis LaBracio (September 5, 1932 – April 21, 2021), better known by his stage name Joe Long, was an American musician. He was best known for his tenure as the bass guitarist and vocalist for the Four Seasons from 1965 to 1975, having succeeded original bassist Nick Massi in those positions.

== Early life ==
Joseph Louis LaBracio was born in Elizabeth, New Jersey to Joe Labracio and Mary Picaro. His grandparents had emigrated to the US from Italy. When he was six, his father gifted him an accordion, which started his love for music. When he was seventeen, his father fell ill, and so he had to leave college to get a job to support his family.

Long got a job at Singer Sewing Machines, and was involved in an accident that severely damaged his left hand: a machine malfunctioned, trapping his hand. He spent two weeks in hospital, and had reconstructive surgery

== The Four Seasons ==
Long was a classically trained musician who studied with Alfonse Strazza, the principal upright-bassist for the New York Philharmonic. However, his hand injury sustained from work meant that his hand was no longer strong enough to play the upright so Joe had to give up the rigors of playing classical bass and switch to the Fender bass guitar. He then began listening more to rock and roll music and became a bass player for several local New Jersey rock bands before joining the Four Seasons in 1965.

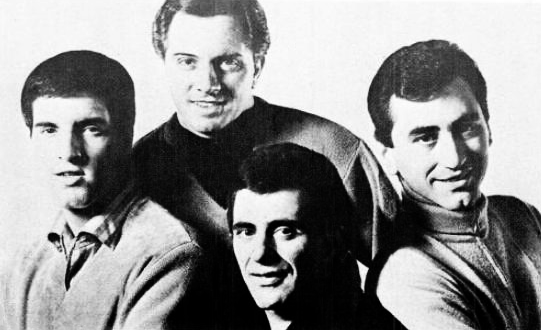
Long (at right) with the Four Seasons in 1966

Long recalled that Tommy DeVito had called Long's agent regarding an opening in the band following Nick Massi's abrupt resignation that year, and that in lieu of an audition, Long was sent on tour to West Virginia and thrown into the band's lineup without warning when Charles Calello, who had been filling in for Massi, had a schedule conflict and was unavailable. Long and Massi were familiar with each other during their times in the local New Jersey music scene, and Massi reputedly had recommended Long as his successor. Long and DeVito proved to have excellent on-stage chemistry, and thus Long became a permanent member of the band. Long helped guide the group away from its original target audience of working-class youth and into more adult material, noting that his favorite album with the group was The Genuine Imitation Life Gazette and his favorite song was their cover of "I've Got You Under My Skin." A competent guitarist in addition to his bass playing, Long trained Penny "Demetri" Callas to replace DeVito after DeVito left the band in 1970.

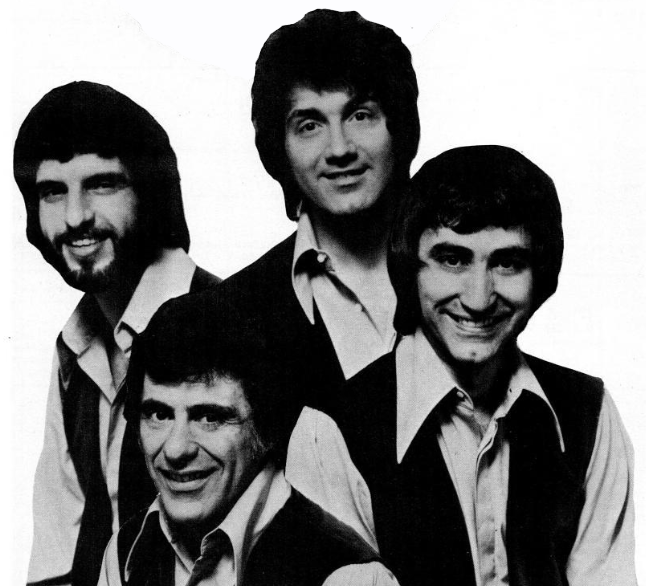
Long (at right) with the Four Seasons in 1973

He continued to record, perform and tour with The Four Seasons through the mid-1970s, with his last work being their comeback hit "Who Loves You." Long's departure from the group came with some contention; Long recalled that though lead singer Frankie Valli remained loyal to him (unsuccessfully lobbying for Long to be included in the group's Rock and Roll Hall of Fame induction and hiring him to emcee occasional Four Seasons shows), the new members of the band (Lee Shapiro, Gerry Polci and Don Ciccone) and an unnamed member of the backing band (possibly John Paiva, who was immediately promoted to the main lineup after Long's departure), convinced producer and band co-owner Bob Gaudio to force Long out, claiming that the group was being held back due to Long's ties to the previous lineups and oddball style. Long also stated that he had asked for a larger cut of The Four Seasons' profits given his role in the band but that, contrary to a claim by the Seasons' attorney, he had not given Valli or Gaudio an ultimatum. Long had also shown dissatisfaction with the new material (much of it co-written by Gaudio's new girlfriend Judy Parker) because it was straying too far from the group's core sound, commenting that when "Uptown Girl" became a hit for Billy Joel, Long felt vindicated in his stance.

== Later career ==
After leaving the group, Long formed the rock 'n roll group LaBracio and later the jazz band Jersey Bounce. In a 2007 interview, Long stated "I still play an occasional gig. And, I have done a few recording sessions with Tommy. For the most part, though, I am retired." He was portrayed, mainly as a background character, in Jersey Boys; Long admitted he liked the play, but that it was only accurate with regard to character personalities and not with chronology, and that he was not fond of the film adaptation. For the last several years of his life, he came out of retirement to serve as music director and occasional on-stage member of the Jersey Four, a Four Seasons tribute band. Upon his death, Polci replaced Long in the Jersey Four.

Long was inducted, along with DeVito, Gaudio and Massi, into the New Jersey Hall of Fame as members of the Four Seasons in 2017 (Valli had already been inducted in 2010). The inclusion of Long in the New Jersey Hall of Fame lineup was partial redemption, as he held ill feelings toward the Rock and Roll Hall of Fame for excluding him in its induction of the Four Seasons.

== Personal life ==
Long was married twice: he married his first wife, Laura, in 1967 but after it dissolved he married Pam in 1978. He had two children, Joey and Kimberley.

== Death ==
Long died from complications of COVID-19 on April 21, 2021, during the COVID-19 pandemic in New Jersey. He was the second member of the Four Seasons to die from the virus, the first being original member Tommy DeVito, who died aged 92 seven months prior.
