= Disco Party (album) =

Studio album by Percy Faith and his Orchesetra
- Released: 1975
- Studio: A&M Studios, Hollywood, California
- Genre: Disco
- Length: 32:14
- Label: Columbia
- Producer: Ted Glasser

Disco Party is an album released by Percy Faith and his Orchestra in 1975 on Columbia LP record AS 33549.

== Track listing ==
1. "Cherry, Cherry" (Instrumental) (Neil Diamond) – 4:20
2. "El Bimbo" (Claude Morgan) – 2:40
3. "The King is Dead" (Instrumental) (Tony Cole) – 2:30
4. "Love Music" (Dennis Lambert, Brian Potter) – 3:51
5. "7-6-5-4-3-2-1 (Blow Your Whistle)" (Roger Cook) – 3:46
6. "Chompin’" [Instrumental] (Percy Faith) – 3:21
7. "Mongonucleosis" (Instrumental) (James Pankow) – 2:29
8. "Coldwater Morning" (Neil Diamond) – 2:54
9. "Substitute" (Willie Harry Wilson) – 2:45
10. "Hava Nagilah" (Percy Faith) – 3:38
