= The Night (Frankie Valli and the Four Seasons song) =

Single by Frankie Valli and The Four Seasons

from the album Chameleon
- B-side: "When the Morning Comes"
- Released: 1972
- Recorded: 1972
- Genre: Northern soul
- Length: 3:21
- Label: MoWest
- Songwriter(s): Al Ruzicka, Bob Gaudio
- Producer(s): Bob Gaudio

"The Night" is a song by Frankie Valli and The Four Seasons that was originally released in 1972. Although it failed to chart when first released, it became a popular track on the northern soul circuit, which led to a successful UK re-release in the spring of 1975, when it reached no. 7 on the Official Chart.

The song sees Frankie Valli pleading with a girl that he admires to resist the advances of another guy. The album version features the group singing the opening two lines "Beware of his promise, believe what I say" before Valli joins in. The original US single version has Valli singing those first two lines, the 1975 UK release features the album version.

Valli cited this song as an example of a song that should have been a big hit on first release, but didn't chart due to poor promotion by the MoWest label.

The song was covered by Lene Lovich in 1979, by Intastella in 1995, by Soft Cell in 2002 ("The Night" was due to be their second single in 1981 but instead they opted for "Tainted Love") and Klaxons in 2007. Pulp recorded a version live in Paris for a France Inter radio station Black Session on 17 November 1992.

The song is considered a "Northern Soul" classic due to its heavy bass production and strong beat, as well as the fact that it did not succeed commercially. Far Out critic Tom Taylor rated it as the #90 most underrated song of the 1970s, saying it has "one of the greatest bass sounds you will ever hear" and that "the social club sentiments are ushered in for a song that uniquely couples the club scene with some sort of proto-hip hop production."

== Certifications ==
Certifications for "The Night"
Region	Certification	Certified units/sales
United Kingdom (BPI)	Silver	200,000^{‡}
^{‡} Sales+streaming figures based on certification alone.
