= Gerry Polci =

American singer and musician and member of The Four Seasons

Gerald Michael Polci (born June 9, 1952) is an American singer and musician who was a member of the American rock and pop band The Four Seasons. He is best known for providing lead vocals on their 1975 hit December, 1963 (Oh, What a Night).

== Biography ==
Polci began publicly drumming on New Year's Eve 1966, at age 14, as part of a trio that often played music by much larger bands by vocalizing horn sections. He cited a wide selection of jazz, jazz fusion and hard rock albums as influences on his style. He was recruited to the Four Seasons in 1973 after a saxophonist from the Seasons' backing band, who had played with Polci in various side projects, recruited him to fill the position.

Polci played and sang in the band variously between 1973 and 1990. He sang lead and played drums on a number of their major hits, including the 1976 and 1994 worldwide hit, "December, 1963 (Oh, What a Night)", a UK top three hit, "Silver Star" and the South African top-5 hit "Spend the Night in Love." During his hiatus from the group in the mid-1980s, he formed a power trio, The Funky Three, which was inspired by the work of The Police.

Polci was married briefly to Antonia Valli, the only surviving daughter of Frankie Valli. Their daughter, Olivia Valli, is now a musical theatre performer, including taking the role of her own grandmother in the musical Jersey Boys that dramatizes the early days of the band. He was also married to Rhea Gay Chiles, daughter of late U.S. Senator and Florida Governor Lawton Chiles and Rhea Grafton Chiles.

Interspersed with performing with the Four Seasons, Polci arranged for Barry Manilow for his television specials and did other musical work. After leaving the Four Seasons, he returned to college at Montclair State University in New Jersey and, at the age of 43, began a teaching career at New Providence Middle School. He also performed with the band he co-founded in 2007, 'The Hit Men' — fellow members included his former bandmates in The Four Seasons, Lee Shapiro and Don Ciccone. After a hiatus from performing following Ciccone's 2016 death, he resumed performing in 2023. In 2025, Polci replaced his former bandmate Joe Long (who died in 2021) as a guest performer with the Jersey Four, a Four Seasons tribute act.
