= Judy Parker =

American record producer and songwriter

Judy Parker Gaudio (September 1938—September 14, 2017) was a record producer and songwriter who is best known for her collaborations with and marriage to fellow producer and songwriter Bob Gaudio.

Born to a family in Michigan, Parker began her career as an actress and model, spending four years in Rome, Italy. She began dating Gaudio in 1973 while his band, The Four Seasons, was signed to Motown Records, where she was employed. Gaudio at the time had recently divorced his first wife, Brit Gaudio. Parker and Gaudio began their songwriting collaboration with the LP Who Loves You. One of the songs on the album, "December, 1963 (Oh, What a Night)," was based on an early encounter between the two. (According to the Four Seasons biopic Jersey Boys, where this encounter is fictionalized as a Christmas party in Chicago, Nick Massi introduced Gaudio to Parker, though she is not mentioned again until Gaudio mentions having a wife in his closing monologue. Massi's involvement in their meeting is plausible, as he had briefly reunited with the band for a 1973 recording session.) Her style of writing was a marked departure from the Four Seasons' established sound, prompting Seasons bassist Joe Long to resign. Gaudio and Parker continued writing songs together for subsequent Four Seasons and Frankie Valli albums into the early 1980s; they would marry in 1981.

Parker died September 14, 2017 of a respiratory infection.
