= Don Ciccone =

American singer-songwriter

- Born: Donald Joseph Ciccone; February 28, 1946; Jersey City, New Jersey, U.S.
- Died: October 8, 2016 (aged 70) Ketchum, Idaho, U.S.
- Genres: Rock; pop
- Occupation: Musician
- Instruments: Guitar; bass; vocals
- Formerly of: The Critters, The Four Seasons, Tommy James and the Shondells

Donald Joseph Ciccone (February 28, 1946 – October 8, 2016) was an American singer, songwriter and musician. He was a founding member of the pop group the Critters, singing their biggest hits "Younger Girl" and "Mr. Dieingly Sad". Ciccone was a member of The Four Seasons throughout the late 1970s.

== Early life ==
Ciccone was born in Jersey City, New Jersey, on February 28, 1946. He was the son of an immigrant father, Vito Ciccone, who owned and operated Bill Williams Auto Sales in the 1950s. From the age of 5, Ciccone grew up in a 56-room mansion in Plainfield, New Jersey.

== The Critters ==
During his time with the Critters, he wrote "Mr. Dieingly Sad", produced by Artie Ripp, which reached #17 for the group. He also wrote and recorded "There's Got to be a Word", which was later recorded and released by the Innocence in December 1966. Their version reached #34 on the charts. Facing the threat of being drafted into the Armed Forces, Ciccone left The Critters to enlist in the United States Air Force.

Their song "Mr. Dieingly Sad" he wrote about his girlfriend Kathleen "Kathy" Cobb before he entered the Air Force during the time of the Vietnam War (Cobb later became his wife). The subsequent album by the Innocence included two more songs written by Ciccone, "All I Ask," and "Your Show Is Over." When the Critters' first album started to take off, Ciccone was in the Air Force and the band had to tour without him, which is why many television appearances did not feature him, but instead have Ken Gorka lip-syncing Ciccone's part.

== The Four Seasons ==
After Ciccone's time in the service, Frankie Valli recruited him to join a revamped lineup of The Four Seasons, where he played guitar and bass and contributed lead vocals to songs including "December, 1963 (Oh, What a Night)" and "Rhapsody". Ciccone sang the demo tape for the Seasons' comeback hit "Who Loves You" instead of Valli, who was overseas while Bob Gaudio was showcasing the track to Warner Bros. Records.

Ciccone's son was born in September 1981, and with his music schedule taking up time to be a father and tiring of the offstage complications of touring, he left in early 1982 following the group's last hit, "Spend the Night in Love."

== Later life ==
He joined Tommy James and the Shondells as their bassist through 1987. Ciccone also spent time running a commercial jingle business.

In the early 2010s, Ciccone, at the time performing with a partially re-formed Critters lineup, suggested to his former Four Seasons bandmate Lee Shapiro that they assemble a supergroup consisting of musicians assembled from other bands. Ciccone recruited his Critters bandmate Jimmy Ryan to join Shapiro and Gerry Polci (partially capitalizing on the Jersey Boys resurgence in the Four Seasons' popularity) to form The Hit Men, a group that continues several years after Ciccone died with Shapiro as its manager.

== Personal life ==
After leaving the air force in 1971, he set up a lead sheet company which lasted for three years, 1971 to 1974.

Ciccone, who was a long time resident of Ridgewood, New Jersey and Port Saint Lucie, Florida had moved to Sun Valley, Idaho, a few years before he died of a heart attack on October 8, 2016, in adjacent Ketchum at the age of 70. He was survived by his third wife, Stephanie, two children and two grandchildren.
