= December, 1963 (Oh, What a Night) =

1975 single by the Four Seasons

Single by the Four Seasons

from the album Who Loves You
- B-side: "Slip Away"
- Released: December 5, 1975
- Recorded: November 1975
- Studio: Sound Factory (Hollywood)
- Genre: Disco; doo-wop; pop; soft rock
- Length: 3:36 (album version); 3:20 (single version)
- Label: Warner Bros.; Curb
- Songwriters: Bob Gaudio; Judy Parker
- Producer: Bob Gaudio

The Four Seasons singles chronology
"Who Loves You" (1975)	"December, 1963 (Oh, What a Night)" (1975)	"Silver Star" (1976)

Official music video
- "December, 1963 (Oh What A Night!)" on YouTube

Alternative cover
- Side A of the US vinyl single

"December, 1963 (Oh, What a Night)" is a song originally performed by American band the Four Seasons, written by original Four Seasons keyboardist Bob Gaudio and his future wife Judy Parker, produced by Gaudio, and included on the group's album Who Loves You (1975). The song features drummer Gerry Polci on lead vocals, with Frankie Valli, the group's usual lead vocalist, singing the bridge sections and backing vocals and bassist Don Ciccone singing the falsetto part. The song reached number one in Canada, South Africa, the UK and the US. In 1996, British act Clock had a European hit with their cover version.

== Song origins ==
According to the co-writer and longtime group member Bob Gaudio, the song's lyrics were originally set in 1933 with the title "December 5th, 1933", celebrating the repeal of Prohibition in the United States. While the band felt that the instrumental groove would be a hit, they disliked the lyrics, and so Judy Parker (who had not written a song lyric before), wrote a new set of lyrics. By Gaudio's account, the song was a recollection of his and Parker's first meeting. In real life, Parker and Gaudio had not met until 1973, when both were working as producers for Motown Records. Parker wrote the lyrics from the perspective of a man recalling his first intimacy with a woman. Parker sought to do this in a way that was family friendly because of the Four Seasons' (and Parker's own) clean reputation.

The idea of having Polci and Ciccone sing lead vocals instead of only Valli came from Warner Bros., who had been impressed when they had received a demo of the band's previous single "Who Loves You", with Ciccone on lead vocals. The label reasoned that new lead vocalists would help differentiate the Four Seasons from the solo records. Valli was then also cutting for Private Stock Records, briefly designating Ciccone as the band's new lead vocalist. Although Valli was angered by the suggestion, the album ultimately relied upon Polci and Ciccone as lead vocalists for the rest of the songs on the album.

== Reception ==
The single was released in December 1975 and hit number one on the UK Singles Chart on February 21, 1976. It repeated the feat on the US Billboard Hot 100 on March 13, 1976, remaining in the top spot for three weeks and one week on Cash Box. Billboard ranked it as the No. 4 song for 1976. On April 10 the same year, it topped the RPM National Top Singles Chart in Canada. It was the final Four Seasons' song to reach number one, although Valli would have one final chart-topper as a solo act in 1978 with the theme song to the film Grease.

Billboard magazine said that it has "the flavor and fun of '60s rock with a disco feel," and praised the production and the lead and harmony vocals as well." Cash Box said it has "one of the sweetest melody lines you'll have heard throughout 1975" and that the song is "easy enough to sing along to, combined with an unforgettable bass line." Record World called it a "disco flavored item in [the Four Seasons'] timeless harmony mold."

== Ben Liebrand remix ==
In 1988, Dutch DJ and producer Ben Liebrand remixed the song and re-released it as a single. In 1993, Curb Records, who released the original version of the song, picked up the 1988 remix and released it to the U.S. market. The 1993 re-release spent 27 weeks on the Hot 100 (matching the chart life of the original 1975 single). The peak position of the remix version was #14. Adding together the two 27-week chart runs for the 1975 original single and the remixed version (for a combined total of 54 weeks, two more weeks than a full year) gave the song the longest tenure ever on the Billboard Hot 100 music chart up to that time. This remixed version has a duration of five minutes. It also became the Four Seasons' sole charting song on the Mainstream Top 40 chart, hitting a peak of #6.

== Music video ==
A music video was produced to accompany the original 1975 release. It featured the band performing on a stage along with scenes of a 1950s/early 1960s diner where they were all together with young women dressed in period outfits and drinking ice cream sodas.

== Personnel ==
- Gerry Polci – drums, lead vocals (verses)
- Frankie Valli – backing vocals, lead vocals (first bridge)
- Don Ciccone – backing vocals, bass, lead vocals (second bridge)
- John Paiva – electric guitar
- Lee Shapiro – keyboards, synthesizers, horn and string arrangements
- Bob Gaudio – keyboards, producer

== Charts ==
=== Weekly charts ===
Chart (1975–1976)	Peak position
Australia (Kent Music Report)	2
Belgium (Ultratop 50 Flanders)	3
Belgium (Ultratop 50 Wallonia)	25
Canada Top Singles (RPM)	1
Canada Adult Contemporary (RPM)	3
Italy (Musica e dischi)	19
Ireland (IRMA)	18
Netherlands (Dutch Top 40)	3
Netherlands (Single Top 100)	3
New Zealand (Recorded Music NZ)	2
Norway (VG-lista)	6
South Africa (Springbok Radio)	1
Sweden (Sverigetopplistan)	11
UK Singles (Official Charts)	1
US Billboard Hot 100	1
US Adult Contemporary (Billboard)	18
US Cash Box Top 100	1
West Germany (GfK)	16

Chart (1993–1995)	Peak position
Australia (ARIA)	3
Canada Top Singles (RPM)	23
Canada Adult Contemporary (RPM)	27
New Zealand (Recorded Music NZ)	2
US Billboard Hot 100	14
US Pop Airplay (Billboard)	6
US Cash Box Top 100	11

=== Year-end charts ===
Chart (1976)	Rank
Australia (Kent Music Report)	22
Belgium (Ultratop Flanders)	34
Canada Top Singles (RPM)	13
Netherlands (Dutch Top 40)	25
Netherlands (Single Top 100)	38
New Zealand (Recorded Music NZ)	8
South Africa (Springbok Radio)	4
UK Singles (Music Week)	10
US Billboard Hot 100	4

Chart (1993)	Rank
Australia (ARIA)	14

Chart (1994)	Rank
US Billboard Hot 100	89

Chart (1995)	Rank
New Zealand (Recorded Music NZ)	46

== Certifications ==
Region	Certification	Certified units/sales
Australia (ARIA)	Platinum	70,000^{^}
New Zealand (RMNZ)	5× Platinum	150,000^{‡}
United Kingdom (BPI)	Platinum	600,000^{‡}
United States (RIAA)	Gold	1,000,000^{^}
^{^} Shipments figures based on certification alone.^{‡} Sales+streaming figures based on certification alone.

== Clock version ==
"Oh What a Night"

Single by Clock

from the album About Time 2
- B-side: "You Give Me Love"
- Released: August 26, 1996
- Length: 3:28
- Label: MCA
- Songwriters: Bob Gaudio; Judy Parker
- Producers: Pete Pritchard; Stu Allan

Clock singles chronology
"Whoomph! (There It Is)" (1995)	"Oh What a Night" (1996)	"U Sexy Thing" (1997)

Music video
- "Oh What a Night" on YouTube

British pop-dance act Clock released a dance cover of "Oh What a Night" in August 1996, by MCA Records. The song features backing vocals by Ann-Marie Smith, Beverley Skeete and Miriam Stockley, and was produced by Stu Allan and Pete Pritchard. It peaked at number 13 in both Ireland and in the UK; in the latter country, it stayed at its peak for four nonconsecutive weeks. On the Eurochart Hot 100, the single reached number 49 in September 1996. Outside Europe, it charted in Australia and Israel. Clock performed it several times on British record chart television programme Top of the Pops.

=== Track listings ===
- 12-inch vinyl, UK (1996)

A1. "You Give Me Love" (Ten To Two mix) – 5:18
A2. "You Give Me Love" (Time Ladies Please mix) – 4:42
B1. "Oh What a Night" (club mix) – 5:12
B2. "Oh What a Night" (short stab) – 3:23

- CD single, UK (1996)
1. "Oh What a Night" (radio mix) – 3:23
2. "Oh What a Night" (club mix) – 5:12
3. "You Give Me Love" (Time Ladies Please mix) – 4:42
4. "You Give Me Love" (Ten to Two mix) – 5:18
- CD single, France (1996)
1. "Oh What a Night" (radio mix) – 3:24
2. "Oh What a Night" (soul mix) – 3:26

=== Charts ===
==== Weekly charts ====
Chart (1996)	Peak position
Australia (ARIA)	153
Europe (Eurochart Hot 100)	49
Europe (European Dance Radio)	21
Ireland (IRMA)	13
Israel (Israeli Singles Chart)	21
Scottish Singles Sales (Official Charts)	12
UK Singles (Official Charts)	13
UK Dance (Official Charts)	20
UK Airplay (Music Week)	50
UK Pop Tip Club Chart (Music Week)	1

==== Year-end charts ====
Chart (1996)	Position
UK Singles (OCC)	76
UK Pop Tip Club Chart (Music Week)	9

== Other covers and adaptations ==
The French singer Claude François also recorded a version of this song called "Cette année-là". The song is featured in the French jukebox musical Belles belles belles based on the works of Claude François, as well as in Jersey Boys, in which the song is inserted into the story's timeline in 1963. The music was adapted by French rapper Yannick as Ces soirées-là.
