= Lee Shapiro (musician) =

American musician and member of The Four Seasons

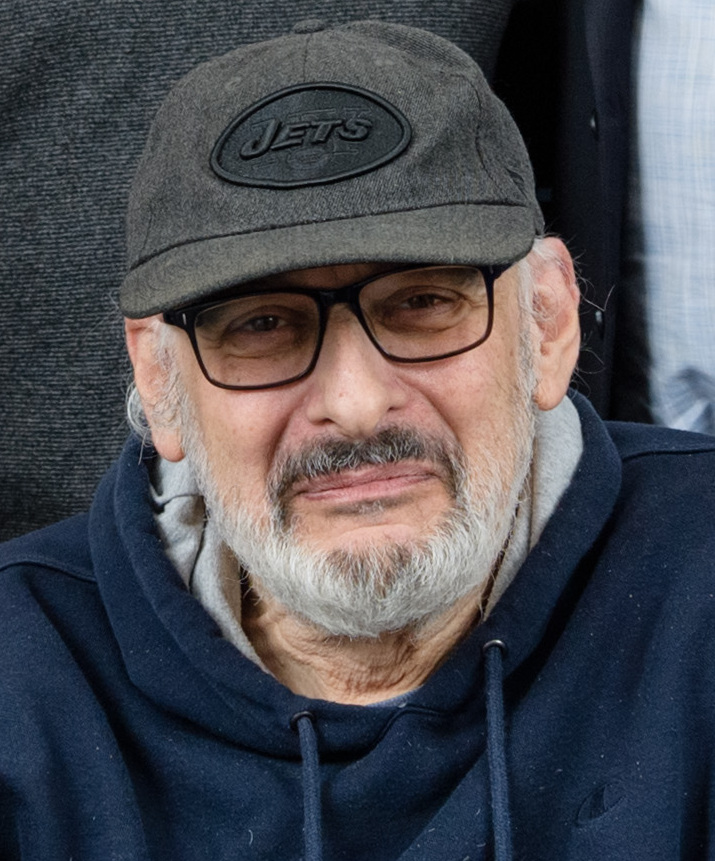
- Shapiro in 2022

Background information
- Born: 1953 (age 72–73); Passaic, New Jersey, US
- Occupations: Musician, arranger
- Instrument: Keyboards
- Years active: 1972–present
- Formerly of: The Four Seasons

Lee Shapiro is an American musician/arranger who was a member of the band The Four Seasons and the founder of The Hit Men, a brand of supergroups featuring session and touring musicians from other bands.

== Early life ==
Shapiro was born in Passaic, New Jersey in 1953 and was raised in Glen Rock, New Jersey.

== The Four Seasons ==
In interviews, Shapiro has stated an early favorite band of his was The Beatles, but that he soon became a bigger fan of The Four Seasons when he noticed it had a dedicated keyboard player, Bob Gaudio, which the Beatles did not at the time.

In 1972, Gaudio was seeking to withdraw from touring and seeking a new arranger (they had largely relied on New York City studio arrangers after their own in-house arranger Nick Massi left in 1965 and wanted to be able to compose more while on the road). Shapiro was 19 and studying at the Manhattan School of Music when he was offered an audition to replace Gaudio, the man he had idolized as a child. Shapiro's first task was to compose a fanfare and overture; he bluffed his way through the arrangement, which lead singer Frankie Valli liked, earning him Valli's respect for the rest of his time in the band. As a member of the band for seven years, he played on records such as their 1975 worldwide hit, "December, 1963 (Oh, What a Night)".

== Later career ==
In the 1980s, after leaving the Four Seasons, Shapiro collaborated on song writing with L. Russell Brown, Sandy Linzer and Irwin Levine. In 1991, Shapiro worked with Barry Manilow on Copacabana, The Musical.

In the 1990s, Shapiro started Lee Shapiro Music, a company that worked on music for media outlets and advertising. The year 1999 saw Shapiro create the toys Rock N Roll Elmo and Rock N Roll Ernie for Fisher-Price.

Shapiro did not give up performing, and in 2010 he formed the band The Hit Men. Initially conceived as a partial reunion of the 1970s-era Four Seasons lineup including Don Ciccone and Gerry Polci, Shapiro revamped the concept after Ciccone's death in 2016.

In 2023, he launched a second band under The Hit Men brand, The Hit Men of Country, which features country musicians.

== Personal life ==
Shapiro was married in 1977 to Georgia and they have one daughter, Ariel.

In 2014, Shapiro was diagnosed with multiple sclerosis but continued to tour with The Hit Men for several years after. As of 2024, Shapiro is no longer a performing member of the group but remains its manager.

== Awards and accolades ==
In 2019, the band The Hit Men was awarded its first Road Warrior award by the Musicians Hall of Fame and Museum in Nashville.

In 2020, Shapiro was nominated in the Legend Musician category of the East Coast Music Hall of Fame.

Lee Shapiro is one of the musicians featured in the documentary Banded Together: The Boys From Glen Rock High, released in 2022. The documentary chronicles Shapiro and his classmates, many of whom went on to musical fame, including the Vivino brothers, Jerry, Jimmy and "Uncle" Floyd.
