= Frankie Valli =

American singer (born 1934)

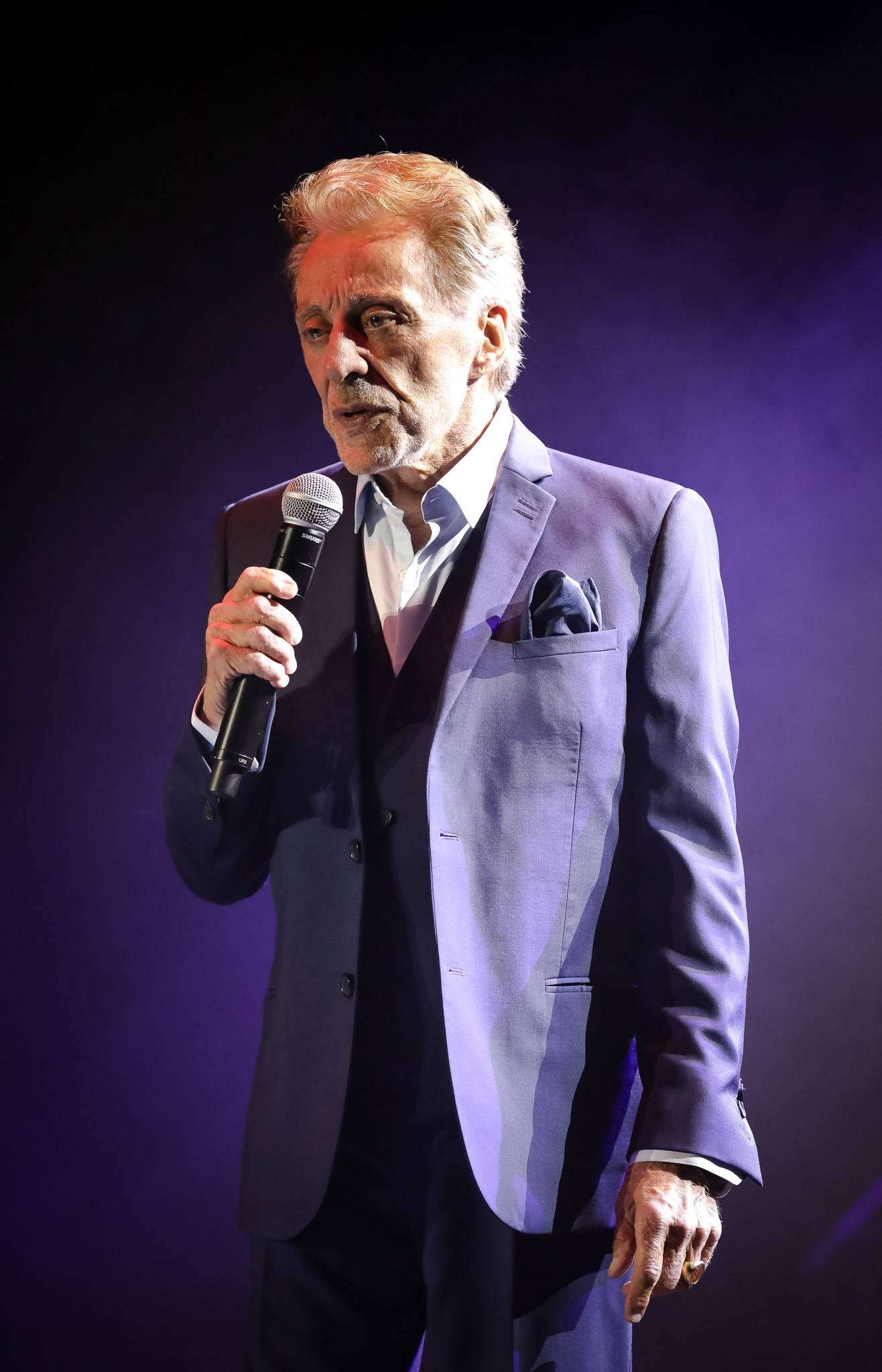
- Valli performing in 2022

Background information
- Born: Francesco Stephen Castelluccio; May 3, 1934 (age 92); Newark, New Jersey, U.S.
- Genres: Rock and roll; pop; blue-eyed soul
- Occupation: Singer
- Years active: 1951–present
- Member of: The Four Seasons
- Formerly of: The Four Lovers; The Wonder Who?
- Spouses: Mary Mandel (m. 1957; div. 1971) MaryAnn Hannigan (m. 1974; div. 1982) Randy Clohessy (m. 1984; div. 2004) Jackie Jacobs (m. 2023)
- Website: Official website

Francesco Stephen Castelluccio (born May 3, 1934), better known by his stage name Frankie Valli, is an American singer and occasional actor, best known as the lead vocalist of the Four Seasons. He is known for his unusually powerful countertenor voice.

Valli scored 29 top-40 hits with the Four Seasons, one top-40 hit under the Four Seasons alias the Wonder Who? and nine top-40 hits as a solo artist. As a member of the Four Seasons, Valli's number-one hits include "Sherry" (1962), "Big Girls Don't Cry" (1962), "Walk Like a Man" (1963), "Rag Doll" (1964), and "December, 1963 (Oh, What a Night)" (1975). His recording of the song "Can't Take My Eyes Off You" reached number two in 1967. As a solo artist, Valli scored number-one hits with the songs "My Eyes Adored You" (1974) and "Grease" (1978).

Valli, Tommy DeVito, Nick Massi, and Bob Gaudio—the original members of the Four Seasons—were inducted into the Rock and Roll Hall of Fame in 1990 and the Vocal Group Hall of Fame in 1999. Valli is also a 2010 inductee of the New Jersey Hall of Fame, with the Four Seasons (Gaudio, Massi, DeVito, and Joe Long) inducted separately in 2017 and Valli speaking on Massi's behalf. Valli was awarded a star on the Hollywood Walk of Fame in May 2024, a joint star for both the Four Seasons and him. Valli appeared in person to accept the honor with his wife and two of his sons, and Gaudio sent a recorded acceptance speech. In February 2025, Valli was awarded a Grammy Lifetime Achievement Award, his first-ever Grammy.

== Early life ==
Valli was born Francesco Castelluccio to an Italian family in Newark, New Jersey; he is the eldest of three sons. Valli's father, Antonio (Anthony) Castelluccio, who was born in Jersey City to parents from Faiano, Salerno, Campania, was a barber and display designer for Lionel model trains; his mother, Donata Maria "Mary" Rinaldi, who immigrated from Avigliano, Potenza, Basilicata, was a homemaker and beer-company employee. His younger brothers are also singers, Alex Castelluccio (who died in 2025) and Bobby Valli, who is 15 years younger than Frankie; Bobby Valli occasionally sang with his brothers and also performed with the Classics IV, The Duprees, Joey Dee and the Starliters and Larry Chance. Valli was inspired to take up a singing career at age seven after Mary took him to see Frank Sinatra at the Paramount Theater in Manhattan, New York City. One of Valli's early favorite singers was "Texas" Jean Valli, from whom Valli took his stage name. Valli worked as a barber until he could support himself with music.

Valli's birth year has been called into question. He never addressed the issue himself until a 2007 posting at the official Frankie Valli site, sponsored by his record label Universal. Much of Valli's previous publicity used 1937 as his birth year, with his bandmates also having their birth dates adjusted later than reality to appeal to a younger demographic. Other sources gave Valli's year of birth as 1934, such as the Bear Family Records release The Four Lovers (BCD 15424) and a 1965 mug shot, available through The Smoking Gun.

== Music career ==
Valli began his singing career in 1951 with the Variety Trio (Nickie DeVito, Tommy DeVito, and Henry "Hank" Majewski), and was mentored in much of his early career by Nick Macioci, who later joined Valli in the Four Seasons, and by "Texas" Jean Valli, a female hillbilly singer, from whom he adopted the "Valli" surname. Geoff Herbert explains, "Frankie said in 2010 that Jean took him to meet music publishers Paul and Dave Kapp, telling them he was her brother. As a result, his first single was listed under 'Frankie Valley', and the name stuck—though he eventually changed it to the same spelling" that Texas Jean used. His desire to sing in public was initially granted when the group offered him a guest spot when they performed. In late 1952, the Variety Trio disbanded and Valli and Tommy DeVito became part of the house band at the Strand in New Brunswick, New Jersey. Valli played bass and sang.

Valli recorded his first single, "My Mother's Eyes", in 1953, a cover of the 1929 George Jessel song from Lucky Boy, with his stage name "Frankie Valley." Around this time, Valli, Majewski, and Tommy DeVito left the house band at the Strand and formed the Variatones with Frank Cottone and Billy Thompson. In 1956, the group impressed New York recording agent Peter Paul, and he got them an audition at RCA Victor a week later.

The group changed its name to the Four Lovers and recorded several singles and an album's worth of tracks. They had a minor hit with "You're the Apple of My Eye" in 1956, which earned them their first appearance on The Ed Sullivan Show. After two years of no further success, DeVito fired his brother and Majewski for insubordination (they had refused to take a gig opening for Tony Bennett) and creative differences, as Majewski's comic persona did not mesh with the group's musical talents. The Four Lovers continued, with Valli, DeVito, and an ad hoc lineup that variously included Macioci (by then also pursuing a solo career as "Nickie Massey"), Charles Calello and Hollywood Playboys keyboardist Hugh Garrity. In 1959, after being introduced at a gig in Baltimore by mutual friend Joe Pesci, Royal Teen Bob Gaudio became a member. By 1960, after several years of session work under numerous stage names, the lineup of Valli, DeVito, Gaudio, and a now-renamed Nick Massi took on the name "The 4 Seasons", taking the name from a bowling alley in Union, New Jersey that had rejected them after an audition.

In 1962, Valli and Gaudio shook hands on a side deal. As Gaudio told Time years later, "'We said, 'Neither one of us knows where we're going to wind up, but maybe we should hedge our bets. You get 50% of me, and I get 50% of you.'" The partners eventually "divided well over $50 million on the strength of their original handshake."

As the lead singer of the Four Seasons, Valli had a string of hits, beginning with the number-one hit "Sherry" in 1962 and continuing through most of the rest of the decade.

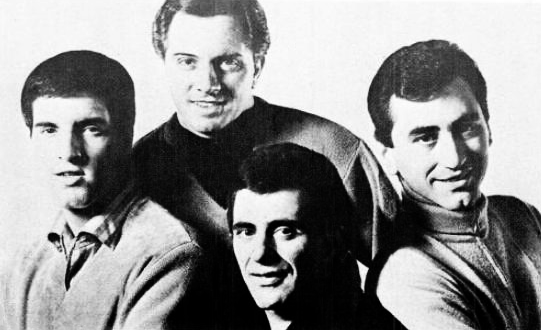
Valli (front, center) with the Four Seasons in 1966

During the 1960s, Gaudio and his songwriting partner Bob Crewe worked with Valli to craft solo recordings, the most successful of which was "Can't Take My Eyes Off You." It was rare at the time for major recording artists to perform solo while still recording with their own group. Valli's debut solo album was a collection of single releases and a few new recordings. He used the opportunity to transition away from the power falsetto that had made Valli and the Four Seasons famous, singing in a natural tenor voice. (Calello noted in 2000 that Valli's voice could go down to a baritone and that Valli would take on the baritone parts in harmony arrangements when he did not sing lead.)

"You're Ready Now" reached number 11 on the UK Singles Chart in December 1970, and "The Night" reached number seven on the UK Singles Chart in 1975. The same year, his single "My Eyes Adored You" hit number one on the Billboard Hot 100 and reached number five in the UK chart. This caused an awkward situation within the band, as Valli's label at the time, Private Stock Records, was willing to sign Valli, but not the band. Warner Bros. Records was willing to sign the band, but greatly preferred if someone other than Valli sang lead vocals. As part of that agreement, Valli—with great reluctance—ceded some of the lead vocals for the group to new band members Gerry Polci and to a lesser extent Don Ciccone. In the same year, he also had a number-six Billboard hit with the disco-laden "Swearin' to God" reaching number 31 in the UK chart, while further UK chart success came with "Fallen Angel", written by Guy Fletcher and Doug Flett. Valli was in the UK charts, reaching number 11. Meanwhile, the Four Seasons had a string of hits from their new LP Who Loves You in 1975; the title track with Valli, "December, 1963 (Oh, What a Night)" with Valli, Polci, and Ciccone, and minor hits "Silver Star" and "Down the Hall" (the latter from the follow-up album Helicon) with Polci alone. In 1976, Valli covered the Beatles song "A Day in the Life" for the ephemeral musical documentary All This and World War II, to which the Seasons also contributed a cover of "We Can Work It Out."

In 1978, with the Four Seasons temporarily broken up, Valli embarked on a solo tour and sang the theme song for the film version of the stage play Grease, a song by Barry Gibb of the Bee Gees, which became a number-one hit. He had two further chart successes over the next year: "Save Me, Save Me" in November 1978, which entered the Billboard Easy Listening chart, and "Fancy Dancer" in January 1979, which entered the pop charts.

Valli began suffering from otosclerosis in 1967, forcing him to "sing from memory" in the latter part of the 1970s. Surgery performed by Victor Goodhill, a Los Angeles ear specialist, restored most of his hearing by 1980.

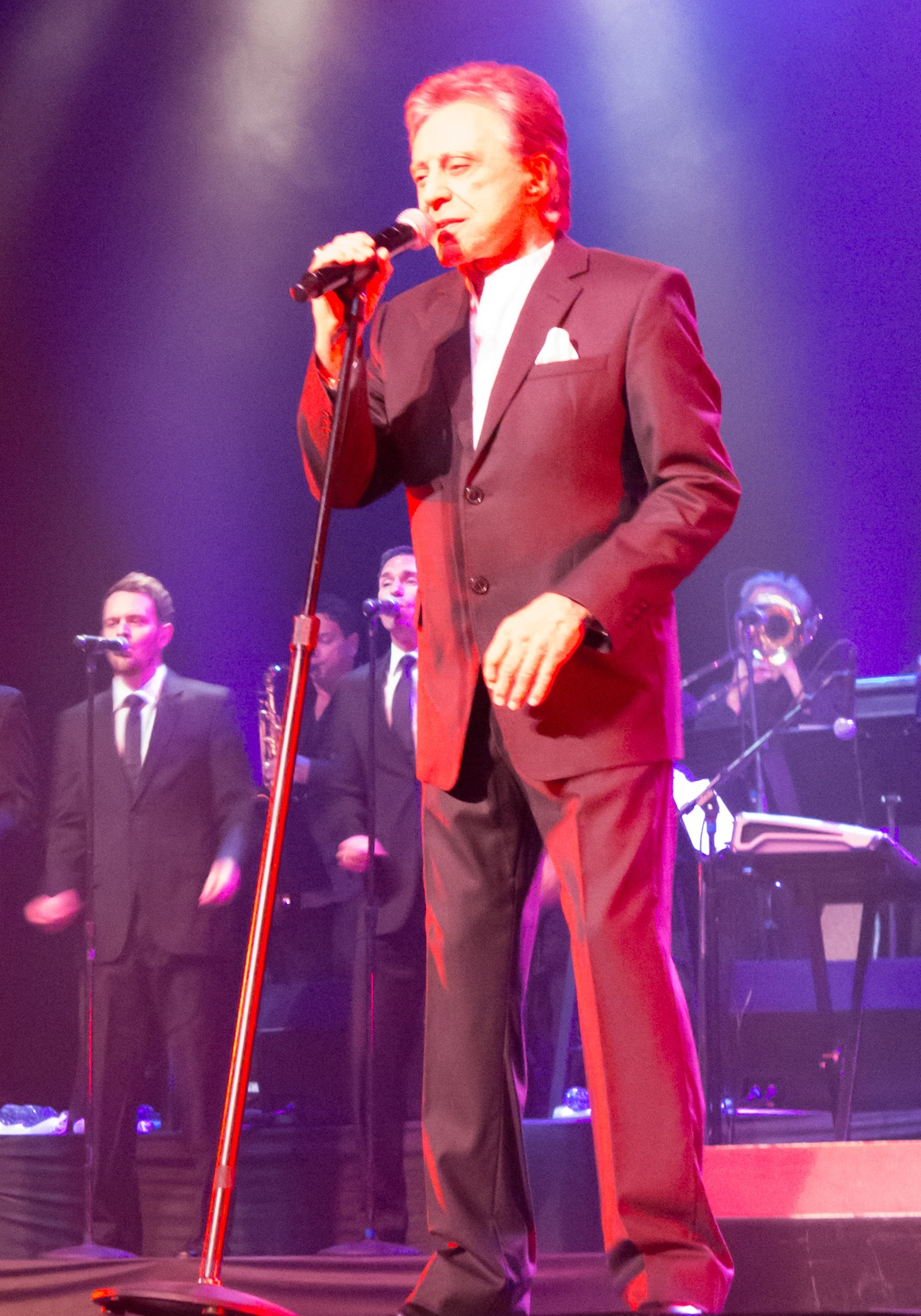
Valli performing at the Saban Theatre in 2013

In 2005, the musical Jersey Boys opened on Broadway. Besides performances of many of Frankie Valli and the Four Seasons hit recordings, it has a biographical narrative, told from four separate points of view by each member of the Four Seasons (DeVito, Valli, Massi, and Gaudio). John Lloyd Young portrayed Valli in the original production, while West End's production Ryan Molloy is the "longest-serving Frankie Valli". The musical dramatizes several real-life incidents from Valli's life, including his estrangement from daughter Francine, who died in 1980. The show has been widely acclaimed, financially successful, and was nominated for eight Tony Awards, winning four, notably Best Musical, Actor, and Supporting Actor. It has touring companies around the world, as well as a version at Paris Las Vegas, and was adapted into a 2014 film of the same name directed by Clint Eastwood, with Young again appearing as Valli; Valli was less enthusiastic about the film, believing that some parts were miscast and that Eastwood was a poor fit for the material.

In October 2007, Valli released Romancing the '60s, an album containing covers of his favorite songs from the 1960s, two of which—"Sunny" and "Any Day Now"—he had previously recorded. It was Valli's first solo album since 1980's Heaven Above Me. In 2012, Valli made his Broadway debut with a week-long concert engagement at the Broadway Theatre in New York City starting October 19.

From March 2016 to January 2017, "Frankie Valli and the Four Seasons" were touring the US, scheduled to play small to mid-sized venues such as the Silver Legacy Casino in Reno, Nevada, the Celebrity Theatre in Phoenix, Arizona, and the County Fair in Bloomsburg, Pennsylvania. In October 2016, Valli released his first solo album in nine years, 'Tis the Seasons, which features some of his favorite Christmas songs. As part of the BBC Proms in the Park Valli, together with the Four Seasons performed with the BBC Concert Orchestra in Hyde Park on September 10, 2016.

Frankie Valli and the Four Seasons continued touring in 2018 and 2019, with a new lineup after his lineup since 2003 spun off as its own act, the Modern Gentlemen. In 2020, the COVID-19 pandemic canceled all touring plans.

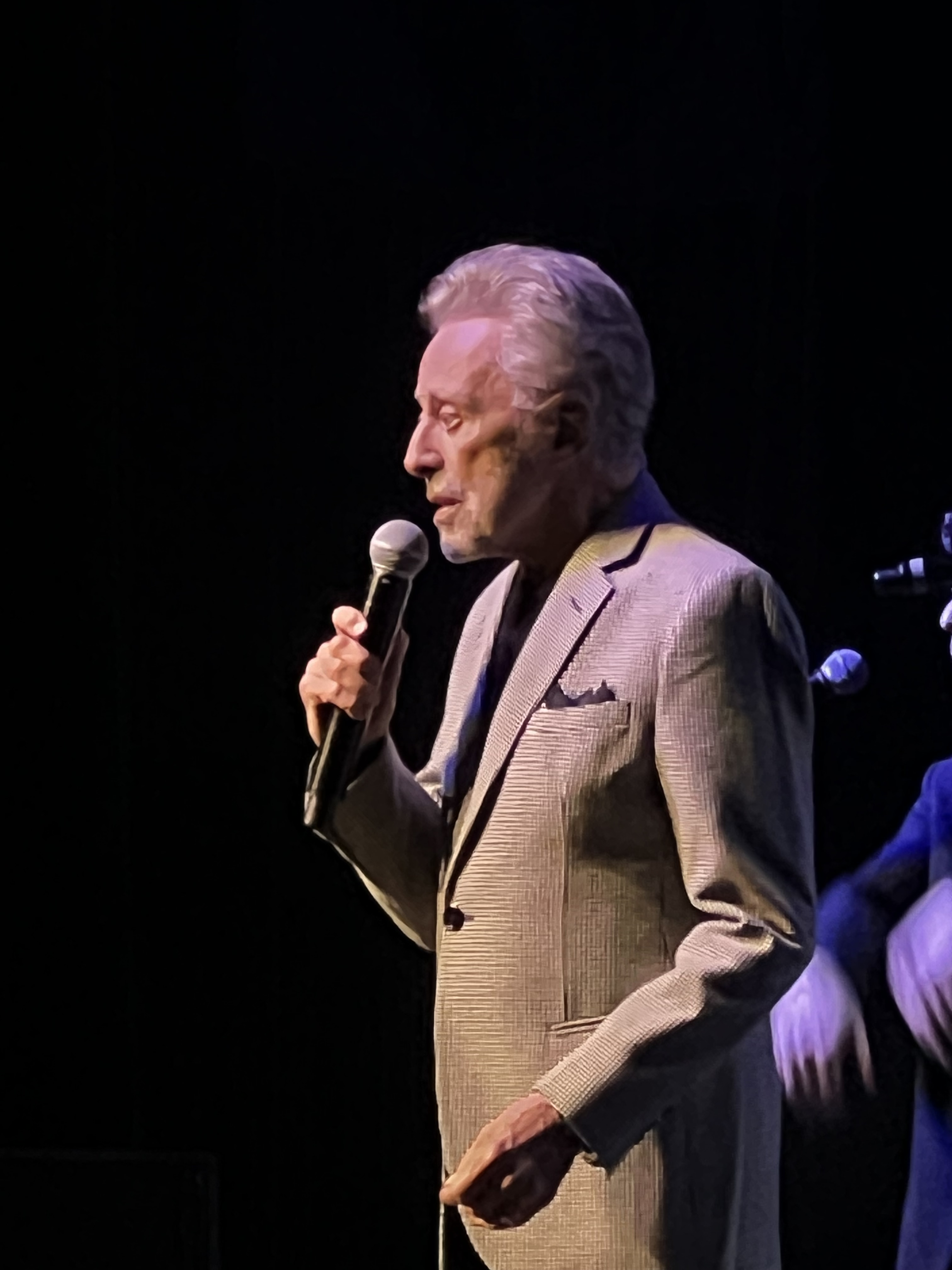
Valli performing at the Fox Theater in 2024

In June 2021, Valli released his 12th studio album, his first in five years, Touch of Jazz, which features a collection of jazz cover songs. Touring resumed in the summer of 2021 with dates scheduled through October 2024; in October 2023, Valli indicated that it would be his farewell tour and that the Four Seasons would effectively end their 65-year run with his retirement. Valli did not rule out future performances after the tour was to end, but noted that the nature of touring, and a move from longer residencies to frequent one-night stops, was wearing on him, while the actual act of performing each night was not. The tour was eventually extended into 2025, with representatives for Valli responding to criticism of him touring at such an advanced age and fears of elder abuse by assuring that Valli was "doing just fine and super happy to be still performing."

In 2024, The Washington Post investigated the accusations that Valli mimes his live singing, writing that the powerful "flawless falsetto" the audience hears does not match his lips, which "rarely move in sync to the music." Valli suggested the criticism is rooted in envy, saying, "if I can't make a note, I don't sing it." However, Valli conceded to People that he uses "layering [of] vocals and instrumentals" to maintain the group's signature sound in old age, a tactic the group had long used on its records, and stated he would continue touring as long as fans continued to buy tickets and respond well to the show. Responding in The Washington Post, musician Graham Nash said, "He's just lip-syncing badly to a tape. As a musician, if you're not singing, you shouldn't be onstage." Ann Wilson of Heart was more critical, saying: "His face is completely still. He looks like he's not even there...You really have to look at your morals and go, 'Do I just want to go up there and phone it in, give a [bullshit] performance because I'm me, or do I take the high road?'"

Valli's touring was abruptly halted in late September 2025 due to an unspecified illness. In December, Valli's team announced he was again scheduling concerts beginning in early 2026. A later announcement implied that Valli would be retiring in the near future and that his upcoming concert dates would be the last ones in those respective cities. Valli announced on May 29, 2026 that he had again halted his touring due to health issues for at least "the rest of the year" and instructed his promoters not to reschedule the remaining concerts. In August 2026, Valli's brother Bobby indicated that Frankie "would now retire." Valli's publicist denied this, writing on his Instagram on his behalf, "In spite of what you might have heard, I am not retired." In a statement, his brother apologized, writing that he "was misinformed."

== Acting career ==
Valli has appeared as an actor in Miami Vice (as Mafia boss Frank Doss), Full House, the 1998 TV movie Witness to the Mob (as Frank LoCascio of the Gambino crime family), The Sopranos (as mobster Rusty Millio), and the 2014 film And So It Goes.

On the November 21, 2014, episode of Hawaii Five-0 entitled "Ka Hana malu (Inside Job)", Valli played mysterious lawyer Leonard Cassano, who was engaged to Carol Burnett's character, Aunt Deb.

In 2015, Valli was interviewed on the AMC television series The Making of the Mob: New York.

== Personal life ==
Valli has been married four times. In his early 20s, he married his first wife, Mary, who already had a two-year-old daughter. They had two daughters together and divorced after 13 years in 1971. His stepdaughter and younger daughter both died in separate incidents in 1980. Valli married MaryAnn Hannigan in 1974, and the marriage lasted eight years. He married Randy Clohessy in 1984; they had three sons and divorced in 2004. Valli's surviving daughter later briefly married Four Seasons drummer/vocalist Gerry Polci, and their daughter Olivia Polci, who also adopted the stage surname Valli, is a professional stage actress. She portrayed her grandmother Mary in a Jersey Boys production in 2019. Frankie married Jackie Jacobs on June 26, 2023, in Las Vegas. Valli and Jacobs reside in Encino, California. Valli obtained a restraining order effective until 2027 against his eldest son for threats of violence against his father and brothers.

One issue in Valli's third divorce went up on appeal to the Supreme Court of California, whether a life insurance policy purchased in 2003 was community property. On May 15, 2014, the court unanimously affirmed the trial court's ruling that the policy was community property (and not Clohessy's separate property), in an opinion signed by Associate Justice Joyce Kennard.

== Discography ==
=== Studio albums ===
Date of release	Title	Billboard peak	Label	Catalog number
June 1967	The 4 Seasons Present Frankie Valli Solo	34	Philips	200-247 (Mono) / 600-247 (Stereo)
July 1968	Timeless	176	Philips	600-274
February 1975	Closeup	51	Private Stock	PS 2000
September 1975	Inside You (five new tracks plus four previously released tracks, remixed; "The Night" with the Four Seasons)	—	Motown	M6-852S1
November 1975	Our Day Will Come	107	Private Stock	PS 2006
September 1976	Valli	—	Private Stock	PS 2017
November 1977	Lady Put the Light Out	—	Private Stock	PS 7002
August 1978	Frankie Valli... Is the Word	160	Warner Bros/Curb	BS 3233
November 1980	Heaven Above Me	—	MCA/Curb	5134
October 2007	Romancing the '60s	167	Cherry Entertainment/Universal Motown	B0009908-02
October 2016	'Tis the Seasons	—	Rhino	R2556984
June 2021	A Touch of Jazz	—	Green Hill Music	B0942DW3VX
