= More Action =

Album by ? and the Mysterians

Studio album by ? and the Mysterians
- Released: May 25, 1999
- Recorded: 1966, January 17–25, 1998
- Studio: Krispy-Kreme, New York
- Genre: Garage rock; proto-punk
- Length: 1:05:45
- Label: Cavestomp!
- Producer: ? And the Mysterians, David Mann, Jon Weiss, Luvern Thompson

? and the Mysterians chronology
| ? & the Mysterians (1997) | More Action (1999) | Feel It! The Best of ? and the Mysterians (2001) |

Professional ratings
Review scores
| Source | Rating |
|---|---|
| AllMusic | 3/5 stars |

More Action is the fourth studio album by the American garage rock band ? and the Mysterians, and was released on May 25, 1999, on Cavestomp Records. The album provides a summary of the band's initial tenure in the 1960s, and also functions as a survey of the group's re-recordings of their recording history between 1966 and 1969, along with new material.

== Background ==
Since the owners of (?) Question Mark and the Mysterians' original recordings refused to release CD reissues of the band's two albums, the group would reunite to record new versions of their past songs. Included in the album are the group's more important tracks such as "96 Tears", "Can't Get Enough of You Baby", and "Girl (You Captivate Me)". Most of the rereleased songs can also be found on the band's two albums, 96 Tears and Action.

Of special note are the two previously unreleased tracks recorded for a single prior to the sessions for "96 Tears", "Are You For Real?" and "I'll Be Back". These were recorded in Detroit on February 12, 1966. These are the first Question Mark and the Mysterians studio recordings ever. These were not released at that time due to the murder of the studio owner.

The three tracks on the More Action album that had been singles peaked at the following positions on the Billboard Hot 100: "96 Tears" at number one, "Girl (You Captivate Me)" at number 98, and "Can't Get Enough of You Baby" at number 56. In particular, "96 Tears" was an influential song in the musical genre of garage rock for its low-budget recording process and signature Farfisa organ riff. Alongside the rerecorded material, the band penned new compositions including "It's Not Easy" and "I'll Be Back". Cover versions of the Suicide classic "Cheree", the Rolling Stones' song "(I Can't Get No) Satisfaction" and Bobby Darin's "Beachcomber" were also recorded in the same sessions. Moreover, the album features an alternate take of "96 Tears" in Spanish, and early demos by the group in 1966.

== Track listing ==
All tracks composed by Rudy Martinez except where noted.

=== Disc one ===
1. "Don't Give It Up Now" (Jeff "Monoman" Conolly) – 3:36
2. "Feel It" – 3:27
3. "Hangin' on a String" – 2:21
4. "96 Tears" – 3:08
5. "Girl (You Captivate Me)" – 2:20
6. "Can't Get Enough of You, Baby" (Sandy Linzer, Denny Randell ) – 2:13
7. "Ain't It a Shame" – 3:02
8. "Cheree" (Martin Rev, Alan Vega) – 3:46
9. "Beachcomber" (Bobby Darin) – 1:52
10. "It's Not Easy" – 2:57
11. "I'll Be Back" – 4:59

=== Disc two ===
1. "That's How Strong My Love Is" (Roosevelt Jamison) – 3:30
2. "Love Me Baby (Cherry July)" – 2:40
3. "Sally Go Round the Roses" (Zell Sanders, Abner Spector) – 3:57
4. "Don't Hold It Against Me" (Lor Crane, B. Ross) – 2:02
5. "Do You Feel It" – 2:56
6. "(I Can't Get No) Satisfaction" (Mick Jagger, Keith Richards) – 3:51
7. "Strollin' with the Mysterians" – 2:42
8. "Are You for Real?" – 2:45
9. "I'll Be Back" – 2:24
10. "96 Tears" (in Spanish) – 5:17

== Personnel ==
=== ? and the Mysterians ===
- "?" (Rudy Martinez) – vocals
- Robert Lee Balderrama – lead guitar, backing vocals
- Frank Lugo – bass guitar
- Robert Martinez – drums
- Little Frank Rodriguez Jr. – keyboards, backing vocals

=== Technical ===
- ? And the Mysterians, Jon Weiss, Luvern Thompson – producers
- David Mann – engineer, producer
- Alan Douches – mastering
- Michael Calleia at Industrial Strength Design – design
- Terry Murphy – photography (cover)
- Larry Rodarte – photography (inner sleeve)
