= Dome La Muerte =

Italian musician (born 1958)

- Born: May 18, 1958 (age 67)
- Origin: Pisa, Italy
- Genres: Hardcore punk Psychedelic music Rock
- Occupation: Guitarist
- Instrument(s): Guitar, vocals
- Years active: 1975–present
- Labels: Electric Eye Records; Spittle Records; Area Pirata; Go Down Records

Dome La Muerte, pseudonym of Domenico Petrosino (born 18 May 1958), is an Italian guitarist, songwriter and disc jockey.

He is one of the greatest representatives of the Italian hardcore punk movement of the 80s.

== Biography ==
=== The early years and the CCM ===
Self-taught guitarist, he joined Upper Jaw Mask at the age of 17, a rock-funky-blues band, with whom he recorded a 45 rpm.

From this first experience in 1979 the Cheetah Chrome Motherfuckers were born, one of the first Italian hardcore punk bands, protagonists of the GDHC (Gran Ducato Hard Core) scene. With the CCMs he will tour Italy and Europe and will participate in the well-known Last White Christmas concert on 4 December 1983 organized by the GDHC which will be released in the United States on double cassette.

=== The meeting with Not Moving ===
At the end of a concert held in Piacenza, he is approached by Not Moving who have lost their guitarist and ask him to come in with them. After a bit of hesitation also related to the distance between Pisa and Piacenza, he accepts too because he is looking for new sounds. In 1984 on the eve of CCM's American tour and after a year in which he played with two bands, he left the band from Pisa to devote himself solely to Not Moving. It is in this period that the nickname Dome La Muerte was born, which he will use in the artistic field from then on.

With Not Moving he opens The Clash concerts at the PalaLido in Milan, by Johnny Thunders (former New York Dolls) for three Italian dates, and plays at the Loft in Berlin with Litfiba, Pankow and Monuments in an evening dedicated to Italian rock. The positive feedback from the lives and albums Black 'N' Wild and Sinnermen also allowed him to pass on RAI together with the band.

After the internal split with Not Moving in 1989, he remains in the band where he will release the last two albums Song of Myself (with many guests including Giovanni Lindo Ferretti of CCCP and the cheyenne poet Lance Henson) and Homecomings, both close to the indigenous cause, a theme very dear to him that he will also take up in subsequent projects. One of the Homecomings concerts was broadcast by Videomusic. With the new lineup he plays shoulder to Nick Cave and the Bad Seeds on the dates in Rome and Milan. With Not Moving, together with Lance Henson, opens the concert of John Trudell, American singer-songwriter and actor of Dakota origin. In 1996 he definitively disbanded Not Moving.

=== Later bands and other experiences ===
In 1996 he founded Hush, a grunge band, precursor of the stoner, with whom he will record an album and open a concert by The Fleshtones.

In the same year he was invited to "America America", a tribute to the Americanist Fernanda Pivano, in Conegliano Veneto together with Allen Ginsberg, Jay McInerney, Fabrizio De André, Francesco Guccini and others.

In this period he collaborates as a guitarist in MGZ and Le Signore, an electronic punk theater-cabaret project.

In 1997 he plays the guitar for the soundtrack of the film Nirvana by Gabriele Salvatores.

In 2006, following the release of Live in 80's, he reunites with Not Moving for a tour where they will also be the shoulder to Iggy Pop. At the end of that year he returns to rock'n'roll and punk with the Dome La Muerte & The Diggers project, which is his longest-running project to date. In the first album, among the guests, Rudi Protrudi of the Fuzztones. The second album, Diggersonz, to fully recover the rock'n'roll roots, is recorded entirely in analogue by Jorge "Dr. Explosion "Muñoz-Cobo Gonzalez at Estudios Circo Perrotti in Gijón in Spain, a studio famous throughout Europe for rock'n'roll productions, hosting bands such as The Chesterfield Kings and The Cynics.

In 2011 he made his first album in his own name only Poems for Renegades, where he reaffirms his love for the west and the music of spaghetti westerns. In the album, almost entirely acoustic, there are two tracks with lyrics by Lance Henson and many guests including Maurizio Curadi of Steeplejack.

In 2012 he starts a live project, still active, paired with the Italian-Greek singer Marina Mulopulos (former Almamegretta), in which he brings around a repertoire that includes songs by David Bowie, Velvet Underground, Iggy Pop, Judy Henske, Janis Joplin and many others.

In 2014 he joins the Avvoltoi, a historic Italian band with whom he will record a record and a live.

In 2015 he also plays steadily with Lupe Velez, the first solo project by Stefano Ilari, punk rocker from Livorno, then a stable band, with whom he records the first ep Mystic Man.

In 2016 he forms the duo Ashvin with Tony Vallini producing the psy-trance CD Brothers and Sisters.

In 2017 he put on another Dome La Muerte EXP project. Here the music is a western-psychedelic instrumental, linked to the soundtracks of the so-called B series films.

As a DJ, he worked as a resident in the 90s at Baraonda, a well-known disco-pub in Massa, a meeting point for rockers from the Tuscan coast. His DJ activity will continue in many clubs in Tuscany and beyond.

=== Not Moving LTD ===
In 2018 he reunites again with Not Moving which, having replaced bass and keyboards with a second guitar, are renamed Not Moving LTD. Left to do ten concerts, they will do thirty in eight months and will release a single. He is currently working with them on the release of a new album.

=== The cinema ===
In the field of cinema he played the character of a rock'n'roll gravedigger in the comedy Dreams of Glory with Carlo Monni, released in theaters in 2014. One of his songs is used in the soundtrack of the film. Instead, he appears as himself in the documentary Italian Punk Hardcore 1980–1989: Il film. In the film Nico, 1988 by Susanna Nicchiarelli, which tells the last years of the career of the singer Nico, muse of the Velvet Underground, the character of Domenico Petrosino played by Thomas Trabacchi appears. The film narrates the real events in which our host hosts the German star at home and accompanies her on the Italian tour.

=== The Bacchelli Law ===
On November 25, 2020, he gives an interview to Rolling Stone where he announces that he is in difficulty following the interruption of concerts in Italy due to the covid, and therefore intends to request the benefit of the Bacchelli Law. To support this cause, a subscription was launched on Change.org where over 4000 signatures were collected.

=== The Book ===
On 3 December 2020 his autobiography Dalla parte del torto. Una storia hippie punk e rave is released. A hippie punk and rave story, co-written with Pablito El Drito, edited by Agenzia X.

== Discography ==
=== With Upper Jaw Mask ===
- 1978 – Whiskers-Zak-Zero (7-inch, Cessofonya Records)

=== With Cheetah Chrome Motherfuckers ===
- 1981 – 400 Fascists (7-inch EP, Cessofonya Records)
- 1983 – Sfregio Permanente / Permanent Scare (LP, Children of the Revolution Records)
- 1983 – (We Are The) Juvenile Delinquency (MC, self-production)
- 1984 – Last White Christmas, II (MC Compilation, Bad Compilation Tapes)
- 1984 – International P.E.A.C.E. Benefit Compilation (LP, Compilation, R Radical Records)
- 1985 – Furious Party (7-inch EP, Belfagor Records)
- 1985 – Single Ticket To Paradise (7-inch Compilation, Neg Fx)
- 1985 – Flipside Vinyl Fanzine Vol 2 (LP Compilation, Flipside Records)
- 2017 – The Furious Era 1979/1987 (LP Compilation, Area Pirata)

=== With Not Moving ===
- 1983 – Movin Over (7-inch, Electric Eye Records)
- 1985 – Black' N' Wild (12-inch EP, Spittle Records)
- 1986 – Sinnermen (LP, Spittle Records)
- 1987 – Jesus Loves His Children (12-inch EP, Spittle Records)
- 1988 – Flash on You (LP, Electric Eye Records)
- 1989 – Song of Myself (LP, Wide Records)
- 1992 – Flash On You / Dancing (12-inch singolo, V.I.T.R.I.O.L.)
- 1995 – Homecomings (CD, Pick Up Records)
- 2003 – Land of Nothing (LP, Area Pirata)
- 2005 – Live in 80's (CD+DVD, Go Down Records)
- 2007 – Wild Sound From The Past Dimension (LP Compilation, Go Down Records)
- 2011 – Light/Dark: Singles And Eps, 1982-1987 (LP Compilation, Spit / Fire)

=== With Hush ===
- 1996 – Om (CD, Toast Records)

=== As Dome La Muerte and The Diggers ===
- 2007 – Dome La Muerte and The Diggers (CD, Go Down Records)
- 2007 – Sorry, I'm A Digger (7-inch, Area Pirata)
- 2008 – Rock Sound 116 (CD Compilation, Rock Sound)
- 2010 – Diggersonz (LP, Go Down Records/Area Pirata)
- 2010 – Bored 'n' Lazy (7-inch, Area Pirata)
- 2013 – Supersadobabi (LP, Go Down Records)
- 2013 – If You Fight (7-inch, Surfin' Ki Records/Go Down Records)

=== As Dome La Muerte ===
- 2011 – Poems For Renegades (CD, Japanapart Records)

=== With gli Avvoltoi ===
- 2014 – Amagama (LP, Go Down Records)
- 2014 – Il nostro è solo un mondo beat - 25° Anniversario - Live at Sidro (LP, Go Down Records)
- 2019 – Questo gioco rende eroi (CD Compilation, Altini)

=== With Lupe Velez ===
- 2015 – Mystic man (CD EP, Area Pirata)

=== With Ashvin ===
- 2016 – Brothers and Sisters (CD, Veleno Music)

=== As Dome La Muerte E.X.P. ===
- 2017 – Lazy Sunny Day (LP, Go Down Records, Cinedelic Records)
- 2023 - El Santo (LP, Go Down Records)

=== With Not Moving LTD ===
- 2019 – Lady Wine – (7-inch, Area Pirata)

=== Participation in other projects ===
- 1988 – The Ravings – Anti-Nature Will
- 1989 – The Unlimited – The Unlimited
- 1989 – Wilderness – Underground
- 1995 – MGZ – Cambio Vita
- 1997 – Mauro Pagani / Federico De Robertis – Nirvana (soundtrack)
- 2000 – MGZ & Le Signore – Karakiri
- 2005 – Spina Nel Fianco – Sulla Cattiva Strada
- 2008 – David Petrosino – Slices
- 2010 – The Headbangers – Hate Song (7-inch)
- 2018 – Lupe Velez – Weird tales
- 2018 – Gualty – Transistor

== Filmography ==
- Snellinberg, John (2014). Sogni di gloria.
- Bitonto, Angelo; Senesi, Giorgio S.; Sivilia, Roberto (2015). Italian Punk Hardcore: 1980–1989 Il Film – The movie. LoveHate80, F.O.A.D. Records.

== Bibliography ==
- Philopat, Marco (2006). Lumi di punk: la scena italiana raccontata dai protagonisti. Milan, Italy: Agenzia X. ISBN 978-8895029085.
- Cecchi, Antonio (2017). No more pain. Viaggio nell'anima. Pisa: Ed. Area Pirata Record. ISBN 978-8894207606.
- Reverendo Lys (2019). Born Losers - Pepite e lastre di selce. Milano: Arcana. ISBN 978-8862316637.
- El Drito, Pablito (2020). Dalla parte del torto. Una storia hippie punk e rave. Milano: Agenzia X. ISBN 978-8831268271.

== Related Voices ==
- Indigenous peoples of the Americas
