= Question Mark & the Mysterians (album) =

Album by ? and the Mysterians

Studio album by ? and the Mysterians
- Released: November 4, 1997
- Recorded: July 17–24, 1997
- Genre: Rock
- Length: 40:21
- Label: Collectables
- Producer: Chad Cunningham

? and the Mysterians chronology
Action (1966)	Question Mark & the Mysterians (1997)	More Action (1999)

Professional ratings
Review scores
Source	Rating
AllMusic	3/5 stars

Question Mark & the Mysterians is the third studio album by the garage rock band ? and the Mysterians, known for their No. 1 1966 hit "96 Tears". The album was recorded by the original members of the band as a result of their inability to access their masters or re-release their own earlier material, which had passed from the ownership of label Cameo to Allen Klein. It included all of the songs released on their first album, 96 Tears, as well as several other tracks. The rerecorded version of "96 Tears" was subsequently incorporated into compilations.

== Background ==
In the 1960s, Michigan-based band ? & the Mysterians found a regional hit with the song "96 Tears", particularly popular in Texas. The song was originally released on the Pa-Go-Go label, but aggressive offers from several larger distributors resulted in their selling the master to Cameo. Cameo shortened the recording and distributed the single nationally, resulting in a No. 1 Billboard hit. The band subsequently released several singles and two albums, 96 Tears and Action, on the label. In 1968, the entire catalogue of Cameo-Parkway releases, including those by ? & the Mysterians, were purchased by Allen Klein. Klein refused to permit "96 Tears" to be included on compilations or to permit their albums to be reissued, so in 1997 members of the band, including its vocalist, came together after a studio recording hiatus of several decades to re-record their original songs. The eponymous album was the first of two such re-recordings by the band, who were subsequently able to license their new version of the song for compilations. It would be October 2005 before Klein's company, ABKCO Records, would make a CD of the original releases, The Best of ? & the Mysterians: Cameo Parkway 1966–1967.

== Album ==
The new album included all 12 tracks from the original album 96 Tears, plus an additional four. Two of the tracks, "Smokes" and "Got To", were included on the band's second album, Action. The other two songs, "Do Something to Me" and "Make You Mine", had been released as singles in 1967 and 1968. In its review, Allmusic notes that although the album is made by the original line-up, the material doesn't sound the same as it did when first released, but adds that "the group sounds tough, dynamic, and exciting...these guys can still kick hard, which is what makes the record worthwhile for die-hard garage freaks."

== Track listing ==
All songs written by Rudy Martinez, except where noted.

1. "96 Tears" – 3:01
2. "Midnight Hour" – 2:52
3. "I Need Somebody" – 2:12
4. "'8' Teen" – 2:46
5. "Smokes" – 1:50
6. "Got To" – 2:38
7. "Do Something to Me" (Jimmy Calvert, Norman Marzano, Paul Naumann) – 2:32
8. "Stormy Monday" (traditional) – 3:45
9. "Up Side" – 2:56
10. "Don't Break This Heart of Mine" – 2:02
11. "Ten O'Clock" – 2:24
12. "Why Me" – 1:45
13. "You're Telling Me Lies" – 2:29
14. "Don't Tease Me" – 1:37
15. "Set Aside" – 2:48
16. "Make You Mine" – 2:44

== Personnel ==
=== Musicians ===
- ? (Rudy Martinez) – vocals
- Robert Balderrama – lead guitar
- Frank Lugo – bass guitar
- Frank Rodriguez – organ
- Robert Martinez – drums

=== Technical ===
- Chad Cunningham – engineer, producer
- Nicole Ruhl Fichera – jacket design
- David Graham – arranger
- Thomas Kaekel – photography
- Stephen Kaplan – photography, production supervisor
- Mike Kryger – engineer
- Jerry Schollenberger – research
- Harry Young – liner notes, research
