= Abshire =

Abshire is a surname. People with it include:

- Ariel Abshire (born 1991), American singer/songwriter
- Brian Abshire (born 1963), American long-distance runner
- David Manker Abshire (1926–2014), American diplomat and political figure
- Nathan Abshire (1913–1981), American Cajun accordion player
