= BCT =

BCT may refer to:

- Boca Raton Airport (IATA: BCT), in Palm Beach County, Florida
- Baire category theorem, a result from general topology
- Banque Centrale de Tunisie, Tunisia
- Basic Cadet Training, initial military training for new cadets at the United States Air Force Academy
- Basic Combat Training
- Bat Conservation Trust, a British charity
- Boise Contemporary Theater, a professional theater company in Boise, Idaho in the United States
- Box compression test, a measure in corrugated fiber board packaging design and testing
- Brigade combat team, the basic deployable unit of maneuver in the United States Army
- Broward County Transit, a Fort Lauderdale-based system of public transportation
- Bucks County Transport, bus transportation organization in Pennsylvania
- Buffalo Central Terminal, a railroad station located in Buffalo, New York
- The old station code for Mumbai Central railway station in India
- BC Transit, the company responsible for public transit in most of British Columbia
- Body Centered Tetragonal, a type of crystal structure, see Tetragonal crystal system
- Business Chinese Test, see List of language proficiency tests § Mandarin
- Bad Compilation Tapes, an independent punk/hardcore music label
