= The Last Vegas (album) =

Studio album by The Last Vegas
- Released: January 2008
- Recorded: 2007
- Genre: Hard rock, heavy metal, glam metal
- Label: Self-released

The Last Vegas chronology
High Class Trash (2007)	The Last Vegas (2008)	Whatever Gets You Off (2009)

The Last Vegas is the third full-length album by the Chicago based hard rock band with the same name.

6 of the 13 songs on the album were later re-recorded for the band's major label debut Whatever Gets You Off released in 2009 on Eleven Seven Music.

The album's musical style was described as a mix of glam rock, sleaze rock and garage rock, with some elements of southern rock and punk rock.

Although being the band's third full-length, it was recorded after the band left Get Hip Records and was self-released, though gaining no promotion at all. It was the band's second full-length album with Chad Cherry on vocals.

== Track listing ==
No.	Title	Length
1.	"High Class Trash"	3:46
2.	"So Young, So Pretty, So What"	4:01
3.	"Loose Lips"	4:46
4.	"Good Deal for Bad Time"	2:58
5.	"Velvet Cream"	3:26
6.	"Just One Look"	5:36
7.	"Room at the Top"	3:45
8.	"Another Lover"	4:01
9.	"White Lies"	5:00
10.	"The Cruelty"	3:00
11.	"Dead Roses"	3:09
12.	"Love Me (When I'm Bad)"	5:21
13.	"Outta My Mind"	3:03

== Personnel ==
- Chad Cherry - lead vocals
- Adam Arling - guitar
- Johnny Wator – guitar
- Anthony Rubino – bass
- Nate Arling - drums
