= High Class Trash =

EP by The Last Vegas
- Released: July 1, 2007
- Genre: Hard rock, metal
- Label: Self-released

The Last Vegas chronology
Seal the Deal (2006)	High Class Trash (2007)	The Last Vegas (2008)

High Class Trash is the first EP and third release overall by Chicago-based hard rock band the Last Vegas, released on July 1, 2007.

The EP was the band's first self-released release, as it was after the band split from their previous label Get Hip Records. The EP was released especially to spotlight the song "Raw Dog" (titled here as "Raw Dog Master"), from the band's previous album Seal the Deal, which was featured earlier in the video game Guitar Hero II.

It is the band's first release with new singer Chad Cherry.

== Track listing ==
No.	Title	Length
1.	"Do or Die"
2.	"Hot Leather"
3.	"To the Bone"
4.	"Don't Waste Your Time"
5.	"Raw Dog Master"

== Personnel ==
- Chad Cherry - lead vocals
- Adam Arling - guitar
- Johnny Wator – guitar
- Anthony Rubino – bass
- Nate Arling - drums, percussion
