= Bad Decisions =

Bad Decisions may refer to:

- Bad Decisions (The Last Vegas album), 2012
- Bad Decisions, an unreleased album by Lil Twist
- Bad Decisions, a 2021 EP by RedHook
- "Bad Decisions" (Benny Blanco, BTS and Snoop Dogg song), 2022
- "Bad Decisions" (The Strokes song), 2020
- "Bad Decisions", a song by Ariana Grande from Dangerous Woman, 2016
- "Bad Decisions", a song by Bad Omens from The Death of Peace of Mind, 2022
- "Bad Decisions", a song by Bastille from Doom Days, 2019
- "Bad Decisions", a song by Two Door Cinema Club from Gameshow, 2016
