= OJM =

OJM may refer to:

- Mozambican Youth Organisation (Organização da Juventude Moçambicana)
- Oregon Jewish Museum
- OJM (band), an Italian rock band
