= ? and the Mysterians =

Mexican American garage rock band

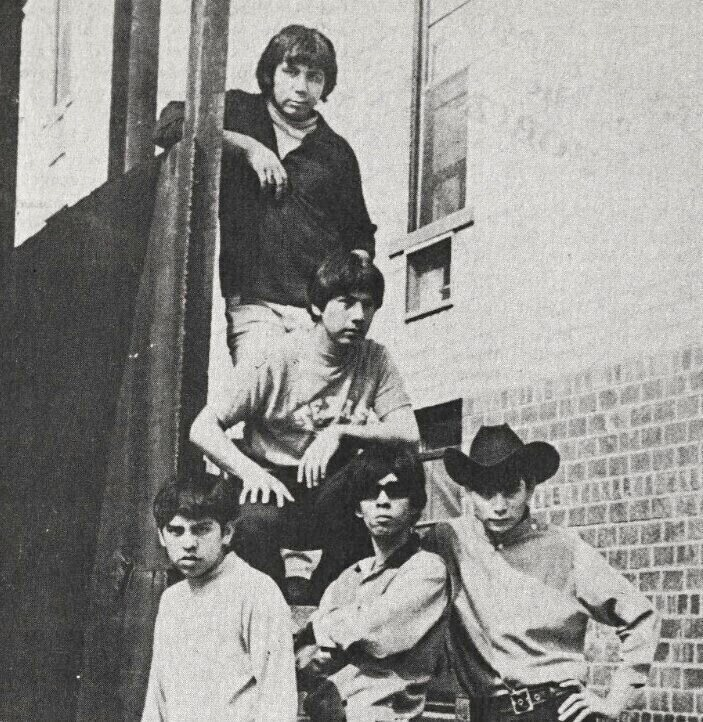

Background information
- Origin: Bay City and Saginaw, Michigan, U.S.
- Genres: Garage rock; proto-punk
- Years active: 1962–present
- Labels: Cameo-Parkway; Capitol; Norton; Luv; Tangerine; Pa-Go-Go
- Members: Question Mark (Rudy Martínez); Frankie Rodríguez; Bobby Balderrama; Robert Martínez; Frank Lugo
- Past members: Larry Borjas; Eddie Serrato; Mel Schacher; Frank Montoya; Irwin Aronson; Gus Sweers; Paul Miller; Richard Schultz; Scott Fulkerson; Randy Hitts; Dennis Dean Lack; Timothy Reed; Randy Iamurri; Willy C Worden; Mark Bliesener
- Website: 96tears.net (archived)

? and the Mysterians (Question Mark and the Mysterians or The Mysterians) are an American garage rock band from Bay City and Saginaw in Michigan, initially active between 1962 and 1969. Much of the band's music consisted of electric organ-driven garage rock and an enigmatic image inspired by the 1957 Japanese science fiction film The Mysterians. The band's sound was also marked by the raw, resonating lead vocals of "?" (Question Mark, the stage name of Rudy Martínez), making Question Mark and the Mysterians one of the earliest groups whose musical style is described as punk rock. Their music and imagery were highly influential on later bands.

The band signed to Pa-Go-Go Records (based in San Antonio, Texas and run by Rudy "Tee" Gonzales) in 1966 and released its first and most acclaimed single, "96 Tears", in the early part of that year. "96 Tears" became a number one hit on the Billboard Hot 100 and propelled the group to a 15-month period of national prominence. Their debut album, 96 Tears, followed. Though Question Mark and the Mysterians were unable to replicate that success with their later recordings, they did reach the singles charts on four occasions.

They disbanded in 1969, but have regrouped and released additional material over the years. "96 Tears" was listed at number 210 on the 2004 Rolling Stone list The 500 Greatest Songs of All Time.

== History ==
=== Formation and "96 Tears" ===
The band members were children of Mexican migrant farmers who settled in Michigan. The original trio, consisting of Larry Borjas (guitar), Robert Martinez (drums), and Bobby Balderrama (lead guitar), encountered one another and were motivated by surf rock bands and instrumentalists like Link Wray and Duane Eddy to form a group in 1962. The band played locally with the same lineup until the influence of the British Invasion with groups stressing lead vocals and dynamic stage performances. Rudy Martinez, aka Question Mark, was known for his dancing ability and was suggested to the band as he was Robert Martinez's brother. Question Mark was an eccentric figure, publicly stating that his soul had originated from Mars and that he once walked on Earth with the dinosaurs. "?" quickly cemented himself as the group's creative force, and they began to develop a blend of gritty rock and roll and pop rock with a repertoire that encompassed compositions penned by the Beatles and the Rolling Stones. To correspond with the new lineup, the band took the name ? and the Mysterians, which was inspired by the 1957 science fiction film The Mysterians. When the band recruited keyboard player Frank Rodriguez, who was a part of another local group, the Trespassers, it was pivotal in Question Mark and the Mysterians' overall sound, especially in their song "96 Tears".

In February 1966, the band auditioned for an independent record label, resulting in the demos "Are You For Real?" and "I'll Be Back", which were only released later and boasted for their very good sound quality in the 1999 album More Action. Afterwards, Larry Borjas and Robert Martinez received draft notices and opted to enlist to avoid being sent to Vietnam. The remaining band members continued while Rodriguez improvised an organ riff, and "?" introduced a composition he had been developing for a while in his head. Auditioning for a replacement drummer resulted in Eddie Serrato, originally trained in traditional Mexican music, joining the group. Frank Lugo played bass. With this lineup, Question Mark and the Mysterians recorded "96 Tears" along with "Midnight Hour" for the small Pa-Go-Go label, under label executive and record producer Lilly Gonzales who supervised the band at her 4-track recording studio in Bay City.

When released in April 1966, "Midnight Hour" was originally the A-side for the band's debut single; however, "?" promoted the record across Michigan, encouraging radio stations to play "96 Tears" instead. CKLW, a major station in Windsor, Ontario, extensively played the song, thus generating a number one regional hit. The song drew the attention of Neil Bogart, president of Cameo-Parkway Records. The success of the song was attributed to the Vox Continental riff, and, as critic Greg Shaw explained, the simplicity and precise execution. Bogart purchased the rights to "96 Tears", distributed it on a national scale, and promoted the band by booking television appearances on American Bandstand and Where the Action Is. On October 29, 1966, after a steady climb up the charts, the single peaked at number one on the Billboard Hot 100 for a week before being overtaken by the Monkees' "Last Train to Clarksville". It sold over one million copies, and was awarded a gold disc by the RIAA.

=== Other chart successes ===
The next two singles for Question Mark and the Mysterians, "I Need Somebody" and "Can't Get Enough of You Baby", also charted, but were nowhere near as successful as "96 Tears". These were compiled on the album 96 Tears along with a handful of other songs.

Question Mark and the Mysterians' second album, Action, featured the band at the peak of its musicianship, but the album was not a commercial success. The band then briefly recorded with Capitol Records, Tangerine Records and Super K. The band lineup changed as the original members left for other projects. Mel Schacher, future bass player for Grand Funk Railroad, briefly became the bass guitarist along with Frank Montoya on guitar and Jeff McDonald on drums until Richard Schultz took over on bass and co-wrote several songs with Question Mark; including "She Goes to Church on Sunday", which was licensed to Paul McCartney's publishing company.

=== 1970s, 1980s and 1990s ===
In the early 1970s, Question Mark and the Mysterians reformed with a different lineup consisting of two guitars and no keyboards. The band attracted the attention of rock critic Dave Marsh, who coined the term "punk rock" in a 1971 Creem Magazine article about Question Mark. In 1984, the original lineup of Question Mark and the Mysterians held a reunion concert in Dallas, Texas. Original drummer Robert Martinez returned and replaced Eddie Serrato on drums after Serrato became ill with multiple sclerosis. The Dallas concert did not lead to a full revival for the band, but the concert was recorded and released by the New York record label ROIR, 96 Tears Forever: The Dallas ReUnion Tapes.

In 1992, Question Mark collaborated with rap artist Saltine aka The Mad Rapper on a hip hop remake of "96 Tears". The single was released on Pandisc Records following a huge industry buzz on radio. Billboard magazine gave the single a thumbs up.

In 1997, Question Mark and the Mysterians reformed again. They collaborated with New York promoter Jon Weiss, who made the band headliners at CaveStomp garage rock festivals. The festivals featured many revived 1960s garage and psychedelic acts. In 1998, the cover version of "Can't Get Enough of You, Baby" by Smash Mouth reached number 14 on the US record chart.

=== Re-release of 96 Tears ===
During the 1990s, Question Mark and the Mysterians wanted to re-release their now out-of-print albums 96 Tears and Action, but were unable to because the song rights now belonged to record executive Allen Klein. In 1997, the band re-recorded their original 1966 album and released it on the Collectables Records label.

In 1998, Frank Rodriguez rejoined the band on keyboards and Question Mark and the Mysterians released the new live album Do You Feel It, Baby? on Norton Records and achieved moderate sales. In 1999, the band released a new studio album, More Action, produced and recorded in New York City, with the album design by Michael Calleia at Industrial Strength Design. This design caused controversy as it was not approved by Question Mark prior to the release. Coinciding with the album release, Question Mark dissolved his business relationship with Weiss, allegedly due to dissatisfaction with the record and other business issues.

=== Collaborations ===
In 2000, Question Mark began a collaboration with New York guitarist and rock promoter Gary Fury. This collaboration led to a series of live concerts featuring Question Mark with a backing band led by Fury, featuring musicians from other garage bands in the New York area. The first backing band lineup included Jim "Royale" Baglino of The Casino Royales and later Monster Magnet on bass, Sam Steinig of the Philadelphia band Mondo Topless on keyboards and original Mysterians drummer Robert Martinez. The new group billed itself as Question Mark and the Mysterymen and played the Limelight in New York and the Black Cat in Washington, D.C.

In 2002, Question Mark returned to New York to headline a two-night garage rock festival at the CBGB club. The lineup included Question Mark, Fury, Robert Martinez, Keith Hartel on bass and former Pat Benatar/David Johansen band and current E Street Band keyboardist Charlie Giordano. This new band was billed as Question Mark and the New Mysterians. The new band created a multi-track recording in CBGB's studio, which is still unreleased.

On January 10, 2007, a fire destroyed Question Mark's house in Clio, Michigan, destroying all of his memorabilia and killing the Yorkshire Terrier dogs he was breeding as his business. To help Question Mark, his friends held several benefit shows for him, with Question Mark and the Mysterians performing at some of these events. In May 2007, he and Gary Fury played a benefit show at New York's Highline Ballroom. The backup group, known as the Playthings, featured Fury on guitar, Jim Baglino on bass, Jimi Black of Cheetah Chrome and Sylvain Sylvain on drums, and Brian Leonard on keyboards.

Guitarist Dennis Dean Lack joined the band in 1985, and was Question Mark's main guitarist and music director, and still collaborates on new songs with Question Mark into 2017. Lack has been active in the band off and on for over 30 years; he now resides in Northern Michigan.

=== The originals ===
In between these shows, Question Mark was still occasionally active with the original Mysterians. In 2001, Question Mark and the original Mysterians returned to New York City to play guitarist Steven Van Zandt's Underground Garage live event, selling out the Village Underground venue.

In 2006, the original members of ? and the Mysterians were inducted into the Michigan Rock and Roll Legends Hall of Fame.

=== Influence ===
Many 1960s garage bands played "96 Tears" in their live performances. Cover versions of "96 Tears" have been recorded by a number of bands and musicians, including Big Maybelle, Aretha Franklin, Thelma Houston, Todd Rundgren, Iggy Pop, Texas Tornados, Eddie and the Hot Rods, Inspiral Carpets, the Stranglers, and Garland Jeffreys. Cerebral serial comedy host Stuart Mclean on the CBC Radio mentioned the band as the butt of a practical joke played by central character Dave in an episode of The Vinyl Cafe.

=== In the 2010s ===
Former Mysterians drummer Eddie Serrato (born Eduardo Serrato, December 5, 1945) died from a heart attack on February 24, 2011, aged 65. Lead guitarist Robert Balderrama was diagnosed with prostate cancer in October 2017.

=== In the 2020s ===
All five members played a show on November 11, 2023, at the Brooklyn Detroit venue in the Corktown neighborhood of Detroit.

== Discography ==
=== Studio albums ===
Year	Album details	Billboard 200
1966	96 Tears: Released: November 1966; Label: Cameo-Parkway Records (C-2004); Format: LP	66
1967	Action: Released: June 1967; Label: Cameo-Parkway Records (C-2006); Format: LP	—
1997	Question Mark & the Mysterians: Released: November 4, 1997; Label: Collectables Records (COL-2004); Formats: CD, LP	—
1999	More Action: Released: May 25, 1999; Label: Cavestomp! Records (CS! 5002-2); Format: CD	—
"—" denotes a release that did not chart.

=== Live albums ===
Year	Album details
1985	The Dallas Reunion Tapes – 96 Tears Forever: Released: 1985; Label: ROIR (A-137); Formats: Cassette, CD, LP
1998	Do You Feel It Baby?: Released: April 28, 1998; Label: Norton Records (CED-262); Formats: CD, LP

=== Compilation albums ===
Year	Album details
2001	Feel It! The Very Best of ? & the Mysterians: Released: July 31, 2001; Labels: Cavestomp! Records, Varese Sarabande (302 066 263 2); Format: CD
2005	The Best of ? and the Mysterians – Cameo Parkway 1966–1967: Released: October 18, 2005; Labels: Cameo-Parkway, ABKCO, (001877192322); Format: CD
2015	Are You For Real?: Released: January 20, 2015; Label: RockBeat Records (ROC-CD-3290); Format: CD
2020	We Are Not Alone: Rarities 1968-1970: Released: October 9, 2020; Labels: Pyramidion Music Group; Format: Digital

=== Singles ===
Release date	Title	Peak chart positions			Record Label	B-side	Album
Release date	Title	US	CA	UK	Record Label	B-side	Album
1966	"96 Tears"	–	–	–	Pa-Go-Go Records (45-102)	"Midnight Hour"	Non-album tracks
August 1966	"96 Tears" (re-release)	1	1	37	Cameo (C-428)	"Midnight Hour"	96 Tears
November 1966	"I Need Somebody"	22	14	–	Cameo (C-441)	""8" Teen"	96 Tears
March 1967	"Can't Get Enough of You Baby"	56	38	–	Cameo (C-467)	"Smokes"	Action
April 1967	"Beachcomber" (as The Semi-Colons?)	–	–	–	Cameo (C-468)	"Set Aside"	Non-album tracks
May 1967	"Girl (You Captivate Me)"	98	–	–	Cameo (C-479)	"Got To"	Action
August 1967	"Do Something to Me"	110	–	–	Cameo (C-496)	"Love Me Baby (Cherry July)"	Non-album tracks
April 1968	"Make You Mine"	–	–	–	Capitol (2162)	"I Love You Baby"	Non-album tracks
January 1969	"Sha La La"	–	–	–	Super K (SK 102)	"Hang In"	Non-album tracks
February 1969	"Ain't It a Shame"	–	–	–	Tangerine (TRC 989X)	"Turn Around Baby (Don't Ever Look Back)"	Non-album tracks
September 1970	"Talk Is Cheap"	–	–	–	Chicory (CH-410)	"She Goes to Church on Sunday"	Non-album tracks
1973	"Hot 'n Groovin'"	–	–	–	Luv (GM 159)	"Funky Lady"	Non-album tracks
1998	"Sally Go Round the Roses"	–	–	–	Norton (96)	"It's Not Easy"	More Action
1999	"Are You For Real"	–	–	–	Norton (45-083)	"I'll Be Back"	More Action
2012	"Doncha Want My Love" "Hot 'N' Groovin'"	–	–	–	Luv (NTI 45 0701)	"Funky Lady"	Non-album tracks
"—" denotes a release that did not chart.
