= Vatican Commandos =

American hardcore punk band

- Origin: Darien, Connecticut
- Genres: Hardcore punk
- Years active: 1982–1985, 2010–2011
- Members: James Spadaccini; John Farnsworth; Lindsey Anderson; Chip Moody; Richard "Moby" Hall; Chuck Weaver; Dave Hower; Mike Pollock

Vatican Commandos were an American hardcore punk band formed in Darien, Connecticut.

The band features members James Spadaccini, John Farnsworth, Lindsey Anderson, Chip Moody, Chuck "Wheat" Weaver, and Richard Hall (who went on to success under the name Moby after the VC disbanded). The band was formed in 1982 and released its first 7-inch EP entitled Hit Squad for God in 1983. Richard Hall (Moby) is credited as "M.H." on the back cover of the release. Later members included Dave Hower, Mike Pollock, and Matt Craig. The band went on to release the Just a Frisbee 7-inch EP later in 1983 and Point Me to the End 12-inch EP in 1984. The lineup for Just a Frisbee, "Point me to the End," and the tour in between those two EPs was Chuck Wheat (vocals), Dave Hower (drums), Jim Spadaccini (bass), and Mike Pollock, who replaced M.H. as guitarist. The Just a Frisbee 7-inch cover artwork was drawn by Rob Zombie, founder and lead singer of White Zombie. The Vatican Commandos disbanded in 1985.

After 25 years, the band has reformed and played a reunion show July 17, 2010, at the Mercury Lounge in New York City with Up Front, Our Gang, Ed Gein's Car, and Loud Youth. The VCs played a West Coast reunion show on February 5, 2011, at The Dragonfly in Hollywood, California, with D.I.

== Discography ==
- First Strike Compilation tape, BCT(1983)
- Hit Squad for God 7-inch EP (1983)
- Just a Frisbee 7-inch EP (1983)
- Point Me to the End 12-inch EP (1984)
- Connecticut Fun Compilation LP (1985)
- Make It Work Compilation 7-inch (1985)
- Big City's One Big Crowd Compilation LP (1985)
- Hit Squad for God 7-inch EP Reissue Radiation Records(2022)
- Just a Frisbee 7-inch EP Reissue Radiation Records(2022)
- Point Me to the End 12-inch EP Reissue Radiation Records(2023)
- Full Discography 1983-2015 CD Radiation Records(2023)

== External Sources ==
- 80s Interview in "Desorden Social" zine; Tijuana, Mexico
