= Go Down Records =

Italian record label

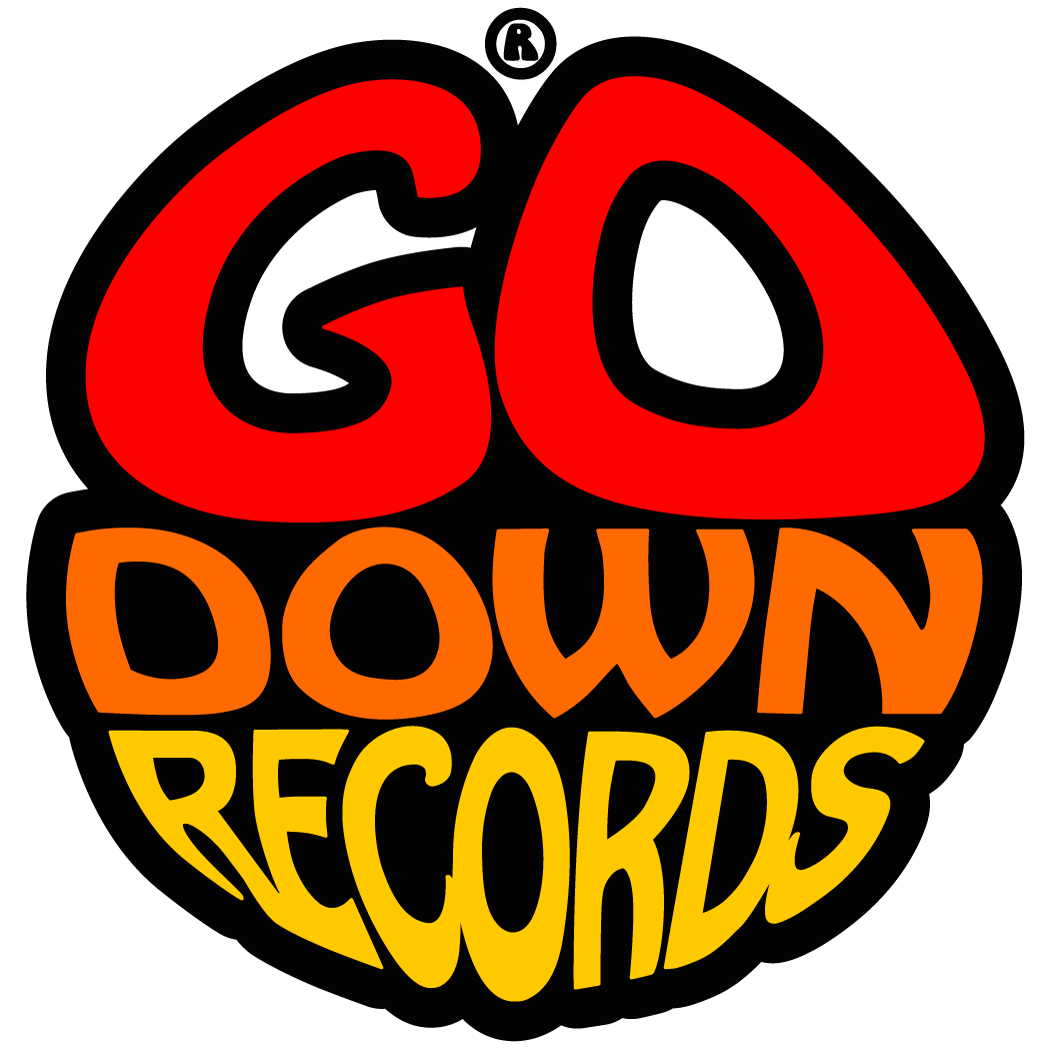
- Go Down Records Logo
- Founded: 2003
- Founder: Leonardo Cola; Max Ear
- Status: Active
- Distributor: Goodfellas
- Genre: Rochedelic
- Country of origin: Italy
- Location: Savignano Sul Rubicone
- Official website: www.godownrecords.com

Go Down Records is an independent record label based in Savignano sul Rubicone, Italy. It was founded by Leonardo Cola and Max Ear, also part of the Italian band OJM.

== History ==
Go Down Records started its activity in 2003. Its first release was Play at High Level, by the Italian band Small Jackets in 2004, followed by The Light Album, by the Italian band OJM. After that the record label started growing, involving more bands of the independent music scene such as ALiX, Veracrash, Deadpeach.

Since the beginning of its activity, the goal of the label was to support the independent music scene and in particular stoner rock, garage rock, rock'n'roll music genres.

Go Down Records is now one of the most important Italian and international record label for this kind of music. Since 2003 it has released more than eighty albums and singles by several artists: Karma To Burn, Vibravoid, Fatso Jetson, OJM, The Fuzztones, The Morlocks, Link Protrudi and the Jaymen, Solrize, Dome La Muerte and the Diggers, Rock'n’Roll Kamikazes, The Hormonauts, Small Jackets, Gunash feat. Rami Jaffee.

Go Down Records, inspired from the sounds of the 1960s and 1970s, doesn't produce only digital music but supports old formats such as vinyl.

In 2011, during the opening of Go Down Recording Studio, a professional recording studio based in Savignano Sul Rubicone, Lello Marcello Piastra and Epi Alfredo Gentili became part of the work team.

== Artists ==
List of Go Down Record's bands:

- Alice Tambourine Lover
- ALiX
- Bleeding Eyes
- Bones & Comfort
- Clepsydra
- Cut
- Deadpeach
- Dome La Muerte and the Diggers
- Douge
- El Thule
- Elbow Strike
- Electric 69
- Elepharmers
- Frigidaire Tango
- Glincolti
- Gorilla
- Grand Sound Heroes
- Gunash feat. Rami Jaffee
- Horrible Porno Stuntmen
- Humulus
- Jack La Motta And Your Bones
- Jahbulong
- Kani
- Last Killers
- Les Bondage
- Link Protrudi & The Jaymen
- Lord Shani
- Los Fuocos
- Lu Silver & String Band (ex Small Jackets)
- Mad Penguins
- Maya Mountains
- Muffx
- Muzzled
- Not Moving
- OJM
- Pater Nembrot
- Poison Deluxe
- Re Dinamite
- Slick Steve and the Gangsters
- Small Jackets
- Solrize
- Supertempo
- T.H.U.M.B.
- The Astrophonix
- The Barbacans
- The Brain Washing Machine
- The Clamps
- The Fuzztones
- The Hormonauts
- The Morlocks
- The Rock'n'roll Kamikazes
- The Sade
- The Shoes
- The Strange Flowers
- The Vindicators
- Three Eyes Left
- Underdogs
- Veracrash
- Vibravoid
- Vic Du Montes's Persona Non Grata
- Volcano Heat
- Yawning Man

Distribution Shop:

- 3 Mexicans From Gorma
- Autumn's Rain
- Belfast
- Black Dago
- Bodyntime
- Bones & Comfort
- D.O.A.
- Fango
- Fuck Knights
- Herbamate
- Hormonas
- I Ciuffis
- King Howl Quartet
- King Size
- Los Explosivos
- Love In Elevator
- Loveland
- Manta Rays
- Maya Galattici
- Mondo Naif
- Mr Bison
- Mr Soul
- Perro Malo
- Quiet Confusion
- Sendelica
- The Bermudas
- The Bone Machine
- The Fastback
- The Peawees
- The Vindicators
- Thee Catacombs
- Using Bridge
- Volcano Heat
- Whartey
