= Gals Panic (band) =

American ska punk band

- Gals Panic

Background information
- Origin: Austin, Texas, U.S.
- Genres: Ska-punk, pop-punk
- Years active: 1992–1997
- Label: Goopy Pyramid Records
- Spinoffs: The Playdoh Squad; Missile Command
- Members: Lance Fever; Jerm Pollet; DJ Saturn; Mark Nineteen; Steve Austin; Erik the Butcher; Cardinal Connor; Dave Keel

Gals Panic (Note: Also referred to as Gal's Panic.) was an Austin, Texas ska-punk band, formed in 1992 and active in the '90s. The band's name comes from the Kaneko arcade game of the same name. The band and their music were featured in the 1995 Steven Soderbergh movie The Underneath.

== History ==
Founding members Lance Myers and Jeremy "Jerm" Pollet met while working at a Greek restaurant, with Myers being introduced to Pollet around 1990 by a friend. Myers contributed to Pollet's humor magazine Powerball, and briefly served as an auxiliary member of Pollet's rap group Brother's Cup. Gals Panic was formed in 1992 after Pollet approached Myers with the suggestion of forming a ska band where he would be the guitarist and Myers would be the lead singer. Both lacked formal music training, with Myers having never sung before. The group was named after the Kaneko arcade game Gals Panic, where articles of clothing on women are removed upon level completion. The original lineup for Gals Panic consisted of vocalist Lance Fever (a name Myers took on), guitarist Jerm Pollet, and bassist DJ Saturn playing along to a drum machine programmed by Mark Nineteen.

The band's first performances were at the Cavity Club in Austin, Texas. They soon found the drummer Steve Austin who replaced Mark Nineteen and the drum machine in 1993. DJ Saturn quit after one year and was replaced by Erik "the Butcher" Grostic, who played with the band for six months. In 1994, the band appeared on Fallout: A Radioactive Compilation by KVRX, and the compilation Skarmageddon. Bassist Cardinal Connor joined. The band embarked on their first US tour in the summer of 1994, with Rancid, Total Chaos and the Offspring. Gals Panic songs appeared on the soundtrack for the 1995 Steven Soderbergh movie, The Underneath, in which the band also makes an appearance, playing at a nightclub. In 1995, the band self-released their debut – and only – full-length album, I Think We Need Helicopters, through Goopy Pyramid Records. The album features cover versions of "Superstar" and "We've Only Just Begun", two tracks previously recorded by The Carpenters. Nearly 10,000 copies of the album have been sold. Starting on 16 August 1995, another US tour occurred, with the band visiting 56 cities in eight weeks.

=== Dissolution ===
By 1996 the drummer was Dave Keel. In July, it was announced that Lance Fever and Cardinal Connor would play their final show with Gals Panic in August. By this point, Fever had formed the Playdoh Squad with GP bandmates Connor and Austin; they played their first show in July. Towards the end of Gals Panic, Lance Fever began working at an Austin animation company, Heart of Texas Productions. According to Fever, his departure was due to Connor leaving over personal differences with Pollet, while Pollet stated that Fever quit due to getting a job as an animator. Nevertheless, Gals Panic toured from June to October. The group amicably disbanded. Gals Panic have since played hometown reunion shows in Austin, Texas, such as in 2001, 2007, and at Emo's in 2010.

=== Post-breakup ===
The band Missile Command – similarly named after a video game – was formed by Jerm Pollet in late 1996, with him becoming its singer, in addition to being a guitarist. He was joined by bassist Rory Phillips and drummer Kelly Kusumoto. After Missile Command, Pollet formed the band the Ongoing Wow with Timothy "Speed" Levitch in 1998, had a solo musical project titled Tall, Dark, and Lonesome, and later became a member of The Total Foxes. He has performed in the ComedySportz troupe and Mr. Sinus Theater 3000, a live show that imitated Mystery Science Theater 3000. The Playdoh Squad released their first album, Mutate, in 2000. Lance Fever has worked on various music projects and films such as A Scanner Darkly, Prince of Egypt, and Space Jam, as well as his own animated projects, such as The Astronomer, The Ted Zone (which was on Super Deluxe and Adult Swim), and Boxer Story. His step-daughter is the singer Ariel Abshire. Steve Austin has performed with The Ugly Beats.

== Discography ==
- Space Race, 7" single (1993)
- Airline Security Things, cassette (1994)
- I Think We Need Helicopters, CD (1995)
- Vibration Eater, EP (2013, recorded in 1996)

Compilation appearances

- Fallout: A Radioactive Compilation (1994)
- Skarmageddon (1994)

Splits

- Gals Panic / Coolhand Band, Root Beer Records (1995)
