= Big Maybelle =

American R&B singer (1924–1972)

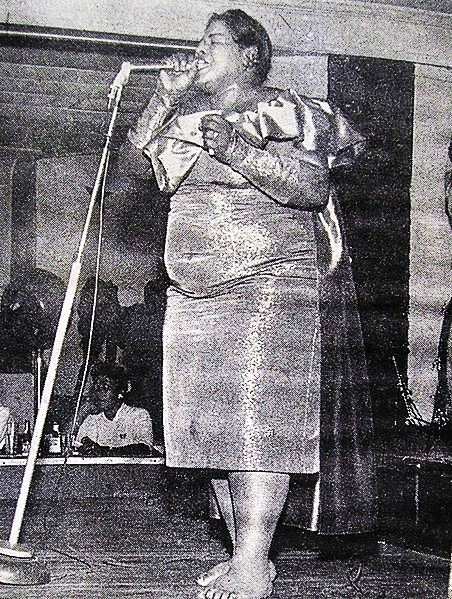

Background information
- Born: Mabel Louise Smith; May 1, 1924; Jackson, Tennessee, U.S.
- Died: January 23, 1972 (aged 47) Cleveland, Ohio, U.S.
- Genres: R&B, blues, gospel
- Occupation: Vocalist
- Years active: 1936–1972
- Labels: King Records, Okeh, Savoy, Epic, Brunswick, Scepter, Chess, Port, Rojac, Encore

Mabel Louise Smith (May 1, 1924 – January 23, 1972), known professionally as Big Maybelle, was an American R&B singer. Her 1956 hit single "Candy" received the Grammy Hall of Fame Award in 1999.

== Childhood and musical background ==
Born in Jackson, Tennessee, on May 1, 1924, Big Maybelle sang gospel as a child; by her teens, she had switched to rhythm and blues. She began her professional career with Dave Clark's Memphis Band in 1936, and also toured with the all-female International Sweethearts of Rhythm. She then joined Christine Chatman's Orchestra, and made her first recordings with Chatman in 1944, before recording with the Tiny Bradshaw's Orchestra from 1947 to 1950.

Her debut solo recordings, recorded as Mabel Smith, were for King Records in 1947.

== Okeh Records ==
In 1952, she was signed by Okeh Records, whose record producer Fred Mendelsohn gave her the stage name 'Big Maybelle' because of her loud yet well-toned voice. Her first recording for Okeh, "Gabbin' Blues", was a number 3 hit on the Billboard R&B chart, and was followed up by both "Way Back Home" and "My Country Man" in 1953.

In 1955, she recorded the song "Whole Lotta Shakin' Goin' On", produced by up-and-coming producer Quincy Jones, a full two years before rockabilly then rock and roll singer Jerry Lee Lewis's version. Lewis credited Smith's version as being the inspiration to make his version much louder, raunchy and raucous, with a driving beat and a spoken section with a come-on that was considered very risque for the time.

== Savoy Records ==
More hits followed throughout the 1950s, particularly after signing with Savoy Records later in 1955, including "Candy" (1956), one of her biggest sellers.

During this time, she also appeared on stage at the Apollo Theater in New York City in 1957, and at the 1958 Newport Jazz Festival she sang "All Night Long/I Ain't Mad at You", as seen in Bert Stern's film of the festival, Jazz on a Summer's Day, in which Mahalia Jackson and Dinah Washington also performed.

== Career decline ==
After 1959, she recorded for a variety of labels, but the hits largely dried up. She continued to perform into the early 1960s. Her last hit single was in 1967, a cover of "96 Tears" by Question Mark & the Mysterians. By the 1960s, Maybelle's heroin use began detrimentally impacting her career.

== Death ==
Smith died of a diabetic coma on January 23, 1972, in Cleveland, Ohio. She had been frequently ill during the previous 18 months. She was survived by her only child, Barbara Smith, and five grandchildren.

Her final album, Last of Big Maybelle, was released posthumously in 1973.

== Legacy ==
The album The Okeh Sessions, released on the Epic label, won the 1983 W.C. Handy Award for "Vintage or Reissue Album of the Year (U.S.)". In 2011, she was inducted to the Blues Hall of Fame.

Her version of "Whole Lotta Shakin' Goin' On" was included in the soundtrack for Fallout 4 as part of the Diamond City Radio playlist.

== Discography ==
=== Albums ===
Year	Title	Genre	Label
2016	The Complete King, OKeh & Savoy Releases 1947-61	R&B	Acrobat [UK] [2CD]
2007	I've Got a Feelin' (OKeh & Savoy Recordings 1952-56)	R&B	Rev-Ola Bandstand
2004	The Chronological Big Maybelle 1944-1953	R&B	Classics 'Blues & Rhythm'
2001	Maybelle's Blues	R&B	Sony Music Special Products
2001	Candy! (Savoy Blues Legends)	R&B	Savoy Jazz [2CD]
2001	Half Heaven, Half Heartache (The Brunswick Recordings)	R&B	Westside [UK]
1998	The Very Best of Big Maybelle "That's All"	R&B	Collectables
1995	Blues, Candy and Big Maybelle	R&B	Savoy Jazz
1994	Maybelle Sings the Blues	R&B	Charly [UK]
1994	The Complete OKeh Sessions 1952-55	R&B	Epic/Legacy EK-53417
1983	The OKeh Sessions	R&B	Epic EG-38456 [2LP]
1973	The Last of Big Maybelle	R&B	Paramount PAS-1011
1969	Saga of the Good Life and Hard Times	R&B	Rojac 123
1968	The Gospel Soul of Big Maybelle	Gospel	Brunswick BL-754142
1968	"Gabbin' Blues" and Other Big Hits	R&B	Encore EE-22012
1967	Got a Brand New Bag	R&B	Rojac 122
1965	The Soul of Big Maybelle	R&B	Scepter 522
1962	What More Can a Woman Do?	R&B	Brunswick BL-754107
1959	The Blues: Mamie Webster Sings W.C.Handy	R&B	Cub (MGM) 8002
1958	Blues, Candy and Big Maybelle	R&B	Savoy MG-14011
1958	Big Maybelle Sings	R&B	Savoy MG-14005
1954	Big Maybelle	R&B	Epic EG-7071

=== Singles ===
Year	Single (A-side, B-side) Both tracks from same album except where indicated	Chart Positions		Album
Year	Single (A-side, B-side) Both tracks from same album except where indicated	US Pop	US R&B	Album
1948	"Sad and Disappointed Jill" b/w "Bad Dream Blues"	-	-	Non-album tracks
1948	"Indian Giver" b/w "Too Tight Mama"	-	-	Non-album tracks
The above two records as shown as by Mabel Smith
1953	"Gabbin' Blues" b/w "Rain Down Rain"	-	3	"Gabbin' Blues" and Other Big Hits
1953	"Way Back Home" b/w "Just Want Your Love"	-	10	"Gabbin' Blues" and Other Big Hits
1953	"Send for Me" b/w "Jinny Mule" (from "Gabbin' Blues" and Other Big Hits)	-	-	Non-album track
1953	"My Country Man" b/w "Maybelle's Blues"	-	5	"Gabbin' Blues" and Other Big Hits
1954	"You'll Never Know" b/w "I've Got a Feelin'"	-	-	"Gabbin' Blues" and Other Big Hits
1954	"I'm Getting 'Long Alright" b/w "My Big Mistake"	-	-	"Gabbin' Blues" and Other Big Hits
1955	"Don't Leave Poor Me" b/w "Ain't No Use" (Non-album track)	-	-	"Gabbin' Blues" and Other Big Hits
1955	"Whole Lotta Shakin' Goin' On" b/w "One Monkey Don't Stop No Show" (from "Gabbin' Blues" and Other Big Hits)	-	-	Non-album tracks
1956	"Such a Cutie" b/w "The Other Night"	-	-	Non-album tracks
1956	"Candy" b/w "That's a Pretty Good Love"	-	11	Blues, Candy & Big Maybelle
1956	"Mean to Me" b/w "Tell Me Who"	-	-	Blues, Candy & Big Maybelle
1956	"New Kind of Mambo" b/w "Gabbin' Blues" (from "Gabbin' Blues" and Other Big Hits)	-	-	Non-album tracks
1957	"I Don't Want to Cry" b/w "All of Me"	-	-	Big Maybelle Sings
1957	"Rock House" b/w "Jim"	-	-	Big Maybelle Sings
1957	"Silent Night" b/w "White Christmas"	-	-	Non-album tracks
1957	"So Long" b/w "Ring Dang Dilly"	-	-	Blues, Candy & Big Maybelle
1958	"Blues, Early Blues"—Part 1 b/w Part 2	-	-	Blues, Candy & Big Maybelle
1959	"Baby Won't You Please Come Home" b/w "Say It Isn't So"	-	-	Big Maybelle Sings
1959	"A Good Man Is Hard to Find" b/w "Pitiful" (from Blues, Candy & Big Maybelle)	-	-	Non-album tracks
1959	"I Understand" b/w "Some of These Days"	-	-	Non-album tracks
1960	"I Got It Bad and That Ain't Good" b/w "Until the Real Thing Comes Along"	-	-	Non-album tracks
1961	"Going Home Baby" b/w "I Ain't Got Nobody"	-	-	Non-album tracks
1962	"Candy" b/w "Cry"	-	-	What More Can a Woman Do
1963	"Cold Cold Heart" b/w "Why Was I Born" (from What More Can a Woman Do)	-	-	The Last of Big Maybelle
1963	"How Deep Is the Ocean" b/w "Everybody's Got a Home But Me"	-	-	What More Can a Woman Do
1964	"Oh Lord, What Are You Doing to Me" b/w "Same Old Story"	-	-	The Soul of Big Maybelle
1964	"My Mother's Eyes" b/w "Careless Love"	-	-	Saga of the Good Life & Hard Times
1964	"I Don't Want to Cry" b/w "Yesterday's Kisses"	-	-	Non-album tracks
1965	"Let Me Go" b/w "No Better for You" (from The Last of Big Maybelle)	-	-	Non-album tracks
1966	"It's a Man's Man's World" b/w "Maybelle Sings the Blues" (from Saga of the Good Life and Hard Times)	-	-	Non-album tracks
1966	"Don't Pass Me By" b/w "It's Been Raining" (from Saga of the Good Life & Hard Times)	-	27	Non-album tracks
1967	"96 Tears" b/w "That's Life"	96	23	Got a Brand New Bag
1967	"Turn the World Around the Other Way" b/w "I Can't Wait Any Longer" (Non-album track)	-	-	Got a Brand New Bag
1967	"Mama (He Treats Your Daughter Mean)" b/w "Keep That Man"	-	-	Non-album tracks
1968	"Quittin' Time" b/w "I Can't Wait Any Longer"	-	-	Non-album tracks
1968	"Heaven Will Welcome You, Dr. King" b/w "Eleanor Rigby" (from Got a Brand New Bag)	-	-	Non-album tracks
1968	"Do Lord" b/w "Nobody Knows the Trouble I've Seen"	-	-	The Gospel Soul of Big Maybelle
1969	"Old Love Never Dies" b/w "How It Lies"	-	-	Saga of the Good Life & Hard Times
1973	"Blame It on Your Love" b/w "See See Rider"	-	-	The Last of Big Maybelle

== See also ==
- List of R&B musicians
- List of East Coast blues musicians
- List of Jump blues musicians
- New York blues
