= Whatever Gets You Off =

Studio album by The Last Vegas
- Released: April 14, 2009
- Recorded: 2008–2009 at Raxx Traxx Studios, Chicago, IL
- Genre: Hard rock, glam metal, heavy metal, glam rock
- Length: 44:58
- Label: Eleven Seven Music
- Producer: Nikki Sixx; DJ Ashba; Marti Frederiksen

The Last Vegas chronology
The Last Vegas (2008)	Whatever Gets You Off (2009)	Bad Decisions (2012)

Professional ratings
Review scores
Source	Rating
Allmusic	3.5/5 stars
Sleaze Roxx	5/5 stars
Hard Rock Hideout	8.5/10 stars

Whatever Gets You Off is the major label debut by Chicago based hard rock band The Last Vegas, released on April 14, 2009, on Nikki Sixx's Eleven Seven Music label. It is the band's fourth full-length album overall.

The album was produced by Mötley Crüe and Sixx:A.M. bassist Nikki Sixx, as well as Sixx:A.M. guitarist DJ Ashba, and songwriter/producer Marti Frederiksen.

After winning a contest hosted by Guitar Center at the Whisky a Go Go in Los Angeles, the band was picked to open for Mötley Crüe, on their US winter Saints Of Los Angeles Tour with Theory of a Deadman and Hinder, as well as $20,000 in cash. Following this, the band was also offered a contract form Mötley Crüe's bassist Nikki Sixx, on his record label - Eleven Seven Music.

6 of the songs on the album: "Love Me Bad", "Whatever Gets You Off", "I'm Bad", "Apologize", "Cherry Red" and "Dirty Things You Do", were all previously featured on the 2008 self-titled album, but were re-recorded especially for this major label release.

The first single from the album was "I'm Bad" which proved to be the band's most successful single to date.

== Response ==
The album gained many positive reviews citing the band as the "next big thing in glam rock", "Awesome rock'n'roll", "Raunchy, rowdy, and ruffed-up glam rock", "Swaggering, stomping, balls-out guitar rock", "Well-swung post-garage pre-punk and/or pre-grunge long-haired dirty-white-boy riff-and-squeal hard rock" and more.
The band was also picked as Spin magazine's "Best New Discovery" at SXSW 2008.
The album also earned a 3.5 out of 5 rating in Allmusic, although being criticized for being another AC/DC worship band.

== Track listing ==
All tracks are written by The Last Vegas, except for where noted.

No.	Title	Length
1.	"Whatever Gets You Off" (The Last Vegas, Marti Frederiksen)	3:48
2.	"I'm Bad" (The Last Vegas, Frederiksen, Nikki Sixx)	3:38
3.	"High Class Trash"	3:32
4.	"Loose Lips"	4:24
5.	"Apologize" (The Last Vegas, Frederiksen, Sixx)	5:27
6.	"Cherry Red" (The Last Vegas, Frederiksen)	3:13
7.	"Another Lover"	3:58
8.	"Dirty Things You Do" (The Last Vegas, Frederiksen)	3:22
9.	"White Lies"	5:15
10.	"Love Me Bad"	5:18
11.	"Outta My Mind"	3:03
Total length:		45:03

== Personnel ==
- Chad Cherry – lead vocals
- Adam Arling – guitar
- Johnny Wator – guitar
- Danny Smash – bass
- Nate Arling – drums, percussion
