= The Adventures of Sharkboy and Lavagirl =

2005 film by Robert Rodriguez

- Theatrical release poster
- Directed by: Robert Rodriguez
- Written by: Robert Rodriguez; Marcel Rodriguez
- Story by: Racer Max Rodriguez (Note: Labeled onscreen as "Based on the stories and dreams of Racer Max".)
- Produced by: Elizabeth Avellán; Robert Rodriguez (Note: Robert Rodriguez is not credited as a producer onscreen, but is on the film's poster and DVD billing blocks.)
- Starring: Taylor Lautner; Taylor Dooley; Cayden Boyd; David Arquette; Kristin Davis; George Lopez
- Cinematography: Robert Rodriguez
- Edited by: Robert Rodriguez
- Music by: Robert Rodriguez; John Debney; Graeme Revell
- Production companies: Dimension Films; Columbia Pictures; Troublemaker Studios
- Distributed by: Dimension Films (United States and Canada); Sony Pictures Releasing International (International)
- Release dates: June 4, 2005 (Los Angeles); June 10, 2005 (United States)
- Running time: 93 minutes
- Country: United States
- Language: English
- Budget: $50 million
- Box office: $72 million

The Adventures of Sharkboy and Lavagirl (Note: Marketed as The Adventures of Sharkboy and Lavagirl in 3-D) is a 2005 American superhero film, co-written, edited, shot, and directed by Robert Rodriguez. The ensemble cast stars Taylor Lautner, Taylor Dooley, Cayden Boyd, David Arquette, Kristin Davis and George Lopez. In the film, ten-year-old Max's dreamed-up superheroes Sharkboy and Lavagirl travel to his world and take him to Planet Drool, where they must stop Mr. Electric and Minus' plan to control the planet with darkness.

Many of the concepts and much of the story were conceived by Rodriguez's children, most notably Racer Max. The film uses anaglyph 3D technology, similar to that used in Rodriguez's Spy Kids 3-D: Game Over (2003).

The Adventures of Sharkboy and Lavagirl was released in the United States on June 10, 2005, by Dimension Films, and internationally by Sony Pictures Releasing International through Columbia Pictures. It received negative reviews from critics and was a box office disappointment, grossing $72 million against a budget of $50 million. However, it has since garnered a cult following. A sequel, We Can Be Heroes, was released in 2020.

== Plot ==
Max, a lonely ten-year-old boy in suburban Austin, dreams up an imaginative world called Planet Drool, recording what he dreams about in a journal. In this realm, his many dream-born creations come to life, among them two superheroes of Drool named Sharkboy and Lavagirl. Max faces challenges in the real world, including bullying from classmate Linus and his parents' troubled marriage.

After a fight where Linus steals and vandalizes Max's dream journal, Sharkboy and Lavagirl appear in their real world classroom and invite Max to Planet Drool. Once there, they explain that Mr. Electric - the corrupt electrician of Drool based on Max's eccentric teacher Mr. Electricidad - is corrupting the dream world. Together, they embark on a journey to restore Planet Drool, facing obstacles and bonding along the way.

They confront Mr. Electric, but he traps them in the "Dream Graveyard", where forgotten dreams lie. Guided by Tobor, a robot toy Max abandoned, they plan to freeze time with the Crystal Heart, in the possession of Lavagirl's rival the Ice Princess, to freeze the contamination solid and thus repair the dream world. However, they are captured by "Minus", the mastermind commanding Mr. Electric. Minus is revealed to be Linus, who came to planet Drool using Max's dream journal, and has been causing the spread of darkness and evil with his own drawings and dreams. After escaping, the trio obtain the Crystal Heart from the Ice Princess, but Mr. Electric ambushes them again, leading to Lavagirl sacrificing herself to save Sharkboy.

Setting aside his selfish dreams, Max becomes the Daydreamer and gains reality-warping powers. After sending Sharkboy to revive Lavagirl, he defeats Linus and proposes to create a better dream world together. Linus agrees, but Mr. Electric rejects the offer, angered by Linus's redemption he flees to Earth, intending to kill Max in his sleep. Encouraged by Sharkboy and Lavagirl to save the real world, Max and Linus return there and discover Mr. Electric simulating a tornado to attack the school. As Sharkboy and Lavagirl save Max's parents from the ensuing chaos, who reconcile in the process, Max gives the Crystal Heart to his classmate Marissa, the basis for the Ice Princess, who freezes and destroys Mr. Electric.

As peace is restored, Sharkboy becomes King of the Ocean, searching for his father, and Lavagirl becomes Queen of Earth's Volcanoes. Max, reconciled with his parents and on friendly terms with Marissa and Linus, repairs Tobor and encourages everyone to "dream a better dream and work to make it real."

== Cast ==
- Cayden Boyd as Max. An imaginative 10-year-old boy, known as the "day-dreamer" on Planet Drool. "At first he's dreaming all for himself; he wants Shark Boy and Lava Girl to take him away", Boyd said about the role. "I like that he's selfish in the beginning and he's not selfish in the end".
- Taylor Lautner as Sharkboy. Lautner said about the character, "He's very self-confident and sometimes his confidence gets him into trouble. He's also kinda jealous of the character, Max, because he has an inside crush on Lavagirl and she's overly motherly to Max." Lautner's martial arts skills helped him to obtain the role of Sharkboy. "When I auditioned for the film, Robert Rodriguez, the director, didn't know that I had my martial arts [background], and while we were there in Austin, TX he saw a DVD of me and asked me to choreograph my own fight scenes", said Lautner. Lautner was the first to audition for the film, says Rodriguez, and was chosen immediately.
- Taylor Dooley as Lavagirl. This role was cast after the two other main characters, Sharkboy and Max, had already been cast. Lavagirl's lava bike was computer-generated, like many of the elements in the film; Dooley and Lautner described the on-set versions of the lava bike and Sharkboy's shark-themed jetski as "a green box with handles".
- David Arquette and Kristin Davis play Max's parents. Max's father is an unemployed writer. They are on the brink of a divorce. They mean well for Max but are unable to solve his problems. On Planet Drool, Max's parents appear as a pair of "Cookie Giants" who live happily in the Land of Milk and Cookies.
- George Lopez as Mr. Electricidad, Mr. Electric, the voice of Tobor, and the voice of the Ice King. Mr. Electricidad is Max's teacher. Mr. Electric is Planet Drool's corrupt electrician. Tobor is an unfinished robot of Max that resided in the Dream Graveyard. The Ice King is the father of the Ice Princess. Rodriguez states that he kept asking Lopez to play additional characters. Lopez spent a total of two weeks working on the film.
- Jacob Davich as Linus / Minus. He is a bully at Max's school and steals his Dream Journal. With it, he enters Max's dreamworld and, using the name "Minus" (a nickname bestowed by Mr. Electricidad for Linus's habit of disliked conduct) alters it to his version before ultimately befriending Max.
- Sasha Pieterse as Marissa Electricidad / Ice Princess. Marissa is the daughter of Mr. Electricidad, and at first, the only student who befriends Max. On Planet Drool, she appears as the Ice Princess, the ruler of the Ice Kingdom and keeper of the Crystal Heart, a necklace she wears that can freeze anything, including time.

Director Robert Rodriguez has an uncredited role voicing a shark, and his children, Rebel and Racer, portray Sharkboy at age five and age seven respectively. Rico Torres portrays Sharkboy's father. Marc Musso and Shane Graham play children at Max's school.

== Production ==
Parts of the film were shot on location in Texas from September to December 2004, where Max resides and goes to school in the film. Much of the film was shot in a studio against a green screen. Most of the ships, landscapes and other effects including some creatures and characters, were accomplished digitally. According to Taylor Lautner and Taylor Dooley, when filming the scene with the dream train, the front part of the train was an actual physical set piece. "The whole inside was there and when they have all the gadgets you can pull on, that was all there but everything else was a green screen," said Dooley. Eleven visual effects companies (Hybride Technologies, Cafe FX, The Orphanage, Post Logic, Hy*drau"lx, Industrial Light & Magic, R!ot Pictures, Tippett Studio, Amalgamated Pixels and Intelligent Creatures and Rodriguez's Texas-based Troublemaker Digital) worked on the film in order to accomplish over 1,000 visual effect shots.

Robert Rodriguez appears in the credits fourteen times, most notably as a director, a producer, a screenwriter (along with Marcel Rodriguez), a visual effects supervisor, a director of photography, an editor, a camera operator, and a composer and performer. The story is credited to Racer Max Rodriguez, with additional story elements by Rebecca Rodriguez, who also wrote the lyrics for the main song, "Sharkboy and Lavagirl". Other members of the Rodriguez family can be seen in the film or were involved in the production.

Miley Cyrus had auditioned for the film with Lautner, and said it came down to her and another girl who was also auditioning; however, Cyrus then began production on Hannah Montana, and thus the other girl, presumably Dooley, got the role.

The Adventures of Sharkboy and Lavagirl in 3D was a co-production of Dimension Films, Columbia Pictures, and Troublemaker Studios, and was distributed in the United States by Miramax Films and Dimension Films.

== Soundtrack ==
Original Motion Picture Soundtrack: The Adventures of Sharkboy and Lavagirl in 3-D

Soundtrack album by various artists
- Released: June 10, 2005
- Genres: Rock, pop
- Length: 43:26
- Label: Varèse Sarabande

Professional ratings
Review scores
Source	Rating
Filmtracks	2/5 stars
Music from the Movies	2/5 stars
SoundtrackNet	2/5 stars

Robert Rodriguez composed parts of the score himself, with contributions by composers John Debney and Graeme Revell.

No.	Title	Writer(s)	Performer(s)	Length
1.	"The Shark Boy"	Robert Rodriguez, John Debney		3:47
2.	"The Lava Girl"	Rodriguez		1:28
3.	"Max's Dream"	Rodriguez		1:37
4.	"Sharkboy and Lavagirl Return"	Rodriguez		1:44
5.	"Planet Drool"	Rodriguez		2:12
6.	"Mount Never Rest"	Graeme Revell		2:35
7.	"Passage of Time"	Rodriguez, Carl Thiel		1:30
8.	"Mr. Electric"	Revell		1:09
9.	"Train of Thought"	Debney		2:01
10.	"Dream Dream Dream Dream (Dream Dream)"	Rodriguez	Shark Boy and the Lava Girls	1:54
11.	"Stream of Consciousness"	Debney		1:33
12.	"Sea of Confusion"	Debney		3:04
13.	"The LaLa's"	Nicole Weinstein		1:09
14.	"The Ice Princess"	Rodriguez, Debney		2:51
15.	"Sharkboy vs. Mr. Electric"	Revell		0:55
16.	"Lavagirl's Sacrifice"	Rodriguez		2:10
17.	"The Light"	Rodriguez		2:21
18.	"Battle of the Dreamers"	Rodriguez		1:21
19.	"Mr. Electric on Earth"	Revell		1:15
20.	"Unplugged"	Rodriguez, Debney		1:12
21.	"The Day Dreamer"	Rodriguez, Debney		1:29
22.	"Sharkboy and Lavagirl"	Rodriguez, Rebecca Rodriguez	Ariel Abshire & The Lava Girls	4:09
Total length:				43:26

== Release ==
=== Theatrical ===
After a Hollywood red carpet premiere on June 4, 2005, in Los Angeles, the film was released theatrically on June 10, 2005. The movie was on screens for 23 weeks.

=== Home media ===
The Adventures of Sharkboy and Lavagirl was originally released on September 20, 2005, on DVD, VHS, and UMD by Buena Vista Home Entertainment (under the Dimension Home Video banner). A special anaglyph 3D DVD was released, which included 4 pairs of themed 3D glasses.

== Books ==
Around the time of the film's debut Rodriguez co-wrote a series of children's novels entitled Sharkboy and Lavagirl Adventures with acclaimed science fiction writer Chris Roberson. They include Book 1, The Day Dreamer, and Book 2, Return to Planet Drool, which announces that it will be continued in a third volume, Deep Sleep, which was never released. There was also a release of "Max's Journal" which shows more of the character's dream journal from the movie, as well as "The Illustrated Screenplay", which shows the script with concept designs, preproduction art, character sketches, and behind-the-scenes photos. They are illustrated throughout by Alex Toader, who designed characters and environments for the film and the previous Spy Kids franchise.

Jeff Jensen of Entertainment Weekly praised another book appearing around the time of the film, The Adventures of SharkBoy and LavaGirl: The Movie Storybook (by Racer Max Rodriguez and Robert Rodriguez), as a far cry from the usual movie storybook tie-in, and also praised Alex Toader's "cartoony yet detailed" illustrations.

== Reception ==
=== Box office ===
For its opening weekend, The Adventures of Sharkboy and Lavagirl in 3-D earned $12.6 million in 2,655 theaters. It was placed at number 5 at the box office, being overshadowed by Mr. & Mrs. Smith, Madagascar, Star Wars: Episode III – Revenge of the Sith, and The Longest Yard. Grossing $39.2 million in the United States and $32.8 million in other territories for a worldwide total of $72 million, since the film's total marketing budget is unknown, it is not certain if the film was a box office flop or not.

=== Critical response ===
On the review aggregator website Rotten Tomatoes, 19% of 124 critics' reviews are positive, with an average rating of 4.4/10. The website's consensus reads: "The decision to turn this kiddie fantasy into a 3-D film was a miscalculation." On Metacritic, it has a weighted average score of 38 out of 100 based on reviews from 31 critics, indicating "generally unfavorable reviews". Audiences polled by CinemaScore gave the film a grade "B+" on scale of A to F.

Roger Ebert gave the film two out of four stars and agreed with the other criticisms in which the 3-D process used was distracting and muted the colors, thus, he believes, "spoiling" much of the film and that the film would look more visually appealing when released in the home media market.

== Lawsuit ==
The Total Nonstop Action Wrestling (TNA) professional wrestler Dean Roll, who trademarked the name "Shark Boy" in 1999, sued Miramax Films on June 8, 2005, claiming that his trademark had been infringed and demanding "[any] money, profits and advantages wrongfully gained". In April 2007, the suit was settled for an undisclosed amount.

== Follow-up ==
In an interview during the 2020 Comic-Con@Home event, Rodriguez confirmed that a character in his then-upcoming film We Can Be Heroes was the youngest daughter of Sharkboy and Lavagirl who has shark powers. Taylor Dooley was confirmed to reprise her role in the film as Lavagirl, although Lautner did not reprise his role. We Can Be Heroes was released through Netflix in December 2020. In January 2021, a sequel was announced.
