= Thomas Trabacchi =

Italian actor (born 1965)

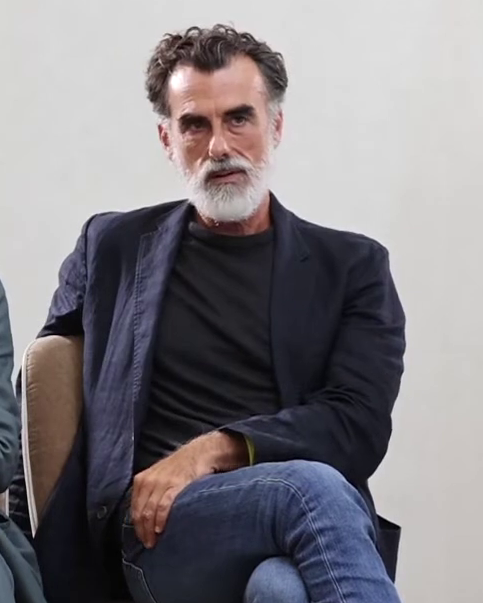
- Trabacchi in 2022
- Born: 5 September 1965 (age 60); Milan, Italy
- Occupation: Actor

Thomas Trabacchi (born 5 September 1965) is an Italian film, television, and stage actor.

== Life and career ==
Born in Milan, Trabacchi lost his father when he was 10 years old and had a troubled youth, leaving the school at 17. Following his mandatory military service, he moved to Florence, where he enrolled at the Vittorio Gassman's Bottega Teatrale ('Theater Workshop'), and then settled in Rome, where he started his professional acting career on stage and on television.

Trabacchi made his film debut in 2000, in Paul Tickell's Christie Malry's Own Double-Entry. He got his first main role one year later, in Laura Muscardin's Giorni.

In 2017, he received a Nastro d'Argento nomination for best supporting actor thanks to his performances in Francesca Comencini's Stories of Love That Cannot Belong to This World and Susanna Nicchiarelli's Nico, 1988.

=== Personal life ===
Trabacchi had a son, Luca, from film director Anna Negri. He later married actress Carlotta Natoli, with whom he had another son, Leo.

== Filmography ==
=== Films ===
Year	Title	Role(s)	Notes
2000	Christie Malry's Own Double-Entry	Trivulzio	
2001	Giorni	Claudio	
2002	Casomai	Attorney Migliori	
2002	El Alamein: The Line of Fire	Cpr. De Vita	
2003	Now or Never	Pietro	
2005	The Fever	Bicio	
2008	Aspettando il sole	Raul	
2010	Barney's Version	Leo	
2011	Boris: The Film	Fabio Carli	
2011	When the Night	Albert Sane	
2012	Piazza Fontana: The Italian Conspiracy	Marco Nozza	
2015	Uno per tutti	Saro	
2016	One Kiss	Renato	
2017	Stories of Love That Cannot Belong to This World	Flavio	
2017	Nico, 1988	Domenico Petrosino	
2018	Lucia's Grace	Guido	
2019	Un'avventura	Pietro	
2021	Baggio: The Divine Ponytail	Vittorio Petrone	
2021	Marilyn's Eyes	Paris	
2021	Yara	Chief Garro	
2022	Quattordici giorni	Lorenzo	
2023	The First Day of My Life	Zeno	
2025	Storia di una notte	Mr. Pancaldi	

=== Television ===
Year	Title	Role(s)	Notes
1997	Linda e il brigadiere	Carlo Castellini	Episode: "La turista scomparsa"
2000	Tequila & Bonetti	Nicola Sebastiano	Episode: "Cuore rapito"
2001	Don Matteo	Moreno Facciolla	Episode: "Un uomo onesto"
2002	Le ragioni del cuore	Matteo Morandi	Main role
2004	La fuga degli innocenti	Chief Ferretti	Television film
2005	Distretto di Polizia	Giuseppe	2 episodes
2006	Attacco allo Stato	Silvio	Television film
2007	Exodus - Il sogno di Ada	Enzo	Television film
2007	L'amore e la guerra	Chief Avogadro	Television film
2007	Ali Baba et les Quarante Voleurs	Malik	Television film
2007	Liberi di giocare	Beppe Guarnieri	Television film
2008	Quo Vadis, Baby?	Luca Bruni	Main role
2009–2010	Medicina generale	Dr. Elia Lorenzi	Main role (season 2)
2010	Gli ultimi del paradiso	Piero	Television film
2010	Once Upon a Time the City of Fools	Lampo	Television film
2010	Crimini	Marenghi	Episode: "Neve sporca"
2012	Il sogno del maratoneta	Ulpiano Pietri	Television film
2012	Mary of Nazareth	Joazar	Television film
2012	Mai per amore	Brandini	Episode: "Helena & Glory"
2012	Santa Barbara	Marciano	Television film
2013	Altri tempi	The Count	Television film
2014	Gli anni spezzati	Chief Bianchini	Episode: "Il commissario"
2014	Mister Ignis	Mr. Bruno	Television film
2014	La strada dritta	Minister Romiti	Television film
2015	Anti-Drug Squad	Andrea Fioranti	4 episodes
2015	1992	Attorney Arnaldi	5 episodes
2015–2018	Thou Shalt Not Kill	Giorgio Lombardi	Main role
2017	Sirene	Rodrigo Hernandez	2 episodes
2017	1993	Attorney Arnaldi	5 episodes
2017	Back Home	Michele	Main role (season 1)
2018	Trust	Doctor	Episode: "Consequences"
2018–2020	La vita promessa	Amedeo Ferri	Main role
2019	Il silenzio dell'acqua	Giovanni	Main role
2019	Liberi tutti	Riccardo	Main role
2019–2020	Baby	Tommaso Regoli	Recurring role (season 2), guest (season 3)
2020	La concessione del telefono – C'era una volta Vigata	Questor Monterchi	Television film
2020	L'Alligatore	Beniamino Rossini	Main role
2021	Questo è un uomo	Primo Levi	Documentary film
2022	Purché finisca bene	Giorgio Fontana	Episode: "Diversi come due gocce d'acqua"
2022–2024	Studio Battaglia	Alberto Casorati	Main role
2023	Django	Rosario	2 episodes
2023	Un professore	Nicola Brandi	Main role (season 2)
2024	Il re	Vittorio Mancuso	Main role (season 2)
2024	Stucky	Luca Della Torre	Episode: "Il sole di Tabriz"
