= The Last Vegas =

American hard rock band

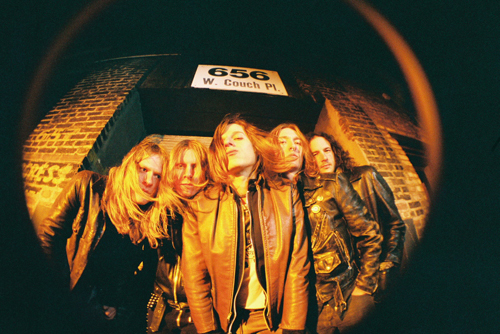
- The Last Vegas in 2005

Background information
- Origin: Chicago, Illinois U.S.
- Genres: Hard rock, glam metal
- Years active: 2003–present
- Labels: Eleven Seven, Get Hip, Scarey, Frostbyte Media
- Members: Adam Arling; Danny Smash; John Wator; Chad Cherry; Nate Arling; Bryan W. (Wilkinson)
- Website: thelastvegas.com

The Last Vegas are an American hard rock band from Chicago whose style draws from glam, punk, and sleaze metal. Composed of Chad Cherry (lead vocals), John Wator (guitar), Adam Arling (guitar), Danny Smash (bass), and Nate Arling (drums), the band released the album Whatever Gets You Off, in April 2009, on Eleven Seven Music. The album was produced by Nikki Sixx, Sixx:A.M. guitarist DJ Ashba, as well as Marti Frederiksen.

== Sound ==
The Last Vegas are a hard rock band with influences from genres including glam rock, heavy metal, and punk rock, citing influences such as Aerosmith, Guns N' Roses, Mötley Crüe, Cheap Trick, and Skid Row. They have performed all over the world since 2003.

== History ==
The Last Vegas made their recording debut with the full-length album Lick 'Em and Leave 'Em (2004) on the independent label Get Hip Records. A second full-length album, Seal the Deal (2006), followed on the same label.

After leaving Get Hip, the Last Vegas released a five-track EP High Class Trash (2007), spotlighting the song "Raw Dog" (previously released in Seal the Deal), which was featured in the popular video game Guitar Hero II (2006). The full-length, The Last Vegas (2008). In December 2008 the Last Vegas won Guitar Center's On-Stage: Your Chance to Make Rock History contest opening for Mötley Crüe. They also won $25,000 cash, $20,000 in new gear from Gibson Guitars, a management deal from 10th Street Entertainment and a recording deal from Eleven Seven Music. They beat out 8,000 contestants for the coveted prize.

In 2008, the band was also picked as Spin magazine's "Best New Discovery" at SXSW 2008.

The Last Vegas joined Mötley Crüe on their US winter Saints of Los Angeles Tour, along with Theory of a Deadman and Hinder. The band released its fourth full-length album and first major label album Whatever Gets You Off, the album was released to mainly positive reviews, produced by Mötley Crüe's Nikki Sixx, Sixx:A.M.'s DJ Ashba and frequent collaborator Marti Frederiksen, although most of the material on the album consists of the band's self-released self-titled album from 2008. The first single from the album was "I'm Bad".

With the release of the major label debut, the band toured with many bands, including Mötley Crüe, AC/DC, Guns N' Roses, Buckcherry, Papa Roach and landed headlining concerts in over 17 countries worldwide, currently touring to promote their latest album.

== Discography ==
=== Albums ===
- 2004 – Lick 'Em and Leave 'Em
- 2005 – Seal the Deal
- 2008 – The Last Vegas
- 2009 – Whatever Gets You Off
- 2012 – Bad Decisions
- 2014 – Sweet Salvation
- 2016 – Eat Me

=== EPs ===
- High Class Trash (2007)

=== Music videos ===
- "Hot Leather"
- "All the Way"
- "So Young, So Pretty, So What"
- "Ain't a Good Man"
- "Loose Lips"
- "I'm Bad"
- "Whatever Gets You Off"
- "Apologize"
- "The Other Side"
- "Evil Eyes"
- "She's My Confusion"
- "Come with Me"
- "You and Me"
- "Miss You"
- "Bloodthirsty"
