= Nico, 1988 =

2017 film by Susanna Nicchiarelli

- Theatrical release poster
- Directed by: Susanna Nicchiarelli
- Written by: Susanna Nicchiarelli
- Produced by: Marta Donzelli; Gregorio Paonessa; Joseph Rouschop; Valérie Bournonville
- Starring: Trine Dyrholm; John Gordon Sinclair; Anamaria Marinca; Sandor Funtek; Thomas Trabacchi; Karina Fernandez; Calvin Demba; Francesco Colella
- Cinematography: Crystel Fournier
- Edited by: Stefano Cravero
- Music by: Gatto Ciliegia Contro il Grande Freddo
- Production companies: Vivo Film; Rai Cinema; Tarantula
- Distributed by: I Wonder Pictures (Italy)
- Release dates: 30 August 2017 (Venice); 12 October 2017 (Italy)
- Running time: 93 minutes
- Countries: Italy; Belgium
- Language: English
- Box office: $83,558

Nico, 1988 is a 2017 biographical drama film written and directed by Susanna Nicchiarelli. A co-production between Italy and Belgium, the film chronicles the last year of the life of German singer and model Nico. It had its world premiere at the 74th Venice International Film Festival on 30 August 2017, and was released theatrically in Italy on 12 October 2017 by I Wonder Pictures.

== Plot ==
During World War II, a young Christa Päffgen watches Berlin being bombed from a distance.

In 1988, Päffgen—now known as Nico—is living in Manchester. Having risen to fame as a model and a singer for the Velvet Underground, she is tired of talking about her past and prefers to revel in her current image as a bohemian artist. She plans to embark on tour of Europe with her new manager, Richard. He assembles a band for her and they set off on the road. Nico's addiction to heroin soon proves to be a problem: she is rude to Richard, delivers abrasive performances and angrily berates her band during a concert in Italy before storming off stage. However, she forms a close friendship with Dome La Muerte who tries to focus her attention on performing. Nico confides to him that she enjoys living a life of excess having experienced hunger and poverty in the aftermath of the war.

Before a concert in Paris, Nico mentions her son Ari during an interview and explains she was too wild to have a child at the time of his birth. She goes to visit him in an institution in France where he has been placed due to a suicide attempt and drug addiction. Richard agrees to a have Nico perform a guerrilla gig in communist Czechoslovakia at the behest of local dissident artists. Before the performance, Nico becomes angry when she cannot procure heroin and accuses the hosts of stealing her passport. Richard sternly reminds her that there are people around the world who still love her music and that the Czechoslovak audience are taking a risk to see her perform. During the gig, Nico delivers a passionate performance to the delight of the crowd but the gig is brought to an abrupt halt as police raid the venue.

Nico and her band manage to escape to West Germany where they plan for Nico's final tour performance in West Berlin. Richard praises her performance and agrees to help her get clean and retrieve Ari from the institution. Things start going well for Nico and her band as she gives up drugs, but Ari attempts suicide and is placed in hospital. Nico states to Dome that she plans to retire from performing so she can grow old elegantly. Ari is released from hospital and Richard encourages him and Nico to take a long holiday to recuperate. He negotiates a new contract with Nico before she departs ensuring that she and Ari receive their share of royalties from her days with The Velvet Underground and they promise to record a new album together upon her return.

Nico travels to Ibiza for her holiday, but as revealed in the credits, she died on the island on 18 July 1988 at the age of 49 following a cycling accident.

== Cast ==
- Trine Dyrholm as Nico
- John Gordon Sinclair as Richard
- Anamaria Marinca as Sylvia
- Sandor Funtek as Ari
- Thomas Trabacchi as Domenico
- Karina Fernandez as Laura
- Calvin Demba as Alex
- Francesco Colella as Francesco

== Production ==
The film was a collaboration between the director and main actress Trine Dyrholm; they co-created the character. Dyrholm stated, "We created this version of Nico together". Dyrholm sang all the songs in the film; she restructured the music with a musician and a band. They worked into a music studio before shooting. Nicchiarelli did a lot of research and she flew to Manchester to meet Nico's manager. She also interviewed Nico's son, Ari. He read the first draft and later the final script.

The film was shot in the square format instead of rectangular format. Nicchiarelli explained, "One of the main choices was the atmosphere of the second half of the 1980s which is very interesting; it has the decadence and the quality of the VHS. They worked on the quality of the VHS and tried to reproduce that, that kind of feeling. VHS and television are square format and it forces you to stay on the characters. I think it is interesting when cinema goes back to the square. Lately, some of the best films I've seen are square".

Nicchiarelli used images of the real Nico's face and early video footage of Jonas Mekas. She wrote to him and he answered her immediately. Nicchiarelli said, "It is fun to work with archive material in fiction movies".

== Release ==
Nico, 1988 had its world premiere in the Horizons section of the 74th Venice International Film Festival on 30 August 2017. The film was released theatrically in Italy on 12 October 2017 by I Wonder Pictures. In the United States, it was released on 1 August 2018 by Magnolia Pictures.

== Reception ==
On the review aggregator website Rotten Tomatoes, the film holds an approval rating of 93% based on 76 reviews, with an average rating of 7/10. The website's critics consensus reads, "Nico, 1988 takes an absorbing – and appropriately idiosyncratic – look at the singer's later years." Metacritic, which uses a weighted average, assigned the film a score of 75 out of 100, based on 21 critics, indicating "generally favorable reviews".

Dyrholm, who played Nico, received critical acclaim for her performance. Owen Gleiberman of Variety hailed her as "a powerhouse of authenticity. Her moroseness is mesmerizing, but she also gives Nico a tense intelligence, and her singing is uncanny." Kenneth Turan of the Los Angeles Times also praised Dyrholm as "an actress of formidable presence", giving a "strong, truthful, unflinching performance that powers the film the way Christa's energy powered the bands she was in those late days". Jeannette Catsoulis of The New York Times also praised how Dyrholm was photographed in "brutally unforgiving close-up", saying that it "fully captures the faded charisma of the singer" in the last year of her existence. Joe Morgenstern of The Wall Street Journal wrote, "I've never seen a performance quite like it — unsparingly harsh, but also graceful, droll and tender, a portrait of soul-weariness laced with a yearning for salvation."

At the Venice Film Festival in 2017, it won the Orrizonti Award for Best Film. At the Donatellos in 2018, it won the Best Original Script award, and was nominated in the Best Films category. At the 9th Magritte Awards, it received a nomination in the category of Best Foreign Film in Coproduction.
