= Action (Question Mark & the Mysterians album) =

Album by Question Mark & the Mysterians

Studio album by ? and the Mysterians
- Released: June 1967
- Recorded: November 1966 – May 1967
- Studio: Allegro Sound and Dick Charles, New York City
- Genre: Garage rock
- Length: 28:00
- Label: Cameo-Parkway
- Producer: Neil Bogart, Bob Reno

? and the Mysterians chronology
96 Tears (1966)	Action (1967)	Question Mark & the Mysterians (1997)

Singles from Action
- 1. "Can't Get Enough of You Baby"/"Smokes" Released: March 1967; 2. "Girl (You Captivate Me)"/"Got To" Released: May 1967

Professional ratings
Review scores
Source	Rating
AllMusic	3.5/5 stars

Action is the second album by the American garage rock band ? and the Mysterians, released in 1967.

The album's sleeve notes include facts about the band including their interests. Much of their interests are also the inspiration for many of their songs.

== Track listing ==
All songs written and composed by Rudy Martinez except where noted.

Side one

1. "Girl (You Captivate Me)" (Alan Dischel, Joey Di Francesca) – 2:17
2. "Can't Get Enough of You Baby" (Sandy Linzer, Denny Randell) – 1:57
3. "Got To" – 2:22
4. "I'll Be Back" – 2:02
5. "Shout (Parts 1 & 2)" (Rudolph Isley, Ronald Isley, O'Kelly Isley, Jr.) – 5:31

Side two

1. "Hangin' on a String" (Gloria Shayne, Jason Darrow) – 2:15
2. "Smokes" – 1:52
3. "It's Not Easy" – 2:43
4. "Don't Hold It Against Me" (Lor Crane, Bernard Ross) – 1:57
5. "Just Like a Rose" (Jay Darrow) – 2:10
6. "Do You Feel It" – 2:25

== Personnel ==
=== ? and the Mysterians ===
- Rudy Martinez – vocals
- Bobby Balderrama – lead guitar
- Frank Lugo – bass guitar
- Frank Rodriguez – organ
- Eddie Serrato – drums

=== Technical ===
- Neil Bogart – producer
- Bob Reno – producer (Tracks 1, 3)
- Douglas Fiske – art direction

== Charts ==
Singles

Year	Single	Chart	Position
1967	"Can't Get Enough of You Baby"	Billboard Hot 100	56
1967	"Girl (You Captivate Me)"	Billboard Hot 100	98
