= Ariel Abshire =

Indie-pop singer-songwriter

- Born: Nederland, Texas, U.S.
- Origin: Austin, Texas, U.S.
- Genres: Indie pop
- Occupations: Singer, songwriter
- Instruments: Vocals, guitar
- Years active: 2002–present
- Label: Darla Records

Ariel Elizabeth Abshire is an American indie pop singer-songwriter.

== Biography ==
Abshire was born in Nederland, Texas and is from Austin, Texas. She was introduced to the Austin alternative music scene by her stepfather, Lance Fever of Gals Panic at a young age which led to her meeting Andy Sharp, who would later produce her debut album.

She has collaborated with Japancakes on the song "Cardboard", and with Matt Pond PA on the song "Love To Get Used" from his EP Spring Fools. Abshire's voice can be heard on soundtracks from Robert Rodriguez films, most notably as the lead vocals for the title track to The Adventures of Sharkboy and Lavagirl, performing as the lead vocalist for "The LavaGirls".

Signed to Darla Records, Abshire released her first studio album Exclamation Love, in 2008, and has since released two more self-penned albums, Still So New in 2011, and Unresolved in 2015. In 2019, the album 'Queen of the Boys' club' was released.
