= 96 Tears (album) =

1966 album by ? and the Mysterians

Studio album by ? and the Mysterians
- Released: November 1966
- Recorded: March–September 1966
- Studios: Cameo-Parkway, Philadelphia
- Genre: Garage rock
- Length: 29:00
- Label: Cameo-Parkway
- Producers: Neil Bogart; Rudy Martinez

? and the Mysterians chronology
96 Tears (1966)	Action (1967)

Singles from 96 Tears
- 1. "96 Tears" / "Midnight Hour" Released: August 1966; 2. "I Need Somebody" / ""8" Teen" Released: November 1966

Professional ratings
Review scores
Source	Rating
AllMusic	4.5/5 stars

96 Tears is the debut studio album by the American garage rock band ? and the Mysterians, released in 1966. It peaked at number 66 on Billboard's Pop Albums chart. The single "96 Tears" reached number 1 on the Billboard Hot 100 on October 29, prior to release of the album. The album and the single "96 Tears" were both on the charts for fifteen weeks, while the single "I Need Somebody" was on the charts for ten weeks.

First pressings had a misprinted Side 2 label listing the last track as "Tears" instead of "96 Tears". The album also incorrectly shows David Graham as composer for "Stormy Monday".

== Background ==
The band recorded the songs "96 Tears" and "Midnight Hour" on April 15, 1966, at Art Schiell's Recording Studio in Bay City, Michigan, for the small Pa-Go-Go label, which released the single in April, 1966. After getting extensive regional airplay in Michigan and Ontario, Neil Bogart, president of Cameo-Parkway Records purchased the rights to the record for national distribution. After replacing bassist Fernando Aguilar with Frank Lugo, the band went into the studio to record the remainder of the songs for their debut album released in November, 1966. The album was an immediate success and quickly shot up the charts before the end of the year. A second single, "I Need Somebody" was released in conjunction with the album.

Allen Klein and ABKCO Records acquired the Cameo-Parkway catalog in 1967, and refused to license the ? and the Mysterians records for release on CD. In July, 1997, the band reunited and rerecorded the album for the Collectables Records label. In 2011, ABKCO released the original recordings.

== Music ==
According to Loren DiBlasi of Paste Magazine: "The electric organ set ? and the Mysterians apart from their ’60s garage rock contemporaries; it gave the band a distinctive sound which was a little more punk, and a little more, well, mysterious."

== Legacy ==
According to Loren DiBlasi of Paste Magazine: "[The band's] 1966 debut 96 Tears and its now-iconic title track, a Billboard No. 1 hit single, lifted the band from underground cool to mainstream recognition. Though ? and the Mysterians are often referred to as “one-hit wonders,” the proto-punk pioneers are revered for putting an artful spin on the popular sounds of the decade."

== Track listing ==
All tracks are written by Rudy Martinez, except where noted.

Side one

1. "I Need Somebody" – 2:13
2. "Stormy Monday" (T-Bone Walker) – 2:20
3. "You're Telling Me Lies" – 2:31
4. "Ten O'Clock" – 2:03
5. "Set Aside" – 3:03
6. "Up Side" – 2:50

Side two

1. "8 Teen" – 2:45
2. "Don't Tease Me" – 1:37
3. "Don't Break This Heart of Mine" – 1:57
4. "Why Me" – 1:26
5. "Midnight Hour" – 2:36
6. "96 Tears" – 2:56

== Personnel ==
=== ? and the Mysterians ===
- Rudy Martinez – vocals
- Bobby Balderrama – lead guitar
- Frank Lugo – bass guitar
- Frank Rodriguez – organ
- Eddie Serrato – drums
- Fernando Aguilar – bass guitar (tracks 11–12)

=== Technical ===
- Neil Bogart, Rudy Martinez – producers
- Joel Fein – engineer
- Douglas Fiske – art direction
- Bob Dell – liner notes

== Charts ==
Sales chart performance for 96 Tears
Chart (1966)	Peak
Billboard	66

Sales chart performance for singles from 96 Tears
Year	Single	Chart	Position
1966	"96 Tears"	Billboard Hot 100	1
1966	"I Need Somebody"	Billboard Hot 100	22

== See also ==
- 1966 in music
