= Billboard number ones =

Billboard is an American music and entertainment magazine published weekly. The magazine provides music charts related to the music industry. Following are lists of various items that Billboard has ranked number one.

== Albums ==
- Lists of Billboard 200 number-one albums
- List of Billboard Year-End number-one singles and albums

== Artists ==
- List of artists who reached number one in the United States, artists who have reached No. 1 on Billboard's weekly singles chart(s)
- List of artists who reached number one on the U.S. alternative rock chart
- List of artists who reached number one on the U.S. dance airplay chart
- List of artists who reached number one on the U.S. Dance Club Songs chart
- List of artists who reached number one on the U.S. Hot Country chart
- List of artists who reached number one on the U.S. Mainstream Rock chart
- List of artists who reached number one on the U.S. Pop Airplay chart

== Singles ==
- Lists of Billboard number-one singles
- List of Billboard number-one alternative hits
- Timeline of Billboard number-one country songs
- List of Billboard Hot Dance/Electronic Songs number ones
- Lists of Billboard number-one rhythm and blues hits
- List of Billboard Year-End number-one singles and albums
