= Last White Christmas =

1983 music festival in Pisa, Italy

The Last White Christmas was a music festival held in Pisa, Italy on December 4, 1983. Several albums were released with recordings from the event. A 35th anniversary event was held in 2018.

== Last White Christmas ==
The Last White Christmas music festival was held in Pisa, Italy on December 4, 1983: the day of Saint Barbara. The festival, organized by the Granducato Hardcore (GDHC), was held in the deconsecrated church of San Zeno. The church hosted the first GDHC initiatives until July 1894 when the circle Victor Charlie opened.

In one of the bands that performed at festival also played Fefo Forconi then with Toxic Reasons.

== Albums ==
The recording of the concert (six hours), engineered by Alessandro Sportelli and Alessandro Paolucci via a cassette tape deck "wired directly to soundboard, no ambience mics" (Alessandro Sportelli interview), was later released by Bad Compilation Tapes / Borderless Countries Tapes of San Diego February 1984, in two volumes titled BCT #6 Last White Christmas I and BCT #7 Last White Christmas II as a co-release with Cessophonya Records of Jim Plumbago in Italy. About half the tracks were used. These two live albums were later reissued on CD in 2000 by BCT (Bad Compilation Tapes) in conjunction with Schizophrenic Records of Hamilton (Ontario, CA), Enterruption of San Francisco (California, U.S.), Ponk-111 of Walnut Creek (California, U.S.) and Human Stench of Pittsfield (Massachusetts, U.S.) with a few extra tracks. Limited edition: 500 pressed each.

Last White Christmas tracks

Some record productions made with recordings taken from Last White Christmas vol.I and vol.II:

1. Raw Power (tape, BCT, USA, 1984)
2. Senza Tregua (tape, Ribelli Uniti Records, ITA, 1984)
3. Last White Christmas (cd, Bad Compilation Tapes, Schizophrenic Records and Human Stench, USA & Canada, 2000)
4. Last White Christmas II (cd, Bad Compilation Tapes, Schizophrenic Records and Human Stench, USA & Canada, 2000)
5. Senza Tregua: Granducato Hardcore (LP, Enterruption, BC Tapes & Records, Schizophrenic Records and Ponk-111, USA, 2002)
6. Urla Dal Granducato Vol. 1 (LP, Area Pirata, ITA, 2003)
7. Urla Dal Granducato Vol. 2 (LP, Area Pirata, ITA, 2006)
8. Last White XMas (double CD, Area Pirata, ITA, 2020)
9. Urla Dal Granducato Vol. 3 (LP, Area Pirata, ITA, 2023)

=== Reception ===
A must for the international collector.

— Tim Yohannan

== Legacy ==
Ten tracks taken from the recording of the concert were published on the album Urla dal Granducato by Area Pirata Records in 2003.

In December 2018, the 35th anniversary of Last White Christmas was celebrated with the LWC35 concert in the historic Lumiere cinema of Pisa, the first cinema to be opened in Italy (1899). Among the guests of concert were polemica of Hilary Blinder, ex drummer of Sabot. In the cinema hall, there was an exhibition of 35 posters made by Italian and international graphic designers and illustrators for the 35th anniversary of the concert. Among the artists who participated with their own work created for the 35th anniversary of the concert there were: Winston Smith, Craig Henning, John Yarbrough (designer of the cover of the first concert release on cassettes), Tuono Pettinato, Vittore Baroni, Giuseppe Palumbo and Prof.Bad Trip.

In June 2020, the Italian label Area Pirata re-released the Last White Christmas concert thanks to the granting of the reprint rights free of charge by Chris Chacon of BCT.

== Bibliography ==
- Polvani, Fabio (2003). Blow-up Magazine #60.
- Philopat, Marco (2006). Lumi di punk. La scena italiana raccontata dai protagonisti. Agenzia X, Milano, Italia. ISBN 978-8895029085.
- Calmbach, Marc (2007). More than Music: Einblicke in die Jugendkultur Hardcore. [transcript], Bielefeld, Germany. ISBN 978-3899427042.
- Nozza, Diego (2011). Hard core. Introduzione al punk italiano degli anni Ottanta. CRAC Edizioni, Italia. ISBN 978-889-7389026.
- Bestley, Russ; Ogg, Alex; Loren, Dennis (2012). The Art of Punk: The Illustrated History of Punk Rock Design. Minneapolis, Minnesota: Voyageur Press. ISBN 978-0760344101.
- Bestley, Russ; Ogg, Alex; Loren, Dennis (2014). The Art of Punk: The Illustrated History of Punk Rock Design. Omnibus Press. ISBN 978-1783057368.
- Cecchi, Antonio (2016). No more pain. Viaggio nell'anima. Ed. Area Pirata Records, Pisa, Italia. ISBN 978-889-4207606.
- Greene Jr., James (2017). Brave Punk World: The International Rock Underground from Alerta Roja to Z-Off. Rowman & Littlefield. ISBN 978-1442269842.
- Senesi, Giorgio (2019). Dritti contro un muro. L'hardcore punk italiano degli anni '80 raccontato da 140 protagonisti. Feltrinelli. ISBN 979-1220047739.
