= The Cynics =

American garage rock band

- Origin: Pittsburgh, Pennsylvania, U.S.
- Genre: Garage rock
- Years active: 1983–1994; 2002–present
- Label: Get Hip Records
- Members: Gregg Kostelich; Michael Kastelic
- Past members: Becky Smith; Bill von Hagen; Amy Mathesius; Max Terasauro; Pam Reyner; Steve Magee; Kris Kasperowski; Mike Kolesar; Mike Quinlan; Mark Keresmann; Mike Michalski; Dave Vucenich; Richard Schnapp; Smith Hutchings; Thomas Hohn

The Cynics are an American garage rock band from Pittsburgh, Pennsylvania. The band, at the time consisting of guitarist Gregg Kostelich, drummer Bill Von Hagen, vocalist Michael Kastelic who joined in 1985, bass player Steve Magee, and keyboardist Becky Smith (later founder of New York City's Bellwether gallery), debuted with their first album, Blue Train Station in 1986. Many of their songs "carry the torch" for other favorite bands as cover songs or tributes. They underwent a number of lineup changes culminating in 1989's Rock and Roll album. They formed their own independent record label called Get Hip Records in 1986.

They suffered an eight-year break up after the release of Get Our Way but returned in 2002 with the release of Living Is the Best Revenge. The release of their 2007 album Here We Are was accompanied with a European tour.

The band's sound is influenced by 1960s garage rock.

== Members ==
- Gregg Kostelich - Guitar (1983–1994; 2002–present)
- Michael Kastelic - Lead vocals, percussion (1985–1994; 2002–present)
- Pablo González "Pibli" - Drums (2008–present)
- Angel Kaplan - Bass guitar (2008–present)

=== Past members ===
- Mark Keresmann - Lead vocals (1983-1985)
- Becky Smith - Keyboard (1986–1988)
- Bill von Hagen - Drums (1983–1987, 1988)
- Mike Kolesar - Drums (1987–1988, 1988–1989)
- Mike Quinlan - Drums (1988, 1991)
- Amy Mathesius - Bass (1985–1986)
- Max Terasauro - Drums (1993–1994)
- Pam Reyner - Bass (1983–1984)
- Steve Magee - Bass (1986–1990)
- Kris Kasperowski - Bass (1990–1992)
- Mike Michalski - Bass (1992–1994)
- Dave Vucenich - Bass, backing vocals (1993–1994)
- Richard Schnapp - Guitar (1985)
- Smith Hutchings - Bass (2002)
- Thomas Hohn - Drums (1989–1991; 2002)
- Jack "Jackie Robin" Schmitt - Drums (1991 European tour) (2004-2005)

== Discography ==
=== Albums ===
- Blue Train Station (1986)
- Twelve Flights Up (1988) - reissue as Sixteen Flights Up (2000)
- Rock 'n' Roll (1989)
- Learn to Lose (1993)
- Get Our Way (1994)
- Living is the Best Revenge (2002)
- Here We Are (2007)
- Spinning Wheel Motel (2011)

=== Singles ===
- Painted My Heart/Sweet Young Thing (1984)
- No Place to Hide/Hard Times (1985)
- Lying All The Time/Summer's Gone (1986)
- '69/Friday Night (1986 - Fan Club)
- No Way/Dancing On The Walls (1987)
- I'm In Pittsburgh and It's Raining/Smoke Rings (1988 - Fan Club)
- I Don't Need You/Girl, You're On My Mind (1990)
- Buick Mackane/Born to Lose (1991)
- Right Here With You/Learn to Lose (1992)
- I Live Alone/Hand In Hand (1993)

=== Live ===
- No Siesta Tonight (Live in Madrid) (1994)

== Reception ==
Scott Mervis of the Pittsburgh Post-Gazette said "Here We Are might be best of the Cynics' seven records, and USA Today has already called it "one of the best neo-garage-rock albums in years." Entertainment Weekly called them "gnarly, sweaty, raucous, and brimming with snotty attitude". In reference to the band's first two albums, Blue Train Station and Twelve Flights Up, Trouser Press said they were packed with "surefooted atmosphere and excitement".
