= Get Hip Records =

American independent music label

Get Hip Records is an independent Pittsburgh-based music label and distributor formed by Gregg Kostelich in 1986. Kostelich used the label to release music by his own band, the Cynics, as well as other local, indie and retro garage rock bands.

== Releases ==
Get Hip has released material by:

- Nox Boys
- Zack Keim
- Mystic Eyes
- Donovan's Brain
- Freddy & the Four-Gone Conclusions
- Fantastic Dee-Jays
- Gals Panic
- Gore Gore Girls
- Man or Astro-man?
- Mondo Topless
- New Bomb Turks
- Surf Trio
- The Beat
- The Black Hollies
- Big Chief
- The Irving Klaws
- The Cellar Dwellers
- The Headcoatees
- The Heretics
- The Cynics
- The Misanthropes
- Deep Reduction
- The Fleshtones
- The Gories
- The Last Vegas
- The Miracle Workers
- Mod Fun
- The Paybacks
- The Stems
- The Stump Wizards
- The Ugly Beats
- Turbonegro
- Frantic Flattops
- The Priests
- The Mount McKinleys
- Pow Wows
- The Jigsaw Seen
