= The Ugly Beats =

American garage rock band

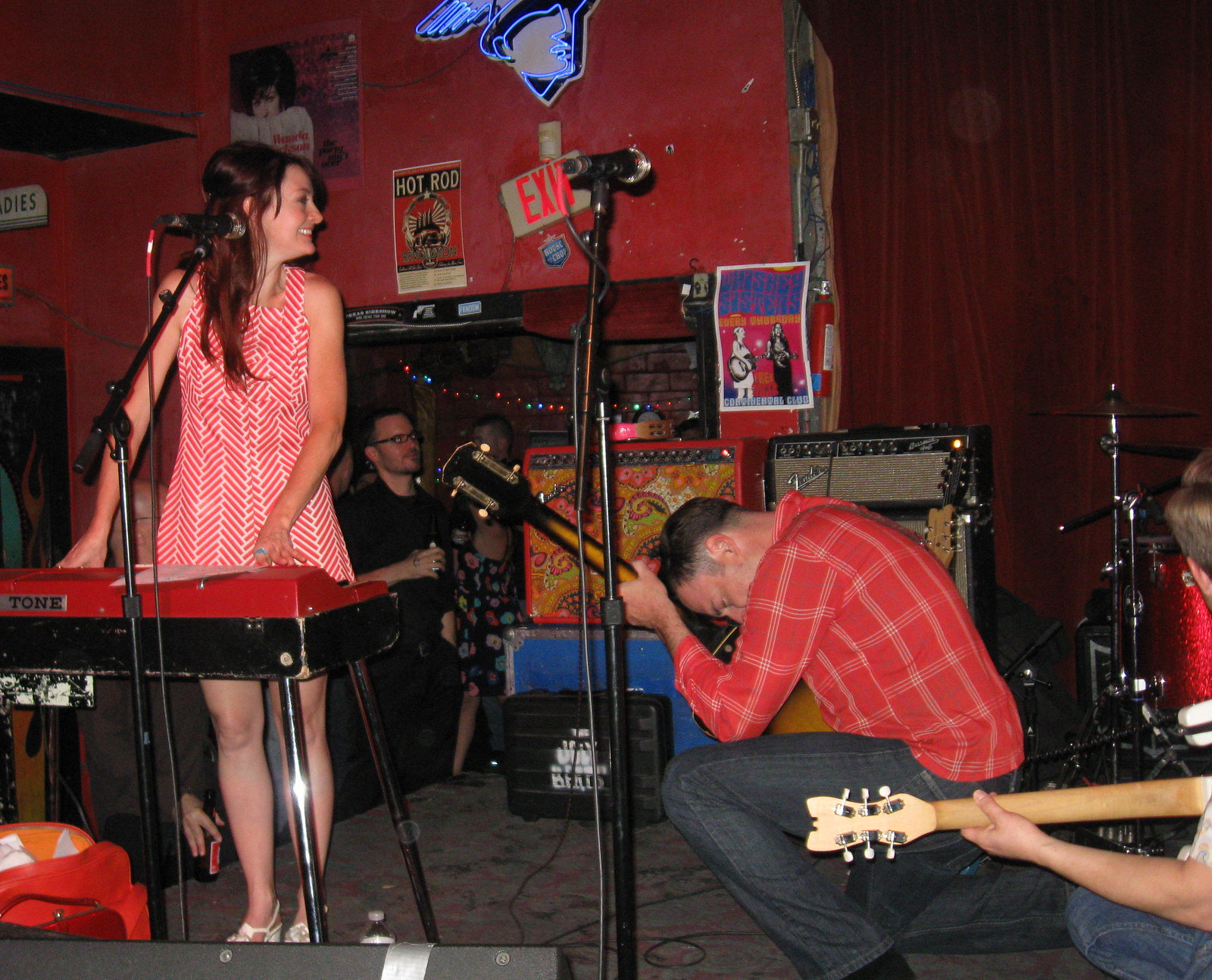

Background information
- Origin: Austin, Texas
- Genres: Garage rock, pop
- Years active: 2003–present
- Labels: Get Hip Records
- Members: Bobby Trimble; Daniel Wilcox; Jason Gentry; Jeanine Attaway; Joe Emery
- Past members: Jake Garcia; Steve Austin
- Website: http://www.theuglybeats.com/

The Ugly Beats is a garage rock band from Austin, Texas.

Born in 2003 from the remnants of Austin's Sir Finks, their first album Bring On The Beats! appeared in 2004, with a 1960s sound recalling pieces of the Kinks and the Who, as well elements of the Easybeats.

Their following albums continue the combination of the garage sounds with influences from the 60s. Diego RJ nicknamed them "the 60's Ramones".

== Members ==
Current

- Bobby Trimble - Drums
- Daniel Wilcox - Guitar
- Jason Gentry - Bass guitar
- Jeanine Attaway - Keyboards, vocals
- Joe Emery - Guitar, vocals

Former

- Jake Garcia - Guitar
- Steve Austin - Drums

== Discography ==
The Ugly Beats has released five albums and various singles:

Albums

- Bring On the Beats! (Get Hip Records GH-1126, 2004)
- Take a Stand with the Ugly Beats (Get Hip Records GH-1140, 2007)
- Motor! (Get Hip Records GH-1156, 2010)
- Brand New Day (Get Hip Records GH-1170, 2014)
- Stars Align (Get Hip Records GH-1185, 2019)

Singles

- "Can't Cut Through" / "Options by the Pound" (Get Hip Records GH-238, 2008)
- "Bee Line" / "Maximum Bumble" (Hillsdale Records, 2011)
- "Throw Me a Line" / "Sombras" (Hey Girl! Records HGR-500-12/11, 2011)

Compilations

- V/A ...Shakin' in My Boots (Licorice Tree Records, 2004)
