= Bad Decisions (The Last Vegas album) =

Studio album by The Last Vegas
- Released: August 28, 2012
- Recorded: 2011–2012 at FrostByte Media Studios
- Genre: Hard rock
- Length: 45:42
- Label: FrostByte Media
- Producers: Johnny K, Tony McQuaid, Adam Arling, Maor Applebaum

The Last Vegas chronology
Whatever Gets You Off (2009)	Bad Decisions (2012)	Sweet Salvation (2014)

Professional ratings
Review scores
Source	Rating
Allmusic	3.5/5 stars
Sleaze Roxx	5/5 stars
Hard Rock Hideout	8.5/10 stars

Bad Decisions is the fifth studio album by American hard rock band The Last Vegas, released on August 28, 2012, on FrostByte Media label.

== Singles ==
- The first single from the album was "Other Side" on November 3, 2011.
- The second single from the album was "Evil Eyes" on July 11, 2012.
- The third single from the album was "She's My Confusion" on May 28, 2013.

== Track listing ==
All tracks are written by The Last Vegas.

No.	Title	Length
1.	"Beat To Hell"	3:49
2.	"Other Side"	3:06
3.	"Bad Decisions"	3:32
4.	"Evil Eyes"	4:19
5.	"Don't Take It So Hard"	4:17
6.	"She's My Confusion"	3:01
7.	"It Ain't Easy"	4:10
8.	"My Way Forever"	3:44
9.	"Leonida"	3:49
10.	"Devil In You"	3:37
11.	"You Are The One"	3:33
12.	"Good Night"	4:44
Total length:		45:42

=== Bonus tracks ===
13. "Waste Your Time" (ITunes Bonus Track)

== Personnel ==
- Chad Cherry – lead vocals
- Adam Arling – guitar
- Johnny Wator – guitar
- Danny Smash – bass
- Nate Arling – drums, percussion

Additional musicians

- Ashley Wolf - vocals (5)
- John San Juan - synthesizers and keyboards (1,6)
