= Mondo Topless (band) =

American rock band

- Origin: Philadelphia, Pennsylvania
- Genre: Garage rock
- Years active: 1992–2011
- Label: Get Hip Recordings
- Website: mondotopless.com

Mondo Topless were an American rock band from Philadelphia, Pennsylvania.

== History ==
Mondo Topless formed in 1992 in Philadelphia, and take their name from the 1966 film of the same name. The group's Stooges-inspired garage rock is distinguished by their use of a Vox Continental electric organ. Their debut single was the 1995 7" release, "I Want You To" b/w "Real Gone Girl", with their first full-length following the next year. They followed its release with touring across the United States for two years, until breaking to release their sophomore effort, 1998's Get Ready for Action. Go Fast!, the group's third full-length, appeared in 2002. Further touring around the U.S. followed the album's release. Take it Slow, was released in 2006, and features covers of songs by Paul Revere & the Raiders and Solomon Burke. Their most recent LP, "Freaking Out", is an all covers album, including interpretations of songs by Cream & Camper Van Beethoven among others. After nearly 20 years, leader Steinig retired the Mondo Topless name in early 2011 after the departures of Kris Alutius, Scott Rodgers, and Steve Thrash. The three performed briefly as The Mud Falcons before dissolving. Rodgers continues to play with Philadelphia-based country/roots band Hank's Cadillac, with whom he has performed since 2005.

Steinig formed a new band - The GTVs - in late 2011. The GTVs have an album slated for release in late 2013 on the Italian Label 'Teen Sounds'.

== Former members ==
- Sam Steinig - vocals, organ, percussion (1992–2011)
- Rick Halter - guitar (1992–1994)
- Craig Surgent - guitar (1994–1995)
- Vince Friel - guitar (1995–1999)
- Kris Alutius - guitar, vocals (1999–2011)
- Bob Dicks - bass (1992)
- Juliette Watts - bass (1992–1995)
- Jamie Mahon - bass (1995–1996)
- Scott Parker - bass (1996)
- Scott Rodgers - bass, vocals (1996–1999, 2004–2011)
- John Loxterman - bass (1999–2004)
- Eddie Beinlich - drums (1992–1993)
- Tom Connors - drums (1993–2007)
- Alex Beisker - drums (2007–2008)
- Steve Thrash - drums (2008–2011)

== Discography ==
- Fifty Thousand Dollar Hand Job (360 Twist, 1996)
- Get Ready for Action (Dionysus Records, 1998)
- Go Fast! (Get Hip Recordings, 2002)
- Take it Slow (Get Hip Recordings, 2006)
- Freaking Out (Get Hip Recordings, 2010)
