= OJM (band) =

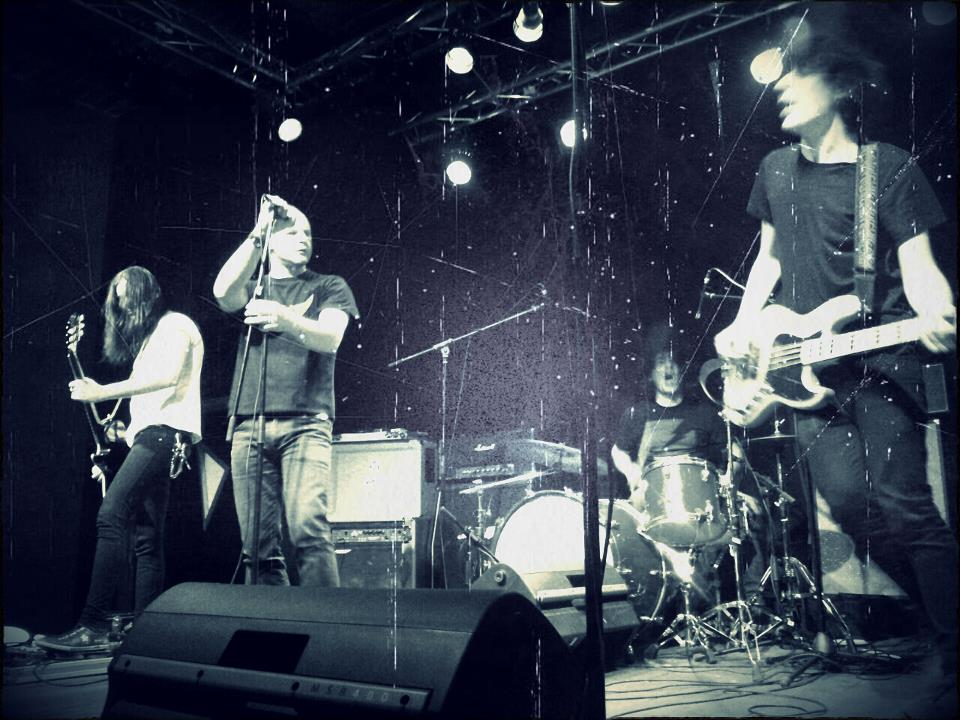
- OJM Volcano Tour 2013

Background information
- Origin: Italy
- Genres: Garage rock, stoner Rock
- Years active: 1997–present
- Labels: Go Down Records; Agitato Records; Beard of Stars Records
- Website: www.ojm.it

OJM is an Italian music band based out of Treviso and formed in 1997. The band is a pioneer of the Italian stoner rock, garage rock and psychedelic rock music scenes.

== History ==
OJM was formed in 1997 by singer David Martin and drummer Max Ear. Their early sound is a mix of stoner rock and psychedelic rock, experimented in their first EP (Extended Playing), which was produced and released in February, 2000, by Agitato Records/Venus.

OJM's first full-length album Heavy was released in 2002. It was produced by Paul Chain and released by Beard of Stars Records. The album got positive reviews and feedbacks from music critics like Kerrang!, Stonerrock.com, Stonedgods, Metal Hammer and others, and helped the band gain international visibility.

In 2003, the band sound became more influenced by rock'n'roll and garage rock, and a split album featuring British band Gorilla was released by Beard of Stars Records.

In October 2003, the band was back to the studio. Their second full-length album, The Light Album, was released in 2004 by Go Down Records, supported by the Italian distributor Audioglobe and the European distributors Sonic Rendezvous and Cargo. The videoclip of their first single, Talking About Revolution, was broadcast on the most prominent of the national music channels (MTV, TV Rock, All Music, YosTV ).

OJM played gigs with well-known bands and artists like MC5, Iggy And The Stooges, The Datsuns, Motorpsycho, Brant Bjork, Lords Of Altamont, Gorilla, Fu Manchu, Marlene Kuntz, Hardcore Superstar, Nebula, Josiah, and The Fleshtones.

After the release of The Light Album, OJM's formation changed. Matt Bordin and Frank Puglie gave way to Andrew Pozzy (bass guitar) and Alex Germany (electric guitar).

In summer 2005, the band recorded a single with the Californian artist Brant Bjork, and the LP was released in 2006 by Go Down Records.

March 2006 signed the beginning of an important collaboration for the band; Michael Davis from MC5 became the producer of their third full-length album Under The Thunder, which was released in November 2006 by Go Down Records. Straight after this release the band started an intense live activity in Italy and Europe.

Live In France is OJM's first live album was initially distributed for free through the web, and was then printed in 500 copies in LP format. Go Down Records released it in April 2008.

In December 2008, the band played in a tour called OJM & Eeviac Rock Show. The live performance of the band was combined with video projections created by Eeviac.

In 2009, the formation changed again; guitar player Alex Germany left and Andrew Pozzy took his place. In addition, Stefano Pasky joined the band as the electric bass, electronic organ and piano bass player.

Volcano is the name of their fourth full-length album, realized and recorded with the new band formation. It was released in September 2010 by Go Down Records. The album was produced by Dave Catching (Eagles of Death Metal, Queens Of The Stone Age). After the album's release, the band began a live activity in Italy and Europe.

== Band members ==
=== Current members ===
- David Martin - Vocals
- Max Ear - Drums
- Andrew Pozzy - Guitars, backing vocals
- Steven Deluxe - Bass

=== Former members ===
- Massimiliano Bandiera - Bass (1997–1999).
- Frank Puglie - Guitars (Extended Playing - Heavy - The Light Album).
- Matt Bordin - Bass (Extended Playing - Heavy - The Light Album) guitars e vocals (The Light Album).
- Cristian De Bortoli – Bass (2003).
- Nene Baratto – Bass (2004).
- Alex Germany - Guitars (I Got Time - Under The Thunder – Live In France).
- Gazzola Riccardo – Theremin e percussions (2009).
- Stefano Pasky - Piano Bass, electric organ, bass, vocals (Volcano).

== Discography ==
=== EP ===
- 2000 – Extended Playing (Agitato Records/Venus)

=== Studio albums ===
- 2002 – Heavy (Beard of Stars Records)
- 2004 – The Light Album (Go Down Records)
- 2006 – Under The Thunder (Go Down Records)
- 2010 – Volcano (Go Down Records)

=== Live albums ===
- 2008 – Live In France (Go Down Records)
- 2021 – Live at Rocket Club (Go Down Records)

=== Compilation albums ===
- 2015 – 18th Anniversary (Go Down Records)

=== Split albums ===
- 2003 – OJM /Gorilla Split (Beard of Stars Records)

=== Singles ===
- 2006 – I Got Time (with Brant Bjork) (Go Down Records)
- 2021 – "I'll Be Long" (Go Down Records)
- 2021 – "Hard Ducks" (Go Down Records)
- 2021 – "Venus - Live at Rocket Club" (Go Down Records)
- 2021 – "Ocean Hearts - Live at Rocket Club" (Go Down Records)

== Videoclips ==
- 2001 - The Sleeper
- 2004 - Talking About Revolution
- 2006 - Sixties
- 2010 - I’ll Be Long
- 2010 - Venus God
- 2011 - 2012
