= Can't Get Enough of You Baby =

1966 single by the Four Seasons

Song by the Four Seasons

from the album Working My Way Back to You and More Great New Hits
- Released: 1965
- Length: 2:28
- Label: Philips
- Songwriters: Sandy Linzer; Denny Randell
- Producer: Bob Crewe

"Can't Get Enough of You Baby"

Single by ? and the Mysterians

from the album Action
- B-side: "Smokes"
- Released: March 1967
- Genre: Garage rock, proto-punk
- Length: 2:00
- Label: Cameo-Parkway
- Songwriters: Sandy Linzer; Denny Randell
- Producer: Rudy Martinez

? and the Mysterians singles chronology
"I Need Somebody" (1966)	"Can't Get Enough of You Baby" (1967)	"Beachcomber" (1967)

"Can't Get Enough of You Baby" is a song written by Denny Randell and Sandy Linzer and first recorded by American band the Four Seasons in 1965 for their album Working My Way Back to You and More Great New Hits. The protopunk band ? and the Mysterians recorded it in 1967 for their second album Action. Their version reached No. 38 on Canada's RPM 100 chart and No. 56 on the US Billboard Hot 100 when it was released as a single.

== Smash Mouth version ==
"Can't Get Enough of You Baby"

Single by Smash Mouth

from the album Astro Lounge and Can't Hardly Wait: Music from the Motion Picture
- Released: May 11, 1998
- Genre: Alternative rock
- Length: 2:30
- Label: Elektra
- Songwriters: Sandy Linzer, Denny Randell
- Producer: Eric Valentine

Smash Mouth singles chronology
"Why Can't We Be Friends?" (1998)	"Can't Get Enough of You Baby" (1998)	"All Star" (1999)

Audio video
- "Can't Get Enough Of You Baby" on YouTube

The song was covered by American rock band Smash Mouth for the soundtrack to the 1998 film Can't Hardly Wait and was released as the lead single from the band's album Astro Lounge (1999).

=== Music video ===
The music video takes place at a school dance in a gymnasium. First, we see a lady put a film reel into an old projector. The band immediately begins to perform once the projector starts and it shows a quick fly-by montage of the band performing and the students dancing. Then, other shots of students dancing, which includes a girl dancing on a basketball hoop. Afterwards, we see the band performing while the students continue to dance. Another fly-by montage follows, including scenes from the film Can't Hardly Wait. Then, the scenes between the music video and the film alter. Suddenly, while a man sings with his woman off-key, the band stops and Harwell tells him, "Dude, this is my show!" Shortly after, the band continues playing as more shots between the film and the music video continue. Then, the projector shows some scenes from the film on a small screen with a giant American flag in the background. A girl in the crowd (Jennifer Love Hewitt) notices Harwell, which then leads to her coming on stage to dance with him. The music video ends with the projector shutting off.

=== Charts ===
==== Weekly charts ====
Chart (1998–1999)	Peak position
Australia (ARIA)	14
Canada Top Singles (RPM)	8
Canada Adult Contemporary (RPM)	56
US Radio Songs (Billboard)	27
US Adult Pop Airplay (Billboard)	14
US Alternative Airplay (Billboard)	30
US Pop Airplay (Billboard)	18

==== Year-end charts ====
Chart (1998)	Position
Australia (ARIA)	94
Canada Top Singles (RPM)	55
US Adult Top 40 (Billboard)	42
US Mainstream Top 40 (Billboard)	84

=== Certifications ===
Region	Certification	Certified units/sales
Australia (ARIA)	Gold	35,000^{^}
^{^} Shipments figures based on certification alone.

=== Release history ===
Region	Date	Format	Label	Ref.
United States	May 11, 1998	Alternative radio	Elektra	
United States	June 9, 1998	Contemporary hit radio	Elektra	

== Other versions ==
- The Toys recorded a version of the song for their 1966 album The Toys Sing "A Lover's Concerto" and "Attack!".
- The Colourfield recorded a version of the song for their 1985 album Virgins and Philistines. This version was used in the 1999 film 10 Things I Hate About You.
