= Bad Compilation Tapes =

US record label

BCT
- Founded: 1982
- Founder: Chris Chacon
- Genre: Punk rock Hardcore punk
- Country of origin: USA
- Location: San Diego, California

Bad Compilation Tapes / Borderless Countries Tapes is an independent punk/hardcore music label founded in 1982 by Chris Chacon and Dave W. in San Diego, California. The label, with a declared DIY ethic, published from 1981 to 1986 twenty-seven compilations on cassette involving 149 groups from 17 countries. It still sold tapes until around the year 2000, but it made the last 2 tapes of the 27 in 1986. It is considered one of the labels that contributed most to the spread of the European hardcore punk scene in North America. They are currently being remastered and reissued on Bandcamp.

== History of BCT ==
=== 1982-1986: Bad Compilation Tapes ===
In 1982 BCT published an announcement on the 8th issue of Maximumrocknroll asking punk groups to send their compositions to them. The announcement was then reprinted in several European magazines and the Italian fanzines TVOR and Attack Punkzine, which contributed a lot to the internationalization of the label. BCT placed a small personal ad in Rockerilla, the most important alternative music magazine in Italy at the time. Syd Migx, the frontman of CCM (Cheetah Chrome Motherfuckers), responded to it asking the Italian Roberto Schiavo, founder of the F.O.G. (Flowers of Grain Records), to send tapes of Italian punk bands to BCT which he did. From those tapes the label made its first Italian compilation tapes.
The first tape of the label, titled First Strike, included bands from the US such as Clitboys, Future Ruins, Violation, Vatican Commandos (with a very young Moby on guitar), Mr. Epp & The Calculations (the band of Mark Arm and Steve Turner, which later became Green River and then Mudhoney), Skoundrelz (the band of famous skater Tony Alva) and Eat The Rich, while the second tape Music On Fire featured bands from the Italian punk scene such as 5° Braccio, Raw Power, Indigesti, Wretched, Stazione Suicida, Crash Box and Rappresaglia.
The 22nd tape is dedicated to the rising Spanish punk/hardcore scene

The BCT logo was a character called Moe Hawk drawn in black and white by Dan, the singer of Eat the Rich from San Jose. Craig Caron, the founder of Schizophrenic Records, colored the image and used it to release the vinyl version of the BCT # 18 tape: Thrash, Therefore I Am.

The two tapes were followed by other releases featuring many bands from around the world: the Finns Rattus and Terveet Kädet, the Danish Razor Blades and Disrespect, the Swedes Mob 47, Product Assar, Moderat Likvidation and Anti Cimex, the Germans Äni(X)Väx and Kanalkotzer, the Australians Vicious Circle and the Canadians The Bill Of Rights were just some of the many acts included on the international productions of the BCT label.

Between 1986 and 1987 the publication also extended to other formats under the name of BC Tapes & Records, whose first release was a compilation on LP entitled We Can Do Whatever We Want (International Comp.) which saw a mix of European and American bands and was a best of the first 11 tapes.

=== 2002: Reprints and new publications ===
In 2002 the label re-issued five cds and one lp of 7 of BCT tapes. BCT worked with a consortium of labels for those re-issues: Enterruption of San Francisco, Human Stench of Pittsfield, MA and Schizophrenic Records of Hamilton, Canada who did 2 releases each in conjunction with BCT. Among these reprints there was Senza Tregua: Granducato Hardcore (2002), an album that for the new edition commissioned the cover of the album to Winston Smith, the historical author of the Dead Kennedys logo and album covers.

=== 2020s: Remasters and Reissues ===
Starting in 2020, with the co-operation of Chris Chacon, the BCT tapes have been subject to a remastering process and are being officially re-issued on Bandcamp, under the name Borderless Countries Tapes. Because the original master tapes have been lost, digitally re-constructing the tapes from a variety of sources has been necessary.

== BCT and Italy ==
In 1984 Chris Chacon reconfirmed his interest in the Italian scene by first releasing cassette releases by Raw Power titled Studio + Live, as well as the two Last White Christmas tapes, which were recordings of the LWC event held on December 4, 1983 in Pisa, Italy by the punk cooperative G.D.H.C. (Granducato Hardcore). BCT noted in advertisements for the Last White Christmas tapes that the G.D.H.C. organized the event for "Johnny in Jail", and that the cassettes were made available in cooperation with Cessophena Records. In the same year, some Italian fanzines began to call the label Borderless Countries Tapes, a name that was officially adopted and added to the original name. The name came from the suggestion of an Italian punk fan via mail.

=== BCT and tours of Italian bands in the USA ===
Following the Raw Power release, Chris Chacon organized a tour of the band, which was also the first tour of an Italian hardcore punk band in the United States. During the tour, that included 32 shows in 40 days, Raw Power played at the Olympic Auditorium in Los Angeles with the Dead Kennedys in front of more than 5,000 people. It was in those days that the independent label Toxic Shock Records of Pomona, California came forward for the release of the second Raw Power album Screams From The Gutter, which was recorded in Indianapolis near the end of the tour, at Paul Mahern's (of Zero Boys) studio in just a day and a half. The album was released in 1985 and sold more than 40,000 copies via independent channels. In the same period BCT published Live in the USA, a cassette with all the best songs recorded on tour (selected from 15 tapes of 20 concerts).

In the autobiographical novel by Silvio Bernelli entitled I ragazzi del Mucchio, the bassist of Declino, Negazione and Indigesti describes the US tour of the latter, organized and promoted by BCT in 1986 . The label, for the occasion, also produced the EP on 7" vinyl The Sand Through the Green. The tour, which lasted 40 days with 20 concerts, departed from Philadelphia and ended up in San Francisco, touching also St. George in Utah with the very young NOFX, who had just released their second album.

=== BCT and LWC35 ===
In December 2018 the 35th anniversary of Last White Christmas was celebrated with the LWC35 concert in the historic Lumiere cinema of Pisa, the first cinema to be opened in Italy (1899). In the cinema hall there was an exhibition of 35 posters made by Italian and international graphic designers and illustrators for the 35th anniversary of the concert. Among the artists who participated with their own work created for the 35th anniversary of the concert there were: Winston Smith, Craig Henning, John Yarbrough (designer of the cover of the first concert release on cassettes), Tuono Pettinato, Vittore Baroni, Giuseppe Palumbo and Prof.Bad Trip. The official poster of the LWC35 festival was designed by Danijel Žeželj. In June 2020 an Italian record company reprinted the Last White Christmas concert thanks to the granting of free reprint rights by Chris Chacon of BCT.

== Some bands released by BCT ==
=== From USA ===
- Vatican Commandos
- White Flag
- The Accüsed
- Happy Flowers
- Mr. Epp and the Calculations
- Skoundrelz
- White Flag
- Disorderly Conduct
- Deranged Diction

=== From Australia ===
- Vicious Circle

=== From Italy ===
- Cheetah Chrome Motherfuckers
- Wretched
- Raw Power
- Not Moving
- I Refuse It!
- Indigesti
- Nabat

=== From Spain ===
- RIP
- Último Resorte
- Frenopaticss
- Anti/Dogmatikss

=== From Germany ===
- Äni(X)Väx
- Kanalkotzer

=== From Finland ===
- Kaaos
- Rattus
- Terveet Kädet

=== From Canada ===
- The Bill Of Rights

=== From Sweden ===
- Mob 47
- Moderat Likvidation
- Anti Cimex

=== From Norway ===
- Akutt Innleggelse

=== From Denmark ===
- The Razor Blades
- Disrespect

=== From Brazil ===
- Cólera
- Inocentes
- Ratos de Porão

=== From Holland ===
- Funeral Oration

=== From England ===
- Xpozez

== Bibliography ==
- Vv.Aa. (1990). Studies in Latin American Popular Culture - Volume 9. University of Texas Press. p. 82
- Cesare Rizzi (1993). Enciclopedia del rock italiano. Milano: Arcana. p. 481
- Humphrey, Clark (1995). Loser: The Real Seattle Music Story. Minneapolis, Minnesota: Feral House. ISBN 978-0922915279.
- Philopat, Marco (2006). Lumi di punk: la scena italiana raccontata dai protagonisti. Milan, Italy: Agenzia X. ISBN 978-8895029085. pp. 219, 221 and 222
- Rottame, Stiv (2006). Teste Vuote Ossa Rotte 1980-1985 storia di una caoszine hardcore punx. Milano: Edizioni Lovehate. ISBN 978-8897389026.
- Philopat, Marco (2006). Costretti a sanguinare. Il romanzo del punk italiano 1977-1984. Torino: Einaudi. ISBN 978-8806183059.
- Hegarty, Paul (2007). Noise/Music: A History. Continuum. ISBN 978-0826417275.
- Calmbach, Marc (2007). More than Music: Einblicke in die Jugendkultur Hardcore (Cultural Studies). Bielefeld, Germany: Transcript-Verlag. ISBN 978-3899427042. pp. 119 and 153
- Fornaca, Andrea (2009). Do it yourself. Culture di resistenza e azione diretta. Bepress. ISBN 978-8896130063.
- Bernelli, Silvio (2009). I ragazzi del Mucchio. Milano: Sironi Editore. ISBN 978-8851801274. pp. 43, 94, 164-165 and 174
- Blush, Steven (2010). American Hardcore: A Tribal History. Minneapolis, Minnesota: Feral House. ISBN 978-1932595895. pp. 374, 390, 393 and 398
- Ensminger, David A. (2011). Visual Vitriol: The Street Art and Subcultures of the Punk and Hardcore Generation. University Press of Mississippi. ISBN 978-1617030734. p. 216
- Bestley, Russ; Ogg, Alex; Loren, Dennis (2012). The Art of Punk: The Illustrated History of Punk Rock Design. Minneapolis, Minnesota: Voyageur Press. ISBN 978-0760344101. pp. 162–164
- Ensminger, David A. (2013). Left of the Dial: Conversations with Punk Icons. PM Press. ISBN 978-1604866414.
- Cecchi, Antonio (2017). No more pain. Viaggio nell'anima. Pisa: Ed. Area Pirata Record. ISBN 978-8894207606. pp. 70–72
- Greene, James (2017). Brave Punk World: The International Rock Underground. Lanham, Maryland, U.S.: Rowman & Littlefield Publishers. ISBN 978-1442269842. p. 192
- Senesi, Giorgio (2019). Dritti contro un muro. L'hardcore punk italiano degli anni '80 raccontato da 140 protagonisti. Feltrinelli. ISBN 979-1220047739.
- El Drito, Pablito (2020). Dalla parte del torto. Una storia hippie punk e rave. Milano: Agenzia X. ISBN 978-8831268271.

== Documentary ==
- Bitonto, Angelo; Senesi, Giorgio S.; Sivilia, Roberto (2015). Italian Punk Hardcore: 1980-1989 Il Film - The movie. LoveHate80, F.O.A.D. Records.
