= 96 Tears =

1966 single by ? and the Mysterians

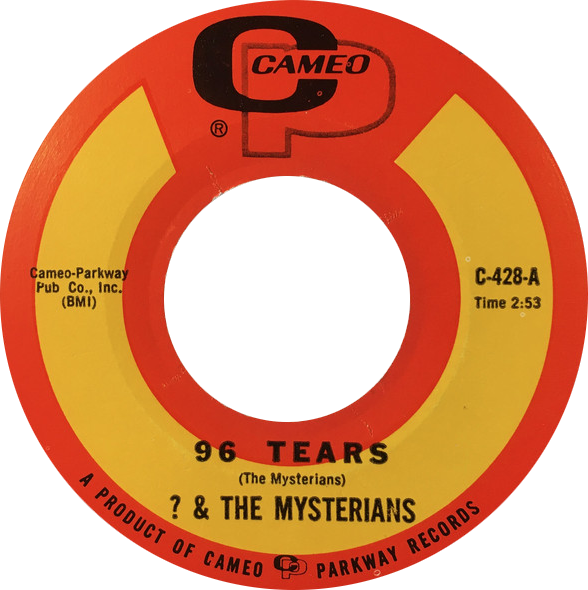
- One of side-A labels of US single release

Single by ? and the Mysterians

from the album 96 Tears
- B-side: "Midnight Hour"
- Released: August 1966
- Recorded: 1966 in Bay City, Michigan
- Genre: Garage rock; pop rock; psychedelic rock
- Length: 2:56
- Label: Pa-Go-Go; Cameo-Parkway
- Songwriter: Rudy Martinez
- Producer: Rudy Martinez

? and the Mysterians singles chronology
"96 Tears" (1966)	"I Need Somebody" (1966)

"96 Tears" is a song by the American garage rock band ? and the Mysterians released in August 1966. In October of that year, it was #1 on the Billboard Hot 100 in the U.S. and on the RPM 100 in Canada. Billboard ranked the record as the #5 song for 1966. It was ranked #213 on the Rolling Stone list of the 500 Greatest Songs of All Time in 2010. On November 11, 1966, the single was certified as gold by the RIAA. It was the first of three songs they had in the Canadian Top 40.

== Background ==
The song was written by Question Mark (Rudy Martinez) in 1962 in his manager's living room, and was recorded in Bay City, Michigan. Initially, Question Mark had to insist that "96 Tears" be the A-side over "Midnight Hour". Once the issue was settled, the band recorded the single for the small Pa-Go-Go label, owned by Lilly Gonzalez. She backed the band financially, and allowed access to her personal studio in her basement. When it began doing well locally, the band took a recording to Bob Dell, the radio director in Flint, Michigan. The song became the most requested, and wider radio play spread into Canada, where it was picked up by Cameo Records for national distribution.

Various reports have suggested that Question Mark first wrote the song under the title "Too Many Teardrops" and then "69 Tears", but then changed the title, fearing that radio stations would not play the song. However, Question Mark denied this in an interview, stating that the number 96 has a deep philosophical meaning for him.

Known for its signature organ riffs and bare-bones lyrics, "96 Tears" is recognized as one of the first garage band hits, and has even been given credit for starting the punk rock movement. In Vice Media, Legs McNeil said "96 Tears" is "a safe candidate for first punk rock song ever."

The song appeared on the band's album 96 Tears. The follow-up song, "I Need Somebody", peaked at #22 later that year, but no other U.S. Top 40 singles followed.

== Charts ==
=== Weekly charts ===
? and the Mysterians

Chart (1966)	Peak position
Austria (Ö3 Austria Top 40)	11
Belgium (Ultratop 50 Wallonia)	20
Brazil (O Globo)	3
Canada RPM Top Singles	1
France (IFOP)	7
UK Singles (Official Charts)	37
US Billboard Hot 100	1
US Cash Box Top 100	1
US Record World 100 Top Pops	1
West Germany (Media Control)	27

The Stranglers

Chart (1990)	Peak position
Ireland (IRMA)	9
UK	17

=== Year-end charts ===
Chart (1966)	Rank
US Billboard Hot 100	5
US Cash Box Top 100	19

== Personnel ==
- Rudy Martinez (Question Mark) – vocals
- Frank Rodriguez – Vox Continental organ
- Bobby Balderrama – lead guitar
- Frank Lugo – bass guitar
- Eddie Serrato – drums

== Other versions ==
- A Spanish version of the song was also recorded by ? and the Mysterians.
- Big Maybelle released a version of the song as a single in 1967 that reached #23 on the US R&B chart and #96 on the US pop chart.
- Aretha Franklin released a version of the song on her second Atlantic studio album Aretha Arrives in 1967.
- Jimmy Ruffin, older brother of David Ruffin, released a version of the song on his second Tamla/Motown studio album "Ruff'n Ready" in 1969.
- Eddie and the Hot Rods covered "96 Tears" on their debut EP, Live at the Marquee, released in 1976.
- Thelma Houston released a version of the song as a single in 1981 that reached #22 on the US dance chart and #76 on the US R&B chart.
- Garland Jeffreys released a version of the song as a single and track from his album "Escape Artist" in 1981 that reached #5 on the US rock chart, #66 on the US pop chart, and #75 on the US dance chart.
- Inspiral Carpets released a version on “Plane Crash EP” in 1988.
- The Stranglers released a version that reached #17 in the UK Singles Chart in 1990.

== Cultural references ==
In addition to its impact on music, "96 Tears" has influenced pop culture, including the naming of a bar in New York City’s East Village. The bar, also called "96 Tears", is inspired by the song and its iconic place in garage rock history.

The song is also mentioned on the B-52s song “Deadbeat Club”.

Andrew Eldtritch, lead singer / song-writer in the Sisters of Mercy, references "96 Tears" in the line '96 below the waves' in his band's 1983 release, "Temple of Love".

The Cramps reference the song in their 1978 track, "Human Fly" with the lyric "I got 96 tears, and 96 eyes."

== See also ==
- List of 1960s one-hit wonders in the United States
