= The Four Seasons discography =

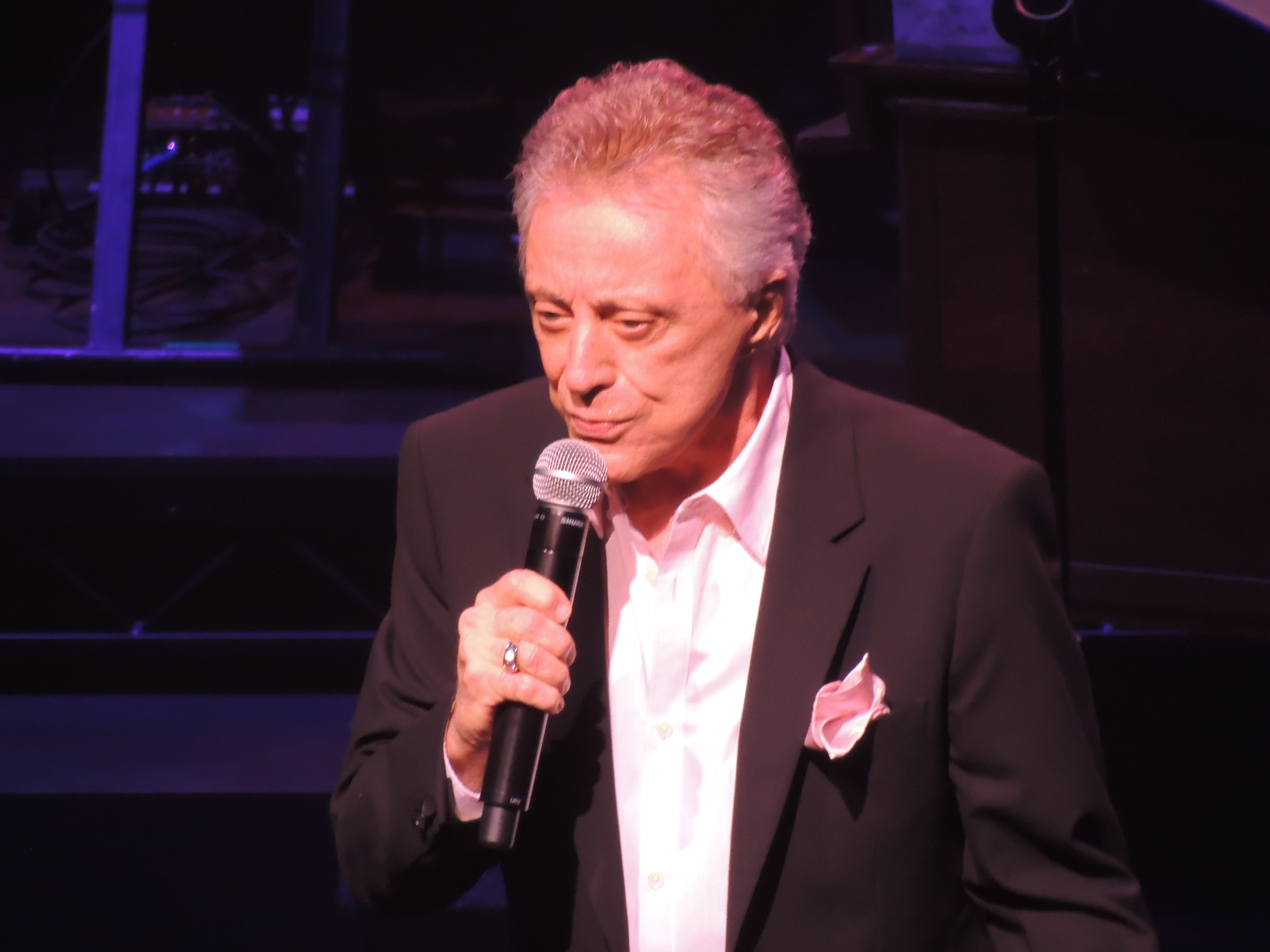
Frankie Valli

This is a list of singles and some albums recorded and released by Frankie Valli and/or The Four Seasons in their various guises since 1953. This list includes only commercially released singles on which Valli or some configuration of the group was credited with performing or producing. Promotional-only releases and extended play records (EPs) are omitted from this list.

Reissued singles and records in which the Four Lovers did only session work (including singles by Danny & the Juniors, Freddy Cannon, and Bobby Darin) are also not included here.

== Albums ==
=== Studio albums ===
==== The Four Lovers ====
Title	Album details
Joyride	Released: September 1956; Label: RCA Victor; Format: LP

==== The Four Seasons ====
Title	Album details	Peak chart positions		Certifications (sales thresholds)
Title	Album details	US	UK	Certifications (sales thresholds)
Sherry & 11 Others	Released: September 1962; Label: Vee-Jay; Format: LP	6	20	
The 4 Seasons Greetings	Released: December 1962; Label: Vee-Jay; Format: LP	13	—	
Big Girls Don't Cry and Twelve Others...	Released: February 1963; Label: Vee-Jay; Format: LP	8	—	
The 4 Seasons Sing Ain't That a Shame and 11 Others	Released: June 1963; Label: Vee-Jay; Format: LP	47	—	
Born to Wander	Released: February 1964; Label: Philips; Format: LP	84	—	
Dawn (Go Away) and 11 Other Great Songs	Released: March 1964; Label: Philips; Format: LP	6	—	
Rag Doll	Released: July 1964; Label: Philips; Format: LP	7	—	
The 4 Seasons Entertain You	Released: March 1965; Label: Philips; Format: LP	77	—	
The 4 Seasons Sing Big Hits by Burt Bacharach... Hal David... Bob Dylan...	Released: November 1965; Label: Philips; Format: LP	106	—	
Working My Way Back to You and More Great New Hits	Released: January 1966; Label: Philips; Format: LP	50	—	
New Gold Hits	Released: May 1967; Label: Philips; Format: LP	37	—	
The Genuine Imitation Life Gazette	Released: January 1969; Label: Philips; Format: LP	85	—	
Half & Half (half Four Seasons, half Frankie Valli solo)	Released: May 1970; Label: Philips; Format: LP	190	—	
Chameleon	Released: May 1972; Label: MoWest; Format: LP	—	—	
Who Loves You	Released: November 1975; Label: Warner Bros.; Format: LP	38	12	BPI: Gold
Helicon	Released: April 1977; Label: Warner Bros.; Format: LP	168	—	
Streetfighter	Released: August 1985; Label: MCA/Curb; Format: LP	—	—	
Hope + Glory	Released: September 1992; Label: Curb; Format: LP	—	—	
Jersey Babys: The Instrumental Music of Frankie Valli and the Four Seasons for Kids	Released: 2008; Label: Green Hill Records; Format: CD; Re-released in 2024.	—	—	
"—" denotes releases that did not chart.

==== Frankie Valli ====
Title	Album details	Peak chart positions	
Title	Album details	US	AUS
The 4 Seasons Present Frankie Valli Solo	Released: June 1967; Label: Philips; Format: LP	34	—
Timeless	Released: July 1968; Label: Philips; Format: LP	176	—
Closeup	Released: February 1975; Label: Private Stock; Format: LP	51	70
Inside You	Released: September 1975; Label: MoWest; Format: LP	—	—
Our Day Will Come	Released: November 1975; Label: Private Stock; Format: LP	107	—
Valli	Released: September 1976; Label: Private Stock; Format: LP	—	—
Lady Put the Light Out	Released: November 1977; Label: Private Stock; Format: LP	—	—
Frankie Valli... Is the Word	Released: August 1978; Label: Warner Bros; Format: LP	160	—
Heaven Above Me	Released: November 1980; Label: MCA/Curb; Format: LP, Cassette	—	—
Romancing the '60s	Released: January 2007; Label: Universal Motown/Universal Music Group; Format: CD	—	—
'Tis the Seasons	Released: October 14, 2016; Label: Rhino; Format: CD, digital download, streaming	—	—
A Touch of Jazz	Released: June 25, 2021; Label: Four Seasons Partnership; Format: CD, digital download, streaming	—	—
"—" denotes releases that did not chart.

==== Jersey Babys (sic) ====
Title	Album details
Jersey Babys: The Instrumental Music of Frankie Valli and the Four Seasons for Kids	Released: 2008 (re-released in 2024); Label: Green Hill Records; Format: CD

=== Live albums ===
==== The Four Seasons ====
Title	Album details	Peak US chart position
On Stage with The 4 Seasons	Released: November 1965; Label: Vee-Jay; Format: LP	68
Reunited Live	Released: January 1981; Label: Warner Bros; Format: LP	—

=== Compilation albums ===
Title	Album details	Peak chart positions		Certifications (sales thresholds)
Title	Album details	US	UK	Certifications (sales thresholds)
Golden Hits of the 4 Seasons	Released: August 1963; Label: Vee-Jay; Format: LP	15	—	
Folk-Nanny (reissued as Stay and Other Great Hits in 1964)	Released: September 1963; Label: Vee-Jay; Format: LP	100	—	
More Golden Hits by the Four Seasons	Released: August 1964; Label: Vee-Jay; Format: LP	105	—	
The International Battle of the Century: The Beatles vs. the Four Seasons	Released: October 1964; Label: Vee-Jay; Format: LP	142	—	
The 4 Seasons' Gold Vault of Hits	Released: November 1965; Label: Philips; Format: LP	10	—	RIAA: Gold
The 4 Seasons' 2nd Vault of Golden Hits	Released: November 1966; Label: Philips; Format: LP	22	—	RIAA: Gold
Lookin' Back	Released: November 1966; Label: Philips; Format: LP	107	—	
The 4 Seasons' Christmas Album (reissue of previously released The Four Seasons Greetings)	Released: November 1966; Label: Philips; Format: LP	28	—	
Edizione D'Oro: The 4 Seasons Gold Edition – 29 Gold Hits	Released: December 1968; Label: Philips; Format: LP	37	11 (Note: Chart position from 1971.)	RIAA: Gold
The Four Seasons Story	Released: December 1975; Label: Private Stock; Format: LP	51	20	RIAA: Gold; BPI: Silver
Frankie Valli & the Four Seasons – The Greatest Hits	Released: November 1976; Label: K-tel; Format: LP	—	4	BPI: Platinum
25th Anniversary Collection	Released: May 1988; Label: Rhino; Format: CD	—	38	
Hits	Released: December 1988; Label: MCA/Curb; Format: CD	—	—	
Rarities Volume 1	Released: June 1990; Label: Rhino; Format: CD	—	—	
Rarities Volume 2	Released: June 1990; Label: Rhino; Format: CD	—	—	
The Very Best Of Frankie Valli & the Four Seasons	Released: June 1992; Label: PolyGram TV; Format: CD	—	7	BPI: Gold
December 1963 (Oh, What a Night): The Dance Album	Released: July 1993; Label: Curb; Format: CD	—	—	
Oh, What a Night	Released: January 1995; Label: Curb; Format: CD	—	—	
The Definitive Frankie Valli & the Four Seasons	Released: October 2001; Label: WSM; Format: CD	—	26	BPI: Gold
The Very Best of Frankie Valli & the Four Seasons	Released: 2002; Label: Rhino; Format: CD	—	—	RIAA: Gold
Beggin' – The Ultimate Collection	Released: April 2006; Label: 679; Format: CD	—	82	
...Jersey Beat... The Music of Frankie Valli & the 4 Seasons (3-CD and 1-DVD boxed set)	Released: June 2007; Label: Rhino; Format: CD	—	53 (Note: Chart position from 2013.)	
Jersey's Best	Released: May 2008; Label: Rhino; Format: CD	—	25	BPI: Gold
Working My Way Back to You	Released: March 2011; Label: Rhino; Format: CD	—	12	BPI: Platinum
Working Our Way Back to You: The Ultimate Collection (44-CD and 1-LP boxed set)	Released: June 2, 2023; Label: Rhino; Format: CD	—	—	
"—" denotes releases that did not chart.

== Singles ==
=== The Four Lovers ===
Year	Single	Peak chart positions
Year	Single	US Hot 100
1956	"You're the Apple of My Eye" "The Girl in My Dreams"	64 —
1956	"Honey Love" "Please Don't Leave Me"	— —
1956	"Jambalaya (On the Bayou)" "Be Lovey Dovey"	— —
1957	"Never Never" "Happy Am I"	— —
1957	"Shake a Hand" "The Stranger"	— —
1957	"The Stranger" "Night Train"	— —
1957	"My Life for your Love" "Pucker Up"	— —
"—" denotes releases that did not chart.

=== The Romans ===
Year	Single	Label	Product number
1959	"Come Si Bella" / "Real (This Is Real)"	Cindy	C-3012

=== The Four Seasons ===
==== 1960s ====
Year	Single	Peak chart positions							Certifications
Year	Single	US	US Cash Box	US Record World	US R&B	AUS	CAN	UK	Certifications
1961	"Bermuda" "Spanish Lace"	— —	— —	— —	— —	— —	— —	— —	
1962	"Sherry" "I've Cried Before"	1 —	1 —	1 —	1 —	15 —	1 —	8 —	BPI: Silver; RMNZ: Gold
1962	"Big Girls Don't Cry" "Connie-O"	1 —	1 —	1 —	1 —	1 —	1 —	13 —	
1962	"Santa Claus Is Coming to Town" "Christmas Tears"	23 —	28 —	12 —	— —	— —	— —	— —	
1963	"Walk Like a Man" "Lucky Ladybug"	1 —	1 —	1 —	3 —	1 —	1 —	12 —	
1963	"Ain't That a Shame" "Soon (I'll Be Home Again)"	22; 77	20; 70	20 —	— —	65 —	20; 46	38 —	
1963	"Candy Girl" "Marlena"	3; 36	4; 35	5; 44	13 —	55 —	2; 49	— —	
1963	"New Mexican Rose" "That's the Only Way"	36; 88	30; 65	30 —	— —	— —	38 —	— —	
1963	"Peanuts" "Stay"	108 —	— —	— —	— —	— —	— —	— —	
1964	"Dawn (Go Away)" "No Surfin' Today"	3 —	3 —	3 —	— —	13 —	3 —	— —	
1964	"Stay" "Goodnight My Love"	16 —	15 —	15 —	— —	22 —	12 —	— —	
1964	"Ronnie" "Born to Wander"	6 —	6 —	6 —	— —	26 —	18 —	— —	
1964	"Alone" "Long Lonely Nights"	28; 102	24; 74	29 —	— —	39 —	8 —	— —	
1964	"Rag Doll" "Silence Is Golden"	1 —	1 —	1 —	— —	3 —	1 —	2 —	US: Gold
1964	"Sincerely" "One Song"	75 —	87 —	— —	— —	— —	— —	— —	
1964	"Save It for Me" "Funny Face"	10 —	9 —	8 —	— —	24 —	1 —	— —	
1964	"Apple of My Eye" "Happy, Happy Birthday Baby"	106 —	— —	— —	— —	95 —	— —	— —	
1964	"Big Man in Town" "Little Angel"	20 —	14 —	14 —	— —	69 —	5 —	— —	
1964	"I Saw Mommy Kissing Santa Claus" "Christmas Tears"	— —	— —	— —	— —	— —	— —	— —	
1965	"Connie-O" "Never on Sunday"	— —	— —	— —	— —	— —	— —	— —	
1965	"Bye, Bye, Baby (Baby Goodbye)" "Searching Wind"	12 —	— —	6 —	— —	— —	1 —	— —	
1965	"Since I Don't Have You" "Tonite, Tonite"	105 —	— —	— —	— —	— —	— —	— —	
1965	"Toy Soldier" "Betrayed"	64 —	62 —	— —	— —	99 —	— —	— —	
1965	"Girl Come Running" "Cry Myself to Sleep"	30 —	— —	23 —	— —	— —	33 —	— —	
1965	"Let's Hang On!" "On Broadway Tonight"	3 —	1 —	— —	— —	50 —	3 —	4 —	
1965	"Little Boy (in Grown Up Clothes)" "Silver Wings"	60 —	— —	— —	— —	— —	3 —	— —	
1965	"Don't Think Twice" (as The Wonder Who?) "Sassy"	12 —	— —	— —	— —	— —	— —	— —	
1966	"Peanuts" (as The Wonder Who?) "My Sugar"	— —	— —	— —	— —	— —	— —	— —	
1966	"Stay" "My Mother's Eyes"	— —	— —	— —	— —	— —	— —	— —	
1966	"Working My Way Back to You" "Too Many Memories"	9 —	— —	— —	— —	92 —	26 —	50 —	
1966	"Opus 17 (Don't You Worry 'Bout Me)" "Beggar's Parade"	13 —	— —	— —	— —	32 —	33 —	20 —	
1966	"On the Good Ship Lollipop" (as The Wonder Who?) "You're Nobody till Somebody Loves You"	87; 96	— —	— —	— —	— —	— —	— —	
1966	"I've Got You Under My Skin" "Huggin' My Pillow"	9 —	— —	— —	— —	63 —	9 —	12 —	
1966	"Tell It to the Rain" "Show Girl"	10 —	— —	— —	— —	48 —	6 —	37 —	
1967	"Beggin'" "Dody"	16 —	— —	— —	— —	— —	8 —	32 (Note: Chart position from 2007.) —	BPI: Silver
1967	"C'mon Marianne" "Let's Ride Again"	9 —	— —	— —	— —	66 —	8 —	— —	
1967	"Lonesome Road" (as The Wonder Who?) "Around and Around"	89 —	— —	— —	— —	— —	— —	— —	
1967	"Watch the Flowers Grow" "Raven"	30 —	— —	— —	— —	— —	39 —	— —	
1968	"Will You Love Me Tomorrow" "Around and Around"	24 —	— —	— —	— —	93 —	15 —	— —	
1968	"Saturday's Father" "Good-Bye Girl"	— —	— —	— —	— —	— —	55 —	— —	
1968	"Electric Stories" "Pity"	61 —	— —	— —	— —	— —	33 —	— —	
1969	"Idaho" "Something's on Her Mind"	95; 98	— —	— —	— —	— —	61 —	— —	
1969	"The Girl I'll Never Know (Angels Never Fly This Low)" "A Face Without a Name"	52 —	— —	— —	— —	— —	— —	— —	
1969	"And That Reminds Me (My Heart Reminds Me)" "The Singles Game"	45 —	— —	— —	— —	— —	28 —	— —	
"—" denotes releases that did not chart or were not released in that territory.

==== 1970s ====
Year	Single	Peak chart positions							Certifications
Year	Single	US	US Cash Box	US Record World	US AC	AUS	CAN	UK	Certifications
1970	"Patch of Blue" "She Gives Me Light"	94 —	53 —	56 —	— —	— —	56 —	— —	
1970	"Lay Me Down (Wake Me Up)" "Heartaches and Raindrops"	— —	— —	— —	— —	— —	— —	— —	
1970	"Where Are My Dreams" "Any Day Now - Oh Happy Day (Medley)"	— —	— —	112 —	— —	— —	— —	— —	
1971	"Whatever You Say" "Sleeping Man"	— —	— —	— —	— —	— —	— —	— —	
1972	"Walk On Don't Look Back" "Sun Country"	— —	— —	— —	— —	— —	— —	— —	
1973	"How Come?" "Life and Breath"	— —	— —	— —	— —	— —	— —	— —	
1974	"Hickory" "Charisma"	— —	90 —	99 —	— —	— —	85 —	— —	
1975	"The Night" "When the Morning Comes"	— —	— —	— —	— —	— —	— —	7 —	BPI: Silver
1975	"Touch the Rainchild" "Poor Fool"	— —	— —	— —	— —	— —	— —	— —	
1975	"Who Loves You" "Who Loves You (Disco version)"	3 —	7 —	5 —	7 —	16 —	17 —	6 —	
1975	"December, 1963 (Oh, What a Night)" "Slip Away"	1 —	1 —	1 —	18 —	2 —	1 —	1 —	US: Gold; BPI: Platinum; RMNZ: 4× Platinum
1976	"Silver Star" "Mystic Mr. Sam"	38 —	68 —	95 —	24 —	84 —	45 —	3 —	
1976	"We Can Work It Out" "Harmony, Perfect Harmony"	— —	— —	— —	— —	— —	— —	34 —	
1977	"Rhapsody" "Helicon"	— —	— —	— —	— —	— —	— —	37 —	
1977	"Down the Hall" "I Believe in You"	65 —	77 —	77 —	40 —	— —	69 —	34 —	
"—" denotes releases that did not chart or were not released in that territory.

==== 1980s–1994 ====
Year	Single	Peak chart positions	
Year	Single	US	US AC
1980	"Spend the Night in Love" "Slip Away"	91 —	— —
1981	"Heaven Must Have Sent You (Here in the Night)" "Silver Star"	— —	— —
1984	"East Meets West" (with the Beach Boys) "Rhapsody"	— —	— —
1985	"Streetfighter" "Deep Inside Your Love"	— —	— —
1985	"Moonlight Memories" "What About Tomorrow?"	— —	— —
1986	"Book of Love" "What About Tomorrow?"	— —	— —
1994	"December, 1963 (Oh, What a Night)" (remix version)	14	22
"—" denotes releases that did not chart.

=== Frankie Valli ===
==== Singles released under other names ====
Year	Single	Artist
1953	"My Mother's Eyes" "The Laugh's on Me"	Frankie Valley
1954	"Somebody Else Took Her Home" "Forgive and Forget"	Frankie Valley and the Travelers
1958	"I Go Ape" "If You Care"	Frankie Tyler
1959	"Please Take a Chance" "It May Be Wrong"	Frankie Vally

==== 1965–present ====
Year	Single	Peak chart positions					Certifications
Year	Single	US	US AC	US R&B	US Dance	UK	Certifications
1965	"The Sun Ain't Gonna Shine (Anymore)" "This Is Goodbye"	— —	— —	— —	— —	— —	
1966	"(You're Gonna) Hurt Yourself" "Night Hawk"	39 —	— —	— —	— —	— —	
1966	"You're Ready Now" "Cry for Me"	112 —	— —	— —	— —	11 (Note: Chart position from 1970.) —	
1966	"The Proud One" "Ivy"	68 —	— —	— —	— —	— —	
1967	"Can't Take My Eyes Off You" "The Trouble with Me"	2 —	— —	— —	— —	— —	US: Gold; BPI: Silver; RMNZ: 2× Platinum
1967	"I Make a Fool of Myself" "September Rain (Here Comes the Rain)"	18 —	— —	— —	— —	— —	
1967	"To Give (The Reason I Live)" "Watch Where You Walk"	29 —	— —	— —	— —	— —	
1970	"You've Got Your Troubles (I've Got Mine)" "A Dream of Kings"	— —	— —	— —	— —	— —	
1970	"Circles in the Sand" "My Mother's Eyes"	— —	— —	— —	— —	— —	
1972	"Love Isn't Here (Like It Used to Be)" "Poor Fool"	— —	— —	— —	— —	— —	
1973	"You've Got Your Troubles" "Listen to Yesterday"	— —	— —	— —	— —	— —	
1973	"The Scalawag Song (And I Will Love You)" "Listen to Yesterday"	— —	— —	— —	— —	— —	
1974	"My Eyes Adored You" "Watch Where You Walk"	1 —	2 —	— —	— —	5 —	US: Gold; BPI: Silver; RMNZ: Gold
1975	"Swearin' to God" "Why"	6 —	— —	31 —	4 —	31 —	
1975	"Boomerang" "Can't Get You Off My Mind"	— —	— —	— —	— —	— —	
1975	"Our Day Will Come" "You Can Bet"	11 —	2 —	— —	15 —	— —	
1976	"Fallen Angel" "Carrie (I Would Marry You)"	36 —	— —	— —	— —	11 —	
1976	"We're All Alone" "You to Me Are Everything"	78 —	— —	— —	— —	— —	
1977	"Easily" "What Good Am I Without You"	— —	— —	— —	— —	— —	
1977	"Second Thoughts" "So She Says"	— —	— —	— —	— —	— —	
1977	"I Need You" "I'm Gonna Love You"	— —	— —	— —	— —	— —	
1977	"Rainstorm" "I Could Have Loved You"	— —	— —	— —	— —	— —	
1978	"Grease" "Grease (Instrumental)"	1 —	— —	40 —	— —	3 —	US: Platinum; BPI: Gold; RMNZ: Platinum
1978	"Save Me, Save Me" "No Love at All"	— —	— —	— —	— —	— —	
1979	"Fancy Dancer" "Needing You"	77 —	— —	— —	— —	— —	
1980	"Where Did We Go Wrong" "Doctor Dance"	90 —	4 —	— —	— —	— —	
1981	"Soul" "If It Really Wasn't Love"	— —	— —	— —	11 —	— —	
1982	"You Make It Beautiful" (duet with Cheryl Ladd) "Can't Say No To You"	— —	— —	— —	— —	— —	
1997	"Can't Take My Eyes Off You" (duet with Mary Griffin)	—	—	—	—	—	
2016	"Merry Christmas, Baby" (with Jeff Beck)	—	—	—	—	—	
2020	"Te Quiero Baby (I Love You Baby)" (with Chesca and Pitbull)	—	—	—	—	—	
2020	"Goodbyes" (SNSE with Frankie Valli)	—	—	—	—	—	
2021	"How High the Moon"	—	—	—	—	—	
2021	"We'll Be Together Again"	—	—	—	—	—	
"—" denotes releases that did not chart.

== Other appearances ==
=== Topix/Perri releases ===
(Two independent labels owned by Bob Crewe and distributed by London. Tommy DeVito, Bob Gaudio, Nick Massi and Frankie Valli provided, together and separately, instrumental backing and background vocals for a variety of artists. Occasionally, they would be given performing credit under different names)

Year	Single	Artist	Label	Product number
1961	"Too Young to Start" / "Red Lips"	Village Voices	Topix	45-6000
1961	"Ten Million Tears" / "Spanish Lace"	Turner DeSentri (Bob Gaudio)	Topix	45-6001-V
1961	"Trance" / "I Am All Alone"	Billy Dixon & The Topics	Topix	45-6002
1961	"An Angel Cried" / "Hope, Faith, and Dreams"	Hal Miller & The Rays	Topix	45-6003
1961	"Betty Jean" / "More Lovin' Less Talkin'"	Johnny Halo	Topix	45-6004
1961	"Lollypops Went out of Styles" / "Cry Myself to Sleep"	Matthew Reid	Topix	45-6006
1961	"Little Pony" / {blank}	Alex Alda (Nick Massi)	Topix	45-6007
1962	"Trance" / "Lost Lullabye"	Billy Dixon & The Topics	Topix	45-6008
1962	"Are You Happy Now?" / "Bright Brown Eyes"	The Rays	Perri	1004
1962	"The Girl in My Dreams" / {blank}	The Topics	Perri	1007

=== Miss Frankie Nolan ===
(background vocals by The 4 Seasons)

Year	Single	Label	Product number
06/1961	"I Wish It Were Summer All Year Round" / "I Still Care"	ABC-Paramount	10231
?/1961	"Say No More" / "A Week From Sunday"	ABC-Paramount	151
