= The Four Seasons Story =

Compilation album by The Four Seasons
- Released: 1976
- Length: 1:18:17
- Label: Private Stock Records
- Producer: Bob Crewe

The Four Seasons chronology
Who Loves You (1975)	The Four Seasons Story (1976)	Helicon (1977)

The Four Seasons Story is a two-record compilation of The Four Seasons's biggest hit singles from 1962 to 1969. It was released in 1976 on the Private Stock label. It quickly became a gold record, selling over one million copies before the RIAA started awarding platinum records for million-selling albums (1976). It reached #31 in Canada, January 31, 1976.

== Track listing (Length/Production Year/Chart Position) ==
Side 1

1. "Sherry" (Bob Gaudio) – 2:30 (1962 / #1)
2. "Big Girls Don’t Cry" (Bob Crewe/Bob Gaudio) – 2:25 (1962 / #1)
3. "Walk Like a Man" (Bob Crewe/Bob Gaudio) – 2:21 (1963 / #1)
4. "Stay" (Maurice Williams) – 1:58 (1963 / #16)
5. "Marlena" (Bob Gaudio) – 2:32 (1963 / #36)
6. "Don’t Think Twice" (Bob Dylan) – 2:59 (1966 / #12)
7. "Candy Girl" (Larry Santos) – 2:40 (1963 / #3)

Side 2

1. "Dawn" (Bob Gaudio/Sandy Linzer) – 2:11 (1964 / #3)
2. "C'mon Marianne" (L. Russell Brown/Raymond Bloodworth) - 2:23 (1967 / #9)
3. "Opus 17 (Don't You Worry 'bout Me)" (Denny Randell/Sandy Linzer) – 2:33 (1966 / #13)
4. "Workin’ My Way Back to You" (Denny Randell/Sandy Linzer) – 2:51 (1965 / #9)
5. "Let's Hang On" [Bob Crewe/Denny Randell/Sandy Linzer) – 3:09 (1965 / #3)
6. "Ronnie" (Bob Crewe/Bob Gaudio) – 2:25 (1964 / #6)
7. "Bye, Bye, Baby (Baby Goodbye)" (Bob Crewe/Bob Gaudio) – 2:32 (1964 / #12)

Side 3

1. "Rag Doll" (Bob Crewe/Bob Gaudio) – 3:00 (1964 / #1)
2. "Beggin'" (Bob Gaudio/Peggy Farina) - 3:48 (1967 / #16)
3. "Silence Is Golden" (Bob Crewe/Bob Gaudio) – 3:03 (1964)
4. "I've Got You Under My Skin" (Cole Porter) – 3:37 (1966 / #9)
5. "Save It for Me" (Bob Crewe/Bob Gaudio) – 2:37 (1964 / #10)
6. "Big Man in Town" (Bob Gaudio) – 2:47 (1965 / #20)
7. "Will You Still Love Me (Tomorrow)" (Gerry Goffin/Carole King) – 2:32 (1968 / #24)

Side 4

1. "And That Reminds Me" (Al Stillman/Camillo Bargoni) – 3:31 (1969 / #45)
2. "Electric Stories" (Mike Petrillo/Sandy Linzer) – 3:05 (1968 / #61)
3. "Watch the Flowers Grow" (L. Russell Brown/Raymond Bloodworth) – 3:33 (1967 / #30)
4. "Tell It to the Rain" (Mike Petrillo/Chubby Cifelli) – 2:30 (1966 / #10)
5. "Ain't That a Shame" (Fats Domino/Dave Bartholomew) – 2:37 (1963 / #22)
6. "Toy Soldier" (Bob Crewe/Bob Gaudio) – 2:37 (1965 / #64)
7. "Alone" (Selma Craft/Morty Craft) – 2:32 (1964 / #28)
- The production year for track 1 on side 4 was given as 1976 on the record label but was #45 in the charts in 1969.

== Production ==
- Arrangements and adaptions: Charles Callelo, Nick Massi, Denny Randell and Bob Gaudio
- Producer: Bob Crewe
- Album photography: Dean Cade
- Album design and illustration: Vigon, Nahas, Vigon

== Certifications ==
Region	Certification	Certified units/sales
Australia (ARIA)	Gold	20,000^{^}
South Africa (RISA)	Gold	25,000^{*}
^{*} Sales figures based on certification alone.^{^} Shipments figures based on certification alone.
