= The Very Best of Frankie Valli & the Four Seasons =

Greatest hits album by Frankie Valli & the Four Seasons
- Released: 2002
- Label: Rhino

The Very Best of Frankie Valli & the Four Seasons is a 2002 compilation album featuring music from Frankie Valli during both his time fronting the Four Seasons and his solo career. It was released by Rhino Records. In June 2012, the album went number one in New Zealand and was certified Platinum. It has also sold over 500,000 copies in the US.

== Track listing ==
1. "Sherry"
2. "Big Girls Don't Cry"
3. "Walk Like a Man"
4. "Candy Girl"
5. "Dawn (Go Away)"
6. "Ronnie"
7. "Rag Doll"
8. "Save It for Me"
9. "Bye, Bye, Baby (Baby, Goodbye)"
10. "Let's Hang On!"
11. "Working My Way Back to You"
12. "Opus 17 (Don't You Worry 'Bout Me)"
13. "I've Got You Under My Skin"
14. "C'mon Marianne"
15. "Can't Take My Eyes Off You" - Frankie Valli
16. "My Eyes Adored You" - Frankie Valli
17. "Swearin' to God" (Single Version) - Frankie Valli
18. "Who Loves You"
19. "December, 1963 (Oh, What a Night)"
20. "Grease" - Frankie Valli
