= Golden Hits of the Four Seasons =

Greatest hits album by the Four Seasons
- Released: 1963
- Length: 29:52
- Label: Vee-Jay
- Producer: Bob Crewe

The Four Seasons chronology
The 4 Seasons Sing Ain't That a Shame and 11 Others (1963)	Golden Hits of the Four Seasons (1963)	Folk-Nanny (1964)

Golden Hits of the Four Seasons is an LP album by the Four Seasons, released by Vee-Jay Records under catalog number LP-1065 as a monophonic recording in 1963, and later in stereo under catalog number SR-1065 the same year. It reached number 15 on the Billboard 200. The album features seven tracks that charted on the US pop chart, six of which within the top 40 and three number-one singles. In 1964, the album was repackaged as The Beatles vs the Four Seasons in a double-LP set with Vee-Jay's Introducing... the Beatles. This version charted at number 142.

== Track listing ==
Side one
No.	Title	Writer(s)	Original album	Length
1.	"Sherry"	Bob Gaudio	Sherry & 11 Others	2:21
2.	"I've Cried Before"	Gaudio		2:21
3.	"Marlena"	Gaudio	The 4 Seasons Sing Ain't That a Shame and 11 Others	2:32
4.	"Soon (I'll Be Home Again)"	Bob Crewe; Gaudio	The 4 Seasons Sing Ain't That a Shame and 11 Others	2:26
5.	"Ain't That a Shame"	Fats Domino; Dave Bartholomew	The 4 Seasons Sing Ain't That a Shame and 11 Others	2:33
6.	"Walk Like a Man"	Crewe; Gaudio	Big Girls Don't Cry and Twelve Others...	2:11

Side two
No.	Title	Writer(s)	Original album	Length
1.	"Connie-O"	Crewe; Gaudio		2:29
2.	""Big Girls Don't Cry""	Crewe; Gaudio	Sherry & 11 Others	2:25
3.	"Starmaker"	Crewe		2:40
4.	"Candy Girl"	Larry Santos	The 4 Seasons Sing Ain't That a Shame and 11 Others	2:40
5.	"Silver Wings"	Crewe		2:35
6.	"Peanuts"	J. Lawrence Cook	Sherry & 11 Others	2:30

== Personnel ==
- Nick Massi – vocal arrangements
- Charlie Calello, Sid Bass – orchestral arrangements
- Charlie Calello – conductor
- Gordon Clark – engineer

== Charts ==
Singles - Billboard (United States)

Year	Single	Chart	Position
1962	"Sherry"	The Billboard Hot 100	1
1962	"Big Girls Don't Cry"	The Billboard Hot 100	1
1963	"Walk Like a Man"	The Billboard Hot 100	1
1963	"Ain't That a Shame"	The Billboard Hot 100	22
1963	"Soon (I'll Be Home Again)"	The Billboard Hot 100	77
1963	"Candy Girl"	The Billboard Hot 100	3
1963	"Marlena"	The Billboard Hot 100	36
