= Angelo Cifelli =

American singer and composer (born 1939)

Angelo M. "Chubby" Cifelli (born March 27, 1939) is an American, singer, composer, and guitarist who grew up in Harrison, New Jersey. As a musician he performed and wrote songs for Frankie Valli and The Four Seasons.

He first learned guitar in 1956 from Tommy DeVito. Together with other students from Barringer High School, he joined the Tradewinds in 1959 and the group had a hit single with "Furry Murray". The group performed on Dick Clark's American Bandstand to promote the release of the single.

== Songwriting ==
In the early 1960s, Cifelli teamed up with Mike Petrillo of Belleville. They were introduced to each other by Frankie Valli. Petrillo is an accomplished tenor saxophonist and plays solo sax lead on "Opus 17 (Don't You Worry 'bout Me)" by Valli and the Four Seasons.

In 1967, Cifelli and Petrillo co-wrote "Tell It to the Rain", a hit for Frankie Valli and the Four Seasons which reached number 10 on the Billboard Hot 100. The duo also wrote several other songs for Frankie Valli and the Four Seasons including "Fox in the Bush", "Expression of Love", "Patch of Blue", and "I'm Gonna Change". In 2003, Joe Pesci recorded "Fox In The Bush".
