= New Mexican Rose =

Single by The Four Seasons

from the album Ain't That a Shame and 11 Others
- B-side: "That's the Only Way (from the same album)"
- Released: September 1963
- Genre: Rock
- Length: 2:45
- Label: Vee-Jay Records
- Songwriter(s): Bob Crewe; Charles Calello
- Producer(s): Bob Crewe

The Four Seasons singles chronology
"Candy Girl" (1963)	"New Mexican Rose" (1963)	"Peanuts" (1964)

"New Mexican Rose" is a song by the American rock band The Four Seasons. The song was composed by producer Bob Crewe and arranger Charles Calello. While sales did not match that of the singles' predecessors, "New Mexican Rose" did make it into the Top 40 of Billboard's Hot 100 singles chart, reaching a peak position of #36 in November 1963.

Cash Box described it as a "cha cha paced" song that is "filled with the vocal and instrumental tricks that the kids love."

The B-side of the single was "That's the Only Way", written by Crewe and Robert Boulanger. It attracted some airplay on its own, reaching #88 on the Hot 100.

The record was released at a time in which a Vee-Jay management shakeup triggered a sequence of events which involved accusations by The Four Seasons involving the label's purporting to withhold royalties from record sales and Vee-Jay's accusing The Four Seasons of breach of contract (as they were starting to stockpile song recordings - such as "Dawn (Go Away)" - and withholding them from release by the record company). In the interim, Vee-Jay started repackaging already-released recordings by the group and selling them as "new" albums. While the lawsuit was not to be settled until early 1965, the group officially left Vee-Jay by the end of 1963, and "Dawn" became their first single on Philips Records in January 1964.
