= Working My Way Back to You and More Great New Hits =

Studio album by The Four Seasons
- Released: January 1966
- Studio: Stea-Philips Recording Studio; Olmsted Sound Studio, New York City
- Genre: Rock; pop rock
- Label: Philips
- Producer: Bob Crewe

The Four Seasons chronology
All New Recorded Live • On Stage with The 4 Seasons (1965)	Working My Way Back to You and More Great New Hits (1966)	New Gold Hits (1967)

Working My Way Back to You and More Great New Hits is a 1966 album by The Four Seasons. Released in January of that year, the album is within the pop/rock genre. It included the top ten hit "Working My Way Back to You".

== Development ==
This album was "rush-released", including three tracks that had previously been included in the group's previous album entitled The 4 Seasons Entertain You. It included the last contributions from bassist Nick Massi, including a rare original composition, his doo-wop ballad "Living Just for You." In Massi's absence, instrumental arranger Charles Calello filled in on bass for the new material and appears on the album cover, affording the band enough time to hire and onboard Massi's successor, Joe Long.

== Critical reception ==
William Ruhlmann of AllMusic felt that the majority of the album's tracks are decent examples of the "Gaudio-Crewe pop formula" and believes that "Everybody Knows My Name" was inspired by the folk-rock wave sound of Bob Dylan. Jeff Kallman, also writing for Allmusic, noted that Massi's "Living Just for You" was a highlight of the album ("the best ballad any member of the group came up with (other than) 'Silence Is Golden'") while noting it was somewhat anachronistic, seeming to fit better with the doo-wop of the 1950s or the Philadelphia soul of the 1970s than the music of its own time.

== Track listing ==
1. "Working My Way Back to You" (Denny Randell, Sandy Linzer)
2. "Pity" (Bob Crewe, Mike Petrillo)
3. "I Woke Up" (Bob Crewe)
4. "Living Just for You" (Nick Massi)
5. "Beggars Parade" (Bob Crewe, Bob Gaudio)
6. "One Clown Cried" (Bob Gaudio, Sandy Linzer)
7. "Can't Get Enough of You Baby" (Denny Randell, Sandy Linzer)
8. "Sundown" (Alan Bernstein, Mike Petrillo)
9. "Too Many Memories" (Bob Crewe, Bob Gaudio)
10. "Show Girl" (Bob Crewe, Bob Gaudio)
11. "Comin' Up in the World" (Bob Crewe, Larry Santos)
12. "Everybody Knows My Name" (Bob Crewe)
