= Morty Craft =

American musician and record producer (1920–2022)

- Born: Morton Irving Craft; August 19, 1920; Brockton, Massachusetts, U.S.
- Died: January 27, 2022 (aged 101) Manhattan, New York, U.S.
- Occupations: Record producer, music executive, distributor, arranger, songwriter

Morton Irving Craft (August 19, 1920 – January 27, 2022) was an American music arranger, songwriter, record producer, business executive, and record label owner.

== Biography ==
Born in Brockton, Massachusetts, Craft's early career was as a saxophonist, clarinettist, and arranger in bands in Boston. After military service in World War II, he worked in New York City in association with record producer and executive Dave Miller. He gained a footing in record production, and in 1953 formed Bruce Records with Monte Bruce and Leo Rogers. Craft produced the label's only significant hit in 1954, with "A Sunday Kind of Love" by the Harptones. The label folded in 1955, and Craft then formed the Melba record label with Ray Maxwell. In 1957, he established Lance Records, and had immediate success with "Alone (Why Must I Be Alone)" by the Shepherd Sisters, which Craft co-wrote with his wife Selma Craft and which reached No. 18 on the Billboard chart. A cover version by Petula Clark reached No.8 on the British singles chart.

When the Shepherd Sisters were signed by Mercury Records, Craft briefly joined the same company as an A&R executive, but left after a few months to join MGM Records as head of single record sales. He concentrated on record promotion rather than production, and his efforts soon resulted in the success of such releases as "Who's Sorry Now" by Connie Francis, "Purple People Eater" by Sheb Wooley, and "It's Only Make Believe" by Conway Twitty. He supervised Tommy Edwards' re-recording of "It's All in the Game", which reached No.1 on the pop chart in 1958, making Edwards the first African-American performer to do so.

Craft left MGM at the start of 1959 and established Warwick Records, a division of United Telefilm. The first release on the label was an instrumental album of Al Jolson songs, Memories of "Jolie", credited to Morty Craft & His Singing Strings. The label released "Crossfire" by Johnny and the Hurricanes, as well as the group's follow-ups, including "Red River Rock" which Craft later claimed was recorded by session musicians rather than the band itself. Craft tried to resuscitate the careers of older R&B stars including Louis Jordan, Roy Milton, Faye Adams, and Percy Mayfield, but with little success except for the re-recording of "Let the Good Times Roll" by Shirley and Lee. He also signed both Paul Simon (as Jerry Landis) and Art Garfunkel (as Artie Garr), but dropped them after a few months. At Warwick, Craft took responsibility for distributing "Wheels" by the String-A-Longs, "Quite A Party" by The Fireballs, and for the jazz album Out of This World, which marked the recording debut of Herbie Hancock. The Warwick label closed in 1962.

Craft remained active in the record business in New York, helping to establish a succession of small levels including Veep and Speed in the 1960s, but with limited commercial success. He continued to live in Manhattan, where he died in 2022 at the age of 101.
