= Robby Robinson (musician) =

- Born: Max Warren Robinson
- Origin: Litchfield, Illinois
- Genres: Pop, jazz, orchestral
- Occupations: Music director, keyboardist
- Instrument: Keyboards
- Years active: 1976–present
- Member of: The Four Seasons
- Website: www.robbyrobinsonmusic.com

Robby Robinson is an American music director, keyboardist, composer, arranger, and producer. He is best known as the music director and keyboardist for Frankie Valli since 1978, and in this capacity has conducted orchestras such as the London Symphony Orchestra at the Royal Albert Hall, the Houston Symphony, the Pacific Symphony, and the National Symphony Orchestra. Robinson is a Hammond USA "family artist".

== Early life and education ==
Robinson is originally from Litchfield, Illinois. He studied piano from age 7, saxophone from age 8, and started playing in rock bands at age 14. He majored in music at Southern Illinois University of Edwardsville. From high school through college, Robinson played in a variety of bands in the Southern Illinois-St. Louis area, after college he toured the US with Phil Driscoll and "Patch & Didi" (with his brother Rex Robinson, Lynn Hamman, and Didi Carr). The Robinson brothers moved to Los Angeles in 1976.

== Career ==
From 1976 to 1978 Robinson played, arranged, and produced with a broad range of musicians such as Liza Minnelli, Tom Jones,Alphonse Mouzon, Buddy Greco, and Les DeMerle. In 1978, at the recommendation of long-time friend Richie Gajate Garcia, Robinson joined Frankie Valli and The Four Seasons, he has been the group's music director, conductor and keyboardist for over 40 years. In some circles, Robinson is known as the Fifth Season.

Robinson founded the annual Christmas concert, Jam for Jesus, in 1991, which is hosted at Bethlehem SCV in Canyon Country, Santa Clarita, California.

In 2017, and in 2019, the Robinson brothers returned to Litchfield to perform in benefit concerts for St. Francis Hospital, the two shows raised a quarter of a million dollars for the small-town hospital.

Date of release	Title	Billboard peak	Label	Role
November 2007	Romancing the '60s	167	Cherry Entertainment/Universal Motown	Associate Producer, Fender Rhodes

== Personal life ==
Robinson lives in California.
