= Sherry & 11 Others =

Studio album by The Four Seasons
- Released: September 1962
- Genre: Doo-wop
- Length: 29:25
- Label: Vee-Jay
- Producer: Bob Crewe

The Four Seasons chronology
Sherry & 11 Others (1962)	The 4 Seasons Greetings (1962)

Singles from Sherry & 11 Others
- 1. "Sherry" Released: August 1962; 2. "Big Girls Don't Cry" Released: October 1962

Professional ratings
Review scores
Source	Rating
AllMusic	3/5 stars
New Record Mirror	5/5 stars

Sherry & 11 Others is the debut album by the Four Seasons, released by Vee-Jay Records under catalog number LP-1053 as a monophonic recording in 1962 and later in stereo under catalog number SR-1053 the same year.

== Track listing ==
No.	Title	Writer(s)	Length
1.	"Big Girls Don't Cry"	Bob Crewe; Bob Gaudio	2:25
2.	"Yes Sir, That's My Baby"	Walter Donaldson; Gus Kahn	2:18
3.	"Peanuts"	J. Lawrence Cook	2:20
4.	"La Dee Dah"	Crewe; Frank Slay	2:32
5.	"Teardrops"	Roy Calhoun; Edwin Charles; Barry Goldner; Helen Stanley	2:12
6.	"Apple of My Eye"	Otis Blackwell	2:15
7.	"Never on Sunday"	Manos Hadjidakis; Billy Towne	2:48
8.	"I Can't Give You Anything But Love"	Dorothy Fields; Jimmy McHugh	2:12
9.	"Girl In My Dreams"	Gaudio; Robin Swenson	2:15
10.	"Oh Carol"	Howard Greenfield; Neil Sedaka	2:24
11.	"Lost Lullabye"	Crewe; Gaudio	2:24
12.	"Sherry"	Gaudio	2:30

== Personnel ==
- Frankie Valli – lead vocals
- Nick Massi – bass guitar, vocal arrangements, bass vocals
- Bob Gaudio – keyboards, tenor vocals
- Tommy DeVito – lead guitar, baritone vocals
