= Shepherd Sisters =

American female vocal quartet

- Also known as: The Sheps
- Origin: Middletown, Ohio, U.S.
- Genres: Traditional pop, rock and roll
- Years active: from the 1950s
- Labels: Melba; Lance; His Master's Voice (UK)
- Past members: Martha Shepherd (deceased); Gayle Shepherd (deceased); Mary Lou Shepherd; Judith Shepherd (deceased)
- Website: Official Shepherd Sisters website (archived)

The Shepherd Sisters (also known as the Sheps) were an American vocal quartet of four sisters born and raised in Middletown, Ohio, United States: Martha (born Martha Jane Shepherd, April 22, 1932 – February 24, 1998), Gayle (born Joyce Gayle Shepherd, May 31, 1936 – May 7, 2018), Mary Lou (born May 19, 1934), and Judith (November 20, 1939 – July 10, 2009) Shepherd.

The sisters were born into a family of eight children, six sisters and two brothers, with Judith being the youngest. In the late 1950s, they appeared on Arthur Godfrey's Talent Scouts. One of their first recordings, "Gone with the Wind" got them a call from Dick Clark. Subsequently, they made many appearances on Clark's American Bandstand.

In New York City, Morty Craft had a song he wanted them to record, "Alone (Why Must I Be Alone)". In 1957, "Alone" would become their biggest hit and their signature song. In the U.S. it reached No. 18 on the Billboard Hot 100 chart; in the UK Singles Chart it made No. 14. Its chart progress may have been hindered by several rival cover versions on both sides of the Atlantic. In all the Shepherd Sisters recorded over thirty songs, many of them on one of Morty Craft's record labels such as Melba and Lance.

Craft also introduced them to the DJ Alan Freed, the man often credited with coining the term "rock and roll." The Shepherd Sisters played the Brooklyn and Manhattan Paramount Theaters and toured with Alan Freed's 'America's Greatest Teenage Recording Stars', along with the Everly Brothers, Paul Anka, Buddy Holly and the Crickets, Frankie Lymon and the Teenagers, Jerry Lee Lewis, Fats Domino, Danny and the Juniors, Lee Andrews and the Hearts, the Twin Tones, Little Joe Dubs, Thurston Harris, Terry Nolan, and Jo Ann Campbell.

Besides rock and roll the Shepherd Sisters were also a stage and cabaret act. They performed at hotels, nightclubs, New York's Apollo Theater, and casinos in Reno and Las Vegas, Nevada. They also sang in the Philippines, Canada, South America, and parts of Europe.

Martha died on February 24, 1998, at the age of 65. Judith died on July 10, 2009, at the age of 69. Gayle died of dementia on May 7, 2018, at the age of 81. As of 2018, Mary Lou Shepherd is the only surviving member of the quartet.

== See also ==
- List of 1950s one-hit wonders in the United States
