= Bill DeLoach =

American musician

Bill DeLoach (born June 19, 1951, in Baltimore, Maryland), is a singer, keyboardist, guitarist, composer, vocal arranger, musical director, and music producer, who was a member of The Four Seasons and the musical director for entertainer Danny Gans.

== Background ==
DeLoach's first break came in 1971 as a member of local Baltimore band Jake. Local singing artist and songwriter Renaud White saw the band at a club and was impressed by them. He was looking for a rhythm section to accompany him on part of a Jackson 5 tour. DeLoach performed on keyboards with White's band, now known as Renaud White and the Contraband.

Late in 1971, friend and Four Seasons guitarist Demetri Callas recommended DeLoach as a replacement for departing keyboard player Al Ruzicka. During his stint with the Seasons, DeLoach he performed on several television shows with the band, singing most of the parts formerly sung by Bob Gaudio, founding member of the Seasons, who had gone on to writing and producing for Motown. DeLoach also had the opportunity to meet and spend time with performers like Felix Cavaliere of The Rascals and with the Bee Gees. These contacts with stars of the 1960s helped to inspire his later projects.

DeLoach also toured with the Seasons, culminating in a performance on March 25, 1973, at the Capitol Theater in Passaic, New Jersey. During the concert, DeLoach could not sing his solo selection, having come down with a suspected case of strep throat. Frankie Valli, lead singer of the Four Seasons, became very angry backstage and subsequently fired not only DeLoach, but also several other band members and the band's manager. Because of the timing of DeLoach's tenure, he never performed on any of the Seasons' records, a situation he likened to Pete Best's tenure with The Beatles in that, if he had lasted two years longer, he would have had a much more prominent place on the Seasons' comeback records. Although this first stint with the Seasons did not end well, DeLoach went on to appear with the band for two additional tours over the next 30 years.

After continuing to perform in various Las Vegas show bands, DeLoach got the opportunity to be a substitute in the band backing singer, comedian, and impressionist, Danny Gans at The Rio hotel in Las Vegas, before he joined the band permanently when it moved into the theater built for Gans at The Mirage. DeLoach provided backing vocals and played the keyboards in Gans' shows, following Gans to his final showroom at the Encore Theater at the Wynn, in February 2009. Gans died in May 2009.

Following Gans' death, DeLoach and his partner, singer Marilyn James, joined fellow Danny Gans band members Raphael Erardy, Fred Champoux, and several other musicians, in a show created by DeLoach called, "Echoes of the 60s". It was a multi-media production that ran for 11 months from 2010 to 2011 at Planet Hollywood. The show covered different phases of the musical scene of the 1960s, from Motown to the Psychedelic era, as well as the British Invasion and Woodstock.

DeLoach and James, along with Ray Allaire, are currently part of an acoustic trio called 3 of a Kind that performs songs by artists ranging from Crosby, Stills, and Nash, Peter, Paul and Mary, The Bee Gees, and The Hollies, among others. They have most recently been performing at Mizuya Lounge, Mandalay Bay Resort and Casino, Las Vegas, Nevada.
