= The Genuine Imitation Life Gazette =

Studio album by the Four Seasons
- Released: January 1969
- Genre: Psychedelia
- Length: 44:50
- Label: Philips
- Producer: Bob Crewe, Joe Long

The Four Seasons chronology
New Gold Hits (1967)	The Genuine Imitation Life Gazette (1969)	Half & Half (1970)

The Genuine Imitation Life Gazette is a 1969 album by American rock band the Four Seasons. Member Bob Gaudio teamed up with Jake Holmes to create a psychedelic concept album which adjusted the band's stylings to the changing times of the late 1960s. Instead of love songs, the band tackled subjects such as war and racial tension.

The album's packaging was also distinctive, with the cover stylized as a newspaper and the sleeve containing an eight-page newspaper-like insert that also had specially done color underground comics strips by Skip Williamson and Jay Lynch.

The first single issued seven months before the album's release (June 1968) was "Saturday's Father" (Philips 40542), backed with the track "Good-bye Girl". It bubbled under at number 103 on the Billboard Hot 100. A second single with both sides culled from the album, "Idaho" and "Something's on Her Mind", was released in March 1969 as Philips 40597. Both sides crept into the Billboard Hot 100, at number 95 and number 98, respectively.

== Critical reception ==
Professional ratings
Review scores
Source	Rating
AllMusic	4/5 stars

In a review for AllMusic, Donald A. Guarisco says the album "lives up to its reputation as the most bizarre album in the Four Seasons' catalog", describing it as "a concept album that casts a satirical eye on American life". He calls it "relentlessly inventive, skillfully constructed, and never dull" and "a stunning example of the artistry of the Four Seasons at their most ambitious". Richie Unterberger wrote of its contemporary reception that it was "usually met with derisive snickers from the few that heard it."

The Dangerous Minds web site reports that at a 1970s dinner party Gaudio was told by John Lennon that Genuine Imitation Life Gazette was one of his favorite albums. The same site says that after Frank Sinatra heard the album he hired Gaudio and Holmes to create his album Watertown, on which Valli also assisted.

Joe Long, who was credited as co-producer on the album, considered it his favorite album of the ones he recorded with the Four Seasons. Valli, who initially did not want to record the album and anticipated it would be a career mistake, has also grown to appreciate the record for its uniqueness and the cult following it has earned. Tommy DeVito was adamantly against recording the record and quit the band not long after its release, stating that he had "had it" with the band.

== Track listing ==
All tracks written by Bob Gaudio and Jake Holmes, except as noted.

1. "American Crucifixion Resurrection" — 6:50
2. "Mrs. Stately's Garden" — 3:15
3. "Look Up Look Over" — 4:42
4. "Something's on Her Mind" — 2:49
5. "Saturday's Father" — 3:14
6. "Wall Street Village Day" — 4:27
7. "Genuine Imitation Life" (Jake Holmes) — 6:16
8. "Idaho" — 3:02
9. "Wonder What You'll Be" — 3:31
10. "Soul of a Woman" — 7:14

== Personnel ==
Partial credits from AllMusic.

The Four Seasons

- Frankie Valli – vocals
- Tommy DeVito – lead guitar, vocals
- Bob Gaudio – vocals, keyboards, piano, arrangements
- Joe Long – vocals, bass, assistant music editor

Additional musicians

- Charles Calello – arrangements, conductor
- John Holmes – percussion, hi-hat
- Joseph Cassiere (a.k.a. Joey Cass) – drums
- Vincent Corrao – guitar
- Anthony De Angelis – woodwind
- Richard Natoli – woodwind
- Salvatore Piccolo – trumpet
- Emmanuel Green – concertmaster

Production staff

- Bob Crewe – producer
- Roy Cicala – engineer
- Shelly Yakus – assistant engineer
- Frank Scrsggi – coordinating producer
- Bob Ludwig – mastering
- Don Snyder – design, photography
- Desmond Strobel – graphics
