= Big Man in Town =

Single by The Four Seasons

from the album The Four Seasons Entertain You
- B-side: "Little Angel (from the same album)"
- Released: October 1964
- Recorded: 1964
- Genre: Pop
- Length: 2:46
- Label: Philips
- Songwriter(s): Bob Gaudio
- Producer(s): Bob Crewe

The Four Seasons singles chronology
"You're the Apple of My Eye" (1964)	"Big Man in Town" (1964)	"I Saw Mommy Kissing Santa Claus" (1964)

"Big Man in Town" is a song popularized by The Four Seasons and written by Four Seasons member Bob Gaudio. The single was released by Philips Records in October 1964 and reached the #20 position on the Billboard Hot 100 chart.

"Big Man in Town" was released at a time in which Four Seasons material was being issued on an almost-weekly basis, between releases on Philips Records under their group name and reissues on the group's former label Vee-Jay. The rate of releases would be soon to increase as — with the blessing of Philips Records executives — lead singer Frankie Valli would be rekindling a long-dormant "solo" career with the rest of the group as backing musicians. The song is also featured in the Tony Award-winning musical Jersey Boys.

This is one of the few Four Seasons songs that does not end on a fade.

Billboard described the song as having a "good teen lyric with big sound." Cash Box described it as having "a haunting 'Rag Doll'-like opener" and said that it "moves along in ultra commercial stomper cha cha fashion."
