= Nick Massi =

American musician (1927–2000)

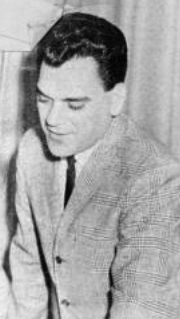
- Massi in 1963

Background information
- Born: Nicholas E. Macioci; September 19, 1927; Newark, New Jersey, U.S.
- Died: December 24, 2000 (aged 73) West Orange, New Jersey, U.S.
- Genres: Rock, pop
- Occupation: Musician
- Instruments: Bass guitar, Vocals
- Years active: 1950−1999
- Formerly of: The Four Seasons
- Website: nickmassiart.com

Nicholas E. Macioci (September 19, 1927 – December 24, 2000) was an American bass singer, songwriter, and bass guitarist. He is best known for his work as the bassist and bass vocalist for The Four Seasons, for whom he performed under the stage name Nick Massi.

== Early life ==
Born in Newark, New Jersey, Nicholas "Massi" Macioci was first taught to play the bass fiddle by Newark native and musician Anthony Gaeta. Massi was called up for service by the United States Army and was based in Japan.

== Career ==
=== The Four Seasons ===
As a bass singer, Massi had been playing with several bands before he joined The Four Lovers in 1958, including some groups that featured future Four Lovers and Four Seasons members Frankie Valli and Tommy DeVito. Valli credited Macioci as one of his most influential early mentors in the music business. In October 1959, Macioci, by this point billed as "Nickie Massey," was signed to Brunswick Records as frontman for the Nite-Lites; he recorded one single, the self-composed "Tell Me You Care," which received a positive review in Cashbox but eventually failed to chart. During his time fronting the Nite-Lites, he and his eventual Four Seasons successor Joe Long played in neighboring clubs with their respective bands, and Long recalled that he and Massey had spent time together on the New Jersey beaches practicing their craft for onlooking women.

After Massi rejoined DeVito and Valli (who by this point were joined by keyboardist Bob Gaudio), the group evolved into the Four Seasons. They performed such hits as "Sherry," "Dawn (Go Away)," and "Rag Doll," the last of which was Massi's personal favorite of his work with the group. He was responsible for most of the group's vocal arrangements and wrote at least one song, the doo-wop style ballad "Living Just for You," for the group's Working My Way Back to You album. He took a scientific, open harmony approach to his arrangements that differed from the improvisational style of doo-wop groups before him. Growing tired of touring, Massi left the Four Seasons in September 1965; Charles Calello filled in for Massi for the band's subsequent album and tour dates before Long, whom Massi had reputedly recommended as his successor, was hired.

In December 1966, he and Four Seasons member Bob Gaudio filed a $6 million lawsuit in Supreme Court of the United States against Premier and Coronet Records for allegedly using the Four Seasons' name and likeness in an album released by Coronet, distributed under the title "At the Hop", an album that had been released in 1962; the unauthorized album had used Four Lovers material on which neither Gaudio nor Massi had appeared.

Much like his successor Joe Long, Massi had occasional reunions with the band after his departure, most prominently for a stretch in the 1970s that included a session that yielded the hit record "My Eyes Adored You" and the minor hit "Hickory."

=== Later career ===
Following his departure from the Four Seasons, he continued to operate Vito-Mass Productions, a production company that primarily focused on local New Jersey musical acts. He had a longstanding desire to front his own group, a factor in his departure from the Four Seasons, a running joke throughout the biographical jukebox musical Jersey Boys, and a desire that, other than occasional singles on small independent labels, never materialized.

Nick worked as a manager, and worked with groups including The Baby Toys, The Victorians and The Carmel. He also arranged records and taught vocal lessons.

== Personal life ==
Nick met his wife, Margaret Ann Mengel, when he was fourteen. They started dating when he was sixteen and in 1949, they got married. The marriage remained until Massi's death. They had three children, Robert "Bobby" Macioci, Nick Macioci Jr. and Patricia "Patti" Massi-Candeliere. Margaret Macioci died in 2022.

For the last thirty years of his life, he and his family lived in West Orange, New Jersey.

In his latter years, Macioci, reverting to his birth surname, took up painting as a hobby; his daughter Patti has published many of his paintings online, consisting of a broad variety of styles but most commonly featuring portraits of celebrities and figures associated with his Catholic faith.

=== Jersey Boys ===
He was made aware of plans to make Jersey Boys in the earliest stages and gave his approval to go ahead with the production before his death; his family eventually gave its strong support, with his widow describing it as her favorite musical. Valli and Gaudio ensured that the Massi family were paid an equal share of the profits from Jersey Boys as the other three members received; his son Nick Jr. claimed that DeVito used the contract to take a share four times as large as the Massi family received and that while Margie received a royalty (the size of which was in dispute), the children received nothing, which led to tensions when Nick Jr. resorted to scalping and aggressive behavior at Jersey Boys shows in an effort to provide for his daughter.

== Death ==
Massi died of liver cancer on December 24, 2000, allegedly brought on by "alcoholism and other demons," at his home in West Orange, New Jersey. He spent the later years of his life as a recluse; according to Nick Jr., his father was estranged from his mother at the time of his death, living in the basement of their family home in "an igloo" and living off a Social Security pension.

Frankie Valli told The Star-Ledger upon his death: "He could do four-part modern harmonies that would amaze musicians who had studied for years. And he did it all in his head without writing it down". Bob Crewe, who produced for the Four Seasons, said of Massi: "He was one of the most informed musicians I've ever worked with, with an innate sense of how things worked together."

== Awards ==
Massi, Tommy DeVito, Frankie Valli, and Bob Gaudio—the original members of The Four Seasons—were inducted into the Rock and Roll Hall of Fame in 1990 and the Vocal Group Hall of Fame in 1999. Massi was posthumously recognized in 2017 when DeVito, Valli, Gaudio and Joe Long (Massi's successor) were inducted into the New Jersey Hall of Fame.
