= Girl Come Running =

Single by The Four Seasons

from the album Gold Vault of Hits
- B-side: "Cry Myself to Sleep (from the album Born To Wander)"
- Released: June 1965
- Genre: Pop; blue-eyed soul
- Length: 3:03
- Label: Philips
- Songwriter(s): Bob Gaudio-Bob Crewe
- Producer(s): Bob Crewe

The Four Seasons singles chronology
"Toy Soldier" (1965)	"Girl Come Running" (1965)	"Since I Don't Have You" (1965)

"Girl Come Running" is a song recorded by The Four Seasons and released as a single in 1965. It was composed by group member Bob Gaudio and Bob Crewe. Considered a "minor hit" for the group in context of their string of records reaching the upper levels of the Billboard Hot 100 singles chart, "Girl Come Running" peaked at #30 in July 1965.

Billboard described the single as "powerful production and vocal performance on a good Bob Crewe teen ballad with a driving dance beat in strong support." Cash Box described it as "one of the [Four Seasons'] most dynamic showings."
