= Watch the Flowers Grow =

- US picture sleeve

Single by The Four Seasons

from the album Edizione d'oro (Gold Edition)
- B-side: "Raven (non-LP track)"
- Released: October 1967
- Genre: Psychedelic pop
- Length: 3:11
- Label: Philips
- Songwriter(s): L. Russell Brown-Raymond Bloodworth
- Producer(s): Bob Crewe

The Four Seasons singles chronology
"Lonesome Road (as The Wonder Who?)" (1967)	"Watch the Flowers Grow" (1967)	"Will You Love Me Tomorrow" (1968)

"Watch the Flowers Grow" is a song composed by L. Russell Brown and Raymond Bloodworth and popularized by The Four Seasons in 1967. The single was released in the wake of The Beach Boys' Pet Sounds and The Beatles' Sgt. Pepper's Lonely Hearts Club Band, "Watch the Flowers Grow" struggled up the Billboard Hot 100, peaking at #30, as The Four Seasons' music was rapidly falling out of favor with the American record-buying public (the Four Seasons' next single, a cover of The Shirelles' #1 hit "Will You Love Me Tomorrow" did slightly better, reaching #24 as the last Top 40 Four Seasons hit until "Who Loves You" in 1975).

Billboard described the single as a "timely, easy-beat ballad" that was one of the Four Seasons' "most unusual entries." Cash Box said that it's "gently pulsing, melodic, romp." Bassist Joe Long expressed some embarrassment at the song in hindsight shortly before his death, feeling it to be a poor representation of his work with the Seasons compared to their cover of "I've Got You Under My Skin" and their later album The Genuine Imitation Life Gazette; he recalled that it was recorded at a point of desperation in the band's career.

Songwriter L. Russell Brown would compose (or co-compose) a string of hit records in the 1970s, including several recorded by Dawn featuring Tony Orlando.
