= Tell It to the Rain =

Single by The Four Seasons

from the album New Gold Hits
- B-side: "Show Girl (from the album The 4 Seasons Entertain You)"
- Released: November 1966
- Recorded: November 1966
- Genre: Blue-eyed soul; psychedelic pop
- Length: 2:30
- Label: Philips
- Songwriter: Mike Petrillo-Chubby Cifelli
- Producer: Bob Crewe

The Four Seasons singles chronology
"I've Got You Under My Skin" (1966)	"Tell It to the Rain" (1966)	"Beggin'" (1967)

"Tell It to the Rain" is a song composed by Mike Petrillo and Chubby Cifelli and popularized by The Four Seasons in 1966 and early 1967. The single reached the #10 position on the Billboard Hot 100 singles chart.

The song's arrangement includes a prominent 12-string electric guitar part, as well as sound effects and a crescendo of vocals toward the end.

Cash Box said the single is "loaded with the group’s usual effective sound and infectious arrangement."

== Chart history ==
Chart (1966–67)	Peak position
Canada RPM Top Singles*	60
UK Singles (OCC)	37
U.S. Billboard Hot 100	10
U.S. Cash Box Top 100	12

(* - Canadian RPM chart data incomplete for early 1967)
