= Big Girls Don't Cry (The Four Seasons song) =

1962 single by The Four Seasons

Single by The Four Seasons

from the album Sherry & 11 Others
- B-side: "Connie-O" (non-LP track later included on Golden Hits of the 4 Seasons album)
- Released: October 1962
- Recorded: September 1962
- Studio: Universal Recording (Chicago)
- Genre: Rock and roll; pop; doo-wop
- Length: 2:26
- Label: Vee-Jay
- Songwriters: Bob Crewe, Bob Gaudio
- Producer: Bob Crewe

The Four Seasons singles chronology
"Sherry" (1962)	"Big Girls Don't Cry" (1962)	"Santa Claus Is Coming to Town" (1962)

"Big Girls Don't Cry" is a song written by Bob Crewe and Bob Gaudio and originally recorded by the Four Seasons. It hit number one on the Billboard Hot 100 on November 17, 1962, and like its predecessor "Sherry", spent five weeks in the top position. The song also made it to number one for three weeks, on Billboard's rhythm and blues (R&B) survey. It was also the quartet's second single to make it to number one on the U.S. R&B charts.

== Background ==
According to Gaudio, he was dozing off while watching the John Payne/Rhonda Fleming/Ronald Reagan movie Tennessee's Partner when he heard Payne's character slap Fleming in the face. After the slap, Fleming's character replied, "Big girls don't cry." Gaudio wrote the line on a scrap of paper, fell asleep, and wrote the song the next morning. However, the line does not appear in that film. According to Bob Crewe, he was dozing off in his Manhattan home with the television on when he awoke to see Payne manhandling Fleming in Slightly Scarlet, a 1956 film noir based on a James M. Cain story. The line is heard in that film.

Like "Sherry", the lead in "Big Girls Don't Cry" is sung mostly in falsetto. With this song, the Four Seasons became the first rock-era act to hit the number-one spot on the Hot 100 with their first two chart entries (their first single, "Bermuda"/"Spanish Lace", did not appear on any Billboard chart in 1961).

In 2015, "Big Girls Don't Cry" by the Four Seasons was inducted into the Grammy Hall of Fame.

== Personnel ==
Partial credits

The Four Seasons

- Frankie Valli – lead vocals, handclaps
- Tommy DeVito – harmony and backing vocals, guitar, handclaps
- Nick Massi – counterpoint, harmony and backing vocals, bass, handclaps
- Bob Gaudio – harmony and backing vocals, piano, handclaps

Additional musician and production staff

- Panama Francis – drums
- Bob Crewe – producer
- Bruce Swedien – engineer

The father of co-arranger Charles Calello provides the song's trumpet solo.

== Charts ==
=== Weekly charts ===
Chart (1962–1963)	Peak position
New Zealand (Lever Hit Parade)	1
UK Singles	13
US Billboard Hot 100	1
US Billboard R&B	1

=== All-time charts ===
Chart (2018)	Position
US Billboard Hot 100	183

== Certifications ==
Certifications for "Big Girls Don't Cry"
Region	Certification	Certified units/sales
United Kingdom (BPI)	Silver	200,000^{‡}
^{‡} Sales+streaming figures based on certification alone.
