= Alone (Why Must I Be Alone) =

Single by The Shepherd Sisters
- B-side: "Congratulations to Someone"
- Released: August 1957
- Recorded: 1957
- Genre: Rock and roll
- Length: 2:45
- Label: Lance
- Songwriter(s): Morty Craft-Selma Craft

The Shepherd Sisters singles chronology
"Gone with the Wind" (1956)	"Alone (Why Must I Be Alone)" (1957)

"Alone"

Single by The Four Seasons

from the album More Golden Hits by The Four Seasons
- B-side: "Long, Lonely Nights (from the album Folk-Nanny)"
- Released: May 1964
- Genre: Doo-wop, rock and roll
- Length: 2:49
- Label: Vee-Jay
- Songwriter(s): Morty Craft-Selma Craft
- Producer(s): Bob Crewe

The Four Seasons singles chronology
"Ronnie" (1964)	"Alone" (1964)	"Rag Doll" (1964)

"Alone (Why Must I Be Alone)" is a popular song written by Morty Craft with lyrics written by Craft's wife, Selma.

== Original recordings ==
Craft, who founded Lance Records, produced the recording of "Alone (Why Must I Be Alone)" by The Shepherd Sisters for the label. It was the only hit for The Shepherd Sisters in the United States, reaching No. 18 on the Billboard chart on November 11, 1957. The Shepherd Sisters' version also charted in the United Kingdom, reaching No. 14.

== Four Seasons recording ==
A remake of the song by The Four Seasons charted in 1964, reaching its peak Billboard Hot 100 position at No. 28, on July 18. "Alone (Why Must I Be Alone)" also went to No. 8 on the Canadian singles chart. It was the act's last hit single on Vee Jay Records, as The Four Seasons had already left the label at the beginning of 1964 in a royalty dispute.

== Cover versions ==
- "Alone" was one of a number of hits for Petula Clark, reaching No. 8 on the UK Singles Chart, before she became famous internationally.
- The song was also subsequently recorded by Tracey Ullman.
- A 1957, version by The Southlanders, reached No. 17 in the UK.
- Saint Motel sampled the original version in their song "Sisters" which appears on their third album, The Original Motion Picture Soundtrack.
