= The Four Seasons (band) =

American band

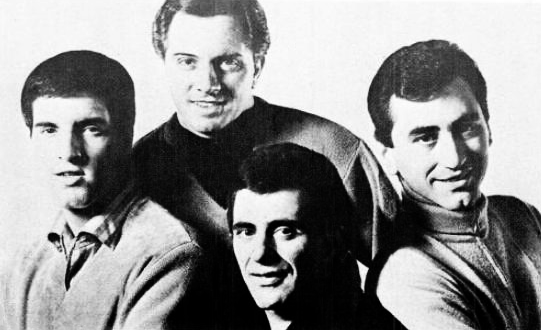
- The Four Seasons in 1966. Top: Tommy DeVito; left: Bob Gaudio; right: Joe Long; bottom: Frankie Valli.

Background information
- Also known as: The Four Lovers (1956–1960); The Wonder Who? (1965–1967)
- Origin: Newark, New Jersey, U.S.
- Genres: Pop rock; pop; soul; doo-wop; rock and roll
- Years active: 1953–1977; 1979–2026
- Labels: Gone; Vee-Jay; Philips; Mowest; Warner Bros.; MCA; Curb
- Past members: Frankie Valli; Bob Gaudio; Tommy DeVito; Nick Massi; Charles Calello; Joe Long; Demetri Callas; Gerry Polci; Lee Shapiro; John Paiva; Don Ciccone; Larry Lingle; Jerry Corbetta; Robby Robinson; Full list
- Website: FrankieValliFourSeasons.com

The Four Seasons were an American pop and rock band formed in 1960 in Newark, New Jersey. From 1970, they had also been known at times as Frankie Valli and the Four Seasons. They are one of the best-selling musical groups of all time, having sold an estimated 100 million records worldwide.

The Four Seasons were founded in 1960 when singer Frankie Valli and guitarist Tommy DeVito, the two remaining members of the 1950s novelty act The Four Lovers, joined forces with The Royal Teens keyboardist Bob Gaudio and with Valli's friend, bassist Nick Massi. All four were Italian Americans who hailed from the state of New Jersey. Massi and DeVito left the band in 1965 and 1970 respectively, while Gaudio moved to being a studio-only member in 1972; Valli has remained the group's frontman through its most recent performances in 2026. The band's number one singles are "Sherry" (1962), "Big Girls Don’t Cry" (1962), "Walk Like A Man" (1963), "Rag Doll" (1964), and "December, 1963 (Oh, What A Night)" (1976). The Four Seasons are known for their longevity and for Valli's powerful falsetto.

The original lineup of the Four Seasons was inducted into the Rock and Roll Hall of Fame in 1990, the Vocal Group Hall of Fame in 1999, and the New Jersey Hall of Fame in 2017. The Hollywood Walk of Fame awarded a star, jointly credited to Valli and to the group, in 2024.

== History ==
=== 1953–1960: Before the Four Seasons ===
In 1954, Frankie Valli, who had already had a minor hit with his cover of "My Mother's Eyes" a year prior, joined Tommy DeVito's Variety Trio to form The Variatones, a group that rebranded as the Four Lovers, based upon a Latin lover gimmick, in 1956. The band released several singles, the only successful one being "You're the Apple of My Eye" (1956), which peaked at No. 62.

In 1959, DeVito revamped the Four Lovers, leaving only himself and Valli. Bob Gaudio left The Royal Teens and became the group's keyboardist. In 1960, Nick Massi--at the time, frontman for the Nite-Lites and a mentor of Valli's who had occasionally played with Valli and DeVito throughout the 1950s--joined the band, which by this point was performing and recording under several aliases. In 1960, the quartet failed an audition for a lounge at a Union Township, Union County, New Jersey bowling establishment. According to Gaudio, "We figured we'll come out of this with something. So we took the name of the bowling alley. It was called the Four Seasons."

=== 1961–1963: Rise ===
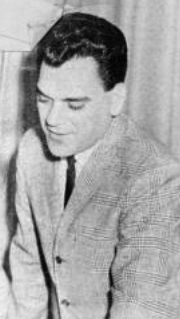
Nick Massi was the Four Seasons' bassist from 1960 to 1965, and briefly returned in 1973. He featured prominently on countermelodies during his tenure.

The Four Seasons signed as artists to Crewe's production company, and they released their first Crewe-produced single under their new name in 1961 ("Bermuda"/"Spanish Lace" on Gone Records); the non-charting record would be their only record for Gone, which was itself gone by July 1962 when Morris Levy bought and dissolved the label. The band continued working with producer Bob Crewe as background vocalists and sometimes leads under different names, for productions on Crewe's own Topix label. As a follow-up, Bob Gaudio wrote a song that, after some discussion between Crewe and Gaudio, was titled "Sherry". After the song was recorded, Crewe and the members of the band solicited record labels to release it. It was Frankie Valli who spoke with Randy Wood, West Coast sales manager for Vee-Jay Records (not the founder of Dot Records) who, in turn, suggested the release of "Sherry" to the decision-makers at Vee-Jay. "Sherry" made enough of an impression that Crewe was able to sign a deal between his production company and Vee-Jay for its release. They were the first white artists to sign with Vee-Jay.

In 1962, the band released their first album, featuring the single "Sherry", which drew the attention of WPOP in Hartford, Connecticut, known for launching new hit songs; WPOP disc jockey Joey Reynolds heavily promoted the record. "Sherry" gave the Four Seasons their first No. 1 song. Under the guidance of Bob Crewe, the Four Seasons followed up "Sherry" with several million-selling singles, generally composed by Crewe and Gaudio, including "Big Girls Don't Cry" (their second No. 1 hit), "Walk Like a Man" (their third No. 1), "Candy Girl" (written by Larry Santos), "Ain't That a Shame", and several others. Also, they released a Christmas album in December 1962 and charted with a unique rendition of "Santa Claus Is Coming to Town".

From 1962 to early 1964, the Beach Boys were the only band to match the Four Seasons in record sales in the United States, and their first three Vee-Jay non-holiday single releases (i.e., ignoring their version of "Santa Claus Is Coming to Town") marked the first time that a rock band hit No. 1 on the Billboard singles charts with three consecutive entries. The band was purposely marketed as clean-cut Italian boys, even shaving several years off the ages of most of the members' ages, in contrast to the greaser style of many of the rock and roll acts of the era, and deliberately hid some of the members' criminal pasts (particularly DeVito, who had a sizable rap sheet of petty crimes). Their traditional stylings combined with a songwriting style that appealed to lovelorn younger listeners and a musical sound that was both ethnically and stylistically ambiguous—its fusion of rhythm & blues, rock & roll, and doo-wop made some listeners mistakenly believe the quartet was black—gave them a broad, all-ages appeal.

In 1962, they were invited to perform their hit "Big Girls Don't Cry" on the show American Bandstand.

=== 1964: From Vee-Jay to Philips ===
In January 1964, after several successful albums but a lack of money from Vee-Jay, the Seasons left Vee-Jay and moved to Philips Records, then a division of Mercury Records. In the 1965 settlement of a lawsuit between the two parties, Vee-Jay retained release rights for all material the band recorded for the label. Vee-Jay exercised those rights liberally over the following year. The group was obligated to deliver one final album to Vee-Jay, which they did in the form of a faux "live" LP. At the same time, Vee-Jay was overwhelmed when it found itself as the rightsholder not only to the Four Seasons, but the Beatles, which it had acquired in a sidecar deal with Frank Ifield in 1962; unable to meet demand for both bands, and with the Beatles' rights eventually reverting to Capitol Records in October 1964 after another protracted legal battle, Vee-Jay was finally declared bankrupt in 1966. With the bankruptcy, the Four Seasons' Vee-Jay catalog reverted to the band, who promptly licensed the rights to Philips.

The change of label did not diminish the popularity of the Four Seasons in 1964, nor did the onslaught of the British Invasion and Beatlemania. However, "Dawn (Go Away)" was kept from the No. 1 spot on the Hot 100 by no fewer than three Beatles singles in the March 21, 1964, edition (two weeks later, the top five slots were filled by Beatles singles). In a two-record set dubbed The Beatles vs the Four Seasons: The International Battle of the Century!, Vee-Jay created an elaborate two-disc package that the purchaser could use to write on and score individual recordings by their favorite artist. The discs were reissues of the albums Introducing... The Beatles and Golden Hits of the Four Seasons, featuring each original album's label, title, and catalog number. Today, this album package is a collector's item. Valli credited the band's continued success in the face of the British Invasion to staying true to their original mission of an original sound and not trying to imitate British acts. The summer of 1964 saw the Seasons achieve their fourth US No. 1 single with "Rag Doll", which also became their biggest hit in the UK to that point, reaching No. 2 there.

=== 1965–1968: Departure of Nick Massi; One band, several acts ===
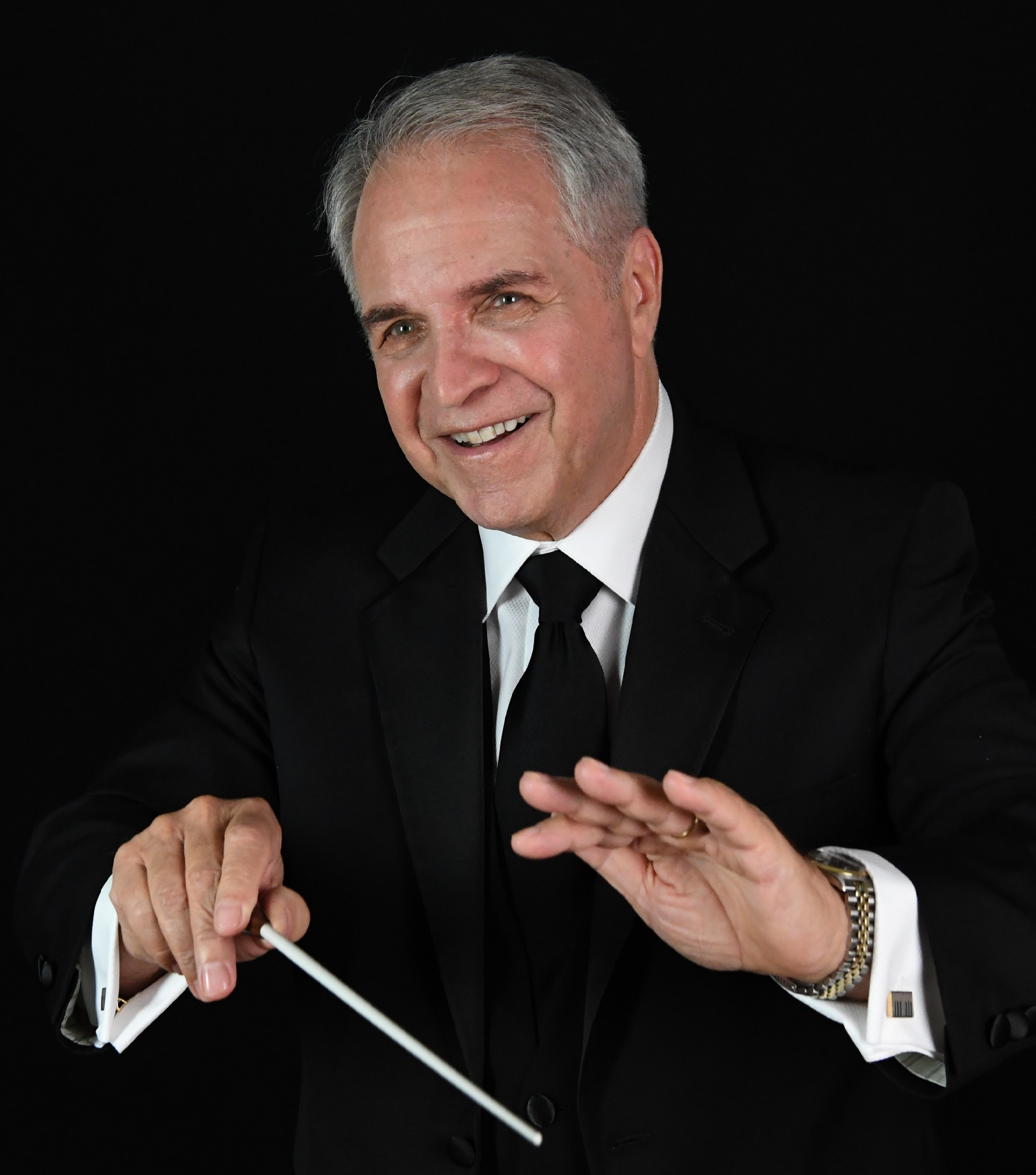
Charles Calello (seen here in 2018), in addition to briefly being a band member in 1965, did extensive arrangement for Valli and the Seasons throughout the 1960s and 1970s.

Nick Massi left the Four Seasons in September 1965, the same month another big hit for the band, the No. 3 charted "Let's Hang On!", was released. Although this was Massi's last "Four Seasons" single, he also appeared on the band's follow-up single, a cover of Bob Dylan's "Don't Think Twice, It's All Right", which was issued under the name "the Wonder Who?", and went top 20. The band's musical arranger, Charles Calello (a former member of the Four Lovers), stepped in as a temporary replacement. During Calello's brief tenure as a member, the band scored their first hit without Massi, "Working My Way Back to You", which went top 10. A few months later, Joe Long was hired to replace Calello, who returned to his role as musical arranger. Long would be a member of the band, on bass and backing vocals, until 1975. His first single with the Four Seasons was "Opus 17 (Don't You Worry 'bout Me)", which reached No. 13 in mid-1966.

Massi's departure coincided with the addition of new songwriters, such as Sandy Linzer and Denny Randell, who eased the burden on Gaudio, while Randell absorbed some of Massi's arranging duties. This period also saw Valli launch a parallel solo career, although every Valli "solo" recording from 1965's "The Sun Ain't Gonna Shine (Anymore)" to 1974's "My Eyes Adored You" was recorded with the Four Seasons at the same time and in the same sessions as material released under the Four Seasons' name; these were usually distinguished in that material written and marketed as Valli solo numbers did not have Valli's trademark falsetto. Valli's first post-1960 single without the Seasons was 1975's "Swearin' to God".

More top 20 singles followed in 1966 and 1967, including "I've Got You Under My Skin", "Beggin'" (later covered by Norwegian duo Madcon and Italian band Måneskin), "Tell It to the Rain", and "C'mon Marianne", as well as Valli "solo" singles "Can't Take My Eyes Off You" and "I Make a Fool of Myself". Also, other Crewe/Gaudio songs that did not become hits for either Valli or the Four Seasons became international hits in cover versions, such as "Silence Is Golden" for the Tremeloes and "The Sun Ain't Gonna Shine (Anymore)" for the Walker Brothers. 1968's "Will You Love Me Tomorrow" would be the band's last top 40 hit for seven years, reaching No. 24, following Valli's last "solo" hit of the 1960s, the No. 29 charted "To Give (The Reason I Live)".

=== 1969–1973: The Genuine Imitation Life Gazette; Departure of Tommy DeVito; Declining record sales; Move to Motown ===
By 1969, the band's popularity had declined, with public interest moving towards rock with a harder edge and music with more socially conscious lyrics. Aware of that, Bob Gaudio partnered with folk-rock songwriter Jake Holmes to write a concept album titled The Genuine Imitation Life Gazette, which discussed contemporary issues from the band's standpoint, including divorce ("Saturday's Father"), and Kinks-style satirical looks at modern life (e.g., "American Crucifixion and Resurrection" and "Genuine Imitation Life"). The decision to create a concept album was a major departure for the group, which Bob Crewe had purposely marketed as a singles act (so much so that the group's early albums were simply the name of a major hit single appended with some variation of "and Other Songs").

The album cover was designed to resemble the front page of a newspaper, pre-dating Jethro Tull's Thick as a Brick by three years. The record was a commercial failure (by the group's usual standards; according to Stuart Miller (owner of a Four Seasons fansite named after the album) and Joe Long, the album sold about 150,000 copies) and led to the band's departure from Philips shortly after that; but it did catch the attention of Frank Sinatra, whose 1969 album Watertown involved Gaudio, Holmes, Valli, and Calello. The Seasons' last single on Philips, 1970's "Patch of Blue", featured the band's name as "Frankie Valli & the Four Seasons", but the change in billing did not revive the band's fortunes. Reverting to the "Four Seasons" billing without Valli's name up front, the group issued a single on Crewe's eponymous label, a rendition of "And That Reminds Me", which peaked at No. 45 on the Billboard chart. Frustrated by the group's workload, and facing debts from gambling and a divorce, DeVito accepted a buyout and left the band in 1970. DeVito's mismanagement had left the band millions of dollars in debt, forcing the band to perform daily for several years. Following a UK tour with Bob Grimm on guitar, the Seasons hired Demetri Callas as DeVito's permanent replacement. Callas, a native of Maryland and fixture in the Washington, D.C., music scene with multiple hits as a session guitarist, was the first ever member of the Four Seasons not to hail from New Jersey. He would stay with the group until 1974, later acknowledging that he had been behaving wildly during his time with the band and chose to resign voluntarily rather than risk being fired.

After leaving Philips, the Four Seasons recorded a one-off single for the Warner Bros. label in England, "Sleeping Man", backed by "Whatever You Say", which was never released in the USA. John Stefan, the band's lead trumpeter, arranged the horn parts. Following that single, the band signed with Motown. The first LP, Chameleon, released by Motown subsidiary label MoWest Records in 1972, failed to sell. A 1971 Frankie Valli solo single on Motown, "Love Isn't Here", and two Four Seasons singles, "Walk On, Don't Look Back" on MoWest in 1972, and "How Come" on Motown in 1973, sank without a trace. A song from Chameleon, "The Night", later became a Northern Soul hit and reached the top 10 of the UK Singles Chart, but was not commercially released in the United States as a single, although promotional copies were distributed in 1972, showing the artist as Valli. Valli has consistently spoken of how much of the group's late 1960s and early 1970s material was poorly marketed and only later received the appreciation that he felt it deserved.

=== 1973–1977: New lineup; Signing with Warner Bros.; Resurgence of commercial success ===
In 1972, Gaudio stopped touring with the band to focus on songwriting, production, and recording. Long later told a Four Seasons fansite that he believed that Gaudio stopped touring because of constant stage fright. His divorce from his first wife was also affecting him at the time. In addition, the worsening relationship between the band and an increasingly erratic Bob Crewe forced Gaudio to take over Crewe's responsibilities. The band recruited Clay Jordan as their new keyboardist. Jordan was unable to handle the vocal strain of Gaudio's tenor parts; and, after a few months, keyboardist Bill DeLoach took his place, while touring drummer Paul Wilson (who also served as the live "double" backing up Valli's falsetto voice to emulate their record sound) was promoted to official membership. On March 25, 1973, with DeVito's debts finally paid off and following a concert in which DeLoach was unable to sing, Valli—in severe pain from ulcers and losing his hearing due to otosclerosis—angrily fired everyone in the band except Joe Long and briefly announced his intent to disband the Four Seasons. (Valli and DeLoach would eventually reconcile years later.)

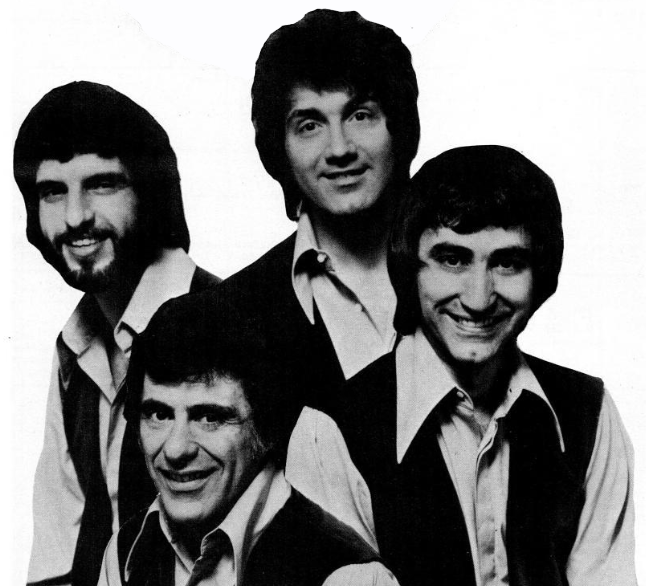
A 1973 Four Seasons advertisement published by Motown for Billboard. Clockwise from top: Demetri Callas, Joe Long, Frankie Valli, Bob Gaudio.

Valli was soon persuaded to return; Bob Crewe (who joined the Seasons at Motown in 1973) then convinced Nick Massi to return to the studio to help Valli and the band record eight tracks for a potential second MoWest album in late 1973 and 1974. These sessions were where Gaudio met his next songwriting partner and future wife, Judy Parker. Valli rehired Callas, while Jordan agreed to temporarily return until Valli recruited two new members; 19-year-old Lee Shapiro as keyboardist and arranger, and Gerry Polci as drummer and eventual vocalist. The sessions produced the single "Hickory," a minor hit—it peaked at No. 90 on the Cash Box charts—despite no promotion from MoWest, which was winding down operations and dropped the band without releasing the unfinished album (it would eventually be released as Inside You, branded as a Valli solo album in 1975). On behalf of the Four Seasons Partnership, Valli tried to purchase the entire collection of master recordings the group had made for Motown and MoWest. After hearing the amount needed to buy them all, Valli arranged to purchase "My Eyes Adored You" for $4,000. He took the tape to Larry Uttal, the owner and founder of Private Stock Records, who wanted to release it as a Frankie Valli solo single. Although the band remained unsigned in the later part of 1974, Valli had a new label—and a new solo career.

Following Demetri Callas' departure in 1974, Polci recommended the Happenings' guitarist John Paiva (who had also worked as a session musician) as replacement. Don Ciccone, whose career with the Critters had come to an abrupt end due to his entry into the armed forces, also joined in 1974, and for a brief time, the Seasons were a sextet, before Joe Long chose to leave in 1975.

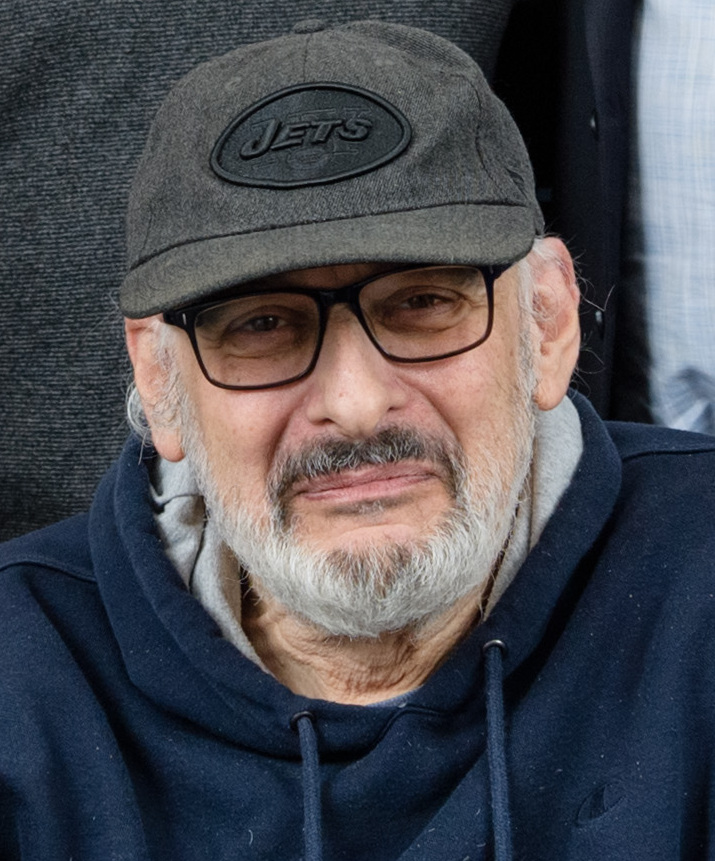
Lee Shapiro (seen here in 2022) joined as keyboardist and arranger in 1973.

As "My Eyes Adored You" climbed the Hot 100 singles chart in early 1975, Uttal was persuaded to release The Four Seasons Story, a two-record compilation of the band's biggest hit singles from 1962 to 1970. It quickly became a gold record, selling over one million copies before the RIAA started awarding platinum records for million-selling albums. Uttal was unwilling to sign the group as a whole, but left a loophole in Valli's contract allowing him to stay with the group if they signed with another label. Gaudio then approached Mike Curb with a new song, "Who Loves You," with Ciccone on lead vocal due to Valli being overseas during the recording; Curb, who appreciated the band for their drug-free, clean-cut reputation, helped secure an agreement with Warner Bros. Records, who was intrigued by a new Four Seasons lead singer. Valli was unwilling to give up lead vocal duties and managed to halt the release of "Who Loves You" until he could replace Ciccone's vocal with his own. Long departed the band following the release of "Who Loves You," amid disagreements with the newer, younger members of the band; Ciccone would take over as the band's bassist full-time after Long's resignation. The album Who Loves You became a surprise million-seller for the band, as Valli ultimately agreed to cede some lead vocals to Polci and Ciccone, making it the first album since Massi's departure to feature a lead or co-lead other than Valli prominently.

In 1975, record sales exploded for both Valli and the Four Seasons as both acts had million-selling singles in the United States ("My Eyes Adored You" hit No. 1 on the Hot 100 for Valli in March, "Who Loves You" (with Valli on lead) peaked at No. 3 in November for the band and No. 6 in the UK chart). In the United Kingdom, Tamla Motown released "The Night" as a single on the 'Mowest' label and saw it reach the No. 7 position on the UK Singles Chart. "My Eyes Adored You" was also a top 10 hit in the United Kingdom in February of that year. Valli had his first truly solo hit in the summer of 1975 when the Bob Crewe-produced "Swearin' to God" followed "My Eyes Adored You" into the upper reaches of the Hot 100, peaking at the No. 6 position and capitalizing on the growing disco craze. The song was released in three forms: the eight-minute album version, the ten-minute extended 12-inch single version, and the four-minute single version. This record featured Patti Austin on bridge vocals before she became well known. Valli followed this with a discofied No. 11 hit version of Ruby & the Romantics' "Our Day Will Come", also featuring Austin.

The Four Seasons opened 1976 atop the Billboard chart with their fifth No. 1 single, "December, 1963 (Oh, What a Night)", co-written by Bob Gaudio and Judy Parker. The single also hit No. 1 in the United Kingdom. "December, 1963 (Oh, What a Night)" had Polci singing lead on the verses, Ciccone featured on specific sections, and Valli on lead vocals only on the two bridge sections and backup vocals on the chorus.

Although the band also scored minor chart placements with "Silver Star" (with Valli on harmony vocals) (No. 38 in 1976) and "Down the Hall" (No. 65 in 1977), both sung by Polci, and "Spend the Night in Love" (No. 91 in 1980), which again featured Polci as main lead vocalist and Valli singing the bridge section and contributing to backup group vocals, "December, 1963" marked the end of the Seasons' hit-making run. Both singles were hits in the United Kingdom, with "Silver Star" making the top 10. (A dance remix of "December, 1963" returned them briefly to the upper reaches of the Billboard singles charts almost two decades later).

The success of Who Loves You increased the popularity of the Four Seasons as a touring group and reignited recording unit. In 1977, the band recorded Helicon as a follow-up to Who Loves You; it proved to be not as successful, with its lone American single "Down the Hall" peaking in the lower half of the Hot 100 and narrowly reaching the top 40 of the American easy listening charts and the UK charts. Additional top-40 UK hits would come with "Rhapsody," and a non-album cover version of the Beatles' "We Can Work It Out" (from All This and World War II).

=== 1977–1999: Brief split and reunion; Final studio recordings as a band; Increased focus on touring ===
The band broke up in 1977 as Shapiro got married, Polci began working for Barry Manilow, and Valli—who also had surgery to restore his worsening hearing—accepted an offer to sing the theme song for the movie Grease. Both the film and song were major hits, the latter reaching No. 1, and by 1980 the band had reunited, with a lineup consisting of Valli, Polci, Ciccione, and two new members, singer and keyboardist Jerry Corbetta, who had been lead singer of Sugarloaf, and guitarist Larry Lingle, with Gaudio back for studio work. Corbetta would remain with the group until the mid-1980s, while Lingle would remain until the mid-1990s. Polci and Ciccione both left the group in 1982, though Polci would return during the late 1980s, before leaving again in 1990, when he married Valli's daughter Toni. In January 1981, Warners released Frankie Valli & the Four Seasons Reunited Live. Produced by Bob Gaudio, it was a double album of concert recordings which included the two studio recordings "Spend the Night in Love" and "Heaven Must Have Sent You (Here in the Night)" sung by Valli. The latter became a UK single but failed to chart, while the former was released as a single in America, inching its way into the Hot 100 and became a top-5 hit, the group's last, in South Africa. Valli had planned to add his daughter Francine to the act in 1980, but Francine unexpectedly died that year.

The early 1980s saw the addition of keyboardist/music director Robby Robinson. He remained a member of the group until 1996, before returning in 2004 and remaining with the Four Seasons ever since. In 1984, a long-awaited collaboration between the Four Seasons and the Beach Boys, "East Meets West", was released on FBI Records, owned by the Four Seasons Partnership, which included most of the surviving Beach Boys (including Brian Wilson). However, the record did not sell well. Even after the rise and fall of the band's sales in the disco era, the Four Seasons, in one version or another, continued to be a popular touring act. The touring contributed to roughly half of the group's income in the late 1980s, with the other half coming from royalties and Gaudio's songwriting and production work for other artists; under the terms of his original partnership with Valli, any songwriting revenue Gaudio earned would be split evenly with Valli.

In August 1985, MCA Records released the band album Streetfighter, which yielded two singles in the title track and "Book of Love", a post-disco-style revamp of the Monotones' 1957 recording. In September 1992, the band released an album entitled Hope + Glory on the MCA/Curb label; this is the most recent band studio album to date, but Valli has released three solo albums since then. On at least one or two occasions, starting in the late 1980s or early 1990s, former member Joe Long would make guest appearances with Valli and the band at select shows, but it is unclear if this included full performances or parts of concerts. Nick Massi also had occasional brief reunions with the group. In 1990, the original four members – Frankie Valli, Bob Gaudio, Tommy DeVito, and Nick Massi – appeared together for the first time in 25 years, at the Four Seasons' induction to the Rock and Roll Hall of Fame. Valli had unsuccessfully fought to have Joe Long included in the induction. In 1994, "December 1963 (Oh What A Night)" re-entered the Hot 100 by way of a remix.

=== 2000–2026: Valli-led tours and Jersey Boys ===
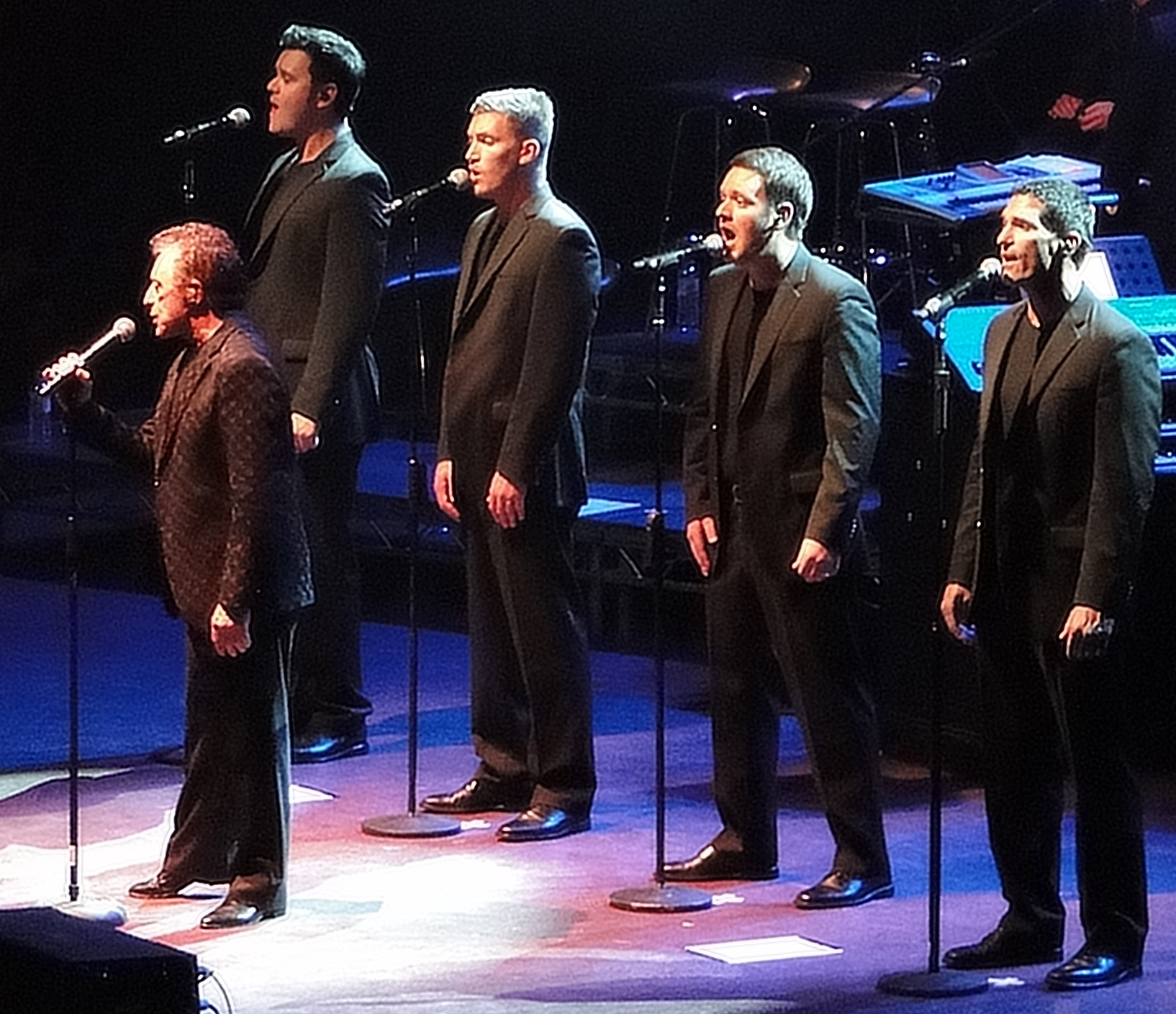
Valli with the Modern Gentlemen, who served as the Four Seasons from 2003 to 2018

By the early 2000s, the Four Seasons tours were falling in attendance and revenue, prompting Valli to seriously consider retirement. He instead assembled a new backing quartet consisting of Landon Beard, Todd Fournier, and brothers Brian Brigham and Brandon Brigham. The success of the musical Jersey Boys largely saved the Four Seasons.

A 3CD + 1DVD box set ...Jersey Beat... The Music of Frankie Valli & the 4 Seasons was released in mid-2007, marketed as the most comprehensive collection of Four Seasons music yet. The album title Jersey Beat is a play on Jersey Boys, a successful Broadway musical about the Four Seasons, as well as on Mersey Beat, a term first coined as the title of a music magazine published in Liverpool, England, from 1961, but subsequently also used to describe Liverpool's "beat music" culture of the early 1960s.

In 2008, the Four Seasons' "Beggin'" was revived by two acts. Pilooski made an electro remix of that song, while rap act Madcon used it as the basis of their song "Beggin'". The latter reached No. 5 in the UK charts and was a hit across Europe. The song was featured in a TV commercial for Adidas shoes entitled "Celebrate Originality". The Adidas commercial is a popular hit on YouTube and features a house party with famous celebrities such as David Beckham, Russel Simmons, Kevin Garnett, Missy Elliott, Katy Perry, and Mark Gonzales. Also in 2008, Gaudio and Robinson recorded Jersey Babys: The Instrumental Music of Frankie Valli and the Four Seasons for Kids, an instrumental children's album, under the Four Seasons brand but without Valli's direct involvement. Jersey Babys [sic] was originally envisioned by Danielle Lahlezar, Gaudio's daughter from his first marriage to Brit Olsen (to whom the album was dedicated). Jersey Babys was re-released in 2024 with an additional bonus track.

Members of the 1970s lineup of the group (Polci, Ciccone, and Shapiro) reunited without Valli in 2011 as the Hit Men; it toured with several other session musicians of good repute. Shapiro has continued the Hit Men as a standalone project after Ciccone died in 2016 and Polci withdrew from the group in 2017. Long and Polci both have had stints with the Jersey Four, a Four Seasons tribute act based in New Jersey.

In 2015, former longtime guitarist Larry Lingle rejoined the band, and he left for the second time after a concert on May 1, 2016. On September 10, 2016, the band performed with the BBC Concert Orchestra in Hyde Park, as part of the BBC Proms in the Park.

In 2018, the Beard/Fournier/Brigham quartet spun off and began performing as the Modern Gentlemen, with Valli's blessing, and Valli recruited a new quartet of singers to back him. Beard, Fournier, and the Brigham brothers performed as the Four Seasons for 15 years, longer than any other lineup and longer than any of the band's other members except Valli, Gaudio and Robinson.

In 2020, the group launched a YouTube channel. During that same year, and continuing into 2021, during earlier phases of the coronavirus (COVID-19) pandemic, the group virtually re-recorded three of their songs ("Harmony, Perfect Harmony", "Let's Hang On" and "Silence Is Golden"), as well as Valli's hit, "Grease", for their YouTube channel. The channel has since added archival videos from the group's television appearances and records by Four Seasons tribute acts, such as former Jersey Boys cast members.

A limited-edition 44-disc career box set called Working Our Way Back to You: The Ultimate Collection was initially going to be released in the summer of 2021 by The Four Seasons Partnership and Snapper Records, but it missed the release due to the COVID-19 pandemic. However, the box set was later rescheduled for release on December 9, 2022, before the release date was pushed back to April 14, 2023. The box set was eventually released on June 2, 2023, by The Four Seasons Partnership and Madfish/Snapper Music. It includes every album released by the band (including both mono and stereo mixes, where available), a CD of unreleased tracks from the band's Mowest years, three live shows taken from soundboard recordings as well as numerous other rare tracks and alternative versions.

The Four Seasons announced their farewell tour, The Last Encores Tour, to run through 2024, including several extended stays at the Westgate Las Vegas Resort & Casino. In an interview with the Los Angeles Times, Valli did not rule out future appearances after the tour, stating that "I'm not sure whether I'm gonna keep going out." The tour was eventually extended into 2025, with representatives for Valli responding to criticism of him touring at such an advanced age and fears of elder abuse by assuring that Valli was "doing just fine and super happy to be still performing." In a statement to People, Valli indicated a willingness to continue performing as long as audiences continued to buy tickets, responding to accusations of lip syncing by noting that his touring production was using a strategy it had long relied on for studio recordings "layering vocals and instruments" to allow the Seasons to maintain a sound similar to that heard in the 1960s despite Valli's age. The tour was abruptly halted on September 29, 2025, due to Valli suffering an illness, and most remaining tour dates were cancelled. Valli made a brief attempt at resuming touring in February 2026, an attempt that was cut short after only three concerts; after these three shows, Valli announced that the shows scheduled in April and May 2026 would be his last in those cities. The April and May shows were ultimately never played, as Valli again announced the cancellation of his remaining tour dates on May 29, 2026 through the end of the year at minimum; he stopped short of fully retiring, stating that he would reassess his health in 2027, but that his promoters had been instructed to refund any tickets sold and not reschedule the cancelled dates. Valli's brother, singer Bobby Valli, indicated in August 2026—shortly after Valli had made his first public appearance since his most recent concerts, looking visibly frail and weak—that Frankie "will now retire(.)" Valli's publicist released a statement stating that this was not the case. There has been no indication from representatives of Gaudio or Valli of what will happen to the Four Seasons brand once Valli is no longer able to lead it.

Throughout the Four Seasons' 66-year existence, no incarnation of the group has ever won a competitive Grammy Award. In 2025, Valli was awarded the Grammy Lifetime Achievement Award, the only Grammy the group has yet received.

== Other names ==
From 1956 until "My Eyes Adored You" in 1975, records which the Four Seasons recorded had the following artist credit (a sampling):

=== Pre-1960 ===
- Frankie Vall
- Frankie Valley
- Frankie Valle and the Romans
- The Four Lovers
- Frankie Tyler
- The Variatones

=== 1960 and after ===
- The Four Seasons
- Hal Miller and the Rays
- Billy Dixon and the Topics
- Johnny Halo featuring the Four Seasons
- The 4 Seasons
- The Wonder Who?
- Frankie Valli
- The Valli Boys
- Frankie Valli and the Four Seasons
- The Romans
- The Village Voices

== Members ==
Partial credits before 1994.

=== Final members ===
- Frankie Valli – lead and backing vocals (1960–1977, 1979–2026)
- Bob Gaudio – backing vocals, keyboards, guitar (1960–1977, 1979–2026; not touring 1972–2026)
- Robby Robinson – keyboards, musical director (1982–1996, 2004–2026)
- Craig Cady – backing vocals (2018–2026)
- Aaron Alexander Gordon – backing vocals (2022–2026)
- Justin Michael Rodriguez – backing vocals (2024–2026)
- Heath Francis – backing vocals (2025–2026)

=== Final touring musicians ===
- Rick Keller – saxophone, flute, keyboards, percussion (2010–2026)
- Basil Fung – guitar (2018–2026)
- Andy Sanesi – drums (2018–2026)
- Carmen Grillo – guitar (2021–2026)
- Alfredo Lopez – bass (2021–2026)
- Erik Garcia – keyboards (2024–2026)
- Chris Vasquez – guitar (2025–2026)

=== Former members ===
- Tommy DeVito – backing vocals, guitar (1960–1970; died 2020)
- Nick Massi – backing vocals, bass (1960–1965, 1973–1974; died 2000)
- Charles Calello – backing vocals, bass (1965)
- Joe Long – backing vocals, bass (1965–1975; died 2021)
- Bob Grimm – backing vocals, guitar (1970–1971)
- Demetri Callas – backing vocals, guitar (1971–1974; died 2020)
- Clay Jordan – backing vocals, keyboards (1972, 1973)
- Bill DeLoach – backing vocals, keyboards (1972–1973)
- Paul Wilson – backing vocals, drums (1972–1973; touring musician 1971–1972)
- Gerry Polci – backing and lead vocals, drums (1973–1977, 1979–1982, 1988–1990)
- Lee Shapiro – backing vocals, keyboards (1973–1977)
- John Paiva – backing vocals, guitar (1974–1977)
- Don Ciccone – backing and lead vocals, bass, guitar (1975–1977, 1979–1982; died 2016)
- Larry Lingle – guitar (1979–1993, 2015–2016)
- Jerry Corbetta – backing vocals, keyboards (1979–1985; died 2016)
- Rex Robinson – backing vocals, bass (1982–2003; died 2015)
- Chuck Wilson – backing vocals, drums, percussion (1982–1993; died 2018)
- Lynn Hamman – drums (1982–1988)
- Tim Stone – backing and lead vocals, keyboards (1991–1996; died 2023)
- Landon Beard – backing and lead vocals (2002–2018)
- Brandon Brigham – backing and lead vocals (2002–2018)
- Brian Brigham – backing and lead vocals (2002–2018)
- Todd Fournier – backing and lead vocals (2002–2018)
- Jason Martinez – backing and lead vocals (2002–2007, 2018)
- Val Martinez – backing and lead vocals (2006)
- Brad Sharp – backing and lead vocals (2014–2016)
- Ronen Bay – backing and lead vocals (2018–2024)
- Joseph Ott – backing and lead vocals (2018–2022)
- Erik Bates – backing and lead vocals (2018–2020)
- Noah Rivera – backing vocals (2020–2024)

=== Former touring musicians ===
- Ron Roach – drums (1960–1966)
- Joey Cass – drums (1966–1970; died 2009)
- Billy Long – drums (1970)
- Gary Volpe – drums (1970–1971)
- Al Ruzicka – organ, keyboards (1971–1972)
- Mike Lingle – drums (1982–1985)
- Robin Swenson – keyboards (1985–1991)
- Howard Larrabee – backing vocals, keyboards (1988–1990)
- Richie Gajate-Garcia – percussion (1990–2019)
- Daniel "Zoro" Donelly – drums (1994–2005)
- Fino Roverato – guitar (1994–2001)
- Tommy Alvarado – saxophone, percussion (1994–1996)
- Adrian Baker – backing vocals, guitar (1994–1995)
- Warren Ham – saxophone (1996–2000)
- Rich Callaci – keyboards (2003)
- Keith Hubacher – bass (2004–2007, 2016–2018)
- Craig Pilo – drums (2005–2018)
- Robbie Angelucci – guitar (2010-2014)
- John Menzano – bass (2010-2014)
- John Schroeder – guitar (2010–2014)
- Sandro Rebel – keyboards (2018–2020)
- Wil Roberts – bass (2018–2020)
- Christian Moraga – percussion (2019–2020)
- Edwin Livingston – bass (2020)
- Jamie Kime – guitar (2020–2021)
- Steve Warren – bass (2021)

== Discography ==
=== Studio albums ===
- Sherry & 11 Others (1962)
- The 4 Seasons Greetings (1962)
- Big Girls Don't Cry and Twelve Others... (1963)
- The 4 Seasons Sing Ain't That a Shame and 11 Others (1963)
- Born to Wander (1964)
- Dawn (Go Away) and 11 Other Great Songs (1964)
- Rag Doll (1964)
- The 4 Seasons Entertain You (1965)
- The 4 Seasons Sing Big Hits by Burt Bacharach... Hal David... Bob Dylan... (1965)
- On Stage with The 4 Seasons (studio album with audience overdubs) (1965)
- Working My Way Back to You and More Great New Hits (1966)
- New Gold Hits (1967)
- The Genuine Imitation Life Gazette (1969)
- Half & Half (half of the album is by the Four Seasons and the other half is by Frankie Valli "solo") (1970)
- Chameleon (1972)
- Who Loves You (1975)
- Helicon (1977)
- Streetfighter (1985)
- Hope + Glory (1992)

=== Live albums ===
- Reunited Live (1981)

=== Selected compilation albums ===
- Golden Hits of the 4 Seasons (includes two new tracks) (1963)
- Folk-Nanny (1963) (reissued as Stay & Other Great Hits in 1964)
- More Golden Hits by The Four Seasons (1964)
- The International Battle of the Century: The Beatles vs The Four Seasons (split with The Beatles)
- The 4 Seasons' Gold Vault of Hits (1965) (includes two new tracks)
- The 4 Seasons' 2nd Vault of Golden Hits (1966) (includes three new tracks)
- Lookin' Back (1966)
- Edizione D'Oro: The 4 Seasons Gold Edition – 29 Gold Hits (1968) (includes two new tracks)
- The Four Seasons Story (1975)
- Hits (1988) (includes one new track)
- Rarities Volume 1 (1990)
- Rarities Volume 2 (1990)
- December 1963 (Oh, What a Night): The Dance Album (1993)
- Oh, What a Night (1995)
- The Very Best of Frankie Valli & The Four Seasons (2002)
- ...Jersey Beat... The Music of Frankie Valli & The 4 Seasons (2006) (3-CD + 1-DVD box set)
- Working Our Way Back to You: The Ultimate Collection (2022) (44-CD + 1-LP box set)

=== US Top 40 singles ===
The US chart position on the Billboard Hot 100 singles chart follows the song title.

- 1962: "Sherry", No. 1
- 1962: "Big Girls Don't Cry", No. 1
- 1962: "Santa Claus Is Comin' to Town", No. 23
- 1963: "Walk Like a Man", No. 1
- 1963: "Ain't That a Shame", No. 22
- 1963: "Candy Girl", No. 3 / "Marlena", No. 36 (double-sided hit)
- 1963: "New Mexican Rose", No. 36
- 1964: "Dawn (Go Away)", No. 3
- 1964: "Stay", No. 16
- 1964: "Ronnie", No. 6
- 1964: "Alone", No. 28
- 1964: "Rag Doll", No. 1
- 1964: "Save It for Me", No. 10
- 1964: "Big Man in Town", No. 20
- 1965: "Bye, Bye, Baby (Baby Goodbye)", No. 12 ("Bye Bye Baby" on initial release)
- 1965: "Girl Come Running", No. 30
- 1965: "Let's Hang On!", No. 3
- 1965: "Don't Think Twice", No. 12 (credited to The Wonder Who?)
- 1966: "Working My Way Back to You", No. 9
- 1966: "Opus 17 (Don't You Worry 'bout Me)", No. 13
- 1966: "I've Got You Under My Skin", No. 9
- 1966: "Tell It to the Rain", No. 10
- 1967: "Beggin'", No. 16
- 1967: "C'mon Marianne", No. 9
- 1967: "Watch the Flowers Grow", No. 30
- 1968: "Will You Love Me Tomorrow", No. 24
- 1975: "Who Loves You", No. 3
- 1975: "December, 1963 (Oh, What a Night)", No. 1
- 1976: "Silver Star", No. 38
- 1994: "December, 1963 (Oh, What a Night)", No. 14 (remixed dance version)

== Jersey Boys ==
Jersey Boys, a musical play based on the lives of the Four Seasons and directed by Des McAnuff (The Who's Tommy, 700 Sundays), premiered at his La Jolla Playhouse and opened on November 6, 2005, to generally positive reviews. It subsequently won multiple Tony Awards after its move to Broadway. The original cast included John Lloyd Young as Frankie Valli, Daniel Reichard as Bob Gaudio, Christian Hoff as Tommy DeVito, and J. Robert Spencer as Nick Massi. The play portrays the history of the Four Seasons in four parts, with each part narrated by a different member of the band and supposedly reflecting that band member's perspective on the band's history. The author of the book of the play, Rick Elice, interviewed Valli, Gaudio, and DeVito in writing the play, and pieced together Nick Massi's point of view based on those interviews (Massi had died before the play was written.) The Broadway production won four 2006 Tony Awards, including Best Musical, Best Actor (for John Lloyd Young as Frankie Valli), Best Featured Actor (for Christian Hoff as Tommy DeVito), and Best Lighting Design. There are currently three U.S. productions of Jersey Boys running outside New York and other productions overseas including productions in Toronto, London, Australia, South Africa and The Netherlands.

The movie adaptation, directed and produced by Clint Eastwood, starred John Lloyd Young as Frankie Valli, Vincent Piazza as Tommy DeVito, Michael Lomenda as Nick Massi and Erich Bergen as Bob Gaudio. This film was released on June 20, 2014.
