= Candy Girl (The Four Seasons song) =

Single by The Four Seasons

from the album Ain't That a Shame and 11 Others
- B-side: "Marlena"
- Released: June 1963
- Genre: Pop
- Length: 2:39
- Label: Vee-Jay Records
- Songwriter(s): Larry Santos
- Producer(s): Bob Crewe

The Four Seasons singles chronology
"Ain't That a Shame!" (1963)	"Candy Girl" (1963)	"New Mexican Rose" (1963)

"Candy Girl" is the title of a hit single recorded in 1963 by the Four Seasons. Written by Larry Santos, it is the first original Four Seasons single composed by neither Bob Gaudio nor Bob Crewe. The writer, Larry Santos, would become a chart artist in his own right with 1976's "We Can't Hide It Anymore". A stereo version was released in 1975, on The Four Seasons Story album.

The B-side, "Marlena", was a Top 40 hit in its own right: it reached No. 36 on the Hot 100. It was written by Gaudio.

== Background ==
The song tackles the subject of a girlfriend with whom the singer's "love is real". The Four Seasons song is a rock ballad to a loving girlfriend ("I've been a-searching o’er this big wide world/Now, finally, I found my/Candy Girl").

== Chart performance ==
"Candy Girl" reached No. 3 on the Billboard Hot 100 singles chart and No. 13 on the R&B chart, the last of the group's entries to make the R&B chart.
