= Ronnie (The Four Seasons song) =

Single by The Four Seasons

from the album Rag Doll
- B-side: "Born to Wander (from the album Born To Wander)"
- Released: March 1964
- Genre: Pop
- Length: 2:56
- Label: Philips Records
- Songwriter(s): Bob Crewe-Bob Gaudio
- Producer(s): Bob Crewe

The Four Seasons singles chronology
"Stay" (1964)	"Ronnie" (1964)	"Alone" (1964)

"Ronnie" is a song by Bob Gaudio and Bob Crewe. The Four Seasons recorded and released the original version in 1964. The recording reached the #6 position on the Billboard Hot 100 singles chart.

Cash Box said that it is "sparked by a hard-driving arrangement that deftly complements the 'Seasons' sound."
