= Save It for Me =

Single by The Four Seasons

from the album Rag Doll
- B-side: "Funny Face (from the same album)"
- Released: August 1964
- Recorded: July 1964
- Genre: Pop rock
- Length: 2:35
- Label: Philips
- Songwriter(s): Bob Gaudio, Bob Crewe
- Producer(s): Bob Crewe

The Four Seasons singles chronology
"Rag Doll" (1964)	"Save It for Me" (1964)	"Sincerely" (1964)

"Save It for Me" is a song written by Bob Gaudio and Bob Crewe. A song recorded in 1964 by The Four Seasons for their Rag Doll album, it was released as the follow-up record to the album's title song, which had hit the #1 position on the Billboard Hot 100 singles chart in July 1964. "Save It for Me" was also a success for the quartet, reaching the #10 position on the Billboard singles chart. It featured arrangement work by Denny Randell, who would later go on to become a songwriter for the group.

Billboard described the song as a "medium tempo ballad, featuring ethereal organ support," calling it a "smasheroo." Cash Box said it has "a wild 'Telstar' instrumentation" and "quite a sound."
