= Dawn (Go Away) =

Single by the Four Seasons

from the album Dawn (Go Away) and 11 Other Great Songs
- B-side: "No Surfin' Today (from the album Born To Wander)"
- Released: January 1964
- Recorded: November 1963
- Genre: Pop
- Length: 2:10
- Label: Philips
- Songwriter: Bob Gaudio-Sandy Linzer
- Producer: Bob Crewe

The Four Seasons singles chronology
"Peanuts" (1963)	"Dawn (Go Away)" (1964)	"Stay" (1964)

"Dawn (Go Away)" is a song written by Bob Gaudio and Sandy Linzer and recorded by the Four Seasons in November 1963. The song hit No. 3 in the early part of 1964. According to Billboard, it was the 25th biggest hit single of the year, placing behind "Rag Doll", another Four Seasons hit, which was No. 24.

== Background ==
The song was recorded as the Four Seasons were involved in a royalty dispute with Vee-Jay Records. As the lawsuit proceeded, the group recorded "Dawn" and a handful of other songs and withheld the master tapes from Vee-Jay, which then claimed breach of contract. The dispute was not settled until 1965, a year after the Four Seasons officially left Vee-Jay.

The group signed with Philips Records, a subsidiary of Mercury Records, shortly thereafter. "Dawn (Go Away)" was released in January 1964. It took four weeks to climb the Billboard Hot 100 chart to No. 3 on February 29, 1964, prevented from going higher by the Beatles' "I Want to Hold Your Hand" and "She Loves You", which became the top two singles of 1964. "Dawn" remained at No. 3 for three weeks, then dropped to make way for two further Beatles singles ("Twist and Shout" and "Please Please Me"). During its six-week run in the Top 10, only Beatles hits ranked above it in the chart.

Cash Box said that the song "is delivered with that stompin', falsetto-highlighted money-making touch of the Four Seasons" and praised the arrangement and conducting by Charles Calello.

Originally written as a folk song, arranger Charles Calello sped it up and, at Valli's suggestion, added a galloping rhythm guitar borrowed from Kai Winding's version of "More". Drummer Buddy Saltzman accented the recording with bombastic around-the-kit fills and ghost notes without using any cymbals.

"Dawn (Go Away)" was the only Philips single crediting the Four Seasons that did not have the notation "featuring the 'sound' of Frankie Valli".
