= Opus 17 (Don't You Worry 'bout Me) =

Single by The Four Seasons

from the album 2nd Vault of Golden Hits
- B-side: "Beggar's Parade (from the album Workin' My Way Back to You and More Great New Hits)"
- Released: May 1966
- Genre: Pop-soul; blue-eyed soul
- Length: 2:32
- Label: Philips
- Songwriter: Sandy Linzer-Denny Randell
- Producer: Bob Crewe

The Four Seasons singles chronology
"Peanuts" (1966)	"Opus 17 (Don't You Worry 'bout Me)" (1966)	"On The Good Ship Lollipop" (1966)

"Opus 17 (Don't You Worry 'bout Me)" is a song composed by Sandy Linzer and Denny Randell and recorded by The Four Seasons in 1966 for their album Working My Way Back to You.

== Background ==
"Opus 17" was the first hit with new full-time bassist and bass vocalist Joe Long. The title meant that this was the 17th single released by the Four Seasons.

As was the case with another Linzer-Randell contribution to the Four Seasons catalog, "Let's Hang On!", "Opus 17" features a rhythmic vocal hook within each verse, but, unlike in most Four Seasons singles up to that point, the song uses very little falsetto from Frankie Valli except during the closing fade; by 1966, Valli was tiring of singing falsetto and, over the next several years, would begin singing music that did not require it. "Opus 17" maintains an unchanging 8-bar chord progression throughout the song, but it is played in the key of F-sharp major at the beginning and goes up by successive half steps for five of the repeats until reaching B major for the final chorus.

Billboard praised the "excellent vocal and instrumental production." Cash Box described the song as a "pulsating, blues-soaked romancer with an infectious, Seasons-associated repeating, danceable riff." Record World said it "gets rolling like mad and then modulates upward."

== Chart history ==
The song was released as the official follow-up to "Working My Way Back to You" and reached the #13 position on the Billboard Hot 100 singles chart.

Chart (1966)	Peak position
Canada RPM Top Singles	33
New Zealand (Listener)	9
South Africa (Springbok)	12
UK	20
U.S. Billboard Hot 100	13
U.S. Cash Box Top 100	9
