= Charles Calello =

American songwriter (born 1938)

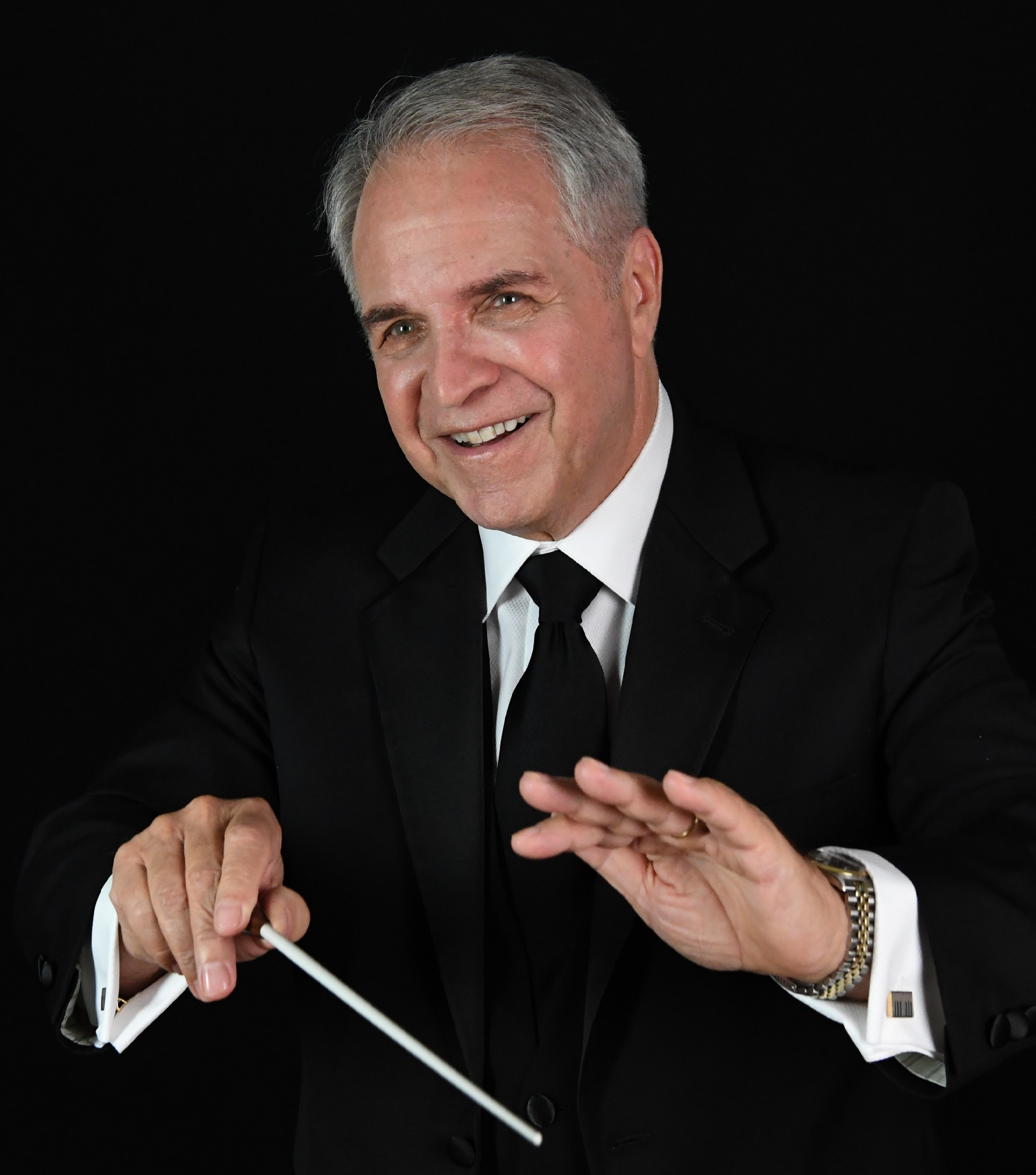
- Calello conducting in 2018

Background information
- Born: August 24, 1938 (age 88); Newark, New Jersey, US
- Genres: Rock, pop
- Occupations: Record producer, arranger, conductor, composer, musician
- Instrument: Bass guitar
- Years active: 1956–present
- Formerly of: The Four Seasons

Charles Calello (born August 24, 1938) is an American arranger, composer, conductor, record producer, and singer born in Newark, New Jersey. Calello attended Newark Arts High School and the Manhattan School of Music, in New York City. His track record of successfully collaborating with various artists to produce or arrange Billboard hit songs led to his nickname in the industry as the "Hit Man".

In the late 1950s, Calello was a member of Frankie Valli's group The Four Lovers, but left before the group was transformed into The Four Seasons. In 1962, he became the group's musical arranger. In 1965, he briefly filled in for Nick Massi (who was Calello's replacement in The Four Lovers five years earlier but had abruptly quit the band) while the band prepared Joe Long to take the role on a permanent basis. Following his stint with the Seasons, he became a staff arranger/producer at Columbia Records. In 1968, he became an independent producer and arranger and a year later arranged Frank Sinatra's album Watertown, written by Bob Gaudio.

He has worked and recorded with Barbra Streisand, Frank Sinatra, Roberto Carlos, Neil Diamond, Al Kooper, Bruce Springsteen, Jane Olivor, Laura Nyro, Liza Minnelli, Engelbert Humperdinck, the Cyrkle, Jimmy Clanton, Ray Charles, Deana Martin, Natalie Cole, Bobby Vinton, Janis Ian, Barry Manilow, Juice Newton, Red Rider, Nancy Sinatra, the Highwaymen, Shirley Ellis, Deborah Allen, and many others. Calello was the conductor and responsible for the string arrangements on Springsteen's "Jungleland" from the album Born to Run.

Calello has had over 100 Billboard chart records, 38 of which have been top 20. Some of his hits include "Sweet Caroline" by Neil Diamond, "Native New Yorker" by Odyssey, "My Heart Belongs to Me" by Barbra Streisand, and "After the Lovin'" by Engelbert Humperdinck. In 1979, he had his own hit record with a disco version of "Sing, Sing, Sing".

He has also composed film music, including the scores to Who Killed Teddy Bear (1965) and The Lonely Lady (1983). In 1992, he became principal arranger and assistant conductor of the Florida Symphonic Pops in Boca Raton, which became the Sunshine Pops Orchestra.

Calello was one of many prominent musicians who was defrauded by manager Stan Polley in the late 1960s and 1970s.
