= Sherry (song) =

Single by the Four Seasons

from the album Sherry & 11 Others
- B-side: "I've Cried Before"
- Released: August 1962
- Recorded: July 1962
- Genre: Doo-wop; pop; pop rock; R&B
- Length: 2:32
- Label: Vee-Jay
- Songwriter: Bob Gaudio
- Producer: Bob Crewe

The Four Seasons singles chronology
"Bermuda/Spanish Lace" (1961)	"Sherry" (1962)	"Big Girls Don't Cry" (1962)

"Sherry" is a song written by Bob Gaudio and recorded by the Four Seasons.

== Song information ==
According to Gaudio, the song took about 15 minutes to write and was originally titled "Jackie Baby" (in honor of then-First Lady Jacqueline Kennedy). In a 1968 interview, Gaudio said that the song was inspired by the 1961 Bruce Channel hit "Hey! Baby".

At the studio, the name was changed to "Terri Baby", and eventually to "Sherry", the name of the daughter of Gaudio's best friend, New York DJ Jack Spector. One of the names that Gaudio pondered for the song was "Peri Baby", which was the name of the record label for which Bob Crewe worked, named after the label owner's daughter.

The single's B-side was "I've Cried Before". Both tracks were included in the group's subsequent album release, Golden Hits of the 4 Seasons (1963).

In 2023, "Sherry" was selected for preservation in the United States National Recording Registry by the Library of Congress as being "culturally, historically, or aesthetically significant."

== Charts ==
Chart (1962)	Peak position
Australia	3
Canada	1
New Zealand (Lever Hit Parade)	1
UK Singles Chart	8
US Billboard Hot 100	1
US R&B (Billboard)	1

== Certifications ==
Region	Certification	Certified units/sales
New Zealand (RMNZ)	Gold	15,000^{‡}
United Kingdom (BPI)	Silver	200,000^{‡}
^{‡} Sales+streaming figures based on certification alone.

== Reception ==
Valli recalled in 2026 that Detroit was the first city where the record became a regional hit. Not long after, "Sherry" drew the attention of WPOP in Hartford, Connecticut, a radio station known for its aggressive seeking out of new hit records; WPOP overnight host Joey Reynolds soon placed the record into heavy rotation. "Sherry" became the band's first nationally released single and their first number-one hit, reaching the top of the U.S. Billboard Hot 100 on September 15, 1962. It remained at number one for five consecutive weeks, and number one on the rhythm and blues (R&B) charts for one week. "Sherry" became the first single by the Four Seasons to go to number one on the R&B charts.

== Cover versions ==
- A version by British pop group the Red Squares became a hit in Scandinavia, reaching number five on the Danmarks Radio chart in Denmark during October 1966. In Sweden, their version peaked at number one on Tio i Topp for two weeks in January 1967, and reached number four on sales chart Kvällstoppen.
- A version of the song was later recorded and released by British singer/songwriter Adrian Baker. It was released in July 1975 along with "I Was Only Fooling" on the Magnet Records label (MAG 34).
- A version by Robert John entered Billboard's Hot Top 100 chart at position number 82 on October 25, 1980; it spent five weeks on the Top 100, peaking at number 70 on November 8, 1980.
- One version of the song was recorded by British pop group Dreamhouse, which appears on their debut album, and was released in 1998.

== Song in popular culture ==
The song appears on the soundtrack album of the films; The Wanderers (1979), Stealing Home (1988), and The Help (2011), as well as a television episode of Two and a Half Men.

As with most of the Four Seasons' hit records, "Sherry" is included in the jukebox musical about the Four Seasons, Jersey Boys, with Reynolds' stunt being used to lead into the song. (Reynolds went uncredited in the musical and was replaced by the fictional disc jockey Barry Belson, a fact that Reynolds resented.)
