= Rag Doll (The Four Seasons song) =

Single by the Four Seasons

from the album Rag Doll
- B-side: "Silence Is Golden" (from the album Born to Wander)
- Released: June 1964
- Genre: Pop rock; doo-wop; R&B
- Length: 2:54
- Label: Philips Records
- Songwriters: Bob Crewe; Bob Gaudio
- Producer: Bob Crewe

The Four Seasons singles chronology
"Alone" (1964)	"Rag Doll" (1964)	"Save It for Me" (1964)

"Rag Doll" is a popular song written by Bob Crewe and Bob Gaudio. It was recorded by the Four Seasons and released as a single in 1964.

== Background ==
According to songwriter Bob Gaudio, the recording was inspired by an occasion involving the homeless children who, at stop lights in the city, would run into the street and clean windshields for spare change. In the Hell's Kitchen, Manhattan neighborhood, a young girl with a dirty face and wearing ragged clothes approached Gaudio's automobile. When he reached into his wallet to pay her, he found that none of the notes were smaller than $10. He gave the girl a $10 bill. (Some accounts indicate that it was a $5 bill.) "The image of her stuck in my head until I wrote 'Rag Doll'", Gaudio recalled in a 2009 interview. Bassist and arranger Nick Massi considered the record to be his favorite of his work with the Seasons.

Billboard described the song as a "sentimental slow dance ballad." Cash Box described it as "a touching, cha cha beat opus...that the group serves up in their fabulous style" and that features the "hit sounds" of Frankie Valli. In 1989, critic Dave Marsh ranked "Rag Doll" at No. 401 on his list compiled in the book The Heart of Rock and Soul: The 1001 Greatest Singles Ever Made, being one of five songs by the Four Seasons included in the book. In 1997, Mojo also listed the song as one of the 'Bubbling Under' singles in its list of 'The 100 Greatest Singles Of All Time'.

== Accolades ==
In 2010, radio station WCBS-FM in New York City rated the Four Seasons' "Rag Doll" as the No. 1 song of all time, as voted on by its listeners.

== Cover ==
- In 1966 the band Pooh recorded the Italian version in the single entitled Quello che non sai (What you do not know), text by Antonietta De Simone, (Vedette, VVN 33114) for the album Per quelli come noi (For those like us) of the same year (Vedette, VRM 36033).

== B-Side ==
The B-side was the original version of "Silence Is Golden", also written by Crewe and Gaudio. In 1967, that song was covered by the English band the Tremeloes and peaked at No. 1 on the UK Singles Chart, No. 8 in Canada, and No. 11 on the US charts.

== Personnel ==
Source.

The Four Seasons

- Frankie Valli – lead vocals, harmony and backing vocals, handclaps
- Tommy DeVito – harmony and backing vocals, guitar, handclaps
- Nick Massi – harmony and backing vocals, bass, handclaps
- Bob Gaudio – harmony and backing vocals, Farfisa organ, handclaps

Additional musician and production staff

- Buddy Saltzman – drums, tambourine, African hair drum
- Bob Crewe – producer
- Lenny Stei – engineer

== Chart history ==
"Rag Doll" reached the top spot on the Billboard Hot 100 on July 18, 1964, and remained on top for two weeks. The song was also a No. 1 hit in Canada, and reached No. 2 in the UK and No. 4 in Ireland.

=== Weekly charts ===
Chart (1964)	Peak position
Australia (Kent Music Report)	3
Canada RPM Top Forty-5s(4 weeks)	1
Ireland (IRMA)	4
New Zealand (Lever Hit Parade)	3
UK (Record Retailer)	2
US Billboard Hot 100	1
US Cash Box Top 100	1

=== Year-end charts ===
Chart (1964)	Rank
UK	33
US Billboard Hot 100	24
US Cash Box Top 100	29

== Certifications ==
Certifications for "Rag Doll"
Region	Certification	Certified units/sales
United States (RIAA)	Gold	1,000,000^{^}
^{^} Shipments figures based on certification alone.
