= Bob Gaudio =

American songwriter and musician (b. 1942)

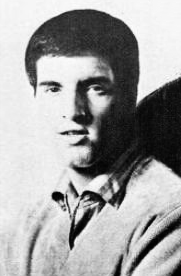
- Gaudio in 1966

Background information
- Born: Robert John Gaudio; November 17, 1942 (age 83); The Bronx, New York, U.S.
- Origin: Bergenfield, New Jersey, U.S.
- Genres: Rock; pop
- Occupations: Musician; songwriter; record producer
- Instruments: Keyboards; vocals
- Years active: 1958–present
- Member of: The Four Seasons
- Formerly of: The Four Lovers; The Royal Teens

Robert John Gaudio (born November 17, 1942) is an American singer, songwriter, musician, and record producer, best known mainly as the keyboardist and backing vocalist of the 1960s pop rock band The Four Seasons. Gaudio wrote or co-wrote the vast majority of the group's music, including hits like "Sherry" and "December, 1963 (Oh, What a Night)", as well as "Can't Take My Eyes Off You" for Frankie Valli. Though he no longer performs with the band, Gaudio and lead singer Valli remain co-owners of "the Four Seasons" brand.

== Biography ==
=== Family and school ===
Born in The Bronx, New York, Gaudio was raised in Bergenfield, New Jersey, where he attended Bergenfield High School. His mother worked for the publishing house Prentice Hall and his father in a paper factory. He showed an interest in music and studied piano with Sal Mosca.

He grew up in more comfortable middle-class surroundings than the other members of the Four Seasons, which caused some tension and differences early on. He was a cerebral person, interested in reading and learning. He stayed out of trouble and had a mild manner, which proved useful during negotiations throughout his career.

=== Early career ===
He rose to musical fame at the age of 15 as a member of The Royal Teens, for whom he co-wrote the hit "Short Shorts". In 1958, while he and the group were promoting the single, they met Frankie Valli and his group The Four Lovers as they prepared to perform on a local television program. Wearying of touring, Gaudio left the Royal Teens soon afterward.

One year after he ceased touring, Gaudio joined the Four Lovers. While commercial success was elusive, the group was kept busy with session work (with Bob Crewe as the record producer), and a string of performances at night clubs and lounges.

=== The Four Seasons Era ===
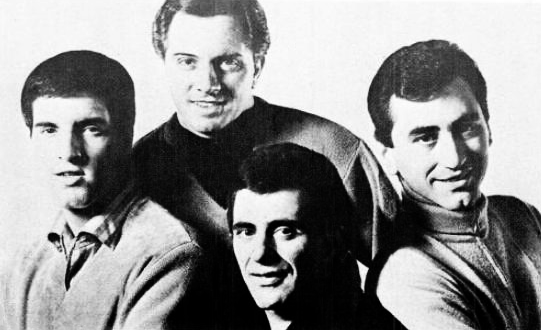
Gaudio (left) with The Four Seasons in 1966

In 1960, after a failed audition at a bowling establishment in Union Township called the "4 Seasons", songwriter/pianist Gaudio shook hands with lead singer Frankie Valli forming "the Four Seasons Partnership", so Gaudio, Valli, Tommy DeVito, and Nick Massi became The Four Seasons band.

In 1962, Valli and Gaudio shook hands on a side deal as well. As Gaudio told Time years later, "We said: ‘Neither one of us knows where we’re going to wind up, but maybe we should hedge our bets. You get 50% of me, and I get 50% of you‘". The partners eventually "divided well over $50 million on the strength of their original handshake".

Gaudio wrote the Four Seasons' first No. 1 hit, "Sherry", 15 minutes before a group rehearsal in 1962. With producer Bob Crewe often assisting with lyrics, Gaudio wrote a string of subsequent hits for the band, including "Big Girls Don't Cry", "Walk Like a Man", "Dawn (Go Away)", "Ronnie", "Rag Doll", "Save It for Me", "Big Man in Town", "Bye Bye Baby", "Girl Come Running", "Beggin'", and "Can't Take My Eyes Off You" (the first big success under Valli's name as a solo performer). Crewe/Gaudio compositions also became major hits for other artists, including The Tremeloes ("Silence Is Golden", originally the B-side of the Four Seasons' "Rag Doll"), The Osmonds ("The Proud One", originally recorded as a Valli solo single) and The Walker Brothers ("The Sun Ain't Gonna Shine Anymore", another Valli single).

After The Beatles' Sgt. Pepper's Lonely Hearts Club Band album was released in June 1967, Gaudio saw the pop music market changing, and sought to position the Four Seasons into the trend of socially conscious music. One evening he went to The Bitter End, a rock nightclub in Greenwich Village, New York, and saw Jake Holmes performing. Gaudio was taken with Holmes' song "Genuine Imitation Life" and decided to base a new LP for the band upon it. With Holmes as his new lyricist, The Genuine Imitation Life Gazette album was released in January 1969. However, it was a commercial failure and symbolized the end of the group's first period of success. The appreciation of The Genuine Imitation Life Gazette has grown over the years, and it was re-released on CD (minus the newspaper cover) in the 1990s by Rhino in the US and Ace in the UK. Gaudio and Holmes also wrote and produced Frank Sinatra's 1969 album Watertown.

Gaudio withdrew from touring in the early 1970s, a decision that fellow band member Joe Long indicated was due to stage fright and introversion. After short-lived stints with Al Ruzicka, Clay Jordan and Bill DeLoach as keyboardists, Lee Shapiro, who had idolized Gaudio as a child, would be hired as Gaudio's replacement. Gaudio continued to produce and write songs for the Four Seasons and to be also credited as a full member.

In 1975 Gaudio wrote "Who Loves You" and "December 1963 (Oh, What a Night)" with his future wife Judy Parker. The Bob and Judy songs became big hits for a new lineup of the Seasons, which by this point consisted of Valli, Shapiro, Gerry Polci, John Paiva and former The Critters frontman Don Ciccone.

Gaudio, Valli, Tommy DeVito and Nick Massi – the original members of The Four Seasons – were inducted into the Rock and Roll Hall of Fame in 1990, the Vocal Group Hall of Fame in 1999, and the New Jersey Hall of Fame in 2017 (which also inducted Long).

=== Other activities ===
In addition to his work for the Four Seasons and Sinatra, he wrote and/or produced for Michael Jackson, Barry Manilow, Diana Ross, Eric Carmen, Nancy Sinatra, Peabo Bryson, and Roberta Flack. In particular, he produced six complete albums for Neil Diamond, and the movie soundtrack albums for Diamond's The Jazz Singer and Little Shop of Horrors. Gaudio also produced the hit "You Don't Bring Me Flowers" for Barbra Streisand and Neil Diamond, a duet that reached the top of Billboard charts in 1978, for which he received a Grammy Award nomination.

In the 1990s Gaudio moved to Nashville and produced recordings for Canadian country artist George Fox, among others. He lured Neil Diamond to Nashville to record the album Tennessee Moon. Gaudio was inducted into the Songwriters Hall of Fame in 1995.

In recent years Gaudio has focused on musical theater, writing the music for the 2001 London West End production of Peggy Sue Got Married. Gaudio was instrumental in mounting Jersey Boys, a musical play based on the lives of the Four Seasons, which ran at the La Jolla Playhouse through January 2, 2005, and then opened on Broadway on November 6, 2005, to mostly positive reviews. In 2006, the play won four Tony Awards, including Best Musical, while in 2007, it won a Grammy in the Best Musical Show Album category. On February 3, 2009, Gaudio received his high school diploma, 50 years after dropping out of Bergenfield High School.

On May 12, 2012, Gaudio received the Ellis Island Medal of Honor for his commitment to many humanitarian causes. On June 20, 2014, Warner Bros. released, from the musical play, the film Jersey Boys, directed by Clint Eastwood, in which Gaudio was portrayed by Erich Bergen. Jersey Boys credits a then-teenaged Joe Pesci with introducing Gaudio to Tommy DeVito. On July 1, 2014, Rhino Entertainment released Audio with a G, the first compilation of the music composed by Bob Gaudio as performed by the Four Seasons, Frank Sinatra, Diana Ross, Roberta Flack, The Temptations, Cher, Nina Simone, Jerry Butler, Chuck Jackson and others.

Gaudio remains active in managing the Four Seasons catalog and consults with Primary Wave, a company Gaudio partnered with to manage the catalog in 2020, on each licensing request, with a spokesman for Primary Wave noting that Gaudio was more hands-on than most musicians in how he wanted the Four Seasons' music to be used, especially in advertising.

In 2022, Gaudio and Peggy Farina received credits as co-writer for the song "Burning" by Yeah Yeah Yeahs, which is driven by a piano loop inspired by their Four Seasons song "Beggin'". The lyric "Lay your red hand on me, baby" is an allusion to the opening line in "Beggin'", "put your lovin' hand out, baby". The song gained attention after it was used for the film Ruby Gillman, Teenage Kraken.

== Personal life ==
Gaudio was married to Brit Irene Olsen until the early 1970s. They had two daughters, Lisa and Danielle, and a son, Shannon. Near the end of their marriage, the two wrote three songs together, all of which have titles pertaining to a disconnected couple. Brit Olsen died in 1989, aged 47. Gaudio acknowledged: "I am hardly a model father, or grandfather for that matter". Danielle conceived the 2008 album Jersey Babys, a Four Seasons LP featuring the band's hits rearranged as instrumentals for young children's listening.

By 1975, Gaudio was in a relationship with Judy Parker, who would become his wife and regular songwriting collaborator. "December, 1963 (Oh, What a Night)" is, according to Gaudio, based upon an early encounter between the two. The two married in 1981 and remained so until Parker died September 14, 2017.

Gaudio married his long time Executive Personal Assistant, Debra Johnson Clements, now Debra Johnson Gaudio, on May 27, 2023 in Nashville, Tennessee.
