= List of songs written by Bob Crewe =

This is a list of songs written by Bob Crewe.

== Chart hits and other notable songs written by Bob Crewe ==
Year	Song	Original artist	Co-writer(s) with Crewe	^{U.S. Pop}	^{U.S. R&B}	^{UK Singles Chart}	Other charting versions, and notes
1957	"Silhouettes"	The Rays	Frank Slay	3	3	-	1957: Steve Gibson, #63 pop 1957: The Diamonds, #10 pop, #6 R&B; 1965: Herman's Hermits, #5 pop, #3 UK; 1981: The Futures, #79 R&B; 1990: Cliff Richard, #10 UK
1957	"Daddy Cool"	The Rays	Frank Slay	-	-	-	1977: Darts, #6 UK
1958	"La Dee Dah"	Billy & Lillie	Frank Slay	9	6	-	1958: Jackie Dennis, #4 UK
1958	"Happiness"	Billy & Lillie	Frank Slay	56	-	-	
1958	"Lucky Ladybug"	Billy & Lillie	Frank Slay	14	-	-	
1959	"Tallahassee Lassie"	Freddy Cannon	Frank Slay, Frederick Picariello	6	13	17	1959: Tommy Steele, #16 UK
1959	"Bells, Bells, Bells"	Billy & Lillie	Frank Slay	88	-	-	
1959	"Okefenokee"	Freddy Cannon	Frank Slay	43	-	-	
1960	"Mediterranean Moon "	The Rays	Frank Slay	95	-	-	
1960	"Jump Over"	Freddy Cannon	Frank Slay	28	-	-	
1960	"The Urge"	Freddy Cannon	Frank Slay	60	-	18	
1960	"Happy Shades of Blue"	Freddy Cannon	Frank Slay	83	-	-	
1960	"Humdinger"	Freddy Cannon	Frank Slay	59	-	-	
1961	"Pony Express "	Danny & the Juniors	Frank Slay	60	-	-	
1961	"Buzz Buzz A-Diddle-It"	Freddy Cannon	Frank Slay	51	-	-	1980: Matchbox, #22 UK
1961	"Magic Moon"	The Rays	Frank Slay	49	-	-	
1962	"Twistin' All Night Long"	Danny & the Juniors	Frank Slay	68	-	-	
1962	"Teen Queen of the Week"	Freddy Cannon	Frank Slay	92	-	-	
1962	"My Time for Crying"	Maxine Brown	Saul Bass	98	-	-	
1962	"Big Girls Don't Cry"	The Four Seasons	Bob Gaudio	1	1	13	1988: The Four Seasons, #91 UK (reissue)
1963	"Walk Like a Man"	The Four Seasons	Bob Gaudio	1	3	12	1985: Divine, #23 UK; 1986: The Mary Jane Girls, #41 pop, #91 R&B
1963	"Don't Mention My Name"	The Shepherd Sisters	Bob Gaudio	94	-	-	
1963	"Whatever You Want"	Jerry Butler	Bob Gaudio	68	-	-	
1963	"Soon (I'll Be Home Again) "	The Four Seasons	Bob Gaudio	77	-	-	
1963	"New Mexican Rose"	The Four Seasons	Charles Calello	36	-	-	
1963	"That's the Only Way"	The Four Seasons	Bob Boulanger	88	-	-	
1964	"Navy Blue"	Diane Renay	Bud Rehak, Eddie Rambeau	6	-	-	
1964	"Ronnie"	The Four Seasons	Bob Gaudio	6	-	-	
1964	"Across the Street"	Lenny O'Henry	Charles Calello, Valmond Harris	98	-	-	
1964	"Rag Doll"	The Four Seasons	Bob Gaudio	1	-	2	
1964	"Silence is Golden"	The Four Seasons	Bob Gaudio	-	-	-	1967: The Tremeloes, #11 pop, #1 UK
1964	"Knock! Knock! (Who's There)"	The Orlons	Larry Santos	64	23	-	
1964	"Save It for Me"	The Four Seasons	Bob Gaudio	10	-	-	
1964	"Society Girl"	The Rag Dolls	Sandy Linzer, Denny Randell	91	-	-	
1964	"Pushin' a Good Thing Too Far"	Barbara Lewis	Sandy Linzer, Denny Randell	-	47	-	
1965	"Bye, Bye, Baby (Baby Goodbye)"	The Four Seasons	Bob Gaudio	12	-	-	1967: The Symbols, #44 UK; 1975: The Bay City Rollers, #1 UK
1965	"Dusty"	The Rag Dolls	Sandy Linzer, Denny Randell	55	-	-	
1965	"Toy Soldier"	The Four Seasons	Bob Gaudio	64	-	-	
1965	"Girl Come Running"	The Four Seasons	Bob Gaudio	30	-	-	
1965	"Let's Hang On"	The Four Seasons	Sandy Linzer, Denny Randell	3	-	4	1969: The Bandwagon, #36 UK; 1980, Darts, #11 UK; 1981: Barry Manilow, #32 pop, #12 UK
1965	"The Sun Ain't Gonna Shine (Anymore)"	Frankie Valli	Bob Gaudio	-	-	-	1966: The Walker Brothers, #13 pop, #1 UK; 1981: Nielsen/Pearson, #56 pop 1989: David Essex, #90 UK; 1996: Cher, #26 UK
1965	"Jenny Take a Ride"	Mitch Ryder & the Detroit Wheels	Richard Penniman, Enotris Johnson	10	-	33	Medley of Little Richard's "Jenny, Jenny" and "C. C. Rider"
1966	"(You're Gonna) Hurt Yourself"	Frankie Valli	Charles Calello	39	-	-	
1966	"You're Ready Now"	Frankie Valli	Bob Gaudio	-	-	-	1970: Frankie Valli, #11 UK (reissue)
1966	"Takin' All I Can Get"	Mitch Ryder & the Detroit Wheels	Gary Knight	100	-	-	
1966	"The Proud One"	Frankie Valli	Bob Gaudio	68	-	-	1975: The Osmonds, #22 pop, #5 UK
1967	"Sock It to Me Baby!"	Mitch Ryder & the Detroit Wheels	L. Russell Brown	6	-	-	
1967	"Can't Take My Eyes off You"	Frankie Valli	Bob Gaudio	2	-	-	1967: The Lettermen, "Goin' Out of My Head / Can't Take My Eyes Off You ", #7 pop 1968: Andy Williams, #5 UK; 1969: Nancy Wilson, #52 pop, #27 R&B; 1982: Boys Town Gang, #4 UK; 1996: Boys Town Gang #97 UK (reissue); 1998: Lauryn Hill, #35 pop, #45 R&B; 1999: Andy Williams, #9 UK (reissue); 2002: Andy Williams and Denise van Outen, #23 UK
1967	"Summer and Sandy"	Lesley Gore	L. Russell Brown, Raymond Bloodworth	65	-	-	
1967	"I Make a Fool of Myself"	Frankie Valli	Bob Gaudio	18	-	-	
1967	"More Than the Eye Can See"	Al Martino	Larry Weiss	54	-	-	
1967	"Birds of Britain"	The Bob Crewe Generation	Hutch Davie	89	-	-	
1967	"To Give (The Reason I Live)"	Frankie Valli	Bob Gaudio	29	-	-	
1969	"Eternity"	Vicki Carr	Charles Fox	79	-	-	
1969	"Me and You"	O. C. Smith	Bob Gaudio	-	38	-	
1970	"I Can't Take It Like a Man"	Ben E. King	Larry Weiss, John Williams	-	45	-	
1974	"So Good"	The Eleventh Hour	Kenny Nolan	94	-	-	
1974	"Get Dancin'"	Disco-Tex and the Sex-O-Lettes	Kenny Nolan	10	32	8	
1974	"My Eyes Adored You"	Frankie Valli	Kenny Nolan	1	-	5	
1975	"Far As We Felt Like Goin'"	Labelle	Kenny Nolan	-	99	-	
1975	"Lady Marmalade'"	Labelle	Kenny Nolan	1	1	17	1998: All Saints, "Under the Bridge / Lady Marmalade", #1 UK; 1998: Philly Beats, "Voulez Vous", #84 UK; 2001: Christina Aguilera, Lil' Kim, Mýa and Pink, #1 pop, #43 R&B, #1 UK
1975	"I Wanna Dance Wit' Choo (Doo Dat Dance)"	Disco-Tex and the Sex-O-Lettes	Denny Randell	23	33	6	
1975	"Swearin' to God"	Frankie Valli	Denny Randell	6	31	31	
1975	"Hollywood Hot"	The Eleventh Hour	Cidny Bullens	55	45	-	
1975	"Jam Band"	Disco-Tex and the Sex-O-Lettes	Denny Randell	80	-	-	
1975	"Boogie Flap"	Disco-Tex and the Sex-O-Lettes	Kenny Nolan	-	-	51	
1976	"Street Talk"	The Bob Crewe Generation	Cidny Bullens	56	-	-	
1979	"Fancy Dancer"	Frankie Valli	L. Russell Brown	77	-	-	
1983	"Heaven Above Me"	Roberta Flack and Peabo Bryson	Bob Gaudio	-	-	84	
1983	"You're Looking Like Love to Me"	Roberta Flack and Peabo Bryson	Bob Gaudio, Jerry Corbetta	58	41	-	
