= The Toys Sing "A Lover's Concerto" and "Attack!" =

The Toys Sing “A Lover's Concerto” and “Attack!”

Studio album by The Toys
- Released: 1966
- Recorded: 1965–1966
- Genre: Pop, R&B
- Label: DynoVoice
- Producer: Sandy Linzer, Denny Randell

The Toys Sing "A Lover's Concerto" and "Attack!" is the sole album by the girl group The Toys. It was released in 1966 right after the success of the group's first two hits, both of which are mentioned in the album's title.

“Yesterday” is the only cover song on the album. The rest of the tracks are all original material that were written by the Toys' producers, Sandy Linzer and Denny Randell.

Although Barbara Harris sang lead for the majority of the album (the group's producers felt that her voice was the most commercial), Barbara Parritt and June Montiero are each given a chance to sing lead as well, the former on “Hallelujah” and the latter on “Yesterday”. Parritt and Harris share the lead vocal duties on "Back Street."

The album was re-released on November 1, 1994 on CD by Sundazed Music. The CD version was produced by Bob Irwin and included two bonus tracks (“Baby Toys” and “May My Heart Be Cast into Stone”), both of which were released as singles following the album. According to Barbara Harris, these two songs were intended to be featured on The Toys' second album, which was never released.

== Track listing ==
All tracks composed by Sandy Linzer and Denny Randell; except where indicated

Side 1
No.	Title	Length
1.	"Can't Get Enough of You Baby"	2:41
2.	"Deserted"	2:34
3.	"See How They Run"	3:13
4.	"Hallelujah"	2:31
5.	"I Got a Man"	2:20
6.	"A Lover's Concerto (JS Bach or Petzold, Linzer, Randell)"	2:34

Side 2
No.	Title	Length
1.	"What's Wrong With Me Baby"	2:32
2.	"Yesterday" (Paul McCartney, John Lennon)	2:21
3.	"Baby's Gone"	2:29
4.	"This Night"	2:53
5.	"Back Street"	2:40
6.	"Attack"	3:03

CD bonus tracks

- "Baby Toys" (Sandy Linzer, Denny Randell, Decilis, Layton) - 3:11
- "May My Heart Be Cast into Stone" - 2:41

== Album credits ==
- Produced by: Sandy Linzer and Denny Randell for Bob Crewe Productions
- CD version produced by: Bob Irwin

== Charts ==
Year	Chart	Position
1966	The Billboard 200	92
1966	Black Albums	9
