= Navy Blue (album) =

Studio album by Diane Renay
- Released: 1964
- Genre: Pop
- Length: 37:19
- Label: Collectables
- Producer: Bob Crewe

Singles from Navy Blue
- 1. "Navy Blue" Released: 1964; 2. "Kiss Me Sailor" Released: 1964

"Navy Blue" is the only studio album by American performer Diane Renay, released in 1964. It included two Top 40 hits, "Navy Blue" and "Kiss Me Sailor."

== Release ==
The album was released in 1964 following the worldwide success of "Navy Blue." It reached number 54 on the Billboard Top LPs chart (now called The Billboard Hot 200), spending 11 weeks on the chart.

Both of the album's singles were featured on the girl-group anthology "Growin' Up Too Fast."

== Critical reception ==
The album is retrospectively regarded as a girl-pop classic.

== Track listing ==
Side one
No.	Title	Writer(s)	Length
1.	"Kiss Me Sailor"	Eddie Rambeau	2:48
2.	"Soft-Spoken Guy"	Eddie Rambeau; Bob Crewe	2:48
3.	"Please Forget Me"	Bob Crewe	3:15
4.	"Hello Heartaches"	Bob Crewe; Sid Bass	2:51
5.	"Man of Mystery"	Bob Crewe; Charles Calello	2:29
6.	"Navy Blue"	Eddie Rambeau; Bob Crewe; Bud Rehak	2:28

Side two
No.	Title	Writer(s)	Length
1.	"Bell Bottom Trousers"	Moe Jaffe	2:56
2.	"Soldier Boy"	Luther Dixon; Florence Greenberg	2:51
3.	"A Present from Eddie"	Eddie Rambeau; Bob Crewe	2:59
4.	"Sooner or Later"	Bob Crewe	2:01
5.	"He Promised Me Forevermore"	Bob Crewe; Sandy Linzer	2:23
6.	"Unbelievable Guy"	Bob Crewe; Sandy Linzer; Denny Randell	2:45

Chart (1964)	Peak position
US Top LPs	54
