= Kiss Me Sailor =

Single by Diane Renay

from the album Navy Blue
- B-side: "Soft-Spoken Guy"
- Released: 1964
- Recorded: 1964
- Genre: Pop
- Length: 2:25
- Label: 20th Century Fox Records – R4KM 4415
- Songwriter(s): Eddie Rambeau, Bud Rehak
- Producer(s): Bob Crewe

Diane Renay singles chronology
"Navy Blue" (1963)	"Kiss Me Sailor" (1964)	"Growin' Up Too Fast" (1964)

"Kiss Me Sailor" is a song by American recording artist Diane Renay, written by Eddie Rambeau and Bud Rehak. It was released as the fourth single from her debut album, "Navy Blue", and was intended as a sequel song to her previous hit, "Navy Blue".

== Background ==
"Kiss Me Sailor" was included on her debut album, "Navy Blue". It was intended as a sequel song, to pick up where her song "Navy Blue" had left off. Renay commented in an interview with Gary James that she refers to the song as "Navy Blue Chapter 2", and that she preferred "Sailor" to "Navy Blue".

== Release ==
The song was released on 45, with a B-side titled "Soft-Spoken Guy".

== Chart performance ==
"Kiss Me Sailor" debuted on the Billboard Hot 100 on the chart dated 4 April 1964, at number 90. Six weeks later, it peaked at number 29. The song spent a total of 8 weeks on the Hot 100. In Canada it reached number 13.
