= Navy blue (disambiguation) =

Navy blue is a color.

Navy Blue(s) may also refer to:

== Film and television ==
- Navy Blues (1923 film), an American silent film directed by Harold Beaudine
- Navy Blues (1929 film), an American film directed by Clarence Brown
- Navy Blues (1937 film), an American film directed by Ralph Staub
- Navy Blues (1941 film), an American film directed by Lloyd Bacon
- "Navy Blues" (Law & Order), a television episode

== Music ==
- Navy Blue (album), by Diane Renay, 1964
- Navy Blues (album), by Sloan, 1998
- "Navy Blue" (Diane Renay song), 1964
- "Navy Blue" (Rina Aiuchi song), 2001
- Navy Blue (Charlotte Lawrence song), 2019
- "Navy Blue", a 2019 song by MUNA from Saves the World
- "Navy Blue", a 2014 song by The Story So Far from Songs Of
- Navy Blue (rapper), Sage Elsesser (born 1997), American skateboarder, rapper, and model

== Other ==
- Navy Blue (pigeon), received the Dickin Medal for bravery in World War II
