= Monti Rock III =

American musician and performer (1939–2026)

Sir Monti Rock III
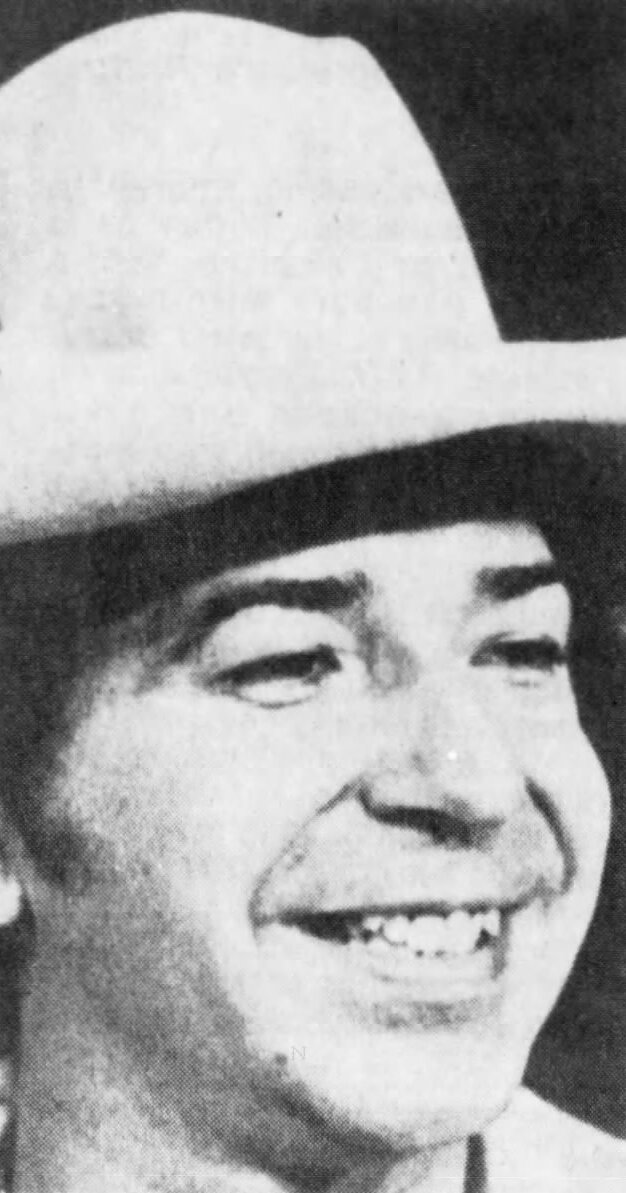
- Rock circa 1981

Background information
- Born: Joseph Moses Montanez Jr. May 29, 1939; New York City, U.S.
- Died: February 23, 2026 (aged 86) Las Vegas, Nevada, U.S.

Joseph Moses Montanez Jr. (May 29, 1939 – February 23, 2026), known professionally as Sir Monti Rock III, was an American hairdresser, musician and performer.

== Life and career ==
=== Early life and first appearances on television ===
Joseph Montanez Jr. was born on May 29, 1939, to a Puerto Rican family in The Bronx, New York City. His parents disowned him for his homosexuality. His primary vocation was as a hairdresser; he remarked that despite his later dabbling in entertainment, he considered hairdressing to be what he did best.

While his hairdressing work for models in the 1960s and flamboyance first led to appearances on The Merv Griffin Show beginning in 1966, Rock's personality brought him to the national stage when he began appearing regularly as a guest on The Tonight Show. He compared his "famous for being famous" status to what would later be seen on reality television. He acknowledged the similarity in his act to that of Liberace, who he jokingly claimed "stole (his) act", and noted that Charles Nelson Reilly "hated (him)".

=== The Disco era with his band: "Disco-Tex and the Sex-O-Lettes" ===
Rock is generally considered to be one of the first disco artists to cross into the mainstream. In February 1975, producer Bob Crewe created a persona for him, which became Disco-Tex and the Sex-O-Lettes. Two of the tracks from the Disco Tex and His Sex-O-Lettes Review album, "Get Dancin'" and "I Wanna Dance Wit' Choo (Doo Dat Dance)", became hit singles in the United States and instant staples at burgeoning New York City dance clubs including Studio 54. The two songs were also Top 10 hits in the United Kingdom. By the end of the 1970s, Disco music was fully mainstream, and Rock also appeared in the movie Saturday Night Fever as the DJ.

Dolly Parton mentioned him in her song for Johnny Carson called "The Johnny Carson Show"; the lyrics said: "Now there's only one small problem, sometimes I get disturbed, Folks sometimes get me confused with Monti Rock the Third"

As a running gag, he often incremented the Roman numeral suffix after his stage name "Monti Rock" (eventually up to Monti Rock VI) with each "reinvention" before dropping the gag later in life. He later resided and performed in Las Vegas, where he penned a gossip column. His career largely failed in the 1990s, which he attributed to homosexuality entering the mainstream and his act no longer being so unique, but he continued to make appearances as a supporting act. By 2017, he had largely retreated from the public spotlight.

== Personal life and death ==
Rock was openly gay from the time he came out at age 13. His partner, Bruce Moshman, died in the mid-2010s. Rock died from complications of COPD at his home in Las Vegas on February 23, 2026, at the age of 86. He had largely been bedridden since breaking his hip in December 2024.
