= Chicago Loop (disambiguation) =

The Chicago Loop is the local name for the historical center of downtown Chicago.

Chicago Loop may also refer to:

- Chicago Loop (plumbing), alternate name of a kitchen island sink waste plumbing installation
- The Loop (CTA)
- Chicago Loop (band), a 1960s rock group
- Chicago Loop (film), a 1976 short film by James Benning
- Chicago Loop (novel), a novel by Paul Theroux
