= Christian Petzold =

Christian Petzold may refer to:

- Christian Petzold (composer) (1677–1733), German composer and organist
- Christian Petzold (director) (born 1960), German film director
