= Concrete and Clay =

1965 single by Unit 4 + 2

Single by Unit 4 + 2
- B-side: "When I Fall in Love"
- Released: February 1965
- Studio: Recorded Sounds, London
- Genre: Folk rock; baião
- Length: 2:20
- Label: Decca F12071 (UK), London (US and Canada)
- Songwriters: Tommy Moeller, Brian Parker
- Producer: John L. Barker

Unit 4 + 2 singles chronology
"Sorrow and Pain" (1964)	"Concrete and Clay" (1965)	"(You've) Never Been in Love Like This Before" (1965)

"Concrete and Clay" is a 1965 hit single recorded by the UK pop group Unit 4 + 2. It reached No. 1 on the UK Singles Chart in April 1965. The song was written by group members Tommy Moeller and Brian Parker. It was also a top 40 hit for Eddie Rambeau in 1965.

== Background ==
Recorded with the help of session musicians and featuring ("+2") Russ Ballard and Bob Henrit, the lyrics detail the indestructible love of the singer and his lover. The arrangement has a pronounced Latin influence, using acoustic guitars and a baião beat. These distinctive elements helped boost "Concrete and Clay" to the No. 1 position on the UK Singles Chart in April 1965.

== Music video ==
A British Pathé promotional video for "Concrete and Clay" was filmed in 1965 on the construction site of the Barbican Estate, a residential complex that was to become a prominent example of concrete Brutalist architecture. The clip features the group performing among the cranes, sand heaps and scaffoldings of the vast site prior to the complex's completion.

== Chart performance ==
American record producer Bob Crewe, best known for his work with the Four Seasons, had heard the Unit 4 + 2 hit version of "Concrete and Clay" while on a trip to the UK. As a result, Crewe had a cover version of "Concrete and Clay" cut by Eddie Rambeau, a staff writer at Crewe's music publishing firm, which was the inaugural release for Crewe's own DynoVoice Records. Although the Rambeau version's release pre-dated the US release of the Unit 4 + 2 version by one week, both singles debuted on the Billboard Hot 100 dated 8 May 1965; Unit 4 + 2 at No. 96 and Rambeau at No. 98, with both singles making a similar chart ascent over the next four weeks. The original eventually peaked at No. 28 while Rambeau's version reached No. 35. In Canada's RPM Magazine the two versions were co-charted, both reaching number 1 on May 17, 1965.

=== Unit 4 + 2 ===
Chart (1965)	Peak position
U.K. Singles Chart	1
U.S. Billboard Hot 100	28
U.S. Billboard Easy Listening	9

=== Eddie Rambeau ===
Chart (1965)	Peak position
U.S. Billboard Hot 100	35
U.S. Billboard Easy Listening	13

== Other cover versions ==
- Featured on albums by Gary Lewis and the Playboys (A Session with Gary Lewis and the Playboys/ 1965)
- Cliff Richard (Kinda Latin/ 1966)
- "Concrete and Clay" was remade by Randy Edelman for his 1976 album release Farewell Fairbanks which otherwise comprised Edelman originals. Issued as a single, Edelman's "Concrete and Clay" became a UK hit reaching No. 11 in March 1976. In Canada the song reached No. 32 on the AC Charts.
- In 1986, a remake of "Concrete and Clay" by Martin Plaza, co-lead vocalist of the group Mental as Anything, reached No. 2 in Australia and was the 23rd biggest selling single in Australia in 1986.
- Also in 1986, a remake by Hong Kong Syndikat reached No. 26 in Germany, and also reached No. 12 in France in 1987.
- Former Dexys Midnight Runners singer Kevin Rowland released a version in 1999
- Pete Byrne also covered the song on his 2001 solo album The Real Illusion.
- They Might Be Giants attempted a version of the song in 1990. The uncompleted track was released as an MP3 in 2001.
- "Concrete and Clay" was also covered on a 1983 EP by Los Angeles band Doll Congress, featuring Michael Penn and keyboardist Patrick Warren.
- The 1967 album Music to Watch Girls By by the Bob Crewe Generation features instrumental versions of several Bob Crewe produced hits, including "Concrete and Clay".
- On 28 October 2011, a new version of "Concrete And Clay" by original singer and co-writer Tommy Moeller was released on the Chance Music record label based in Sydney Australia, 47 years after his original version in 1964.
- The Tommy Moeller album Time is dedicated to "Concrete And Clay" co-writer Brian Parker (1939–2001), and includes three other songs by Moeller and Parker. The cover of the album shows Tommy Moeller at age 19 when he first sang "Concrete And Clay", and in 2011 when the new version by Chance Music was released.
- Another version from 1973 was recorded by British teenage singer Darren Burn. It failed to chart.
- A Finnish rock band YUP did a cover version "Maa Alla Horjuu" (lit. "The Ground Is Shaking") in 2001 for their re-recordings and covers -album of "Hajoita ja hallitse" (lit. "Divide and rule").
- The Honeycombs recorded a cover in 1965-66 that was not released until 2022.

=== International cover versions ===
The success of "Concrete and Clay" in 1965 resulted in international cover versions that same year, with renderings in:

- Swedish – "Du för mig" recorded by Lill Lindfors
- Finnish – "Tunti Vain" recorded by Johnny
- French – "Comment Elle-Fait" recorded by Richard Anthony
- German – "Ein Fremder kam vorbei" recorded by Horst Wiegand.

== Popular culture ==
- The Unit 4 + 2 version was featured in the 1998 film Rushmore and was included on its accompanying soundtrack album.
- "Concrete and Clay" also featured in a Signal White NOW toothpaste commercial.

== See also ==
- List of UK Singles Chart number ones of the 1960s
