= Unit 4 + 2 =

British pop band

- Origin: Hertfordshire, England
- Genres: Pop rock
- Years active: 1963–1970
- Labels: Decca Records; Fontana Records
- Past members: Brian Parker; Tommy Moeller; Buster Meikle; Peter Moules; Howard 'Lem' Lubin; Rod 'Humble' Garwood; Hugh Halliday; Nigel Snook; Russ Ballard; Bob Henrit; Mike Davids; Glyn Havard (live only); Tony Duhig (live only); Allan Price (live only); Iain Hines (live only)

Unit 4 + 2 were a British pop band formed in Hertfordshire, England, who had a number one hit on the UK Singles Chart in 1965 with the song "Concrete and Clay". The track topped the UK chart for one week.

== Career ==
=== Early days ===
In 1962, Brian Parker, then the guitar player and songwriter with the Hunters, decided to form his own vocal harmony group. He asked his friend David 'Buster' Meikle to join him. They asked singer Tommy Moeller and Peter Moules, who were at school together, to join their group, which they called Unit 4, reportedly inspired by "Unit 4," the fourth and final segment of the BBC Radio show Pick of the Pops, which featured the Top 10.

Unit 4 was later joined by Russ Ballard on guitar and Robert 'Bob' Henrit on drums (forming the + 2) for a six-piece, four-part vocal harmony group. Moeller was lead singer and front man from the first show as the Unit 4 vocal group to the last show as Unit 4 + 2 as vocal group with instruments. Owing to ill health and a dislike of performing live, Brian Parker left the band but remained involved as co-songwriter with Tommy Moeller for all of the band's original recordings. His place at live performances was taken by Howard 'Lem' Lubin. Around 1967 when they recorded their second album, Rodney Garwood replaced Peter Moules (who had taken up bass when the band changed from a vocal group to a pop band) on bass and Hugh Halliday replaced Bob Henrit.

As Unit 4 + 2, they issued their debut single on Decca Records titled "The Green Fields" (featuring the only performance with the band of banjo player Nigel Snook), which reached number 48 in the UK in 1964. Their second single release, "Sorrow and Pain", was less successful.

Brian Parker co-wrote "Sea of Faces" with Kim Fowley for Unit 4 + 2 when he was living in England with P.J. Proby. The group recorded the song but it never saw a release. Another group, The Ways and Means who were managed by Ron Fairway recorded it and it was released on Pye. It became a minor hit for the band, charting on the Radio City and Radio Caroline charts in early 1967.

=== Success ===
Unit 4 + 2's song "Concrete and Clay" became a big hit the following year, reportedly thanks to exposure on pirate radio stations, most notably Wonderful Radio London. Tony Windsor, the radio station's music director, later recalled in an interview that he initially rejected the song for the station's playlist, but was persuaded to change his mind by DJ Kenny Everett. The song was recorded with session musicians Russ Ballard and Bob Henrit (who had played with the Roulettes). As well as reaching the top of the UK chart, "Concrete and Clay" was popular worldwide. In the United States, a competing cover version by Eddie Rambeau (produced by Bob Crewe) split sales, with Rambeau's reaching No. 35 on the Billboard Hot 100 and Unit 4 + 2's peaking at No. 28. Cashbox bracketed the two competing versions together on its chart, and they reached a combined peak of No. 12.

Decca released a hastily put together album, titled 1st Album. The next single release, "(You've) Never Been in Love Like This Before", reached the top 20 in the UK, and No. 95 on the Billboard Hot 100 in the US.

In 1967, Russ Ballard (who, with Henrit, went on to form Argent) joined the band full-time, having played some of the guitar work with Brian Parker on the original recording for "Concrete and Clay".

=== Later years ===
Unit 4 + 2 released 10 singles on Decca between 1964 and 1967, including one four-track EP, and many of the songs ended up on 1st Album. The album later changed in title, cover art and track listing and was re-released as #1 featuring Concrete and Clay. Also, singles that became hits, such as the fifth single "(You've) Never Been in Love Like This Before", were not on the 1st Album but were added on the re-released version.

Hugh Halliday replaced Bob Henrit for the second and final album in 1967 on Fontana Records. With Ballard and Henrit on board as full-time members, the Unit 4 + 2 sound had gelled, but their cover of Bob Dylan's "You Ain't Goin' Nowhere" was outsold by a cover version by the Byrds. Their last single, "3.30", used electric piano and other orchestration. The song appears on the 1984 compilation album The 49 Minute Technicolor Dream. "I Will", the B-side, appeared on the 1984 compilation album The Psychedelic Snarl. "3.30" failed to chart, and with their next album, Unit 4 + 2, also failing to chart, the group broke up in 1970.

Unit 4 + 2 released six more singles on Fontana up to 1969, disbanding in 1970. One of the Fontana releases was for Spain and was a reissue of the four tracks from two previous singles as one EP. They briefly resurfaced for a tour of UK clubs during 1970 with Tommy Moeller remaining as the front man, but with an entirely new backing band. This was made up of Glyn Havard (bass and vocals), Allan Price (drums and vocals), Iain Hines (keyboards and vocals and Tony Duhig (guitar). The band existed for approximately two months and then disbanded again. Havard, Duhig and Price went on to play in avant-garde progressive group "Jade Warrior".

=== Cover versions ===
"Concrete and Clay" returned to the top 20 of the UK Singles Chart in 1976, courtesy of Randy Edelman's cover version. The song appeared on the soundtrack to the 1999 film Rushmore.

Martin Plaza, co-lead vocalist of Australian band Mental As Anything, released his version as his debut solo single in 1986, from his debut solo album Plaza Suite. It reached number 2 on the Australian charts.

== Band member details ==
Brian Parker (born Brian William Parker, 7 December 1939, Cheshunt, Hertfordshire, died 17 February 2001) - vocals, guitar:

- Later taught guitar playing in his local area, but died while playing tennis in 2001. Co-writer of "Concrete and Clay".

Tommy Moeller (born Thomas John George Moeller, 23 February 1945, Liverpool) - lead vocalist, guitar, piano:

- He is the brother of Billy Moeller, who became public face of Whistling Jack Smith, and took "I Was Kaiser Bill's Batman" to number five in 1967. Co-writer of "Concrete and Clay".

David Ian 'Buster' Meikle (born 1 March 1942, Goff's Oak, Hertfordshire) - vocals, guitar:

- Former lead singer of Buster Meikle & the Day Breakers (which included Russ Ballard, Roy Ballard, Russ's older brother on keyboards and Bob Henrit) and a founding member of Unit 4 + 2. Left in 1967 and had chart success overseas as half of Bill & Buster, along with Billy Moeller. Now living in Norfolk.

Peter Charles Moules (born 14 October 1944, Barnet, Hertfordshire) - bass:

- He was replaced by Rodney Garwood on bass for the second Unit 4 + 2 album on Fontana.

Bob Henrit:

- Performed as a session drummer on "Concrete and Clay". He joined as a regular member in 1967, also from the Roulettes. He replaced the long-serving drummer of the Kinks, Mick Avory, after Avory's departure in 1984. He worked with the act until their seemingly final demise in 1996.

Howard 'Lem' Lubin (born 20 January 1944, Hampton Court, Middlesex):

- Replaced Parker for live performances in the group's early days. Was a member of Satisfaction and then Christie, before becoming a record producer.

Hugh Maitland Halliday (born 29 December 1944) - drums:

- Joined in 1965, replacing original drummer Bob Henrit. He subsequently became a dancer, and then an opera director with English National Opera, Victoria State Opera, Melbourne Opera, and other Asian, Australian and New Zealand opera companies.

Nigel Ian Norman Snook (born 26 February 1944, Poole, Dorset; died 5 November 2007):

- Played banjo on the first single "The Green Fields".

Russ Ballard:

- He came from Waltham Cross, joined in 1967 from Adam Faith's one-time backing ensemble the Roulettes. He later joined Argent and became and remains a successful songwriter and performer

Rodney John 'Humble' Garwood (born 27 March 1944, Diss, Norfolk) - bass guitar:

- Joined in 1967.

== Discography ==
=== Albums ===
- 1st Album (1965), Decca (LK 4697) (later re-released on London label with new artwork as album title #1 featuring Concrete and Clay, with "500 Miles", "You've Lost That Lovin' Feelin'" and "Swing Down Chariot" being replaced by "Tell Somebody You Know", "(You've) Never Been in Love Like This Before" and "Woman from Liberia")
- Unit 4 + 2 (1969)

=== Singles ===
Year	Single	Chart Positions			
Year	Single	UK	AU	CAN	US
1964	"The Green Fields"	48	-	-	-
1964	"Sorrow and Pain"	-	-	-	-
1965	"Concrete and Clay"	1	21	1	28
1965	"(You've) Never Been in Love Like This Before"	14	38	6	95
1965	"Hark"	-	-	-	131
1965	"You've Got to Be Cruel to Be Kind"	-	-	-	-
1966	"Baby Never Say Goodbye"	49	-	-	-
1967	"I Was Only Playing Games"	-	-	-	-
1967	"Too Fast, Too Slow"	-	-	-	-
1967	"Butterfly"	-	-	-	-
1968	"You Ain't Goin' Nowhere"	-	-	-	-
1969	"3:30"	-	-	-	-

== See also ==
- List of artists under the Decca Records label
- List of artists who reached number one on the UK Singles Chart
- List of 1960s one-hit wonders in the United States
- List of performers on Top of the Pops

== Bibliography ==
- 40 Years of NME Charts, by Roger Osborne, Dafydd Rees and Barry Lazell, Boxtree Limited, First Edition. 1992 - ISBN 1-85283-746-2
