= Chicago Loop (band) =

American rock group

The Chicago Loop was an American rock group from Chicago, Illinois, United States. The group, formed in 1966, consisted of Bob Slawson (vocals), Judy Novy (vocals), John Savanna, alternate touring (guitar), Barry Goldberg (piano), Carmine Riale (bass), and John Siomos (drums). In 1966, they released the single, "(When She Needs Good Lovin') She Comes to Me" b/w "This Must Be the Place" on DynoVoice Records. Some of the pressings of the single had an alternate title, "(When She Wants Good Lovin') My Baby Comes to Me". The song hit No. 37 on the Billboard Hot 100 late in 1966. The recording featured some notable session musicians; lead guitar was Michael Bloomfield, and the keyboard player was Barry Goldberg. Bob Crewe was the producer, and Riale, Slawson, and Siomos also formed the rhythm section of the touring group The Mitch Ryder Show, Ryder's first solo tour after breaking with the Detroit Wheels.
