= Native New Yorker (song) =

Single by Odyssey

from the album Odyssey
- B-side: "Ever Lovin' Sam"
- Released: September 1977
- Recorded: 1977; House of Music, West Orange, New Jersey
- Genre: Disco
- Length: 3:29 (Single Version); 5:35 (Disco Version)
- Label: RCA Victor
- Songwriters: Sandy Linzer; Denny Randell
- Producers: Charlie Calello; Sandy Linzer

Official audio
- "Native New Yorker" on YouTube

"Native New Yorker" is a disco song written by Sandy Linzer and Denny Randell. It was first released in September 1977 by the soul dance band Odyssey. Odyssey's version became a hit single, reaching No. 3 on the U.S. disco chart. It also went to No. 6 on the soul chart and No. 21 on the Billboard Hot 100. It reached No. 5 on the UK Singles Chart.

The group recorded the song at House of Music in West Orange, New Jersey. Jeffrey Kawalek was the recording and mix engineer. Richard Tee played its signature piano track. Jim Bonnefond assisted on many sessions. Studio owner Charlie Conrad did additional engineering, and added additional instrumental solos to the original mixes to create extended dance versions. Sandy Linzer added Tommy Mandel on clavinet and played hair drum himself on the mix that would be released as a single, engineered by Billy Radice at Olmstead studios in New York City.

"Native New Yorker" was also recorded by Esther Phillips in 1978, and Black Box in 1997. The latter version reached #46 in the UK Charts.

The iconic tenor saxophone solo on Odyssey's recording was played by Michael Brecker, with John Tropea on guitar. George Young was part of the horn section, where he played alto sax.

== Chart history ==
| Chart (1977–1978) | Peak position |
|---|---|
| Canada RPM Top Singles | 13 |
| Ireland (IRMA) | 7 |
| New Zealand (RIANZ) | 15 |
| UK Singles (OCC) | 5 |
| U.S. Cashbox Top 100 | 15 |
| U.S. Billboard Hot 100 | 21 |
| U.S. Billboard Hot Dance Club Play | 3 |
| U.S. Billboard Easy Listening | 28 |
| U.S. Billboard Hot Soul Singles | 6 |

== Sampling ==
"Native New Yorker" was later sampled by Rich Cronin's band Loose Cannons, for their song "New York City Girls", as well as by the house music group Kluster, in their song featuring Ron Carroll, entitled "My Love".

== In popular culture ==
The song is featured in the films Eyes of Laura Mars (1978); The Stud (1978); 54 (1998); A Guide to Recognizing Your Saints (2006); The Nanny Diaries (2007), a commercial for The Tonight Show Starring Jimmy Fallon (2014), Colin Quinn: The New York Story (2016), and Spider-Man: No Way Home (2021).

The song opens the 3rd episode of season 3 of Pose (2021) entitled "The Trunk".

"Native New Yorker" is played after every New York City FC soccer game at Yankee Stadium.

Television personality Wendy Williams (as 'Lips') performed a rendition of the song on the fourth season of the American TV series The Masked Singer. Following her performance, multiple memes and reenactments were created.
