= Breakin' Down the Walls of Heartache =

1968 single by the Bandwagon

Single by the Bandwagon

from the album Johnny Johnson and the Bandwagon
- B-side: "Dancin' Master"
- Released: June 7, 1968
- Genre: Soul
- Length: 2:34
- Label: Epic; Direction
- Songwriter(s): Sandy Linzer; Denny Randell
- Producer(s): Sandy Linzer; Denny Randell

The Bandwagon singles chronology
"Baby Make Your Own Sweet Music" (1967)	"Breakin' Down the Walls of Heartache" (1968)	"You" (1968)

"Breakin' Down the Walls of Heartache" is a song written by Sandy Linzer and Denny Randell, and recorded by American soul group the Bandwagon, later known as Johnny Johnson and the Bandwagon. Whilst it was not very successful in the US, it was much more successful in the UK, where it peaked at number 4 on the Singles Chart and was awarded a silver disc for 250,000 sales there.

== Release ==
The Bandwagon's debut single "Baby Make Your Own Sweet Music" had been a hit in several US states, but failed to chart nationally. However, "Breakin' Down the Walls of Heartache" fared marginally better, peaking at number 115 on the Billboard chart and number 100 on the Cash Box chart. It was released in June 1968 with the B-side "Dancin' Master", with both sides written and produced by Sandy Linzer and Denny Randell, and arranged by Charles Calello. It was released in the UK over a month later, but did not enter the Singles Chart until the third week of October, reaching its peak five weeks later and spending a total of fifteen weeks on the chart. "Breakin' Down the Walls of Heartache" has been re-released several times in the UK, notably peaking at number 56 in September 1974.

== Track listing ==
7": Epic / 5-10352

1. "Breakin' Down the Walls of Heartache" – 2:34
2. "Dancin' Master" – 2:47

== Charts ==
Chart (1968)	Peak position
Ireland (IRMA)	5
UK Singles (OCC)	4
US Bubbling Under the Hot 100 (Billboard)	115
US Cash Box Top 100	100
US Top 50 in R&B Locations (Cash Box)	20

Chart (1974)	Peak position
UK Singles (OCC)	56

== Cover versions ==
- In 1980, Dexys Midnight Runners released a cover of the song as a B-side to their UK number one single "Geno".
- In 1981, Bram Tchaikovsky covered the song on his album Funland.
- In 1990, Edwin Starr released a cover of the song as a 12-inch single, included in his album Where Is the Sound.
- In 2019, the song was sung by Jason Pennycooke and Alexia Khadime for the film Rocketman, and was included on the Japanese edition of the soundtrack album.
