= (You've) Never Been in Love Like This Before =

1965 single by Unit Four Plus Two

Single by Unit Four Plus Two
- B-side: "Tell Somebody You Know"
- Released: 7 May 1965
- Recorded: 22 March 1965
- Studio: IBC, London
- Genre: Folk rock; soul pop
- Length: 2:34
- Label: Decca
- Songwriters: Tommy Moeller; Brian Parker
- Producer: John L. Barker

Unit Four Plus Two singles chronology
"Concrete and Clay" (1965)	"(You've) Never Been in Love Like This Before" (1965)	"Hark" (1965)

Audio
- "(You've) Never Been in Love Like This Before" on YouTube

"(You've) Never Been in Love Like This Before" is a song written by vocalist Tommy Moeller and guitarist Brian Parker and recorded by their group Unit Four Plus Two in 1965. The song was composed as a follow-up to the group's third single, "Concrete and Clay", which had reached number one on the Record Retailer singles chart. "(You've) Never Been in Love Like This Before" was written at Moeller's house and incorporates influences from soul music alongside their folk rock sound. The song was recorded at IBC Studios in London with producer John L. Barker.

Decca released "(You've) Never Been in Love Like This Before" as Unit Four Plus Two's fourth single on 7 May 1965, with another original composition, "Tell Somebody You Know" on the B-side. The release reached number 14 in the Record Retailer chart during an 11-week tenure. In North America, the single was a relative chart failure in the US, only peaking at number 95 on the Billboard Hot 100 in July 1965, but became a top-ten single in Canada. The single received critical acclaim upon release, with many critics deeming it superior to "Concrete and Clay". The single was included on the band's US album #1 (Featuring Concrete and Clay).

== Background and composition ==
He [Tommy Moeller] arrives about eight o'clock, has some tea and we get started about eight-thirty. We always work in my room and go on into the early hours of the morning.

— Brian Parker, Beat Instrumental (1965)

On 29 January 1965, British pop group Unit Four Plus Two released their third single "Concrete and Clay", which was written by group vocalist Tommy Moeller along with guitarist Brian Parker. Parker had left the band shortly after writing and recording their second single "Sorrow and Pain" (1964). "Concrete and Clay" entered the Record Retailer chart in March 1965 before reaching number one the charts on 8 April 1965, dislodging the Rolling Stones "The Last Time" (1965) from the top-spot. "Concrete and Clay" established Unit Four plus Two's sound with the wider public, revolving around acoustic guitars, cowbells and rhythms influenced from Latin American music. With the song charting in the US top-30 during the spring of that year, it launched the previously relatively unknown band into worldwide fame. (Note: Before "Concrete and Clay", Unit Four Plus Two's only charting single was their debut "The Green Fields" which peaked at number 48.)

"(You've) Never Been in Love Like This Before" was also penned by Moeller and Parker, and was always intended as a follow-up to that single. The song was written around March 1965 at Moeller's house in between hectic touring resulting from the success of "Concrete and Clay". Band historian John Reed suggests that the song boasts influences from the Brill Building writers, while journalist John Tracy suggests that the song followed a "pop soul" direction while still retaining elements of their folk rock inspired sound. The cowbell gimmick of "Concrete and Clay" was reduced on the newer song. "(You've) Never Been in Love Like This Before" was recorded on 22 March 1965 at IBC Studios at the suggestion of Unit Four Plus Two's manager and producer John L. Barker, as sound engineer Mike Claydon had transferred there from the smaller Recorded Sounds studios. The recording session for the A-side and the B-side, "Tell Somebody You Know". took roughly five hours, with primary focus on the A-side. New Musical Express journalist Keith Altham was used as a session musician for the clapping.

== Release and commercial performance ==
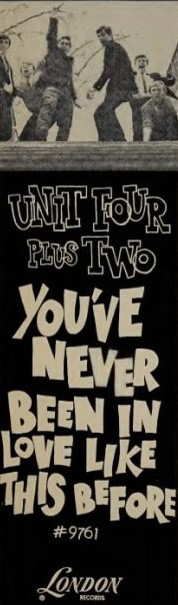
Trade-ad for the single in Cash Box

Decca Records released "(You've) Never Been in Love Like This Before" as Unit Four Plus Two's fourth single on 7 May 1965. (Note: Catalogue number F 12144.) The B-side, "Tell Somebody You Know", another composition written by Moeller and Parker, was a "straightforward rocker" compared to the A-side. The single was part of a promotion campaign of the band by Decca, who simultaneously with the single also issued an EP. The EP was followed shortly after by the band's debut album, 1st Album, in June of that year. The song was issued almost five months after "Concrete and Clay"; Tracy notes the long gap in between singles, during an era where a band was expected to issue singles within two month intervals. As "Concrete and Clay" was still in the charts in the US during May 1965, the band's US label London Records postponed the release until July 1965. (Note: Catalogue number 45-9761.) Unit Four Plus Two appeared on various light entertainment programmes in the UK, including Thank Your Lucky Stars on 22 May 1965, in order to promote the single's release.

In the UK, "(You've) Never Been in Love Like This Before" entered the Record Retailer charts on 19 May 1965 at a position of number 38, before making its way up the charts, peaking at number 14 on 30 June. The song exited the chart on 28 July 1965, having spent 11 weeks in the charts. It fared similarly well in the other UK charts at the time, achieving its highest peak in the Melody Maker charts at number 13. Internationally, the single peaked at number 38 on the retrospective Kent Music Report chart in Australia, but achieved its largest commercial success in Canada, where it reached number six on the RPM Top 100 chart in August 1965. In the US, the single was a relative chart failure, peaking at only number 95 on the Billboard Hot 100, while failing to enter the top 100 in the charts published by Cash Box and Record World. Though a top-20 hit in the UK and Canada, "(You've) Never Been in Love Like This Before" was generally considered a chart failure compared to "Concrete and Clay".

As it was standard to not include new singles on albums in the UK, Decca excluded "(You've) Never Been in Love Like This Before" and its B-side from Unit Four Plus Two's debut album 1st Album in June 1965. In the US, however, London Records replaced the songs "500 Miles" and "Swing Down Chariot" from the album with both sides of the single, releasing the album as #1 (Featuring Concrete and Clay) during that summer. Since its original release, the single has also been featured on most of the band's compilation albums, including Deram Records' Concrete and Clay (1993), Repertoire Records' Singles As & Bs (2003), along with the career-spanning retrospective Concrete & Clay - The Complete Recordings (2016) by Cherry Red Records.

== Critical reception and legacy ==
Upon release in 1965, "(You've) Never Been in Love Like This Before" received primarily good reviews in the press, with many comparing it to "Concrete and Clay". Reviewing for Record Mirror, Peter Jones and Norman Jopling found the single better than "Concrete and Clay". They noted that the single is similar to its predecessor, but stated that it is an entirely different song with "positively marvellous harmonies". The duo also praised the guitar work of Peter Moules, stating that the song features some "delicately inserted guitar touches." Derek Johnson of New Musical Express also drew parallels to "Concrete and Clay", but ultimately deemed "(You've) Never Been in Love Like This Before" a much slower song "that took three spins to sink in". He commended the piano and guitar performances on the song, and praised Moeller's vocal performance, writing that it "builds into a powerful throbbing unison voice crescendo". Johnson's review ends by stating it to be a "very well-made disc". Staff writers for Billboard also considered it stronger than "Concrete and Clay", considering it a "folk-flavored driving rhythm number".

Retrospectively, journalist Chris Welch has written that "(You've) Never Been in Love Like This Before" was a good song that was unable to outperform the massive success of "Concrete and Clay". The single was Unit Four Plus Two's final top-twenty hit in the UK, as the follow-up, "Hark", failed to chart altogether. Their final charting single was "Baby Never Say Goodbye", which reached number 49 on the Record Retailer chart in February 1966. Tracy suggests that the gap between the release of "Concrete and Clay" and "(You've) Never Been in Love Like This Before" was a blow to the band's commercial career which they never recovered from. Bruce Eder from AllMusic has suggested that the band was unable to keep up with contemporary musical trends since their musical style "was the gentle, acoustic guitar driven bossa nova beat embodied by 'Concrete and Clay'", something that "(You've) Never Been in Love Like This Before" broke away from by being more soul-influenced. Eder notes that "whenever they tried to break too far away from it ['Concrete and Clay'], they lost the attributes that made them distinctive in the first place".

== Charts ==
Weekly chart performance for "(You've) Never Been in Love Like This Before"
Chart (1965)	Peak position
Australia (Kent Music Report)	38
Canada Top 100 (RPM)	6
UK (Disc and Music Echo)	13
UK (Melody Maker)	14
UK (New Musical Express)	17
UK (Record Retailer)	14
US Billboard Hot 100	95
US Cash Box Looking Ahead	117
US Record World Upcoming Singles	108
