= Bart vs. Thanksgiving =

- The Simpsons episode
- Episode no.: Season 2 Episode 7
- Directed by: David Silverman
- Written by: George Meyer
- Production code: 7F07
- Original air date: November 22, 1990

Guest appearances
- Greg Berg as Rory; Carol Kane as Maggie Simpson (uncredited)

Episode features
- Chalkboard gag: "I will not do that thing with my tongue"
- Couch gag: The family finds Grampa sleeping on the couch.
- Commentary: Matt Groening; James L. Brooks; George Meyer; Al Jean; Mike Reiss; David Silverman

Episode chronology
← Previous "Dead Putting Society"	Next → "Bart the Daredevil"
- The Simpsons season 2

"Bart vs. Thanksgiving" is the seventh episode of the second season of the American animated television series The Simpsons. It originally aired on Fox in the United States on Thanksgiving, November 22, 1990. In the episode, Bart runs away from home after accidentally destroying a centerpiece that Lisa makes for the Thanksgiving dinner table.

The episode was written by George Meyer and directed by David Silverman. Voice actor Greg Berg guest starred as Rory, one of the homeless people at the soup kitchen. The episode features cultural references to Macy's Thanksgiving Day Parade, and the poets Allen Ginsberg, Jack Kerouac, and Edgar Allan Poe. Since airing, the episode has received mostly positive reviews from critics. It acquired a Nielsen rating of 11.9, and was the third highest-rated show on Fox the week it aired.

== Plot ==
Lisa makes a centerpiece for the Thanksgiving dinner table. Patty and Selma arrive, ignoring Marge's instructions to not bring their own food. Homer picks up Grampa from the retirement home. Marge, Patty, and Selma's mother Jacqueline Bouvier arrives and tells Marge she never does anything right.

Once they are assembled, the Simpsons sit down to eat dinner. When Lisa places the centerpiece on the table, Bart removes it to make way for the turkey. In the ensuing scuffle, Bart accidentally throws the centerpiece into the fireplace and it burns to ashes. Lisa runs to her room sobbing, and Homer and Marge angrily punish Bart by sending him up to his room. Marge then tells him that he has ruined Thanksgiving and later informs him that he will not be allowed to eat dinner until he issues a sincere apology to Lisa in front of the family. Bart refuses and climbs out of his room.

After Homer expels Santa's Little Helper from the house for stealing a turkey drumstick, Bart and the dog run away from home. Bart tries to steal a pie cooling on a window sill at Mr. Burns' mansion, but Mr. Burns' hounds chase him away. While wandering the streets, Bart uses Homer's ID to sell his blood and after passing out, is brought to a breadline serving dinner to homeless people. Kent Brockman interviews Bart for a human interest story. The family sees the television report and call the police, hoping they can help find Bart and bring him home. When the police fail to locate Bart, Homer and Marge regret the things they said to him, feeling that it was what caused him to run off.

Bart later returns home feeling remorseful for leaving after lending money to a couple of beggars. Before opening the door, he imagines himself being greeted warmly and offered an apology, only to be scornfully mocked and laughed at in his face as he grovels an apology, then blamed for everything. Still stubbornly upset, Bart climbs onto the roof to ponder his choices. When he hears Lisa crying because she misses him, Bart invites her to join him on the roof. He finally realizes what he did hurt her deeply and apologizes as Homer and Marge watch proudly. Bart and Lisa later rejoin the family to enjoy a meal of leftovers.

== Production ==
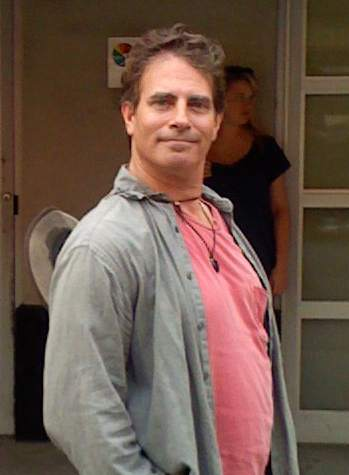
David Silverman directed the episode.

The episode was written by George Meyer and directed by David Silverman. It was the first script Meyer wrote on the show, and he thought he made "quite a few mistakes, but it turned out really well overall." The staff decided to do a Thanksgiving episode after they realized an episode would air on Thursday, November 22, 1990 (Thanksgiving Day). The Simpsons had previously aired at 8:00 p.m. EST on Sunday night but Fox switched its timeslot to the same time on Thursdays at the beginning of the second season. The idea of Bart going up on the roof was suggested by Meyer who used to go up on the roof himself when he had fights with his family.

Voice actor Greg Berg guest starred as Rory, one of the homeless people at the soup kitchen. Marge's mother, Jackie Bouvier, voiced by Julie Kavner, makes her first physical appearance on The Simpsons in the episode, though she was first referenced in a flashback in the season one episode "Moaning Lisa". Bill and Marty, voiced by Dan Castellaneta and Harry Shearer respectively, also make their first visual appearances, although they were heard on the radio in previous episodes, including "Bart Gets an 'F'". They are two radio show hosts and DJs on Springfield's own radio station KBBL. Homer listens to their radio show when he drives to pick up Grampa at the retirement home for the Thanksgiving dinner.

In Bart's fantasy, Maggie says "It's your fault I can't talk!" Carol Kane voiced this line, although she was uncredited. However, the line was credited to be voiced by Nancy Cartwright.

== Cultural references ==
At the beginning of the episode, Homer and Bart watch Macy's Thanksgiving Day Parade, an annual United States parade that includes floating helium balloons modeled after famous fictional characters. When Homer and Bart talk about the balloons modeled after Bullwinkle and Underdog, The Simpsons is self-referenced as Homer tells Bart that if the parade "turned every flash-in-pan cartoon character into a balloon, it would be a farce", after which a giant balloon of Bart can be seen on the television in the background. Not coincidentally, 1990 was the year Bart was turned into a balloon for the Macy's Thanksgiving Day Parade. While watching the Thanksgiving football game, Homer says he is cheering for the Dallas Cowboys. Two of the fictional Dallas Cowboys players are named Jay Kogen and Wallace Wolodarsky after two writers on The Simpsons.

The song that plays on the radio during the break in the Thanksgiving football game is "Get Dancin'" by Disco-Tex and the Sex-O-Lettes. The game is played at the Pontiac Silverdome, then home to the Detroit Lions, who also play on Thanksgiving. Lisa says the following about her centerpiece: "It's a tribute to the trailblazing women who made our country great. See, there's Georgia O'Keeffe, Susan B. Anthony, and this is Marjory Stoneman Douglas. I'm sure you haven't heard of her, but she worked her whole life to preserve the Florida Everglades." The poem Lisa is seen writing in her room after her centerpiece is destroyed is a reference to Allen Ginsberg's poem "Howl". Lisa also keeps a book of Ginsberg's work on a bookshelf next to Jack Kerouac's novel On the Road, and a collection of poems by Edgar Allan Poe. Feeling hungry, Bart decides to steal food from the old, rich Mr. Burns, who lives on the corner of Croesus and Mammon, both connoting wealth. A member of Burns' security staff reads the novel Les Misérables.

== Reception ==
In its original broadcast, "Bart vs. Thanksgiving" finished thirty-seventh in the ratings for the week of November 19–25, 1990, with a Nielsen rating of 11.9, equivalent to approximately eleven million viewing households. It was the third highest-rated show on Fox that week, following Married... with Children and In Living Color.

Since airing, the episode has received mostly positive reviews from television critics. The authors of the book I Can't Believe It's a Bigger and Better Updated Unofficial Simpsons Guide, Gary Russell and Gareth Roberts, wrote: "Marge's mother Jackie is particularly nightmarish in her first real appearance. The final sequence on the rooftop with Lisa and Bart is lovely, and Homer's comment to Marge is a magical wrap-up to a good episode." DVD Movie Guide's Colin Jacobson said the episode "maintained a nicely irreverent tone most of the time – irreverent enough to make it amusing, at least," and added: "The interaction of the Simpson and Bouvier families at dinner was terrific, and Bart's experiences on skid row made their point while they still managed to be pointed and clever. 'Bart vs. Thanksgiving' was another winner."

Bryce Wilson of Cinema Blend said "Bart vs. Thanksgiving" and "Lisa's Substitute", another season two episode, were the first episodes that "asked [the audience] to truly care about the characters, and they work beautifully". Both Dawn Taylor of The DVD Journal and Jacobson thought the most memorable line of the episode was Jackie's line to Marge: "I have laryngitis and it hurts to talk, so I'll just say one thing – you never do anything right."
