= The Toys =

American pop girl group of the 1960s

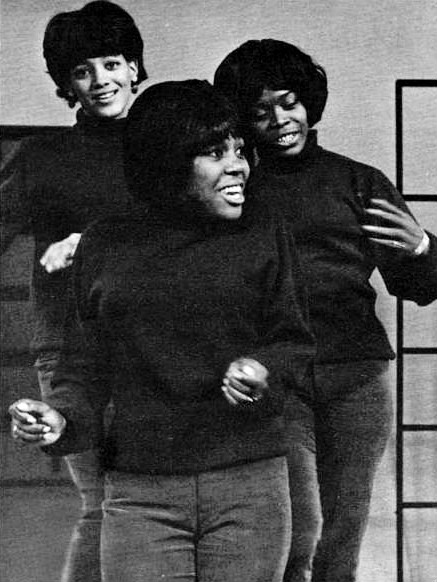
- The group in 1965: June Montiero (left), Barbara Harris (center), and Barbara Parritt (right)

Background information
- Origin: New York City, U.S.
- Genres: R&B, pop
- Years active: 1961–1968
- Labels: DynoVoice, Musicor
- Past members: Barbara Harris; Barbara Parritt; June Montiero

The Toys were an American pop girl group from Jamaica, New York, which was formed in 1961 and disbanded in 1968. Their most successful recording was "A Lover's Concerto" (1965), which sold more than two million copies and reached No. 2 on the Billboard Hot 100 chart.

== History ==
Barbara Harris started singing in her hometown churches at an early age and moved to Queens, New York City, when she was 11 years old. In high school, she joined a band with four other young singers: Barbara Parritt (later Toomer), June Montiero, Betty Stokes and Betty Blocker. Stokes and Blocker eventually left the group, so Harris, Parritt and Montiero formed a trio.

Their friend Bobby Uri, a manager, named the band The Charlettes, making them work doing background vocals for several recording artists. At a talent show in Brooklyn, they met Eddy Chase, who in turn introduced them to manager Vince Marc and songwriter/recording executive Bob Crewe.

The group was then named The Toys and landed their first recording contract on Crewe's DynoVoice Records. Marc introduced them also to songwriters Sandy Linzer and Denny Randell.

The couple wrote most of the songs the trio recorded. They took a piano piece from a Bach exercise book ("Minuet in G major" by Christian Petzold), put a Motown bassline to it, and "A Lover's Concerto" was born: it was released in 1965 and soon rose to No. 2 on the U.S. Billboard Hot 100. The band followed that up with another hit, "Attack!", also written by Linzer and Randell: released in 1966, it reached the Top 20.

The songwriters also produced the group's 1965–66 recordings on the DynoVoice record label. Global sales of this disc exceeded two million copies, with a gold record awarded by the RIAA in 1965.

The first U.S. tour of the trio was with Gene Pitney. In 1967, they changed labels and producers, moving to the Pitney's ones, Musicor Records, but charted only one more minor single (a cover of Brian Hyland's "Sealed with a Kiss") before breaking up.

The band appeared on most of the major TV rock programs, including Hullabaloo and Shindig!. They had a cameo role performing their song "Attack!" in the 1967 beach movie It's a Bikini World.

Barbara Harris continued to perform on public television and at "Oldie Shows" as The Toys featuring Barbara Harris. She has also sung with Joe Rivers, known for Johnnie & Joe's hit, "Over the Mountain, Across the Sea".

In 1998, she produced and released her first solo CD, entitled Barbara Now, for which she wrote all but two of the songs. In 2016, she released the singles "Forever Spring" and "(Rock 'n' Roll) Soothes The Soul".

== Members ==
The trio consisted of:

- Barbara Harris (born "Barbara Ann Harris", August 18, 1945, Elizabeth City, North Carolina),
- Barbara Parritt (born October 1, 1944, Wilmington, North Carolina)
- June Montiero (born July 1, 1946, Queens, New York)

== Discography ==
=== Singles ===
(U.S. chart positions are Billboard Hot 100 except as noted)

(-) Denotes releases that did not chart in the specific region.

Singles
Date	A-Side	B-Side	US	UK
1965	A Lover's Concerto	This Night	2 (1 On Cashbox)	5
1965	Attack	See How They Run	18	36
1966	May My Heart Be Cast Into Stone	On Backstreet	85	-
1966	Silver Spoon	Can't Get Enough Of You Baby	111	-
1966	Baby Toys	Happy Birthday Broken Heart	76	-
1966	You Got It Baby	You've Got To Give Her Love	-	-
1967	Ciao Baby	I Got Carried Away	-	-
1967	My Love Sonata	I Close My Eyes	-	-
1968	Sealed With A Kiss	I Got My Heart Set On You	112	-

Albums
Date	Album Title	US	R&B
1966	The Toys Sing "A Lover's Concerto" and "Attack!"	92	9
