= Summertime Guy =

"Summertime Guy" is a song recorded by Eddie Rambeau, issued by Swan Records, and written and composed by game show pioneer Chuck Barris. Originally, Rambeau was to debut the song on American Bandstand in 1962, but mere minutes before Rambeau was to perform, he was told the song could not be sung, due to Barris then being an ABC employee, owing to concerns of payola, which had become a major music industry scandal at the time. That was also the reason for the record not receiving airplay on any ABC-owned radio station, weighing the song down so it was not a hit.

Later, Barris contacted composer Milton DeLugg to arrange an instrumental version of the song, which eventually wound up on the game show The Newlywed Game and would become its signature theme song (the main melody of the theme is preceded by Felix Mendelssohn's Wedding March).
