= Minuets in G major and G minor =

Composition by Christian Petzold, formerly attributed to Bach

Petzold's Minuets in the 1725 Notebook for A. M. Bach
Minuet in G major, BWV Anh. 114 (1:38)

Minuet in G minor, BWV Anh. 115 (1:57)
Performed on digital piano

The Minuets in G major and G minor, BWV Anh. 114 and 115, are a pair of movements from a suite for harpsichord by Christian Petzold in 1720, which, through their appearance in the 1725 Notebook for Anna Magdalena Bach, used to be attributed to Johann Sebastian Bach. These minuets, which are suitable for beginners on the piano, are among the best known pieces of music literature. The 1965 pop song "A Lover's Concerto", of which millions of copies were sold, is based on the first of these Minuets.

== History ==
In the late 17th century, Christian Petzold became organist at the Sophienkirche (lit. 'Sophia's Church') of Dresden. By the time Johann Sebastian Bach started to visit Dresden, Petzold was well acquainted with several of the city's musicians, including the violinist Johann Georg Pisendel, with whom Bach was also acquainted. In 1720, Petzold composed the music for the inauguration of the new Silbermann organ of the Sophienkirche. Bach gave a concert on that organ when he visited Dresden in September 1725. Petzold died in 1733: as organist of the Sophienkirche he was succeeded by Bach's son Wilhelm Friedemann.

=== In the Notebook for Anna Magdalena Bach ===
The second Notebook for Anna Magdalena Bach was started in 1725. It opened with two harpsichord suites, that is, the Partitas BWV 827 and 830, composed and written down by Johann Sebastian Bach. Anna Magdalena Bach likely received the notebook from her husband in the autumn of 1725, as a present for either her birthday (22 September) or their wedding anniversary (3 December). Nos. 3 to 11 in the notebook are keyboard pieces written down by Anna Magdalena, likely shortly after she was given the volume. No. 3, the first piece after the two seven-movement Partitas, is a Minuet in F major by an unknown composer (likely not Bach), adopted as No. 113 in the second annex (German: Anhang, Anh.), that is the annex of doubtful compositions, in the Bach-Werke-Verzeichnis (BWV). Petzold's Minuets in G major and G minor, BWV Anh. 114 and 115, are the next two entries in the notebook (Nos. 4 and 5). These pieces may have been brought back from Dresden by Johann Sebastian when he visited this city in September 1725.

Bach likely intended the simple binary dances contained in Anna Magdalena's notebooks, including the Minuets entered without composer indication, as teaching material, likely rather for his younger children than for his wife.

=== Petzold's harpsichord music ===
From the early 1720s Petzold owned a state-of-the-art harpsichord manufactured by Silbermann. In Johann Gottfried Walther's Lexicon, published in 1732, Petzold is mentioned as a composer of "good keyboard pieces" (German: gute ... Clavier-Stücke). Some of Petzold's harpsichord music appeared in 1729 collections:

- Georg Philipp Telemann included a harpsichord suite by Petzold in the last five issues of Der getreue Music-Meister.
- A collection of 25 concertos for unaccompanied harpsichord by Petzold was copied as Recueil des XXV Concerts Pour le Clavecin.

Heinrich Raphael Krause was a student in Leipzig from 1720, before becoming cantor in Olbernhau in 1725. Johann Benjamin Tzschirich was a student in Grimma when he started to copy harpsichord pieces collected by Krause in an album in 1726. Tzschirich came to study in Leipzig in 1729, and became a lawyer in Bitterfeld in 1736. Meanwhile, he had continued to add pieces to his harpsichord music manuscript, including compositions by Bach (part of BWV 914), Friedrich Wilhelm Zachow, Telemann, Johann Kuhnau and others. One of the last pieces he entered, likely around the time when moving to Bitterfeld (1735–1736), was a Suite by Petzold containing, together with eight other movements, the G major/G minor combined Minuet, otherwise only known as Nos. 4 and 5 of Anna Magdalena Bach's second notebook. Tzschirich may have had access to a score of Petzold's Suite via the Bachs.

== Description ==
In Tzschirich's manuscript, the Minuet pair in G major and G minor is preceded by five other movements of Petzold's Suite, respectively a Prelude, an Allemande, a Courante, a Sarabande and a Bourrée. After the double Minuet, Petzold's Suite continues with a Gigue and a Passepied with Trio. According to the manuscript, the Minuets are to be performed da capo, in this order:

- Menuet alternativement (=first Minuet, G major)
- Menuet 2 (=second Minuet, G minor)
- On reprend le premier Menuet (repeat the first Minuet)

Both the G major and the G minor Menuets, in 3/4 time, consist of 32 measures, each with a repeat sign at the end of the 16th measure (for a repeat of the first half of the piece), and another at the end of the Menuet (for a repeat of the second half). There are a few minor differences between these Minuets as they appear in Tzschirich's manuscript and how they are written down in Anna Magdalena's second notebook.

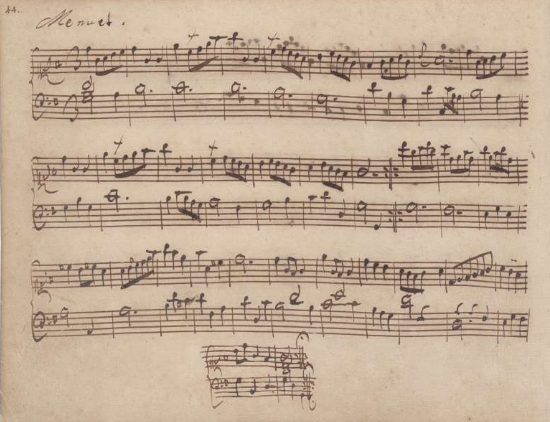
The Minuet in G major, BWV Anh. 114, as found in the second notebook of Anna Magdalena Bach (No. 4, p. 44)

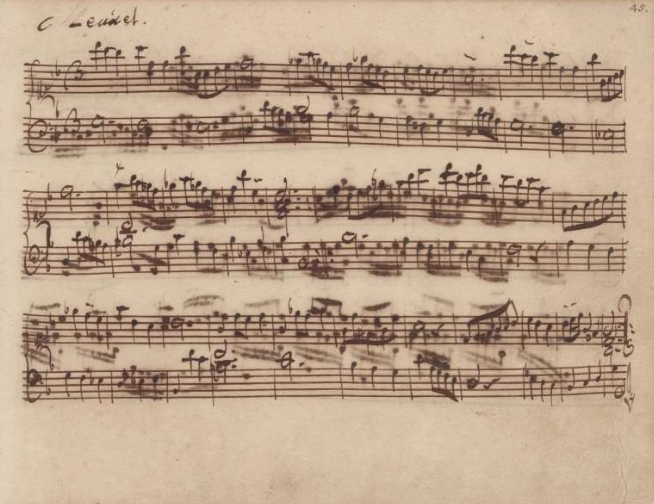
The Minuet in G minor, BWV Anh. 115, as found in the second notebook of Anna Magdalena Bach (No. 5, p. 45)

The first eight measures in modern notation:

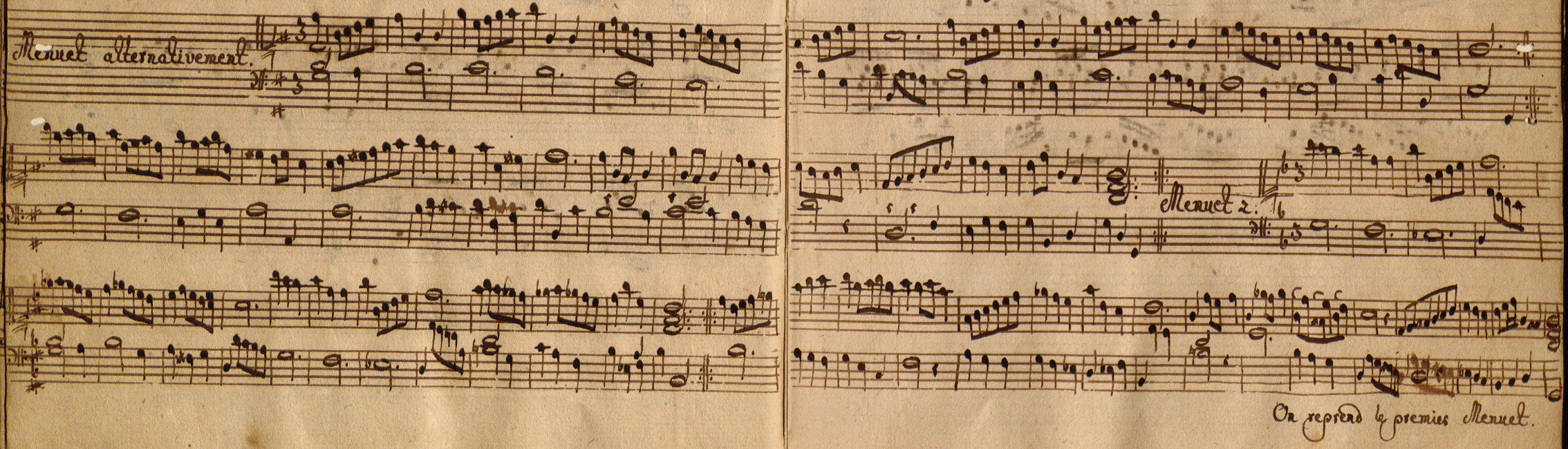
The minuets as found in Tzschirich's manuscript (pp. 34v-35r)

== Reception ==
In 1880, C. F. Peters published Nos. 4 and 5 of Anna Magdalena Bach's second notebook as two of "twenty easy piano pieces" (German: 20 leichte Clavierstücke) from that manuscript. The Bach-Gesellschaft published the Minuets in 1894. After the publication of several anthologies, all the pieces of the second notebook were published in a single volume in 1904.

In 1904, Max Seiffert published a description of Tzschirich's harpsichord music manuscript, however, without substantial analysis of its content: the correspondence of Petzold's double Minuet contained in it with the G major/G minor Minuets of Anna Magdalena Bach's notebook remained unnoticed. In the first edition of the Bach-Werke-Verzeichnis, published in 1950, the two Minuets were included as doubtful compositions in Anh. II, along with nearly 20 other anonymous keyboard compositions of Anna Magdalena Bach's second notebook (BWV Anh. II 113–132). In 1957, Anna Magdalena's notebooks were published in Vol. V/4 of the New Bach Edition. Without having access to other primary sources for the G major and G minor Minuets than Anna Magdalena Bach's notebook, Georg von Dadelsen, the editor of the New Bach Edition volume, remarked that the Minuets BWV Anh. 114 and 115 appeared to belong together.

Outside the context of scholarly literature, and despite being marked as doubtful in the BWV, the Minuets were still generally considered as compositions by Bach. The melody from the 1965 pop song "A Lover's Concerto", written by American songwriters Sandy Linzer and Denny Randell, was based on the Minuet in G major. The song was recorded by The Toys and reached number 2 in the US Billboard Hot 100 and number 5 in the UK Singles Chart. "A Lover's Concerto" sold more than two million copies and was awarded gold record certification by the R.I.A.A.

Hans-Joachim Schulze published an article, dedicated to Georg von Dadelsen, in the Bach-Jahrbuch of 1979 (issued 1980), in which he described Petzold's Suite de Clavecin (harpsichord suite) contained in Tzschirich's manuscript, and its Minuet pair corresponding to BWV Anh. 114/115. Consequently, from the next edition of the Bach-Werke-Verzeichnis (1990), the Minuets were attributed to Petzold and moved from Anh. II to Anh. III, that is the Anhang of spurious works, their full BWV numbers thus becoming BWV Anh. II 114 / Anh. III 183→ and BWV Anh. II 115 / Anh. III 183→.

In the 1984 film Electric Dreams, the piece is the basis for a duet, or a friendly musical duel, between cellist Madeline and Edgar, the computer. This song from the movie soundtrack, titled "The Duel," was composed and performed by Giorgio Moroder.

Notwithstanding their status as pieces for beginners, the Minuets BWV Anh. 114 and 115 were recorded by renowned performers (on harpsichord unless otherwise indicated), including:

- Gustav Leonhardt recorded "2 Minuets ... BWV Anh. 114 & Anh. 115: Also attributed to Christian Pezold (...)" in September 1988 (issued 1989).
- E. Power Biggs, performing the minuets on organ, included in The Biggs Bach Book (issued 1990).
- Igor Kipnis, included the Minuets in The Notebook of Anna Magdalena Bach (issued 1992).
- Richard Egarr recorded "2 Minuets, BWV Anh. 114–5 (from Clavier-Büchlein für Anna Magdalena Bach [1725])" in 1995 (issued 1997).
- Mahan Esfahani, performing the minuets on clavichord, recorded "Minuets in G major & G minor BWVAnh 114 & 115" in 2021

In 1988, Dadelsen published a facsimile of Anna Magdalena's second notebook. Richard Jones published the short pieces, edited with piano fingering, of Anna Magdalena's 1725 notebook in 1997. In 21st-century publications, the Minuets BWV Anh. 114 and 115 are usually correctly identified as Petzold's. In the 2010s, digital facsimiles of the Minuets as written down by Anna Magdalena Bach became available at Bach Digital and at the website of the Berlin State Library.

== Sources ==
- "2. Notenbüchlein der A. M. Bach, 1725 (D-B Mus. ms. Bach P 225)". Bach Digital. Leipzig: Bach Archive; et al. 2020-01-13.
- "D-Bim Mus. ms. 29". Bach Digital. Leipzig: Bach Archive; et al. 2020-01-17.
- "Minuet, G ("2. Notenbuch der A. M. Bach, 1725") BWV Anh. 114". Bach Digital. Leipzig: Bach Archive; et al. 2018-07-07.
- "Minuet, g ("2. Notenbuch der A. M. Bach, 1725") BWV Anh. 115". Bach Digital. Leipzig: Bach Archive; et al. 2018-07-07.
- Batka, Richard [in German], ed. (1904). Johann Sebastian Bachs Notenbüchlein für Anna Magdalena Bach (1725) [Johann Sebastian Bach's note-booklet for Anna Magdalena Bach (1725)] (in German). Munich: Callwey.
- Czerny, Carl; Griepenkerl, Friedrich Konrad [in German]; Roitzsch, Friedrich August, eds. (1880). "20 leichte Clavierstücke nebst einem Liede (Aus dem Clavierbuche der Anna Magdalena Bach)" [Twenty easy keyboard pieces, and a song (from the keyboard-booklets of Anna Magdalena Bach)]. Compositions pour Piano seul de J. Seb. Bach: Supplement [Compositions for solo piano by J. Seb. Bach]. Oeuvres complettes (Edition nouvelle) (in French and German). Vol. 23. C. F. Peters.
- Dadelsen, Georg von, ed. (1957). Die Klavierbüchlein für Anna Magdalena Bach von 1722 und 1725 [The keyboard-booklets for Anna Magdalena Bach from 1722 and 1725]. New Bach Edition (in German). Vol. V/4 (Score). Bärenreiter. ISMN 9790006461462. BA 5008-01.
- Dürr, Alfred; Kobayashi, Yoshitake; Beißwenger, Kirsten, eds. (1998). Bach Werke Verzeichnis: Kleine Ausgabe – Nach der von Wolfgang Schmieder vorgelegten 2. Ausgabe [Bach Works Catalogue: Small Edition – After Wolfgang Schmieder's 2nd edition] (in German) (BWV^{2a} ed.). Wiesbaden: Breitkopf & Härtel. ISBN 9783765102493. Preface in English and German.
- Murrells, Joseph (1978). The Book of Golden Discs (2nd ed.). London: Barrie & Jenkins. ISBN 0-214-20512-6.
- Petzold, Christian; Kremmler, Johann George (1729). Recueil des XXV Concerts Pour le Clavecin [Album of 25 harpsichord concertos] (in French). SLUB Dresden.
- Schmieder, Wolfgang, ed. (1990). Thematisch-systematisches Verzeichnis der musikalischen Werke von Johann Sebastian Bach: Bach-Werke-Verzeichnis – 2. überarbeitete und erweiterte Ausgabe [Thematic-Systematic Catalogue of the Musical Works of Johann Sebastian Bach: Bach-Works-Catalogue – 2nd reworked and enlarged edition] (in German) (BWV^{2} ed.). Wiesbaden: Breitkopf & Härtel. ISBN 9783765102554.
- Schulenberg, David [in French] (2006). "Appendix B: The Clavier-Büchlein vor Anna Magdalena Bach". The Keyboard Music of J.S. Bach (2nd ed.). Routledge. pp. 447–450. ISBN 9780415974004.
- Schulze, Hans-Joachim (1980). "Ein 'Dresdner Menuett' im zweiten Klavierbüchlein der Anna Magdalena Bach: Nebst Hinweisen zur Überlieferung einiger Kammermusikwerke Bachs" [A Minuet from Dresden in the second keyboard booklet of Anna Magdalena Bach: Further, indications regarding the transmission of some of Bach's chamber music compositions]. In Schulze, Hans-Joachim; Wolff, Christoph (eds.). Bach-Jahrbuch 1979 [Bach Yearbook 1979]. Bach-Jahrbuch (in German). Vol. 65. Berlin: Evangelische Verlagsanstalt. pp. 45–64. doi:10.13141/bjb.v1979.
- Stinson, Russell (1992). "Preface". Keyboard transcriptions from the Bach circle. Recent researches in the music of the Baroque Era. Vol. 69. Madison: A-R Editions. pp. VII–XVIII. ISBN 0895792699. ISSN 0484-0828.
- Telemann, Georg Philipp, ed. (1728–1729). Der getreue Music-Meister [The faithful music-master] (in German). Hamburg. SLUB Dresden.
- Waldersee, Paul [in German], ed. (1894). Musikstücke in den Notenbüchern der Anna Magdalena Bach [Musical pieces in the notebooks of Anna Magdalena Bach]. Bach-Gesellschaft Ausgabe (in German). Vol. 43. Leipzig: Breitkopf & Härtel.
- Walther, Johann Gottfried (1732). "Pezold (Christian)". Musicalisches Lexicon oder Musicalische Bibliothec (in German). Leipzig: W. Deer. p. 475.
- Williams, Peter (2007). "The family". J. S. Bach: A Life in Music. Cambridge University Press. pp. 158–160. ISBN 9781139461191.
- Williams, Peter (2016). "The Anna Magdalena books and the French Suites". Bach: A Musical Biography. Cambridge University Press. pp. 231–234. ISBN 9781107139251.
- Wolff, Christoph; Emery, Walter (2001). "Bach, Johann Sebastian". Grove Music Online. doi:10.1093/gmo/9781561592630.article.6002278195. ISBN 9781561592630.
- Yearsley, David (2019). Sex, Death, and Minuets: Anna Magdalena Bach and Her Musical Notebooks. University of Chicago Press. ISBN 9780226617848.
