= A Lover's Concerto =

Pop song

Single by The Toys

from the album The Toys Sing "A Lover's Concerto" and "Attack!"
- B-side: "This Night"
- Released: August 1965 (US); October 1965 (UK)
- Genre: Pop
- Length: 2:36
- Label: DynoVoice
- Songwriters: Sandy Linzer, Denny Randell, Christian Petzold
- Producers: Linzer and Randell

The Toys singles chronology
"A Lover's Concerto" (1965)	"Attack!" (1966)

"A Lover's Concerto" is a pop song written by American songwriters Sandy Linzer and Denny Randell, based on the 18th century composition by Christian Petzold, "Minuet in G major" (formerly attributed to J.S. Bach), and recorded in 1965 by the Toys. "A Lover's Concerto" sold more than two million copies and was awarded gold record certification by the RIAA.

Their original version of the song was a major hit in the United States and United Kingdom (among other countries) during 1965. It peaked on the US Billboard Hot 100 chart at number 2. "A Lover's Concerto" reached number 1 both on the US Cashbox chart (Billboard's main competitor), and in Canada on the RPM national singles chart. It peaked at number 5 in the UK Singles Chart.

== History ==
Linzer and Randell used the melody of the familiar "Minuet in G major" (BWV Anh. 114), which first appeared in J.S. Bach's Notebook for Anna Magdalena Bach. The only difference is that the "Minuet in G major" is written in 3/4 time, whereas "A Lover's Concerto" is arranged in 4/4 time. Although often attributed to Bach himself, the "Minuet in G major" is now generally accepted as having been written by Christian Petzold.

The melody had been popularized by bandleader Freddy Martin in the 1940s, in a recording that was released under the title "A Lover's Concerto".

Critic Dave Thompson wrote of the Toys' version: "Few records are this perfect. Riding across one of the most deceptively hook-laden melodies ever conceived ... 'A Lover's Concerto' marks the apogee of the Girl Group sound." The song also has an unusual structure that blurs the differences between its verses and choruses. The lyrics begin:

How gentle is the rain
That falls softly on the meadow,
Birds high up in the trees
Serenade the clouds with their melodies

Sarah Vaughan recorded the song for a like-named EP released in Australia in 1965, and the song was also included on her 1966 album Pop Artistry of Sarah Vaughan released in the United States by Mercury Records. Neil Sedaka recorded a version in Italian (with unrelated lyrics), entitled "Lettera Bruciata" ("Burnt Letter"), released as a single in 1966.

== Charts ==
=== Weekly charts ===
Chart (1965–1966)	Peak position
Canada RPM Top Singles	1
New Zealand (Listener)	2
UK Singles Chart	5
US Billboard Hot 100	2
US R&B Singles (Billboard)	4
US Cash Box Top 100	1

=== Year-end charts ===
Chart (1965)	Rank
US Cash Box Top 100	96
