= Get Dancin' =

Single by Disco-Tex and the Sex-O-Lettes

from the album Disco Tex & His Sex-O-Lettes Review
- B-side: "Get Dancin', Part II"
- Released: November 1974
- Genre: Disco
- Length: 3:56
- Label: Chelsea
- Songwriters: Bob Crewe, Kenny Nolan
- Producer: Bob Crewe

Disco-Tex and the Sex-O-Lettes singles chronology
"Get Dancin'" (1974)	"I Wanna Dance Wit' Choo (Doo Dat Dance)" (1975)

Official audio
- "Get Dancin'" on YouTube

"Get Dancin'" is a song written by Bob Crewe and Kenny Nolan and performed by Disco-Tex and the Sex-O-Lettes, led by Monti Rock III. The song was produced by Bob Crewe and arranged by Bruce Miller. The song was featured on their 1975 album, Disco Tex & His Sex-O-Lettes Review.

It reached No. 1 on the US Disco chart, No. 3 on the US Dance chart, No. 8 on the UK Singles Chart, No. 8 in Canada, No. 10 on the Billboard Hot 100, No. 19 in Australia, and No. 32 on the US R&B chart in 1974. The single ranked No. 100 on Billboard's Year-End Hot 100 singles of 1975.

Monti Rock III, calling himself Disco Tex, tells the audience that despite the troubles in the world, they should dance and enjoy themselves. As the song ends, he thanks the audience for their applause. It appears they want him to do an encore of the song. At first, he protests. "I am tired, I can't, I'm exhausted" he tells the audience, adding that his wig is wet from perspiration. But they continue to chant and he begins the song again.

The single (which is essentially Part 1) lasts 3.20 and fades after the words "My chiffon is wet, darling". The lyrics mention, in passing, four additional songs ("Rock the Boat" by the Hues Corporation, "Machine Gun" by the Commodores, "The Loco-Motion" by Grand Funk Railroad, and "Radar Love" by Golden Earring), as well as gossip columnist Rona Barrett. The complete version (Parts 1 and 2) lasts 7.15.

== Chart history ==
=== Weekly charts ===
Chart (1974–1975)	Peak position
Australia (Kent Music Report)	19
Canada RPM Top Singles	8
France (IFOP)	20
Ireland (IRMA)	16
UK (OCC)	8
US Billboard Hot 100	10
US Billboard Disco	1
US Billboard Dance	3
US Billboard R&B	32
US Cash Box Top 100	10

=== Year-end charts ===
Chart (1975)	Rank
Canada	82
US Billboard Hot 100	100

== In popular culture ==
The song is featured on two episodes of The Simpsons, season 2's “Bart vs. Thanksgiving” where Homer listens to a Super Bowl halftime show on the radio where the song is covered by Hooray for Everything (a parody of Up with People) and season 12's "I'm Going to Praiseland", where it plays in Disco Stu's fantasy Heaven.

== Other versions ==
- Van McCoy and The Soul City Symphony released a version of the song in 1975 as the B-side to the UK release of "The Hustle". It was featured on their 1975 album, Disco Baby.
- Sandy Nelson released a version of the song as the B-side to the 1975 Australian single "Blue Eyed Soul".
