= I Wanna Dance Wit' Choo (Doo Dat Dance) =

1975 song by Disco-Tex and the Sex-O-Lettes

Single by Disco-Tex and the Sex-O-Lettes

from the album Disco Tex & His Sex-O-Lettes Review
- B-side: "I Wanna Dance Wit' Choo (Doo Dat Dance), Part II"
- Released: April 1975
- Genre: Disco
- Length: 3:43
- Label: Chelsea
- Songwriters: Bob Crewe, Denny Randell
- Producer: Bob Crewe

Disco-Tex and the Sex-O-Lettes singles chronology
"Get Dancin'" (1974)	"I Wanna Dance Wit' Choo (Doo Dat Dance)" (1975)	"Jam Band" (1975)

"I Wanna Dance Wit' Choo (Doo Dat Dance)" is a song written by Bob Crewe and Denny Randell and performed by Disco-Tex and the Sex-O-Lettes. The song was featured on their 1975 album, Disco Tex & His Sex-O-Lettes Review. The song was produced by Bob Crewe and arranged by Denny Randell.

== Chart history ==
In 1975, it reached No. 3 on the US Disco chart, No. 6 on the UK Singles Chart, No. 7 on the US Dance chart, No. 23 on the Billboard Hot 100, No. 24 in Canada, No. 33 on the US R&B chart, and No. 100 in Australia.

The song was ranked #176 on the Canadian Top 200 of 1975 chart.
