= Diane Renay =

American singer (born 1945)

- Born: Renee Diane Kushner; July 13, 1945 (age 81); South Philadelphia, Pennsylvania, United States
- Occupation: Singer
- Years active: 1962–present
- Labels: Atco; 20th Century Fox; MGM; New Voice; United Artists; D-Man; Fontana

Diane Renay (born Renee Diane Kushner; July 13, 1945) is an American pop singer, best known for her 1964 hit song, "Navy Blue".

== Early life ==
Renay was born to a Jewish family in South Philadelphia, Pennsylvania. She started singing at an early age and took voice lessons from Artie Singer, a voice teacher who also managed Danny and the Juniors (of "At the Hop" fame). Singer encouraged Renay to pursue a recording career. Renay attended Northeast High School (Philadelphia, Pennsylvania).

== Career ==
Record producer/songwriter Pete DeAngelis was a frequent customer at the Kushners' family jewelry store, and Renay's parents arranged for her to audition for him. DeAngelis, impressed with her talents, got Renay signed to the Atco Records label. Under the new stage name Diane Renay, she released her first single, "Little White Lies", in 1962, but it failed to chart nationally, as did the follow-up, "A Dime a Dozen", and Atco dropped her from the label.

However, Bob Crewe, who had written and produced material for Renay's second recording session, then signed her to a new recording contract whereby he would write and produce records for her. Under Crewe's guidance and signed to the 20th Century label, Renay, then 17 years old, released her biggest hit, "Navy Blue", in late 1963. The song told the story of a girl, lonely for her steady boyfriend away from home in the U.S. Navy and anxious to see him again. "Navy Blue", composed by Crewe with Bud Rehak and Eddie Rambeau, became a national smash, reaching No. 6 on the Hot 100 on 14–21 March 1964, and soaring to No. 1 on the Adult Contemporary singles chart. The song was followed by Renay's debut album, also titled Navy Blue.

Renay's only other single release to crack the national Billboard chart was "Kiss Me Sailor", reaching number 29 later in 1964. Subsequent singles, including "Growin' Up Too Fast", "Watch Out Sally", "It's In Your Hands", and "Happy Birthday Broken Heart", were hits in certain local markets such as Salt Lake City, Las Vegas and Miami, but failed to break nationally. Renay moved to the Fontana label in 1969 and attempted a comeback with covers of "Yesterday" and "Hold Me, Thrill Me, Kiss Me", but these also failed to chart. She did not record again until the early 1980s.

Renay remains active as a performer today and in 2001 released Diane Renay Sings Some Things Old and Some Things New, a double-CD compilation album of her work (including many previously unreleased tracks) from the 1960s through the 1990s.

== Discography ==
=== Albums ===
Year	Title	Album details	Peak chart positions	
Year	Title	Album details	US Billboard	US Cashbox
1964	Navy Blue	Released: April 1964; Label: 20th Century Fox (TFS 4133/TFM 3133)	54	55

=== Singles ===
Year	Title	Label	Catalogue number	Peak chart positions				Album
Year	Title	Label	Catalogue number	US Billboard	US Cashbox	US AC	Canada CHUM R.P.M	Album
1962	"Little White Lies" b/w "Falling Star"	Atco	45-6240	—	—	—	—	Non-album singles
1963	"A Dime a Dozen" b/w 'Tender"	Atco	45-6262	—	—	—	—	Non-album singles
1963	"Navy Blue" b/w "Unbelievable Guy"	20th Century Fox	456	6	6	1	7	Navy Blue
1964	"Kiss Me Sailor" b/w "Soft Spoken Guy"	20th Century Fox	477	29	28	—	13	Navy Blue
1964	"Growin' Up Too Fast" b/w "Waitin' for Joey"	20th Century Fox	514	124	—	—	23	Non-album singles
1964	"It's In Your Hands" b/w "A Present from Eddie" (from Navy Blue)	20th Century Fox	533	131	—	—	—	Non-album singles
1964	"Watch Out, Sally!" b/w "Billy Blue Eyes"	MGM	K13296	101	95	—	—	Non-album singles
1965	"I Had a Dream" b/w "Troublemaker"	MGM	K13335	—	—	—	—	Non-album singles
1965	"The Company You Keep" b/w "Words"	New Voice	800	—	—	—	—	Non-album singles
1965	"Happy Birthday, Broken Heart" b/w "Cross My Heart, Hope to Die"	New Voice	803	—	—	—	—	Non-album singles
1966	"Soldier Boy" b/w "Words" (Non-album track)	New Voice	813	—	—	—	—	Navy Blue
1966	"Navy Blue" (reissue) b/w "Unbelievable Guy"	20th Century Fox	45-6456	—	—	—	—	Navy Blue
1966	"Please Gypsy" b/w "Dynamite"	United Artists	UA 50048	—	—	—	—	Non-album singles
1968	"Can't Help Loving That Man" b/w "It's Good Day For A Parade"	D-Man	D-101	—	—	—	—	Non-album singles
1969	"Hold Me, Thrill Me, Kiss Me" b/w "Yesterday"	Fontana	F-1679	—	—	—	—	Non-album singles

== See also ==
- List of artists who reached number one on the U.S. Adult Contemporary chart

== Bibliography ==
- Larkin, Colin. The Encyclopedia of Popular Music, 3rd edition, Macmillan, 1998.
- Ruppli, Michel; Novitsky, Ed. The Mercury Labels. A Discography, Vol. V., record and artist indexes, Greenwood Press, 1993.
- Whitburn, Joel. The Billboard Book of Top 40 Hits, 5th edition, Watson-Guptill Publications, 1992.
