= Navy Blue (Diane Renay song) =

Single by Diane Renay

from the album Navy Blue
- A-side: "Navy Blue" (originally recorded as a B-side, ZTSP 89337)
- B-side: "Unbelievable Guy" (originally recorded as an A-side, ZTSP 89336)
- Released: December 1963
- Recorded: 1963
- Genre: Pop, MOR
- Length: 2:05
- Label: 20th Century-Fox Records
- Songwriters: Bob Crewe, Bud Rehak, Eddie Rambeau
- Producer: Bob Crewe

Diane Renay singles chronology
"Navy Blue" (1963)	"Kiss Me Sailor" (1964)

"Navy Blue" is a song written by Bob Crewe, Bud Rehak and Eddie Rambeau. The song tells the story of a girl who was lonely for her steady boyfriend while he was away from home in the U.S. Navy and could hardly wait to see him again. The song's story is continued in "Kiss Me Sailor."

Recorded in 1963 by pop singer Diane Renay at the age of seventeen and released as a single, "Navy Blue" reached number six on the Billboard Hot 100 and topped the Middle-Road singles chart for one week in March 1964.

== Charts ==
Chart (1964)	Peak position
Canada CHUM Chart	7
Billboard Hot 100	6
Billboard Middle-Road Singles	1

== See also ==
- List of number-one adult contemporary singles of 1964 (U.S.)
