= Christian Petzold (composer) =

German composer and organist (1677–1733)

- Born: 15 March 1677; Weißig. near Königstein
- Died: 1733 (aged 55–56)
- Occupations: Composer; Organist

Christian Petzold (1677 – 1733) was a German composer and organist. He was active primarily in Dresden, Electorate of Saxony, and achieved a high reputation during his lifetime, but his surviving works are few. It was established in the 1970s that the famous Minuet in G major, previously attributed to Johann Sebastian Bach, was in fact the work of Petzold. The sprightly melody was used in the 1965 pop music hit "A Lover's Concerto" by the American group The Toys.

== Life ==
Petzold was born in Weißig near Königstein at some stage in 1677; his exact date of birth is unknown.

From 1703, he worked as an organist at St. Sophia (Sophienkirche) in Dresden, and in 1709 he became court chamber composer and organist. He led an active musical life, giving concert tours that took him as far as Paris (1714) and Venice (1716). In 1720, he wrote a piece for the consecration of the new Silbermann organ at St. Sophia, and he performed a similar task at Rötha, near Leipzig, where another Silbermann organ was built. He was also active as a teacher. His pupils included Carl Heinrich Graun.

Petzold died on 25 May 1733 and was buried three days later. His cause of death was recorded in the Dresden Kirchenwochenzettel as "Steckfluß" (choking rheum). The precise date of his death was given by the Dresden court musician Johann Samuel Kaÿser in an application (written two days after Petzold had died) seeking Petzold's position as organist in St. Sophia. Instead, Wilhelm Friedemann Bach was appointed in Petzold's place at the church, while the Italian-born composer Giovanni Alberto Ristori succeeded Petzold at the Dresden court.

== Legacy ==
Contemporaries held Petzold in high regard. Johann Mattheson and Ernst Ludwig Gerber both praised his skills, referring to him as "one of the most famous organists" and "one of the most pleasant church composers of the time", respectively. However, only a few of Petzold's pieces are extant today. He is best remembered for a pair of minuets that were copied into the 1725 Notebook for Anna Magdalena Bach, compiled by Anna Magdalena Bach and her husband Johann Sebastian Bach. One of these minuets, the Minuet in G major, achieved wide recognition, but for centuries was attributed to Johann Sebastian Bach. Petzold's authorship was only established in the 1970s.

Petzold always signed his name as Pezold.

== Selected works ==
=== Vocal ===
- Cantata Meine Seufzer, meine Klagen

=== Ensemble ===
- Three trio sonatas

=== Solo instrumental ===
- Minuets in G major and G minor
- Two partitas for solo viola d'amore
- Recueil de 25 concerts pour le clavecin (1729), 25 harpsichord solo concertos
- Orgeltabulatur (1704), chorale settings for organ
- 11 fugues for organ or harpsichord
- A suite and single pieces for harpsichord
