= Disco-Tex and the Sex-O-Lettes =

American disco group

- Origin: The Bronx, New York City
- Genre: Disco
- Years active: 1974–1976, 1981–1982
- Labels: Mercury, Chelsea, Polydor
- Past members: Monti Rock III; Bob Crewe; Kenny Nolan; Cidny Bullens; Jocelyn Brown

Disco-Tex and the Sex-O-Lettes were a disco group of the 1970s, featuring Monti Rock III (born Joseph Montanez, Jr.). The band is best known for their two disco hits: "Get Dancin'" (1974), and "I Wanna Dance Wit' Choo (Doo Dat Dance)" (1975).

== History ==
=== Foundation and lineup ===
"Disco-Tex and the Sex-O-Lettes" were founded in 1974 by Bob Crewe. He created the Disco-Tex character as a vehicle for Monti Rock, who at the time was largely a "famous for being famous" television talk show guest.

The Sex-O-Lettes included Jocelyn Brown and Cindy Bullens (though Bullens took part only in the studio, declining to tour, and later expressing embarrassment for having been involved in the project).

=== Hit songs ===
They released two albums: Disco-Tex & His Sex-O-Lettes Review (1975), and Manhattan Millionaire (1976). Their biggest hits were 1974's "Get Dancin'" (No. 10 US, No. 8 UK and Canada) and 1975's "I Wanna Dance Wit' Choo (Doo Dat Dance)" (No. 23 US, No. 6 UK). "Get Dancin'" ranked No. 82 in the charts of Canadian hits of 1975, and No. 100 in the American one of the same year.

== In popular culture ==
"Get Dancin'" is featured in two The Simpsons episodes. In 1990 episode "Bart vs. Thanksgiving", it is performed by the fictional group "Hooray for Everything". A decade later, it was featured in "I'm Goin' to Praiseland" during Disco Stu's hallucination of Heaven.

"I Wanna Dance Wit Choo" appeared in Tales Of Television Centre, American Bandstand, and The Basil Brush Show.

"Get Dancin'" had also made its appearance in Uutishuone and The Spirit of 76.

The Pet Shop Boys song ""Electricity" from the album Bilingual mentions Disco Tex and the Sex-o-Lettes in its lyrics.

Elvis Costello references "Disco Tex and The Sex-o-lettes" in the lyrics for his song "Invasion Hit Parade" on his 1991 album Mighty Like A Rose.

== Discography ==
=== Albums ===
Year	Title	Peak chart positions				Label
Year	Title	US	US R&B	AUS	CAN	Label
1975	Disco-Tex & His Sex-O-Lettes Review	36	20	34	34	Chelsea Records
1976	Manhattan Millionaire	—	—	—	—	Chelsea Records
1977	A Piece of the Rock (Sir Monti Rock III)	—	—	—	—	Polydor Records
"—" denotes releases that did not chart or were not released in that territory.

=== Compilation album ===
- Get Dancin': The Story of Disco-Tex & His Sex-O-Lettes (1999, Chelsea Records / Sequel Records)

=== Singles ===
Year	Title	Peak chart positions							Record label	B-side	Album
Year	Title	US	US Dance	US R&B	US Disco	UK	AUS	CAN	Record label	B-side	Album
1965	"For Days and Days" (as Monti Rock III)	—	—	—	—	—	—	—	Mercury Records	"Trouble"	
1974	"Get Dancin'"	10	3	32	1	8	19	8	Chelsea Records	"Get Dancin', Part II"	Disco Tex & His Sex-O-Lettes Review
1975	"I Wanna Dance Wit' Choo (Doo Dat Dance)"	23	7	33	3	6	100	24	Chelsea Records	"I Wanna Dance Wit' Choo (Doo Dat Dance), Part II"	Disco Tex & His Sex-O-Lettes Review
1975	"Jam Band"	80	—	—	—	—	—	—	Chelsea Records	"Jam Band Reprise"	Disco Tex & His Sex-O-Lettes Review
1975	"Boogie Flap"	—	—	—	—	51	—	—	Chelsea Records	"(I See Your) Name Up in Lights"	Disco Tex & His Sex-O-Lettes Review
1976	"Hot Lava"	—	27	—	—	—	—	—	Chelsea Records	"Hot Lava, Part II"	Manhattan Millionaire
1976	"Dancin' Kid"	60	—	99	—	—	—	—	Chelsea Records	"Dancin' Kid"	Manhattan Millionaire
1976	"We're Havin' a Party (It's Gonna Be Alright)"	—	—	—	—	—	—	—	Chelsea Records	"Strollin"	Manhattan Millionaire
1976	"Ride a Wild Horse"	—	27	—	—	—	—	—	Chelsea Records	"Hey There Little Fire Fly"	Manhattan Millionaire
1982	"In Havana" (as Monti Rock III)	—	—	—	—	—	—	—	Polydor Records	"Hot Town Streets"	
"—" denotes releases that did not chart or were not released in that territory.

== See also ==
- List of disco artists (A–E)
