= Sandy Linzer =

American songwriter, lyricist, and record producer (born 1941)

- Birth name: Sanford Roy Linzer
- Born: 1941 (age 83–84)
- Occupation(s): Songwriter, lyricist, record producer
- Years active: 1960s–present

Sanford Roy Linzer (born 1941) is an American songwriter, lyricist, and record producer, who is best known for his songwriting collaborations with Denny Randell and Bob Crewe in the 1960s and 1970s. He co-wrote hits including "A Lover's Concerto", "Let's Hang On!", "Working My Way Back to You", "Breakin' Down the Walls of Heartache", "Native New Yorker", and "Use It Up and Wear It Out". He was nominated with Randell for induction into the Songwriters Hall of Fame (SHOF) in 2012.

== Life and career ==
In the early 1960s, Al Kasha, an associate of singer, songwriter and record producer Bob Gaudio, introduced Linzer to Randell. They began writing together in 1963, initially for The Rag Dolls and Barbara Lewis. The pair wrote several Top 10 songs for Frankie Valli and The Four Seasons, including "Working My Way Back to You" (also a hit for The Spinners in 1979, and in Ireland for Boyzone in 1994), "Opus 17 (Don't You Worry 'Bout Me)", and, with Bob Crewe, "Let's Hang On!". Linzer also co-wrote the group's song "Dawn (Go Away)".

In 1965, Randell and Linzer wrote and produced most of the songs for the R&B girl group The Toys, including their singles "A Lover's Concerto" (adapted from Minuet in G major, once attributed to Johann Sebastian Bach but now to Christian Petzold) and "Attack!". Another Toys recording written by the duo, "Can't Get Enough Of You Baby", was later covered by the garage band ? and the Mysterians and, in 1998, was a #14 hit when covered by Smash Mouth. They also had a hit with Jay and the Techniques' "Keep the Ball Rollin'". Linzer and Randell established their own record label, Oliver, in 1966. They wrote two songs recorded by The Monkees, "I'll Be Back Up On My Feet" and "The Day We Fall in Love", and "Penny Arcade" by The Cyrkle. They later wrote "Native New Yorker", performed by Odyssey on the soundtrack of the film Eyes of Laura Mars; it was later featured in the film The Nanny Diaries and the final year of HBO’s Sex and the City. Other co-writes and co-productions include "Breakin' Down the Walls of Heartache", a major UK hit in 1968 for Johnny Johnson and the Bandwagon, and Samantha Sang's 1978 chart hit "You Keep Me Dancin'". He also co-produced "You Can Do Magic", a 1973 UK top ten and US Hot 100 hit for Limmie and the Family Cookin'. He produced the eponymous 1976 album by Dr. Buzzard's Original Savannah Band, including the hit single "Cherchez La Femme", as well as band leader Cory Daye's first solo album.

In 1980, he returned to working with Odyssey, co-writing (with L. Russell Brown) and producing the no. 1 UK hit "Use It Up and Wear It Out". He later co-wrote, with David Wolfert, "I Believe in You and Me", originally recorded in 1982 by The Four Tops. The song was covered by Whitney Houston for the soundtrack of the 1996 film The Preacher's Wife and became a no. 4 hit single. Linzer also teamed up with Kool & The Gang on Fresh, which was a worldwide hit in 1985.

Linzer also wrote the lyrics for the song "Spanish Eyes", recorded by the Backstreet Boys on their 1999 album Millennium. In 2001 he produced and co-wrote the songs on Billy Gilman's self-titled album. By 2007, he was working on joint projects with Charlie Calello on TV show proposals, and creating musical greetings cards.

== Copyright lawsuit ==
A copyright lawsuit against Dua Lipa by songwriters L. Russell Brown and Linzer "claimed that Levitating infringed on their 1979 disco song Wiggle and Giggle All Night".
