= Eddie Rambeau =

American singer, songwriter, and actor (born 1943)

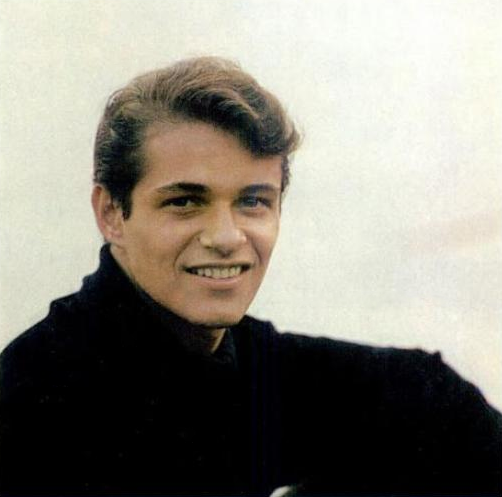
- Eddie Rambeau in 1965

Background information
- Born: Edward Cletus Fluri; June 30, 1943 (age 83); Hazleton, Pennsylvania, U.S.
- Genres: Pop
- Occupations: Singer, songwriter, actor
- Years active: 1961–present
- Labels: Swan, DynoVoice

Eddie Rambeau (born Edward Cletus Fluri; June 30, 1943) is an American singer, songwriter, and actor.

== Career ==
While performing in a high-school musical he had written, Rambeau met songwriter and musician Bud Rehak, who went on to become his manager.

With Rehak playing the piano, Rambeau sang at record hops and the like, where he impressed deejays with his talent. One of the deejays, Jim Ward from Plymouth, Pennsylvania, set up an audition for Rambeau at Swan Records. He was signed to the label and released his first single, "Skin Divin'", under his new name, Eddie Rambeau, on graduation day in June 1961. Now eighteen, Rambeau moved to Philadelphia, where Swan Records was based.

The following year, 1962, Rambeau recorded two more singles, "My Four Leaf Clover Love" and "Summertime Guy". Just minutes before he was about to debut the latter song on American Bandstand, he was informed by deejay Dick Biondi that, due to a potential conflict of interest, he would have to perform the B side of the record instead. "Summertime Guy" was written by Chuck Barris, who had also composed "Palisades Park" for Freddy Cannon earlier in the year.

Since Barris was employed by ABC at the time, and Bandstand aired on the same network, it was felt that Rambeau's performance of the song might create problems with the FCC. On top of that, the song was pulled from all ABC affiliates nationwide, both radio and television (Barris would later revamp the song as an instrumental to use for his television show The Newlywed Game). In December 1962, "The Push and Kick", written by Rambeau with Frank Slay Jr. and Bud Rehak, became a Top 40 hit for Mark Valentino.

During 1963, Rambeau began writing songs with Bob Crewe, who was also affiliated with Swan Records. Later in the year, Crewe needed a fourth song for a recording session he had scheduled with a new female singer he had recently discovered, Diane Renay. "Navy Blue", which was written by Rambeau, Rehak, and Crewe, became Renay's first and biggest hit record early in 1964, hitting the Top Ten on the Billboard Hot 100. A few months later, Rambeau and Rehak composed her follow-up single, "Kiss Me, Sailor", which made the Top 40. Rambeau relocated from Pennsylvania to New York City that year, to work with Crewe's organization as a staff songwriter and singer.

In addition to Mark Valentino and Diane Renay, other artists who have recorded songs written by Rambeau include Shirley Matthews ("Stop the Clock"), Dee Dee Sharp ("Push and Kick"), The Four Seasons ("Only Yesterday"), Engelbert Humperdinck ("If I Were You"), Shepherd Sisters ("If I Were You"), and Frank Sinatra Jr. ("Shadows on a Foggy Day").

In 1965, Rambeau heard a single called "Concrete and Clay" that Bob Crewe had brought back from a visit to the UK, where it had been recorded by a group called Unit 4 + 2, with vocals by its composers Tommy Moeller and Brian Parker. Rambeau recorded the song on DynoVoice Records, and his cover version came out about a week before the original Unit 4 + 2 version was released as a single by another label in the U.S. Both versions of "Concrete and Clay" made the United States Top 40, running about neck and neck as they jockeyed for position on the charts.

Rambeau subsequently released an LP titled Eddie Rambeau Sings Concrete and Clay, and he appeared on several musical variety shows that year, most notably Shindig! (twice), American Bandstand, and Where the Action Is. His follow-up singles, "My Name Is Mud" and "The Train", did not match the national success of "Concrete and Clay", which remains his biggest hit.

Rambeau recorded a few more singles for DynoVoice, including "Good Morning, Starshine" in 1968, which was released under the name Eddie Hazelton (as a nod to Rambeau's hometown of Hazleton). Coincidentally, a few years later Rambeau would appear in the Broadway production of Hair, the musical which spawned "Starshine" among other songs that went on to become hit records.

By the early 1970s, Rambeau had turned his attention to acting, and in addition to Hair, he was also a cast member of Jesus Christ, Superstar, Heathen!, and Tubstrip. He made a guest appearance on the television show The Secret Storm. In 1976, Rambeau produced the single "The Big Hurt" by The Front Runners, on Tom Cat Records.

During the 1980s and 1990s, Rambeau (now going by the name Ed Rambeau) broadened his repertoire to include the easy-listening genre and Broadway show tunes, and he resumed his live performing, mainly on cruises. In recent years, he also added photography and painting to his artistic portfolio. In the early 1990s, he began recording and marketing his own albums on cassette and CD. Today Rambeau continues to record and to keep in contact with his fan base by way of personal appearances, interviews, and the internet.

In 2026, Rambeau was announced as an inductee into the Luzerne County Arts & Entertainment Hall of Fame.

== Other sources ==
- Goldmine magazine, Vol. 18, No. 10, May 15, 1992 - "Eddie Rambeau" by Maxim W. Furek
- Ed Rambeau Biography by John J. Grecco - from the official Ed Rambeau website
- The Jordan Brothers: A Musical Biography of Rock's Fortunate Sons by Maxim W. Furek. Kimberley Press, 1986.
