= Denny Randell =

American songwriter and record producer

- Born: Dennis Joel Rafkin; 1941 (age 84–85); New York City
- Occupations: Songwriter, record producer
- Years active: 1960s–present
- Website: www.dennyrandell.com

Dennis Joel Rafkin (born 1941), known professionally as Denny Randell, is an American songwriter and record producer, who is best known for his songwriting collaborations with Sandy Linzer and Bob Crewe in the 1960s and 1970s. He co-wrote hits including "A Lover's Concerto", "Let's Hang On!", "Working My Way Back to You", and "Native New Yorker", and was nominated with Linzer for induction into the Songwriters Hall of Fame (SHOF) in 2012.

== Life and career ==
Randell was born in New York City and later moved to Silver Spring, Maryland. He played piano and accordion, and performed in various local bands in his teens, as well as starting to write songs. One of his songs came to the attention of New York music publishing company Shapiro Bernstein, who started to employ him as a staff songwriter. This in turn led to his introduction to Bob Gaudio and Bob Crewe, the record producers and writers behind the success of The Four Seasons. Randell began working for the Four Seasons as a writer and arranger in the early 1960s.

Gaudio's associate, Al Kasha, introduced Randell to lyricist Sandy Linzer. The duo wrote several Top 10 songs for Frankie Valli and The Four Seasons, including "Working My Way Back to You" (also a hit for The Spinners in 1979, and in Ireland for Boyzone in 1994), "Opus 17 (Don't You Worry 'bout Me)", and, with Bob Crewe, "Let's Hang On!". Randell and Crewe later co-wrote Valli's solo hit "Swearin' to God".

In 1965, Randell and Linzer wrote and produced most of the songs for the R&B girl group, The Toys, including their singles "A Lover's Concerto" (adapted from "Minuet in G major", a classical music piece), and "Attack!" Another song written by the duo, "Can't Get Enough of You Baby", was first recorded by the Four Seasons and later covered by the Toys and the garage band ? and the Mysterians and, in 1998, was a #27 hit when covered by Smash Mouth. Randell and Lizner also wrote Jay and the Techniques' "Keep the Ball Rollin'".

Linzer and Randell wrote two songs recorded by The Monkees, "I'll Be Back Up On My Feet" and "The Day We Fall in Love", and "Penny Arcade" by The Cyrkle. They later wrote "Native New Yorker", performed by Odyssey on the soundtrack of the film Eyes of Laura Mars; it was later featured in the film The Nanny Diaries and the final year of HBO’s Sex and the City. Other co-writes include "Breakin' Down the Walls of Heartache", a major UK hit in 1968 for Johnny Johnson and the Bandwagon, and Samantha Sang's 1978 chart hit "You Keep Me Dancin'".

In the late 1960s and early 1970s, Randell worked in A&R for several companies, including Epic, RCA, and Frank Zappa's DiscReet Records, for whom he produced Tim Buckley's album Sefronia. He also produced the Iron Butterfly album Scorching Beauty. Later in the decade, he co-wrote and arranged the album Get Dancin’ by Disco Tex and the Sex-O-Lettes. In 1980 he co-wrote the Star Wars-themed album Christmas in the Stars, which featured singer John Bongiovi (later Jon Bon Jovi).

In 1985, he teamed up with songwriter and singer Biddy Schippers and formed the duo Randell & Schippers, who recorded a number of successful electronic dance tracks including Alice in Wonderland. The pair later married. In recent years they have worked together on the GI Jams project, which aims to develop and spotlight songwriting talents in the U.S. military.
