= DynoVoice Records =

- DynoVoice Logo 1967
- Founded: 1965
- Founder: Bob Crewe
- Defunct: 1969
- Distributor(s): Bell Records, Dot Records
- Country of origin: United States
- Location: New York NY

DynoVoice Records was an American record label, founded in 1965 by songwriter/producer Bob Crewe. The label started as Dyno-Vox, but was changed when the 5th single was issued. DynoVoice, along with its NewVoice Records subsidiary, was originally distributed by Bell Records, and later by Dot Records. The label existed until 1969 when it was merged into the Crewe Group of Companies (CGC) label. Some of the label's best-known releases include The Bob Crewe Generation's hit "Music to Watch Girls By", the soundtrack album for Dino de Laurentiis's camp sci-fi film Barbarella, and material by Mitch Ryder and the Detroit Wheels.

== Notable artists ==
- Eddie Rambeau
- The Toys
- The Bob Crewe Generation
- The Chicago Loop
- The Glitterhouse
- Mitch Ryder & the Detroit Wheels
- Steve Walker and the Bold
- Maggie Thrett

== See also ==
- List of record labels
