= Bob Crewe =

American songwriter and record producer (1930–2014)

- Born: Robert Stanley Crewe; November 12, 1930; Newark, New Jersey, U.S.
- Died: September 11, 2014 (aged 83) Scarborough, Maine, U.S.
- Genres: Pop; rock
- Occupations: Songwriter; record producer
- Instruments: Vocals; percussion
- Formerly of: Frankie Valli; The Four Seasons; Disco-Tex and the Sex-O-Lettes

Robert Stanley Crewe (November 12, 1930 – September 11, 2014) was an American songwriter, record producer, dancer and manager, best known mainly for co-writing and producing a string of Top 10 singles with Bob Gaudio for the 1960s pop rock band The Four Seasons.

As a songwriter, his most successful songs include "Silhouettes" (co-written with Frank Slay); "Big Girls Don't Cry", "Walk Like a Man", "Rag Doll", "Silence Is Golden", "The Sun Ain't Gonna Shine (Anymore)", "Can't Take My Eyes Off You", "Get Dancin' ", and "Bye, Bye, Baby" (all co-written with Gaudio); "Let's Hang On!" (co-written with Sandy Linzer and Denny Randell); and "My Eyes Adored You" and "Lady Marmalade" (both co-written with Kenny Nolan). He also had hit recordings with The Rays, Diane Renay, Mitch Ryder and the Detroit Wheels, Freddy Cannon, Lesley Gore, Oliver, Michael Jackson, Bobby Darin, Roberta Flack, Peabo Bryson, Patti LaBelle, Barry Manilow, and his own "Bob Crewe Generation".

== Early life ==
Born in Newark, New Jersey in 1930 and raised in Belleville, Crewe demonstrated an early gift for both art and music. Although lacking formal musical training, he gravitated to learning from many of the great 19th- and 20th-century classical romantic composers as well as giants of jazz and swing, including Stan Kenton, Harry James, Duke Ellington, Benny Goodman, and Tommy Dorsey. He studied for almost a year at Parsons School of Design in New York City with the intention of eventually pursuing a career in architecture.

== Career ==
=== The 1950s ===
In 1953, Crewe met and partnered professionally with Frank Slay, a young pianist from Texas. Their collaboration created several hit songs (as well as a small record label, XYZ), for which Crewe performed as the demo singer. Crewe and Slay's 1957 recording session with The Rays for XYZ (picked up nationally by Cameo Records) produced two major hit songs. "Silhouettes", produced by Crewe, became a doo-wop anthem of the era. Climbing to No. 3 on the Billboard Hot 100 in 1957, "Silhouettes" displayed the flair for story-driven lyrics, innovative musical hooks, and final lyrical twists that were to become known as Crewe trademarks. In 1965, with a slightly faster tempo, "Silhouettes" again became a hit, this time for the British group Herman's Hermits, reaching No. 5 on the Billboard Hot 100. Bob Dylan recorded "Silhouettes" during his legendary Basement Tapes sessions of the late 1960s, although his version was not released until 2014.

"Daddy Cool" was the B-side of the Rays' "Silhouettes" single. Written and produced by Crewe and Slay at the same 1957 session, it achieved considerable note. Both "Daddy Cool" and "Silhouettes" were covered the same year by the Canadian group The Diamonds, whose version of the former reached No. 10 on the Billboard charts. In 1961, Guy "Daddy Cool" Darrell released another single version on the Warwick label, and in 1977, the UK band Darts made the song their first-ever studio recording, scoring a No. 6 hit.

Crewe and Slay built on their success by signing a deal with new, Philadelphia-based Swan Records. Sessions with Billy and Lillie (singers Billy Ford and Lillie Bryant) produced the 1958 hit "Lah Dee Dah", which reached the No. 9 position on the Billboard Hot 100; the following year, Billy and Lillie's recording of "Lucky Ladybug" hit No. 14. Crewe and Slay also wrote two Top 10 hits - "Tallahassee Lassie" and "Okefenokee" - for Swan's rising star Freddy Cannon. Crewe also began to score his own hits, "Sweetie Pie" (US No. 111, 1959) and "The Whiffenpoof Song" (No. 96, 1960).

=== The early 1960s ===
As a solo singer, Crewe recorded a pair of albums in 1961, one of which included a Ralph Burns-produced swing version of Yale University's signature "The Whiffenpoof Song". The record became a major hit in New York and led to Crewe's receiving "teen heartthrob" coverage in such popular teen magazines as 16 Magazine, and to guest appearances with Mickey Rooney and Connie Francis on such TV variety shows as The Revlon Revue.

In the early 1960s, Crewe began writing with Bob Gaudio, who had risen to fame at age 15 as a member of The Royal Teens, for whom he had co-written the hit "Short Shorts". The first Crewe-Gaudio collaboration, "Sherry", was written by Gaudio and produced by Crewe. In 1962 it became a No. 1 single for Gaudio's new band, The Four Seasons, fronted by Frankie Valli. The pair wrote many other songs for the group, including the No. 1 hits "Big Girls Don't Cry", "Rag Doll", and "Walk Like a Man", as well as "Ronnie", "Bye, Bye, Baby (Baby, Goodbye)", and "Connie-O".

Crewe collaborated with Sandy Linzer and Denny Randell on the Four Seasons hit "Let's Hang On!". The band was also the first to record the Crewe-Gaudio composition "The Sun Ain't Gonna Shine (Anymore)", later covered virtually note-for-note by the American singing group The Walker Brothers, who recorded their No. 1 selling version in England; their version made the American Top 10 as well. The Crewe-Gaudio collaborations capitalized on the extraordinary and distinctive voice of Frankie Valli, who could effortlessly soar to a piercing, emotionally expressive falsetto that became one of the emblematic and widely imitated sounds of the era. Record sales racked up by the Four Seasons are estimated as being between anywhere from 100 million to 199 million.

As "the Four Seasons sound" became more and more defined, other signature touches emerged, including dense but pristine-sounding percussion, such as the military-sounding march cadences and drum-stomps of "Sherry", "Big Girls Don't Cry", and "Walk Like a Man". The sophisticated harmonic patterns of the group (largely formulated by their bass vocalist, Nick Massi, whom Crewe greatly valued) and punctuated by the distinctive falsetto of Frankie Valli were at once classic and innovative, as was Crewe's use of melancholy harmonica on "Big Man in Town", the space-age organ of "Save It for Me", and the otherworldly glissandos of "Candy Girl".

In addition to his work with the Four Seasons, Crewe produced recording sessions for artists such as Dee Dee Sharp, The Orlons, Ben E. King, and The Highwaymen (On a New Road). With Bud Rehak and Eddie Rambeau he co-wrote "Navy Blue" for singer Diane Renay, and also produced it. Renay's recording made the Top 10 on the US pop chart in early 1964, and No. 1 on the Adult Contemporary Chart.

=== The mid-to-late 1960s ===
In 1965, Crewe formed his own record label, DynoVoice Records. With the release of the 1965 hit "Concrete and Clay" by Eddie Rambeau, DynoVoice launched a run of twenty-one Top 100 hits. The label found early success with the R&B trio The Toys, best known for their songs "A Lover's Concerto", a No. 2 hit single, and "Attack". The Toys were produced by Sandy Linzer and Denny Randell for executive producer Crewe.

Another DynoVoice powerhouse of the mid-1960s emerged when Crewe discovered a group called Billy Lee & The Rivieras. The band had limited success until he renamed them Mitch Ryder & the Detroit Wheels. Under his direction, they scored No. 11 on Top 100 hits, most notably Crewe's powerful and muscular arrangements of their 1966 cover of the song "Devil with a Blue Dress On", the act's highest-charting single which peaked No. 4, as well as "Sock It to Me, Baby!", a No. 6 hit in 1967, and "Jenny Take a Ride", which reached No. 10 in 1965.

Another often-recorded song from the 1965 album by the Toys is "Can't Get Enough of You Baby". The single, written and produced by the Linzer-Randell couple, was also recorded by the rock group ? and the Mysterians from Bay City, Michigan, best known for their 1966 hit "96 Tears". "Can't Get Enough of You Baby" has enjoyed subsequent reinterpretations by The Colourfield and Smash Mouth, among many others.

Crewe's record label scored another hit with Norma Tanega's off-beat, folksy "Walkin' My Cat Named Dog". Crewe also helped bring success to the Epic Records band The Tremeloes with their hit cover of "Silence Is Golden", a song originally written for and recorded by The Four Seasons.

Bob Crewe himself (recording as The Bob Crewe Generation) released a version of Sid Ramin's 1967 instrumental "Music to Watch Girls By" (originally composed as a Diet Pepsi commercial jingle) on DynoVoice. The song became a Top 20 hit, and spawned another successful instrumental version by Al Hirt and also a vocal hit by Andy Williams. In 1967, Bob Crewe produced and wrote seven of the songs sung by Lesley Gore on her last commercially successful album, California Nights, including production of the title track. The Bob Crewe Generation also recorded the original soundtrack (composed by Crewe and Charles Fox) for the 1968 Paramount Pictures motion picture Barbarella, starring Jane Fonda and directed by Roger Vadim. The soundtrack for the cult favorite features vocals by Crewe and the group The Glitterhouse.

In 1967, Crewe and Gaudio scored one of their greatest successes with "Can't Take My Eyes Off You", recorded by Frankie Valli with The Four Seasons. The song reached No. 2 on the Billboard Hot 100 and earned a gold record. "Can't Take My Eyes Off You" has since been recorded by a wide variety of music groups and solo artists, in several different languages. A 1968 version by singer Andy Williams climbed to No. 5 on the UK Singles Chart. Also achieving chart status over the decades were English-language versions by The Lettermen, Maureen McGovern, Boys Town Gang and Lauryn Hill. The song has been heard in numerous motion pictures, including The Deer Hunter, The Fabulous Baker Boys, Conspiracy Theory, 10 Things I Hate About You, Drop Dead Gorgeous, Bridget Jones's Diary, and Jersey Boys.

In 1969, Crewe collaborated with the singer Oliver, producing his pop hit "Jean", a song written by poet Rod McKuen which served as theme to the Oscar-winning film The Prime of Miss Jean Brodie, starring Maggie Smith. Crewe also produced another song performed by Oliver, the optimistic "Good Morning Starshine" from the dance rock musical Hair. The single reached No. 3 on both the Billboard Hot 100 and Easy Listening singles surveys.

The Crewe record label released a series of well-received recordings such as Ben Bagley's Cole Porter Revisited and Rodgers and Hart Revisited featuring vocal performances by such artists as Harold Arlen, Elaine Stritch, Dorothy Loudon, Anthony Perkins, Ann Hampton Callaway, Bobby Short, Jerry Orbach, Tammy Grimes, and Blossom Dearie.

Crewe was a guest on The Jack Spector Show, and was interviewed by Dick Clark on ABC-TV programs like American Bandstand and Where the Action Is, where he sang some of his current 1960's songs, such as "The Whiffenpoof Song," which were played for the dancers and the crowds.

=== The 1970s ===
"The Bob Crewe Generation" late 1969 album Let Me Touch You, including covers of Henry Mancini's "Moon River" and "Two For The Road", arranged by Charles Fox, remains a favorite of lounge music collectors. It was also their only quadraphonic release. The Bob Crewe Generation briefly reappeared as a chart act in the mid-1970s, recording material for the disco era. The 1976 LP Street Talk on Elektra Records was in this vein.

In 1975, Crewe wrote and produced disco issues for The Eleventh Hour, an act who had dance club success with at least three releases on 20th Century Records: "Hollywood Hot" (45 rpm single, number: TC-2215), "Bumper to Bumper", and "Sock It To Me/It's Your Thing".

In the mid-1970s, Crewe and Sir Monti Rock III formed the disco club favorites Disco-Tex and the Sex-O-Lettes, best known for their 1975 hits "Get Dancin'" and "I Wanna Dance Wit' Choo (Doo Dat Dance)". The band is referenced by Elvis Costello in his song "Invasion Hit Parade" and by The Pet Shop Boys in their song "Electricity".

In 1977, at the insistence of producer Jerry Wexler, who had been one of his early mentor, Crewe recorded a solo album in Memphis, with Barry Beckett co-producing. It was titled Motivation, and was a showcase for his singing voice. Although the LP did not achieve chart success, it included the ballad "Marriage Made In Heaven", a collaboration between Crewe and Kenny Nolan which later became popular with Carolina beach music groups. The album also produced the song "It Took a Long Time (For The First Time In My Life)", also recorded by Patti LaBelle.

Crewe and Nolan had previously written two other songs - "My Eyes Adored You" and "Lady Marmalade" - which became back-to-back No. 1 hits in 1975. "My Eyes Adored You" was produced by Crewe and performed by Frankie Valli with The Four Seasons. When the label, Mowest Records, balked at releasing it, Crewe, certain of its quality and hit potential, bought back the rights for $4,000 and it was issued on Private Stock Records. Despite widespread rejections from music industry pundits, the song became a smash solo hit for Valli, and was the fifth biggest song of the year.

"Lady Marmalade", recorded by Labelle, became notorious for its sexually provocative, New Orleans-inflected chorus, "Voulez-vous coucher avec moi, ce soir?". Produced by Allen Toussaint, the song became a radio and dance club sensation. When it reached No. 1 on the U.S. Billboard Hot 100, it displaced "My Eyes Adored You". Both songs spent one week at No. 1. "Lady Marmalade" has since been used in numerous motion pictures, including Cheech and Chong's The Corsican Brothers, Beethoven, Carlito's Way, The Birdcage, The Long Kiss Goodnight, and Semi-Pro.

=== The 1980s and 1990s ===
In 1984, a collaboration by Crewe and writers Jerry Corbetta and Bob Gaudio produced another Billboard Top 100 success, the romantic duet "You're Looking Like Love To Me", sung by Roberta Flack and Peabo Bryson. Another Crewe-Corbetta project united them with singer-songwriter-producer Ellie Greenwich, for whom they produced the original cast album of Greenwich's Broadway musical Leader of the Pack. The album was a Grammy Award nominee and the show itself was nominated for a Tony Award.

In 1985, Crewe was inducted into the Songwriter's Hall of Fame.

In 1999, when the US performing rights and royalties organization BMI (Broadcast Music Incorporated) announced its Top 100 Songs of the Century, "Can't Take My Eyes Off You" by Frankie Valli landed in the Top 10 with six million airplays. BMI calculates one million continuous performances of a song of the average length (3 minutes) as representing 5.7 years of continuous airplay.

=== The 2000s and 2010s ===
"Lady Marmalade" was re-recorded by Christina Aguilera, Lil' Kim, Mya, and Pink for the soundtrack of the 2001 film Moulin Rouge!, and their version stayed at No. 1 in the U.S. for five weeks. It achieved the same chart position in the United Kingdom and Australia. Rolling Stone ranked "Lady Marmalade" as the 479th greatest song of all time.

In addition to his numerous benchmarks and accolades in music, Crewe also achieved recognition as an artist; he designed a number of album covers and had highly successful one-man gallery showings of his paintings at the Earl McGrath Gallery, Thomas Soloman's Garage, and the Jan Baum Gallery in Los Angeles.

Since 2005, Crewe was featured as a supporting character (played originally by Peter Gregus) in Jersey Boys, the long-running, multiple Tony Award-winning Broadway musical based on the story of Frankie Valli and The Four Seasons. Although the 2014 film version (with Mike Doyle as Crewe) was only a modest success, the play has gone on to become an international hit, with Crewe credited as the show's lyricist. He used his proceeds from the show to start a foundation supporting gay rights, people with AIDS, and bringing music and art to children in deprived communities.

== Personal life ==
While Crewe was portrayed as openly gay in the Jersey Boys stage musical and film, his brother Dan Crewe told an interviewer that his brother was discreet about his bisexuality, particularly during the time he was working with The Four Seasons. "Whenever he met someone, he would go into what I always called his John Wayne mode, this extreme machoism", Dan Crewe told The New York Times.

From April 2014 until his death, Crewe resided in a Scarborough, Maine nursing home. His charity, the Bob Crewe Foundation, donated $3 million to the Maine College of Art in April 2014.

Crewe died in the nursing home on September 11, 2014, at the age of 83. He had been in declining health for several years following a fall.

== Selected U.S. singles (written and/or produced by) ==
US peak chart position on the Billboard Hot 100 singles chart follows the song title. Only singles that reached a position of No. 30 or higher on the Hot 100 are listed here.

- 1957: "Silhouettes", The Rays, No. 3
- 1957: "Silhouettes", The Diamonds, No. 10
- 1958: "La Dee Dah", Billy & Lillie, No. 9
- 1958: "Sweet Talk", sung by Crewe
- 1959: "Lucky Ladybug", Billy & Lillie, No. 14
- 1962: "Sherry", The Four Seasons, No. 1
- 1962: "Big Girls Don't Cry", The Four Seasons, No. 1
- 1963: "Walk Like a Man", The Four Seasons, No. 1
- 1964: "Dawn (Go Away)", The Four Seasons, No. 3
- 1964: "Ronnie", The Four Seasons, No. 6
- 1964: "Navy Blue", Diane Renay, No. 6
- 1964: "Rag Doll", The Four Seasons, No. 1
- 1964: "Save It For Me", The Four Seasons, No. 10
- 1964: "Big Man in Town", The Four Seasons, No. 20
- 1965: "Bye, Bye, Baby (Baby, Goodbye)", The Four Seasons, No. 12 ("Bye Bye Baby" on initial release)
- 1965: "Let's Hang On!", The Four Seasons, No. 3
- 1965: "A Lover's Concerto", The Toys, No. 2
- 1965: "Silhouettes", Herman's Hermits, No. 5
- 1965: "Girl Come Running", The Four Seasons, No. 30
- 1965: "Jenny Take A Ride", Mitch Ryder and the Detroit Wheels, No. 10
- 1966: "Devil With A Blue Dress On", Mitch Ryder and the Detroit Wheels, No. 4
- 1966: "The Sun Ain't Gonna Shine", The Walker Bros., No. 13
- 1967: "Sock It To Me, Baby", Mitch Ryder and the Detroit Wheels, No. 6
- 1967: "Music To Watch Girls By", The Bob Crewe Generation, No. 15
- 1967: "Silence Is Golden", The Tremeloes, No. 11
- 1967: "Can't Take My Eyes Off Of You", Frankie Valli, No. 2
- 1967: "I Make a Fool of Myself", Frankie Valli, No. 18
- 1967: "To Give (The Reason I Live)", Frankie Valli, No. 29
- 1969: "Jean", Oliver, No. 2
- 1974: "Lady Marmalade", LaBelle, No. 1
- 1974: "Get Dancin'", Disco Tex & His Sex-O-Lettes, No. 10
- 1975: "My Eyes Adored You", Frankie Valli, No. 1
- 1975: "Swearin' To God", Frankie Valli, No. 6
- 1975: "I Wanna Dance Wit' Choo (Doo Dat Dance)", Disco Tex & His Sex-O-Lettes, No. 23
- 1975: "The Proud One", The Osmonds, No. 22
- 2001: "Lady Marmalade", Christina Aguilera, Lil' Kim, Mya, and Pink, No. 1

== Recording discography ==
- Kicks, Warwick W-2009 (1960, out of print)
- Crazy In The Heart, Warwick W-2034 (1961, out of print)
- All The Song Hits of the Four Seasons, Philips 600150 (1964, out of print)
- Bob Crewe Plays the Four Seasons' hits, Philips 600238 (1967, out of print)
- Music To Watch Girls By, DynoVoice 9003 (1967, out of print)
- Music To Watch Birds By, DynoVoice 1902 [U.K.] (1967, out of print)
- Barbarella (Original Soundtrack Recording), originally published by Famous Music Corporation (1968, out of print), re-released by Soundtrack Classics SCL 1411 (2004)
- Let Me Touch You, CGC 1000 (1969, out of print)
- Street Talk, Elektra Records 7E-1083 (1976, out of print)
- Motivation, Elektra Records 7E-1103 (1977, out of print)
- The Best of The Bob Crewe Generation, Varèse Vintage 302 066 703 2 (Feb 2006)
