= Donny Osmond discography =

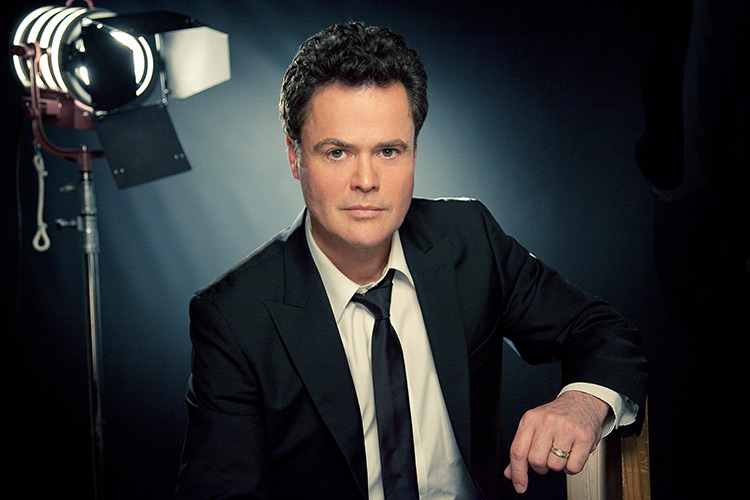
- Studio albums: 18
- Extended plays: 3
- Live albums: 1
- Compilation albums: 9
- Singles: 25
- Video albums: 4
- Music videos: 4
- Other appearances: 8

The discography of American pop singer Donny Osmond contains 18 studio albums, nine compilation albums, one live album, four video albums, three extended plays, four music videos, 25 singles, and eight additional appearances. After several years collaborating with his siblings' band, The Osmonds, he embarked on a solo career in 1971. His debut single, "Sweet and Innocent," reached number seven on the Billboard Hot 100 and made him a teen pop star. Its follow-up entitled "Go Away Little Girl" topped the same chart in 1971. Also in 1971 his debut studio album was released called The Donny Osmond Album. It peaked at number 13 on the Billboard 200 all-genre chart. His third studio release, Portrait of Donny, reached number six on the Billboard 200 and is his highest-charting album to date. Its two singles became top ten hits on the pop chart: "Hey Girl" and "Puppy Love." He released his fourth studio effort in 1972, Too Young. The record peaked at number 11 on the Billboard 200. It spawned the top 20 pop hits: the title track and "Why." In 1973, Alone Together marked his fifth studio album release and peaked at number 26 in the United States. It spawned his cover of "The Twelfth of Never," which reached number eight on the Hot 100 and number one on the U.K. singles chart. By the mid-1970s, Osmond reached adulthood and his career began to decline despite collaborations with his sister, Marie Osmond. In 1976, he recorded an album of disco (Disco Train), which only reached number 145 on the Billboard 200.

Although Osmond continued performing his popularity had declined. Yet, in 1989 he returned with the single "Soldier of Love." It became his biggest hit in over a decade on the Hot 100, reaching number two in 1989. His self-titled studio album was also released in 1989 and peaked at number 54 on the Billboard 200. He followed it with 1990's Eyes Don't Lie, which reached number 177 on the all-genre chart. It spawned the single "My Love Is a Fire," which climbed to number 21 on the Hot 100. He worked on various film, television and theater projects during the remainder of the decade. He then released an album of show-tunes entitled This Is the Moment. The project peaked at number 64 on the Billboard 200 list. He then followed it with a collection of love songs in 2002 called Somewhere in Time.

In 2007, Osmond's studio album, Love Songs of the 70's, was his highest-charting record in many years, peaking at number 27 on the all-genre survey. In 2014, he released a collection of cover tunes in an album called The Soundtrack of My Life. His most recent album release is from 2021 and is called Start Again.

== Albums ==
=== Studio albums ===
List of albums, with selected chart positions and certifications, showing other relevant details
Title	Album details	Peak chart positions					Certifications
Title	Album details	US	AUS	CAN	NZ	UK	Certifications
The Donny Osmond Album	Released: June 5, 1971; Label: MGM; Formats: LP, cassette	13	—	2	—	—	RIAA: Gold
To You with Love, Donny	Released: October 11, 1971; Label: MGM; Formats: LP, cassette	12	—	31	—	—	RIAA: Gold
Portrait of Donny	Released: May 27, 1972; Label: MGM; Formats: LP, cassette	6	55	5	—	5	RIAA: Gold
Too Young	Released: July 15, 1972; Label: MGM; Formats: LP, cassette	11	30	12	—	7	RIAA: Gold
Alone Together	Released: March 17, 1973; Label: MGM; Formats: LP, cassette	26	28	22	—	6	BPI: Gold
A Time for Us	Released: November 1973; Label: MGM; Formats: LP, cassette	58	64	65	—	4	BPI: Gold
Donny	Released: December 7, 1974; Label: MGM; Formats: LP, cassette	57	—	65	32	16	BPI: Gold
Disco Train	Released: August 21, 1976; Label: Kolob/Polydor; Formats: LP, cassette	145	—	—	—	59	
Donald Clark Osmond	Released: August 6, 1977; Label: Kolob/Polydor; Formats: LP, cassette	169	—	—	—	—	
Donny Osmond	Released: April 25, 1989; Label: Capitol; Formats: LP, cassette, CD	54	—	61	—	—	
Eyes Don't Lie	Released: October 30, 1990; Label: Capitol; Formats: LP, cassette, CD	177	—	—	—	—	
Christmas at Home	Released: October 6, 1997; Label: Nightstar; Formats: Cassette, CD	—	—	—	—	—	
This Is the Moment	Released: February 6, 2001; Label: Decca; Formats: CD	64	—	—	—	10	
Somewhere in Time	Released: October 29, 2002; Label: Decca; Formats: Cassette, CD	—	—	—	9	12	BPI: Platinum
What I Meant to Say	Released: December 28, 2004; Label: Decca; Formats: CD	137	—	—	—	26	BPI: Silver
Love Songs of the '70s	Released: May 5, 2007; Label: Decca; Formats: CD, music download	27	—	—	—	7	BPI: Gold
The Soundtrack of My Life	Released: November 10, 2014; Label: Decca; Formats: CD, music download	189	—	—	—	17	
Start Again	Released: September 10, 2021; Label: BMG; Formats: LP, CD, music download	—	—	—	—	—	
"—" denotes a recording that did not chart or was not released in that territory.

=== Compilation albums ===
List of albums, with selected chart positions and certifications, showing other relevant details
Title	Album details	Peak chart positions			Certifications
Title	Album details	US	CAN	UK	Certifications
My Best to You	Released: December 9, 1972; Label: MGM; Formats: LP, cassette	29	—	—	RIAA: Gold
Superstar	Released: 1973; Label: K-tel/Kolob; Formats: LP	—	9	—	
Greatest Hits	Released: 1992; Label: Curb; Formats: CD	—	—	—	
The Best of Donny Osmond	Released: May 17, 1994; Label: Capitol/Curb; Formats: CD	—	—	—	
25 Hits Special Collection	Released: November 7, 1995; Label: Curb; Formats: CD	—	—	—	
The Best of Donny Osmond	Released: November 1995; Label: Capitol/EMI; Formats: CD	—	—	—	
20th Century Masters: The Millennium Collection	Released: August 6, 2002; Label: Polydor; Formats: CD	—	—	—	
From Donny...with Love	Released: February 25, 2008; Label: Decca; Formats: CD, music download	—	—	8	
The Definitive Collection	Released: December 15, 2009; Label: Polydor; Formats: CD, music download	—	—	—	
"—" denotes a recording that did not chart or was not released in that territory.

=== Live albums ===
List of albums, with selected chart positions, showing other relevant details
Title	Album details	Peak chart positions
Title	Album details	UK
One Night Only!	Released: July 14, 2017; Label: Gonzo; Formats: CD, music download	80

=== Extended plays ===
List of extended play albums, with other relevant details
Title	Album details
Hey Girl	Released: 1971; Label: MGM; Formats: LP
Sweet and Innocent	Released: 1971; Label: MGM; Formats: LP
Four	Released: 1997; Label: Nightstar; Formats: CD

== Singles ==
=== As lead artist ===
List of singles, with selected chart positions and certifications, showing other relevant details
Title	Year	Peak chart positions								Certifications	Album
Title	Year	US	US AC	AUS	CAN	IRL	NLD	NZ	UK	Certifications	Album
"Sweet and Innocent"	1971	7	—	52	3	—	—	—	—	RIAA: Gold	The Donny Osmond Album
"Go Away Little Girl"	1971	1	14	52	1	—	—	—	—	RIAA: Gold	To You with Love, Donny
"Hey Girl"	1971	9	21	82	4	—	—	—	—	RIAA: Gold	Portrait of Donny
"Puppy Love"	1972	3	—	1	1	2	19	1	1	RIAA: Gold	Portrait of Donny
"Too Young"	1972	13	23	13	6	2	—	3	5		Too Young
"Why"	1972	13	19	25	14	4	—	—	3		Too Young
"The Twelfth of Never"	1973	8	7	4	4	3	12	5	1	RIAA: Gold	Alone Together
"Young Love"	1973	25	26	10	4	1	7	—	1	BPI: Silver	Alone Together
"A Million to One"	1973	23	26	—	4	—	—	—	—		A Time for Us
"When I Fall in Love"	1973	55	31	—	—	10	8	—	4	BPI: Silver	A Time for Us
"Are You Lonesome Tonight"	1973	14	31	30	8	10	—	—	—		A Time for Us
"Where Did All the Good Times Go"	1974	—	—	—	—	—	—	—	18		Donny
"I Have a Dream"	1974	50	45	—	—	—	—	—	—		Donny
"C'mon Marianne"	1976	38	25	—	40	—	—	—	51 (Note: Chart position is from the official UK "Breakers List".)		Disco Train
"You've Got Me Dangling on a String"	1977	— (Note: "You've Got Me Dangling on a String" peaked at number 9 on the Billboard Bubbling Under Hot 100 singles chart, a list which acts as a 25-song extension of the Hot 100.)	—	—	—	—	—	—	—		Donald Clark Osmond
"I'm in It for Love"	1987	—	—	—	—	16	54	—	70		Donny Osmond
"Groove"	1987	—	—	—	—	—	—	—	77		Donny Osmond
"Soldier of Love"	1988	2	20	—	3	—	—	—	29		Donny Osmond
"If It's Love That You Want"	1988	—	—	—	—	—	—	—	70		Donny Osmond
"Sacred Emotion"	1989	13	4	—	14	—	—	—	—		Donny Osmond
"Hold On"	1989	73	—	—	—	—	—	—	—		Donny Osmond
"I'll Be Good to You"	1990	—	10	—	—	—	—	—	—		Donny Osmond
"My Love Is a Fire"	1990	21	—	—	27	—	—	—	64		Eyes Don't Lie
"Sure Lookin'"	1991	54	—	—	—	—	—	—	—		Eyes Don't Lie
"Love Will Survive"	1991	—	24	—	—	—	—	—	—		Eyes Don't Lie
"Any Dream Will Do"	1992	—	—	—	—	—	—	—	—		Joseph and the Amazing Technicolor Dreamcoat
"I've Been Looking for Christmas"	1997	—	—	—	—	—	—	—	—		Christmas at Home
"This Is the Moment"	2001	—	—	—	—	—	—	—	—		This Is the Moment
"Seasons of Love"	2001	—	—	—	—	—	—	—	—		This Is the Moment
"Without You"	2002	—	—	—	—	—	—	—	—		Somewhere in Time
"Breeze On By"	2004	—	37	—	—	—	—	—	8		What I Meant to Say
"Keep Her in Mind"	2004	—	—	—	—	—	—	—	—		What I Meant to Say
"What I Meant to Say"	2004	—	—	—	—	—	—	—	—		What I Meant to Say
"Christmas Time"	2004	—	—	—	—	—	—	—	—		What I Meant to Say
"I'll Make a Man Out of You"	2004	—	—	—	—	—	—	—	—	RIAA: 3× Platinum; BPI: Gold	Mulan (soundtrack)
"Whenever You're in Trouble"	2011	—	—	—	—	—	—	—	—		—N/a
"Could She Be Mine"	2014	—	—	—	—	—	—	—	—		The Soundtrack of My Life
"—" denotes a recording that did not chart or was not released in that territory.

=== As a featured artist ===
List of singles, showing all relevant details
Title	Year	Album
L.A. Street Scene (It's a Jubilee) (featuring Phillip Ingram, Donny Osmond, Scherrie Payne and Freda Payne)	1985	—N/a
The Girl from New York City Tom Jones with Donny Osmond	1997	Tom Jones (Netherlands album)
"Know" (DJ Many featuring Donny Osmond)	2016	—N/a

== Videography ==
List of albums, with other relevant details
Title	Album details	Certifications
This Is the Moment	Released: September 25, 2001; Label: Decca; Formats: VHS	
Live	Released: October 26, 2004; Label: Decca; Formats: DVD	BPI: Platinum
Live at Edinburgh Castle	Released: May 10, 2005; Label: Decca; Formats: DVD	BPI: Gold
One Night Only! Live in Birmingham	Released: July 14, 2017; Label: Gonzo; Formats:DVD	

=== Music videos ===
List of music videos, showing year released and director
Title	Year	Director(s)	Ref.
"Soldier of Love"	1989	Michael Bay	
"Sacred Emotion"	1989	Michael Bay	
"My Love Is a Fire"	1990	Michael Bay	
"Sure Lookin'"	1991	Michael Bay	

== Other album appearances ==
List of non-single guest appearances, with other performing artists, showing year released and album name
Title	Year	Other artist(s)	Album	Ref.
"We Can't Stop the Hurtin'"	1984	Chicago	Chicago 17	
"Stayin' Alive"	1991	Dweezil Zappa	Confessions	
"Magic of Christmas (God Bless Everyone)"	1999	Rosie O'Donnell	A Rosie Christmas	
"Back to Love"	2000	Suzy K.	As I Am	
"Love of My Life"	2000	Jim Brickman	My Romance: An Evening with Jim Brickman	
"The Gift"	2005	Anne Cochran; Jim Brickman; Tracy Silverman	This Is the Season	
"All I Ask of You"	2012	Susan Boyle	Standing Ovation: The Greatest Songs from the Stage	
"This Is the Moment"	2012	Susan Boyle	Standing Ovation: The Greatest Songs from the Stage	

== See also ==
- Donny and Marie Osmond discography
- Marie Osmond discography
- The Osmonds discography
