= My Best to You =

Compilation album by Donny Osmond
- Released: December 9, 1972
- Recorded: November 10, 1970 – April 17, 1972
- Genre: Pop, bubblegum pop, R&B, soul
- Length: 26:57
- Label: MGM Records
- Producer: Rick Hall

Donny Osmond chronology
Too Young (1972)	My Best to You (1972)	Alone Together (1973)

My Best to You is a compilation album by American singer Donny Osmond. It contains his hit songs from his first four albums: The Donny Osmond Album, To You with Love, Donny, Portrait of Donny, and Too Young. The album reached number 29 on the Billboard Top LPs chart on February 3, 1973. It was certified Gold by the RIAA on September 14, 1973.

== Track listing ==
Side A
No.	Title	Writer(s)	Length
1.	"Sweet and Innocent"	Billy Sherrill, Rick Hall	2:49
2.	"Go Away Little Girl"	Carole King, Gerry Goffin	2:42
3.	"I'm Your Puppet"	Dan Penn, Spooner Oldham	2:48
4.	"Hey Girl"	King, Goffin	3:13
5.	"I Knew You When"	Joe South	2:48

Side B
No.	Title	Writer(s)	Length
1.	"Puppy Love"	Paul Anka	3:05
2.	"Too Young"	Sidney Lippman, Sylvia Dee	2:58
3.	"Why"	Peter De Angelis, Bob Marcucci	2:45
4.	"Lonely Boy"	Anka	2:54
5.	"We Can Make It Together (Do You Want Me?)"	Alan Osmond, Merrill Osmond, Wayne Osmond	2:40

== Certifications ==
Region	Certification	Certified units/sales
United States (RIAA)	Gold	500,000^{^}
^{^} Shipments figures based on certification alone.
