= The Osmonds (TV series) =

- Title card
- Written by: Earl Doud; William J. Keenan; Claire Merrill; Romeo Muller; Iris Rainer
- Directed by: Arthur Rankin, Jr. Jules Bass
- Voices of: Paul Frees; Iris Rainer; Alan Osmond; Wayne Osmond; Merrill Osmond; Jay Osmond; Donny Osmond; Jimmy Osmond
- Theme music composer: George Jackson
- Opening theme: "One Bad Apple"
- Ending theme: "One Bad Apple" (reprise)
- Composers: Maury Laws; Alan Osmond; Wayne Osmond; Merrill Osmond
- Countries of origin: United States; United Kingdom
- No. of seasons: 1
- No. of episodes: 17

Production
- Producers: Arthur Rankin, Jr. Jules Bass
- Running time: 30 min.
- Production companies: Rankin/Bass Productions; Halas and Batchelor

Original release
- Network: ABC
- Release: September 9 – December 23, 1972

The Osmonds is a 1972 ABC-TV Saturday morning cartoon series produced by Rankin/Bass Productions starring the Osmond Brothers. Each episode features the family in a different location around the world, with young Jimmy's antics usually driving the plot of the episode. As with most television series oriented around bands, the Osmonds' songs were featured prominently in the series. The series also featured their talking pet dog, Fuji. Marie Osmond did not appear in the series (save for being briefly depicted in "Transylvania,") as she would not make her performing debut until 1973. An abridged version of their hit song "One Bad Apple" was used for the opening and closing credits of the show.

Like Jackson 5ive, it used a laugh track created by Rankin/Bass, but unlike the Jacksons, the Osmond brothers provided their own speaking voices in their series.

== Episodes ==
Each episode features one song by the Osmonds as a group and one solo song by either Donny or Jimmy. Songs are followed by the albums on which they were included. Most of the Osmonds group songs came from their rock-era albums Phase III and Crazy Horses.

No.	Title	Original release date
1	"And Away They Go"	September 9, 1972
The pilot episode introduces the six brothers, their talking pet dog Fuji, and Donny's biggest fan, Hortense Bird. The brothers have a chance to audition to go around the world, but Jimmy and Fuji ruin their chances. Songs: "One Bad Apple" (Osmonds), "Go Away Little Girl" (Donny solo, To You With Love, Donny)
2	"China"	September 16, 1972
The brothers arrive in China and there are bad vibes between Jimmy and Fuji. The brothers play a ping pong game for America vs. China. Songs: "Don't Panic" (Phase III), "Sweet and Innocent" (Osmonds and The Donny Osmond Album)
3	"Jimmy and James in London"	September 23, 1972
The brothers visit London and Jimmy is mistaken for a prince who looks exactly like him. Songs: "In the Rest of My Life" (Phase III), "Why" (Donny solo, Too Young)
4	"Sir Donald of Bavaria"	September 30, 1972
The brothers arrive at a museum in Bavaria, and Donny dreams that he, Jimmy and Fuji are sent back to medieval times. Songs: "Do You Want Me (We Can Make it Together)" (Donny solo, To You With Love, Donny), "Business" (Phase III)
5	"Paris"	October 7, 1972
The brothers are in Paris and they must save a restaurant from going out of business. Songs: "Promise Me" (Donny solo, Portrait Of Donny), "Shuckin' and Jivin'" (Homemade)
6	"Monte Carlo"	October 14, 1972
The brothers are in Monte Carlo and Jimmy makes a very popular film. Donny falls for the wrong girl. Songs: "Wake Up Little Susie" (Donny solo, The Donny Osmond Album), "Getcha Goin' My Way" (unreleased until 2012) Note: The Osmonds' single, "Crazy Horses", and their album of the same name, were released on this date.
7	"Denmark"	October 21, 1972
The brothers arrive in Denmark and Jimmy travels underwater with a mermaid. Songs: "Love Me" (Donny solo, Portrait Of Donny), "Hold Her Tight" (Crazy Horses)
8	"India"	October 28, 1972
The brothers arrive in India and Jimmy makes friends with a genie. Songs: "And You Love Me" (Crazy Horses), "Hey Girl" (Donny solo, Portrait Of Donny)
9	"The Yukon"	November 4, 1972
Jimmy accidentally books the brothers to go to the Yukon. Songs: "All I Have to Do Is Dream" (Donny solo, Portrait Of Donny), "My Drum" (Phase III)
10	"The Black Forest"	November 11, 1972
The brothers have to fix a clock or a whole town will be put to sleep forever. Songs: "Going Going Gone (To Somebody Else)" (Donny solo, Portrait Of Donny), "Girl" (Crazy Horses)
11	"Italy"	November 18, 1972
Jimmy finds a valuable coin and a girl tries to get it from him by going on a date with Donny. Songs: "What Could It Be" (Crazy Horses), "This Guy's in Love with You" (Donny solo, Portrait Of Donny)
12	"Australia"	November 23, 1972
The Osmonds visit Australia, where a kangaroo falls in love with Jimmy. Songs: "It's You Babe" (Phase III), "Lonely Boy" (Donny solo, Too Young)
13	"Transylvania"	November 25, 1972
The Osmonds are invited to a vampire's party. Songs: "Killer Joe" (Jimmy solo, Killer Joe), "We All Fall Down" (Crazy Horses)
14	"Rio"	December 2, 1972
The brothers visit Rio and Jimmy gets lost at a costume contest. Songs: "Pretty Blue Eyes" (Donny solo, Too Young), "Hey Mr. Taxi" (Crazy Horses)
15	"Don Osmondo in Spain"	December 9, 1972
The brothers arrive in Spain and Donny becomes a bullfighter to impress a girl. Songs: "Puppy Love" (Donny solo, Portrait Of Donny), "Yo-Yo" (Phase III) Note: This episode aired on Donny Osmond's 15th birthday.
16	"Luck of The Osmonds"	December 16, 1972
The brothers arrive in Ireland and Jimmy is mistaken for a leprechaun. Songs: "Down by the Lazy River" (Phase III), "Long Haired Lover from Liverpool" (Jimmy solo, Killer Joe) Note: This episode's air date coincided with Jimmy's "Long Haired Lover from Liverpool" reaching "Christmas number one" in the United Kingdom.
17	"Coming Home to Utah"	December 23, 1972
After 15 weeks (or in this case, episodes) of touring around the world, the Osmonds return to their home state of Utah. Songs: "Utah" (Crazy Horses), "Too Young" (Donny solo, Too Young) Note: Rankin/Bass planned a live-action finale featuring the real Osmonds, who would discuss all their adventures touring the world during the series, and the many friends they made along the way. They would also thank the viewers for supporting their travels, and also hope to tour the world again, only this time, for real. However, the finale did not materialise.
