= List of UK top-ten albums in 1973 =

The UK Albums Chart is one of many music charts compiled by the Official Charts Company that calculates the best-selling albums of the week in the United Kingdom. Before 2004, the chart was only based on the sales of physical albums. This list shows albums that peaked in the Top 10 of the UK Albums Chart during 1973, as well as albums which peaked in 1972 and 1974 but were in the top 10 in 1973. The entry date is when the album appeared in the top ten for the first time (week ending, as published by the Official Charts Company, which is six days after the chart is announced).

The first new number-one album of the year was by Slayed? by Slade. Overall, twenty different albums peaked at number one in 1973, with David Bowie, Elton John, Slade and Various artists (2) having the joint most albums hit that position.

== Top-ten albums ==
Key

Symbol	Meaning
‡	Album peaked in 1970 or 1972 but still in chart in 1973.
♦	Album released in 1973 but peaked in 1974.
Entered	The date that the album first appeared in the chart.
Peak	Highest position that the album reached in the UK Albums Chart.

Entered (week ending)	Weeks in top 10	Single	Artist	Peak	Peak reached (week ending)	Weeks at peak
Albums in 1970
21 February 1970	135	Bridge Over Troubled Water ‡	Simon & Garfunkel	1	21 February 1970	33
Albums in 1972
8 July 1972	20	The Rise and Fall of Ziggy Stardust and the Spiders from Mars	David Bowie	5	10 February 1973	1
22 July 1972	59	Simon and Garfunkel's Greatest Hits ‡	Simon & Garfunkel	2	29 July 1972	3
5 August 1972	20	Never a Dull Moment ‡	Rod Stewart	1	16 September 1972	2
7 October 1972	15	20 All Time Greats of the 50s ‡	Various artists	1	7 October 1972	11
7 October 1972	10	Catch Bull at Four ‡	Cat Stevens	2	14 October 1972	2
18 November 1972	22	Back to Front	Gilbert O'Sullivan	1	20 January 1973	1
25 November 1972	9	22 Dynamic Hits Vol. 2 ‡	Various artists	2	23 December 1972	2
25 November 1972	10	20 Fantastic Hits Vol. 2 ‡	Various artists	2	9 December 1972	3
2 December 1972	15	25 Rockin' and Rollin' Greats ‡	Various artists	1	2 December 1972	11
2 December 1972	11	Portrait of Donny	Donny Osmond	5	20 January 1973	1
9 December 1972	16	Slayed?	Slade	1	13 January 1973	3
23 December 1972	8	Too Young ‡	Donny Osmond	7	23 December 1972	5
Albums in 1973
6 January 1973	4	Crazy Horses	The Osmonds	9	13 January 1973	2
27 January 1973	7	The Strauss Family	Cyril Ornadel and the London Symphony Orchestra	2	10 February 1973	2
27 January 1973	4	No Secrets	Carly Simon	3	3 February 1973	2
10 February 1973	11	Don't Shoot Me I'm Only the Piano Player	Elton John	1	10 February 1973	6
10 February 1973	2	Heartbreaker	Free	9	10 February 1973	2
17 February 1973	2	Piledriver	Status Quo	5	17 February 1973	1
17 February 1973	6	Focus II (Moving Waves)	Focus	2	17 March 1973	1
24 February 1973	8	Rock Me Baby	David Cassidy	2	24 February 1973	1
24 February 1973	2	Who Do We Think We Are	Deep Purple	4	24 February 1973	1
24 February 1973	5	Focus III	Focus	6	10 March 1973	1
3 March 1973	5	Bursting at the Seams	Strawbs	2	3 March 1973	2
3 March 1973	2	The Six Wives of Henry VIII	Rick Wakeman	7	3 March 1973	1
10 March 1973	5	A Clockwork Orange	Wendy Carlos	4	24 March 1973	1
24 March 1973	9	Billion Dollar Babies	Alice Cooper	1	24 March 1973	1
31 March 1973	6	20 Flash Back Greats of the Sixties	Various artists	1	31 March 1973	2
31 March 1973	42	The Dark Side of the Moon	Pink Floyd	2	31 March 1973	1
31 March 1973	4	Tanx	T. Rex	4	31 March 1973	2
7 April 1973	7	20 Fantastic Hits from the 50s and 60s	Various artists	2	7 April 1973	2
7 April 1973	6	For Your Pleasure	Roxy Music	4	14 April 1973	1
14 April 1973	5	Houses of the Holy	Led Zeppelin	1	14 April 1973	2
14 April 1973	1	Together	Jack Jones	8	14 April 1973	1
21 April 1973	4	Ooh La La	Faces	1	28 April 1973	1
28 April 1973	4	Believe in Music	Various artists	2	28 April 1973	2
5 May 1973	27	Aladdin Sane	David Bowie	1	5 May 1973	5
5 May 1973	17	1967-1970	The Beatles	2	12 May 1973	3
5 May 1973	14	1962-1966	The Beatles	3	12 May 1973	3
19 May 1973	1	SingalongaMax Vol. 3	Max Bygraves	5	19 May 1973	1
19 May 1973	6	Red Rose Speedway	Paul McCartney & Wings	5	26 May 1973	1
26 May 1973	4	20 Fantastic Hits Vol. 3	Various artists	3	26 May 1973	2
26 May 1973	2	Daltrey	Roger Daltrey	6	26 May 1973	1
26 May 1973	1	Yessongs	Yes	7	26 May 1973	1
26 May 1973	4	Alone Together	Donny Osmond	6	26 May 1973	1
26 May 1973	2	Liza with a Z	Liza Minnelli	9	26 May 1973	1
2 June 1973	5	Pure Gold	Various artists	1	9 June 1973	3
2 June 1973	1	Never Never Never	Shirley Bassey	10	2 June 1973	1
9 June 1973	7	There Goes Rhymin' Simon	Paul Simon	4	30 June 1973	1
9 June 1973	1	Space Ritual	Hawkwind	9	9 June 1973	1
16 June 1973	6	Touch Me	Gary Glitter	2	16 June 1973	1
16 June 1973	3	20 Original Chart Hits	Various artists	9	23 June 1973	2
23 June 1973	8	That'll Be the Day	Various artists	1	30 June 1973	7
30 June 1973	15	We Can Make It	Peters and Lee	1	18 August 1973	2
7 July 1973	5	Living in the Material World	George Harrison	2	7 July 1973	1
7 July 1973	44	And I Love You So ♦	Perry Como	1	26 January 1974	1
21 July 1973	22	Now & Then	The Carpenters	2	15 September 1973	1
21 July 1973	6	Foreigner	Cat Stevens	3	28 July 1973	1
28 July 1973	2	Love Devotion Surrender	Carlos Santana and John McLaughlin	7	28 July 1973	1
4 August 1973	12	Hunky Dory	David Bowie	3	18 August 1973	2
18 August 1973	1	Genesis Live	Genesis	9	18 August 1973	1
25 August 1973	9	Sing It Again Rod	Rod Stewart	1	1 September 1973	3
25 August 1973	5	The Plan	The Osmonds	6	1 September 1973	2
1 September 1973	74	Tubular Bells ♦	Mike Oldfield	1	5 October 1974	1
8 September 1973	4	Touch Me in the Morning	Diana Ross	7	22 September 1973	1
8 September 1973	4	Innervisions ♦	Stevie Wonder	8	27 April 1974	1
22 September 1973	6	Goats Head Soup	The Rolling Stones	1	22 September 1973	2
22 September 1973	2	Mott	Mott the Hoople	7	29 September 1973	1
6 October 1973	13	Sladest	Slade	1	6 October 1973	4
6 October 1973	9	Hello!	Status Quo	1	27 October 1973	1
6 October 1973	3	SingalongaMax Vol. 4	Max Bygraves	7	6 October 1973	1
13 October 1973	16	I'm a Writer, Not a Fighter	Gilbert O'Sullivan	2	20 October 1973	2
20 October 1973	4	Selling England by the Pound	Genesis	3	20 October 1973	1
27 October 1973	1	Berlin	Lou Reed	7	27 October 1973	1
3 November 1973	13	Pin Ups	David Bowie	1	3 November 1973	5
3 November 1973	25	Goodbye Yellow Brick Road	Elton John	1	22 December 1973	2
3 November 1973	4	These Foolish Things	Bryan Ferry	5	3 November 1973	1
3 November 1973	3	Motown Chartbusters Vol. 8	Various artists	9	3 November 1973	3
17 November 1973	5	Quadrophenia	The Who	2	17 November 1973	2
1 December 1973	7	Dreams Are Nuthin' More Than Wishes	David Cassidy	1	15 December 1973	1
1 December 1973	8	Stranded	Roxy Music	1	8 December 1973	1
8 December 1973	2	Sabbath Bloody Sabbath	Black Sabbath	4	8 December 1973	2
8 December 1973	4	Rock On	David Essex	7	8 December 1973	1
8 December 1973	2	Ringo	Ringo Starr	7	22 December 1973	1
8 December 1973	1	Loud 'n' Proud	Nazareth	10	8 December 1973	1
15 December 1973	1	Music For A Royal Wedding	Various artists	7	15 December 1973	1
15 December 1973	1	Welcome	Santana	8	15 December 1973	1
22 December 1973	5	A Time for Us ♦	Donny Osmond	4	5 January 1974	1
22 December 1973	49	Band on the Run ♦	Paul McCartney & Wings	1	27 July 1974	7
22 December 1973	5	Tales from Topographic Oceans ♦	Yes	1	5 January 1974	2

== See also ==
- 1973 in British music
- List of number-one albums from the 1970s (UK)
