= Eydie =

Eydie may refer to:

- Eydie Gormé (1928–2013), American singer.
- Steve and Eydie, an American pop vocal duet,
- Eydie Whittington, a Democratic politician in Washington, D.C.
- The World Of Steve & Eydie, a 1972 album released by Steve Lawrence and Eydie Gorme.
- Eydie in Love, a 1958 album by Eydie Gormé.
