= Pretty Blue Eyes =

Single by Steve Lawrence
- B-side: "You're Nearer"
- Released: 1959
- Genre: Pop
- Length: 1:52
- Label: ABC-Paramount
- Songwriters: Teddy Randazzo & Bobby Weinstein
- Producer: Don Costa

Steve Lawrence singles chronology
"Only One Love" (1959)	"Pretty Blue Eyes" (1959)	"Footsteps" (1960)

"Pretty Blue Eyes" is a song written by Teddy Randazzo and Bobby Weinstein. In 1959, it was a hit single for Steve Lawrence, and in 1960 for Craig Douglas.

== Steve Lawrence version ==
In 1959, Steve Lawrence released the song as a single. Lawrence's version spent 18 weeks on the Billboard Hot 100 chart, peaking at No. 9, while reaching No. 7 on the Cash Box Top 100, No. 4 on Canada's CHUM Hit Parade, and No. 7 in Australia.

=== Chart performance ===
Chart (1959–1960)	Peak position
Australia	7
Canada (CHUM Hit Parade)	4
US Billboard Hot 100	9
US Cash Box Top 100	7
US Cash Box Records Disc Jockeys Played Most	5
US Cash Box Top Ten Juke Box Tunes	6

== Cover versions ==
- In 1960, Craig Douglas released a cover of the song, which reached No. 4 on the UK's New Musical Express chart and No. 12 in Italy. The song also reached No. 20 in the Netherlands in 1960, in a tandem ranking of Steve Lawrence and Craig Douglas's versions.
- In 1964, Teddy Randazzo released a version of the song as the B-side of "Doo Dah".
- In 1967, The Guess Who released a version of the song, which reached No. 48 on Canada's RPM 100.
- Donny Osmond released a version of the song on his 1972 album Too Young.
