= We Can Make It Together =

1972 song performed by Steve and Eydie

"Do You Want Me (We Can Make It Together)"

Song by Donny Osmond

from the album To You with Love, Donny
- Released: October 11, 1971
- Recorded: September 24, 1971
- Genre: Pop
- Length: 2:42
- Label: MGM
- Songwriters: Alan Osmond, Merrill Osmond, Wayne Osmond
- Producers: Alan Osmond, Michael Lloyd

"We Can Make it Together"

Single by Steve and Eydie

from the album The World Of Steve & Eydie
- B-side: "E Fini"
- Released: September 1972
- Genre: Pop
- Length: 3:15
- Label: MGM
- Songwriters: Alan Osmond, Merrill Osmond, Wayne Osmond
- Producers: Don Costa, Mike Curb

Steve and Eydie singles chronology
"Love is Blue/Autumn Leaves" (1971)	"We Can Make it Together" (1972)

"We Can Make it Together" is a song written by Alan Osmond, Merrill Osmond, and Wayne Osmond and performed by Steve and Eydie featuring The Osmonds.

The song was originally performed by Donny Osmond and was titled "Do You Want Me (We Can Make It Together)", and appeared on the 1971 album To You with Love, Donny.

It was renamed "We Can Make It Together" and the Steve & Eydie version was featured on their 1972 album, The World Of Steve & Eydie. Their version reached #7 on the U.S. adult contemporary chart, #21 on Canadian adult contemporary chart, #60 on the Canadian pop chart, and #68 on the Billboard chart in 1972. Their version was produced by Don Costa and Mike Curb and arranged by Costa.

After the song became a hit in late 1972, Osmond's version was also included on a second LP, My Best to You. The song was again retitled, "We Can Make It Together (Do You Want Me?)" to distinguish it from a different song by Osmond with a very similar title, "Do You Want Me" on his subsequent 1973 LP, Alone Together.
