= Billboard year-end top 30 singles of 1951 =

Ranking of recorded music

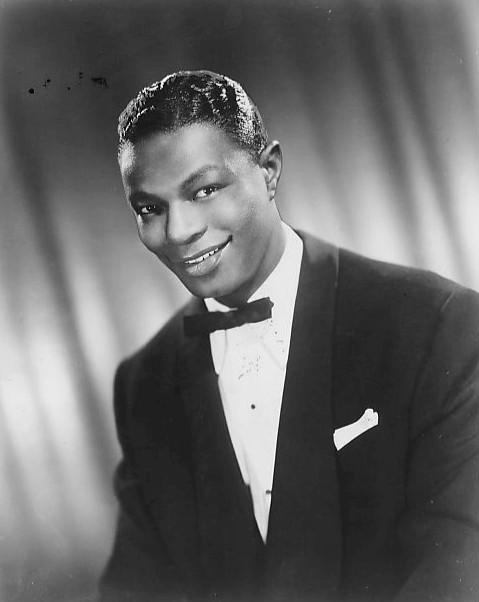
"Too Young" by Nat King Cole (pictured) with Les Baxter was the number one song of 1951.

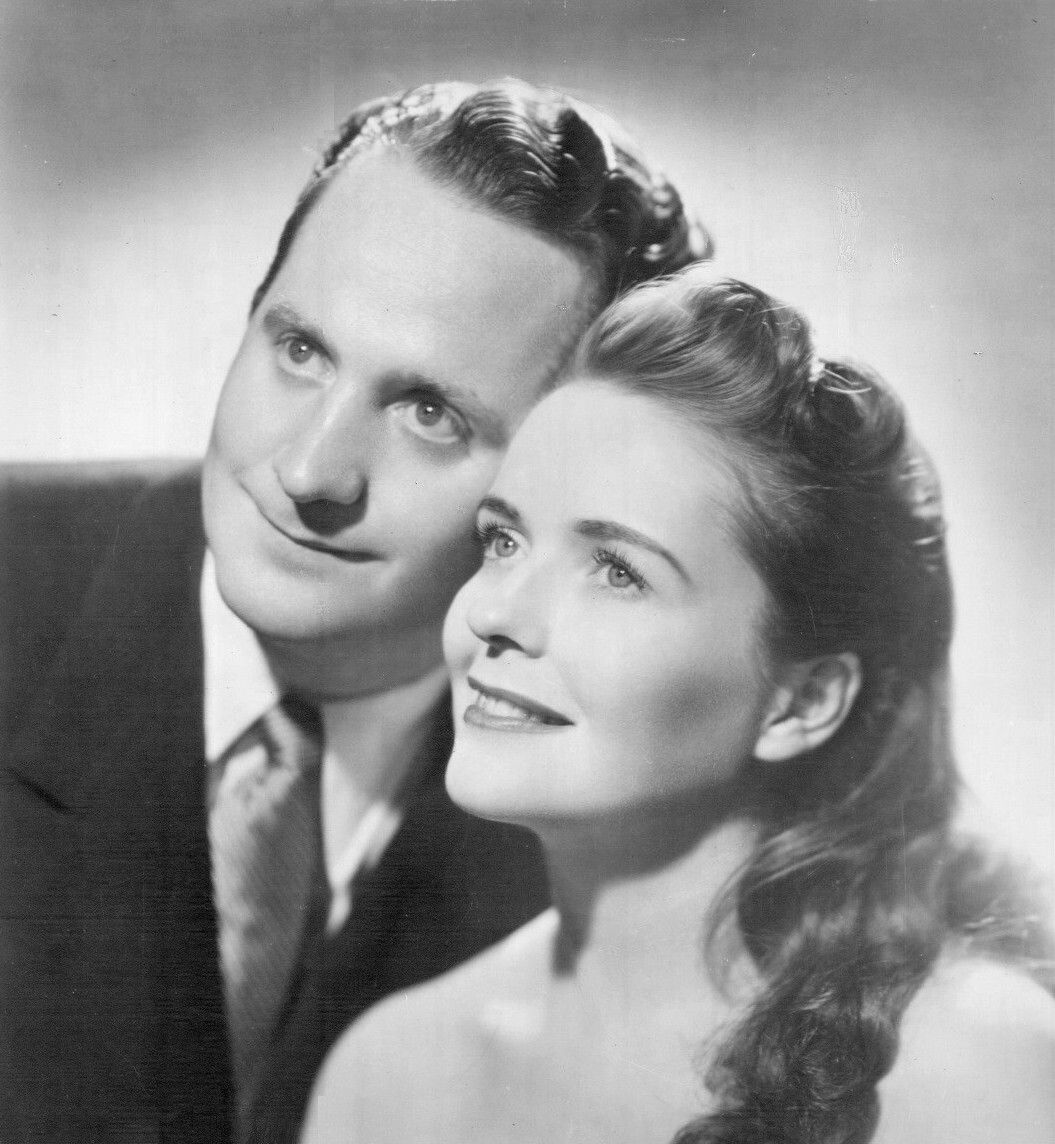
Les Paul and Mary Ford had three songs on the year-end top 30.

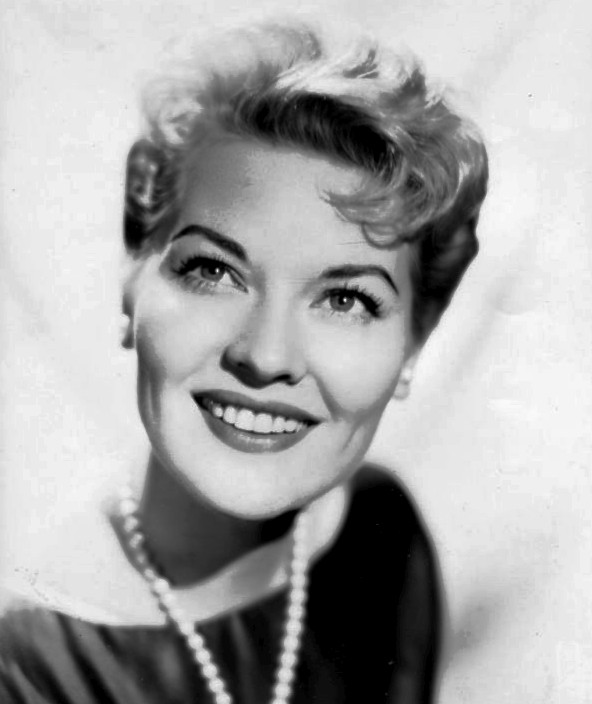
Patti Page had three songs on the year-end top 30.

This is a list of Billboard magazine's top popular songs of 1951 by retail sales.

| No. | Title | Artist(s) |
|---|---|---|
| 1 | "Too Young" | Nat King Cole with Les Baxter |
| 2 | "Because of You" | Tony Bennett with Percy Faith |
| 3 | "How High the Moon" | Les Paul and Mary Ford |
| 4 | "Come On-a My House" | Rosemary Clooney |
| 5 | "Be My Love" | Mario Lanza with Ray Sinatra and Jeff Alexander |
| 6 | "On Top of Old Smoky" | The Weavers and Terry Gilkyson with Vic Schoen |
| 7 | "Cold, Cold Heart" | Tony Bennett with Percy Faith |
| 8 | "If" | Perry Como with Mitchell Ayres |
| 9 | "The Loveliest Night of the Year" | Mario Lanza |
| 10 | "Tennessee Waltz" | Patti Page |
| 11 | "Jezebel" | Frankie Laine with The Norman Luboff Choir and Mitch Miller |
| 12 | "I Get Ideas" | Tony Martin with Henri René |
| 13 | "Mockin' Bird Hill" | Les Paul and Mary Ford |
| 14 | "Mockin' Bird Hill" | Patti Page |
| 15 | "My Heart Cries for You" | Guy Mitchell & Mitch Miller |
| 16 | "(It's No) Sin" | Eddy Howard |
| 17 | "Sound Off" | Vaughn Monroe |
| 18 | "Sweet Violets" | Dinah Shore with Henri René |
| 19 | "The World Is Waiting for the Sunrise" | Les Paul and Mary Ford |
| 20 | "My Truly, Truly Fair" | Guy Mitchell & Mitch Miller |
| 21 | "(It's No) Sin" | The Four Aces |
| 22 | "Aba Daba Honeymoon" | Debbie Reynolds & Carleton Carpenter with Georgie Stoll |
| 23 | "Rose, Rose, I Love You" | Frankie Laine and The Norman Luboff Choir with Paul Weston |
| 24 | "Down Yonder" | Del Wood |
| 25 | "I Apologize" | Billy Eckstine |
| 26 | "Would I Love You (Love You, Love You)" | Patti Page |
| 27 | "You're Just in Love" | Perry Como & The Fontane Sisters with Mitchell Ayres |
| 28 | "Undecided" | Ames Brothers with The Les Brown Orchestra |
| 29 | "The Thing" | Phil Harris with Walter Scharf |
| 30 | "Because of You" | Les Baxter |

== See also ==
- 1951 in music
- List of Billboard number-one singles of 1951
