= My Love Is a Fire =

Single by Donny Osmond
- Released: 1990
- Length: 3:56
- Label: Capitol
- Songwriters: Carl Sturken; Evan Rogers

Donny Osmond singles chronology
"Sacred Emotion" (1989)	"My Love Is a Fire" (1990)	"Any Dream Will Do" (1992)

Music video
- "My Love Is A Fire" on YouTube

"My Love Is A Fire" is a song written by Carl Sturken and Evan Rogers and performed by American singer, dancer, actor, television host and former teen idol Donny Osmond. It was released by Capitol Records as the first single from his eleventh solo studio album, Eyes Don't Lie (1990). The single reached numbers 21 and 25 on the US Billboard Hot 100 and Cash Box Top 100 in 1990. The accompanying music video was directed by Michael Bay.

== Charts ==
Chart (1990–1991)	Peak position
Canada Top Singles (RPM)	27
UK Singles (OCC)	64
UK Airplay (Music Week)	37
US Billboard Hot 100	21
US Cash Box Top 100	25
