= The World of Steve & Eydie =

Studio album by Steve and Eydie
- Released: 1972
- Genre: Pop
- Label: MGM Records
- Producer: Don Costa, Mike Curb

Steve and Eydie chronology
A Man and A Woman (1971)	The World of Steve & Eydie (1972)	Feelin (1973)

Singles from The World of Steve & Eydie
- 1. "Lead Me On" Released: December 1971; 2. "We Can Make it Together (featuring The Osmonds)" Released: August 1972

The World of Steve & Eydie is a 1972 album released by Steve Lawrence and Eydie Gorme where they sing songs in multiple languages.

According to Eydie Gorme, the concept for the album was suggested by MGM Records President Mike Curb. Curb came up with the album title and said they should sing "hit songs from other countries". The album was produced and arranged by Don Costa and a tutor was hired for each of the languages in which they sang.

The album produced two singles: "Lead Me On", written by Ernie Shelton and Jack Keller, and "We Can Make it Together" (featuring The Osmonds). On the Billboard Hot 100 Chart, "We Can Make it Together" peaked at #68.

== Track listing ==
=== Side one ===
1. E Fini (Italy)
2. Shiretoko (Japan)
3. Rose D'Irlande (It Was A Good Time) (France)
4. Un Poquito Mas (Mexico)
5. Shall We Dance (Greece)

=== Side two ===
1. Bashana Habana (Israel)
2. Du Sollst Nicht Weinen (Germany)
3. Lead Me On (England)
4. We Can Make It Together (featuring The Osmonds) (U.S.A.)
5. Tristeza (Portugal)

== CD release ==
The album was released on compact disc in 2009. The CD includes the song "Where Can I Go" (U.S.A.), which was not on the original LP track list.
