= Breeze On By =

2004 song by Donny Osmond

Single by Donny Osmond

from the album What I Meant to Say
- Released: December 2004
- Genre: Smooth jazz; pop
- Label: Universal
- Songwriter(s): Donny Osmond, Eliot Kennedy, Gary Barlow, Bobby Womack

Donny Osmond singles chronology
"Love Will Survive" (1991)	"Breeze On By" (2004)

"Breeze On By" is a smooth jazz pop song co-written and performed by Donny Osmond, influenced by George Benson's '70s hit "Breezin'". It is from the December 2004 Donny Osmond album What I Meant to Say. The single reached #37 in Billboard Adult Contemporary chart in 2005 and No.8 in the UK singles chart in October 2004 - Osmond's first British Top Ten hit in thirty years.

Lyrical songwriters include Donny Osmond, Eliot Kennedy, Gary Barlow, and Bobby Womack.
