= The Soundtrack of My Life =

Studio album by Donny Osmond
- Released: November 10, 2014 (UK); January 13, 2015 (USA)
- Recorded: 2014
- Genre: Soul, pop
- Length: 45:54
- Label: Decca
- Producer: Eliot Kennedy, James Jayawardena

Donny Osmond chronology
Love Songs of the 70s (2007)	The Soundtrack of My Life (2014)

The Soundtrack of My Life is the 18th studio album by American singer Donny Osmond, released in 2014. It contains his versions of popular songs from his youth, like "Ben", "My Cherie Amour", and "Baby Love". The album peaked at No. 181 on the Billboard 200 chart and No. 17 on the UK Albums Chart. It featured Stevie Wonder and Laura Wright.

== Track listing ==
No.	Title	Length
1.	"My Cherie Amour"	3:08
2.	"Ben"	2:54
3.	"Peg"	3:47
4.	"The Gift Of Love"	2:52
5.	"Could She Be Mine"	3:20
6.	"I've Got You Under My Skin"	4:33
7.	"Baby Love"	3:31
8.	"Moon River"	3:51
9.	"Your Song"	4:02
10.	"The Long and Winding Road"	3:46
11.	"Don't Give Up"	5:43
12.	"Survivor"	4:27

== Charts ==
Chart (2015)	Peak position
UK Albums Chart	17
US Billboard 200	181
