= A Time for Us (Donny Osmond album) =

Studio album by Donny Osmond
- Released: November 1973
- Genre: Pop, R&B
- Length: 30:48
- Label: MGM
- Producer: Mike Curb, Don Costa

Donny Osmond chronology
Alone Together (1973)	A Time for Us (1973)	Donny (1974)

A Time for Us is the sixth studio album by Donny Osmond, released in 1973. The album reached No. 58 on the Billboard Top LPs chart on January 19, 1974. It was certified Gold in the U.K. on January 1, 1974.

== Track listing ==
No.	Title	Writer(s)	Length
1.	"A Time For Us"	Nino Rota, Larry Kusik, Eddie Snyder	3:53
2.	"Hawaiian Wedding Song"	Charles E. King, Al Hoffman, Dick Manning	2:28
3.	"When I Fall in Love"	Victor Young, Edward Heyman	3:00
4.	"Are You Lonesome Tonight"	Lou Handman, Roy Turk	3:12
5.	"I Believe"	Ervin Drake, Irvin Graham, Jimmy Shirl, Al Stillman	2:55
6.	"Guess Who"	Jesse Belvin	3:06
7.	"Young And In Love"	Dick St. John	2:35
8.	"A Million to One"	Phil Medley	2:42
9.	"A Boy Is Waiting"	Bobby Caldwell, Don Costa	2:37
10.	"Unchained Melody"	Alex North, Hy Zaret	4:20

== Singles ==
- Are You Lonesome Tonight / When I Fall in Love (No. 14 U.S. Hot 100)
- A Time For Us

== Charts ==
Chart (1973/74)	Position
United States (Billboard 200)	58
Australia (Kent Music Report)	64
Canada	65
United Kingdom (Official Charts Company)	4

== Certifications and sales ==
Region	Certification	Certified units/sales
United Kingdom (BPI)	Gold	100,000^{^}
^{^} Shipments figures based on certification alone.
