= Eyes Don't Lie =

Studio album by Donny Osmond
- Released: October 30, 1990
- Genre: Rock, pop
- Length: 46:53
- Label: Capitol
- Producer: Carl Sturken, Evan Rogers, David Gamson, Ric Wake, Donny Osmond

Donny Osmond chronology
Donny Osmond (1989)	Eyes Don't Lie (1990)	This Is the Moment (2001)

Professional ratings
Review scores
Source	Rating
Allmusic	3/5 stars

Eyes Don't Lie is Donny Osmond's eleventh solo studio album. Released on October 30, 1990, on the Capitol label, it peaked at 177 on the Billboard 200 album chart.

The album featured three singles, two of which made Billboard's Hot 100 chart: "My Love Is A Fire" rising to number 21, and "Sure Lookin'" that reached number 54. The last single "Love Will Survive" peaked at number 24 on the Billboard Adult Contemporary Chart.

== Track listing ==
1. "My Love Is a Fire" (Carl Sturken, Evan Rogers) – 4:28
2. "Eyes Don't Lie" (Donny Osmond, Carl Sturken, Evan Rogers) – 4:24
3. "Love Will Survive" (Donny Osmond, Carl Sturken, Evan Rogers) – 5:27
4. "Sure Lookin'" (Donny Osmond, David Gamson, Tony LeMans) – 4:22
5. "Private Affair" (Diane Warren) – 3:49
6. "Take Another Try (At Love)" (Donny Osmond, David Gamson, Tony LeMans) – 4:27
7. "Make It Last Forever" (Donny Osmond, Mark Holding, Mark Mancina) – 5:25
8. "Never Too Late For Love" (Donny Osmond, Carl Sturken, Evan Rogers) – 5:26
9. "Just Between You and Me" (Donny Osmond, Duane Hitchings, Alan Hewitt) – 3:46
10. "Before It's Too Late" (Donny Osmond, Oliver Leiber, David Gamson) – 5:18

== Production and personnel ==
- Tracks 1–3 and 8 produced by Carl Sturken and Evan Rogers. Track 1 engineered by Al Hemburger and Matt Noble; Tracks 2, 3 and 8 engineered by Al Hemburger, Matt Noble and Acar Key. Engineering assistance on all tracks by Ed Murphy. Mixed by Steve Peck of Electric Lady Studios.
  - All instruments on tracks 1 and 8 by Carl Sturken.
  - Musicians on tracks 2 and 3: Carl Sturken: guitars, keyboards; John "Noodle" Nevin: bass; Dave Koz: saxophone on track 3
- Tracks 4, 6, 7 and 10 produced by David Gamson. Tracks 4 and 6 engineered by Stephen Shelton, Ryan Dorn and Ray Bardani. Tracks 7 and 10 engineered by Ryan Dorn and Ray Bardani. Mixed by Ray Bardani and Ryan Dorn.
  - David Gamson: keyboards and drum programming; Paul Jackson, Jr.: Guitars (tracks 7 and 10); Paulinho da Costa: percussion (track 10); Cornelius Mims: bass (track 6); Oliver Leiber: additional drum programming (track 10); Michael Brecker: saxophone (track 6); DJ Aladdin: scratching (track 6)
- Track 5 produced by Ric Wake; arranged by Ric Wake and Rich Tancredi. Engineered and mixed by Bob Cadway, with assistance from Dan Hetzel and Tom Yezzi.
  - Rich Tancredi: Keyboards; Joe Franco: Drums, Percussion; Billy T. Scott, Jamillah Muhammed and Shelly Peiken: Vocal Backing
- Track 9 arranged and produced by Ric Wake and Donny Osmond. Engineered and mixed by Bob Cadway and Ryan Dorn.
  - Joe Franco: drums, percussion; Rich Tancredi: keyboards; Al Pitrelli: rhythm guitar; Rory James Collen: lead guitar
- Strings on track 10 arranged and conducted by Jeremy Lubbock; contracted by Jules Chalkin.
  - Violin: Bruce Dukov, Debra Price, Arnold Belnick, Isabelle Daskoff, Joel Derouin, Henry Ferber, Reg Hill, Brian Leonard, Gordon Marron, Don Palmer, Haim Shtrum, Bob Sushel, Mari Tsumura, Shari Zippert
  - Viola: Sam Boghossian, Ken Burward-Hoy, Myra Kestenbaum, Dan Neufeld
  - Cello: Fred Seykora, Ron Cooper, Larry Corbett, Ernie Ehrhradt, Dennis Karmazyn, Suzie Katayama
- Album mastered by Stephen Marcussen at Precision Lacquer, Los Angeles

== Reception ==
Charlotte Dillon of Allmusic gave the album 3 stars out of a possible 5, writing that the album was "worth a listen" due Osmond's vocal talents.
