= Too Young (album) =

Studio album by Donny Osmond
- Released: July 15, 1972
- Genre: Pop, bubblegum pop, R&B
- Length: 26:13
- Label: MGM
- Producer: Mike Curb, Don Costa, Alan Osmond, Michael Lloyd, Rick Hall

Donny Osmond chronology
Portrait of Donny (1972)	Too Young (1972)	My Best to You (1972)

Singles from Too Young
- 1. "Too Young" Released: June 10, 1972; 2. "Why" Released: August 12, 1972

Too Young is the fourth studio album by American singer Donny Osmond, released in 1972. It reached number 11 on the Billboard Top LPs chart on September 23, 1972. The singles, "Too Young" and "Why", both reached No. 13 on the Billboard Hot 100. It was certified Gold by the RIAA on January 24, 1973.

== Track listing ==
No.	Title	Writer(s)	Length
1.	"Donna"	Ritchie Valens	2:38
2.	"Too Young"	Sidney Lippman, Sylvia Dee	2:58
3.	"Pretty Blue Eyes"	Teddy Randazzo, Bobby Weinstein	2:06
4.	"To Run Away"	Alan Osmond, Merrill Osmond	2:20
5.	"A Teenager in Love"	Doc Pomus, Mort Shuman	2:25
6.	"Lonely Boy"	Paul Anka	2:54
7.	"Why"	Peter De Angelis, Bob Marcucci	2:45
8.	"Run to Him"	Jack Keller, Gerry Goffin	2:25
9.	"Take Good Care of My Baby"	Carole King, Gerry Goffin	3:17
10.	"Last of the Red Hot Lovers"	Alan Osmond, Mack David, Mike Curb	2:19

== Charts ==
Chart (1972/73)	Position
United States (Billboard 200)	11
Australia (Kent Music Report)	30
Canada	12
United Kingdom (Official Charts Company)	7

== Certifications ==
Region	Certification	Certified units/sales
United States (RIAA)	Gold	500,000^{^}
^{^} Shipments figures based on certification alone.
