= Portrait of Donny =

Studio album by Donny Osmond
- Released: May 27, 1972
- Genre: Pop, bubblegum pop, R&B
- Length: 32:01
- Label: MGM
- Producer: Rick Hall, Mike Curb, Don Costa, Ray Ruff, Alan Osmond, Michael Lloyd

Donny Osmond chronology
To You With Love, Donny (1971)	Portrait of Donny (1972)	Too Young (1972)

Singles from Portrait of Donny
- 1. "Hey Girl" Released: November 6, 1971; 2. "Puppy Love" Released: February 19, 1972

Portrait of Donny is the third studio album by the American singer Donny Osmond, released in 1972. The album reached number six on the Billboard Top LPs chart on July 22, 1972. The album had two hit singles. "Puppy Love" reached number three on the Billboard Hot 100, while "Hey Girl" peaked at number nine. The album was certified Gold by the RIAA on December 30, 1972.

== Track listing ==
No.	Title	Writer(s)	Length
1.	"Puppy Love"	Paul Anka	3:05
2.	"Hey Girl"	Carole King, Gerry Goffin	3:13
3.	"Going Going Gone (To Somebody Else)"	Larry Weiss	2:07
4.	"I've Got Plans for You"	Don Costa, Roger Christian, Michael Charles	2:13
5.	"Promise Me"	Alan Osmond, Merrill Osmond, Wayne Osmond	3:31
6.	"Let My People Go"	Helen Lewis, Kay Lewis	3:10
7.	"All I Have to Do Is Dream"	Boudleaux Bryant	3:08
8.	"Hey There Lonely Girl"	Leon Carr, Earl Shuman	3:30
9.	"Big Man"	Glen A. Larson, Bruce Belland	2:36
10.	"Love Me"	Alan Osmond, Merrill Osmond, Michael Lloyd	2:44
11.	"This Guy's in Love with You"	Burt Bacharach, Hal David	2:44

== Charts ==
Chart (1972)	Position
United States (Billboard 200)	6
Australia (Kent Music Report)	55
Canada	5
United Kingdom (Official Charts Company)	5

== Certifications ==
Region	Certification	Certified units/sales
United States (RIAA)	Gold	500,000^{^}
^{^} Shipments figures based on certification alone.
