= The Donny Osmond Album =

Studio album by Donny Osmond
- Released: June 5, 1971
- Recorded: 1970–1971
- Studio: Fame Studios, Muscle Shoals Studios & Independent Records in Studio City, California
- Genre: Teen pop, bubblegum pop
- Length: 27:07
- Label: MGM
- Producer: Rick Hall

Donny Osmond chronology
The Donny Osmond Album (1971)	To You with Love, Donny (1971)

Singles from The Donny Osmond Album
- 1. "Sweet and Innocent" Released: February 27, 1971

Professional ratings
Review scores
Source	Rating
AllMusic	3.5/5 stars

The Donny Osmond Album is the debut album by pop singer Donny Osmond. It was released in 1971 on MGM when Osmond was 13. It was produced by Rick Hall, who was also responsible for most of the arrangements.

The album features one single, the Billy Sherrill-Rick Hall written lead-off track "Sweet & Innocent". That song peaked at number 7 on the US pop charts (subsequently receiving an RIAA gold certification on August 30 of that year), and pushed the album housing it to number 13 in the U.S. (further up to number 2 in Canada). It is also notable for featuring Osmond's cover of The Everly Brothers' hit "Wake Up, Little Susie". The album is RIAA-certified gold (it reached that sales certification on December 13, 1971).

== Track listing ==
1. "Sweet and Innocent"* (Billy Sherrill, Rick Hall) 2:49
2. "I'm Your Puppet" (Dan Penn, Spooner Oldham) 2:48
3. "Hey Little Girl" (Bobby Stevenson, Otis Blackwell) 2:38
4. "Don't Say No" (David Huff) 3:06
5. "So Shy" (Dennis Linde) 2:40
6. "Lollipops, Lace & Lipstick" (Quin Ivy, Rick Hall) 2:59
7. "Flirtin'"* (Kenny Nolan) 2:55
8. "Burning Bridges" (Lalo Schifrin, Mike Curb) 2:39
9. "Time To Ride" (Mack David) 2:05 (The official 8-Track tape lists this song as "The Wild Rover (Time to Ride)").
10. "Wake Up, Little Susie" (Felice Bryant, Boudleaux Bryant) 3:03
- Tracks with an asterisk (*) previously appeared on the Osmonds' album Osmonds.

== Personnel ==
- Donny Osmond: All vocals
- Vocal supervision: Earl Brown
- Strings arranged and conducted by Pete Carpenter
- Horns arranged by Rick Hall and Harrison Calloway, Jr.

== Production ==
- Arranged and produced by Rick Hall
- Engineered by Rick Hall, Jerry Masters and Ron Malo

== Certifications ==
Region	Certification	Certified units/sales
United States (RIAA)	Gold	500,000^{^}
^{^} Shipments figures based on certification alone.
