= To You with Love, Donny =

Studio album by Donny Osmond
- Released: October 11, 1971
- Genres: Pop, bubblegum pop, R&B
- Length: 27:11
- Label: MGM
- Producer: Rick Hall

Donny Osmond chronology
The Donny Osmond Album (1971)	To You with Love, Donny (1971)	Portrait of Donny (1972)

Singles from To You With Love, Donny
- 1. "Go Away Little Girl" Released: July 31, 1971

To You with Love, Donny is the second studio album by American singer Donny Osmond, released in 1971. The album reached number 12 on the Billboard Top LPs chart on November 27, 1971. "Go Away Little Girl" was released as a single and it reached No. 1 on the Billboard Hot 100. The album was certified Gold by the RIAA on January 26, 1972.

== Track listing ==
No.	Title	Writer(s)	Length
1.	"I Knew You When"	Joe South	2:48
2.	"Little Bit"	Barbara Wyrick	2:52
3.	"Go Away Little Girl"	Carole King, Gerry Goffin	2:42
4.	"Hey Little Johnny"	George Jackson, Jimmy Dotson	2:35
5.	"Sit Down, I Think I Love You"	Stephen Stills	3:08
6.	"A Little Bit Me, a Little Bit You"	Neil Diamond	3:03
7.	"Do You Want Me (We Can Make It Together)"	Alan Osmond, Merrill Osmond, Wayne Osmond	2:40
8.	"Bye Bye Love"	Felice Bryant, Boudleaux Bryant	2:26
9.	"I'm into Something Good"	King, Goffin	2:43
10.	"Standing in the Need of Love"	Johnny Cymbal, Peggy Clinger	2:14

== Certifications ==
Region	Certification	Certified units/sales
United States (RIAA)	Gold	500,000^{^}
^{^} Shipments figures based on certification alone.
