= Steve Lawrence =

American singer and actor (1935–2024)

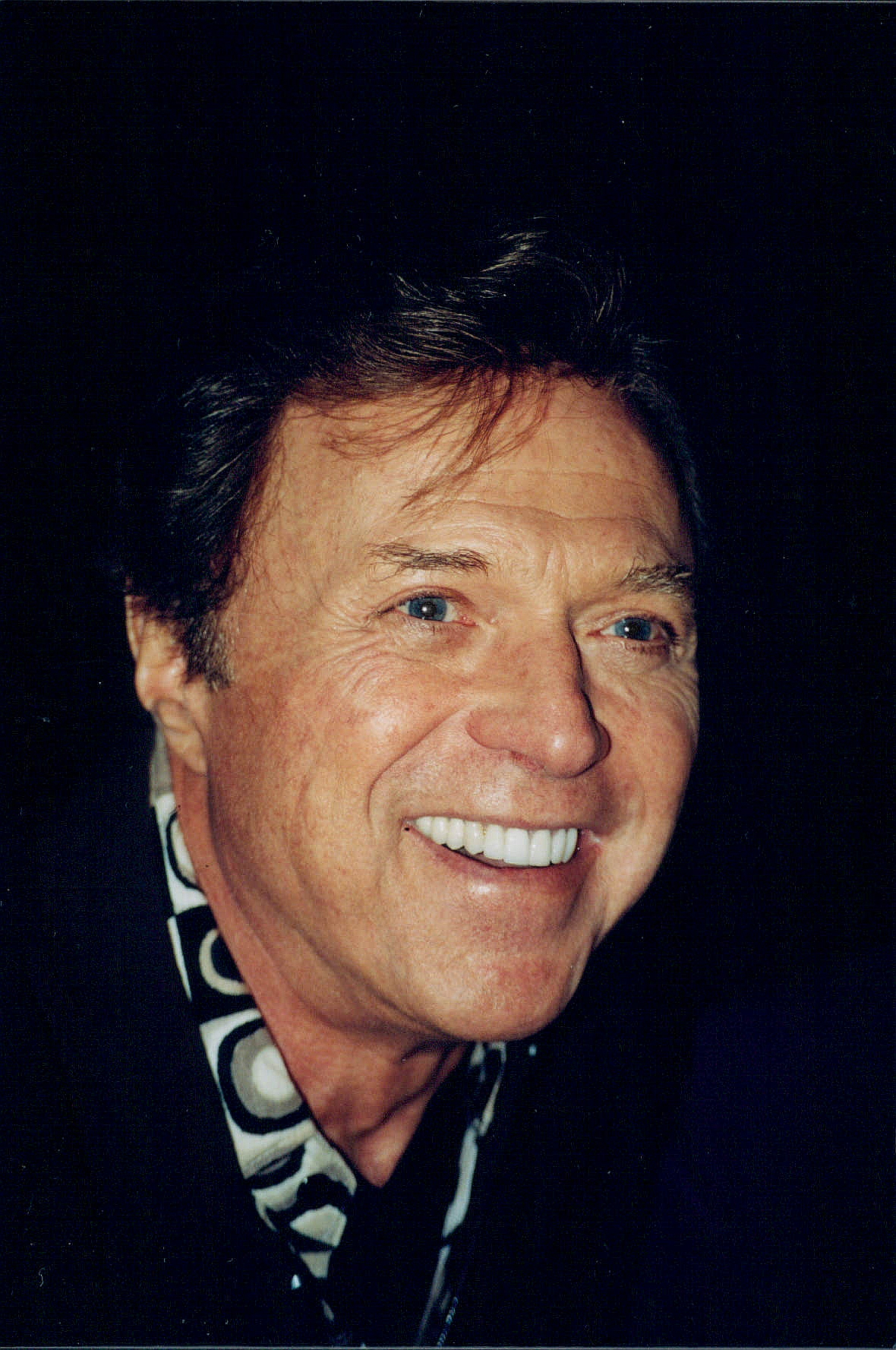
- Lawrence in 1999

Background information
- Born: Sidney Liebowitz; July 8, 1935; New York, New York, U.S.
- Died: March 7, 2024 (aged 88) Los Angeles, California, U.S.
- Genres: Big band; swing; traditional pop; doo-wop
- Occupations: Singer; actor; entertainer; comedian
- Years active: 1953–2019
- Spouse: Eydie Gormé (m. 1957; died 2013)
- Website: steveandeydie.com

Steve Lawrence (born Sidney Liebowitz; July 8, 1935 – March 7, 2024) was an American singer, comedian, and actor. He was best known as a member of the pop duo Steve and Eydie, with his wife Eydie Gormé. Lawrence also played the featured role of Maury Sline, the manager and friend of the main characters in the 1980 blockbuster film The Blues Brothers and its sequel. Lawrence and Gormé first appeared together as regulars on Tonight Starring Steve Allen in 1954 and continued performing as a duo until Gormé's retirement in 2009.

== Early life ==
Lawrence was born on July 8, 1935, as Sidney Liebowitz to Jewish parents in the borough of Brooklyn in New York City. His father, Max, was a cantor at the Brooklyn synagogue Beth Sholom Tomchei Harav, and his mother, Helen, was a homemaker. He attended Thomas Jefferson High School. During high school, Lawrence skipped school to spend time at the Brill Building in the hopes of being employed as a singer.

== Career ==
In 1952 at the age of 16, Lawrence signed a contract with King Records after a winning performance on Arthur Godfrey's Talent Scouts. The next year, talk show host Steve Allen hired Lawrence to be one of the singers on Allen's local New York City late night show on WNBC-TV, with vocalists Eydie Gormé and Andy Williams. The show was chosen by NBC to be seen on the national network, becoming The Tonight Show, and Lawrence, Gormé, and Williams stayed until the program's end in 1957. Lawrence credited the exposure and experience he gained on Allen's show for launching his career “I think Steve Allen was the biggest thing that happened to me. Every night I was called upon to do something different. In its own way, it was better than vaudeville.”

In the late 1950s, Lawrence was drafted into the U.S. Army and served as the official vocal soloist with the United States Army Band "Pershing's Own" in Washington, D.C.

Lawrence had success by means of the musical hit parades in the late 1950s and early 1960s with hits, including "Party Doll" (U.S. No. 5), "Pretty Blue Eyes" (U.S. No. 9), "Footsteps" (U.S. No. 7), "Portrait of My Love" (U.S. No. 9), and "Go Away Little Girl" (U.S. No. 1). "Go Away Little Girl" sold over 1 million copies and was awarded a Gold record. However, much of Lawrence's musical career was centered on nightclubs and the musical stage.

He was also an actor, appearing in guest roles on television shows in every decade since the 1950s. After getting his start with Steve Allen's late night show, he was seen on The Danny Kaye Show; The Judy Garland Show; The Julie Andrews Hour; Night Gallery; The Flip Wilson Show; Police Story; Murder, She Wrote; Diagnosis: Murder; and CSI. Lawrence and Gormé starred in the 1958 summer replacement series The Steve Lawrence and Eydie Gormé Show. The Steve Lawrence Show, with supporting actor Charles Nelson Reilly, ran for 13 weeks in 1965. It was a variety show and one of the later television shows to air in black and white. Lawrence also served as a panelist on What's My Line? (1950–67). According to an interview from TCM, he made 29 appearances on The Carol Burnett Show (1967–1978), with and without Gormé.

In 1964, Lawrence starred in the Broadway musical What Makes Sammy Run?, which centered on an ambitious young man clawing his way to the top in Hollywood. It ran for 540 performances at the 54th Street Theater.

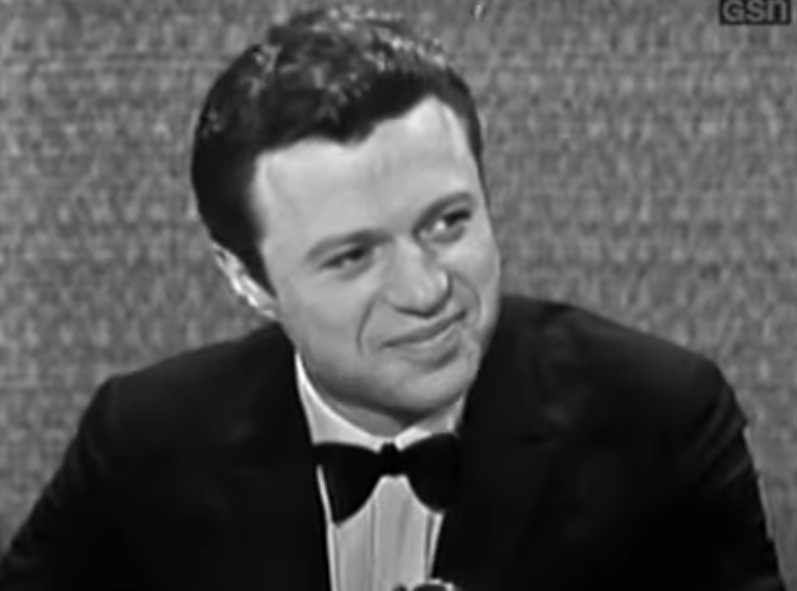
Steve Lawrence on the August 23, 1964 episode of CBS Television's What's My Line

Lawrence and Gormé appeared together in the Broadway musical Golden Rainbow, which ran from February 1968 to January 1969. Although the show was not a huge success, the show contained the memorable song "I've Gotta Be Me". A summary of this experience is chronicled in William Goldman's 1968 book The Season). This song originally was sung by Lawrence at the end of the first act of the musical. Sammy Davis Jr. later recorded a version of the song that hit number 11 on the U.S. Billboard Hot 100 singles chart in 1969.

Lawrence starred as Gary McBride in the 1972 film Stand Up and Be Counted. In 1980, he was introduced to a new generation of fans with his portrayal of Maury Sline in The Blues Brothers, and reprised the role in the 1998 sequel Blues Brothers 2000. Lawrence's other films include The Lonely Guy (1984) and The Yards (2000). In 1984, Lawrence and comedian Don Rickles hosted ABC's Foul-Ups, Bleeps & Blunders. In 1985, Lawrence and Gormé respectively appeared as Tweedledum and Tweedledee in Irwin Allen's film adaptation of Alice in Wonderland.

Lawrence played Mark McCormick's father, Sonny Daye, in two episodes of Hardcastle and McCormick. He appeared on The Nanny several times — first as himself in season 2, episode 14, and then as Morty Fine, father of Fran Fine, in a few of the final episodes of the show. In 2011, he portrayed Jack, a wealthy love interest of Betty White's character on Hot in Cleveland. In 2014, he guest-starred in an episode of Two and a Half Men on CBS and sang the theme song to the parody miniseries The Spoils of Babylon.

== Personal life and death ==
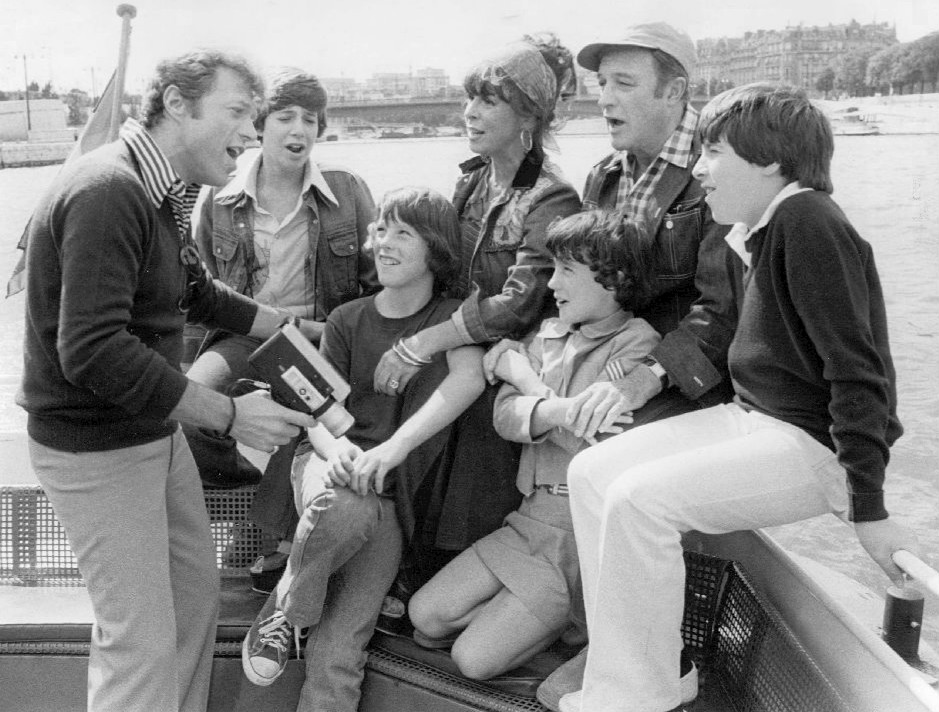
Lawrence and Gormé with sons David (left) and Michael (right). Gene Kelly is also pictured with his son, Tim (right) and daughter, Bridget (left). Kelly was a guest on the couple's 1975 television special, Our Love Is Here to Stay.

Lawrence and Gormé were married on December 29, 1957, at the El Rancho Vegas in Las Vegas, Nevada. They had two sons: David Nessim Lawrence (b. 1960) is an ASCAP Award-winning composer, who wrote the score for High School Musical, and Michael Robert Lawrence (1962–1986), who died suddenly from ventricular fibrillation resulting from an undiagnosed heart condition at the age of 23. Michael was an assistant editor for a television show at the time of his death and was apparently healthy despite a previous diagnosis of slight arrhythmia. Gormé and Lawrence were in Atlanta, Georgia, at the time of Michael's death, having performed at the Fox Theatre the night before. Upon learning of the death, family friend Frank Sinatra sent his private plane to fly the couple to New York to meet David, who was attending school at the time. Following their son's death, Gormé and Lawrence took a year off before touring again.

On May 26, 1978 Lawrence rolled the ceremonial first dice at the Resorts International Hotel in Atlantic City, NJ. This marked the opening of the first legal casino in the U.S. outside of Nevada.

Eydie Gormé died on August 10, 2013, at age 84, following an undisclosed illness.

Lawrence and his wife lived in Las Vegas and had a home in Los Angeles.

In June 2019, following public speculation about his health, Lawrence announced that he was in the early stages of Alzheimer's disease and that treatment to slow its progression had so far been successful. Lawrence died from complications due to Alzheimer's disease in Los Angeles, on March 7, 2024, at the age of 88. He is interred next to Eydie Gorme at the Hillside Memorial Park Cemetery in Culver City, California.

David Lawrence tours with a tribute show to his parents entitled "A Toast to Steve and Eydie".

== Awards ==
Lawrence received nominations for a New York Drama Critics' Circle Award and a Tony Award for his performance as Sammy Glick in What Makes Sammy Run? on Broadway (1964).

With Gormé, he was nominated for two Emmy Awards, one for Our Love Is Here to Stay, a tribute to George and Ira Gershwin. They won the 1979 Emmy for an Outstanding Comedy-Variety or Music Program for Steve & Eydie Celebrate Irving Berlin. They also received a "Best Performance By a Vocal Duo or Group" Grammy Award for We Got Us; a Film Advisory Board's Award of Excellence and a Television Critics Circle Award for From This Moment On, a tribute to Cole Porter.

The duo also won a Las Vegas Entertainment Award for Musical Variety Act of the Year four times, three of them consecutively. They were honored with a lifetime achievement award from the Songwriters Hall of Fame, and in 1995 were the recipients of an Ella Lifetime Achievement Award from the Society of Singers, a non-profit organization that helps professional singers with counseling and financial assistance.

== In popular culture ==
Lawrence was portrayed by Mike Myers in the popular Saturday Night Live sketch "The Sinatra Group", with Victoria Jackson portraying his wife Eydie Gormé.
