= Alone Together (Donny Osmond album) =

Studio album by Donny Osmond
- Released: March 17, 1973
- Genre: Pop, R&B
- Length: 28:59
- Label: MGM
- Producer: Alan Osmond, Michael Lloyd, Don Costa, Mike Curb

Donny Osmond chronology
My Best to You (1972)	Alone Together (1973)	A Time for Us (1973)

Singles from Alone Together
- 1. "The Twelfth of Never" Released: February 24, 1973; 2. "Young Love" Released: July 7, 1973

Alone Together is the fifth studio album by American pop singer Donny Osmond, released in 1973. It reached number 26 on the Billboard pop albums chart on May 12, 1973. Two singles were released in support of the album, "The Twelfth of Never" and "Young Love," reaching No. 8 and No. 23 on the Billboard Hot 100 singles chart, respectively. The album was certified Gold in the U.K. on December 1, 1973.

== Track listing ==
No.	Title	Writer(s)	Length
1.	"Life Is Just What You Make It"	Alan Osmond, Merrill Osmond	3:04
2.	"The Twelfth of Never"	Jerry Livingston, Paul Francis Webster	3:04
3.	"Sunshine Rose"	Neil Sedaka, Howard Greenfield	3:04
4.	"Do You Want Me"	Alan Osmond, Merrill Osmond, Wayne Osmond	3:38
5.	"It's Hard To Say Goodbye"	Alan Osmond	2:53
6.	"Young Love"	Ric Cartey, Carole Joyner	2:35
7.	"Who Can I Turn To (When Nobody Needs Me)"	Anthony Newley, Leslie Bricusse	2:42
8.	"The Other Side of Me"	Sedaka, Greenfield	2:40
9.	"Tears on My Pillow"	Alan Osmond	2:47
10.	"It Takes A Lot Of Love"	Alan Osmond, Merrill Osmond	2:32

== Charts ==
=== Weekly charts ===
Weekly chart performance for Alone Together
Chart (1973)	Peak position
Australia (Kent Music Report)	28
Canada	22
UK Albums (OCC)	6
US Billboard 200	26

=== Monthly charts ===
Monthly chart performance for Alone Together
Chart (1977)	Peak position
Soviet International Albums (MK)	1

== Certifications and sales ==
Region	Certification	Certified units/sales
United Kingdom (BPI)	Gold	100,000^{^}
^{^} Shipments figures based on certification alone.
