= Too Young (Sidney Lippman and Sylvia Dee song) =

1951 popular song

"Too Young" is a popular song, with music written by Sidney Lippman and lyrics by Sylvia Dee. A recording of the song was released by Nat King Cole in 1951, which reached No. 1 in the United States and became the best-selling song of the year. The song was an early attempt by music labels to appeal to the younger demographics and its success later led to a boom in music that catered to the young. Another successful version was released by Donny Osmond in 1972.

== Nat King Cole recording ==
"Too Young"

Single by Nat King Cole
- B-side: "That's My Girl"
- Released: March 1951
- Recorded: February 1951
- Studio: Capitol, 5515 Melrose Ave, Hollywood
- Length: 3:11
- Label: Capitol Records
- Songwriters: Sidney Lippman; Sylvia Dee

Nat King Cole singles chronology
"Always You" (1951)	"Too Young" (1951)	"Red Sails in the Sunset" (1951)

"Too Young" was one of the early attempts by record labels to release songs with a young musical persona that might appeal to a young audience. In the United States, among the earliest versions were those recorded by Victor Young and His Orchestra, and Johnny Desmond. However, it was the version recorded by Nat King Cole that proved to be most successful.

The song was recorded on February 6, 1951, and released by Capitol Records (catalog number 1449) in March. It reached the number one position on the Billboard chart in June 1951, staying there for five weeks and altogether on the Best Seller chart for 29 weeks. It also spent an unprecedented 12 weeks on top of Your Hit Parade, and 8 weeks at No. 1 on the Cash Box chart. It was a million-selling record and Billboard ranked this version as the number one best-selling song of 1951. Cole described this song as one of his three favorites among his own songs.

The success of the song may have convinced record executives that young people had the buying power, which would lead to the boom of rock and roll music that catered to a young audience in the mid-'50s.

=== Charts ===
Chart (1951)	Peak position
US Billboard Best Selling Pop Singles	1
US Cash Box Best Selling Singles	1

== Other early versions ==
Several versions contemporary to Nat King Cole's version were recorded, some making the US charts but not as high.

The recording by Patty Andrews was released by Decca Records as catalog number 27569. It first reached the Billboard Best Seller chart on June 8, 1951 and lasted one week on the chart, peaking at number 30. On other Billboard charts, this version reached as high as number 19 on the Most-played Jukebox Records chart.

Versions that did not make the top 30 best-seller list, but did chart on various other Billboard charts were by Toni Arden (Columbia, number 15 on Records Most Played by Disk Jockeys), by Fran Allison (RCA, number 20 on Records Most Played by Disk Jockeys), and by Richard Hayes (Mercury, number 24).

Semprini, piano with rhythm accompaniment recorded it in London on July 7, 1951, as the second song of the medley "Dancing to the piano (No. 7): Part 1. Hit Medley of Slow Foxtrots" along with "Alice in Wonderland" and "Forbidden Love". It was released by EMI on the His Master's Voice label as catalog number B 10123.

In the United Kingdom, Jimmy Young had a success with his version of the song, also made in 1951. The song made No. 1 on the UK's sheet music charts in 1951, spending 12 weeks in that position. Another contemporary version was released by Steve Conway.

== Donny Osmond cover ==
"Too Young"

Single by Donny Osmond

from the album Too Young
- B-side: "Love Me"
- Released: June 10, 1972
- Recorded: April 17, 1972
- Genre: Pop
- Length: 2:59
- Label: MGM
- Songwriters: Sidney Lippman; Sylvia Dee
- Producers: Mike Curb; Don Costa

Donny Osmond singles chronology
"Puppy Love" (1972)	"Too Young" (1972)	"Why/Lonely Boy" (1972)

A version of "Too Young" by then 14-year-old Donny Osmond became an international top 10 hit for him, reaching number 5 in the UK and number 6 in Canada. It also spent eight weeks on the U.S. top 40, with a peak position of number 13 when released as a single (MGM catalog number 14407) in 1972.

=== Chart history ===
==== Weekly charts ====
Chart (1972)	Peak position
Australia	13
Canada RPM Top Singles	6
Ireland (IRMA)	2
New Zealand (Listener)	3
UK (The Official Charts Company)	5
US Billboard Hot 100	13
US Adult Contemporary (Billboard)	23
US Cash Box Top 100	8

==== Year-end charts ====
Chart (1972)	Rank
Canada	98
UK	65

== Other versions ==
- Sam Cooke recorded it for his Hits of the Fifties LP in 1960.
- In Australia, on Parlophone, Jim Gussey And His Orchestra, with vocals by Matt Dryden and Olive Lester, released their version.
- Bobby Vinton recorded the song for the album There! I've Said It Again.
- Michael Jackson included the song on Motown in 1973 in the album Music & Me. This version was released as a single in Italy.
- In 1978, the Swedish dansband Vikingarna released a disco version of the song on their album, The Vikings Export.
- Johnny Mathis recorded the song for his album "Song Sung Blue" in 1972, CBS 65161.
