= Go Away Little Girl =

Popular song written by Gerry Goffin and Carole King

Single by Steve Lawrence
- B-side: "If You Love Her Tell Her So"
- Released: November 1962
- Genre: Pop
- Length: 2:12
- Label: Columbia
- Songwriters: Gerry Goffin and Carole King

Steve Lawrence singles chronology
"House Without Windows" (1962)	"Go Away Little Girl" (1962)	"Don't Be Afraid, Little Darlin'" (1963)

"Go Away Little Girl" is a popular song written by Gerry Goffin and Carole King. It was first recorded by Bobby Vee for Liberty Records on March 28, 1962. The lyrics consist of a young man asking a young attractive woman to stay away from him, so that he will not be tempted to betray his steady girlfriend by kissing her. The song is notable for making the American Top 20 three times: for Steve Lawrence in 1963 (US number 1), for The Happenings in 1966 (US number 12; CAN number 10), and for Donny Osmond in 1971 (US number 1). It is also the first song, and one of only nine, to reach US number 1 by two different artists. Also notable in each of the solo versions is the similar double-tracked treatment of the singer's voice.

== Steve Lawrence version ==
In late 1962, Steve Lawrence released the second recording of this song (Bobby Vee recorded it first in March 1962). The single reached number 1 on the Billboard Hot 100 in January 1963 and remained in the top position for two weeks. This recording also spent six weeks atop the U.S. Easy Listening chart. "Go Away Little Girl" went to number 14 on the Hot R&B Singles chart. Outside the US, "Go Away Little Girl" also went to number 1 on the New Zealand Lever chart and number 18 in Canada.

== Mark Wynter version ==
Mark Wynter's 1962 cover of the song on the Pye Records label also made the UK Singles Chart, reaching number 6 in the United Kingdom.

== Donny Osmond version ==
"Go Away Little Girl"

Single by Donny Osmond

from the album To You With Love, Donny
- B-side: "The Wild Rover (Time to Ride)"
- Released: July 31, 1971
- Genre: Pop, bubblegum pop, blue-eyed soul
- Length: 2:42
- Label: MGM
- Songwriters: Gerry Goffin and Carole King

Donny Osmond singles chronology
"Sweet and Innocent" (1971)	"Go Away Little Girl" (1971)	"Hey Girl" / "I Knew You When" (1971)

Donny Osmond's cover version of "Go Away Little Girl" reached number 1 on the Billboard Hot 100 chart on September 11, 1971. It remained in the top position for three weeks. Osmond's version also went to number 36 on the Australian Go-Set chart. It was certified Gold by the RIAA on October 13, 1971. Osmond was 13 at the time the song was recorded.

=== Charts ===
Chart (1971)	Peak position
Australia (Kent Music Report)	52
Canada RPM Adult Contemporary	4
Canada RPM Top Singles	1
South Africa (Springbok)	14
US Billboard Hot 100	1
US Easy Listening	14

=== Certifications ===
Region	Certification	Certified units/sales
United States (RIAA)	Gold	1,000,000^{^}
^{^} Shipments figures based on certification alone.

== Marlena Shaw version ==
Marlena Shaw does a version called "Yu-Ma/Go Away Little Boy" from her 1977 album Sweet Beginnings. This reached number 21 on the Billboard R&B chart staying in the Top 100 for 11 weeks. In the 1980s it became a popular UK record on the Rare Groove dance scene. Ms. Shaw also performed a 9:31 live version of her "Go Away Little Boy" recorded for her It Is Love album.
