= Steve and Eydie =

American pop vocal duo

Steve & Eydie
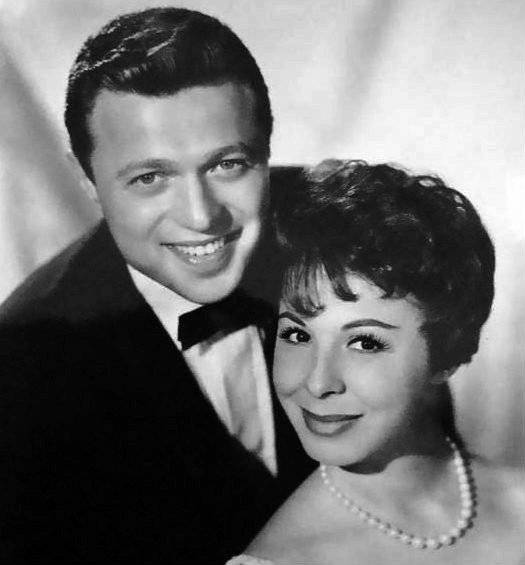
- Steve and Eydie in 1962

Background information
- Origin: United States
- Genres: Pop; jazz
- Years active: 1954 – 2009
- Labels: ABC-Paramount; Atco; Canadian-American; CBS; Columbia; Coral; DME; His Master's Voice; London; MGM; RCA; Savoy; Time; UAR; WBR
- Members: Steve Lawrence; Eydie Gormé

Steve and Eydie were American pop vocal duo Steve Lawrence and Eydie Gormé. They began working together in 1954 on Tonight Starring Steve Allen, and in a career spanning a half century, they became "a ubiquitous presence on records, television variety shows and in nightclubs from Las Vegas to the Catskills." They performed together until Gormé retired in 2009. They also had separate careers as solo singers.

Steve's birth name was Sidney Leibowitz. Edith "Eydie" Gormé was from a multilingual Sephardic Jewish family whose surname was variously spelled Gorman and Gormezano. The two were married from 1957 until Gormé's death in 2013.

== Career ==
They recorded on various labels including Coral and ABC-Paramount in the 1950s, United Artists, Columbia, and RCA in the 1960s, and MGM in the 1970s. They released their last US chart record on Warner Bros. Records in 1979 as Parker & Penny, titled "Hallelujah" (B Side: "Broken Hearts, Broken Promises").

Their 1960 song "We Got Us" was not released as a single but was the title tune on an ABC-Paramount LP album. The album earned them a Grammy Award that year.

From February 1968 to January 1969, Steve and Eydie starred in the Broadway musical Golden Rainbow. In their later career together, they devoted performances to interpretations of the Great American Songbook.

The duo was nominated for two Emmy Awards, one for Our Love Is Here to Stay, a tribute to George and Ira Gershwin. Steve & Eydie Celebrate Irving Berlin won the 1979 Emmy for Outstanding Comedy-Variety or Music Program.

They received a Film Advisory Board's Award of Excellence and a Television Critics Circle Award for From This Moment On, a tribute to Cole Porter.

On four occasions, Steve and Eydie won a Las Vegas Entertainment Award for Musical Variety Act of the Year, three of them consecutively. They were honored with a lifetime achievement award from the Songwriters Hall of Fame, and in 1995 were the recipients of an Ella Lifetime Achievement Award from the Society of Singers, a non-profit organization that helps professional singers with counseling and financial assistance.

== Later life ==
In November 2009, Lawrence embarked on a musical tour without Gormé, who stayed home for health reasons. The Steve and Eydie official website confirmed in late 2010 that Gormé had officially retired from touring, for health reasons, and Lawrence would be touring alone from then on.

Eydie Gormé died on August 10, 2013, six days shy of her 85th birthday. Lawrence continued to tour until being diagnosed with Alzheimer's disease in 2019 and died from complications of the disease on March 7, 2024.

== Singles ==
Year	Single (A-side, B-side) Both sides from same album except where indicated	Chart positions					Album
Year	Single (A-side, B-side) Both sides from same album except where indicated	US	CB	US AC	US R&B	UK	Album
1954	"Make Yourself Comfortable"; B-side by Eydie Gorme: "I've Gotta Crow"	—	—	—	—	—	Presenting Steve & Eydie [1967 compilation album]
1955	"Knickerbocker Mambo"; B-side by Eydie Gorme: "Give a Fool a Chance"	—	—	—	—	—	Presenting Steve & Eydie [1967 compilation album]
1955	"(Close Your Eyes) Take a Deep Breath" b/w "Besame Mucho"	—	—	—	—	—	Presenting Steve & Eydie [1967 compilation album]
1959	"Sentimental Me" b/w "You Can't Be True, Dear"	—	—	—	—	—	Our Best to You [1964 compilation album]
1960	"This Could Be the Start of Something" b/w "Darn It, Baby, That's Love"	—	113	—	—	—	We Got Us [1960]
1961	"The Facts of Life" b/w "I'm a Girl, You're a Boy"	—	—	—	—	—	Non-album tracks
1963	"I Want to Stay Here" b/w "Ain't Love" (from It's Us Again)	28	28	8	—	3	Something's Gotta Give
1963	"I Can't Stop Talking About You" b/w "To the Movies We Go" (from At the Movies)	35	51	14	—	—	Something's Gotta Give
1964	"That Holiday Feeling" b/w "Happy Holiday"	—	—	—	—	—	That Holiday Feeling! [1964]
1967	"The Honeymoon Is Over" b/w "Together Forever"	—	—	14	—	—	Together on Broadway [1967]
1967	"Mame" b/w "Cabaret"	—	—	—	—	—	Together on Broadway [1967]
1967	"Summer, Summer Wind" b/w "Be Still"	—	—	—	—	—	Steve & Eydie, Bonfa & Brazil
1968	"The Two of Us" b/w "Mr. Spoons" (Non-album track)	—	—	33	—	—	This Is Steve & Eydie [1971 compilation album]
1968	"Dear World" b/w "A Break at Love" (Non-album track)	—	—	—	—	—	This Is Steve & Eydie [1971 compilation album]
1968	"Hurry Home for Christmas" b/w "Dedicated to Love" (Non-album track)	—	—	—	—	—	Christmastime In Carol and Song [1969]
1969	"Real True Lovin'" b/w "Chapter One"	119	—	20	—	—	Real True Lovin' [1969]
1970	"(You're My) Soul & Inspiration" b/w "Now I Love the World Again" (Non-album track)	—	—	21	—	—	This Is Steve & Eydie [1971 compilation album]
1970	"Did You Give the World Some Love Today, Babe?" b/w "For All We Know"	—	—	—	—	—	Non-album tracks
1971	"Love Is Blue"/"Autumn Leaves" b/w "Hi Sweetie" (Non-album track)	—	—	37	—	—	A Man and A Woman [1970]
1971	"Lead Me On" b/w "Tea for Two" (Non-album track)	—	—	—	—	—	The World of Steve & Eydie
1972	"We Can Make It Together" (featuring The Osmonds)" b/w "E Fini" (with The Mike Curb Congregation)	68	64	7	—	—	The World of Steve & Eydie
1973	"Feelin'" b/w "It Never Rains in Southern California"	—	—	31	—	—	Feelin' [1973]
1979	"Hallelujah" b/w "Broken Hearts, Broken Promises"; As "Parker & Penny"	—	—	46	—	—	Non-album tracks
