= Hey Girl (Freddie Scott song) =

1963 single by Freddie Scott

Single by Freddie Scott

from the album Freddie Scott Sings
- B-side: "The Slide"
- Released: June 1963
- Genre: Pop
- Length: 3:04
- Label: Colpix
- Songwriters: Gerry Goffin, Carole King
- Producer: Gerry Goffin

Freddie Scott singles chronology
"Hey Girl" (1963)	"I Got a Woman" (1963)

"Hey Girl" is a song written and composed by Gerry Goffin and Carole King. It first became a popular Top ten hit on the Billboard Hot 100 in August 1963 when recorded by Freddie Scott. Donny Osmond took the song back to the Billboard top ten chart with his cover in 1971. Billy Joel recorded a version of the song for his 1997 album Greatest Hits Volume III.

== Chart performance ==
Scott's version peaked at number ten on both the Billboard Hot 100 pop singles and R&B charts.

Chart (1963)	Peak position
Canada (CHUM Hit Parade)	20
U.S. Billboard Hot 100	10
U.S. Billboard R&B Singles	10
U.S. Cash Box Top 100	10

== Donny Osmond version ==
"Hey Girl"

Single by Donny Osmond

from the album Portrait of Donny
- B-side: "I Knew You When"
- Released: November 6, 1971
- Recorded: September 10, 1971
- Genre: Pop
- Length: 3:13
- Label: MGM
- Songwriters: Gerry Goffin, Carole King
- Producer: Rick Hall

Donny Osmond singles chronology
"Go Away Little Girl" (1971)	"Hey Girl" (1971)	"Puppy Love" (1972)

=== Background ===
Donny Osmond released a version of this song on November 6, 1971. It reached No. 9 on the Billboard Hot 100 on January 15, 1972. It was certified Gold by the RIAA on July 28, 1972.

=== Chart performance ===
Chart (1971–72)	Peak position
Australia (Kent Music Report)	82
Canada RPM Top Singles	4
U.S. Billboard Hot 100	9
U.S. Billboard Adult Contemporary	21
U.S. Cash Box Top 100	9

=== Certifications ===
Region	Certification	Certified units/sales
United States (RIAA)	Gold	1,000,000^{^}
^{^} Shipments figures based on certification alone.

=== Chart performance ===
Chart (1997)	Peak position
U.S. Billboard Adult Contemporary	13

== Billy Joel version ==
In 1997, "Hey Girl" was one of three cover songs Billy Joel included on his album Greatest Hits Volume III. In an interview for Billboard, Joel said of the song, "I recorded that song a few years ago. I had split up with Christie [Brinkley] and my daughter was going to live far away, and I was very sad. When I sang that song, that's who I was singing it to, my little girl."
