= Don Costa =

American recording artist, conductor, record producer, music arranger, jazz guitarist

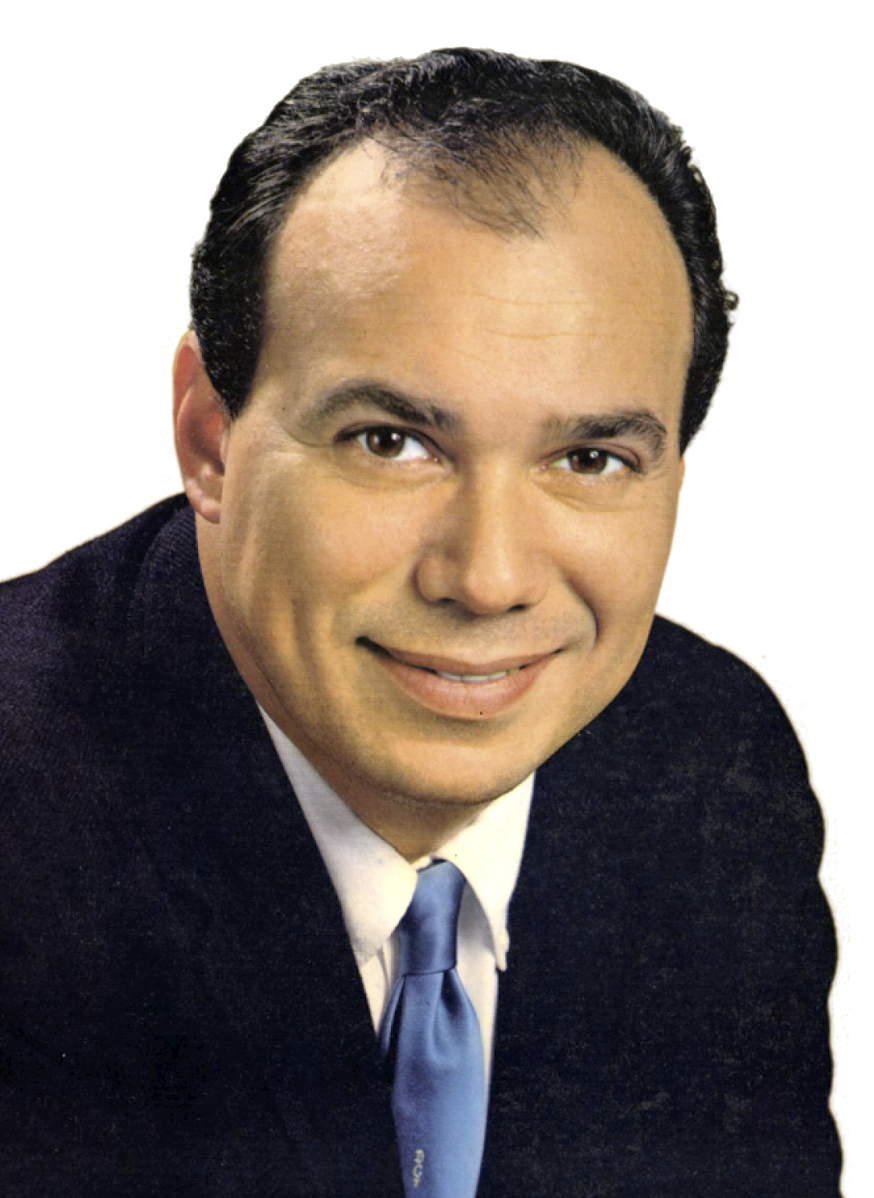
- Costa in 1961

Background information
- Born: Dominick P. Costa; June 10, 1925; Boston, Massachusetts, U.S.
- Died: January 19, 1983 (aged 57) New York City, U.S.
- Genres: Pop; jazz
- Occupations: Conductor; arranger; record producer; musician
- Instrument: Guitar

Dominick P. "Don" Costa (June 10, 1925 – January 19, 1983) was an American conductor and record producer. He discovered singer Paul Anka and worked on several hit albums by Frank Sinatra, including Sinatra and Strings and My Way.

== Career ==
Costa was born in Boston, Massachusetts, United States, to an Italian American family. As a child, he took a keen interest in learning the guitar, and he became a member of the CBS Radio Orchestra by the time he was in his teens. In the late 1940s, Costa moved to New York City to further his career by becoming a session musician. He played guitar with Bucky Pizzarelli on Vaughn Monroe's hit record "Ghost Riders in the Sky". It was around this time that Costa started experimenting with combinations of instruments, producing musical arrangements, and selling them to big bands.

Steve Lawrence and Eydie Gormé invited Costa to write vocal backgrounds for their recordings. He agreed and thus began an association that led to their joining a record label headed by Sam Clark, ABC-Paramount Records. Costa accepted the position of head A&R man as well as chief arranger and producer. Many hits were to follow, not only with Lawrence and Gormé, but with Lloyd Price, George Hamilton IV, and Paul Anka. Apart from his arranging skills, Costa was a guitarist. Between 1956 and 1957, he released two 45s on ABC-Paramount using the alias Muvva "Guitar" Hubbard. He wrote the first, "Ponytail", as an R&B instrumental. The second was a cover version of "Raunchy" by Bill Justis.

In 1957, he signed 15-year-old Carole King to her first recording contract on the strength of her performance after she talked her way into an audition at his office.

In 1959, Costa, Lawrence, and Gormé left ABC for United Artists Records. Costa became A&R director. He arranged and produced albums for others and released his own instrumental albums. His hits included the theme songs from Never on Sunday and The Unforgiven. "Never on Sunday" sold over one million copies and was awarded a gold disc. The song peaked at No. 27 in the United Kingdom in late 1960 and No. 13 in Canada, while the theme from The Unforgiven ("The Need For Love") peaked at No. 27 on the U.S. Hot 100 and No. 15 in Canada. In Cash Box magazine, Costa was voted the best pop orchestra leader of 1960.

During this time, Frank Sinatra formed Reprise Records and hired Costa to arrange the album Sinatra and Strings, released in 1962. This set of standard ballads would remain one of the most critically acclaimed works of Sinatra's Reprise period. His later work moved away from orchestra arrangement. Songs on the album include "All or Nothing at All", a verse-only version of "Stardust", a ballad rendition of "Night and Day" which provided a contrast to Sinatra's more-familiar big band version, and "Come Rain or Come Shine", which frequently is included in compilations from Sinatra's Reprise years.

During the next year, Costa was asked to arrange for the Sarah Vaughan album, Snowbound. Barbra Streisand used the same arrangement of "Snowbound" for her second Christmas album for Sony in 2001. Costa also arranged Tony Bennett's 1965 album If I Ruled the World: Songs for the Jet Set.

Between 1964 and 1968, Costa arranged four Columbia releases for Eydie Gormé: Gorme Country Style (1964), Softly, As I Leave You (1966), Don't Go To Strangers (1966), and The Look of Love (1968).

In the mid-1960s, Costa moved from New York City to Hollywood and in 1964 formed DCP International through United Artists. His label revived the career of popular 1950s act Little Anthony and the Imperials. Working with producer Teddy Randazzo, Little Anthony had a fresh string of hits, including "Goin' Out of My Head" and "Hurt So Bad". In 1963, Costa discovered Trini Lopez working at PJ's, a Hollywood nightclub. Later in the decade, Sinatra again called on Costa to become his arranger, and Costa's work with Lawrence and Gormé abated. During this period, Sinatra scored one of his biggest hits, the Paul Anka adaptation of "My Way" (from the French "Comme d'habitude"). UA Records acquired DCP International in 1966 and renamed the label Veep Records.

== Later years and death ==
In the early 1970s, Costa was conducting for Sinatra in Las Vegas as well as arranging his records when Costa suffered a heart attack and required bypass surgery. After recovering, he started working with Mike Curb at MGM Records, producing and arranging material for the Osmond Brothers, as well as having a hand in Sammy Davis Jr.'s "The Candy Man" (1972), "We Can Make it Together" by Steve & Eydie featuring the Osmonds (1972), and Petula Clark's cover of "My Guy" (1971).

In 1980, Costa received his fourth Grammy nomination for orchestrating what became another signature song for Sinatra, "Theme from New York, New York". Costa then scored a hit in 1981 with his daughter Nikka, titled "Out Here on My Own". The two were planning a follow-up when Costa died of a second heart attack on January 19, 1983, in New York City. He was 57 years old.

== Selected discography ==
- Music to Break a Sub-Lease (ABC-Paramount, 1958)
- The Theme from "The Unforgiven" (United Artists, 1960)
- Magnificent Motion Picture Music (United Artists, 1961)
- Hollywood Premiere! (Columbia, 1962)
- Days of Wine and Roses (Harmony, 1966)
- Modern Delights (Verve, 1967)
- The Don Costa Concept (Mercury, 1969)

== See also ==
- List of jazz arrangers
- List of music arrangers
