= Donny Osmond =

American singer, dancer, actor, television host (born 1957)

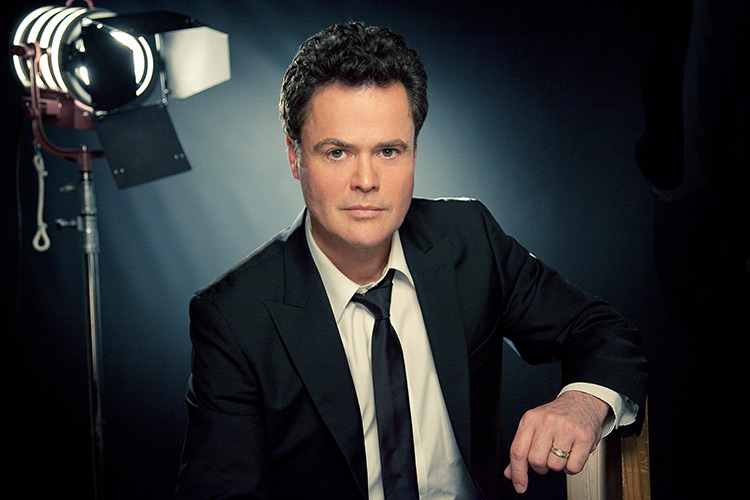
- Osmond in 2010
- Born: Donald Clark Osmond; December 9, 1957 (age 68); Ogden, Utah, U.S.
- Occupations: Singer; songwriter; actor; television host; dancer
- Years active: 1963–present
- Spouse: Debra Glenn (m. 1978)
- Children: 5
- Parents: George Osmond; Olive Davis
- Musical career
- Genres: Pop; pop rock; bubblegum pop; comedy; country pop
- Instruments: Vocals; piano
- Labels: MGM; Kolob; Uni; Denon; Polydor; Capitol; Universal; Decca
- Formerly of: The Osmonds
- Website: donny.com

Donald Clark Osmond (born December 9, 1957) is an American singer, actor, television host and former teen idol. He gained fame performing with four of his elder brothers as the Osmonds, earning several top ten hits and gold albums. In the early 1970s, Osmond began a solo career, earning several additional top ten songs.

He hosted the 1976–1979 variety series Donny & Marie, with his sister, Marie Osmond. The Donny & Marie duo also released a series of top ten hits and gold albums and hosted a syndicated and Daytime Emmy Award–nominated 1998–2000 talk show. Donny & Marie headlined a Las Vegas residency at the Flamingo Las Vegas from 2008 to 2019.

He also competed on two reality TV shows, winning season 9 of Dancing with the Stars and being named runner-up for season 1 of The Masked Singer. He also hosted the game show Pyramid from 2002 to 2004.

== Early life ==
Osmond was born on December 9, 1957, in Ogden, Utah, as the seventh child of Olive May (née Davis; 1925–2004) and George Virl Osmond (1917–2007). He is the brother of Virl, Tom, Alan, Wayne, Merrill, Jay, Marie, and Jimmy Osmond. Alan, Wayne, Merrill, Jay and Donny were members of the popular singing group Osmond Brothers. Osmond was raised as a member of the Church of Jesus Christ of Latter-day Saints (LDS Church) in Utah along with his siblings.

In his youth, Osmond held a ham radio license, listed as KA7EVD.

Osmond was born with a rare, benign congenital condition known as situs inversus, where some of the body's major organs, such as the heart, are situated on the opposite side of the body from where they would normally be located.

== Music career ==
=== Career beginnings: 1960s and The Andy Williams Show ===
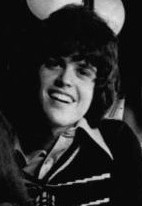
Osmond in 1974

In 1963, Donny Osmond made his debut on The Andy Williams Show at the age of six singing "You Are My Sunshine." Osmond's brothers had been part of the show's cast since December 1962. The brothers, who soon added Donny into the group, continued to perform on the show throughout the 1960s, along with an occasional visit from their sister Marie and brother Jimmy.

=== Teen idol: 1971–1978 ===
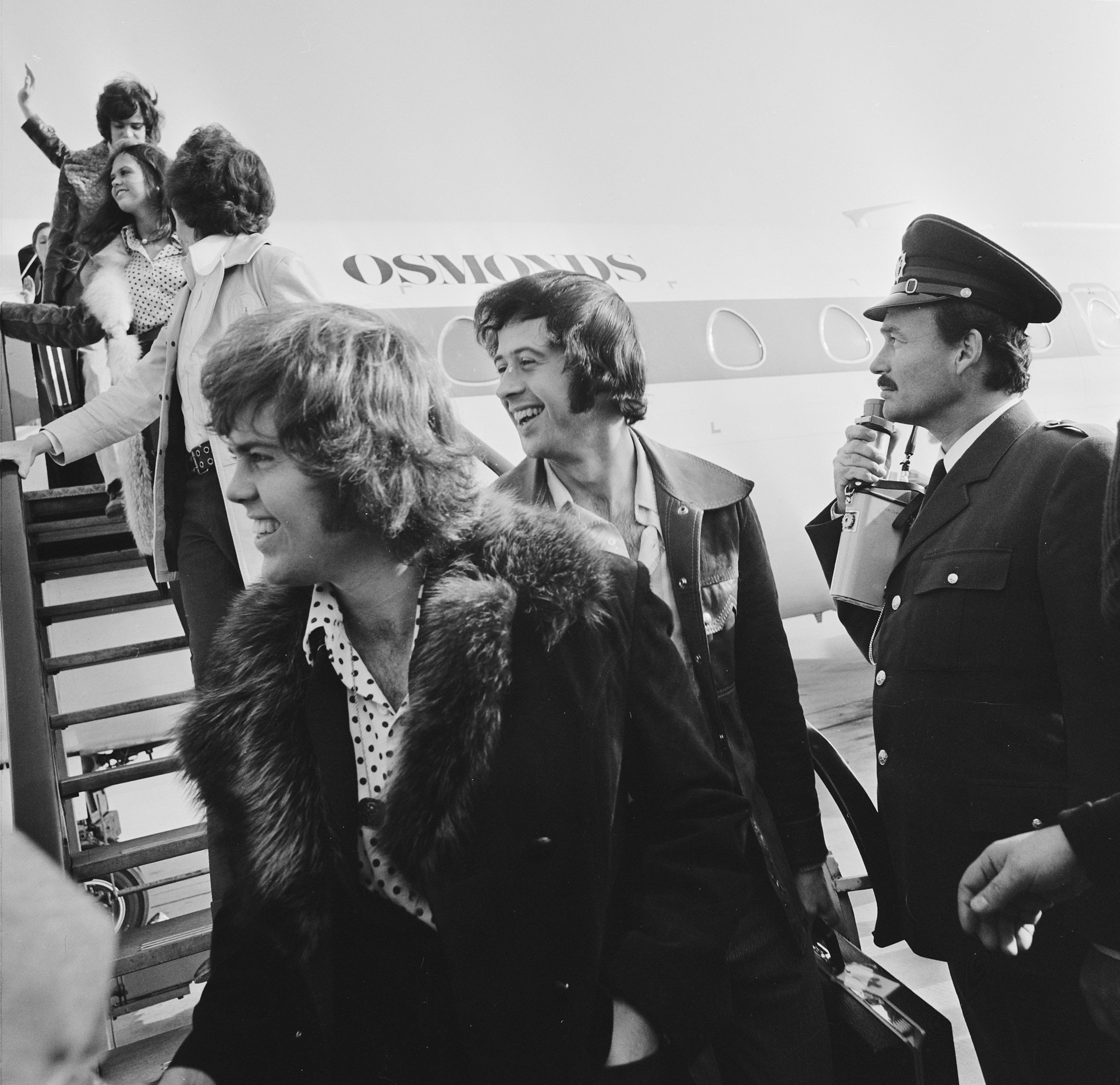
The Osmonds in the Netherlands (1973)

Osmond became a teen idol in the early 1970s as a solo singer, while continuing to sing with his older brothers. Osmond was one of the biggest "cover boy" pop stars for Tiger Beat, Flip and 16 magazines in the early 1970s. His first solo hit was a cover of Roy Orbison's 1958 recording of "Sweet and Innocent", which peaked at no. 7 in the U.S. in 1971. Osmond's follow-ups Steve Lawrence's "Go Away Little Girl" (1971) (U.S. no. 1), Paul Anka's "Puppy Love" (U.S. no. 3), and "Hey Girl/I Knew You When" (U.S. no. 9) (1972) vaulted him into international fame, further advanced by his November 20, 1972, appearance on the Here's Lucy show, where he sang Nat King Cole's "Too Young" to Lucy's niece, played by Eve Plumb, and sang with Lucie Arnaz ("I'll Never Fall in Love Again").

=== Comeback: 1989–1990 ===
In the 1980s, all of the Osmonds abandoned their earlier image—which had originally been crafted to appeal to young viewers—hoping to reach a more adult audience. While his brothers moved toward country music to modest success, Donny was able to revive his career in popular music. He made an unlikely appearance as one of several celebrities and unknowns auditioning to sing for guitarist Jeff Beck in the video for Beck's 1985 single "Ambitious", which was produced by Paul Flattery and directed by Jim Yukich. This was followed in 1986 by an equally unlikely cameo in the animated Luis Cardenas music video "Runaway". He spent several years as a performer, before hiring the services of music and entertainment guru Steven Machat, who got Osmond together with English singer-songwriter Peter Gabriel to see whether Machat and Gabriel could turn Osmond's image into a contemporary young pop act. They succeeded, returning Osmond to the US charts in 1989 with the Billboard Hot 100 no. 2 song "Soldier of Love" (originally announced on radio stations as "from a mystery singer") and its top twenty follow-up "Sacred Emotion". Launching an extensive tour in support of the Eyes Don't Lie record, he enlisted guitarist Dick Smith of Earth Wind & Fire and Kenny Loggins, along with keyboardist Mark Jackson.

=== 1991–2000 ===
Osmond was the guest vocalist on Dweezil Zappa's star-studded version of the Bee Gees' "Stayin' Alive" which appeared on Zappa's 1991 album Confessions. The song also included guitar solos from Zakk Wylde, Steve Lukather, Warren DeMartini, Nuno Bettencourt, and Tim Pierce.

Osmond sang "No One Has to Be Alone", which was heard at the end of the film The Land Before Time IX: Journey to Big Water. He also sang "I'll Make a Man Out of You" for Disney's Mulan.

In 1998 Osmond released "Christmas at Home", which included an extra CD if purchased from Target stores.

=== 2000s ===
In the early 2000s, he released an album of his favorite Broadway songs, and a compilation of popular love songs. In 2004, he returned to the UK Top 10 for the first time as a solo artist since 1973, with the George Benson-sampling "Breeze On By". The song was co-written with former teen idol Gary Barlow, from the 1990s UK boy band Take That, and reached number 8 on the UK charts. The associated album What I Meant to Say marked his songwriting debut; though his older brothers Alan, Merrill and Wayne had written much of the Osmonds' music in the 1970s, Donny had never had a hand in writing that music and had not publicly performed any of his own compositions until then.

His 17th solo album (and 61st album including those with his siblings), The Soundtrack of My Life, released in 2014, features a collection of cover songs with personal meaning to Osmond. He enlisted Stevie Wonder to play harmonica on the track "My Cherie Amour".

=== Donny & Marie in Las Vegas ===
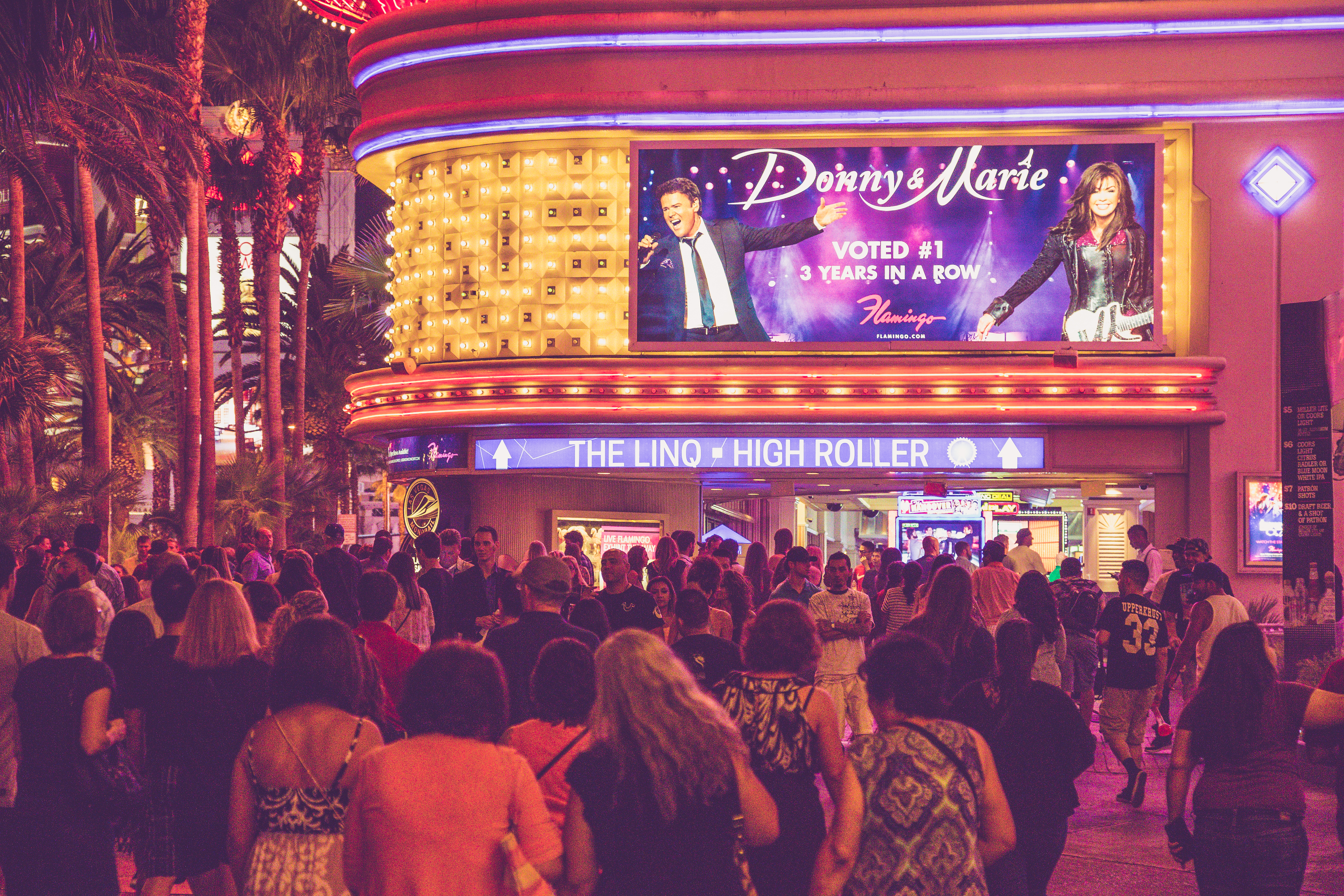
"Donny & Marie" marquee at the Flamingo Las Vegas

Following Marie's stint on Dancing with the Stars in 2007, the pair reunited at MGM Grand's Hollywood Theatre in Las Vegas for eight performances, July 17 – 23, 2008. It was their first Las Vegas run since 1979. The show's success led to a limited six-week engagement at the 750-seat showroom at the Flamingo Hotel. The residency began in September 2008 but proved so successful that it was ultimately extended for an 11-year run totaling 1,730 performances through November 9, 2019. "Donny & Marie" was a 90-minute show in which they sang together at the beginning and end of the show and performed solo segments in between. The singing siblings were backed by eight dancers and a nine-piece band. The Flamingo Showroom was updated in 2014 and renamed the Donny & Marie Showroom. It reverted to its old name after their show closed. The last song they performed together there was "May Tomorrow Be a Perfect Day."

Osmond and the show earned three of the Las Vegas Review-Journal's Best of Las Vegas Awards in 2012 including "Best Show", "Best All-Around Performer" (Donny & Marie), and "Best Singer". Osmond earned "Best Singer" for a second time in the Las Vegas Review-Journal's Best of Las Vegas Awards in 2013.

== Film, radio and television ==
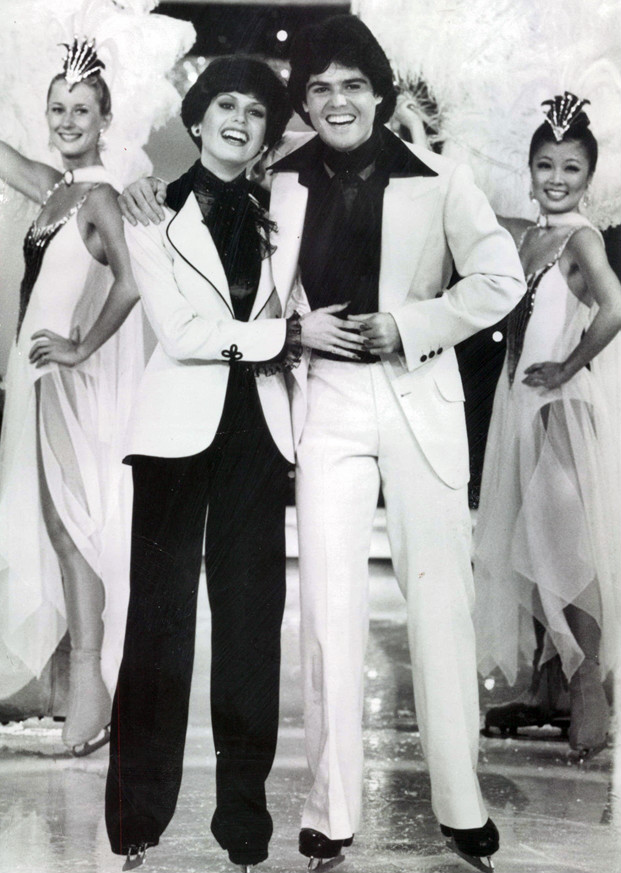
Osmond with Marie Osmond in 1977

=== Donny & Marie ===
After Osmond and his sister, Marie, co-hosted The Mike Douglas Show for a week in 1974, ABC's entertainment chief Fred Silverman offered them a show of their own, The Donny & Marie Show, a television variety series which aired on ABC from 1976 to 1979. In honor of their impact on American pop culture, Donny and Marie received the Pop Culture Award at the 2015 TV Land Awards. In the past, Osmond has expressed regret that the show was canceled, and that he and Marie were unable to decide when to end the show.

Donny and Marie also co-hosted the eponymous and syndicated talk show Donny & Marie from 1998 to 2000. They would occasionally perform with musical guests. Though they received back-to-back nominations for the Daytime Emmy Award for Outstanding Talk Show Host in 2000 and 2001, the show was canceled.

=== Other hosting ===
For two seasons in the US, Osmond hosted Pyramid (2002–2004), a syndicated version of the Dick Clark-hosted television game show. He reprised hosting for a British version of Pyramid on Challenge in 2007. For his performance on Pyramid, Osmond was nominated for a Daytime Emmy Award for Outstanding Game Show Host in 2003; the award went to Alex Trebek.

Osmond is one of two game show hosts to host two different versions of the same game show in different countries; the other being Howie Mandel for the American and Canadian versions of Deal or No Deal.

Osmond returned to ABC as host of The Great American Dream Vote, a primetime reality-game show that debuted in March 2007. After earning lackluster ratings in its first two episodes, the program was canceled.

Osmond hosted the daytime British version of the game show Identity on BBC Two in 2007.

On April 11, 2008, he hosted the 2008 Miss USA Pageant in Las Vegas with his sister, Marie.

He appeared on Entertainment Tonight as a commentator covering the ABC show Dancing with the Stars during his sister Marie's run as a contestant on the 5th season of the American version of the show in 2007.

=== Music ===
Osmond is mentioned in the lyrics of Alice Cooper's song "Department of Youth" on the album Welcome to My Nightmare. As the song fades, Cooper can be heard asking the youth choir backing him up, "Who's got the power?" to which a crowd of young people screams "We do!" After a couple of repetitions, this changes to "We've got the power" with a cheering response. On the final repetition, Cooper changes the question to "...and who gave it to you?" The crowd answers, "Donny Osmond!" Cooper then responds "What?!"

Osmond is featured in the song "Start the Par-dee" with Lil Yachty, written as a promotion for Chef Boyardee's throwback recipe ravioli. His most iconic line is "My name is Donny O, and you know I love my ravio's".

=== Film and television ===
In the animated television series Johnny Bravo, Osmond voiced himself as a recurring character.

He has done guest spots on numerous television shows such as Friends, Diagnosis: Murder, and Hannah Montana.

He appeared in a Pepsi Twist commercial during the Super Bowl with his sister, Marie, and Ozzy and Sharon Osbourne.

In 1978, he appeared in Goin' Coconuts with sister Marie. His future wife Debbie (credited as Debbie Glenn) made a cameo appearance at the end of the film.

In 1982, he co-starred with Priscilla Barnes and Joan Collins in the television movie The Wild Women of Chastity Gulch for Aaron Spelling.

In 1985, he appeared in a cameo role impersonating himself on Jeff Beck's video for the track "Ambitious", written by Nile Rodgers.

In 1998, Osmond was chosen as the singing voice of Shang in Disney's Mulan. He sang "I'll Make a Man Out of You".

In 1999, he starred as Joseph in the movie version of Joseph and the Amazing Technicolor Dreamcoat by Andrew Lloyd Webber's request who said, "to me, there is no better selection."

In 2002, he sang "No One Has to Be Alone" for the end credits of The Land Before Time IX: Journey to Big Water.

In the Bob the Builder special "Built to be Wild", he played Jackaroo the pickup truck.

Osmond remarked in an interview that his movie appearance on College Road Trip and upcoming appearances on two Disney Channel shows would mean that he would be coming full circle since he and his family were discovered by Walt Disney.

Osmond appears in the music video of "Weird Al" Yankovic's song "White & Nerdy". The song is a parody of Chamillionaire's "Ridin'"; Osmond's role is analogous to that of Krayzie Bone's role in the original video. Yankovic asked Osmond to appear because "if you have to have a white and nerdy icon in your video, like who else do you go for?"

In February 2019, he was revealed to have portrayed "Peacock" on the first season of The Masked Singer, where he was the runner-up.

Osmond was a guest on Kevin Nealon's web series on YouTube, Hiking with Kevin, in March 2019. The webisode begins with the two hiking through the snow at the Sundance Resort in Utah, and ends with them walking a crowded Las Vegas Strip until Osmond brings Nealon backstage at the Donny & Marie Showroom in the Flamingo Hotel, at which he was to perform that evening.

In 2020, Osmond was invited as a celebrity panelist for Fox's I Can See Your Voice, appearing on episode 5 in the first season of the show (4 November).

Osmond is mentioned in a comedic exchange in the third episode of HBO's miniseries The Night Of (2016). Two lawyers played by John Turturro and Jeannie Berlin fail to recall whether Osmond does or does not have a criminal history.

=== Dancing with the Stars ===
Osmond and professional Kym Johnson were paired for the ninth season of Dancing with the Stars. He participated in the show to prove he was a better dancer than his sister, Marie, who made it to the finals of season 5. For the first week, Donny and his partner were assigned to perform a foxtrot and a 30-second salsa. His foxtrot was said to be "too theatrical" and was scored 20/30 by the judges, however he managed to maintain a good score when his salsa scored 10 points. He performed a jive the following week, which was guest-judged by Baz Luhrmann. He scored 25 and was scored second place, called first to be safe. That following week he performed a rumba and scored 21.

The following week introduced four new dances including the Charleston, for which he scored 24. That following week, the two performed an Argentine tango. The couple scored 29/30, which was the highest-scored dance to date until it was beaten by then-top scorer and future runner-up Mýa and her 70s-themed samba. Donny also received that week's encore.

Following that week, Osmond and Johnson danced a train-station-themed jitterbug and scored a 24. He then performed a mambo against all couples and was eliminated 6th, receiving seven points for a total of 31/40. The following week, he performed a quickstep, which he quotes "was one of the worst moments of my life" and scored 24 and a team tango along with Joanna Krupa and Kelly Osbourne and received 28/30 and the encore.

In the 8th week of competition, Osmond was required to dance a ballroom and decade-themed Latin dance. His ballroom Viennese waltz received 26 but his 1980s themed pasodoble received 24 being quoted by judge Len Goodman as "the scariest, bizarre pasodoble we've ever seen" being awarded the last place on the judges' leaderboard for the first time. Following that week, he danced a tango and got advice from past runner-up Gilles Marini. He got tangled in Johnson's dress and received 21 saying the cause was that "I saw Marie." He then danced the samba to a song originally recorded by his brothers and himself called "One Bad Apple", receiving 26 and a Jitterbug scored 27. He once again was scored last place.

For the finals week, he danced a cha-cha-cha (27), a megamix dance alongside Mya and Kelly Osbourne (28), the only perfect-scoring freestyle (30) and a repeat of his Argentine tango (30) and won the competition, making him the oldest winner. As he accepted his trophy, he hugged fellow finalist Mya and brought his wife, Debbie, and sister, Marie, on stage.

On season 18, he guest-judged week five on Disney Night. In October 2014, he guest judged on the British version of the show, Strictly Come Dancing, on week 3 (movie week) of the 12th series.

Week #	Dance/song	Judges' score			Result
Week #	Dance/song	Inaba	Goodman	Tonioli	Result
1	Foxtrot/"All that Jazz"; Salsa Relay/"Get Busy"	7 Awarded	6; 10	7 Points	Safe
2	Jive/"Secret Agent Man"	8	*9	8	Safe
3	Rumba/"Endless Love"	7	7	7	Safe
4	Charleston/"Put a Lid on It"	8	8	8	Safe
5	Argentine tango/"Tango a Pugliese"	10	9	10	Safe
6	Jitterbug/"Choo Choo Ch'Boogie"; Mambo Marathon/"Ran Kan Kan"	8 Awarded	8; 7	8 Points	Safe
7	Quickstep/"Sing, Sing, Sing"; Team tango/"You Give Love a Bad Name"	8; 9	8; 9	8; 10	Safe
8	Viennese Waltz/"You Don't Know Me"; Pasodoble/"You Spin Me Round (Like a Record)"	9; 8	8; 8	9; 8	Safe
9 Semi-finals	Tango/"Black and Gold"; Samba/"One Bad Apple"; Jitterbug/"Jump Shout Boogie"	7; 8; 9	7; 9; 9	7; 9; 9	Safe
10; Finals	Cha-cha-cha/"September"; Megamix/"You and Me"/ "Whenever, Wherever" / "Maniac"; Freestyle/"Back in Business"; Argentine Tango/"Tango a Pugliese"	9 Awarded; 10; Awarded	9; 28; 10; 30	9 Points; 10; Points	Winner

== Musical theater ==
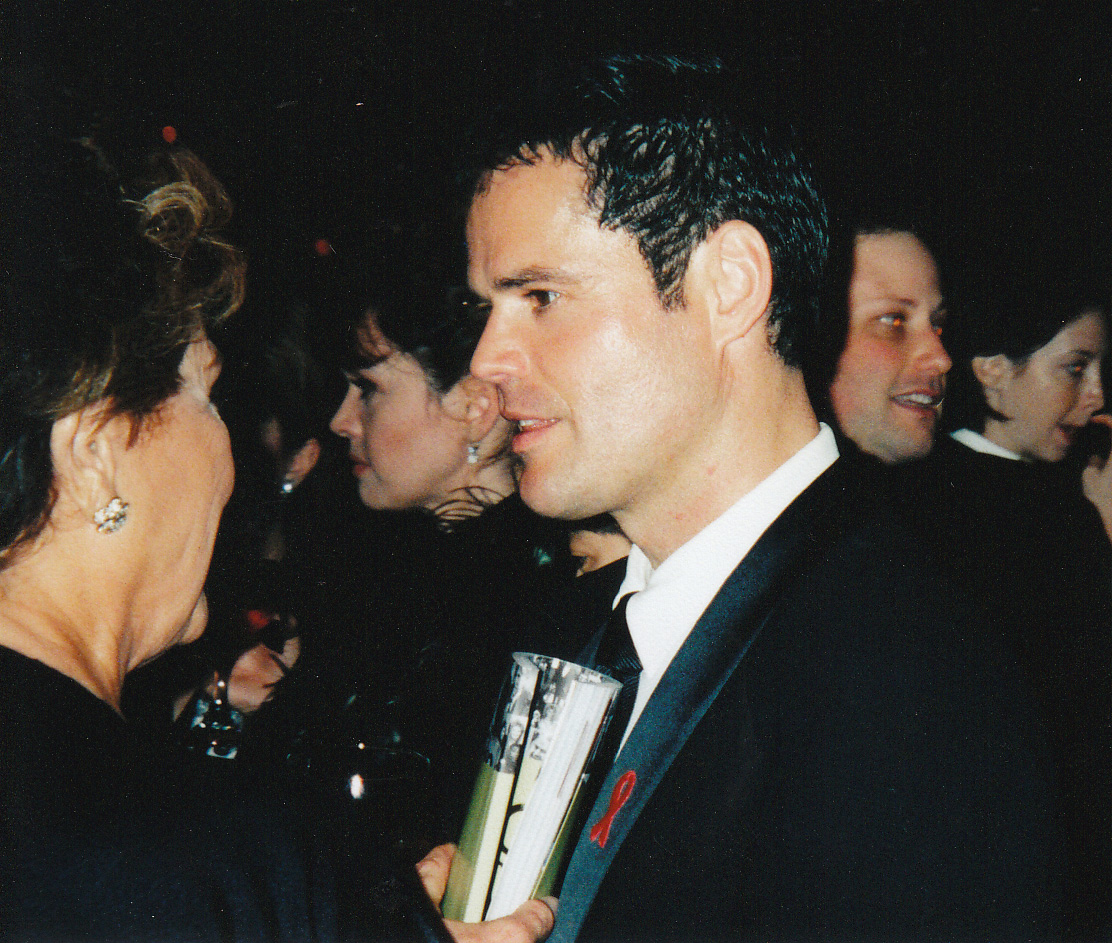
Osmond in 1998

His first foray into Broadway musical theater was the lead role in a revival of the 1904 George M. Cohan show Little Johnny Jones. Osmond replaced another former teen idol, David Cassidy, who left the show while it was on its pre-Broadway tour. After 29 previews and only one performance, the show closed in March 1982.

Osmond performed musical theater through much of the 1990s when he starred as Joseph in Joseph and the Amazing Technicolor Dreamcoat for over 2,000 performances beginning in July 1992 in the Elgin Theatre's Toronto production. He relocated to Chicago where Joseph played for 16 months in 1993–94. Osmond suffered from social anxiety disorder during his performances for the musical, which caused him to feel light-headed and extremely nervous during his performances. In 1997, Osmond left his starring role in the tour to participate with his family in the cast of the Hill Cumorah Pageant, eventually being succeeded by his own nephew David Osmond. Creator Andrew Lloyd Webber later chose Donny Osmond to star in the 1999 film version.

He returned to Broadway on 19 September 2006 as Gaston in Disney's Beauty and the Beast. He was scheduled to perform for nine weeks, but due to popular demand, he extended his run through December. Liz Smith of the New York Post wrote, "I am here to tell you he is charmingly campy, good-looking and grand as the villain 'Gaston', patterned after our old friend Elvis", and noting "Donny is divine". On 29 July 2007, Osmond played Gaston again for the final performance of Beauty and the Beast.

Osmond and his sister, Marie, starred in a holiday production called Donny & Marie – A Broadway Christmas, originally scheduled to play on Broadway at the Marquis Theatre 9–19 December 2010. The show was extended through December 2010 and again until 2 January 2011. Donny & Marie – Christmas in Chicago played at the Ford Center for the Performing Arts Oriental Theatre in Chicago in December 2011. It was similar to the 2010 Broadway show. In December 2014, they again performed in a similar Broadway show, receiving very positive reviews.

Osmond is set to play the role of Pharaoh, in the upcoming production of Joseph and the Amazing Technicolor Dreamcoat for a limited run over Christmas 2024 at the Edinburgh Playhouse opening on 3 December 2024 as part of the UK Tour going into 2025.

== Other ventures ==
=== Donny Osmond Home ===
Donny Osmond Home is a furniture and decor accessories collection, established in 2013 by Osmond and his wife Debbie, in collaboration with decor manufacturers.

=== Author ===
Life is Just What You Make It: My Story So Far, his autobiography co-written with Patricia Romanowski, is a "tell-all", Donny Osmond style. The book, released in 1999, includes stories from behind-the-scenes as a teen star, to his thought of tarnishing his "goody-two-shoes" image as he started his solo career, to him describing the intense panic attacks he suffered on stage.

=== Electronics and technology ===
Osmond's love for technology started very early in his life. Between rehearsals, homeschooling and homework, he spent his limited time off reading about electronics and the ways things work. He was reading manuals, building electronic kits, and using a soldering gun on his family's console and Ampex tape machines, and learning the tricks of sound engineering from people such as Ed Greene by around the age of ten.

He turned his bedroom into a studio, by putting his bed on a lift that would pull it to the ceiling when not in use, so he could work on his kits. He also installed a console, waiting for the engineer to be available, and when the engineer checked on the install, he only fixed a couple of errors, impressed by Osmond's work (he was 14 at the time).

Regarding the 1976 Donny and Marie Show, he was also involved in audio. When Osmond insisted that the show's audio be recorded in multitrack, the producers balked. After the economic disaster that ended in the closure of Osmond Studios, Osmond spent a lot of time gathering the lost tapes that archived the show's episodes, finding them all around the country, from un-protected storage units, to Brigham Young University. Then, there was the problem of tape deterioration. He investigated ways on how to stop or slow the deterioration, and asked people such as AMPEX's George LaForgia and Capitol Records's Paula Salvatore. He found out that baking the tapes could slow deterioration enough to transfer them to another media. So he bought a beef jerky drying oven and installed a 220 V current to run it, after learning the stratospheric cost of doing it professionally. Then, he got his set of Yamaha 2400, his laptop, and got to work, all to transfer the episodes to DVD (which he started selling in 2006).

Osmond has continued to use technology, not only in his recordings, but also adapting it to his show. Regarding the use of digital audio workstations, Osmond recalled their origin in the 1980s: "... whether it be Pro Tools — I use Cubase — but everybody was afraid of it". He mentions that now, with the advent of A.I., it is happening again. "I love the prospects of AI. I love what it can do for me as a producer, as an artist — as a tool. And that's it", he said. For his 2025 show, he created an A.I./CGI version of himself at fourteen, using his grandson Daxton as frame for the avatar.

== Public image ==
Osmond states that he has had a tremendous public-image struggle since Donny & Marie ended in 1979. Reviews from Allmusic noted that while Osmond remained a gifted singer, a series of creative missteps in the late 1970s led to his virtually disappearing from the public eye during the 1980s. He was described in the 1980s as having an "unhip image", and he said he was embarrassed that the Osmond name was not considered cool. A publicist suggested that Osmond purposely plan an arrest for drug possession in order to change his image. "I remember hiring a publicist who figured out this whole campaign to get me busted for drugs and change my image."

Osmond commented on his opposition to same-sex marriage after the 2008 Proposition 8 in California. The LDS Church were one of many groups that supported Proposition 8 (to ban same-sex marriage), and Osmond stated that he opposes same-sex marriage but that he does not condemn homosexuality. He believes that homosexuals should be accepted in the LDS Church if they remain celibate. He stated on his website:

We all determine for ourselves what is right and what is not right for our own lives and how we live God's commandments. I am not a judge and I will never judge anyone for the decisions they make unless they are causing harm to another individual. I love my friends, including my homosexual friends. We are all God's children. It is their choice, not mine on how they conduct their lives and choose to live the commandments according to the dictates of their own conscience.

In March 2010, Osmond criticized Lady Gaga and Beyoncé for using profanity and sex in their "Telephone" video.

== Personal life ==
On May 8, 1978, Osmond married Debra Glenn of Billings, Montana, in the Salt Lake Temple. Glenn had been the girlfriend of Osmond's brother Jay Osmond before she married Donny. Together they have five sons: Don, Jeremy, Brandon, Chris, and Josh. The Osmonds became grandparents in 2005 and have 16 grandchildren. Chris, who is also a musician, appeared on season 2 of the American reality series Claim to Fame, in which contestants have to determine their competitors' famous relative; Chris advanced to the final episode, having repeatedly survived numerous eliminations because the other contestants could not guess Donny's identity.

Like the rest of his family, Osmond is a member of the LDS Church. In retrospect, he has written, "It would have been nice to be able to have served a regular full-time mission, but when I was of that age, my career was such that everyone, including my parents and the leaders of the church, thought that I could do a lot of good in the world by continuing to be in the public eye, by living an exemplary life and sharing my beliefs in every way that I could." He continues sharing his beliefs in an extensive letters-and-comments portion of his website.

Osmond's two oldest brothers, Virl and Tom, are deaf, his older brother Wayne later went deaf, and his nephew, Justin, is hearing impaired. He has talked about the experience of growing up with his brothers and their use of sign language when performing together.

My oldest brother was born 85 percent deaf and the next was born worse with almost total deafness. My parents were told by everyone, doctors included, to stop having kids. Thank God, they at least went as far as seven! Anyhow, they decided they were not going to treat my brothers differently [or lower their expectations]. My brothers talk and communicate verbally. They also sign and do have that down quite well. As a matter of fact, we used sign language when we were performing together as a group. There's this one number we did on the Donny and Marie Show, it was amazing—even when we were taping it. It was a huge production number and my brothers learned the routine. Obviously they couldn't really hear the music, but they could feel the beat and they'd watch us out of the corner of their eyes to make sure they were still in tempo.

Osmond has traced some of his family ancestry back to Merthyr Tydfil in Wales; his journey was documented in a BBC Wales program, Donny Osmond Coming Home. On the BBC's The One Show, a plaque was unveiled in the town to commemorate "the ancestors of Donny Osmond."

== Discography ==
=== Studio albums ===
- The Donny Osmond Album (1971)
- To You with Love, Donny (1971)
- Portrait of Donny (1972)
- Too Young (1972)
- Alone Together (1973)
- A Time for Us (1973)
- Donny (1974)
- Disco Train (1976)
- Donald Clark Osmond (1977)
- Donny Osmond (1989)
- Eyes Don't Lie (1990)
- Christmas at Home (1997)
- This Is the Moment (2001)
- Somewhere in Time (2002)
- What I Meant to Say (2004)
- Love Songs of the 70s (2007)
- The Soundtrack of My Life (2015)
- Start Again (2021)

== Filmography ==
=== Television ===
Year		Title	Role	Notes		Ref.
1963–1970		The Andy Williams Show	Himself	Guest	Multiple episodes (debuted at age 5, in 1963, in his first appearance)	
1972		Here's Lucy	Himself	Guest	Season 5 Episode 11	
1976–1979		Donny & Marie	Himself	host	78 episodes	
1980		The Love Boat	Danny Fields/Schofield	Guest	Season 3 Episodes 18, 19	
1982		The Love Boat	Jim Markham	Guest	Season 6 Episode 13	
1983		Disney Channel Launch Program	Himself	Host	Special program that included a countdown	
1995		Space Ghost Coast to Coast	Himself	Guest	Season 2 ep. 5 "Fire Drill"	
1997	UK	Osmond Family Values	Himself		Documentary	
1997–2000		Donny & Marie Talk Show	Himself	Co-host	All episodes	
1998, 2000		The King of Queens	Himself	Guest	Season 1 episode 10 Supermarket Story; Season 2, episode 17 Meet By-Product	
1998		Wheel of Fortune	Himself	Guest	With sister Marie. Episode 16.53	
1999	UK	The Osmonds are Back	Himself		5 Part TV Documentary UK Channel 5	
1999–2000		Miss America Pageant	Himself	Co-Host	With sister Marie	
1999		Diagnosis: Murder	Himself	Guest	Season 7 Episode 9: "The Mouth That Roared"	
2001		Fear Factor	Himself	Contestant	Season 2 Episode 1	
2001		Inside the Osmonds	Himself	Closing number performer	Made for TV movie	
2002–2004	US	Pyramid	Himself	Host	All episodes	
2007	UK	Pyramid	Himself	Host	All episodes	
2004		Friends	Himself	Pyramid host	Episode: "The One Where the Stripper Cries"	
2004		Sesame Street	Himself	guest	Commentary 35th Anniversary	
2007		The Great American Dream Vote	Himself	Host	2 episodes	
2007		Identity (UK)	Himself	Host	All episodes	
2007		Entertainment Tonight	Himself	Commentator	Several episodes	
2008		Hannah Montana	Himself	Cameo	Episode: "We're All on This Date Together"	
2008		Miss USA Pageant	Himself	Co-Host		
2008		Teleflora presents America's Favorite Mom	Himself	Co-host	Mother's Day special, with sister Marie.	
2009, 2012, 2014, 2017–2018		Dancing with the Stars	Himself	Contestant	Season 9 (winner)	
2009, 2012, 2014, 2017–2018		Dancing with the Stars	Himself	Guest performer	Seasons 15, 24, 27	
2009, 2012, 2014, 2017–2018		Dancing with the Stars	Himself	Guest judge	Season 18	
2014		Strictly Come Dancing	Himself	Guest judge	Series 12	
2019		The Masked Singer	Himself	Contestant (Peacock)	Runner-up, Season 1	
2022		The Masked Singer	Himself	Guest panelist	Season 8	
2019		Hiking with Kevin	Himself	Interview guest		
2020		Celebrity Wheel of Fortune	Himself	Contestant	Episode: "Donny Osmond, Jeff Garlin, and Amber Riley"	
2020		I Can See Your Voice	Himself	Guest celebrity panelist	Season 1, episode 5	
2023		Generation Gap	Himself	S2 E9: "Get outta My Dreams, Get Into My Fridge"		
2023		The Osmonds: Faith, Family, & Fame	Himself		Documentary Special	

=== Films ===
Year	Title	Role	Notes	Ref.
1978	Goin' Coconuts	Donny	Feature film	
1982	The Wild Women of Chastity Gulch	Frank Isaacs	Television film	
1999	Joseph & the Amazing Technicolor Dreamcoat	Joseph	Direct-to-video film produced by Andrew Lloyd Webber	
2008	College Road Trip	Doug Greenhut	Feature film	

=== Voice dubbing and animated films and programs ===
Year	Title	Role	Notes	Ref.
1972–1974	The Osmonds	himself	Saturday morning cartoon	
1997–2004	Johnny Bravo	himself	3 episodes	
1998	Mulan	Captain Li Shang	Singing voice ("I'll Make a Man Out of You")	
2005	Bob the Builder: Built to be Wild	Jackaroo	Direct-to-video film	
2009	Handy Manny	Farmer	Episode "Motorcycle adventure"	

=== Music videos ===
Year	Title	Role	Notes	Ref.
1985	Ambitious	Cameo	Jeff Beck music video	
2006	White & Nerdy	Dancer	"Weird Al" Yankovic music video parody of Chamillionaire's "Ridin'" feat. Krayzie Bone	

== Theater ==
Year	Title	Role	Notes	Ref.
1982	Little Johnny Jones	Johnny Jones	29 previews and 1 official performance	
1992–1994	Joseph and the Amazing Technicolor Dreamcoat	Joseph	Toronto and Chicago	
2006	Beauty and the Beast	Gaston	Broadway	
2007	Beauty and the Beast	Gaston	final Broadway performance	
2007	Cabaret show	Himself	Feinstein's at the Regency	
2010	Donny & Marie - A Broadway Christmas	Himself	Original production	
2024	Joseph and the Amazing Technicolor Dreamcoat	Pharaoh	Edinburgh	

== Commercial collaborations and ads ==
Year	Title	Notes	Ref.
2013	Donny Osmond Home	Furniture and accessories. Collaboration with different makers and retailers (such as Wayfair, Target, Home Depot, etc.)	
2018	American Greetings Birthday E-card	Customizable cards with a personalized song	
2018	Chef Boyardee "Start The Par-dee"	Collaboration with rapper Lil Yachty	

== Tours and residencies ==
=== Concert tours ===
- Soldier of Love Tour (1989)
- Eyes Don't Lie Tour (1991)
- This Is the Moment Tour (2001)
- Somewhere in Time Tour (2003)
- Crazy Horses Summer Tour (2027)

=== Concert residencies ===
- Donny & Marie at Flamingo Las Vegas (2008–2019)
- Donny Osmond at Harrah's Las Vegas (2021–2027)

Media offices
Preceded by Boomer Esiason and Meredith Vieira	Host of Miss America with Marie Osmond; 1999–2000	Succeeded by Tony Danza
Preceded by John Davidson	Host of Pyramid; 2002–2004	Succeeded by Mike Richards

Awards and achievements
Preceded by Shawn Johnson & Mark Ballas	Dancing with the Stars (US) winners Season 9 (Fall 2009 with Kym Johnson)	Succeeded by Nicole Scherzinger and Derek Hough
