= Jersey Boys (soundtrack) =

Jersey Boys (Music from the Motion Picture and Broadway Musical)

Soundtrack album / cast recording by various artists
- Released: June 24, 2014
- Genres: Musical theatre; film soundtrack
- Length: 61:33
- Label: Rhino Entertainment
- Producer: Bob Gaudio

Singles from Jersey Boys (Music from the Motion Picture and Broadway Musical)
- 1. "Cry For Me" Released: June 18, 2014

Jersey Boys (Music from the Motion Picture and Broadway Musical) is the soundtrack to the 2014 film Jersey Boys directed by Clint Eastwood, based on the Tony Award-winning Broadway musical of the same name. The album, released on June 24, 2014 by Rhino Entertainment, features a mix of original recordings by Frankie Valli & the Four Seasons, plus new recordings from the cast members and tracks from the original Broadway cast recording. The album was preceded by the single "Cry For Me".

== Background ==
In an interview to Collider, Eastwood claimed though he liked music of all kinds, such as jazz, pop he was not a fan of Frankie Valli and no idea on the music from the 1930s. However, he admired The Four Seasons' work and thought that their music was far superior and consisted mostly "energetic music". He admitted Valli's "Can't Take My Eyes Off You" was one of the "real classic songs of that era" and go down as one among any time in the history. Eastwood decided to record the singing and band performances live on set as he intended "to create seamless transitions in performance from one moment in the film to the next".

In an interview with The Hollywood Reporter, re-recording mixers John Reitz and Gregg Rudloff stated that the use of live vocals and music in Jersey Boys "raised the emotional performances in the scenes" and "only added to the realism." The music in the film involved four vocalists instead of solo performances, with the actors handing over a single microphone as they spoke and sang. In order to achieve the desired separation during the final mix, each actor and instrument was individually microphoned in post-production. Sound mixers Walt Martin and Tim Boot recorded the dialogue and vocals, respectively, while impulse response recordings were taken from various locations to replicate the ambiences of the venues. In post-production, the tracks were mixed by scoring mixer Bobby Fernandez, who worked with music editors Chris McGeary and Tommy Lockett. Supervising music editors Alan Murray and Bub Asman recorded various effects that were used in the final mix.

== Reception ==
Writing for Renowned for Sound, Angus Fitz-Bugden commented "While it's a little difficult to adequately review a motion picture soundtrack when it's divorced from the plot of the film/theater show itself, as a standalone collection, the Jersey Boys soundtrack serves as a pretty great introduction to one of popular music's greatest entities as performed by the group themselves and those who cherish their legacy." Tony Peters of Icon Fetch wrote "By giving some of the songs a modern sound and placing them alongside classic material, the Jersey Boys Soundtrack makes for an exciting listen. It may make you delve a little deeper into the history of one of the greatest vocal groups of all-time." Despite the film's mixed reception, Claudia Puig of USA Today commented that "the infectious songs sound essentially identical to the way The Four Seasons sang them" providing an "aurally nostalgic experience". Richard Corliss of Time complimented the music as "sharp" and "glorious". Richard Lawson of Vanity Fair wrote "The music sounds great and can still get a toe tapping". David Edelstein of Vulture wrote "the songs and their harmonies are evergreen".

== Track listing ==
No.	Title	Performers	Length
1.	"Paris 2000"		0:18
2.	"December, 1963 (Oh, What a Night)"	Frankie Valli and The Four Seasons	3:13
3.	"My Mother's Eyes"	Frankie Valli	1:58
4.	"I Can't Give You Anything But Love"	John Lloyd Young	1:05
5.	"A Sunday Kind of Love"	John Lloyd Young, Frankie Valli and The Four Seasons	1:55
6.	"Moody Mood's For Love"	John Lloyd Young	1:35
7.	"Cry For Me"	Erich Bergen	2:24
8.	"Sherry"	John Lloyd Young	2:06
9.	"Big Girls Don't Cry"	John Lloyd Young	2:19
10.	"Walk Like A Man"	John Lloyd Young	1:55
11.	"My Boyfriend's Back"	Kimmy Gatewood, Kyli Rae, Jackie Seiden	1:41
12.	"My Eyes Adored You"	John Lloyd Young	2:27
13.	"Dawn (Go Away)"	John Lloyd Young	2:39
14.	"Big Man in Town"	John Lloyd Young	2:19
15.	"Beggin'"	Frankie Valli and The Four Seasons, Ryan Molloy, John Lloyd Young	3:21
16.	"Medley("Stay"/"Let's Hang On! (To What We've Got)"/"Opus 17 (Don't You Worry 'bout Me)"/"Bye Bye Baby")"	John Lloyd Young	4:53
17.	"C'Mon Marianne"	John Lloyd Young	1:16
18.	"Can't Take My Eyes Off You"	John Lloyd Young	3.23
19.	"Working My Way Back to You"	John Lloyd Young	1:48
20.	"Fallen Angel"	Frankie Valli	3.57
21.	"Who Loves You"	Frankie Valli and The Four Seasons, John Lloyd Young	4:20
22.	"Closing Credits "Sherry/December 1963, Oh What A Night Finale"	John Lloyd Young, Erich Bergen, Michael Lomenda, Vincent Piazza	2:22
23.	"Sherry"	Frankie Valli and The Four Seasons	1:29
24.	"Dawn (Go Away)"	Frankie Valli and The Four Seasons	1:29
25.	"Rag Doll"	Frankie Valli and The Four Seasons	1:29

== Chart performance ==
=== Weekly charts ===
Chart (2014)	Peak position
Australian Albums (ARIA)	9
Italian Compilation Albums Chart	60
New Zealand Albums (RMNZ)	5
Spanish Albums (Promusicae)	84
UK Compilation Albums (OCC)	32
UK Soundtrack Albums (OCC)	4
US Billboard 200	15
US Current Album Sales (Billboard)	15
US Soundtrack Albums (Billboard)	2

=== Year-end charts ===
Chart (2014)	Position
US Soundtrack Albums (Billboard)	9

Chart (2015)	Position
US Soundtrack Albums (Billboard)	23

== Certifications ==
Region	Certification	Certified units/sales
Australia (ARIA)	Platinum	70,000^{^}
^{^} Shipments figures based on certification alone.
