= Jersey Boys: Original Broadway Cast Recording =

Jersey Boys

Cast recording by various artists
- Released: November 1, 2005
- Label: Rhino
- Producer: Bob Gaudio

Professional ratings
Review scores
Source	Rating
About.com	5/5 stars
Allmusic	3.5/5 stars

Jersey Boys: Original Broadway Cast Recording is the cast album for the 2005 Broadway musical Jersey Boys, which tells the story of Frankie Valli and The Four Seasons. The album was produced by Bob Gaudio, one of the original members of the Four Seasons. Principal vocalists include original Broadway cast members Christian Hoff as Tommy DeVito, Daniel Reichard as Bob Gaudio, J. Robert Spencer as Nick Massi and John Lloyd Young as Frankie Valli.

It was released November 1, 2005 by Rhino Entertainment and reached number eighty-five on the Billboard 200. In 2006 the album won a Grammy for Best Musical Show Album. In February 2008, the album was certified Gold by the RIAA, and in September 2009, was certified Platinum.

== Track listing ==
1. "Ces soirées-là" – 1:16
2. "The Early Years: A Scrapbook" – 8:09
3. "Cry for Me" – 2:23
4. "Backup Sessions" – 1:44
5. "Sherry" – 2:14
6. "Big Girls Don't Cry" – 2:17
7. "Walk Like a Man" – 1:52
8. "December, 1963 (Oh, What a Night)" – 2:28
9. "My Boyfriend's Back" – 1:32
10. "My Eyes Adored You" – 2:26
11. "Dawn (Go Away)" – 2:38
12. "Big Man in Town" – 2:05
13. "Dialogue: A Little Trouble" – 0:17
14. "Beggin'" – 2:50
15. "Dialogue: See How You Handle It" – 0:15
16. "Medley: Stay/ Let's Hang On!/ Opus 17 (Don't You Worry 'bout Me) / Bye, Bye, Baby (Baby Goodbye)" – 4:39
17. "C'mon Marianne" – 1:16
18. "Can't Take My Eyes Off You" – 3:17
19. "Working My Way Back to You" – 1:48
20. "Fallen Angel" – 2:06
21. "Rag Doll" – 2:14
22. "Who Loves You" – 2:55

== Certifications ==
Region	Certification	Certified units/sales
Australia (ARIA)	Platinum	70,000^{^}
United States (RIAA)	Platinum	1,000,000^{^}
^{^} Shipments figures based on certification alone.
