= Jersey Boys (film) =

2014 American film by Clint Eastwood

- Theatrical release poster
- Directed by: Clint Eastwood
- Screenplay by: Marshall Brickman; Rick Elice
- Based on: Jersey Boys by Marshall Brickman; Rick Elice
- Produced by: Clint Eastwood; Graham King; Robert Lorenz
- Starring: John Lloyd Young; Erich Bergen; Michael Lomenda; Vincent Piazza; Christopher Walken
- Cinematography: Tom Stern
- Edited by: Joel Cox; Gary D. Roach
- Music by: Bob Gaudio
- Production companies: RatPac-Dune Entertainment; GK Films; Malpaso Productions
- Distributed by: Warner Bros. Pictures
- Release dates: June 5, 2014 (Sydney Film Festival); June 20, 2014 (United States)
- Running time: 134 minutes
- Country: United States
- Language: English
- Budget: $40–58.6 million
- Box office: $67.6 million

Jersey Boys is a 2014 American biographical musical drama film directed and produced by Clint Eastwood, based on the 2004 Tony Award-winning jukebox musical of the same name. The film tells the story of the musical group The Four Seasons. Original band members Frankie Valli and Bob Gaudio (who also composed the film's music) were executive producers.

Jersey Boys was released by Warner Bros. Pictures in the United States on June 20, 2014. It received mixed reviews from critics, who praised the musical numbers but criticized the narrative and runtime, and grossed $67 million worldwide.

== Plot ==
In Belleville, New Jersey in 1951, Tommy DeVito performs together with his brother Nicky, and their friend Nick Massi, as The Variety Trio. He meets 16-year-old Frankie Castelluccio, a barber's son, already well known in the neighborhood for his singing voice. Frankie has the admiration of Genovese Family mobster Angelo "Gyp" DeCarlo, who takes a personal interest in him.

One night, the group attempts a robbery of a safe, resulting in the police later arresting them. In court, Frankie is let off with a slap on the wrist, while Tommy is sentenced to six months in prison. After his release, Tommy reunites with the group, and adds Frankie as lead singer. Frankie changes his professional name to Frankie Vally, and then Frankie Valli. At a performance, Frankie is entranced by a woman named Mary Delgado. He takes her to dinner, and they are soon married.

The group, now called "The Four Lovers", is in need of a songwriter after Nicky leaves. Tommy's friend, Joe Pesci, tells him about a talented singer-songwriter, Bob Gaudio, and invites him to hear the group perform. Gaudio is impressed with Valli's vocals, and agrees to join.

The band, having recorded several demos, attempts to attract interest, but has little success. One day, in New York City, producer Bob Crewe signs them to a contract. However, they quickly realize that it only allows them to perform back-up vocals for other acts. Crewe says that the group does not have a distinctive image or sound yet. Inspired by a bowling alley sign, the band is renamed "The Four Seasons," and they sing a new song Gaudio has written, "Sherry", to Crewe, who agrees to record it.

"Sherry" quickly becomes a commercial success, followed by two more, "Big Girls Don't Cry" and "Walk Like a Man". However, before an appearance on The Ed Sullivan Show, Valli is approached by mobster Norman Waxman, a loan shark for one of the other Five Families, who claims that Tommy owes him $150,000. Frankie goes to DeCarlo, who gets Waxman to allow the group to pay the debt, which turns out to be considerably larger. Tommy must go to work for the mob's associates in Las Vegas until it is paid. Nick, irritated by Tommy's irresponsibility, not being involved in the group's decisions, and never being able to see his family, also leaves the group.

Having to tour constantly to pay off the debt, the band hires a set of studio musicians, and becomes Frankie Valli and the Four Seasons, with Gaudio now acting solely as songwriter and producer. Valli learns from his now ex-wife, Mary, that his daughter, Francine, now a drug addict, has escaped from home. Valli meets his estranged daughter and regrets not acting as a better father for her when she was growing up. He also arranges for Gaudio to offer her singing lessons and for Crewe to cut a demo for her.

A few years later, the group has finally paid off Tommy's debt. However, this coincides with the news of Francine's death by drug overdose. Frankie and Mary both grieve for their daughter. Gaudio composes a new number for Valli to sing, his first as a solo artist. At first, Frankie is hesitant, as he is still in mourning, but eventually agrees. The track, "Can't Take My Eyes Off You", becomes a commercial success.

In 1990, the Four Seasons are about to be inducted into the Rock and Roll Hall of Fame. The band performs "Rag Doll" onstage, their first performance together in over twenty years. The music fades as the four men take turns addressing the audience. Tommy, in an ironic twist, now works for Joe Pesci, who has gone on to become an Oscar-winning actor (his award-winning role was a fictionalized account of another real-life gangster coincidentally also named Tommy DeVito). Nick claims to have no regrets about leaving the group, enjoying the time he spends with his family. Frankie is still touring through his solo career, but yearns for the days he performed with the rest. Bob has retired to Nashville, Tennessee. Frankie states that the best time he had during his time with the Four Seasons was before their success, "four guys under a streetlamp, when it was all still ahead of us."

== Cast ==
- John Lloyd Young as Francis "Frankie" Castelluccio/Valli
- Erich Bergen as Bob Gaudio
- Michael Lomenda as Nick Massi
- Vincent Piazza as Gaetano "Tommy" DeVito
- Christopher Walken as Gyp DeCarlo
- Renée Marino as Mary Delgado
- Kathrine Narducci as Mary Rinaldi
- Lou Volpe as Anthony Castelluccio
- Freya Tingley as Francine Valli (age 17)
  - Elizabeth Hunter as Francine Valli (age 7)
  - Grace Kelley as Francine Valli (age 4)
- Mike Doyle as Bob Crewe
- Rob Marnell as Joe Long
- Johnny Cannizzaro as Nick DeVito
- Donnie Kehr as Norm Waxman
- Jeremy Luke as Donnie
- Joey Russo as Joe Pesci
- Steve Monroe as Barry Belson
- James Madio as Stosh
- Erica Piccininni as Lorraine
- Steve Schirripa as Vito
- Barry Livingston as Accountant
- Miles Aubrey as Charles Calello
- Troy Grant as Ed Sullivan
- Billy Gardell as Georgie
- Francesca Eastwood as Waitress

== Production ==
In 2010, GK Films acquired the rights to produce a film adaptation of the musical, with Brickman and Elice writing the script for the film. By August 2012, Jon Favreau was engaged to direct and casting had begun.

However, in November 2012, it was reported that Warner Bros. Pictures had put the film in turnaround; Despite this in May 2013, Frankie Valli noted that production was still underway. By that June, Eastwood became attached to the project as a director. The project came three years after the release of Eastwood's previous film, J. Edgar, which Variety notes was "his longest gap between directing projects since 1980". Although Eastwood enjoyed the script, he asked for a rewrite, noting that the version "was missing a lot of things." This was considered unusual for Eastwood as he became somewhat notorious for using first drafts as the eventual script. A trailer was released for the film on April 17, 2014.

For casting, Eastwood sought to cast actors from the play itself rather than more marketable film stars. Eastwood noted that he was pressured to cast more famous leads; however, he refused, stating, "You've got people who've done 1,200 performances; how much better can you know a character?". In the narrow selection to play Valli, between Broadway's John Lloyd Young and West End's Ryan Molloy, Young was chosen. Valli's personal favorite was Molloy. Massi's son Nick Massi Jr. expressed interest in playing his father, but was not seriously considered in part because of past incidents in which he had attempted to scalp tickets at Jersey Boys stage shows and caused backstage disruption.

The film was shot in Los Angeles, California, where it spent $58.6 million and received the California Film & Television Tax Credit.

== Musical numbers ==
Includes all the songs sung in the film.

- "Silhouettes" - Frankie Valli
- "You're the Apple of My Eye"– Variety Trio
- "I Can't Give You Anything but Love" – Frankie Valli and Variety Trio
- "Earth Angel" – Tommy DeVito
- "A Sunday Kind of Love" – Frankie Valli, Nick Massi, Nick's date and Tommy DeVito
- "My Mother's Eyes" - Frankie Valli (also with Gyp DeCarlo in the opening)
- "I'm in the Mood for Love" – Frankie Valli
- "Cry for Me" – Bob Gaudio, Frankie Valli, Tommy DeVito and Nick Massi
- "I Still Care" – Miss Frankie Nolan and The Romans
- "Trance" – Billy Dixon and The Topix
- "Sherry" – The Four Seasons
- "Big Girls Don't Cry" – The Four Seasons
- "Walk Like a Man" – The Four Seasons
- "My Boyfriend's Back" – The Angels
- "My Eyes Adored You" – Frankie Valli
- "Working My Way Back to You" – The Four Seasons
- "Dawn (Go Away)" – The Four Seasons
- "Opus 17 (Don't You Worry 'bout Me)" – Frankie Valli and The New Seasons
- "Can't Take My Eyes Off You" – Frankie Valli
- "Rag Doll" – The Four Seasons
- "Who Loves You" – The Four Seasons
- "Sherry"/"December, 1963 (Oh, What a Night) - (Reprise)" - Frankie Valli, Tommy DeVito, Bob Gaudio, Nick Massi and Full Cast

=== Background songs ===
Includes songs heard only on the background.

- "(Who Wears) Short Shorts" – The Royal Teens
- "Stay" – Frankie Valli and The Four Seasons
- "Bye Bye Baby" – Frankie Valli and The Four Seasons

== Historical accuracy ==
While Valli's daughter Francine did eventually die of a reported drug overdose, it occurred in 1980. This was 13 years after Valli recorded "Can't Take My Eyes Off You," which in turn was recorded six years before the Four Seasons paid off their debts in 1973. Gaudio acknowledged that the narrative in Jersey Boys juxtaposes two different timelines, hence why Francine's age jumps from a child to a teenager to a young adult at the time of her death.

While Valli, Gaudio, and DeVito were arrested in Ohio in 1965, it did not occur in Cleveland as the film suggests, but at the Ohio State Fair in Columbus. Brickman and Elice moved the arrest to Cleveland as artistic license, tying the event that began the group's fall from grace to their reunion at the Hall of Fame 25 years later.

Some of the film's details regarding DeVito's life- such as his hygiene, inspiration for Joe Pesci's Goodfellas character named Tommy Devito, and reason for leaving The Four Seasons- were inaccurate. DeVito himself denied virtually all of the claims made by Nick Massi in the film (and musical) about Tommy's underwear habits, towel usage, and an incident where he allegedly urinated in the sink, saying "I was probably the cleanest guy there." DeVito had also previously claimed he in fact left the Four Seasons on his own free will. Contrary to the film's suggestion that he was forced out by the Mafia, DeVito blamed things such as excessive travel and changing clothes three times a day (a line included in Massi's rant) for his departure. Brickman and Elice insisted that DeCarlo had made the suggestion that DeVito not resettle in New Jersey after his buyout.

A scene in the film implies that The Four Seasons and The Angels toured together, which included extramarital affairs between the two groups' members. Peggy Santiglia, the Angels' lead singer and an occasional collaborator with Bob Gaudio, remarked that the portrayal was a realistic one but that, to her recollection, the two groups never actually toured together; the two groups, both being from New Jersey, were mutual friends who usually broke bread together outside of their touring schedules.

Nick Massi, while he had occasionally played with DeVito and Valli in the early 1950s, was not a permanent member of the group that became the Four Seasons until after Gaudio joined in 1960; he also left well before DeVito, spending only five years in the group (not the ten claimed in the film), before the State Fair arrest. Furthermore, replacements Charles Calello and Joe Long were never in the band at the same time (Calello only briefly joined to fulfill an album commitment and select tour dates before Long joined permanently); in contrast, DeVito and Long were together in the band for several years, with their on-stage chemistry forming a key part of the group's stage act, as opposed to the Jersey Boys storyline portraying Long as replacing DeVito after his departure. In real life, Demetri Callas (who, unlike the others, was a Greek-American from Maryland with previous connections to New Jersey) became the group's guitarist after DeVito resigned in 1970. The film and musical also understated the amount of debt that DeVito had saddled the band with in the late 1960s; the $662,000 to $1,000,000 number cited in the script was actually closer to $2,000,000.

The character of Barry Belson, who appears in only one scene giving the group its breakthrough radio airplay, was based on Joey Reynolds, who had introduced "Sherry" while working at WPOP in Hartford, Connecticut. Reynolds "deeply resent(ed)" being replaced by the fictional Belson in the film and musical.

== Soundtrack ==
A soundtrack album Jersey Boys (Music from the Motion Picture and Broadway Musical) was released on June 24, 2014. The albums is a mix of original recordings by Frankie Valli & The Four Seasons, new recordings by the film cast, and tracks from the original Broadway cast recording.

== Reception ==
=== Critical response ===
On review aggregator website Rotten Tomatoes, the film holds an approval rating of 51% based on 219 reviews, with an average rating of 5.9/10. The site's critics consensus reads: "Jersey Boys is neither as inventive nor as energetic as it could be, but there's no denying the powerful pleasures of its musical moments." On Metacritic, the film has a weighted average score of 54 out of 100, based on 44 critics, indicating "mixed or average" reviews. On CinemaScore, audiences gave the film an average grade of "A−" on an A+ to F scale.

Richard Roeper gave the film a "C+" grade, stating that at times the film "captures the electric excitement of the musical, but for every soaring moment, there are 10 minutes of bickering or brooding". Andrew Barker of Variety felt that "Christopher Walken creates most of the film’s laughs by simple virtue of being Christopher Walken, but his doddering don screams out for a bigger, broader performance."

In a 2015 interview with Daily Express, Valli criticized that "they took the music out of the movie. That bothered me. I was supposed to be involved in post production but it didn’t happen. I'd have liked more of the movie to be shot in New Jersey, not in studios. They could have cast it differently. There were lots of disagreements. Was it Eastwood's fault? Well, he was the director. If it were me making a movie about real people and the real people were there, I'd be asking them questions. It wasn't a bad movie but it could have been better". In a 2021 interview with The Washington Post, Valli once again revealed his thoughts on the movie, saying that "I don’t think it was cast properly and I don’t think it was done properly. The whole entity was not put together properly. I think Clint Eastwood is a great director and actor. I don’t think this was right for him."

=== Home media ===
Jersey Boys was released on DVD and Blu-ray on November 11, 2014, by Warner Home Video.

=== Box office ===
Jersey Boys grossed $47 million in North America and $20.6 million in other territories for a worldwide total of $67.6 million.

The film grossed $4.6 million on its opening day, almost $8 million less than fellow newcomer Think Like a Man Too. In its opening weekend, the film grossed $13.3 million, finishing in fourth place at the box office.
