= Beggin' =

1967 single by the Four Seasons

Single by the Four Seasons

from the album New Gold Hits
- B-side: "Dody"
- Released: February 1967
- Genre: Northern soul
- Length: 2:48
- Label: Philips
- Songwriters: Bob Gaudio; Peggy Farina
- Producer: Bob Crewe

The Four Seasons singles chronology
"Tell It to the Rain" (1966)	"Beggin'" (1967)	"C'mon Marianne" (1967)

Official audio
- "Beggin'" on YouTube

"Beggin'" is a song composed by Bob Gaudio and Peggy Farina and first released as a single by American band the Four Seasons in 1967. Initially charting at number 16 on the US Billboard chart, the song became popular in the Northern soul scene in the United Kingdom in the 1970s. It has been covered multiple times, with versions by Norwegian hip-hop duo Madcon and Italian rock band Måneskin topping music charts in Europe and beyond. The Four Seasons' version was remixed in 2007 by French DJ Pilooski and re-released as a single, reaching number 32 on the UK Singles Chart, commercially outperforming the band's original release in the UK.

== Original version ==
Keyboardist-songwriter Bob Gaudio had not written a Four Seasons single since 1965's "Girl Come Running", although he had written or co-written almost every hit for the band up to then.

"Beggin'", the second single from the Four Seasons' New Gold Hits album in 1967, marked Gaudio's "return" as the Seasons' songwriter, with a combination of Frankie Valli's impassioned soul singing and the band's more contemporary instrumentation. It was also the first Seasons single since "Dawn (Go Away)" on which Gaudio collaborated with a lyricist other than producer Bob Crewe, as lyrics were contributed by Peggy Farina (better known as Peggy Santiglia of the Angels, who sang lead on the 1963 hit "My Boyfriend's Back" and was frequently used as a background singer by Crewe).

The song, backed with "Dody" as a B-side, reached number 16 on the US Billboard Hot 100, continuing the group's string of Billboard top-20 hits. However, it was overshadowed by Valli's "solo" recording of "Can't Take My Eyes Off You", a Gaudio-Crewe composition, which rose to number two. It was the last Gaudio composition for the Four Seasons to chart in the top 20 until 1975's "Who Loves You".

The song is included in Act Two of the Broadway musical about the Four Seasons, Jersey Boys, in which the Seasons (here anachronistically including Nick Massi) beg mob boss Gyp DeCarlo to help them bail fellow band member Tommy DeVito out of his gambling debts. The Jersey Boys version featuring Frankie Valli and The Four Seasons, Ryan Molloy and John Lloyd Young was released on the Jersey Boys (soundtrack) in 2014. The song was used as the main theme of an ad campaign for Adidas, celebrating the company's 60th anniversary.

Retrospectively, the song has been highly regarded by music critics as a strong example of the Four Seasons' vocal and arrangement abilities. Donald A. Guarisco, writing for AllMusic, described the song as "one of their finest entries" in the genre of the soul ballad, and also commended the song's "funky groove" and "Phil Spector-styled production". Chris DeVille, writing for Stereogum, characterized the song as featuring a "contagiously upbeat drum part", and suggested that its sound was an early predecessor to hip-hop music.

=== Pilooski remix ===
In 2007, French disc jockey Pilooski re-edited and released his version of the Four Seasons song. This version reached number 32 in the UK and number one on the UK Dance Chart. It is the first single from the album Beggin': The Ultimate Collection. The Pilooski re-edit does not include any new instrumentation or vocals but is purely a manipulation and remix of the original Four Seasons recording, using echo and phase-polarisation.

=== Certifications ===
Certifications for "Beggin'"
Region	Certification	Certified units/sales
United Kingdom (BPI)	Silver	200,000^{‡}
^{‡} Sales+streaming figures based on certification alone.

== Madcon version ==
"Beggin'"
- Cover used on most European releases

Single by Madcon

from the album So Dark the Con of Man
- Released: October 25, 2007
- Length: 3:38
- Label: Bonnier Amigo
- Songwriters: Bob Gaudio; Peggy Farina
- Producers: Hitesh Ceon, Kim Ofstad, Jonny Sjo

Madcon singles chronology
"Infidelity" (2004)	"Beggin'" (2007)	"Back on the Road" (2008)

Alternative cover
- US cover

Music video
- "Beggin" on YouTube

In 2007, the same year as the Pilooski remix, Norwegian hip-hop duo Madcon released a new version of the song with tweaked lyrics and added rap verses. Madcon's version of the song is a total re-recording, with all instruments performed by production team 3Elementz (Hitesh Ceon, Kim Ofstad, Jonny Sjo) and all vocals by Madcon. This version reached number one on Norway's VG-lista chart for 12 nonconsecutive weeks and received the "Hit of the Year" Spellemannprisen award.

The single also became popular throughout Europe; in France, the Netherlands, Ukraine, and the Wallonia region of Belgium, it peaked at number one. It reached number five in the United Kingdom and number seven in Germany. Overall, "Beggin'" was Europe's 11th-most-successful single of 2008. The music video features Yosef Wolde-Mariam and Tshawe Baqwa in a mix of Blaxploitation scenes and dozing off while playing Halo 3 and was directed by Christian Holm-Glad.

Following the success of Måneskin's cover in 2021, Madcon's version saw a rise in popularity. As a result, the duo teamed up with Canadian DJ Frank Walker for a remix released on July 16, 2021.

=== Track listings ===
French CD single

1. "Beggin'" (original version) – 3:38
2. "Beggin'" (Uscar version) – 3:38

German maxi-CD single

1. "Beggin'" (original version) – 3:38
2. "Beggin'" (Phreak Inc. remix) – 4:11
3. "Beggin'" (Demolition Disco remix) – 5:41
4. "Beggin'" (DJ Size Rocfam remix) – 3:09
5. "Beggin'" (video) – 3:41

Digital download

1. "Beggin'" – 3:38

Digital download – Frank Walker remix

1. "Beggin'" (Frank Walker remix) – 3:14

=== Charts ===
==== Weekly charts ====
2007–2009 weekly chart performance for "Beggin'"
Chart (2007–2009)	Peak position
Austria (Ö3 Austria Top 40)	7
Belgium (Ultratop 50 Flanders)	20
Belgium (Ultratop 50 Wallonia)	1
Canada Hot 100 (Billboard)	9
CIS Airplay (TopHit)	8
Czech Republic Airplay (ČNS IFPI)	4
Europe (Eurochart Hot 100)	2
France (SNEP)	1
Germany (GfK)	7
Hungary (Rádiós Top 40)	2
Hungary (Dance Top 40)	17
Ireland (IRMA)	8
Italy (FIMI)	8
Netherlands (Dutch Top 40)	1
Netherlands (Single Top 100)	1
Norway (VG-lista)	1
Portugal Digital Songs (Billboard)	2
Russia Airplay (TopHit)	6
Scottish Singles Sales (Official Charts)	18
Slovakia Airplay (ČNS IFPI)	15
Spain (Promusicae)	4
Sweden (Sverigetopplistan)	11
Switzerland (Schweizer Hitparade)	5
Turkey (Turkiye Top 20)	2
Ukraine Airplay (TopHit)	1
UK Singles (Official Charts)	5
UK Hip Hop/R&B (Official Charts)	1
US Billboard Hot 100	79
US Dance Airplay (Billboard)	5
US Pop Airplay (Billboard)	32
US Rhythmic Airplay (Billboard)	23

2025 weekly chart performance for "Beggin'"
Chart (2025)	Peak position
Moldova Airplay (TopHit)	83

==== Year-end charts ====
2008 year-end chart performance for "Beggin'"
Chart (2008)	Position
Austria (Ö3 Austria Top 40)	25
Belgium (Ultratop 50 Flanders)	49
Belgium (Ultratop 50 Wallonia)	24
CIS Airplay (TopHit)	40
Europe (Eurochart Hot 100)	11
France (SNEP)	4
Germany (Media Control GfK)	31
Hungary (Dance Top 40)	98
Hungary (Rádiós Top 40)	16
Russia Airplay (TopHit)	35
Switzerland (Schweizer Hitparade)	25
Ukraine Airplay (TopHit)	116
UK Singles (OCC)	53

2009 year-end chart performance for "Beggin'"
Chart (2009)	Position
Belgium (Ultratop 50 Wallonia)	71
CIS Airplay (TopHit)	196
Europe (Eurochart Hot 100)	48
France (SNEP)	81
Hungary (Rádiós Top 40)	5
Netherlands (Dutch Top 40)	4
Netherlands (Single Top 100)	9
Spain (Promusicae)	30
Ukraine Airplay (TopHit)	21
UK Singles (OCC)	167

2022 year-end chart performance for "Beggin'"
Chart (2022)	Position
Hungary (Rádiós Top 40)	88

==== Decade-end charts ====
Decade-end chart performance for "Beggin'"
Chart (2000–2009)	Position
Russia Airplay (TopHit)	123

=== Certifications ===
Certifications and sales for "Beggin'"
Region	Certification	Certified units/sales
Belgium (BRMA)	Gold	
Denmark (IFPI Danmark)	Gold	45,000^{‡}
France (SNEP)	Gold	200,000^{*}
Germany (BVMI)	Gold	150,000^{^}
Italy (FIMI)	Gold	35,000^{‡}
New Zealand (RMNZ)	Platinum	30,000^{‡}
Spain (Promusicae)	Platinum	25,000^{^}
United Kingdom (BPI)	2× Platinum	1,200,000^{‡}
^{*} Sales figures based on certification alone.^{^} Shipments figures based on certification alone.^{‡} Sales+streaming figures based on certification alone.

=== Release history ===
Release dates and formats for "Beggin'"
Region	Date	Format	Label(s)	Ref.
United States	March 24, 2009	Mainstream airplay	Universal Republic	

== Måneskin cover ==
Italian rock band Måneskin performed a cover of the song during the eleventh season of X Factor Italia, where the group was coached by Manuel Agnelli. A studio version of the song later appeared on their debut extended play Chosen, released in 2017. Their cover largely follows the structure of the Madcon version, including the rap verse. Although it was not released as a single, it peaked at number 39 on the Italian Singles Chart and in 2018 received a gold certification by FIMI in their native country.

Following the band's Eurovision victory in late May 2021, the song alongside the band's other releases started appearing on music charts across Europe and beyond; viral success for the song on video sharing service TikTok soon followed. "Beggin'" reached number one on the weekly charts in Austria, the Czech Republic, Germany, Greece, Lithuania, Netherlands, Portugal, Slovakia and Switzerland, the top five in Australia, Finland, France, Hungary, Ireland, Malaysia, New Zealand, Norway and Sweden, and the top ten in Canada, Denmark, India, Philippines, Singapore and the United Kingdom.

== Other cover versions ==
- The Four Seasons' original version did not chart in the United Kingdom. Instead, psychedelic pop band Timebox had a minor hit with their Michael Aldred production of the song, peaking at number 38 in 1968.
- In 1967 Italian singer Riki Maiocchi performed his cover, "Prega".
- Also in 1967, a Spanish version was released under the title "Ruega" by the band "Duo Inter".
- French singer and composer Claude François sung the French version "Reste" (lit. meaning "Stay") in 1968.
- In 1974, Dutch band Shocking Blue included a cover version of the song on their album Good Times.
- In 2008, British-Irish girl band the Saturdays, inspired by both Pilooski and Madcon, recorded their own version as a B-side for their single "Issues", a single from their debut studio album Chasing Lights (2008), and performed a live acoustic version on BBC Radio 1's Live Lounge as well as on their The Work Tour in 2009.
- Turkish türkü singer Ferhat Güzel parodied the song, dubbed "Begüm (Suçu Kendine At)" - literally "Begüm (Blame Yourself)", for Okan Bayülgen's TV show Disko Kralı.
- It was sung by Michael Sarver, Megan Joy, Scott MacIntyre, Lil Rounds, Anoop Desai and Matt Giraud at the end of the first half of the American Idol Tour.
- Turkish band Dolapdere Big Gang covered the song on their 2010 album Art-ist. French singer-guitarist Aymeric Savignat (a.k.a. "Tidusko") covered the song on the compilation album La Musique de Paris Dernière Vol.7 (2009).
- In 2012, vocal harmony group District3 performed the song as part of a mash-up with Chris Brown's "Turn Up the Music" on The X Factor UK.
- Swedish singer Magnus Carlson, usually the front man of Weeping Willows, has covered the song twice, first in a version with lyrics translated into Swedish ("Jag Ber Dig") in 2003, and later a version with the original lyrics in 2018.
- Yuqi of South Korean girl group (G)I-DLE released a cover version of Beggin' on YouTube in September 2022.
- The Four Seasons re-recorded the record in 2024 as an instrumental as a bonus track on the re-release of their 2008 children's album Jersey Babys. The new record was supervised by Gaudio and arranged by modern-era Four Seasons bandleader Robby Robinson, without Valli's direct involvement.
- South Korean boy group VERIVERY released a variation of the song as "RED (Beggin')" in December 2025.

== Samples ==
- In 2011, the rapper Logic sampled the Madcon version on his song Beggin, which is in his debut mixtape Young Sinatra.
- Coincidentally, another artist named Logic sampled "Beggin'" in his 2007 song "Begging You".
- The Yeah Yeah Yeahs borrowed a piano riff and a piece of lyric from the song in their own composition "Burning".

== Uses in the media ==
- In 2009, many remixes similar to the Pilooski remix of the original "Beggin'" were used in adidas' "House Party" commercial featuring many celebrities past and present who were sponsored by the company, which was promoting 60 years of "outfitting the world in three stripes." Celebrities who make an appearance in the commercial include David Beckham, Missy Elliott, Katy Perry, The Ting Tings, Kevin Garnett, Young Jeezy, Russell Simmons, Estelle, Redman, Method Man and Ilie Năstase, among others. One of these remixes was made by aKido and can be found on his soundcloud page.
- The song was used as part of the BBC's coverage of the 2009/2010 Formula One Championship, primarily during course run-through.
- Also in 2009, the Madcon cover of "Beggin'" was used by HBO as a theme for its summer programming. "Beggin'" was on the NBA Live 2009 video game soundtrack.
- The song is also used: in a scene in the film Just Go With It; in part of the Bad Teacher trailer; as the song for the 24th Street part in the Tilt Mode Army skateboarding video; in the film Step Up 3D; and in the film Macaframa.
- The Madcon version of "Beggin'" was sung by the winning contestant from American Idol (season 11), Phillip Phillips in the final three performance night. Matthew Fisher has stated that he got the idea for the chord sequence for his composition "Repent Walpurgis" on Procol Harum's first album from the Four Seasons' "Beggin'".
- The song saw a resurgence in 2021 on TikTok thanks to Måneskin's cover, when it was first uploaded as a sound by user tvdposts. Its rise in popularity was particularly boosted through its usage by user Charli D'Amelio.
- The original version by the Four Seasons was used in the episode "Dangling Man" in the third season of the Netflix series The Crown when young Camilla Shand is on her way to visit the Prince of Wales in Buckingham Palace.
- The original version of the song was used in the 2023 film The Iron Claw.
- The original version of the song was used in the 2026 film Clayface.

== See also ==
- List of UK Dance Singles Chart number ones of 2007
- List of number-one hits in Norway
- List of number-one hits of 2008 (France)
- List of Ultratop 40 number-one singles of 2008
- List of Dutch Top 40 number-one singles of 2009
