= Philip Bulcock =

English actor (born 1970)

- Born: Philip Garry Pickup; 6 July 1970 (age 56); Jericho, Bury, Greater Manchester, England
- Occupation: Actor
- Years active: 1997–present
- Spouse: Annabel Wright (2011–present)
- Children: Jordan, Otis, Orson

Philip Bulcock a.k.a. Philip Lambert (born 6 July 1970) is an English actor who has appeared in numerous award-winning film and theatre productions. He played the part of The Four Seasons' bassist and vocal arranger, Nick Massi in the original cast of the Olivier Award-winning UK West End production of Jersey Boys and Murphy in The Dark Knight directed by Christopher Nolan.

== Early life ==
The son of a teacher and an electrical engineer, Bulcock was born Philip Garry Pickup in Jericho, Bury but was raised by his mother and step-father in the Rossendale Valley and Poole changing schools repeatedly due to frequent re-location. He was a student at both Bacup and Rawtenstall Grammar School and Poole Grammar School before moving to London to attend drama school.

== Training ==
As a teenager Bulcock gained a place at the National Youth Theatre where he performed the role of Second Tempter in their production of T. S. Eliot's play Murder in the Cathedral at the Edinburgh International Festival. He attended Mountview Academy of Theatre Arts to study acting and later The School of the Science of Acting (now known as The Kogan Academy of Dramatic Arts) where he trained in Acting and Directing for four years under the Russian theatre practitioner and founder of The Science of Acting technique, Sam Kogan.

== Career ==
Bulcock's career began with the Channel 4 TV movie The Fireboy, playing Billy Maslin alongside Anita Dobson and James Hazeldine. He then moved on to the stage and appeared in Musicals such as Elvis. The Musical, Grease with Shane Richie and Luke Goss and Return to the Forbidden Planet (Shakespeare & Rock n' Roll ) in Berlin, before taking time-out of his career to train as a director. Subsequently, he appeared in the films Brothers directed by Susanne Bier, 28 Weeks Later directed by Juan Carlos Fresnadillo, Red Tails directed by Anthony Hemingway and Tim Burton's Dark Shadows. He also provided the voice of David Sherlock for the independent feature-length animation, A Liar's Autobiography: The Untrue Story of Monty Python's Graham Chapman. On television Philip starred in the Channel 5 series Hanrahan Investigates and played a guest role in the BBC medical drama, Casualty. On stage he has appeared in Golden Boy directed by Isabel Lynch at the Lyric Theatre Belfast and the West Yorkshire Playhouse, Of Mice and Men directed by Jonathan Church at the Savoy Theatre, Romeo and Juliet directed by Bill Bryden, and Misery directed by Andrew Lynford and co-starring Rebecca Wheatley. He most recently appeared in The King and I directed by Bartlett Sher and Footloose directed by Racky Plews.

== Directing and producing ==
Bulcock has spent over a decade collaborating with director Nic Saunders on both the feature film Queen of the Redwood Mountains in which he also plays the role of the young John Anderson and a quaternary of short films based on works of the Beat Generation poets; Jack Kerouac, Allen Ginsberg, William Burroughs and Michael McClure. He is working with writer, producer and director Robert Valentine to adapt Valentine's film Liar's Dice into a stage play. Philip's own directorial debut is the short film Everybody Knows My Name based on the song of the same name written by Bob Gaudio and Bob Crewe. The film features the actors who played The Four Seasons in the original cast of the London production of Jersey Boys, Ryan Molloy, Stephen Ashfield, Glenn Carter and Bulcock himself.

== Personal life ==
Philip married the actress Annabel Wright in Los Angeles in October 2011. They met while filming 40 episodes of the Channel 5 'faction' series Hanrahan Investigates, co-starring the investigative journalist and TV producer, Will Hanrahan. Together they have two sons Otis and Orson. Philip also has a son, Jordan, from a previous relationship.

== Filmography ==
| Year | Title | Role | Notes |
|---|---|---|---|
| 1983 | A Brother's Tale | Schoolboy | TV movie |
| 1994 | The Fireboy | Billy Maslin | TV movie |
| 2004 | Brothers | U.S. Soldier | |
| 2007 | 28 Weeks Later | Senior Medical Officer | |
| 2007 | Ocean of Fear | Jim Newhall | TV movie |
| 2007 | Hanrahan Investigates | Detective Bulcock | 10 episodes |
| 2008 | The Dark Knight | Detective Murphy | |
| 2008 | House of Saddam | Soldier | TV Mini-Series |
| 2009 | Blood in the Water | George Burlew | TV movie |
| 2009 | What's Your News? | Dylan's Dad | 1 episode |
| 2009 | Curses and Sermons | The Cowboy | Short |
| 2011 | The Real American: Joe McCarthy | Alvin Spivak | Documentary |
| 2011 | Everybody Knows My Name | Himself | Short |
| 2011 | At Apollinaire's Grave | The Poet | Short |
| 2012 | Red Tails | Mission Captain | |
| 2012 | Dark Shadows | Hard Hat 2 | |
| 2012 | A Liar's Autobiography: The Untrue Story of Monty Python's Graham Chapman | David Sherlock | Voice |
| 2013 | Crossroad | Michael Childers | |
| 2013 | Casualty | Dan Adamson | 1 episode |
| 2013 | One Night at the Aristo | The Pianist | Short |
| 2015–2016 | Doctors | Henry Shire / Scott Summers | 2 episodes |
| 2015 | X Company | Sturmbannfuhrer Richter | 1 episode |
| 2015 | Ordinary Lies | DS Kaufmann | 1 episode |
| 2016 | Beyond Valkyrie: Dawn of the 4th Reich | Hauptsturmführer Herzog | |
| 2016 | Spectral | Sgt. Chris Davis | |
| 2017 | The Good Blonde | The Poet | Short |
| 2021 | Queen of the Redwood Mountains | John Anderson | |
| 2021 | Vengeance is Mine | Mark | |
| 2025 | FBI: International | Dietrich Stein | 1 episode |
| 2026 | Psychogenic | Billy Rampton | |
