= Jersey Boys =

Jukebox musical premiered in 2004

- Playbill cover on opening night of the original Broadway run (2005)
- Music: Bob Gaudio and Bob Crewe (Note: Though the musical features music by multiple composers and lyricists who contributed to The Four Seasons discography, only Gaudio and Crewe are credited in the musical.)
- Lyrics: Bob Gaudio and Bob Crewe
- Book: Marshall Brickman; Rick Elice
- Basis: Songs by The Four Seasons
- Productions: 2004 La Jolla Playhouse; 2005 Broadway; 2006 US tour 2008 West End; 2011 US tour 2014 UK tour 2017 UK tour 2021 West End revival 2025 São Paulo; 2026 UK tour
- Awards: Tony Award for Best Musical; Laurence Olivier Award for Best New Musical; Grammy Award for Best Musical Show Album

Jersey Boys is a jukebox musical with a book by Marshall Brickman and Rick Elice. It is presented in a documentary-style format that dramatizes the formation, success and breakup of the 1960s rock 'n' roll group the Four Seasons. The musical is structured as four "seasons", each narrated by a different member of the band who gives his own perspective on its history and music. Songs include "Big Girls Don't Cry", "Sherry", "December, 1963 (Oh, What a Night)", "My Eyes Adored You", "Stay", "Can't Take My Eyes Off You", "Walk Like A Man", "Who Loves You", "Working My Way Back to You" and "Rag Doll".

The musical premiered at the La Jolla Playhouse in 2004 and ran on Broadway from 2005 to 2017. Since its debut it has been on two North American national tours and two national tours of the UK and Ireland. The show has been produced in London's West End, Amstetten, Las Vegas, Chicago, Toronto, Melbourne and other Australian cities, Singapore, South Africa, the Netherlands, Japan, Dubai, and China. Jersey Boys won four 2006 Tony Awards, including Best Musical, and the 2009 Laurence Olivier Award for Best New Musical.

The musical spawned a film adaptation in 2014.

== Development ==
In the early 2000s, Bob Gaudio, an original Four Seasons member, sought to make a musical from the band's discography; he noted in a 2008 interview that he was inspired by the success of Smokey Joe's Cafe and Mamma Mia! into believing that a rock-and-roll musical with existing songs could work. Frankie Valli, in 2024, recalled that he and Gaudio had conceived the idea of a Four Seasons life story production as early as the mid-1990s but that the only offers they received were for television movies that they felt would not do the band justice. The Four Seasons' touring production, by then featuring Valli as the sole remaining original member, was in bad financial shape; Valli, already considering retirement, recognized that an adaptation of the band's story had the potential to introduce the Seasons to an audience that had no familiarity with them.

Gaudio hired book writers Rick Elice and Marshall Brickman, who had difficulty finding a willing director until Michael David of Dodger Theatricals recommended them to Des McAnuff. Brickman suggested creating a show about the band's history, instead of repurposing their songs for an independent story the way ABBA did with Mamma Mia!; Gaudio liked the idea, noting that although biopics were a common format in film, such a story format was still relatively rare on stage and that, to his knowledge, none had been tried at the time. Brickman was drawn to the project because "it's a classic American story. It's rags to riches, and back to rags." McAnuff was initially lukewarm to the project and did not like the idea of naming the project after a Four Seasons song, fearing it would look like a cash grab instead of a legitimate artistic work; Gaudio came up with the title on a plane ride, reasoning that the band members were all just a bunch of Jersey boys, and the name stuck.

Little was known to the public about the Four Seasons' history before the musical, because magazines of the era did not write much about them. In their research, Brickman and Elice were surprised to find that the members had prison records, which might have prevented their music from being played if it had been publicized when they were active. According to Gaudio, "Back then, things were a little clean-cut, don't forget, so the idea of our story getting out was horrifying to us." Other bands of the time projected street-tough images, but The Four Seasons cleaned themselves up to be palatable to mainstream listeners.

Brickman and Elice also used material from interviews with surviving Four Seasons members Gaudio, Valli and Tommy DeVito. Nick Massi was aware of Gaudio's plans to make a musical in the last months of his life and enthusiastically approved of the project, but died in December 2000 before he could contribute any interviews. While the Four Seasons as a group made headlines, as individuals they did not receive much press, as groups like the Beatles dominated the media. Brickman noted that each member had his own perspective on what happened during their tenure as a group. Of the three surviving members, they approached DeVito last, who told them: "Don't listen to those guys. I'll tell you what really happened." Elice said that getting DeVito's version was a "eureka moment" and the contradiction in their stories was incorporated in the musical for a Rashomon effect. Family members of the late mob boss Gyp DeCarlo also contacted the writers to ensure that he would be portrayed respectfully.

Gaudio was part of the initial development team, but was not involved in the creative process during tryouts, and met the cast only after the show had premiered. He, Valli, and DeVito decided to step back from the show's creative process because they lacked objectivity, leaving it to Brickman, Elice, and McAnuff to take the story to the stage. But Gaudio and Valli still had the right to end the show if they did not like it; they ultimately recommended some minor changes (mainly to respect the personality rights of still-living people who were portrayed).

== Productions ==
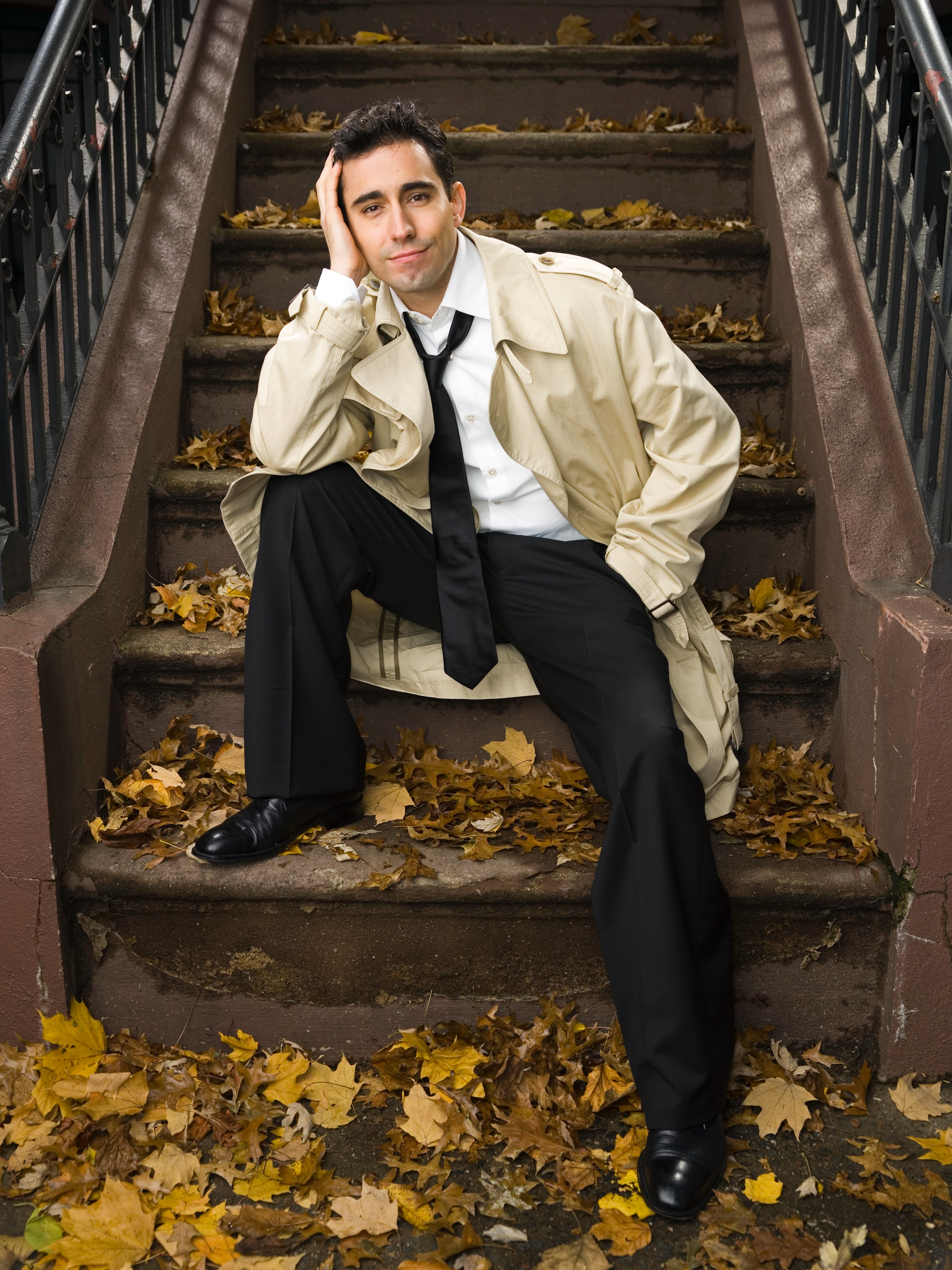
John Lloyd Young 2006

Jersey Boys premiered at the La Jolla Playhouse at University of California, San Diego, in an out-of-town tryout on October 5, 2004, and ran through January 16, 2005. Christian Hoff, David Norona, Daniel Reichard and J. Robert Spencer played The Four Seasons. At the end of the tryout, Norona, who originated the role of Frankie Valli, was replaced by John Lloyd Young, who originally had auditioned for the role of Tommy DeVito.

=== Broadway ===
The musical began previews on Broadway on October 4, 2005, and officially opened on November 6, 2005, at the August Wilson Theatre. The cast starred Young as Valli, Hoff as DeVito, Reichard as Gaudio, and Spencer as Massi. The musical was directed by Des McAnuff, at the time the artistic director at La Jolla Playhouse, with choreography by Sergio Trujillo. The Broadway production had 38 previews. It reached its 4093rd performance on September 22, 2015, making it the 12th-longest-running show on Broadway. Notable cast replacements include Andy Karl and Richard H. Blake as DeVito; Sebastian Arcelus and Drew Gehling as Gaudio; and Micheal Longoria, who originated the role of Joe Pesci, and Ryan Molloy, who originated the role in the West End production, both as Valli. The Broadway production closed on January 15, 2017, after 4,642 performances, with Mark Ballas as the final Valli.

=== Off-Broadway ===
Only months after closing on Broadway, it was announced that the musical would reopen off-Broadway, following the example of shows such as Avenue Q. It opened November 22, 2017, at New World Stages. The production featured the same script and score as the Broadway production, but four fewer cast members, a smaller theater, and lower ticket prices. Dodger Theatricals produced the off-Broadway Jersey Boys, and handled the show's Broadway and touring productions. Olivia Valli, Frankie's granddaughter, joined this production playing Mary Delgado. On March 12, 2020, production was suspended due to the COVID-19 pandemic; it remained suspended until November 2021. The musical reopened on November 15, 2021, and announced on April 22 that it would close on May 22, 2022.

=== U.S. tour ===
The musical's first U.S. tour began on December 10, 2006, at the Curran Theatre in San Francisco, and went to 38 cities. The cast starred Christopher Kale Jones as Valli, Deven May as DeVito, Erich Bergen as Gaudio, and Micheal Ingersoll as Massi. Jersey Boys played at the Forrest Theatre in Philadelphia, where it broke the box office record eight times before moving on to a return engagement in Boston.

In May 2007, while the first national tour continued (with Steve Gouveia from the original Broadway cast as Massi), a second company debuted at the Curran and ended as an open-ended run at Chicago's Bank of America Theatre, beginning on October 5, 2007. The Chicago cast appeared on stage in the 2007 Emmy Awards in a tribute to HBO's The Sopranos. A special holiday return engagement played at the Curran Theatre from November 20 to December 30, 2007, starring Rick Faugno as Valli, Andrew Rannells as Gaudio, Bryan McElroy as DeVito, and Jeff Leibow as Massi. Most of this cast became the original cast in the Las Vegas production, which debuted at The Palazzo Hotel on May 3, 2008, in the newly built Jersey Boys Theatre. The show temporarily closed on January 1, 2012, and reopened on March 6, 2012, at Paris Las Vegas. On June 7, 2016, it was announced that the Las Vegas production would end on September 18, 2016.

In late 2014, a touring production performed in several U.S. cities, including Denver in December.

Another production toured 19 U.S. cities from March 2016 to March 2017.

An off-strip Las Vegas revival opened in 2024 at The Orleans Hotel and Casino. The first preview performance was January 26, 2024 and the production opened on February 22, 2024. The cast featured Joey Barreiro and Jared Chinnock alternating the role of Frankie Valli, Kit Treece as Bob Gaudio, Tyler Matthew Burk as Tommy DeVito and Jonathan Cable as Nick Massi. The production played 24 previews and 116 performances and closed on July 7, 2024.

A "20th Anniversary" tour will kick off on September 8, 2026 at the Landmark Theatre in Syracuse, New York, before touring onto major cities across the U.S. and Canada, including Chicago, Denver, Los Angeles, San Francisco and more. The cast for the tour will star Coby Oram and Andrew Martin McGuire will alternate the role of Frankie Valli, Peyton Schoenhofer as Bob Gaudio, Harry Sperduto as Tommy DeVito and Owen McCredie as Nick Massi.

=== West End ===
The musical made its West End debut at London's Prince Edward Theatre in February 2008. The creative team were the same as for the Broadway production. Principal cast were Ryan Molloy as Frankie Valli, Stephen Ashfield as Bob Gaudio, Glenn Carter as Tommy DeVito, Philip Bulcock as Nick Massi, Stuart Milligan as DeCarlo and Tom Lorcan as Donnie/Knuckles. The production won the Laurence Olivier Award for Best New Musical. Molloy performed the lead role for six years, making him the "longest-running star in a West End musical" and "longest-serving Frankie Valli". The production moved to the Piccadilly Theatre on March 15, 2014, the same day that John Lloyd Young assumed the role of Frankie Valli. The production closed after nine years on March 26, 2017.

In October 2020, it was announced that Jersey Boys would return to the West End at the Trafalgar Theatre in April 2021. Due to the COVID-19 pandemic in the United Kingdom the production was postponed, with previews finally beginning 28 July and opening night set for 10 August 2021. A new cast was also announced with Luke Suri taking the role of Frankie Valli. The musical lasted until January 4, 2024.

=== UK tour ===
A national UK tour was launched in autumn 2014, opening at Palace Theatre, Manchester, where it ran from September 4 to October 4. This production has the same creative team as the Broadway and West End productions. The cast includes Tim Driesen reprising his role from the Dutch production as Frankie Valli, with Stephen Webb as Tommy DeVito, Sam Ferriday as Bob Gaudio and Lewis Griffiths as Nick Massi. A second national tour began in December 2017 at the New Alexandra Theatre Birmingham until May 2019. A third UK and Ireland tour will begin at the New Wimbledon Theatre from November 2021 with dates until November 2022.

A "20th anniversary" UK and Ireland tour, staged by the original Broadway creative team, opened at the New Wimbledon Theatre in London on June 17, 2026, and is booking into 2027. The full company was announced in August 2026, led by Luke Baker as Frankie Valli, Carlo Boumouglbay as Tommy DeVito, Lewis Kennedy as Nick Massi and Toby Miles as Bob Gaudio, with Ellis Kirk as alternate Frankie Valli. The company also includes Aiden Carson as Joey, Artemis Chrisoulakis as Francine, Sydnie Hocknell as Mary Delgado, Michael Levi as Bob Crewe, Olivia Mitchell as Lorraine, Jarryd Nurden as Hank Majewski, Oliver Tester as Norm Waxman, Damien Winchester as Barry Belson and Fed Zanni as Gyp DeCarlo. The tour is directed by Des McAnuff and choreographed by Sergio Trujillo, with musical supervision, vocal arrangements and incidental music by Ron Melrose, scenic design by Klara Zieglerova, costume design by Jess Goldstein, lighting design by Howell Binkley, sound design by Steve Canyon Kennedy, projection design by Michael Clark and orchestrations by Steve Orich.

=== Australia and New Zealand ===
The Australian production opened at the Princess Theatre in Melbourne on July 4, 2009. Principal cast members were Bobby Fox as Frankie Valli, Stephen Mahy as Bob Gaudio, Scott Johnson as Tommy DeVito and Glaston Toft as Nick Massi. The Melbourne production closed on July 25, 2010 and the Sydney production opened in September 2010. The Sydney production closed on December 18, 2011. Jersey Boys then opened in Auckland in April 2012 with the new touring cast. Jeff Madden from Canada starred as Frankie Valli, with Declan Egan as Bob, Ant Harkin as Tommy, and Glaston Toft continuing on as Nick. The Jersey girls were: Francine and others played by Kat Hoyos, Lorraine and others played by Michelle Smitheram and Mary Delgado and others played by Lisa Adam. running through June 17, 2012. Following from New Zealand, the same cast then returned to Australia starting a national tour - Brisbane, return season of Melbourne, Adelaide and Perth. The show ran until June 30, 2013.

An Australian tour played in Sydney, Melbourne and Brisbane between 2018 and 2019. The initial cast announcement had Bernard Angel as Frankie Valli, Cameron MacDonald as Tommy DeVito, Thomas McGuane as Bob Gaudio and Glaston Toft as Nick Massi. However, due to unforeseen personal circumstances, Angel pulled out of the show and was replaced with the Frankie alternate, Ryan Gonzalez, with Daniel Raso as the new Frankie alternate.

A "re-imagined, semi-staged concert production" of the show ran 8–11 February 2024 in Brisbane in the QPAC Concert Hall, again directed by Martin Croft, and with Glaston Toft again playing Nick (the only professional to have played the role in Australia, according to the program). In place of scenery, 10 large vertical LED screens behind the stage showed designs or impressionistic settings.

=== Canada ===
Due to the success of the national tour's long stop at Toronto Centre for the Arts in Toronto, Ontario, in autumn 2008, a Toronto production opened on December 12, 2008 with a new, mostly Canadian cast that included Jeremy Kushnier and Jenny Lee Stern from the first national tour. This production closed on August 22, 2010, on the show's second anniversary.

=== The Netherlands ===
A Dutch production, produced by Stage Entertainment, opened at the Beatrix Theatre in Utrecht on September 22, 2013. This production features the songs performed in English and the dialogue performed in Dutch, making it the first time the show has been performed in a language other than English. The cast includes Tim Driesen as Frankie Valli, René van Kooten as Tommy DeVito, Dieter Spileers as Bob Gaudio and Robbert van den Bergh as Nick Massi.

=== Japan ===
A Japanese production, directed by Shuntaro Fujita, with Ken Shima as music director, opened at the Theatre Crea in Tokyo on July 1, 2016. Akinori Nakagawa won awards for his role as Frankie Valli, and returned for the 2018, 2020, and 2022 runs. Nakagawa and other members of the 2022 cast formed a vocal unit called JBB, covering Four Seasons songs and more.

=== Brazil ===
A Brazilian production, directed by Fred Hanson, with Jorge de Godoy as music director, opened at The 033 Rooftop in São Paulo on August 2, 2025. Cast Includes Henrique Moretzsohn as Frankie Valli, Velson D’Souza as Tommy DeVito, Artur Volpi as Bob Gaudio and Bruno Narchi as Nick Massi.This production include tables instead of the traditional seats, so that the audience could have an immersive experience, the production kept all the songs intact.

=== International tours ===
An international tour with an all-South African cast ran in Singapore at the Marina Bay Sands resort from November 23, 2012, to January 27, 2013. The production then performed in Johannesburg, South Africa, at the Teatro at Montecasino on April 3, 2013, and at Artscape Cape Town on June 19, 2013. This company also performed at the Zorlu Center PSM, the Performing Arts Center in Istanbul, Turkey from November 13–24, 2013 and in South Korea from January 17 to March 23, 2014. The same production performed an edited family-friendly version without profanity at Istana Budaya, Malaysia from April 15 to 27, 2014. This cast includes Grant Almiral as Frankie Valli, Daniel Buys as Tommy DeVito, Kenneth Meyer as Bob Gaudio and Emmanuel Castis as Nick Massi.

An international tour of Jersey Boys opened at the Dubai Opera in October 2017. This production then embarked on a tour of China from November 2017 - January 2018. For both legs of this tour, The Four Seasons were played by Luke Street/Jonathan Vickers (alternating the role of Frankie Valli), Andrew Bryant (Tommy Devito), Matt Blaker (Bob Gaudio), and Nick Martland (Nick Massi).

Jersey Boys is currently playing on Norwegian Cruise Liner, Norwegian Bliss. The show premiered on the new ship in 2018.

== Synopsis ==
=== Act I ===
Spring

"Ces soirées-là" is performed. Tommy DeVito introduces himself and explains that the song, a number-one hit in France in 2000, is an adaptation of "December, 1963 (Oh, What a Night)", a song his group, The Four Seasons, originated. He begins to tell the band's story, explaining that each of the four members has his own version, but that they all begin on a streetcorner in Belleville, New Jersey, in the early 1950s ("Silhouettes").

Tommy is a member of the cover group "The Variety Trio" with his brother Nick DeVito and friend Nick Massi ("You're the Apple of My Eye"). They bring on Frankie Castelluccio ("I Can't Give You Anything but Love"), whom Tommy takes under his wing. The DeVito brothers are sent to Rahway Prison for a robbery ("Earth Angel"), leaving Frankie in the care of Massi, who works with him on vocal technique ("A Sunday Kind of Love") until Massi is himself taken to Rahway for a parole violation. Once Tommy is released, he rejoins Frankie, reluctantly setting Frankie up with Mary Delgado, who convinces Frankie to change his last name (which he had intended to change to "Valley") to the more Italian "Valli;" Mary and Frankie soon marry. A year later, Frankie falls prey to a fake murder scam, which Tommy defuses by calling his boss, mobster Gyp DeCarlo; Frankie is pressured into singing a song he had not done since age 15 ("My Mother's Eyes") and pleases DeCarlo, who offers a "claim check" for any future favor. Tommy constantly changes the group's name, lineup and style in an effort to keep up with fads, playing in small clubs to almost no success; one particular incident has the trio adding comedian Hank Majewski, whose monkey act ("I Go Ape") ends in disaster. One day, while running a pin-setting scam at a bowling alley, Tommy's co-conspirator Joe Pesci introduces the group to a singer-songwriter from Bergenfield who he thinks will be a great fit: Bob Gaudio.

Summer

Bob takes over the narration, telling the audience that he already had a hit single with "Short Shorts" and not to believe Tommy plucked him from obscurity. Bob goes with Joe to see the band perform, and is immediately impressed by Frankie's voice on "Moody's Mood for Love". In an on-the-spot audition, Bob plays his song "Cry for Me" with the band and agrees to join if he is granted equal partnership and gets to keep his songwriting rights, to which Tommy (at Frankie and Nick's prodding) grudgingly agrees. One weekend, Bob takes Frankie to the Brill Building and secures a session musician contract with Bob Crewe ("Backup Sessions"). Crewe insists that the band, upset at the poor pay and not being able to record their own material, has an "identity crisis" and needs to make a firm decision on a name, which they take from the same alley where Tommy was running his scam (leading the owner to chase them off when the band tries to audition): the Four Seasons.

Crewe schedules the group's first true recording session, and minutes before it begins, Bob writes their breakthrough hit: "Sherry", which explodes in popularity after a disc jockey named Barry Belson plays the song repeatedly. Bob's fears of again being relegated to one-hit wonder status are eased when "Big Girls Don't Cry" and "Walk Like a Man" follow "Sherry" to the top and establish their audience as the young American working class. With the band's newfound success, Bob cuts Frankie in on his songwriting royalties, while Nick takes Bob under his wing, helping him buy a new Cadillac and setting him up with a woman at a Christmas party, to whom Bob loses his virginity ("December, 1963 (Oh, What a Night)"). The band takes on a new opening act, the New Jersey girl group The Angels ("My Boyfriend's Back"), who become the band's paramours; meanwhile, Tommy has racked up a personal debt to the loan sharks in the tens of thousands of dollars. Frankie's constant touring and his wife Mary's alcoholism eventually lead them to divorce ("My Eyes Adored You"). The band survives the British Invasion ("Dawn (Go Away)"), and Bob begins looking toward the future when loan shark Norm Waxman confronts Tommy and the band after a concert to collect Tommy's unpaid debt of $150,000 ("Walk Like a Man (reprise)").

=== Act II ===
Fall

Nick, taking over as narrator, backtracks the story to cover some incidents Bob had overlooked, explaining that Bob never forgave Tommy after an unpaid hotel bill landed the quartet in jail after an Ohio concert appearance ("Big Man in Town") and Frankie lost respect for Tommy after Tommy attempted to make a pass at Frankie's new girlfriend, Lorraine; in revenge, Tommy escalated his gambling even further until Waxman calls in the debt. Frankie redeems his claim check with DeCarlo ("Beggin'") to resolve Tommy's debts. At a basement meeting with the Seasons, Waxman and DeCarlo, Nick, Frankie and Bob each call Tommy out on his faults, nearly leading to a fistfight. Bob suggests the remaining trio buy out Tommy's share to pay the debt (now at $662,000 after a vigorish and the band's taxes that Tommy also never paid are added), with Waxman insisting Tommy be placed in Las Vegas under the mob's watch as collateral; Frankie agrees to it and overrules Nick's opposition. Nick, who had earlier expressed private dismay when finding out about Frankie and Bob's side deal, makes his frustrations known to the remaining duo and abruptly quits ("Stay"), explaining that fame had taken a severe toll on his family life and that he needed to return home.

Winter

Frankie takes over narration ("Let's Hang On!"), admitting he had tolerated Tommy's embezzling out of loyalty, but that he was hurt and baffled by Nick's departure ("Opus 17 (Don't You Worry 'Bout Me)"). Frankie and Bob hire replacements to keep the band a quartet, fellow New Jersey natives Charlie Calello and Joe Long, but Frankie balks when Bob wants to hire a replacement for himself and a new drummer so he can move into a background role; they compromise, as Bob agrees to stay and Frankie takes on a solo side project to make more money. Back in New Jersey, Frankie's daughter Francine has run away to the city, prompting renewed fighting between Frankie, Mary and Francine; when Frankie asks Lorraine to take Francine in, she refuses and breaks up with him ("Bye, Bye, Baby (Baby, Goodbye)"). As the band embarks on a grueling tour to cover the debt, they strike their next hit "C'mon Marianne" but find resistance with Frankie's first solo record; Crewe teaches Bob some industry tricks to leverage "C'Mon Marianne" and make "Can't Take My Eyes Off You" a huge hit. Along with the success of "Working My Way Back to You", Frankie and Bob finally pay off Tommy's debts, and Frankie's life is peaceful for the next several years until Francine suddenly dies from a drug overdose ("Fallen Angel").

Finale

Crewe introduces a reunited Four Seasons at their Rock and Roll Hall of Fame induction in 1990 ("Rag Doll"); at the reunion, Tommy mentions his new life after settling in Las Vegas and invites Frankie, who looks forward to a second chance at fatherhood with three young sons, to a party in Nick's suite, which Frankie ultimately cannot bring himself to join. Each band member closes with a monologue explaining their lives at the time Jersey Boys was written: Tommy works for Joe Pesci and was welcomed back to Belleville as its Man of the Year for 2002; Bob has married and retired to Nashville, Tennessee while staying in touch with Frankie regarding the band's business affairs; Nick stayed in New Jersey with his children, occasionally sitting in with Frankie when the band played there, until he died on Christmas Eve in 2000; and Frankie continues to tour, reflecting that the band's streetcorner days were his favorite and that he continues "chasing the music, trying to get home" ("Who Loves You").

== Principal roles and casts ==
=== Original casts ===
Character	Description	Broadway	First U.S. National Tour	West End	International Tour	West End Revival	UK Tour	20th Anniversary U.S Tour
Character	Description	2005	2006	2008	2017	2021		2026
Frankie Valli	Lead vocalist of the Four Seasons, noted for his short stature and powerful upper range.	John Lloyd Young	Christopher Kale Jones	Ryan Molloy	Luke Street / Jonathan Vickers	Ben Joyce	Michael Pickering / Luke Suri	Coby Oram / Andrew Martin McGuire
Bob Gaudio	Songwriter and keyboardist of The Four Seasons. The youngest and last member to join the group, more intellectual and middle-class than the other three.	Daniel Reichard	Erich Bergen	Stephen Ashfield	Matt Blaker	Adam Bailey	Blair Gibson	Peyton Schoenhofer
Nick Massi	Bassist and arranger of The Four Seasons, recognized as a savant by the other members of the group.	J. Robert Spencer	Michael Ingersoll	Philip Bulcock	Nick Martland	Karl James Wilson	Lewis Griffiths	Owen McCredie
Tommy DeVito	Founder, guitarist and manager of the Four Seasons from its beginnings until being bought out to cover his gambling debts.	Christian Hoff	Deven May	Glenn Carter	Andrew Bryant	Benjamin Yates	Dalton Wood	Harry Sperduto
Joe Pesci (Note: Actors are also understudies for Frankie Valli.)	An excited teenager who works at the Four Seasons bowling alley and helps introduce Gaudio to the group. He later hires Tommy after Tommy is banished to Las Vegas.	Michael Longoria	Rick Faugno	Jye Frasca	Christian Tyler-Wood	Matteo Johnson	George Salmon	Grant Weathington
Bob Crewe	A Brill Building producer and composer who gives the quartet its break into the business and begins writing songs with Gaudio. Portrayed as openly gay and having a fondness for astrology.	Peter Gregus	John Altieri	Simon Adkins	Ryan Bennett	Ben Irish	Michael Levi	Andrew Sattler
Gyp DeCarlo	The head of New Jersey's organized crime syndicate and proprietor of the Sea Breeze Lounge, who employs Tommy in the band's early days and helps bail the group's members out of trouble.	Mark Lotito	Joseph Siravo	Stuart Milligan	Neil Stewart	Mark Isherwood	Jordan James	Jason Winfield
Norm Waxman	Tommy's loan shark.	Donnie Kehr	Miles Aubrey	Joseph Prouse	Joe Leather	Carl Douglas (Hank/Norm)	Norton James	Ryan Hurley
Mary Delgado	Frankie Valli's first wife, and mother to his daughters, of whom only one (Francine) is seen. A tempestuous, "type A" personality who divorces Frankie at the peak of the group's success.	Jennifer Naimo	Jackie Seiden	Suzy Bastone	Lisa Anne Lynch	Melanie Bright	Emma Crossley	Eliza Levy
Francine Valli	Frankie's daughter with Mary. Frankie is especially fond and protective of her, despite difficulties posed with his career as a touring singer, which Francine hopes to emulate.	Sara Schmidt	Melissa Strom	Michelle Francis	Chloe Carrington	Helen Ternent	Daisy Steere	Sarah Coleman
Lorraine	A reporter from Detroit who begins dating Frankie after he splits with Mary. Later splits when she refuses to take in Francine.	Erica Piccininni	Sandra DeNise	Amy Pemberton	Kate Leiper	Koko Basigara	Ellie Seaton	Alexis Aponte
Barry Belson	The radio disc jockey who breaks "Sherry" to fame with a day-long marathon. Belson is based on Joey Reynolds, who "bitterly resent(ed)" not being named.	Tituss Burgess	Brandon Mattheius	Tee Jaye	Unknown	Jacob McIntosh	Damien Winchester	Nicholas Dion Reese
Hank Majewski	A guitarist who is part of The Four Lovers alongside Tommy DeVito, Nick Massi, and Frankie Valli, before they evolve into The Four Seasons.	Steve Gouveia	Erik Bates	Griffin Stevens	Unknown	Carl Douglas (Hank/Norm)	Dougie Carter	Sam Joseph

The ensemble—portrayed by various actors from the supporting cast, depending on the production—includes group members Nick DeVito, "Handsome Hank" Majewski, Charles Calello and Joe Long; various police officers, an unnamed "French rap star," the three members of The Angels, the woman who helps Bob lose his virginity (based on Judy Parker but billed only as "Bob's Christmas Present"), one of Nick's girlfriends, a goon, a judge, priest, accountant, nurse, Albert Finney (a record label executive), a radio program director named Davis (based on CKLW's Paul Drew), and singers Hal Miller, Miss Frankie Nolan, and Billy Dixon, among various unnamed onlookers.

=== Notable replacements ===
==== Broadway (2005–2017) ====
- Frankie Valli: Mark Ballas, Ryan Molloy, Jarrod Spector
- Bob Gaudio: Sebastian Arcelus, Drew Gehling, Andrew Rannells, Drew Seeley, Colin Donnell (u/s)
- Nick Massi: Colin Donnell (u/s)
- Tommy DeVito: Richard H. Blake, Andy Karl, Jeremy Kushnier

== Music ==
=== Musical numbers ===
Act I

- "Ces soirées-là (Oh What a Night) - Paris, 2000" – French Rap Star Yannick and Backup Group
- "Silhouettes" – Tommy DeVito, Nick Massi, Nick DeVito and Frankie Valli ☆
- "You're the Apple of My Eye" – Tommy DeVito, Nick Massi and Nick DeVito ☆
- "I Can't Give You Anything But Love" – Frankie Valli ☆
- "Earth Angel" – Tommy DeVito and Full Company ☆
- "A Sunday Kind of Love" – Frankie Valli, Tommy DeVito, Nick Massi and Nick's Date ☆
- "My Mother's Eyes" – Frankie Valli ☆
- "I Go Ape" – The Four Lovers ★
- "(Who Wears) Short Shorts" – The Royal Teens ☆
- "I'm in the Mood for Love" / "Moody's Mood for Love" – Frankie Valli ☆
- "Cry for Me" – Bob Gaudio, Frankie Valli, Tommy DeVito and Nick Massi
- "An Angel Cried" – Hal Miller and The Rays □
- "I Still Care" – Miss Frankie Nolan and The Romans □
- "Trance" – Billy Dixon and The Topix □
- "Sherry" – The Four Seasons
- "Big Girls Don't Cry" – The Four Seasons
- "Walk Like a Man" – The Four Seasons
- "December, 1963 (Oh, What a Night)" – Bob Gaudio and Full Company
- "My Boyfriend's Back" – The Angels
- "My Eyes Adored You" – Frankie Valli, Mary Delgado and The Four Seasons
- "Dawn (Go Away)" – The Four Seasons
- "Walk Like a Man" (reprise) – Full Company ★

Act II

- "Big Man in Town" – The Four Seasons
- "Beggin'" – The Four Seasons
- "Stay" – Bob Gaudio, Frankie Valli and Nick Massi ■
- "Let's Hang On! (To What We've Got)" – Bob Gaudio and Frankie Valli ■
- "Opus 17 (Don't You Worry 'bout Me)" – Bob Gaudio, Frankie Valli and The New Seasons ■
- "Bye Bye Baby" – Frankie Valli and The Four Seasons ■
- "C'mon Marianne" – Frankie Valli and The Four Seasons
- "Can't Take My Eyes Off You" – Frankie Valli
- "Working My Way Back to You" – Frankie Valli and The Four Seasons
- "Fallen Angel" – Frankie Valli
- "Rag Doll" – The Four Seasons
- "Who Loves You" – The Four Seasons and Full Company
- "December, 1963 (Oh, What a Night) reprise" - The Four Seasons and Full Company ★

☆ On the cast album in "The Early Years: Scrapbook"

★ Not on the cast album

□ On the cast album in "Backup Sessions"

■ On the cast album in "Medley: Stay/Let's Hang On/Opus 17 (Don't You Worry 'Bout Me)/Bye, Bye, Baby"

=== Instrumentation ===
The score for Jersey Boys requires a small orchestra with ten musicians: three keyboards, two guitars, bass, drums, two woodwind players, and trumpet. The first woodwind player doubles on alto and tenor saxophone, clarinet, flute, and oboe. The second woodwind part doubles on tenor and baritone sax, clarinet, and bass clarinet. The trumpet also doubles on flugelhorn.

== Critical response ==
Ben Brantley of The New York Times wrote, "...the crowd goes wild. I'm talking about the real, mostly middle-aged crowd at the August Wilson Theater, who seem to have forgotten what year it is or how old they are or, most important, that John Lloyd Young is not Frankie Valli. And everything that has led up to that curtain call feels, for just a second, as real and vivid as the sting of your hands clapping together."

Charles Spencer from The Daily Telegraph wrote: "Overpaid, over-sexed and over here, it will, I suspect be some time before London says Bye Bye Baby (Baby Goodbye) to the PHENOMENAL Jersey Boys." Benedict Nightingale from The Times said, "Oh What a Night. There were times when I felt that the performers were making even the Beatles sound somewhat lacking in musical texture."

== Recording and adaptations ==
An original cast recording was made by Rhino Entertainment, Jersey Boys: Original Broadway Cast Recording (Rhino R2 73271), released in November 2005, which won the 2007 Grammy Award for Best Musical Show Album. In February 2008, the album was certified Gold, having shipped more than 500,000 copies in the US. In October 2009, the cast album was certified Platinum, selling over 1,000,000 copies in the United States.

A movie adaptation of the musical, with John Lloyd Young reprising his role as Frankie Valli, and directed by Clint Eastwood, was released in 2014. A live capture of the musical starring Nick Jonas as Frankie Valli, Andy Karl as Tommy DeVito, CJ Pawlikowski as Bob Gaudio, and Matt Bogart as Nick Massi was filmed in 2021. As of 2026, it still has yet to be released. In an interview with the I Wanna Be Like You podcast, Karl revealed that the producers are still interested in releasing it, but they haven't gotten the reception from distributors that they expected.

== Charity performances ==
The West End cast of Jersey Boys appeared as a guest act for the Royal Variety Performance 2008, which was staged at the London Palladium on December 11 in the presence of senior members of the Royal family. The Royal Variety Performance is a gala event held annually at a major British theatre, to raise money for the Entertainment Artistes' Benevolent Fund. In 2010, The West End cast of Jersey Boys performed a show, with the profits going to Children in Need. The show ended with Pudsey Bear joining in to sing a medley, and raised £60,150 for the charity. In 2009 the cast also appeared as a guest act for Children in Need.

Jersey Boys Chicago has been honored two years in a row at the Broadway Cares event for being the top fundraiser in the Tour category. In 2008, Jersey Boys Chicago raised $220,000 for BC/EFA.

For every ticket sold for every Broadway performance in the month of October 2010, $1 was donated to the VH1 Save the Music Foundation. Jersey Boys aimed to raise funds to restore one full music education program in a New York City school. The show eventually raised $43,521, enough to restore the instrumental music education program at PS 85 in the Bronx. Plans were made to donate additional funds raised to a second VH1 Save The Music Foundation grant recipient school.

== Alumni concerts ==
=== The Midtown Men ===
Four actors of the original Broadway production, Christian Hoff, Michael Longoria, Daniel Reichard and J. Robert Spencer, launched a tribute act called The Boys in Concert in 2010. Frankie Valli, Bob Gaudio, Marshall Brickman and Rick Elice sued the production, claiming that it "steals songs, stage elements and copyrighted logo" that imply that it is an authorized spin-off of Jersey Boys. The production was rebranded as The 4 Hitmen, and Hoff, Longoria, Reichard and Spencer counter-sued, claiming that the accusations were false, and alleging the use of "bully tactics" in an "effort to injure the livelihood and the reputations" of the actors. On September 23, 2010, Valli and company dropped the original suit, on the condition that the name of the performance is changed to distance itself from Jersey Boys. As of March 2024, this production is still active, and is named The Midtown Men.

=== Under the Streetlamp ===
Another touring act featuring former Jersey Boys performers, featuring members of the Chicago cast, tours under the name Under the Streetlamp. Under the Streetlamp has had its performances televised on PBS as pledge drive material. Michael Ingersoll, who played Nick Massi in the tour, originally served as lead vocalist for the group, with Christopher Kale Jones, Brandon Wardell and Shonn Wiley as the other members. Ingersoll and Jones departed in 2017, succeeded by David Larsen (the first non-Jersey Boys alum) and Eric Gutman.

== Awards and honors ==
=== Original Broadway production ===
Year	Award Ceremony	Category	Nominee	Result
2006	Tony Award	Best Musical		Won
2006	Tony Award	Best Book of a Musical	Rick Elice and Marshall Brickman	Nominated
2006	Tony Award	Best Actor in a Musical	John Lloyd Young	Won
2006	Tony Award	Best Featured Actor in a Musical	Christian Hoff	Won
2006	Tony Award	Best Direction of a Musical	Des McAnuff	Nominated
2006	Tony Award	Best Orchestrations	Steve Orich	Nominated
2006	Tony Award	Best Scenic Design of a Musical	Klara Zieglerova	Nominated
2006	Tony Award	Best Lighting Design of a Musical	Howell Binkley	Won
2006	Drama Desk Award	Outstanding Musical		Nominated
2006	Drama Desk Award	Outstanding Book of a Musical	Rick Elice and Marshall Brickman	Nominated
2006	Drama Desk Award	Outstanding Actor in a Musical	John Lloyd Young	Won
2006	Drama Desk Award	Outstanding Featured Actor in a Musical	Christian Hoff	Nominated
2006	Drama Desk Award	Outstanding Featured Actor in a Musical	Daniel Reichard	Nominated
2006	Drama Desk Award	Outstanding Choreography	Sergio Trujillo	Nominated
2006	Drama Desk Award	Outstanding Director of a Musical	Des McAnuff	Nominated
2006	Drama Desk Award	Outstanding Sound Design	Steve Canyon Kennedy	Won
2007	Grammy Award	Best Musical Show Album		Won

=== Original London production ===
Year	Award Ceremony	Category	Nominee	Result
2009	Laurence Olivier Award	Best New Musical		Won
2009	Laurence Olivier Award	Best Actor in a Musical	Ryan Molloy	Nominated
2009	Laurence Olivier Award	Best Theatre Choreographer	Sergio Trujillo	Nominated
2009	Laurence Olivier Award	Best Director	Des McAnuff	Nominated
2009	Laurence Olivier Award	Best Sound Design	Steve Canyon Kennedy	Nominated

== In popular culture ==
The HBO series The Sopranos made several nods to Jersey Boys. For example:

- Frankie Valli played Mob captain Rusty Millio, one of a group of just-released prison felons referred to by the show's fictional journalists as "the Class of 2004".
- In the Season 6 episode, "The Ride" (May 7, 2006), Marianucci Gaultieri accompanies several other Green Grove Retirement Home residents on a bus trip to see Jersey Boys.
- The Season 6 episode, "Walk Like a Man" (May 6, 2007), is titled after the Four Seasons' 1963 song.

In the 2010 comedy The Other Guys, NYPD detectives Hoitz and Gamble, played by Mark Wahlberg and Will Ferrell accept two Jersey Boys tickets as a bribe and attend the show.
