= Donny (album) =

Studio album by Donny Osmond
- Released: December 7, 1974
- Genre: Pop, R&B
- Label: MGM
- Producer: Mike Curb, Don Costa, Michael Lloyd, Alan Osmond

Donny Osmond chronology
A Time for Us (1973)	Donny (1974)	Disco Train (1976)

Donny is the seventh studio album by Donny Osmond, released in 1974. The album reached No. 57 on the Billboard Top LPs chart on March 1, 1975. Two singles, "Where Did All the Good Times Go" (No. 18 UK) and "I Have a Dream" (No. 50 US), were released from the album. The album was certified Silver in the U.K. on March 1, 1975.

== Track listing ==
No.	Title	Writer(s)	Length
1.	"I'm So Lonesome I Could Cry"	Hank Williams	2:56
2.	"What's He Doing in My World"	Carl Belew, Eddie Bush, Billy Joe Moore	2:32
3.	"If Someone Ever Breaks Your Heart"	Mike Curb, Mack David	3:00
4.	"Sixteen Candles"	Luther Dixon, Allyson R. Khent	2:37
5.	"Where Did All the Good Times Go"	Michael Lloyd	3:20
6.	"Mona Lisa"	Jay Livingston, Ray Evans	2:29
7.	"This Time"	Chips Moman	3:22
8.	"I'm Dyin'"	Donny Osmond, Alan Osmond	3:35
9.	"Ours"	M. Charles	2:42
10.	"I Have a Dream"	Solomon Burke, K.S.H.S. Burke	3:22

== Certifications and sales ==
Region	Certification	Certified units/sales
United Kingdom (BPI)	Silver	60,000^{^}
^{^} Shipments figures based on certification alone.
