= Brian Charles Rooney =

American actor and singer

Brian Charles Rooney is an American actor and singer. Technically a sopranist (sopranista or male soprano), he has also sung high tenor roles in theatrical productions in the United States, Canada, and Europe.

He made his Broadway debut in The Roundabout Theatre Company's 2006 revival of Kurt Weill and Bertolt Brecht's The Threepenny Opera in the role of Lucy Brown.

As a tenor, he played Tony on a European tour of the American musical West Side Story. He has been featured in musical and non-musical theatrical productions in such cities as San Francisco, Miami, San Diego, Los Angeles, and Dallas. He has been a featured soloist with the Seattle Symphony Orchestra and the Oregon Symphony Orchestra.

In 2013, as a pop-rock singer-songwriter, he began performing original material in concert venues in New York City. His collaborator is Paul Leschen, composer and arranger for the rock-band, The Scissor Sisters. Rooney's recent ventures in concert performance and production in New York City have been greeted positively.

Rooney starred as General George B. McClellan in the 2014 New York Musical Theatre Festival production of Bayonets of Angst, a bluegrass musical comedy about the Civil War. He was awarded a New York Musical Theatre Festival Award for Excellence for "Outstanding Individual Performance".

== Awards ==
In 2007, Rooney was awarded the Lys Symonette Award for Outstanding Dramatic Excellence by the Kurt Weill Foundation.
