= Lucky Boy (1929 film) =

1929 film by Norman Taurog

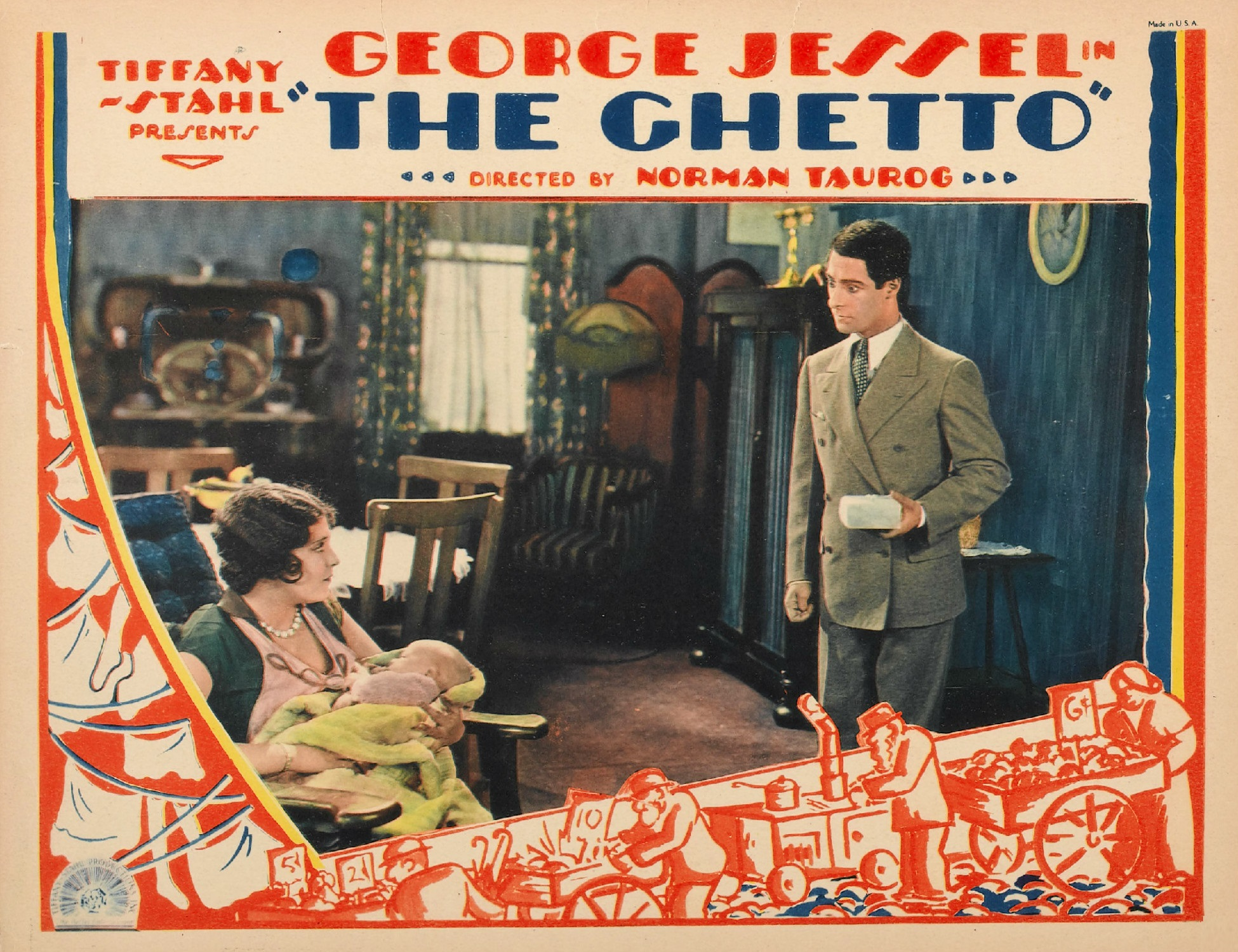
- Lobby card using the working title The Ghetto
- Directed by: Norman Taurog; Charles C. Wilson
- Screenplay by: Isadore Bernstein; George Jessel; Harry Braxton
- Based on: "The Schlemiel" by Viola Brothers Shore
- Produced by: John M. Stahl
- Starring: George Jessel
- Cinematography: Harry Jackson; Frank Zucker
- Edited by: Desmond O’Brien; Russell Shields
- Music by: Hugo Riesenfeld
- Production company: Tiffany Pictures
- Distributed by: Tiffany-Stahl Productions
- Release date: February 2, 1929
- Running time: 10 reels (8900 ft.)
- Country: United States
- Languages: Sound (Part-Talkie) (English Intertitles)
- Budget: $90,000
- Box office: ~$1,000,000

Lucky Boy is a 1929 American sound part-talkie musical comedy-drama film directed by Norman Taurog and Charles C. Wilson, most notable for starring George Jessel in his first known surviving feature picture. In addition to sequences with audible dialogue or talking sequences, the film features a synchronized musical score, singing and sound effects along with English intertitles. The sound was recorded using the Tiffany-Tone system using RCA Photophone equipment. The film's plot bore strong similarities to that of the hit 1927 film The Jazz Singer, which had originally been intended to star Jessel (the star of The Jazz Singer stage production) before Al Jolson took over the role.

Due to being a film published in 1929, it entered the public domain on January 1, 2025.

== Summary ==
Lucky Boy

A young Jewish man works in his father's jewelry business, but he does not like it at all—he wants to be an entertainer, something he knows that his father would never approve of. He comes up with a scheme to put on his own show in a theater and show his father that he can be a success, but things do not work out quite as well as he planned.

== Cast ==
- George Jessel as Georgie Jessel
- Gwen Lee as Mrs. Ellis
- Richard Tucker as Mr. Ellis
- Gayne Whitman as Mr. Trent
- Margaret Quimby as Eleanor
- Rosa Rosanova as Mamma Jessel
- William H. Strauss as Papa Jessel
- Mary Doran as Becky
- 'Patty and Fields' (amateur night act)
- Joe Sevely (amateur night act)
- Glenda Farrell as a secretary (uncredited)
- William Gargan in a bit part (uncredited)
- Sig Ruman in a bit part (uncredited)
- Charles C. Wilson as a stage emcee (uncredited)

== Production ==
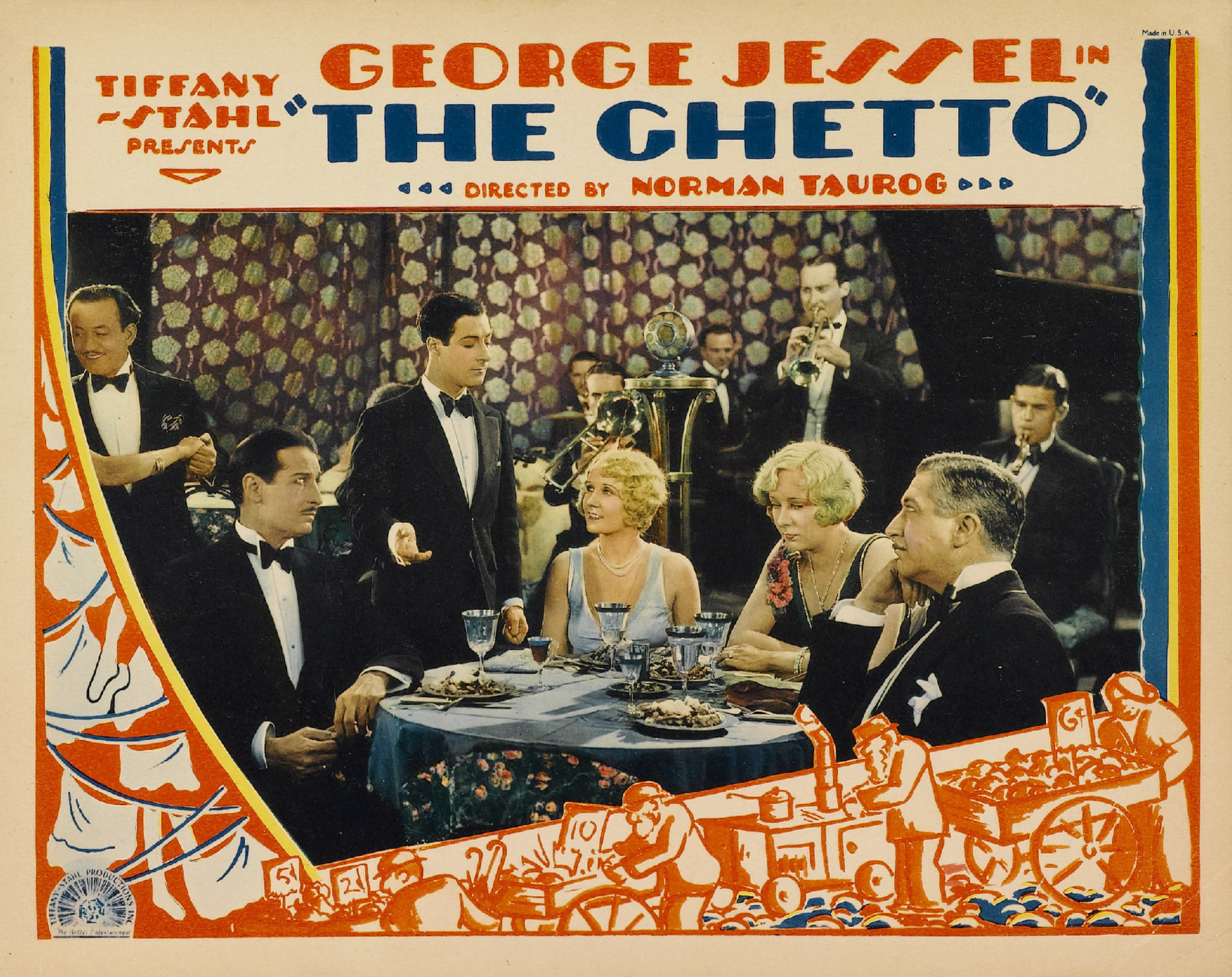
Lobby card

The film was originally developed with the title The Schlemiel based on a story by Viola Brothers Shore. It was initially filmed without sound by director Norman Taurog under the working title of The Ghetto in April 1928, reportedly in a "record time" of twelve days. Based on his role in the original stage production of The Jazz Singer, Jessel was billed as "The Original Jazz Singer" in advertisements. Jessel was credited with writing the spoken and intertitle dialogue.

== Music ==
The film's theme song (featured four times) was "My Mother's Eyes", which (along with the titular song "Lucky Boy") was composed by Abel Baer with lyrics by L. Wolfe Gilbert. The film also featured a score by Hugo Riesenfeld; "You're My Real Sweetheart" and "In My Bouquet of Memories" by Sam M. Lewis, Joe Young, and William Axt; "Keep Sweeping the Cobwebs Off the Moon" by Sam M. Lewis, Joe Young, and Oscar Levant; and "My Blackbirds are Bluebirds Now" by Irving Caesar and Cliff Friend.

Alongside Lucky Boy's theatrical release, "My Mother's Eyes" was released by RCA Victor as a single (Victor 21852), backed with "When the Curtain Comes Down" written by Carl Hoefle, Al Lewis & Al Sherman. As well as becoming Jessel's signature number, the song was re-recorded several times, including an instrumental version by Tab Smith (1952), Frankie Valli's debut 1953 single (which also featured in the 2005 jukebox musical Jersey Boys and its 2014 film adaptation), and the titular song from the Sonny Stitt album, My Mother's Eyes (1963).

== Preservation ==
Considered to be lost for many years, Lucky Boy is still in existence with a copy of the film held in the UCLA Film and Television Archive.

== See also ==
- List of early sound feature films (1926–1929)
