= Disco Train =

Studio album by Donny Osmond
- Released: August 21, 1976
- Genre: Disco, pop, R&B
- Label: Polydor
- Producer: Mike Curb

Donny Osmond chronology
Donny (1974)	Disco Train (1976)	Donald Clark Osmond (1977)

Singles from Disco Train
- 1. "C'mon Marianne" Released: June 5, 1976

Professional ratings
Review scores
Source	Rating
Allmusic	=

Disco Train is the eighth studio album by Donny Osmond. It was released in 1976 on Polydor Records. One single, C'mon Marianne, was released from the album. The title song and "I Follow the Music" were recorded before a live audience. C'mon Marianne reached No. 38 on the Billboard Hot 100 and No. 25 on the Easy Listening Chart. The album itself reached #145 on the Billboard 200 and #59 in the UK.

== Track listing ==
No.	Title	Writer(s)	Length
1.	"C'mon Marianne"	L. Russell Brown, Raymond Bloodworth	2:20
2.	"Old Man Auctioneer"	Alan Osmond, Merrill Osmond, Wayne Osmond	2:28
3.	"Swinging City Gal"	Alan Osmond, Merrill Osmond, Wayne Osmond	3:06
4.	"I Follow The Music (Disco Donny)"	Jerry Styner, Porter Jordan	3:21
5.	"Don't Need No Money"	Alan Osmond, Merrill Osmond, Wayne Osmond	2:56
6.	"I Can't Put My Finger On It"	Wally Holmes	3:20
7.	"Disco Train"	Lou Josie	3:34
8.	"Reachin' For The Feelin'"	Chris Christian	4:04
9.	"I Got Your Lovin'"	Alan Osmond, Merrill Osmond, Wayne Osmond	2:45
10.	"Disco Dancin'"	Bunny Hull	2:45
11.	"Never Gonna Let You Go"	Warren Schatz	3:50

== Reception ==
Dave Thompson of Allmusic described Disco Train as "a bottomless pit" of trend-chasing that contributed to Osmond's lackluster career in the 1980s.
