= Bayonets of Angst =

- Music: Rick Kunzi; Adam Barnosky
- Lyrics: Rick Kunzi
- Book: Rick Kunzi; Justin Zeppa
- Productions: 2014 New York Musical Theatre Festival

Bayonets of Angst is a musical comedy about the American Civil War written by Rick Kunzi and Adam Barnosky.

== Production history ==
In 2013, Bayonets of Angst was a finalist in the Ken Davenport Ten Minute Play Contest.

The premiere production of Bayonets of Angst was part of the 2014 New York Musical Theatre Festival and starred Tony Award nominee J. Robert Spencer, as Abraham Lincoln. The NYMF production also featured Paul Whitty ("Once"), Herndon Lackey ("LoveMusik"), Brian Charles Rooney ("The Threepenny Opera"), Michael Abbott Jr. (Shotgun Stories), Ian Lowe ("Murder for Two") and Ryan Andes ("Big Fish").

== Critical reception ==
David Clark of Broadway World called Bayonets of Angst "entirely fresh and novel ... featuring a waggishly witty book, hysterical lyrics and a brilliantly catchy bluegrass score," and "simultaneously everything and nothing you'd expect from a musicalizied account of the Civil War." Broadway Spotted reviewed that the show was "full of jokes, puns, play on words and everything in between," and "with non-stop laughter and beautiful music, it truly was an enjoyable time." Theater Mania called Bayonets of Angst "[an] irreverent and hyper theatrical production," with "a jaunty bluegrass score performed by the first-rate musicians."

CHARGED.fm listed Bayonets of Angst as a "Hot New Musical" and described it as an "exciting production that we think you should see."

== Awards ==
=== New York Musical Theatre Festival production ===
Year	Award Ceremony	Category	Nominee	Result
2014	NYMF Award for Excellence	Best Book	Rick Kunzi and Justin Zeppa	Won
2014	NYMF Award for Excellence	Best Ensemble	Michael Abbott Jr., Ryan Andes, Herndon Lackey, Ian Lowe, Brian Charles Rooney, J. Robert Spencer, Paul Whitty	Won
2014	NYMF Award for Excellence	Excellence in Overall Design	Seth Easter (Scenic Design); Candida K. Nichols (Costume Design); Zach Blane (Lighting Design); Harrison Adams (Sound Design)	Nominated
2014	NYMF Award for Excellence	Outstanding Individual Performance	J. Robert Spencer	Won
2014	NYMF Award for Excellence	Outstanding Individual Performance	Brian Charles Rooney	Won
