= Sam Kogan =

Ukrainian actor (1946–2004)

- Born: 22 October 1946; Chernivtsi, Ukraine, former USSR
- Died: 11 November 2004 (aged 58); London, England
- Education: Russian Academy of Theatre Arts (GITIS)
- Occupations: Theatre director; Actor; Theatre theorist
- Children: Helen
- Writing career
- Notable works: Founding principal of The School of the Science of Acting, previously known as The Kogan Academy of Dramatic Arts; Founder of The Science of Acting acting technique; Author of The Science of Acting

Sam Kogan (22 October 1946 – 11 November 2004) was a Ukrainian actor, director, and acting teacher. He is best known for developing and establishing an acting technique that he called "The Science of Acting." He founded The School of the Science of Acting (formerly 'The Kogan Academy of Dramatic Arts' and 'The Academy of the Science of Acting and Directing'), in London in 1991. He also wrote the book The Science of Acting, which was edited by his daughter, Helen Kogan.

== Early life ==
Kogan was born to a Jewish family in Sokyriany, a small city in Chernivtsi Oblast in the then USSR, but he grew up in Chernivtsi. In his youth he was an accomplished folk dancer and wrestler, competing in both at a national level. In 1966 he gained entrance to GITIS - the Russian Academy of Theatre Arts, where he studied for five years under the tutelage of Maria Knebel. Knebel was herself a former student of Konstantin Stanislavski, Michael Chekhov, Yevgeny Vakhtangov and Vsevolod Meyerhold as well as a colleague of both Stanislavski and Vladimir Nemirovich-Danchenko. Kogan graduated in 1971. He sought an environment conducive to his creative work, eventually arriving in London in 1974.

== Development of The Science of Acting ==
In London, Kogan began to develop his ideas about acting. Influenced in particular by Konstantin Stanislavski's acting system and sharing his purpose of "turning audiences into eavesdroppers, peering through an invisible wall on to the lives of real people.", over the next 30 years Kogan worked to develop an acting technique the implementation of which would enable actors to act as if unobserved. He believed:

We want to watch people who behave as though unobserved to find out how people live, so that we can better understand ourselves. Watching how people live ensures that self-understanding and growth can continue.

— Sam Kogan, The Science of Acting.

Accordingly, the technique evolved with the creation of realistic, audience-enlightening theatre as one of its guiding principles. For the rest of his life he worked to develop The Science of Acting into a stand-alone technique that would establish points of reference for good acting, opening his own school in 1991 where he served as both principal and head teacher. In the year before his death Kogan described The Science of Acting as a 'complete work...a totality, they now have everything they need.'

As an acting teacher and principal of The School of the Science of Acting, I have often been asked, 'Why is it important to understand the workings of the consciousness to become a good actor?' My answer, 'If you want to act well, consider this question - how will you be able to understand and portray the states of mind of different characters effectively if you do not understand the workings of you own mind?'

— Sam Kogan, The Science of Acting.

== The School of the Science of Acting ==
In 1991 Kogan set-up The School of the Science of Acting in Holloway, North London, offering a two-year diploma in acting and a three-year diploma in acting and directing. After his death in 2004 the school moved premises to Archway and became The Academy of the Science of Acting and Directing. As of 2014 it was known as The Kogan Academy of Dramatic Arts, offering full-time and part-time acting courses and a directing course as well as a three-year BA Honours degree in Acting in association with Kingston University. In 2019 the school reverted to the name The School of the Science of Acting.

During his tenure as principal of The School of the Science of Acting, Kogan engaged in frequent correspondence with The Stage newspaper, challenging the ethics and techniques of various drama training institutions and bodies. He also placed adverts for his school in The Stage that claimed "Nobody cares more, nobody teaches better".

== Significant students ==
- David Bark-Jones
- Richard Brake
- Philip Bulcock
- Eddie Marsan
- Pooky Quesnel

== Death ==
Sam Kogan died of a rare form of cancer on November the 11th 2004. A funeral service was held at The Russian Orthodox Church in South Kensington attended by family and friends as well as many of Sam's students.
