= Ryan Molloy =

British actor, singer and songwriter

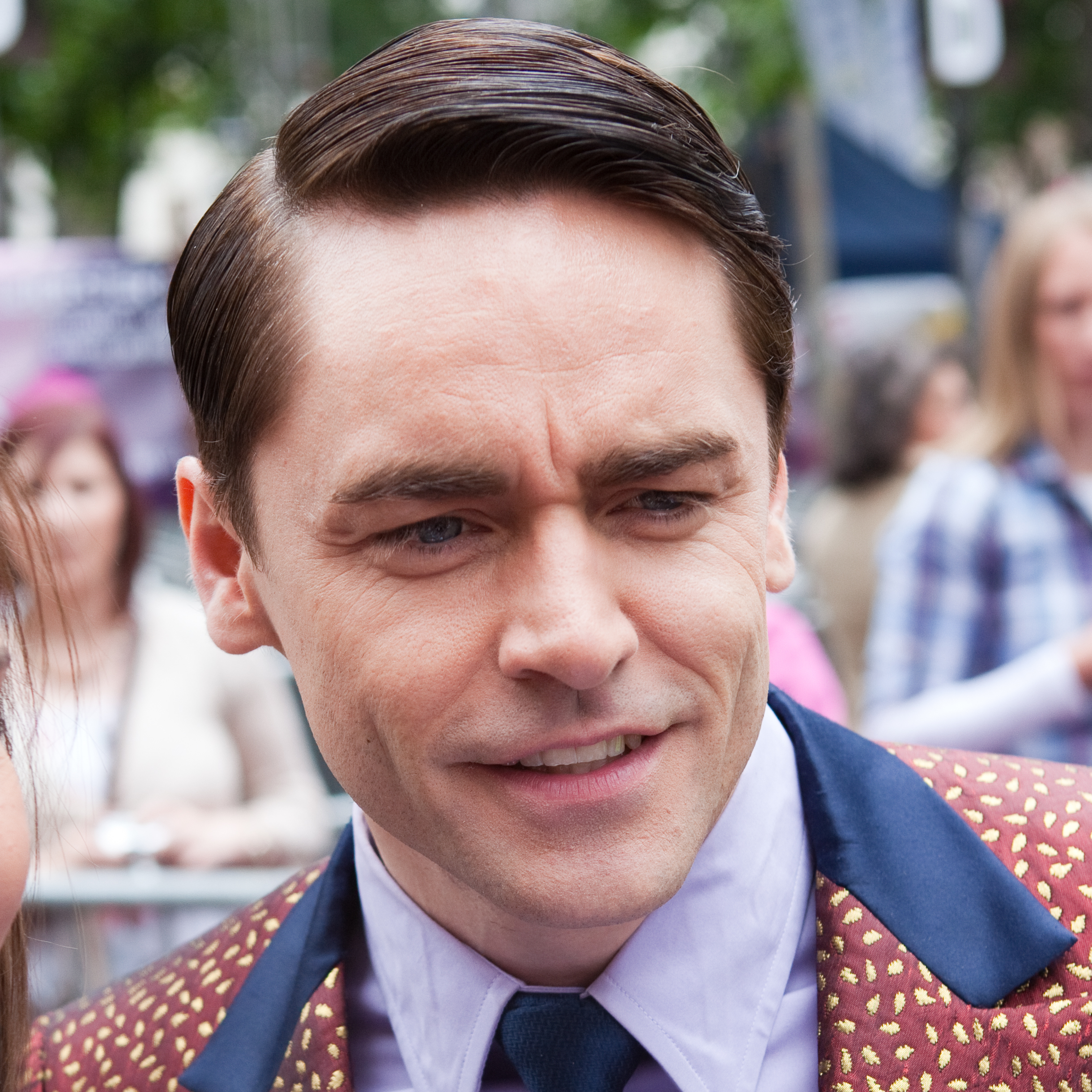
- Ryan Molloy, following his performance as Frankie Valli from the musical Jersey Boys, at West End Live 2010.

Background information
- Born: Ryan Molloy; 21 November 1972 (age 53); North Shields, England, United Kingdom
- Genres: Musical theatre; rock and roll
- Website: ryanmolloy.com

Ryan Molloy (born 21 November 1972) is a British actor, singer and songwriter. He has been successful in stage and musical theatre at West End and Broadway, appearing in a number of hit musicals, like Taboo, Jerry Springer: The Opera, Tonight's the Night, Godspell and six years in Jersey Boys playing as Frankie Valli made him the longest-running star in a West End musical. In 2004, he replaced Holly Johnson as the lead singer in Frankie Goes to Hollywood for a charity concert at Wembley Arena being a band member until 2007, and since 2012 is often active with the Trevor Horn Band with whom he recorded the album Made in Basing Street. He is known for his countertenor voice and falsetto.

== Early life and education ==
Molloy was born on 21 November 1972 in North Shields in Tyneside, to Bob and Winnie/Minnie Molloy. He recalls it was "tough living there". He attended Marden Bridge Middle School and Monkseaton High School. He left high school at the age of 16, but was enrolled in Delaval Studios part of Tyne Metropolitan College. Molloy then moved to London to train as an actor. He attended The Poor School, and later at the age of 19 also trained at the University of California, Los Angeles and New York City. He had hard time in the US, where also lived his sister Michelle, as was mostly making money by winning in karaoke competitions.

== Music career ==
After returning from the United States, in 1994, he was signed by RCA Records. In 1997, there was planned release of a five track self-titled debut album by RCA Records, but the release was cancelled. In 1998, Molloy sang the song "Black and White Army (Bringing The Pride Back Home)" written by Sting for the Newcastle's 1998 FA Cup final. However, after four years, his music career "just didn't work out".

On 31 October 2004, Molloy was chosen from 200 candidates as the new lead singer of Frankie Goes to Hollywood, appearing on 11 November in a special charity show for the Prince's Trust at Wembley Arena celebrating Trevor Horn's 25 years as a record producer, performing live "Welcome to the Pleasuredome", "Two Tribes", and "Relax". Horn considered he "was a hell of a good frontman". He performed with them also in subsequent 2005 tour, and wrote some new songs for the band, but they weren't released as they disbanded in 2007.

He spent some time in 2005 also working with Dave Stewart of Eurythmics on the spoof documentary Platinum Weird, which involved Christina Aguilera, Gwen Stefani and Carmen Electra. They would collaborate again in 2019, when Molloy performed live "Thorn in My Side" and "Love is a Stranger" at Eurythmics Songbook concert at Royal Festival Hall. He also appeared at Jools Hollands' Jam House Club for the Edinburgh Festival in August 2006, together with his band Suntan.

Molloy stayed in touch with Trevor Horn and on several occasions was part of his live The Trevor Horn Band and contributing lead vocals for "Freeway", "Man on the Moon", and "Stay Elaine" on studio album Made in Basing Street (2012), including lately in 2018 at Queen Elizabeth Hall, in 2019 at Cornbury Music Festival, 2021 at Rewind Festival, and 2022 at Cropredy Music Festival performing live FGTH's "Two Tribes", "Relax", "Power of Love" and Yes's "Owner of a Lonely Heart" among others.

On 1 and 3 June 2013, he performed "Make Our Garden Grow" with Barbra Streisand at two The O2 Arena concerts of her Barbra Live tour. The duet partners Il Volo cancelled on the day of the concert itself, and so Molloy was immediately called up with little time for rehearsal.

In 2009, Molloy released two albums, Sing's Frankie and Human, and on 23 September 2013 single "Turn on the Night", and in 2016, the pop rock album Turn on the Night "mainly made up of old songs I wrote". In January 2017, he held a concert at The Stage Door in Southampton. In April 2017, Molloy held a concert "Big in Japan" (pun on his size) in Tokyo, collaborating with producer Andy Wright and guitarist Kenji Suzuki from Simply Red. Molloy held solo concerts at Hippodrome, London in 2014, 2016, 2020, and 2021.

== Acting career ==
Molloy began his acting career in theatre appearing in a number of dramatic roles, including Los Angeles production of The Picked Cerebrum, and London productions of Betrayal and Shakespeare's The Merchant of Venice and Macbeth. In 2003 starred in the West End hit Taboo, playing Steve Strange alongside Boy George and Lyn Paul. In 2004, he gained a chorus role in the controversial production of Jerry Springer – The Opera, where Molloy was a member of the original cast at the National Theatre, and went on to play the parts of the transvestite Tremont and the Angel Gabriel.

In early 2006, he underwent an appendix operation, but managed get the role of Stuart in the touring production of Ben Elton's Rod Stewart musical, Tonight's The Night. In April–May 2007 played as Ozzie in the On the Town at the London Coliseum. In June he played Joilet Jake Blues in The Blues Brothers tribute musical Blues Brothers Unlimited at Centrepoint Theatre, Dubai. In August, Molloy played in Eurobeat at Edinburgh Festival Fringe. In September–October, he played as John the Baptist and Judas in Godspell, with theatre critics Mark Shenton and Sam Marlower praising his projection of charisma, being one of "few bright spots".

"The important thing is to keep developing the character, to keep it fresh, and, my goodness, a long run takes a lot of self-discipline."

—Molloy on his long lasting acting as Frankie Valli in Jersey Boys, West End, London.

In October 2007, Molloy was cast as Frankie Valli in the West End premiere of Jersey Boys at the Prince Edward Theatre, and played his first preview performance on 28 February 2008, and official opening on 18 March 2008. His performance was received with critical acclaim, with Lyn Gardner writing in her critical review that "if it works at all, it is because Ryan Molloy carries all before him as the pint-sized Italian-American with the extraordinary falsetto", while Shenton praised it and that "the energetic evening's anchor, Ryan Molloy displays amazing emotional and vocal range". For his performance he received an Olivier Award nomination at 2009 Laurence Olivier Awards, and was voted by the public as the Best Actor in a Musical at the 2009 WhatsOnStage Awards. He remained with Jersey Boys for six years, with 2,500 shows as the lead by February 2014, leaving with the last show on 9 March 2014, making him the "longest-running star in a West End musical" and "longest-serving Frankie Valli". Molloy also provided vocals in the 2014 soundtrack (particularly "Beggin'") of the film version of the musical directed by Clint Eastwood, for which also auditioned but was chosen John Lloyd Young instead. He reprised the role in the Broadway production for a limited engagement lasting from July to October 2014 at the August Wilson Theatre, New York City. In March 2017 were held two sold-out shows Frankie's Farewell Weekend of Jersey Boys London at Hippodrome, London.

In 2014, he played in musical Fings Ain't Wot They Used T'Be at Theatre Royal Stratford East. In the first part of 2016 toured Ireland with a musical Che Guevara's Night Off he wrote and starred in. In September–October 2016 at Cockpit Theatre, Marylebone, played Hades/Devil in a rock musical 27 choreographed and co-directed by Arlene Phillips, partly based on Greek mythology, telling "the story of a musician following a path of self-destruction at the age of 27". Molloy finds inspiring helping new small-scale projects using his profile, working with young people on new ideas and writing. Shenton said that Molloy "set free at last from his Jersey Boys high notes – has matured nicely into the role of the Mephistopheles-like Hades", while Sam Marlowe that "Ryan Molloy is charismatic as Hades, a sinister music exec like a diabolical cross between Iggy Pop and Simon Cowell".

In the last several years, Molloy founded Frankie and the Dreamers, a Frankie Valli-The Four Seasons tribute band, being a headliner for Royal Caribbean International and elsewhere. Molloy continued small-scale theatre performances acting in dramas The Tempest (2018), I Love My Wife (2018), Time Biter (2021–2023), and Julius Caesar (2023).

== Personal life ==
Molloy identifies as Irish. He lives in east London. His sister Michelle Molloy is a photo editor at Time magazine in New York.

He "was obsessed with John Hughes movies as a kid", Barbra Streisand's Hello Dolly soundtrack was his childhood introduction to performance, while Donny Hathaway's Collection inspired his voice and style.

Molloy supports Children in Need, Graham Wylie Foundation, Donkey Sanctuary and Cedarwood Trust charities. In September 2017, Molloy took part in the Great North Run.
