= Angelo DeCarlo =

American mobster

- Born: September 2, 1902; Hoboken, New Jersey, U.S.
- Died: October 20, 1973 (aged 71); Mountainside, New Jersey, U.S.
- Resting place: Gate of Heaven Cemetery
- Other name: Gyp DeCarlo
- Occupation: Mobster
- Known for: Loansharking for the Genovese crime family

Angelo "Gyp" DeCarlo (September 2, 1902 – October 20, 1973) was a member of the New York City Genovese crime family who dominated loansharking operations in New Jersey during the 1960s.

The subject of a two-year federal undercover operation, DeCarlo's conviction revealed widespread corruption of New Jersey public officials and tied singer Frank Sinatra to organized crime.

== Early years ==
DeCarlo was born in Hoboken, New Jersey on September 2, 1902 to Giuseppe DeCarlo and Annatonia Pantoliano, both immigrants from Monte San Giacomo, Salerno, Campania. He represented Genovese family business interests in the New Jersey underworld; he was an associate of Abner "Longey" Zwillman and Gerardo Catena. DeCarlo was an excellent cook; his specialty was fried pasta with anchovies. His wife died mysteriously after giving birth. He reportedly later married a woman named Frances Ryan and had two children. His arrest record included income tax evasion, breaking and entering, counterfeiting, robbery, and liquor law violations. DeCarlo owned the La Martinique Tavern in Mountainside, New Jersey

Based in New Jersey, DeCarlo rose to the position of caporegime, or captain, of a crew. He achieved this promotion by gaining control over the loansharking, or "juice" racket, illegal gambling, and murder for hire. DeCarlo also systematically eliminated his rival mobsters during the late 1950s.

== Mob career ==
=== Wiretapping ===
Between 1961 and 1963, federal agents began wire tapping conversations between DeCarlo and his mob associates. These wire taps revealed corruption among law enforcement, prominent businessmen and state officials including Newark Mayor Hugh Addonizio and influential Hudson County politician John J. Kenny. Both Addonizio's and Kenny's political careers ended after the wire transcripts were published. The transcripts also mentioned Sinatra. On one tape, DeCarlo discussed methods for committing murder; he described a so-called "humane" hit in which he shot a victim through the heart. According to DeCarlo, it was a painless way to die.

=== Saperstein death ===
In September 1968, DeCarlo and his men brutalized Louis Saperstein, who owed DeCarlo $400,000. Government witness and former mob associate Gerald Zelmanowitz described an intense beating of Saperstein in DeCarlo's office due to a $5,000 monthly interest payment. Zelmanowitz said Saperstein was lying on the floor, looking purple, his tongue hanging out, and he was covered in blood and spit. On November 26, 1968, Saperstein died of arsenic poisoning. That same day, the FBI received a letter from Saperstein that detailed his problems with DeCarlo. In March 1970, DeCarlo was convicted of conspiracy to commit murder and was sentenced to 12 years imprisonment.

=== Presidential pardon ===
After DeCarlo served 18 months in prison, President Richard Nixon commuted his sentence to time served (two years of a 12-year sentence), ostensibly due to his poor health. DeCarlo himself claimed to be dying of cancer (which turned out 10 months later to be true). Disregarding the usual protocol, U.S. Attorney General Richard Kleindienst approved the pardon request and sent it to White House Counsel John Dean. Dean then delivered the request directly to Nixon. It was rumored that Vice President Spiro Agnew, a personal friend of Frank Sinatra, persuaded Nixon to approve the request.

In December 1972, DeCarlo was released from prison. He died, from cancer, in Mountainside, New Jersey, on October 20, 1973. This was five days before a deadline to pay a $20,000 fine from his 1970 conviction. He was buried in Gate of Heaven Cemetery in Hawthorne, New York. The funeral was scheduled for the afternoon but was held in the morning because "the family just didn't want any more publicity."

== In popular culture ==
DeCarlo is portrayed by actor Christopher Walken in the 2014 film Jersey Boys about Frankie Valli and the Four Seasons. The writers of Jersey Boys, Marshall Brickman and Rick Elice, claimed to have been called by relatives of DeCarlo insisting he be "shown in a favorable, respectful way."

== See also ==
- List of people pardoned or granted clemency by the president of the United States
