= J. Robert Spencer =

American actor (born 1969)

- Born: Robert John Spencer; February 12, 1969 (age 57)
- Occupation: Actor
- Spouse: Jenny-Lynn Suckling
- Children: 2

Robert John Spencer (born February 12, 1969), known as J. Robert Spencer, is an American musical theatre and television actor, who was nominated for a Tony Award for his work in the Broadway musical Next to Normal.

== Education ==
He graduated cum laude in 1991 from the Shenandoah University musical theatre program, and received an Honorary Doctorate Degree of Fine Arts in 2009.

== Acting career ==
His Broadway debut was as a "swing" in the musical Side Show in 1997. He appeared in the musical Weird Romance in April 2004 at the York Theatre, New York, and the musical God Bless You, Mr. Rosewater in April 2005 at the York Theatre. He went on to star as "Nick Massi" in the original Broadway cast of the musical Jersey Boys (2005).

He starred in the Broadway musical Next to Normal, for which he received a Tony Award nomination as Best Actor in a Musical. He was also in the Arena Stage production (2008) and received a Helen Hayes Award nomination for Outstanding Lead Actor in a Non-Resident Production. He departed from the production on May 16, 2010, and was succeeded by original Off-Broadway cast member Brian d'Arcy James.

Spencer starred as Abraham Lincoln in the 2014 New York Musical Theatre Festival production of Bayonets of Angst, a bluegrass musical comedy about the Civil War. Spencer was awarded a New York Musical Theatre Festival Award for Excellence for "Outstanding Individual Performance."

He also has formed his own company, "7 Spencer Productions", for which he produces, writes, directs and acts in his own low-budget movies.

As a voice actor, Spencer was the voice of Seita in the anime movie, Grave of the Fireflies.

For television he has appeared on Law & Order, All My Children, and Girls Behaving Badly.

== Personal life ==
Spencer is married to actress Jenny-Lynn Suckling, and they have two children.

== Filmography ==
=== TV Series ===
- Law & Order – Lt. Mason
- Law & Order: Special Victims Unit – Joseph Soltice

=== Short ===
- High Expectations – Worthington
- The Quest – Narrator

=== Movies ===
- Amon Saga – Mabo, Messenger (voices)
- Farm Girl in New York – Alan
- Grave of the Fireflies – Seita (Central Park Media Dub) (voice)
- Heterosexuals – Larry
- Lost on Purpose – Loan Officer Don
- Night of the Dog – Bob
- The Ascension – Hitchhiker Bob
- The Vanilla Series – Masao Sera (voice)

== Broadway Credits ==
Preceded by --	Swing, Side Show; Oct 16, 1997 – Jan 4, 1998	Succeeded by --
Preceded by originated role	Nick Massi, Jersey Boys; Oct 14, 2005 – September 14, 2008	Succeeded by Matt Bogart
Preceded by Brian d'Arcy James but Spencer originated role for Broadway	Dan Goodman, Next to Normal; Mar 27, 2009 – May 16, 2010	Succeeded by Brian d'Arcy James
