= Rick Elice =

American dramatist

- Born: Eric S. Elice; November 17, 1956 (age 69); New York City, U.S.
- Education: Cornell University (BA); Yale University (MFA)
- Occupation: Writer
- Spouse: Roger Rees (m. 2011; died 2015)

Rick Elice (born Eric S. Elice; November 17, 1956) is a writer and former stage actor.

== Life ==
Elice was born in New York City, where he attended public elementary, junior high, and high schools. He was the salutatorian graduate of Francis Lewis High School in Queens, New York (class of 1973). He earned a BA from Cornell University, an MFA from the Yale Drama School, and in 1980-81 was a Teaching Fellow at Harvard. He is a charter member of the American Repertory Theater. From 1982 to 1999, Elice was copywriter, producer, creative director and eventually executive vice president of Serino Coyne, Inc., an entertainment advertising agency in New York. From 1999 to 2009, he served as creative consultant to Walt Disney Studios. He was in a relationship with British actor Roger Rees for 33 years, during which Rees converted to Elice's Jewish faith. A couple beginning in 1982, they married in 2011 when it became legal to do so, and remained together until Rees' death from brain cancer on July 10, 2015. Elice's memoir of Rees' life and their much-admired partnership of more than thirty years, called Finding Roger: An Improbably Theatrical Love Story, is published by Kingswell.

== Work for the stage ==
Elice with Marshall Brickman wrote the book for the Broadway musical Jersey Boys, which received a Tony Award nomination and a Drama Desk nomination for best book for a musical in 2006. With Roger Rees, he wrote the popular thriller Double Double, which has been translated into 16 languages.

He wrote Leonardo's Ring (London Fringe, 2003) and Dog and Pony (New York Stage and Film, 2003). Elice was creative director at Serino Coyne, Inc. (1982–2000), where he produced advertising campaigns for more than 300 Broadway shows including A Chorus Line and The Lion King. He was a creative consultant for Walt Disney Studios from 1999 to 2009.

In 2008, he co-wrote Turn of the Century with Marshall Brickman. The show was directed by Tommy Tune and premiered at The Goodman Theatre in Chicago in September 2008.

Elice collaborated with Brickman once again, this time writing the book for the musical The Addams Family. After a successful run at the Ford Center for the Performing Arts Oriental Theatre in Chicago, The Addams Family opened on Broadway on April 8, 2010, at the Lunt-Fontanne Theatre, starring Nathan Lane and Bebe Neuwirth as Gomez and Morticia Addams.

He wrote Peter and the Starcatcher, based on the 2006 novel of the same name by Dave Barry and Ridley Pearson, which opened in California in 2009 and played off-Broadway in 2011. The play moved to Broadway, opening at the Brooks Atkinson Theatre on April 15, 2012. Peter and the Starcatcher received nine Tony Award nominations, more than any new American play in the history of the Tony Awards. On June 11, 2012, the play won five Tony Awards. The play enjoyed a successful tour throughout North America in 2013–14.

His most recent collaboration with Brickman was for the film of Jersey Boys, directed by Clint Eastwood and released by Warner Brothers in June 2014. Brickman and Elice wrote the screenplay, adapted from their book for the stage musical.

A new musical, Dog and Pony, with book by Elice and music and lyrics by Michael Patrick Walker, had its world premiere at The Old Globe in San Diego in June 2014, starring Nicole Parker, Jon Patrick Walker, Heidi Blickenstaff, Beth Leavel and Eric William Morris, directed by Rees.

Elice wrote the book for a new musical based on the early life and career of Cher, titled The Cher Show, which opened at the Neil Simon Theatre on Broadway in December 2018, starring Stephanie J. Block, Teal Wicks, Micaela Diamond and Jarrod Spector, directed by Jason Moore. The show received two 2019 Tony Awards, for Best Costume Design (Bob Mackie), and Best Actress in a Musical (Stephanie J. Block).

Jerry Mitchell directed and choreographed Elice's next musical, My Very Own British Invasion, based on the teenage years of Peter Noone of Herman's Hermits fame. The show premiered on February 10, 2019 at Paper Mill Playhouse in Millburn, NJ.

In 2019, Disney Theatrical Productions announced that Elice and Tony winner Bob Martin would write the book, and Tony winner David Yazbek would write the score, for a musical adaptation of William Goldman's revered novel and cult film, The Princess Bride, for Broadway.

== Stage credits ==
Year	Title	Role	Venue	Ref.
2005	Jersey Boys	Bookwriter	Broadway, August Wilson Theatre	
2010	The Addams Family	Bookwriter	Broadway, Lunt-Fontanne Theatre	
2012	Peter and the Starcatcher	Playwright	Broadway, Brooks Atkinson Theatre	
2018	The Cher Show	Bookwriter	Broadway, Neil Simon Theatre	
2024	Water for Elephants	Bookwriter	Broadway, Imperial Theatre	
2025	Smash	Bookwriter	Broadway, Imperial Theatre	

== Awards and nominations ==
Award	Year	Category	Work	Result	Ref.
Tony Award	2006	Best Book of a Musical	Jersey Boys	Nominated	
Drama Desk Award	2006	Outstanding Book of a Musical	Jersey Boys	Nominated	
Outer Critics Circle Award	2006	Outstanding Book of a Musical	Jersey Boys	Won	
Tony Award	2012	Best Play	Peter and the Starcatcher	Nominated	
Tony Award	2012	Best Original Score	Peter and the Starcatcher	Nominated	
Tony Award	2024	Best Book of a Musical	Water for Elephants	Nominated	
