= A Sunday Kind of Love =

1946 pop and jazz song

"A Sunday Kind of Love" is a popular song composed by Barbara Belle, (Note: Barbara Belle (née Belle Einhorn; born 1922) is a producer, publisher, theatrical manager, and songwriter. She was married to Lee Newman (né Leon Lee Newman; 1912–1987)) Anita Leonard, (Note: Anita Leonard (née Anita Rothblum; born 1922) married – on November 29, 1948, in the Bronx – comedian actor Louis Nye (1913–2005). She earned a bachelor of science in music from NYU. She studied piano with Modena Scovill Lane (1892–1981), Bruno Eisner (1884–1978) (ru), and Herman Wasserman (1895–1957). She studied composition with Otto Cesana (1899–1980), and Wallingford Riegger. At The New School, she studied acting with Stella Adler. Her chief collaborators included Barbara Belle, Evelyn Caroll, Chocky Fair (Charles B. Fair), and Marshall Barer. Her stage-name, "Leonard," was the given name of her brother, Leonard Rothblum (1916–2001). (ASCAP Biographical Dictionary, 1980)) Stan Rhodes, (Note: Stan Rhodes (né Stanley Wayne Rhodes; 1924–1984) copyrighted over 80 songs under the name Stan Rhodes.) and Louis Prima and published in 1946.

== History ==
The song has become a pop and jazz standard, recorded by many artists. The song was first recorded by Claude Thornhill and his Orchestra on November 11, 1946. He released the song as a single in January, 1947 and it became permanently identified as the signature song for its vocalist, Fran Warren. Louis Prima and his Orchestra released his recording of the song in February 1947. The popularity of the up-tempo version by The Del-Vikings released in 1957 increased the song's popularity. Despite having wide acclaim, the song never made the Billboard Top 40.

== Legacy ==
The song was featured in the jukebox musical Jersey Boys as well as the film version.

== Notable recordings ==
- Claude Thornhill and his Orchestra with vocal by Fran Warren. Recorded on November 11, 1946, in New York, and released on Columbia Records 37219.
- Louis Prima and his Orchestra, February, 1947.
- Ella Fitzgerald and the Andy Love Quintet with an orchestra conducted by Bob Haggart. Recorded on March 19, 1947, and released on Decca Records 23866 and was included on her album For Sentimental Reasons
- Dinah Washington on her 1959 album, What a Diff'rence a Day Makes!
- Etta James on her 1960 album, At Last!
- The Marcels in 1961 on Colpix Records.
- Jan & Dean in 1962, which went to #95 on the Billboard Hot 100.
- Lenny Welch in 1972, which went to #96 on the Billboard Hot 100.
- Reba McEntire's version went to #5 on the Billboard Hot Country Singles chart and also went to #9 on the RPM Country Tracks chart in Canada, from her 1988 album, Reba.

== Certifications ==
Region	Certification	Certified units/sales
United Kingdom (BPI) Etta James' version	Silver	200,000^{‡}
^{‡} Sales+streaming figures based on certification alone.
