= C'mon Marianne =

1967 single by The Four Seasons

Single by The Four Seasons

from the album New Gold Hits
- B-side: "Let's Ride Again"
- Released: May 1967
- Genre: Pop-soul; rock and roll
- Length: 2:33
- Label: Philips
- Songwriter(s): L. Russell Brown, Raymond Bloodworth
- Producer(s): Bob Crewe

The Four Seasons singles chronology
"Beggin'" (1967)	"C'mon Marianne" (1967)	"Lonesome Road" (1967)

"C'mon Marianne"

Single by Donny Osmond

from the album Disco Train
- B-side: "Old Man Auctioneer"
- Released: May 1977
- Genre: Bubblegum pop
- Label: Kolob
- Songwriter(s): L. Russell Brown, Raymond Bloodworth
- Producer(s): Mike Curb

Donny Osmond singles chronology
"I Have a Dream" (1975)	"C'mon Marianne" (1977)	"(You've Got Me) Dangling on a String" (1977)

"C'mon Marianne" is a song composed by L. Russell Brown and Raymond Bloodworth and popularized by The Four Seasons in 1967. Produced by Bob Crewe, the single was the last Four Seasons single to reach the Top Ten of the Billboard Hot 100 chart in the 1960s, and their last Top Ten hit until "Who Loves You" in 1975.

"C'mon Marianne" hit the charts less than a month after lead singer Frankie Valli's "solo" (with Four Seasons participation) hit, "Can't Take My Eyes Off You", hit No. 2. Originally on the New Gold Hits album, a different version of the song was distributed on promotional singles distributed to disk jockeys and released commercially, but when people did not react positively to a recording that was slower than and mixed differently from the "more familiar" LP version, the single was replaced with the album version. Ultimately, "C'mon Marianne" reached the No. 9 position on the Hot 100.

This song begins with Acapella in B-Flat Major, with the first verse beginning in G Minor. After the repeated refrains, which ends in a descending vocal repeat of "Marianne", making it sound like a psychedelic song, the key of the song descends to the second verse that begins in F-Sharp Minor, with the repeated refrains in A Major, before the song's fade out.

Cash Box called it an "infectious, fast-moving toe-tapper."

The song sported a riff which The Doors also appropriated in their 1968 single "Touch Me".

In the following year, 1968, the song was covered by Grapefruit, a London-based group headed by Glaswegian George Alexander (b. Alexander Young), who was the older brother of George Young (from The Easybeats) and of Malcolm and Angus Young of AC/DC. The single, their third, also appeared on their first album, Around Grapefruit (1968).

In 1976, Donny Osmond recorded "C'mon Marianne" (with the Osmond Brothers providing backing vocals) and it was released on his album Disco Train as well as the Donny and Marie album Featuring Songs from Their Television Show. The song reached No. 38 on the Billboard Hot 100 and No. 25 on the magazine's Easy Listening chart.

Songwriter L. Russell Brown would compose (or co-compose) a string of hit records in the 1970s, including several recorded by Dawn featuring Tony Orlando.

== Chart history ==
=== Weekly charts ===
The Four Seasons

Chart (1967)	Peak position
Canada RPM Top Singles	8
New Zealand (Listener)	20
U.S. Billboard Hot 100	9
U.S. Cash Box Top 100	9

Donny Osmond

Chart (1977)	Peak position
U.S. Billboard Hot 100	38
U.S. Billboard Adult Contemporary	25
U.S. Cash Box Top 100	--
Canada RPM Top 100	40

=== Year-end charts ===
Chart (1967)	Rank
Canada	73
U.S. Cash Box	86
