= John Lloyd Young =

American actor (born 1975)

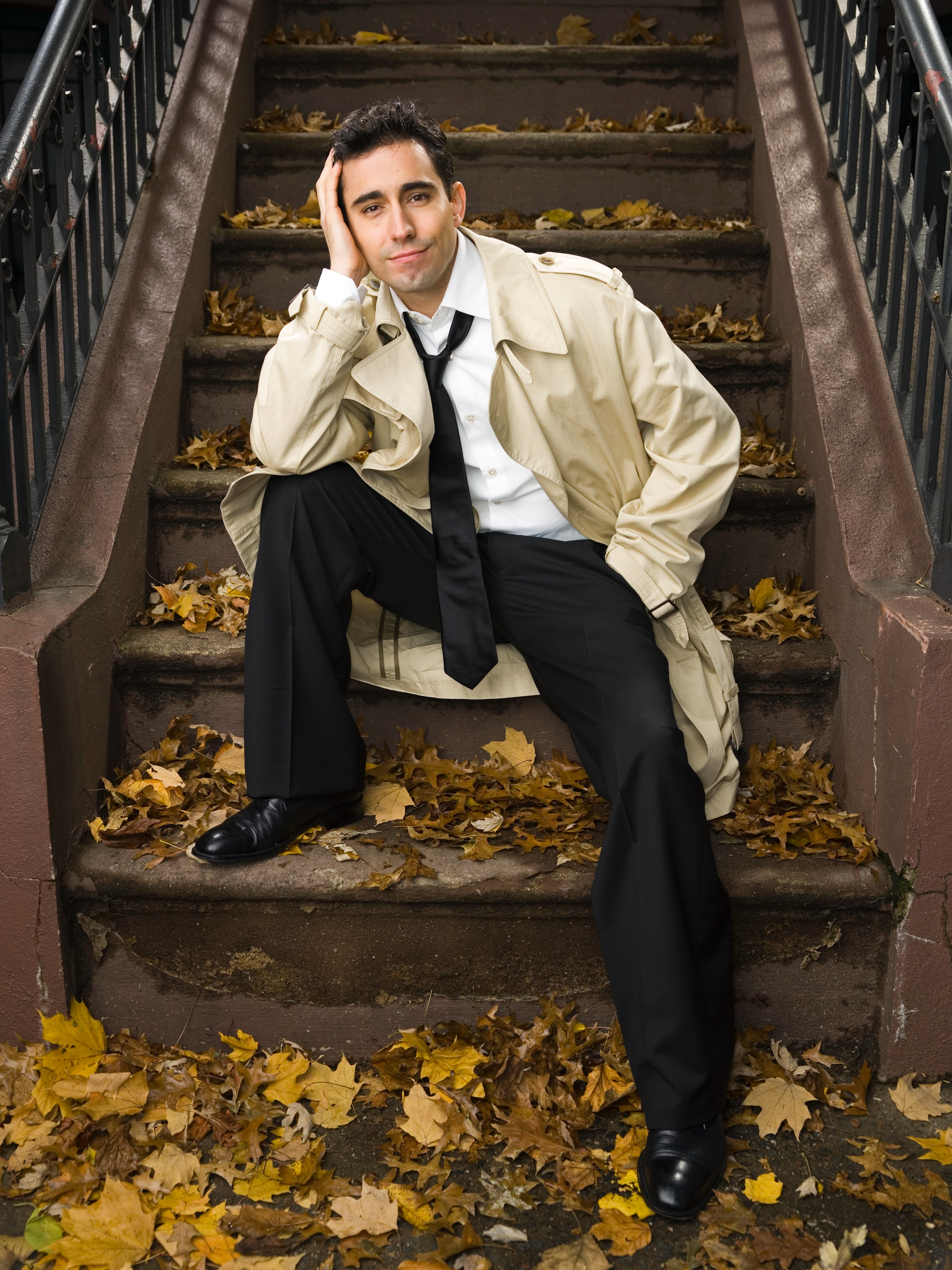
- Young in 2006
- Born: John Lloyd Mills Young; July 4, 1975 (age 50); Sacramento, California, U.S.
- Education: Brown University
- Occupations: Actor; singer
- Years active: 2002–present
- Website: johnlloydyoung.com

John Lloyd Mills Young (born July 4, 1975) is an American actor. In 2006, he won the Tony Award for Best Actor in a Musical for his role as Frankie Valli in Broadway's Jersey Boys. He is the only American actor to date to have received a Lead Actor in a Musical Tony, Drama Desk, Outer Critics Circle and Theatre World Award for a Broadway debut. Young sang lead vocals on the Grammy Award-winning Jersey Boys cast album, certified Platinum by the Recording Industry Association of America. Young reprised his role as Frankie Valli in Warner Brothers' film adaptation of Jersey Boys, directed and produced by Clint Eastwood and released June 20, 2014.

Young was appointed by President Barack Obama to the President's Committee on the Arts and Humanities. He was sworn in by Supreme Court Justice Elena Kagan on November 21, 2013. He resigned from the President's Committee in August 2017, co-signing a letter of resignation that said in reference to President Trump, "Ignoring your hateful rhetoric would have made us complicit in your words and actions."

== Early life ==
Young was born in Sacramento, California, the son of Rosemarie Joan (Cianciola) and Karl Bruce Young, a Strategic Air Command tanker-squadron commander. His mother died when he was two years old. His father had English, Welsh and German ancestry, and his mother was of Italian descent. He was raised partly in Plattsburgh, New York, attending Plattsburgh High School and acting in their drama department. He is a graduate of Brown University.

== Career ==
After moving to New York City, Young worked his way up through the ranks of the theater scene with roles in numerous regional and off-Broadway plays, including the New York-area premiere of Michael Healey's The Drawer Boy with actor John Mahoney; "Charlie" in Julia Jordan's The Summer of the Swans; "Moritz" in the Douglas Langworthy translation of Wedekind's Spring Awakening; and "Claudio" in Rinne Groff's The Five Hysterical Girls Theorem for the Target Margin Theatre.

He was named one of the Best Featured Actors in a Play by the New Jersey Star-Ledger as "Danny Saunders" in Aaron Posner and Chaim Potok's dramatic adaptation of Potok's book, The Chosen, opposite Theodore Bikel, directed by David Ellenstein.

He failed to land the part of Frankie Valli in the pre-Broadway run of Jersey Boys, but a year later and after several more auditions, he was asked to headline the show on Broadway, where he played the role for over two years. During his tenure at Jersey Boys, which now has several companies playing worldwide, Young performed at the White House, Carnegie Hall, Radio City Music Hall, the New York City Marathon, New Year's Eve in Times Square, Yankee Stadium and Macy's Thanksgiving Day Parade. Young's run with Jersey Boys concluded on November 9, 2007, followed shortly thereafter by a sold-out-in-a-day solo concert debut at Lincoln Center.

After moving to Los Angeles, Young starred as Marius in an all-star production of Les Misérables at the Hollywood Bowl and was the first guest star invited to appear on Glee.

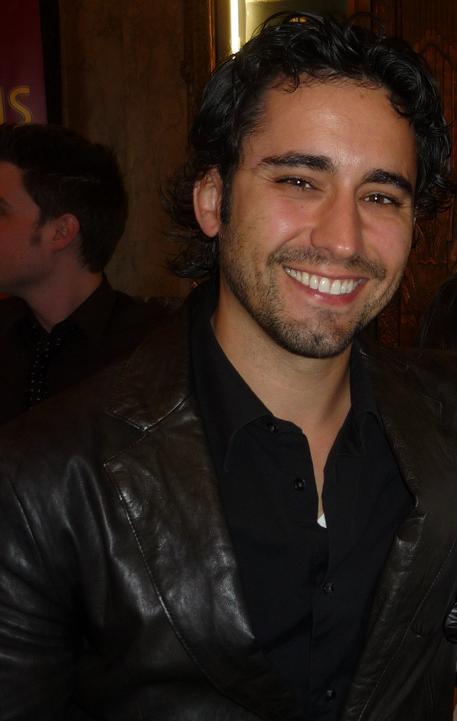
Young in 2010

Young debuted his visual art in May 2010 in "Food for Thought", a show benefiting AIDS Project Los Angeles, at Willis Wonderland, the home of Young's friend, Grammy-winning songwriter Allee Willis. Young's art is represented by Hollywood's Hamilton-Selway Fine Art Gallery. His first art commission was for famed Beverly Hills, CA, restaurant, Spago.

Young's debut album, "My Turn...", was released on July 3, 2012. The album was executive-produced by Dona R. Miller and Young's Under the Skyway Productions, with production from Tommy Faragher of FOX's hit show, Glee, whose cover of "Teenage Dream" was the first song from the show to reach NO. 1 on the Billboard Charts. The album was expanded and re-released with eight new tracks in 2014.

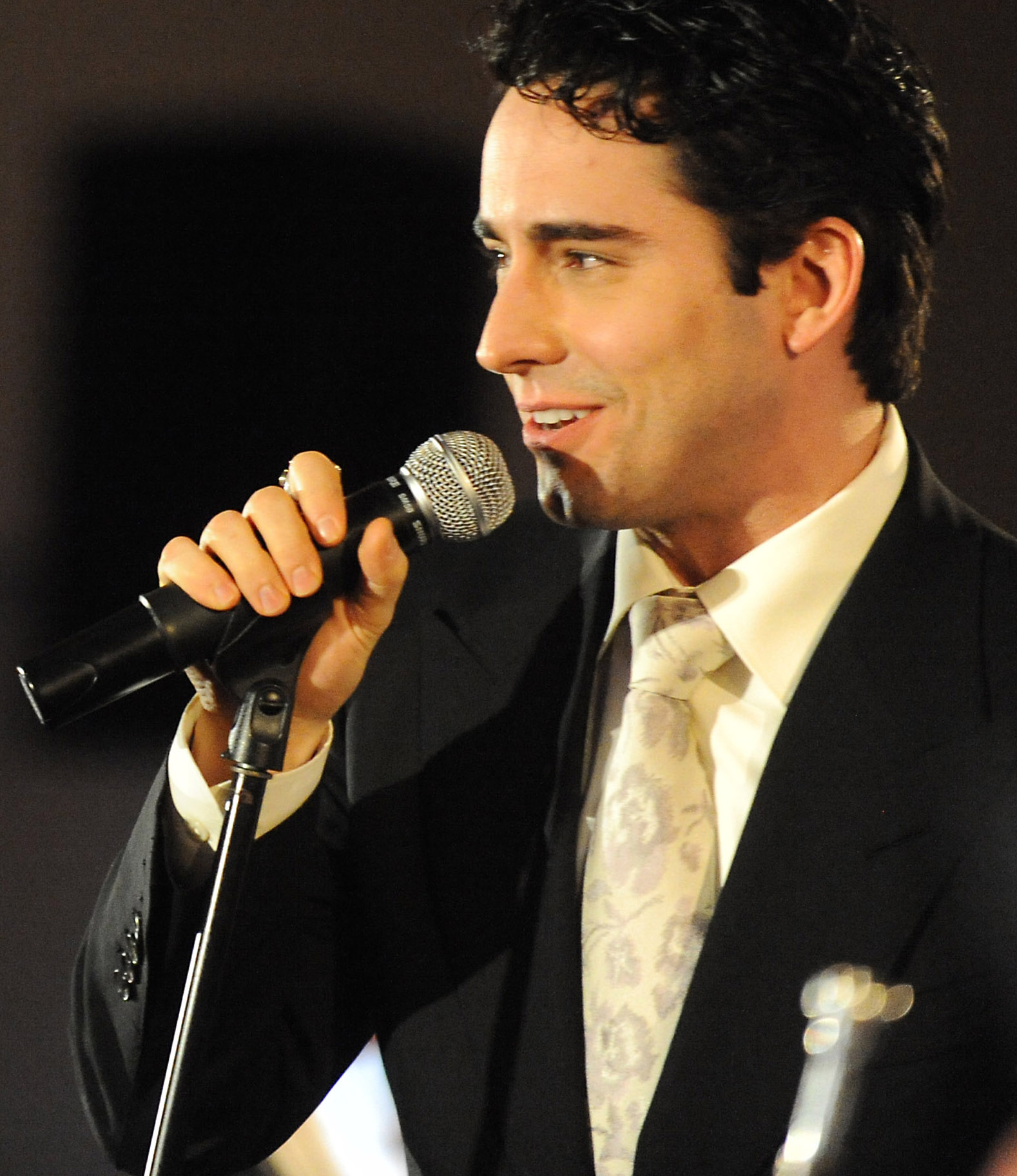
Young at the USO of Metropolitan Washington's 31st Annual Awards Dinner, 2012

He made his debut at New York's Cafe Carlyle in February 2013. Young reprised his Frankie Valli role in the Broadway production of Jersey Boys from July 3 - September 30, 2012. In March 2014, Young made his West End Theatre debut, starring in the musical's London production. He reprised the role in director Clint Eastwood's film adaptation of Jersey Boys, which was released in June 2014.

Young's extensive charity work includes frequent appearances with and support of Broadway Cares/Equity Fights AIDS, Cystic Fibrosis Foundation, amfAR, Paul Newman's Hole in the Wall Gang, AIDS Project Los Angeles and the United Service Organization (USO). Young has been a member of the American Civil Liberties Union since 1995.

He is a practitioner and student of Chinese Chan Buddhism.

== Filmography ==
- Glee (2009)
- Oy Vey! My Son Is Gay!! (2009)
- Jersey Boys (2014)

== Awards and nominations ==
=== Tony Awards ===
- Winner - 2006 Best Actor in a Musical Jersey Boys

=== Drama Desk Awards ===
- Winner - 2006 Best Actor in a Musical Jersey Boys

=== Outer Critics Circle Awards ===
- Winner - 2006 Best Actor in a Musical Jersey Boys

=== Theatre World Awards ===
- Winner - 2006 Outstanding Broadway Debut Jersey Boys

=== Grammy Awards ===
- Winner - 2006 Best Show Album Jersey Boys

=== Drama League Award ===
- Nomination - 2006 Performer of the Year Jersey Boys
