= Madcon discography =

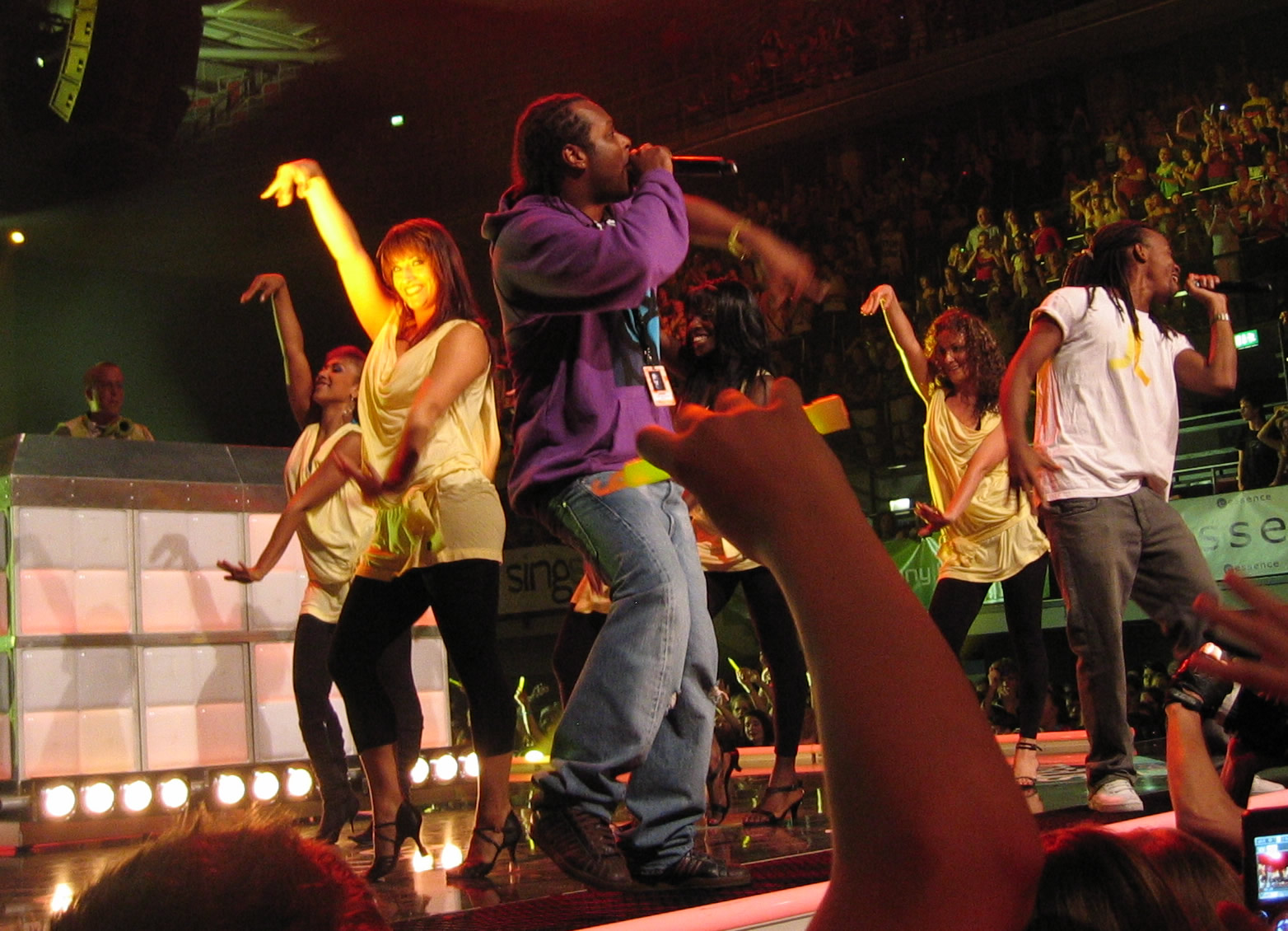
- Madcon performing at the German music television show "The Dome 46" in 2008
- Studio albums: 7
- Compilation albums: 1
- Singles: 18

The discography of Norwegian urban duo Madcon consists of seven studio albums, eighteen singles and one compilation album.

== Albums ==
=== Studio albums ===
Title	Details	Peak chart positions					Certifications
Title	Details	NOR	BEL (WA)	FRA	GER	UK	Certifications
It's All a Madcon	Released: 2004	—	—	—	—	—	
So Dark the Con of Man	Released: 3 December 2007; Label: RCA	3	30	11	45	137	SNEP: Silver; NFPF: Gold
An InCONvenient Truth	Released: 2 December 2008; Label: Bonnier Amigo Music Norway AS	8	—	—	—	—	
Contraband	Released: 3 December 2010; Label: Columbia/Sony Music	2	—	—	77	—	
Contakt	Released: 21 June 2012; Label: Cosmos	4	—	—	—	—	
Icon	Released: 11 August 2013; Label: Sony Music	1	—	—	96	—	
Contakt Vol. 2	Released: 9 March 2018; Label: Sony Music	36	—	—	—	—	
"—" denotes album that did not chart or was not released in that territory.

=== Compilation albums ===
Title	Details
CONquest	Compilation album; Released: 2009; Label: Cosmos/Universal Republic

== Singles ==
=== As lead artist ===
Title	Year	Peak chart positions										Certifications	Album
Title	Year	NOR	AUT	BEL	FRA	GER	IRE	NLD	SWI	UK	US	Certifications	Album
2000	"O.C (Oslo City)"	—	—	—	—	—	—	—	—	—	—		Non-album singles
2000	"God Forgive Me"	—	—	—	—	—	—	—	—	—	—		Non-album singles
2004	"Doo-Wop"	11	—	—	—	—	—	—	—	—	—		It's All a Madcon
2004	"Infidelity" (featuring Sofian)	18	—	—	—	—	—	—	—	—	—		It's All a Madcon
2008	"Beggin'"	1	7	1	1	7	8	1	5	5	79	BEA: Gold; BPI: 2× Platinum; BVMI: Gold; SNEP: Gold	So Dark the Con of Man
2008	"Back on the Road" (featuring Paperboys)	6	—	—	—	66	—	—	—	—	—		So Dark the Con of Man
2008	"Liar"	2	—	—	—	65	—	—	—	—	—		an inCONvenient truth
2010	"Glow"	1	14	70	—	4	12	59	25	70	—	IFPI NOR: 8× Platinum; BVMI: Platinum; IFPI AUT: Gold	Contraband
2010	"Freaky Like Me" (featuring Ameerah)	1	11	62	—	9	—	—	6	46	—	IFPI NOR: 4× Platinum; BVMI: Gold; IFPI AUT: Gold	Contraband
2010	"Outrun the Sun" (featuring Maad*Moiselle)	11	20	—	—	27	—	—	—	—	—		Contraband
2011	"Helluva Nite" (featuring Maad*Moiselle & Itchy)	10	—	—	—	29	—	—	—	—	—		Contraband
2012	"Kjører på" (featuring Timbuktu)	14	—	—	—	—	—	—	—	—	—		Contakt
2012	"Fest på Smedstad vest" (featuring Tina & Bettina)	12	—	—	—	—	—	—	—	—	—		Contakt
2012	"Fåkke fly bort" (featuring Maria Mena)	—	—	—	—	—	—	—	—	—	—		Contakt
2012	"Å Lø"	—	—	—	—	—	—	—	—	—	—		Contakt
2013	"In My Head"	2	—	—	—	—	—	—	—	—	—	IFPI NOR: 2× Platinum	Icon
2013	"One Life" (featuring Kelly Rowland)	11	9	57	—	6	—	—	37	—	—	IFPI NOR: 2× Platinum; BVMI: Gold	Icon
2013	"The Signal"	—	—	—	—	54	—	—	—	—	—		Icon
2013	"Say Yeah" (featuring Stori)	—	—	—	—	—	—	—	—	—	—		Icon
2015	"Don't Worry" (featuring Ray Dalton)	4	2	10	2	3	63	10	8	54	—	IFPI NOR: 4× Platinum; BPI: Silver; BVMI: Platinum; IFPI AUT: Gold	Non-album singles
2016	"Keep My Cool"	—	60	—	—	63	—	—	—	—	—		Non-album singles
2016	"Don't Stop Loving Me" (featuring KDL)	—	—	—	—	—	—	—	—	—	—		Non-album singles
2017	"Got a Little Drunk"	38	—	—	—	—	—	—	—	—	—		Non-album singles
2019	"Colling You"	—	—	—	—	—	—	—	—	—	—		Non-album singles
2019	"Shine On" (featuring R.I.O.)	—	—	—	—	—	—	—	—	—	—		Non-album singles
2019	"No Lies" (featuring Jesper Jenset)	—	—	—	—	—	—	—	—	—	—		Non-album singles
"—" denotes single that did not chart or was not released in that territory.

=== As featured artist ===
Title	Year	Peak chart positions		Album
Title	Year	NOR	SWE	Album
2002	"Barcelona" (Paperboys featuring Madcon)	7	—	Paperboys' album No Cure For Life
2009	"Keep Talking" (Tommy Tee featuring Madcon & Alee)	—	—	
2011	"TAG" (Lazee featuring Madcon & Julimar)	—	—	
2012	"Sunrise" (Alexandra Joner featuring Madcon)	8	—	
2012	"How Far" (Daco Junior featuring Madcon)	—	—	Daco Junior's album Heartbeat Solo
2015	"The Wave" (Matoma featuring Madcon)	—	—	
2016	"Limousine" (Christopher featuring Madcon)	—	69	
2016	"Girls" (Marcus & Martinus featuring Madcon)	1	62	Together
2016	"Cigarette" (Penthox featuring Madcon & Julimar Santos)	34	—	Non-album single
"—" denotes single that did not chart or was not released in that territory.
