= Tshawe Baqwa =

Norwegian musician (born 1980)

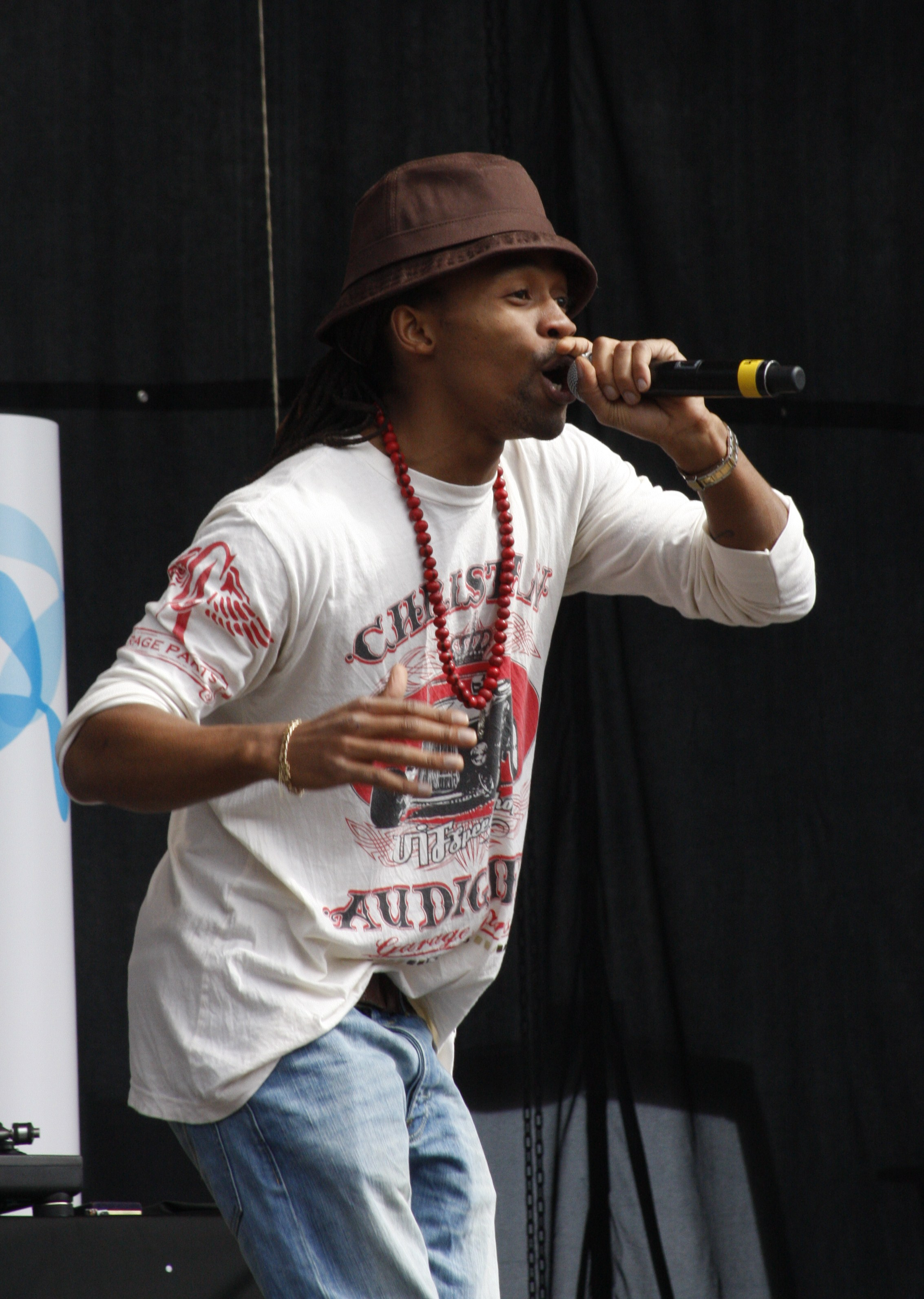
- Baqwa in 2010
- Born: Tshawe Shoore Baqwa; 6 January 1980 (age 46); Saarbrücken, Germany
- Other name: Kapricon
- Citizenship: South Africa; Germany; Norway
- Occupations: Musician; singer; songwriter; rapper; voice actor; TV presenter
- Years active: 1992–present
- Musical career
- Origin: Oslo, Norway
- Genre: Hip hop
- Instrument: Vocals
- Labels: Cosmos; Columbia; Sony; Nasty Kutt; Bonnier Amigo Music Norway AS; RCA; Universal Republic; Warner; Just
- Member of: Madcon

Tshawe Shoore Baqwa (born 6 January 1980), known professionally as Kapricon, is a singer, voice actor and television presenter based in Norway. Born in Germany to South African parents, he mainly grew up in Norway and settled there. He is one of the two members of Norwegian hip hop duo Madcon along with Yosef Wolde-Mariam.

== Personal life ==
Born in Saarbrücken, Saarland, to a South African parents, Baqwa holds South African, German, and Norwegian citizenships. The family moved to Norway when he was six months old. He grew up in Stavanger and Oslo before moving to South Africa at the age of 14. However, he later chose to return to Norway on his own.

Baqwa grew up in academic family where both of his parents were physicians. Baqwa took no formal education and was set on being an entertainer from a young age. Growing up, he idolized his older brother, who ended up struggling with drug addiction. That story was reflected in the Madcon single "Sire som det er". Baqwa's younger sister Nosizwe also became a performer. He had a daughter born in the mid-2010s.

Tshawe Baqwa openly told about his own drug experimentation, in part instigated by the death of close friends. In the 1990s, Tshawe Baqwa was convicted in lesser cases of robbery and narcotics. He was in practice homeless for stretches of time, crashing with friends and one night stands. He developed deep friendships with other people that made it in the music industry, most notably his "soulmate" Vinni. In 2011 he was suspected for driving without a license, having borrowed a Lamborghini that caught fire and was totalled outside a McDonald's. He defended himself with this being a legal practise drive.

== Television ==
Baqwa won the third season of Skal vi danse? (Dancing With the Stars) in 2007. Although he received fewer points from the judges than the runner-up, Mona Grudt, he won the public vote and was hence declared winner. Wrote Dagbladet, "Tshawe is the hip hopper who has won the entire kingdom with his amazing charm". His participation was one of the markers of hip hop becoming mainstream in Norway. It also had an element of greater acceptance of ethnic minorities, with Baqwa calling himself a "black viking".

With Wolde-Mariam, Baqwa hosted a show on The Voice TV. Following their success, the concept changed to The Voice of Madcon, a reality format where a TV crew followed the two men in their doings. In 2008, they were picked up by TV 2 to present the program Kan du teksten?, similar to Don't Forget the Lyrics!. VG tied the move to Norway's second largest TV channel to Tshawe Baqwa's Skal vi danse victory.

In 2017 he participated in Hver gang vi møtes, a program where an ensemble of performers covered each others' songs. He was also a part of the 2020 edition, a "reunion" season with previous participants.

In 2018 Baqwa sat on the judges' panel in Idol together with Gunnar Greve and Silje Larsen Borgan.

== Voice artist ==
Baqwa voiced Monkey in Kung Fu Panda and Kung Fu Panda 2.

He also voiced the character Nico in the children's animated movie Rio.

== Discography ==
=== Albums ===
==== As Madcon ====
- It's All a Madcon (2004)
- So Dark the Con of Man (2007)
- An InCONvenient Truth (2008)
- Contraband (2010)
- Contakt (2012)
- Icon (2013)
- Contakt Vol. 2 (2018)
