= Kim Ofstad =

Norwegian drummer (born 1969)

- Born: 25 November 1969 (age 56); Trondheim, Sør-Trøndelag
- Origin: Norway
- Genres: Jazz, pop music
- Occupations: Musician, composer
- Instrument: Drums
- Label: ECM Records Universal Sony Atlantic Warner
- Website: www.sonor.com/artists/kim-ofstad

Kim Ofstad (born 25 November 1969) is a Norwegian drummer. He is best known from collaborations in the pop/soul band D'Sound where he was a member from its inception in 1993 to 2010 and his work with the production team Element.

== Career ==
Ofstad was born in Trondheim. He got his first drum kit when he was eight years old, and slightly older joined a brass band. He describes his teens as hybridic, as he felt equally at home in jazz clubs as in discothèques. He is a graduate of Heimdal videregående skole where he got his Examen artium in 1988, and studied music at Berklee College of Music in Boston, whence he moved to Oslo, the capital of Norway, in 1991. Here he formed D'Sound (1993) together with Jonny Sjo, a fellow student from Boston, he played with Sofian Benzaim. Ofstad contributed for some time in Knut Værnes Trio, and has also recorded an album with Ab und Zu (1996) winning the Smuget award the year after (1997). Together with Audun Kleive he constituted a plain drum duet in 2008.

Ofstad was the drummer and drum-programmer of the production duo ELEMENT with producer/composer Hitesh Ceon, before the team was disbanded in January 2016. Until 2008 the team also included Jonny Sjo and was named 3Elementz. Their productions include the hit singles "Beggin'", "Glow" and "In My Head" with Madcon as well as the album An InCONvenient Truth, they have also produced and written songs for artists like Cee Lo Green, Musiq Soulchild, Alexandra Burke, Snoop Dogg, Rick Ross and reproduced two tracks with Michael Jackson for Motown Records.

== Grammy Awards ==
Year	Nominee / work	Award	Result
2010
2010	CeeLo Green The Lady Killer	Best Pop Vocal Album	Nominated

== Discography ==
With the trio Værnes/Ofstad/Berg

- 1995: Jacques Tati (Curling Legs)

With D'Sound

- 1996: Spice of Life (PolyGram)
- 1998: Beauty Is a Blessing (PolyGram)
- 2001: Talkin' Talk (Virgin Records)
- 2003: Doublehearted (Da Works)
- 2005: My Today (Edel Records)
- 2009: Starts and Ends (FarGo Musc)

With Sofian Benzaim

- 2005: This Is Sofian (C+C Records)

With Eivind Aarset

- 1998: Électronique Noire (Jazzland, EmArcy)

Awards
Preceded by Arild Stav and Lise Voldsdal	Recipient of the Studio musician Gammleng-prisen; 2014	Succeeded by David Wallumrød and Torstein Lofthus
