= In My Head (Madcon song) =

2013 single by Madcon

Single by Madcon

from the album Icon
- Released: 4 February 2013
- Recorded: 2012–13
- Genre: Pop; dance
- Length: 4:05
- Label: Sony Music Entertainment
- Songwriter(s): Yosef Wolde-Mariam, Tshawe Baqwa, Taj Jackson, Hitesh Ceon, Kim Ofstad
- Producer(s): Element

Madcon singles chronology
"Fest på Smedstad vest" (2012)	"In My Head" (2013)	"One Life" (2013)

"In My Head" is a song by Norwegian band Madcon. The song was released in Norway on 4 February 2013 as the lead single from their sixth studio album Icon (2013). The song spent several weeks at number 1 on iTunes, peaked at number 2 on the VG Top 40 chart Norway, and has reached double platinum status. The song is produced by ELEMENT.

== Music video ==
A music video to accompany the release of "In My Head" was first released onto YouTube on 5 February 2013 at a total length of four minutes and fifty-one seconds. The video was directed by Ray Kay.

== Track listing ==
Digital download
No.	Title	Length
1.	"In My Head"	4:05

== Chart performance ==
Chart (2013)	Peak position
Norway (VG-lista)	2

== Release history ==
Country	Release date	Format	Label
Norway	4 February 2013	Digital download	Sony Music Entertainment
