= Contraband (Madcon album) =

Studio album by Madcon
- Released: 17 November 2010
- Recorded: 2010
- Genre: Pop, electropop
- Label: Cosmos, Columbia, Sony Music Nasty Kutt
- Producer: Jonas Jeberg, TJ Oosterhuis, Sha DreamRoc'a, Nasty Kutt, StarGate, Element

Madcon chronology
An InCONvenient Truth (2008)	Contraband (2010)	Contakt (2012)

Singles from Contraband
- 1. "Glow" Released: 30 May 2010; 2. "Freaky Like Me" Released: 20 September 2010; 3. "Outrun the Sun" Released: 20 September 2010; 4. "Helluva Nite" Released: 7 September 2011

Contraband is the fourth studio album by the Norwegian urban music duo Madcon. It was released on 17 November 2010. It peaked at number two on the Norwegian Albums Chart, becoming the group's highest-charting album. The album was preceded by the Element-produced lead single, "Glow" which became a top 20-hit in nine countries.

== Singles ==
- "Glow" was released on 30 May 2010 as the first single from the album. It peaked at number one in Norway. Madcon performed the song during the Eurovision Song Contest 2010 Grand Final interval in Oslo, Norway.
- "Freaky Like Me" was released on 20 September 2010. It features the Belgian singer Ameerah. The song peaked at number one in Norway, becoming the group's third number-one single. It also reached number forty-six in the United Kingdom.
- "Outrun the Sun" was released on 19 November 2010. It features the American singer Maad*Moiselle. The song peaked at number eleven in Norway and at number twenty-seven in Germany.
- "Helluva Nite" was released on 7 September 2011. It features the American singer Maad*Moiselle. Even though Ludacris is featured on the album, Madcon decided not to put him in the single. For the release in Germany a part of the singer/rapper Itchy from the German band Culcha Candela was added instead.

== Track listing ==
No.	Title	Writer(s)	Producer(s)	Length
1.	"Outrun the Sun" (featuring Maad*Moiselle)	Tshawe Baqwa, Yosef Wolde-Mariam, Terence Abney, Marcella Brailsford, Jonas Jeberg	Jonas Jeberg	3:12
2.	"Helluva Nite" (featuring Ludacris and Maad*Moiselle)	Baqwa, Wolde-Mariam, Marcus John Bryant, Nakisha Smith, Jeberg	Jonas Jeberg	3:29
3.	"Freaky Like Me" (featuring Ameerah)	Baqwa, Wolde-Mariam, Ameerah Ouiglani, TJ Oosterhuis, Arjang "Sha" Shishegar	TJ Oosterhuis, Sha DreamRoc'a	3:09
4.	"Worldshaker"	Baqwa, Wolde-Mariam, Terence Abney, Marcella Brailsford, Jeberg, Ole Brodersen, Kasper Larsen	Jonas Jeberg	3:23
5.	"Be Mine"	Baqwa, Wolde-Mariam, William Wiik Larsen	Nasty Kutt	3:30
6.	"Do What You Do" (featuring Ne-Yo)	Baqwa, Wolde-Mariam, Mikkel S. Eriksen, Tor Erik Hermansen	StarGate	3:52
7.	"All I Do"	Baqwa, Wolde-Mariam, Hitesh Ceon, Kim Ofstad	Element	3:33
8.	"Walk Out the Door"	Baqwa, Wolde-Mariam, W. Larsen	Nasty Kutt	3:23
9.	"Share My Sky"	Baqwa, Wolde-Mariam, Wayne Hector, Lucas Secon, Jeberg	Jonas Jeberg	3:30
10.	"One"	Baqwa, Wolde-Mariam, Terence Abney, Marcella Brailsford, Jeberg,, K. Larsen, Brodersen	Jonas Jeberg	3:34
11.	"Cliché"	Hitesh Ceon, Kim Ofstad, Yosef Wolde-Mariam, Tshawe Baqwa, Orji Okoroafor	Element	3:36
12.	"Glow"	Baqwa, Wolde-Mariam, Ceon, Ofstad	Element	3:49

International edition bonus track
No.	Title	Writer(s)	Producer(s)	Length
13.	"Beggin'"	Bob Gaudio, Peggy Farina	Element	3:37

iTunes Deluxe Version bonus tracks
No.	Title	Writer(s)	Length
14.	"Turn Me Loose"	Baqwa, Wolde-Mariam, Ofstad, Helgi Mar Hübner	3:41
15.	"Electric"	Baqwa, Wolde-Mariam, Ofstad, Hübner	3:51

== Charts ==
Chart (2010)	Peak position
Norwegian Albums Chart	2
Polish Albums Chart	100

== Release history ==
Region	Release date	Format	Label
Norway	1 November 2010	Digital download	Cosmos Music Norway AS
Finland	1 November 2010	Digital download	Cosmos Music Norway AS
United States	17 November 2010	CD	Cosmos Music Norway AS
Germany	3 December 2010	CD	Columbia/Sony Music
Norway	3 December 2010	CD	Columbia/Sony Music
