= Colour of Love =

Colour of Love or variants may refer to:

== Books ==
- Colours of Love: An Exploration of the Ways of Loving, a 1973 book by John Alan Lee about the colour wheel theory of love
- The Color of Love (manga), a Japanese manga written and illustrated by Kiyo Ueda
- The Color of Love (book), a 2015 book by sociologist Elizabeth Hordge-Freeman
- The Color of Love, a 1995 novel by Sandra Kitt
- The Color of Love, a 2017 romance novel by Radclyffe
- The Colours of Love, a 2015 romance novel by Rita Bradshaw

== Film and TV ==
- The Color of Love: Jacey's Story, a 2000 American drama television film
- The Color of Love, a 1991 film with Marlene Forte and Isaiah Washington
- Homage to Chagall: The Colours of Love, a 1977 Canadian documentary film about artist Marc Chagall
- Colours of Love, a 2007 TV series with Hong Kong cantopop trio HotCha

== Music ==
- The Colors of Love, a 1960s band which included singer Elaine Paige
- Colors of Love, a children's choir on the Kenny Loggins album Leap of Faith

=== Albums ===
- Colours of Love, a 1970 album by Hugo Montenegro
- Colors of Love (Kelly Chen album), 1999
- Colors of Love (Chanticleer album), 1999
- Colour of Love, a 2010 album by Sam Moran
- Colors of Love, a 2007 EP by Mao Denda
- Colors of Love, a 2009 album by Peaches & Herb
- The Colour of Love, a 1997 album by Ronnie Earl
- The Colour of My Love, a 1993 album by Céline Dion

=== Songs ===
- "Colour of Love" (Snap! song), 1991
- "The Colour of Love", a Billy Ocean song from Tear Down These Walls
- "The Colour of Love" (The Reese Project song), 1992
- The Color of Love (song), a 2002 song by Boyz II Men
- "Colours of Love" (Vicky Leandros song), a version of "L'amour est bleu"
- "Colours of Love", a song by One Horse Blue from One Horse Blue
- "Colours of Love", a song by Albion Band from Albion Heart
- "Colors of Love", a 1993 song by Lisa Fischer
- "Colors of Love", a 1972 song by Beverly Bremers from I'll Make You Music
- "Color of Love", a song by Red Velvet from Bloom
