= Back on the Road =

Back on the Road may refer to:

- "Back on the Road" (Madcon song), 2008
- "Back on the Road" (Earth, Wind & Fire song), 1980

== See also ==
- "Back on Road", a song by Gucci Mane, 2016
