= Fest på Smedstad vest =

Single by Madcon featuring Tina & Bettina

from the album Contakt
- Released: 17 August 2012
- Recorded: 2012
- Genre: Pop
- Length: 3:43
- Label: Cosmos
- Songwriter(s): Tshawe Baqwa * Bjoerner Lunder Bredvold: Lars Pedersen

Madcon singles chronology
"Kjører på" (2012)	"Fest på Smedstad vest" (2012)	"In My Head" (2013)

"Fest på Smedstad vest" is a 2012 single by Norwegian band Madcon featuring vocals from Tina & Bettina. It is taken from the Madcon album Contakt that was released on 21 June 2012. The song peaked at number 12 on the Norwegian Singles Chart.

== Music video ==
A music video to accompany the release of "Fest på Smedstad vest" was first released onto YouTube on 17 August 2012 with a total length of three minutes and forty-six seconds. The video was directed by Slaughterhouse.

== Track listing ==
Digital download
No.	Title	Length
1.	"Fest på Smedstad vest" (feat. Tina & Bettina)	3:43

== Chart performance ==
Chart (2012)	Peak position
Norway (VG-lista)	12

== Release history ==
Country	Release date	Format(s)	Label
Norway	August 17, 2012	Digital download	Cosmos
