= Alexandra Joner =

- Born: 25 March 1990 (age 36); Norway
- Origin: Oslo, Norway
- Genres: Pop; dance; trap; dancehall
- Occupations: Singer; dancer; television personality
- Years active: 2012–present
- Labels: MindCode; Universal Music Group

Alexandra Irena Acevedo Joner (born 25 March 1990), professionally known as Alexandra Joner, is a Norwegian singer, dancer, and television personality. She is the daughter of Norwegian musician and composer Sverre Indris Joner and a Cuban mother Barbara Joner. She additionally is the niece of actor Johannes Joner and cousin of actors Knut Joner and Kristoffer Joner.

Joner debuted with her single "Sunrise", released in Norway on 4 May 2012 via production team ELEMENT/MindCode Records and Universal Music Norway. The song reached number one on the sales chart for Platekompaniet, and peaked at number eight on the Norwegian Singles Chart. The song features vocals from Madcon. In 2007, Joner was a contestant on the Norwegian version of So You Think You Can Dance called Dansefeber.

== Music career ==
=== 2012-present: debut single ===
Joner debuted with her single "Sunrise", released in Norway on 4 May 2012 via production team ELEMENT/MindCode Records and Universal Music Norway. The song reached number one on the sales chart for Platekompaniet, and peaked at number eight on the Norwegian Singles Chart. The song reached triple platinum status. The song features vocals from Norwegian dance/hip hop duo, Madcon.

Joner was announced as a contestant in Melodi Grand Prix 2022 with the song "Hasta la vista" on 10 January 2022.

== Skal vi danse ==
In 2023, Joner was crowned the winner of the 19th season of Skal vi danse, the Norwegian version of Dancing with the Stars, alongside professional dancer Ole Thomas Hansen. The pair defeated actor Aslak Maurstad and his dance partner Marianne Sandaker in the final.

Summary
Week no.	Dance	Song	Judges' scores	Total	Result
1	Jive	"Can't Tame Her"	8 + 9 + 9	26	No elimination
2	Foxtrot	"Flowers"	9 + 10 + 9	28	Safe
3	Samba	"Beautiful Liar"	7 + 8 + 8	23	Safe
4	Cha Cha Cha	"Barbie Girl"	10 + 10 + 10	30	Safe
5	Bhangra	"Jogi"	9 + 10 + 10	29	Safe
6	Salsa	"Maria"	9 + 10 + 10	29	Safe
7	Viennese waltz	"La Valse d'Amélie"	10 + 9 + 10	29	Safe
8	Pasodoble	"Uccen"	10 + 10 + 10	30	Safe
9	Rumba	"Colors of the Wind"	10 + 10 + 10	30	Safe
10	Modern	"Vampire"	9 + 9 + 9	27	Duel - safe
11	Tango	"Santa Maria (Effecter)"	10 + 10 + 10	30	Semi-final
11	Jive	"These Boots Are Made for Walkin'"	10 + 10 + 10	30	Semi-final (safe)
12	Viennese waltz	"It's a Man's Man's World"	10 + 10 + 10	30	Final
12	Cha Cha Cha	"Barbie Girl"	10 + 10 + 10	30	Final
12	Show dance	"Ameksa (District 78 Remix)"	10 + 10 + 10	30	Winner

== Love Island ==
Since 2024, Joner has been the host of Love Island Norge. She debuted as host in the series third season.

== Personal life ==
Joner was in a relationship with investor Runar Vatne for ten years, before their separation in 2023. In March 2025, Joner went public on her relationship with Joachim Lindbo. In April 2026, Joner and partner Lindbo welcomed their first child, a girl, with Joner announcing the birth on Snapchat.

== Discography ==
=== Singles ===
Year	Title	Chart position	Certifications	Album
Year	Title	NOR	Certifications	Album
2012	"Sunrise" (featuring Madcon)	8		Non-album singles
2012	"Come Inside Me"	–		Non-album singles
2013	"Next To You"	–		Non-album singles
2014	"Tap Dance"	–		Non-album singles
2015	"Cinderella"	4		Non-album singles
2016	"Bottoms Up" (featuring Mohombi)	–	IFPI NOR: Gold	Non-album singles
2017	"Kilimanjaro"	–	IFPI NOR: Gold	Non-album singles
2018	"Chico (Love With Me)"	–		Non-album singles
2020	"Like Beyoncé"	–		Non-album singles
2022	"Hasta la vista"	–		Non-album singles
