= FYF =

FYF or FyF may refer to:

- FYF Fest, music festival in Los Angeles, United States
- Föreningen Ytkemisk Forskning I(The Association for Surface Chemistry Research), part of the Institute for Surface Chemistry, Swedish company
- First Year Foundations, courses at Innis College, Toronto
- Free Your Feet, sock produced by Swiss Barefoot Company
- FyF Residence, project in Rosario, Argentina by Georgina Huljich
- Full-year forecast, a business and finance abbreviation
- FYF, 2025 single by American pop music group RM47
- FYF, division code for Fuyuan, Heilongjiang, China
- FyF Racing, team of Canadian racing driver Nico Christodoulou
