= Hell of a Night =

Hell of a Night or A Hell of a Night may refer to:

- A Hell of a Night, a live album by Dave Evans (singer)
- Hell of a Night, an EP by The Team
- "Hell of a Night" (Dustin Lynch song), 2014
- "Hell of a Night" (Schoolboy Q song), 2014
- "Hell of a Night", a song by Dorrough from the album Get Big (2010)
- "Hell of a Night", a song by Travis Scott from album Owl Pharaoh (2013)
- "A Hell of a Night", a song by Roy Gaines and the Crusaders, from album Gainelining (1981)

== See also ==
- "Helluva Nite", a song by Madcon from Contraband (2010)
