= One Life (Madcon song) =

Single by Madcon featuring Kelly Rowland

from the album Icon
- Released: May 13, 2013
- Genre: R&B, hip hop music
- Length: 3:32
- Label: Epic
- Songwriters: Kelly Rowland; TJ Oosterhuis; Yosef Wolde-Mariam; Tshawe Baqwa; Katerina Bramley
- Producer: TJ Oosterhuis

Madcon singles chronology
"In My Head" (2013)	"One Life" (2013)	"The Signal" (2013)

Kelly Rowland singles chronology
"Without Me" (2013)	"One Life" (2013)	"Dirty Laundry" (2013)

"One Life" is a song by the Norwegian urban duo Madcon featuring guest vocals by American recording artist Kelly Rowland. It was written by band members Yosef Wolde-Mariam and Tshawe Baqwa along with Rowland, Katerina Bramley, and TJ Oosterhuis, with production helmed by the latter. The second single to be lifted from Madcon's upcoming second studio album Icon (2013), it was released on May 13, 2013, throughout Europe.

== Music video ==
A music video for the song was filmed by Norwegian director Ray Kay.

== Track listings and formats ==
Digital EP

1. "One Life" (Radio Edit) – 3:31
2. "One Life" (Bodybangers Remix) – 5:23
3. "One Life" (Nino Fish Remix) – 5:44
4. "One Life" (Mitchell Niemeyer Remix) – 3:38
5. "One Life" (Bodybangers Remix Edit) – 3:42
6. "One Life" (Instrumental) – 3:28

CD maxi single

1. "One Life" (Radio Edit) – 3:31
2. "One Life" (Bodybangers Remix) – 5:23
3. "One Life" (Nino Fish Remix) – 5:45
4. "One Life" (Bodybangers Remix Edit) – 3:42
5. "One Life" (Instrumental) – 3:27

CD single

1. "One Life" (Radio Edit) – 3:31
2. "One Life" (Bodybangers Remix) – 5:23

== Charts ==
=== Weekly charts ===
Weekly chart performance for "One Life"
Chart (2013)	Peak position
Austria (Ö3 Austria Top 40)	9
Belgium (Ultratip Bubbling Under Flanders)	7
Belgium (Ultratip Bubbling Under Wallonia)	15
CIS Airplay (TopHit)	131
Czech Republic Airplay (ČNS IFPI)	83
Germany (GfK)	6
Germany (Deutsche Black Charts)	13
Hungary (Editors' Choice Top 40)	39
Norway (VG-lista)	11
Romania (Airplay 100)	59
Slovakia Airplay (ČNS IFPI)	37
Switzerland (Schweizer Hitparade)	37
Ukraine Airplay (TopHit)	66

=== Yearly charts ===
Year-end chart performance for "One Life"
Chart (2013)	Position
Austria (Ö3 Austria Top 40)	71
Germany (Media Control AG)	63
Ukraine Airplay (TopHit)	75

== Certifications ==
Certifications for "One Life"
Region	Certification	Certified units/sales
Germany (BVMI)	Gold	150,000^{^}
Streaming
Norway (IFPI Norway)	2× Platinum	6,000,000^{†}
^{^} Shipments figures based on certification alone.^{†} Streaming-only figures based on certification alone.
