= The Oslo Agreement =

Studio album by Paperboys
- Released: 2009
- Genre: Hip hop, Rap
- Label: Bonnier Music

Singles from The Oslo Agreement
- 1. "Lonesome Traveller"

Professional ratings
Review scores
Source	Rating
VG	5/6 stars
NRK	3/6 stars
Hamar Arbeiderblad	(4/6)

The Oslo Agreement is an album by Norwegian Hip-Hop group Paperboys. It was released in 2009. It features the hit "Lonesome Traveler", which topped the charts in Norway for three weeks.

== Track listing ==
1. The Way
2. Easy Street
3. See Me Coming
4. Into The Same
5. On A High
6. Lonesome Traveller
7. The Greatest Thing
8. I Be I
9. 12 Step
10. Morning Rain
11. After All
12. Out Of Control
