= The Sound of Missing You =

2009 single by Ameerah

Single by Ameerah
- Released: December 2009
- Genre: Eurodance, trance
- Length: 3:33
- Label: Spinnin' Records
- Songwriters: Didrik Thott, Sebastian Thott, Carl Björsell, Ameerah

Ameerah singles chronology
"The Sound of Missing You" (2009)	"Freaky Like Me" (2010)

"The Sound of Missing You"

Single by Wildboyz featuring Ameerah
- Released: 11 January 2010
- Genre: Eurodance, trance
- Length: 3:33
- Label: Universal Music (Belgium); Spinnin Records
- Songwriters: Didrik Thott, Sebastian Thott, Carl Björsell, Astrid Roelants

Ameerah singles chronology
"The Sound of Missing You" (2009)	"The Sound of Missing You" (2010)	"Freaky like Me" (2010)

Music video
- "The Sound of Missing You" by Wildboyz featuring Ameerah on YouTube

"The Sound of Missing You" is the debut single by Belgian-Tunisian singer Ameerah. It is considered to be her first international hit dance single. It was also her first song to be produced in the United States. The song reached number 3 on the Billboard Hot Dance Airplay chart.

The single was released in December 2009 in Belgium and the Netherlands as Wildboyz featuring Ameerah, charting in both countries. In October 2010, the song peaked at number-two on the Romanian Airplay Chart.

== Live performance ==
Ameerah performed "The Sound of Missing You" live on several tour dates throughout Europe and in certain music festivals, such as Bydgoszcz Hit Festival and the Hity na Czasie contest from Poland and the SLAM FM Beachbreak, in Bloemendaal.

== Chart performance ==
The song peaked at number-three on the US Billboard Hot Dance Airplay chart in early 2010, and stayed in the top 10 for more than 10 weeks. Later, in May, "The Sound of Missing You" entered the official Romanian Top 100. In mid-September, the song reached the Romanian top 10. A few weeks later, on October 17, it peaked at number-two on the Airplay Top 100, and remained at its peak position for three weeks. It was the 22nd most played song in Romania in 2010.

== Music video ==
The music video was shot in the United States in late 2009 and premiered on Spinnin' Records' official YouTube profile on December 3, 2009. It features Ameerah walking down the empty streets of a big city, in a desert and nearby a crashed plane. So far, it has gained over 20 million views on YouTube.

== Wildboyz version ==
For the European markets, the song was marketed as Wildboyz featuring Ameerah. The single was a hit in Belgium, the Netherlands and Romania.

=== Track listing ===
1. "The Sound of Missing You" (Radio Edit) (3:33)
2. "The Sound of Missing You" (Extended Mix) (5:42)
3. "The Sound of Missing You" (TJ's Candlelight Mix) (3:35)

== Charts ==
Ameerah version (solo)

Chart (2010)	Peak position
US Hot Dance Airplay	3

Wildboyz featuring Ameerah

Chart (2010)	Peak position
Belgium (Ultratop 50 Flanders)	22
Belgium (Ultratip Bubbling Under Wallonia)	11
Netherlands (Single Top 100)	44
Poland (Polish Airplay New)	2
Romania (Romanian Top 100)	2
