= Kjører på =

Single by Madcon featuring Timbuktu

from the album Contakt
- Released: 21 June 2012
- Recorded: 2012
- Genre: Pop
- Length: 3:36
- Label: Cosmos

Madcon singles chronology
"Sunrise" (2012)	"Kjører på" (2012)	"Fest på Smedstad vest" (2012)

Timbuktu singles chronology
"Fallskärm" (2012)	"Kjører på" (2012)

Music video
- "Kjører på" on YouTube

"Kjører på" is a 2012 single by Norwegian band Madcon featuring Swedish rapper and reggae artist Timbuktu. It is taken from the Madcon album Contakt that was released on 21 June 2012 to coincide with the release of the album.

== Music video ==
The music video directed by Frederic Esnault and Bold Productions film shows the Madcon duo Tshawe Baqwa and Yosef Wolde-Mariam singing and dancing with Timbuktu on top of small building structures with grand views of the city of Oslo in the background.

== Chart performance ==
Chart (2012)	Peak position
Norway (VG-lista)	14

== Release history ==
Country	Release date	Format(s)	Label
Norway	21 June 2012	Digital download	Cosmos
