= Outrun the Sun =

Single by Madcon featuring Maad*Moiselle

from the album Contraband
- Released: 19 November 2010
- Recorded: 2010
- Genre: Pop, R&B
- Length: 3:12
- Label: Cosmos Music Norway
- Songwriters: Jonas Jeberg, Terence Abney, Tshawe Baqwa, Yosef Wolde-Mariam, Marcella Brailsford, Kasper Larsen, Ole Brodersen
- Producer: Jonas Jeberg

Madcon singles chronology
"Freaky Like Me" (2010)	"Outrun the Sun" (2010)	"Helluva Nite" (2011)

"Outrun the Sun" is an English language song by the Norwegian urban duo Madcon featuring vocals from Maad*Moiselle. It is the third single released from their fourth album Contraband. The song was written by Jonas Jeberg, Terence Abney, Tshawe Baqwa, Yosef Wolde-Mariam, Marcella Brailsford, Kasper Larsen, Ole Brodersen. It was released on 19 November 2010. The video was directed by Mauri Chifflet and produced by sv:lillasyster produktion

== Track listing ==
Digital download No. 1
No.	Title	Length
1.	"Outrun the Sun" (featuring Maad*Moiselle)	3:12

Digital download No. 2
No.	Title	Length
1.	"Outrun the Sun" (Cosmic Dawn Radio Edit)	3:50
2.	"Outrun the Sun" (Cosmic Dawn Club Mix)	6:20

German CD single

1. "Outrun the Sun" (feat. Maad*Moiselle) – 3:12
2. "Outrun the Sun" (feat. Maad*Moiselle) (Cosmic Dawn Radio Edit) – 3:50

== Credits and personnel ==
- Lead vocals – Madcon and Maad Moiselle
- Lyrics – Terence Abney, Tshawe Baqwa, Yosef Wolde-Mariam, Marcella Brailsford, Kasper Larsen, Ole Brodersen
- Producer – Jonas Jeberg
- Label – Cosmos Music Norway

== Charts ==
Chart (2010–11)	Peak position
Austria (Ö3 Austria Top 40)	20
Germany (Media Control)	27
Norway (VG-lista)	11
Slovakia (Rádio Top 100)	29

== Release history ==
Country	Date	Format	Label
Norway	19 November 2010	Digital download	Cosmos Music Norway
Norway	14 March 2011	Digital download	Cosmos Music Norway
