= Lonesome Traveler (Paperboys song) =

"Lonesome Traveller"

Single by Paperboys

from the album The Oslo Agreement
- Released: August 31, 2009
- Genre: Hip hop, Rap
- Length: 3:55
- Label: Bonnier Music
- Songwriter(s): Øyvind Sauvik, DJ Pope Dawg, Anders Møller

Music video
- "Lonesome Traveller" on YouTube

Lonesome Traveller is a song by the Norwegian Hip-Hop group Paperboys. It was featured on the album The Oslo Agreement and is easy recognizable by its banjo-rap and choir in the chorus.

It spent twenty-four weeks in the Norwegian Singles Chart, five of which were at number one.

The lyrics differ from the original Lonesome Traveller (Lee Hays song): Yo every day of my life I've been traveling, Went here, went there, came back again, ...
