= So Dark the Con of Man =

Studio album by Madcon
- Released: 3 December 2007 (NOR); 18 August 2008 (UK)
- Recorded: 2007
- Genre: Hip hop
- Length: 52:58
- Label: RCA Records (UK)

Madcon chronology
It's All a Madcon (2004)	So Dark the Con of Man (2007)	An InCONvenient Truth (2008)

Singles from So Dark the Con of Man
- 1. "Beggin'" Released: 26 October 2007; 2. "Back on the Road" Released: 2008

So Dark the Con of Man is the second album by the Norwegian urban music duo Madcon, released in December 2007. Its title is an anagram used in The Da Vinci Code, a 2003 novel by Dan Brown.

== Track listing ==
No.	Title	Writer(s)	Length
1.	"Beggin'"	Bob Gaudio, Peggy Farina	3:36
2.	"Back on the Road" (feat. Paperboys)	Tshawe Baqwa, Yosef Wolde-Mariam, Vagabond	3:35
3.	"Liar"		3:08
4.	"Hard to Read" (feat. Noora)	Tshawe Baqwa, Yosef Wolde-Mariam, Noora, Eigil Gjerstad Berntsen, Hans Marius Skifjeld	3:02
5.	"Life's Too Short"		3:19
6.	"The Way We Do Thangs" (feat. Timbuktu)	Tshawe Baqwa, Yosef Wolde-Mariam, 3Elementz, Timbuktu	3:58
7.	"Blessed"	Tshawe Baqwa, Yosef Wolde-Mariam, Eigil Gjerstad Berntsen, Hans Marius Skifjeld	2:57
8.	"Süda Süda" (feat. El Axel)	Tshawe Baqwa, Yosef Wolde-Mariam, Eigil Gjerstad Berntsen, Hans Marius Skifjeld, El Axel	3:29
9.	"Let It Be Known"	Tshawe Baqwa, Yosef Wolde-Mariam, Eigil Gjerstad Berntsen, Hans Marius Skifjeld	3:36
10.	"Let's Dance Instead"	Tshawe Baqwa, Yosef Wolde-Mariam, Eigil Gjerstad Berntsen, Hans Marius Skifjeld	2:45
11.	"Dandelion"	Tshawe Baqwa, Yosef Wolde-Mariam, 3Elementz	3:57
12.	"Pride & Prejudice" (feat. Sofian)	Tshawe Baqwa, Yosef Wolde-Mariam, Eigil Gjerstad Berntsen, Hans Marius Skifjeld, Sofjan	3:03
13.	"Me & My Brother"		5:20

UK Bonus Tracks
No.	Title	Writer(s)	Length
14.	"Loose"		3:30
15.	"Doo Woop"	Tshawe Baqwa, Yosef Wolde-Mariam, 3Elementz	3:38

== Charts ==
=== Weekly charts ===
Chart (2007–2009)	Peak position
Belgian Albums (Ultratop Flanders)	30
French Albums (SNEP)	11
German Albums (Offizielle Top 100)	45
Norwegian Albums (VG-lista)	3
Swiss Albums (Schweizer Hitparade)	59
UK Albums (OCC)	137

=== Year-end charts ===
Chart (2008)	Position
French Albums (SNEP)	119

== Certifications ==
Region	Certification	Certified units/sales
France (SNEP)	Gold	75,000^{*}
^{*} Sales figures based on certification alone.

== Release history ==
Region	Release date	Format	Label
United Kingdom	18 August 2008	CD, digital download	RCA Records
