= Colors of Love (Kelly Chen album) =

Greatest hits album by Kelly Chen
- Released: December 8, 1999
- Genre: Cantopop
- Length: 59:03
- Producer: Mark Lui

Kelly Chen chronology
Don't Stop Loving Me (1999)	Colors of Love (1999)	Love You So Much (2000)

戀愛情色 (Colors of Love) is the third Cantonese Greatest Hits Album by Hong Kong singer Kelly Chen.It was released on December 8, 1999 through Go East Entertainment Company Ltd./ Decca Records in Hong Kong and Taiwan. which peaked at number 1 for 3 weeks, stayed on the IFPI Album Chart for 14 weeks, and sold over 150,000 copies in Hong Kong.

In 2000, Chen won IFPI's best-selling album award and the best-selling Hong Kong female artist.

The compilation includes Kelly's hits from some of her studio albums which was released in 1998-1999. It also featured 8 new songs: Three original songs, "Colors of Love (戀愛情色)", "False Innocence(假天真)" and "Love Is All Around (渾身是愛)"; two cover songs "The Root of Love (愛的根源)" and "Childhood (99 Version)(小時候(99年版)"; four remakes of her previous singles— "I Dare to Love (Autumn Version) (我敢去愛 (Autumn Version))" (1999), "I Can't Help But Love You (情不自禁 (Acoustic Version))" (1999), "It's All Your Fault (Duet Version) (都是你的錯 (合唱版))" (1999) and "I Care About You So Much (Piano Version) (對你太在乎 (Piano Version))" (1999).

== Track listing ==
CD
No.	Title	Music	Length
1.	"Colors of Love (戀愛情色)"	雷頌德
2.	"False Innocence(假天真)"	謝霆鋒
3.	"Love Is All Around (渾身是愛)"
4.	"I Dare to Love (Autumn Version) (我敢去愛 (Autumn Version))"	雷頌德
5.	"I Can't Help But Love You (情不自禁 (Acoustic Version))"
6.	"It's All Your Fault (都是你的錯)"
7.	"The Root of Love (愛的根源)"
8.	"I Care About You So Much (Piano Version) (對你太在乎 (Piano Version))"
9.	"Serious (嚴重)"
10.	"True Feeling (2 Kelly Mix) (真感覺 (兩個 Kelly Mix))"	雷頌德
11.	"只有自己和藥知"	雷頌德
12.	"Thin Love Letter (薄情書)"	雷頌德
13.	"Love of a Lifetime (一生一愛情)"
14.	"It's Better To Forget You (還是趁早把你忘記 )"	雷頌德
15.	"Childhood (99 Version) (小時候(99年版))" (熊熊兒童合唱團)
16.	"Detest Missing You (憎恨想念你)"
17.	"Da De Dum (I Am Falling Out of Love) (Da De Dum (我失戀))"	雷頌德

Hong Kong Fourth Edition: Bonus Cd single Track listing
No.	Title	Lyrics	Music	Length
1.	"Love Strategy:Rave Medley (戀愛攻略Rave Medley)"	林夕	雷頌德
2.	"Love Strategy:Rave Medley（Dance Beat Version）(戀愛攻略Rave Medley（Dance Beat Version）)"	林夕	雷頌德

== Release history ==
Region	Date	Format	Catalogue no.	Label	Ref.
Hong Kong	December 8, 1999	CD	H99037-2	Go East Entertainment	
Taiwan	December 8, 1999	CD	71070	Decca Records	
Hong Kong	Jan 5, 2000	CD	H99037-2	Go East Entertainment	
Hong Kong	Feb 20, 2000	CD	H99037-2	Go East Entertainment	
Hong Kong	Mar 5, 2000	CD		Go East Entertainment	
