= Liar (Madcon song) =

Single by Madcon

from the album An InCONvenient Truth
- Released: 2008 (NOR); 20 February 2009 (UK)
- Recorded: 2008
- Genre: Soul, hip hop
- Length: 3:08
- Label: RCA Records
- Songwriter(s): Kim Ofstad, Jonny Sjo, Hitesh Ceon, Yosef Woldemariam, Tshawe Shoore Baqwa

Madcon singles chronology
"Back on the Road" (2008)	"Liar" (2008)	"Glow" (2010)

"Liar" is an English-language song by the Norwegian urban duo Madcon, from their third studio album, An InCONvenient Truth. The song was written by Kim Ofstad, Jonny Sjo, Hitesh Ceon, Yosef Woldemariam and Tshawe Shoore Baqwa and was released in 2008 in Norway, and on 20 February 2009 in the UK. The song reached number 2 in Norway and number 65 in Germany.

== Track listing ==
iTunes single
No.	Title	Length
1.	"Liar"	3:08
2.	"Wolves"	3:09

iTunes (Remix) – EP
No.	Title	Length
1.	"Liar" (My Digital Enemy Full Vox)	7:20
2.	"Liar" (The New Devices Radio Edit)	3:22
3.	"Liar" (The New Devices Extended Club Mix)	6:51
4.	"Liar" (UK Liar Wookie Remix)	5:03
5.	"Liar" (UK Monk & Prof Remix)	3:50
6.	"Liar" (Radio Edit)	3:09

== Credits and personnel ==
- Lead vocals – Madcon
- Music – Kim Ofstad, Jonny Sjo, Hitesh Ceon, Yosef Woldemariam, Tshawe Shoore Baqwa
- Lyrics – Kim Ofstad, Jonny Sjo, Hitesh Ceon, Yosef Woldemariam, Tshawe Shoore Baqwa
- Label: RCA Records

== Chart performance ==
Chart (2008/2009)	Peak position
Germany (GfK)	65
Hungary (Editors' Choice Top 40)	37
Norway (VG-lista)	2
