= Noora Noor =

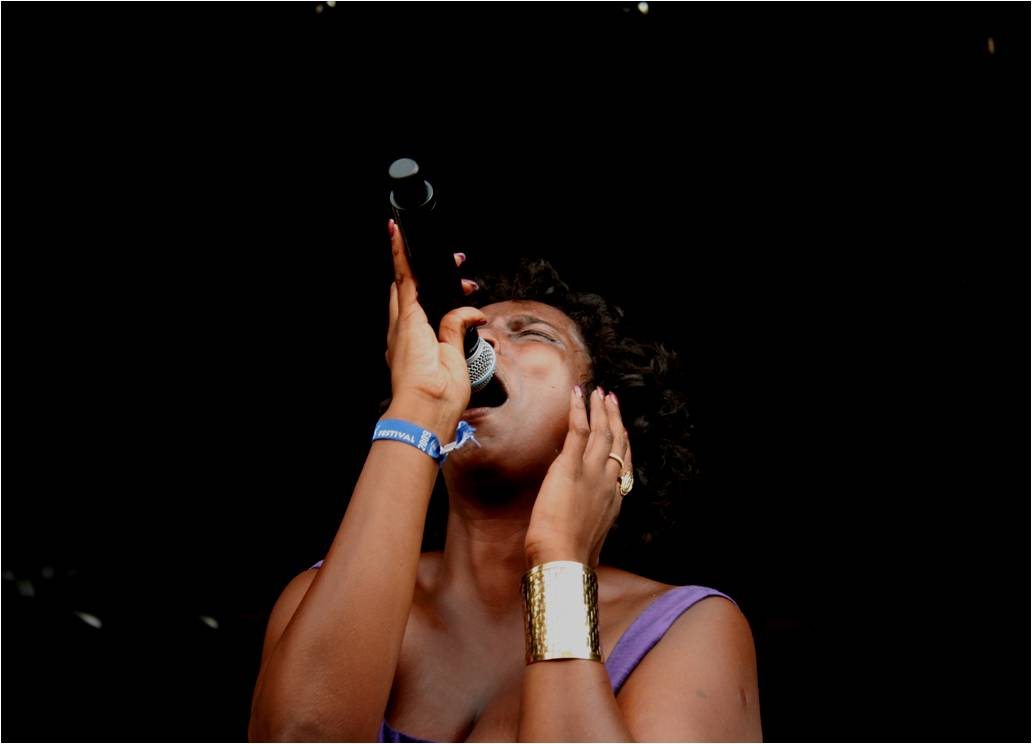

Background information
- Also known as: Noora
- Born: Noora Mohammed Noor; 8 July 1979 (age 47); Dubai, United Arab Emirates
- Genres: Neo soul, jazz, blues
- Occupation: Singer
- Instrument: Vocal
- Years active: 1998–present
- Labels: Warner Music Group (1998–2004); Grappa/Blue Mood Records (2004 - present)

Noora Noor aka Noora (born 8 July 1979) is a Somali-Norwegian neo soul singer.

== Career ==
Noor performed locally from the age of eight and got a recording contract with Warner Music at 15. She then began working with Stargate (production team) to make her first album. The success of the album launched Stargate's international career as R&B/Soul producers.

Noor's debut album, Curious, was released in 1999 and became one of the first notable Scandinavian R&B albums. The single "Need You" was also played constantly on "The Lick" on MTV. Curious became a success also in Japan with more than 40,000 sales. It took five years until the release of her second album, All I Am, in 2004, as Noor was diagnosed with tuberculosis. The album included more self-penned songs, written in collaboration with US and UK songwriters. She is also featured on Madcon's 2007 album So Dark the Con of Man and some Tommy Tee releases. In addition, Noor played Maria Magdalen in a big outdoor version of Jesus Christ Superstar.

Her most recent album, Soul Deep, was released in Norway in March 2009 to rave reviews and was rated 6 "dice" in Norway's newspaper Verdens Gang. Recorded in San Jose, California, with local blues and soul musicians, it also features members of Little Charlie & The Nightcats. The producer was Kid Andersen, the Norwegian band's guitar virtuoso. The album was released outside Norway during 2010, with the first single, in Benelux, made available in April/May 2010.

In March 2011, Noor participated in the Norwegian national selection for the Eurovision Song Contest 2011, the Melodi Grand Prix, with the song "Gone with the wind".

== Discography ==
=== Albums ===
- 1999: Curious
- 2004: All I Am
- 2009: Soul Deep

=== Singles ===
- "Official"
- "Need You"
- "Zeros"
- "Feelin' It" (with Tommy Tee and Jo Jo Pellegrino)
- "Forget What I Said"
- "Funky Way"
- "What Man Have Done"
- "Gone with the Wind"

=== Appearances ===
- "Hard to Read" (So Dark the Con of Man) - Madcon
- "The Royal PortKids" (CD single)
- "Old Angel Midnight" - Paal Flaata (2008)
- "Elias og Kongeskipet" (movie and CD single)
- "The Princess and the Frog" (Disney 2010 - Norwegian version)

== Awards ==
- Hitawards (1999): Female Artist of the Year
- Natt og Dag prisen (1999): Best Live Artist
- Spellemannprisen (Norwegian Grammy Award) (2009): Female Artist of the Year

Awards
Preceded by Maria Mena	Recipient of the best Female Pop Solo Artist Spellemannprisen; 2009	Succeeded by Ingrid Olava
