= Love Island Norway =

Norwegian dating reality series

- Genre: Reality
- Created by: ITV Studios
- Based on: Love Island
- Presented by: Tone Damli (season 1); Morten Hegseth (season 2); Alexandra Joner (season 3–4); Sophie Elise Isachsen (season 5–)
- Narrated by: Rasmus Wold (season 1); Egil Skurdal (season 2–4)
- Country of origin: Norway
- Original language: Norwegian
- No. of seasons: 5 (2027)
- No. of episodes: 146

Production
- Producer: ITV Studios for TV 2
- Production locations: Gran Canaria, Spain (2018, 2024–2025); Buenos Aires, Argentina (2020); Marbella, Spain (2027–)
- Running time: 43 minutes

Original release
- Network: TV3 (2018); TV 2 (2020, 2024–2025); VGTV (2027–)
- Release: 26 August 2018

Related
- Love Island franchise

Love Island Norway (Norwegian: Love Island Norge) is the Norwegian version of Love Island. The series premiered on 26 August 2018, and was broadcast on TV3. It was later picked up by TV 2. Season 1 and 3 were shot on Gran Canaria, and season 2 in Buenos Aires. Season 4 also took place on Gran Canaria.

== Series overview ==
Season	Islanders	Weeks	Days	Episodes	Host	Originally Aired		Winners	Runners-up
Season	Islanders	Weeks	Days	Episodes	Host	Season premiere	Season finale	Winners	Runners-up
1	23	6	42	36	Tone Damli	26 August 2018	4 October 2018	Andrea Sveinsdottir & Morten Dalhaug	Cristian Borge Olsen & Ellinor Selsø Håkonsen
2	27	8	56	40	Morten Hegseth	5 January 2020	27 February 2020	Johannes Klemp & Nora Haukland	Iselin Nordøy & Omid Rosander
3	31	7	49	35	Alexandra Joner	4 March 2024	19 April 2024	Elisabeth Henriksen Reither & Henrik Fossedal	Magnus Gruer & Hanna Lindblom; Christine Berg & Andreas Glimsdal Johansen
4	31	5	34	35	Alexandra Joner	10 March 2025	25 April 2025	Camilla De Souza Devik & Nicklas Sundsvåg	Mats Eikedalen & Thale Røhne; Jenny Rognstad Amaoko & Patrick Gill Loua
5	TBA	5	TBA	TBA	Sophie Elise Isachsen	2027	2027		

== Season 1 (2018) ==
The first Norwegian season of the series was broadcast by TV3, took place on Gran Canaria and premiered on 26 August 2018. The host was Tone Damli and the narrater was Rasmus Wold.

The final was shown on 4 October 2018, and the winners were Andrea Sveinsdottir and Morten Dalhaug. They chose to share the cash prize of 500,000 NOK.

Out of all the couples from this season, only Sveinsdottir and Dalhaug are still together. They got married in June 2026, after being together eight years and engaged for five years.

=== Islanders Love Island Norway Season 1 2018 ===
Name	Age	From	Episodes	
Andrea Sveinsdottir	23	Larvik/Oslo	Ep 1–36	Winner
Morten Olsen Dalhaug	25	Kristiansand	Ep 1–36	Winner
Cristian Borge Olsen	26	Bergen	Ep 1–36	Runner up
Ellinor Selsø Håkonsen	24	Haugesund	Ep 1–36	Runner up
Bruna Camargo	23	Florø	Ep 1–36	3rd place
Nicklas André Nikolaisen	23	Bergen	Ep 3–36	3rd place
Andreas Kronheim	27	Bergen	Ep 1–34	
Silje Bjørnstad Andersen	23	Lørenskog	Ep 4–34	
Martin André Reinertsen	25	Oslo	Ep 6–32	
Anne Marthe Furuseth Unander	25	Oslo	Ep 21–32	
Magnhild Sundland	29	Trondheim	Ep 1–8, 12–31	
Einar Kjevik Øien	23	Oppeid/Tromsø	Ep 23–31	
Rebekka Johansen	27	Sandnessjøen	Ep 26–29	
Viktoria Olsen Brakstad	26	Bergen	Ep 1–26	
Pål-Espen Andersen	27	Notodden	Ep 19–26	
Marius Mellem	25	Tromsø	Ep 14–22	
Maren Stornes	30	Fredrikstad/Oslo	Ep 18–22	
Henrik Raastad	28	Oslo	Ep 19–21	
Ina Caroline Solum Larsen	27	Steinkjer	Ep 16–18	
Isabelle Eriksen	21	Oslo	Ep 16–18	
Arwin Rahi	32	Stockholm/Oslo	Ep 1–12	
Marius Gjøstein	32	Værlandet	Ep 1–8	
Else Sofie Berg	32	Oslo	Ep 1–5	

== Season 2 (2020) ==
The second Norwegian season of the series was broadcast by TV 2, took place in Buenos Aires, Argentina and premiered on 5 January 2020. The host was Morten Hegseth and the narrator was Egil Skurdal. This was the first season to introduce Casa Amor.

The final was shown on 27 February 2020, and the winners were Nora Haukland and Johannes Klemp. They chose to share the cash prize of 300,000 NOK.

None of the couples from this season are still together, but the winners Klemp and Haukland were together for 1,5 years after being becoming engaged in April 2021 and splitting up in August 2021.

=== Islanders Love Island Norway Season 2 2020 ===
Name	Age	From	Episodes	
Johannes Klemp	27	Oslo	Ep 1–40	Winner
Nora Haukland	22	Alta/Oslo	Ep 1–40	Winner
Iselin Nordøy	23	Ski/Oslo	Ep 1–40	Runner up
Omid Rosander	24	Kristiansand	Ep 4–40	Runner up
Ali Esmael	28	Risør/Oslo	Ep 1–40	3rd place
Mie Mack Cappelen	22	Bærum/Oslo	Ep 1–40	3rd place
Nathan "Nate" Kahungu	23	Sarpsborg/Oslo	Ep 1–37	
Thammy Dias	29	Larvik/Oslo	Ep 1–37	
Victor Barstad	23	Lillestrøm	Ep 18–36	
Sofie Antonsen	20	Farsund	Ep 27–36	
Elisabeth Lund	19	Kristiansand	Ep 30–36	
Sanpreet Singh	27	Drøbak/Oslo	Ep 32–36	
Christina Aranja Ophaug-Johansen	25	Trondheim/Oslo	Ep 18–34	
Jon André Melhus	22	Bø i Telemark	Ep 15–31	
Alexandra Mjør	21	Asker/Oslo	Ep 18–31	
Marius Helstad	26	Langhus/Lund	Ep 24–31	
Antony Magallanes Fagermos	22	Drammen/Oslo	Ep 24–27	
Ida Myren	21	Fræna	Ep 1–25	
Thomas Brien	23	Fredrikstad/Bergen	Ep 18–25	
Andrea Gladsø	25	Trondheim	Ep 18–22	
Ådne Funderud	23	Mysen/Oslo	Ep 1–18	
Caroline Berg-Thomassen	21	Stavanger	Ep 10–18	
Oda Lindsetmo	22	Trondheim	Ep 1–17	
Andreas Eikanger	26	Vestby	Ep 11–17	
Tanja Løvik	29	Trondheim	Ep 8–14	
Eskild Magnussen	27	Oslo	Ep 1–9	
Emilio Evertsen da Gama	22	Stavanger	Ep 1–6	

== Season 3 (2024) ==
The third Norwegian season of the series was to be broadcast by TV 2 on Gran Canaria and set to premiere in 2021 with Morten Hegseth as host. However, the filming of the third season was postponed indefinitely due to the ongoing COVID-19 pandemic. In December 2021 it was announced that the season would not be filmed after all, and the Norwegian version of the series appeared to have been canceled for good.

However, in August 2023, TV 2 during its autumn launch revealed that the third season would become a reality after all. And that filming would take place in the new year, in 2024 in Maspalomas on Gran Canaria with Morten Hegseth as host this time as well. This season, however, viewers would not vote for their favorites, and the series would not be broadcast in real time, the day after filming as in the two previous seasons. This time, selected "superfans" were given the opportunity to vote and access the episodes several weeks before they were broadcast on TV2 Play to the public.

On 24 January 2024, Hegseth announced that he was stepping down as host. He was replaced by Alexandra Joner.

Filming for the third season began on 6 February 2024, and the first episode aired on 4 March 2024. This season lasted for seven weeks, with filming from Tuesday to Saturday. Sundays and Mondays were days off for the islanders and Joner commuted back to Norway.

Narrator this season was Egil Skurdal, as in the previous season.

Although the "superfans" voted throughout the season, it was the public who decided who should win. Since the filming was four weeks ahead of the TV schedule and the filming had ended a long time ago when the finale was broadcast, they decided to shoot three different ending scenarios. Joner revealed this on his morning radio show on P5. This was later confirmed by TV 2.

The final was shown on 19 April 2024, and the winners were Elisabeth Henriksen Reither and Henrik Fossedal. They shared the cash prize of 300,000 NOK.

Out of all the couples, only Berg and Johansen are still together (as of October 2026). They got engaged in July 2026.

The winning couple Reither and Fossedal were together for 1,5 years before splitting up in September 2025.

=== Islanders Love Island Norway Season 3 2024 ===
Name	Age	From	Episodes	
Elisabeth Henriksen Reither	28	Kløfta/Oslo	Ep 1–35	Winner
Henrik Fossedal	29	Bergen/Volda	Ep 1–35	Winner
Magnus Pettersen Gruer	22	Hønefoss	Ep 9–35	Final
Hanna Rose-Marie Lindblom	21	Trondheim	Ep 17–35	Final
Christine Berg	24	Oslo	Ep 14–35	Final
Andreas Glimsdal Johansen	28	Gjøvik/Oslo	Ep 21–35	Final
Lenny Langhelle	21	Bergen	Ep 1–34	
Madelen Christine Magnussen	26	Eidsvoll/Bergen	Ep 1–34	
Christina Sandnes	25	Lofoten/Barcelona	Ep 1–32	
Marius Santos Osmundsen	25	Klepp	Ep 18–32	
Mikael Lorne	23	Seljord/Oslo	Ep 27–29	
Cornelius Hermansen	30	Gratangen/Oslo	Ep 16–28	
Lars Christian Therkelsen	23	Kragerø/Oslo	Ep 16–28	
Nora Emilie Nakken	25	Trondheim	Ep 17–28	
Mathea-Fabienne Englund	20	Sarpsborg/Oslo	Ep 24–28	
Simen Undlien Bruvoll	24	Melhus	Ep 16–20	
Kristoffer Spone	25	Oslo	Ep 16–20	
Oda Rikheim	24	Ski	Ep 17–20	
Janne-Lill Fernandez Skotheim	26	Molde	Ep 17–20	
Mathias Bremer Gulbrandsen	26	Oslo	Ep 1–16	
Sabrina Bella Abrahamsen	24	Telemark/Oslo	Ep 1–16	
Rayan Kralkallah	21	Sola	Ep 2–16	
Mona Morsi	25	Sandefjord	Ep 11–16	
Alba Bjerkan	23	Tromsø	Ep 11–16	
Edvard Dalsegg Strand	30	Oslo/Ormøya	Ep 1–14	
May Iren Frafjord	22	Stavanger	Ep 6–14	
Stine Ariana Johansen	26	Oslo/Marbella	Ep 1–11	
Maya Elvenes	25	Bergen	Ep 3–11	
John Brede Svendsen	27	Hammerfest/Oslo	Ep 1–3, 4–11	
Fredrik Hansen Heggeland	27	Os	Ep 7–11	
Julian Holmvik Rønning	25	Trondheim	Ep 4–9	

== Season 4 (2025) ==
The fourth Norwegian season of the series was broadcast by TV 2 and took place on Gran Canaria, Spain. The host was Alexandra Joner.

Filming began on 14 January 2025, and the finale was recorded on 17 February 2025. Thus, this season only lasted a record-low five weeks, but is presented as seven weeks because the islanders in this season was filming seven days a week without two days off as in the previous two seasons.

The first episode aired on 10 March 2025. Meaning this season there would be "superfans" who decided the fates of the islanders yet again. Like the previous season, it was the viewers who decided the winners, as three versions of the finale were recorded.

The narrator this season was, as in the previous two seasons, comedian Egil Skurdal.

The finale aired on 25 April 2025, and the winners were Camilla Ellinor De Souza Devik and Nicklas Olai Karlsen Sundsvåg. They shared the cash prize of 300,000 NOK. The winners this season became historic, as Sundsvåg entered the island as a bombshell during Casa Amor. No previous winners have been bombshells or entered via Casa Amor.

Out of all the couples, only Eikedalen and Røhne are still together (as of October 2026).

The winning couple Devik and Sundsvåg were together for 1 year and eight months, before splitting up in October 2026.

=== Islanders Love Island Norway Season 4 2025 ===
Name	Age	From	Episodes	
Camilla Ellinor De Souza Devik	28	Trondheim/Oslo	Ep 1–35	Winner
Nicklas Olai Karlsen Sundsvåg	22	Gruben	Ep 14–35	Winner
Mats Eikedalen	24	Stavern	Ep 2–35	Final
Thale Røhne	25	Hønefoss/Oslo	Ep 6–35	Final
Jenny Vibecke Rognstad Amaoko	23	Oslo	Ep 14–35	Final
Patrick Gill Loua	27	Bergen/Oslo	Ep 20–35	Final
Lirie Ferizi Osmani	27	Hønefoss/Oslo	Ep 1–13, 14–34	
Mathias Sabaghi Andersen	22	Bergen	Ep 14–34	
Amanda Elvira Engh	25	Kongsvinger/Oslo	Ep 25–33	
Martin Engebø	27	Førde/Bergen	Ep 26–33	
Malin Hjelmhaug	23	Bryne/Sogndal/Oslo	Ep 1–32	
Martin Garnås Sire	28	Gol/Oslo	Ep 1–32	
Casper Reynols Venstad	28	Skjetten/Oslo	Ep 1–31	
Nicole Shams Skjønnhaug	27	Drammen/Oslo	Ep 25–31	
Vetle Dale Svendsen	28	Rjukan/Oslo	Ep 2–29	
Aleksander Fridén	29	Kristiansand/Oslo	Ep 26–29	
Benedicte Buzake	21	Stavanger	Ep 12–25	
Andrea Nyeng	24	Buvika/Oslo	Ep 14–25	
Patrick Kwizera Bifuko	28	Oslo	Ep 14–25	
William Frøyland	23	Skjeberg/Oslo	Ep 14–25	
Jasper Amanuel Amdahl	31	Oslo	Ep 14–18	
Amalie Sørhaug	23	Haugesund/Oslo	Ep 14–17	
Siemone Bøe Olsen	22	Skien	Ep 14–17	
Jonathan Hailu	33	Bergen/Oslo	Ep 1–12	
Sunniva Elise Berg Hansen	26	Tønsberg	Ep 1–12	
Lea Irene Larssen	27	Trondheim/Stavanger	Ep 2–12	
Nicolai Eid Trondal	28	Arendal/Kristiansand	Ep 7–12	
Johan Lillebudal Sandnes	25	Røros/Trondheim	Ep 1–11	
Nini Diem Nguyen	24	Drammen/Oslo	Ep 1–11	
Magnus Pedersen	27	Oslo	Ep 1–6	
Maia Prestegård Dale	26	Førde	Ep 2–6	

== Season 5 (2027) ==
In April 2026, it was announced that VGTV had acquired the rights to Love Island, and that filming of season 5 would begin in the fall of 2026, with a planned release in 2027.

The fifth Norwegian season of the series is being broadcast by VGTV and takes place in Marbella, Spain. New host is Sophie Elise Isachsen.

Filming began on 18 August 2026 and lasted almost five weeks.
