= MAAD =

American singer-songwriter

- Born: Natasha Ferguson; 26 November; New York City, United States
- Genres: R&B; pop; dance
- Occupations: Singer; songwriter; DJ; model
- Years active: 2010–present
- Labels: GRDN
- Member of: RM47
- Website: www.rm47rm47rm47.com

Natasha Ferguson, known professionally as MAAD, is an American singer-songwriter, model and DJ and member of the duo RM47. She made her debut in the music industry with the Norwegian musical duo Madcon in 2010 and released her debut album Indigo in 2014. Blending elements of R&B, disco, funk and soul, Ferguson has built a versatile career spanning music, fashion and DJing. She has collaborated with artists and producers including A$AP Ferg, Lostboy, GRADES, MNEK, Aluna, Midas Hutch, and Theo Croker, and has performed at major events such as WorldPride, SXSW, Cannes Lions, and Coachella.

== Early life ==
Natasha Ferguson was born in New York City into an artistic family. Her mother is a fashion stylist, while her father is a musician. She grew up in Washington Heights, Manhattan, before moving with her family to Montclair, New Jersey. Ferguson began her artistic journey as a dancer and developed an interest in music and entertainment from a very young age. She is also the cousin of rapper A$AP Ferg. The turning point after graduating from high school, when she met producer Kwamé, who encouraged her to pursue a career as a singer and invited her to record her first demos. Around the same time, she also began working as a model, modeled for brands such as Anastasia Beverly Hills and Herbal Essences, and has been featured in publications like NYLON. Thanks to her collaboration with Kwamé, Ferguson began frequenting various recording studios in New York City, where she worked with other producers such as Just Blaze and The Stereotypes. During this time she started building her career as a songwriter and background vocalist, providing vocals for other artists, including a song on one of Drake's early mixtapes.

== Career ==
=== 2010–2015: Early collaborations and Indigo ===
Ferguson's professional music career began after meeting songwriting duo Lady and a Tramp and producer Jonas Jeberg, who introduced her to the Norwegian duo Madcon. Adopting the stage name MAAD*MOISELLE, she was featured on Madcon's singles Outrun the Sun, which reached number 11 on the official Norwegian Singles Chart, number 20 in the official Austria singles chart, and entered the Top 40 in the official Germany single chart. She also appeared on their follow-up single Helluva Nite alongside Ludacris, which reached number 10 on Norwegian official single chart. This collaboration led her to relocate to Europe, living between Norway and Germany, and touring with Madcon between 2010 and 2011.

In 2012 Ferguson returned to New York and settled in Brooklyn, where she began developing her solo project as an artist. She started experimenting with pop and dance sounds, releasing her first mixtapes and buzz singles online. That same year, she collaborated with DJ Fource and the German label Kontor Records on the track Coming Down. On November 19 of the same year, she served as the opening act Musiq Soulchild for his show at SOB's in NY.

In 2013 she appeared on A$AP Ferg’s debut album Trap Lord, contributing vocals to the track Make a Scene. In the same year she appeared as the female lead in the music video for Oh God by Luke James featuring Hit-Boy. Later that year, together with her friends and collaborators known as TheVamp, she began working on her debut album. The project marked a stylistic shift toward alternative R&B.

In 2014 Ferguson released her debut album Indigo independently. The album consisted of nine tracks, including Killa featuring A$AP Ferg, as well as the singles Take Me which she co-wrote with Ro James, No Love, and Everything You Got.

=== 2016–2020 : Rebranding, DJ career and Eventually, Pt. 1 ===
At the end of 2015 Ferguson rebranded her musical project, changing her stage name from MAAD*MOISELLE to MAAD. She released the single Sweet & Low in August 2015, marking a new artistic direction, and simultaneously began her career as a DJ.

In 2016 she started traveling frequently between New York, London and Los Angeles, collaborating with various producers and songwriters. On July 14, 2016, MAAD released the single Black Ice, co-written with Trey Campbell, followed by 90s Love on September 25.

Her second EP, Lé Funk, was released on March 31, 2017., On this project, MAAD explored funk, disco and R&B sounds, and it included the single Touch Me featuring Ro James. Later that year, she temporarily moved to London to work on new music. She released the singles Wonderland, produced by Lostboy and featuring Jimi Tents which premiered on Billboard. During this period, she also released New Religion (June 26, 2018), created in collaboration with GRADES, Kate Stewart and Chiara Hunter. These sessions led to the release of the Technicolor EP, which also featured the single Me & U.

In 2018 MAAD relocated to Los Angeles, continuing her simultaneous careers as a singer, model and DJ. She performed as a DJ for artists including Janelle Monáe and Kelis. That same year, she collaborated with producer Midas Hutch on his single I'll Go There.

In 2019 she performed alongside MNEK at WorldPride 2019 in Times Square in New York City, and then as DJ at 2019 Cannes Lions, and at 2019 CES and as artist at 2019 SXSW, she also released two singles: BAAD which video premiered on Billboard and Moolah (LuvIt).

On July 24, 2020, MAAD released her third EP, Eventually, Pt. 1, which showcased a more mature and refined sound blending alternative R&B and soul. The project included the singles Eventually and Get By, and marked a significant step in her artistic evolution.

=== 2021–present: RM47 ===
In 2021 Ferguson expanded her DJ career, performing at high-profile events, including Madonna’s Truth or Dare 30th anniversary celebration. Later that year, she decided to put her solo project MAAD on hold and, together with her long-time collaborator Raleigh, formed the alternative R&B duo RM47. The duo debuted on June 30, 2021, with the single Needed U, later followed by a remix version featuring rapper Nez.

In 2022 RM47 released the singles Strangers and BEETGOZON featuring Prince African Child. Their debut album, Stuck with You But I Like It, was released on June 27, 2023, preceded by the single Running Back.

Starting in 2024 the duo released a series of singles that appeared on multiple Spotify editorial playlists, further expanding their audience, while Ferguson also returned to her solo work under the name MAAD with the single Spaceman, recorded in Amsterdam. In 2025, RM47 performed at the Coachella DoLaB and released their second album, CYBER. That same year, Ferguson collaborated with jazz trumpeter Theo Croker on the track Up Frequency (Higher) from his album Dream Manifest. The pair also performed the song together on The Kelly Clarkson Show. The same year she also collaborated with Aluna's record label Noir Fever Records, in partnership with EMPIRE, releasing the singles of RM47 Grab A Plate featuring Aluna and Farrah Fawx and Veins.

== Discography ==
=== Album ===
==== with RM47 ====
- 2023 – Stuck with You But I Like it
- 2025 – Cyber

==== As MAAD*MOISELLE ====
- 2014 – Indigo

=== EP ===
- 2017 – Lé Funk
- 2018 – Technicolor
- 2020 – Eventually, Pt. 1

=== Singles ===
==== with RM47 ====
- 2021 – Needed U
- 2022 – Strangers
- 2022 – BEETGOZON (feat. Prince African Child)
- 2023 – Running Back
- 2023 – Hotline
- 2024 – Gimme Dat
- 2024 – Buss It
- 2024 – Le Fix
- 2025 – FYF
- 2025 – Grab a Plate (feat. Aluna, Farrah Fawx)
- 2025 – Veins
- 2025 – Underwater

==== As MAAD or MAAD*MOISELLE ====
- 2012 – Glitter
- 2013 – Take Me
- 2014 – Killa (feat. A$ap Ferg)
- 2014 – No Love
- 2014 – Everything You Got
- 2015 – Sweet & Low
- 2016 – Black Ice
- 2017 – Touch Me (feat. Ro James)
- 2017 – Wonderland (feat. Jim Tents)
- 2018 – New Religion
- 2018 – Me & U
- 2019 – BAAD
- 2019 – Moolah (LuvIt)
- 2020 – Eventually
- 2020 – Get By
- 2024 – Spaceman

==== As featured artist ====
- 2010 – Outrun the sun (Madcon feat. MAAD)
- 2010 – Helleva Nite (Madcon feat. MAAD & Ludacris)
- 2013 – Make A Scene (A$ap Ferg feat. MAAD)
- 2018 – I'll Go There (Midas Hutch feat. MAAD)
- 2019 – I'm On Fire (Tazer feat. MAAD & Keys the Prince)
- 2019 – All or Nothing (Chloe Martini feat. MAAD)
- 2020 – Rock Wit It (TT The Artist feat. MAAD)
- 2021 – Telephone (K, Le Maestro feat. MAAD)
- 2021 – Hey Stranger (Midas Hutch feat. MAAD & Jengi)
- 2021 – Right Way (Midas Hutch feat. MAAD)
- 2024 – Yea Yea Yea (TT The Artist feat. MAAD)
- 2025 – Up frequency (Higher) (Theo Croker feat. MAAD)
