= Daco Junior =

- Born: Sebastian Da Costa; 1990 (age 35–36); Luanda, Angola
- Origin: Vaasa, Finland
- Genres: Hip hop, pop, electronica
- Occupations: Musician, rapper, singer, record producer
- Instrument: Vocals
- Years active: 2010–present
- Labels: Universal Music (FIN), Unidream Music
- Website: www.dacojunior.com

Sebastian Da Costa (born 1990 in Luanda, Angola), better known by his stage name Daco Junior, is a singer/songwriter, rapper and a record producer from Vaasa, Finland. Daco Junior debuted in December 2010 with the single "Sane", which is an official remake of The Ark's hit single "It Takes a Fool to Remain Sane". The single was released through Daco Juniors own label Unidream Music and received widespread attention especially amongst Swedish-speaking media outlets in Finland.

== Gravity ==
In July 2011, a little over half a year later Daco Junior released a follow-up single "Gravity" through his own label Unidream Music as well. The single was chosen to a weekly "Hot or Not" radio program on YleX, where the listeners decide the hottest track of the week. Winning the weekly competition Daco Junior's "Gravity" earned its way to the playlist on Finlands national radio. Spent 15 weeks on top positions of the playlist in total and charted as number No. 1, two times consecutively. The single was eventually awarded as the most requested song of the year 2011, by Finlands national radio YleX.

== Heartbeat Solo ==
In the very beginning of 2012 Daco Junior signed a record deal with Universal Music Finland. Released three more singles "Like An Astronaut", "Perfect Runaway" featuring Kristiina Wheeler and "How Far" featuring Madcon. Daco Junior released his first major label album "Heartbeat Solo" in February 2013.

== Discography ==
=== Singles ===
- Sane (2010)
- Gravity (2011)
- Like An Astronaut (2012)
- Perfect Runaway (2012) feat. Kristiina Wheeler
- How Far (2012) feat. Madcon

=== Albums ===
- Heartbeat Solo (2013)
