= Back on the Road (Madcon song) =

Single by Madcon Featuring Paperboys

from the album So Dark the Con of Man
- Released: 28 July 2008
- Recorded: 2008
- Genre: R&B, hip hop
- Length: 3:09
- Songwriters: 3Elementz, Madcon, Vagabond
- Producer: "3Elementz"

Madcon singles chronology
"Beggin'" (2008)	"Back on the Road" (2008)	"Liar" (2008)

"Back on the Road" is an English-language song by the Norwegian urban duo Madcon released from their second album, So Dark the Con of Man, featuring vocals from Paperboys. The song was written by "3Elementz", Madcon, Vagabond and produced by 3Elementz. It was released in 2008. The song reached no. 6 in Norway and no. 66 in Germany.

== Track listing ==
CD single
No.	Title	Length
1.	"Back on the Road"	3:35
2.	"Doo-Wop"	3:48

== Credits and personnel ==
- Lead vocals – Madcon
- Music – 3Elementz, Madcon, Vagabond
- Lyrics – 3Elementz, Madcon, Vagabond
- Producer – 3Elementz

== Chart performance ==
Chart (2010)	Peak position
Germany (Media Control)	66
Norway (VG-lista)	6

=== Year-end charts ===
Chart (2009)	Position
Hungarian Singles Chart	95
