= Glow (Madcon song) =

Single by Madcon

from the album Contraband
- Released: 30 May 2010
- Recorded: 2010
- Genre: Electropop, Europop
- Length: 3:50
- Songwriters: Hitesh Ceon, Kim Ofstad, Yosef Wolde-Mariam, Tshawe Baqwa
- Producer: Element

Madcon singles chronology
"Liar" (2008)	"Glow" (2010)	"Freaky Like Me" (2010)

"Glow" is a song by the Norwegian urban duo Madcon. It was the first single released from their fourth album Contraband. The song was produced by the production team Element, and written by Element and Madcon. Madcon performed the song during the Eurovision Song Contest 2010 interval in Oslo, Norway.

== Eurovision Song Contest 2010 ==
The song was accompanied by a flash mob dance arranged by Element at various locations, showing collective dancing by hundreds of ordinary people in various locations including at the Telenor Arena where the event was being held, as well as (in order of appearance) at L'Alfàs del Pi (Spain), Reykjavík (Iceland), Ljubljana (Slovenia), Gothenburg (Sweden), Hamburg (Germany), Vilnius (Lithuania), London (United Kingdom), Düsseldorf (Germany), Dublin (Ireland).

Additional celebration footage was shown (in their order of appearance) from Malta, Lithuania, Iceland, Azerbaijan, Sweden, Russia, France, Turkey, Poland, Estonia, Portugal, Switzerland, the Netherlands, Albania, Ireland, Slovenia, Serbia, Norway, Germany, Denmark, Armenia, Romania, Latvia, Belarus, the United Kingdom, Croatia, Belgium, Georgia, Greece, Slovakia, Ukraine, Cyprus, live scenes from Hamburg (Germany), an individual in the North Sea (unidentified location), Moldova, Bulgaria, Bosnia and Herzegovina, Finland, Spain, and Israel.

== Track listings ==
Digital download

1. "Glow" – 3:50

German CD single

1. "Glow" (radio edit) - 3:49
2. "Glow" (extended version) - 7:36

== Chart performance ==
The single reached No. 1 on the Norwegian VG-lista singles chart for 10 consecutive weeks (weeks 23 to 32 of 2010). It also charted in other countries in Europe, including Germany (#4), Finland (#6), Ireland (#12), Austria (#14), Denmark (#16), Sweden (#17), Spain (#34), Switzerland (#38), the Netherlands (#59) and the UK (#70).

=== Charts ===
Chart (2010)	Peak position
Austria (Ö3 Austria Top 40)	14
Belgium (Ultratip Bubbling Under Flanders)	20
Belgium (Ultratip Bubbling Under Wallonia)	25
Czech Republic Airplay (ČNS IFPI)	41
Denmark (Tracklisten)	16
Germany (GfK)	4
Finland (Suomen virallinen lista)	6
Ireland (IRMA)	12
Netherlands (Single Top 100)	59
Norway (VG-lista)	1
Slovakia Airplay (ČNS IFPI)	8
Spain (PROMUSICAE)	34
Sweden (Sverigetopplistan)	17
Switzerland (Schweizer Hitparade)	38
UK Singles (OCC)	70

=== Year-end charts ===
Chart (2010)	Position
Austrian Singles Chart	50
European Hot 100 Singles	75
German Singles Chart	12

=== Certifications ===
Region	Certification	Certified units/sales
Austria (IFPI Austria)	Gold	15,000^{*}
Germany (BVMI)	Platinum	300,000^{^}
Norway (IFPI Norway)	10× Platinum	100,000^{*}
^{*} Sales figures based on certification alone.^{^} Shipments figures based on certification alone.

== See also ==
- List of number-one hits in Norway in 2010
