= Got a Little Drunk =

Single by Madcon
- Released: 5 May 2017
- Recorded: 2016
- Genre: Pop
- Length: 3:28
- Label: Sony Music Entertainment
- Songwriter(s): Justin Stein, Ki Fitzgerald, Josh Wilkinson, Yosef Wolde-Mariam, and Tshawe Baqwa

Madcon singles chronology
"Don't Stop Loving Me" (2016)	"Got a Little Drunk" (2017)	"Colling You" (2019)

"Got a Little Drunk" is a song by Norwegian urban duo Madcon. The song was released as a digital download in Norway on 5 May 2017 by Sony Music Entertainment. The song peaked at number 38 on the Norwegian Singles Chart.

== Music video ==
A music video to accompany the release of "Got a Little Drunk" was first released onto YouTube on 5 May 2017 at a total length of three minutes and twenty-nine seconds.

== Track listing ==
Digital download
No.	Title	Length
1.	"Got a Little Drunk"	3:28

== Charts ==
Chart (2017)	Peak position
Norway (VG-lista)	38

== Release history ==
Region	Date	Format	Label
Norway	5 May 2017	Digital download	Sony Music Entertainment
