= Sunrise (Alexandra Joner song) =

Single by Alexandra Joner featuring Madcon
- Released: 4 May 2012
- Recorded: 2011
- Genre: Pop
- Length: 3:50
- Label: Universal Music

Madcon singles chronology
"Helluva Nite" (2011)	"Sunrise" (2012)	"Kjører på" (2012)

"Sunrise" is a song by Norwegian singer Alexandra Joner. The song was released in Norway on 4 May 2012 for digital download. The song features vocals from Norwegian dance/hip hop duo Madcon. The song entered the Norwegian Singles Chart at number eight.

== Music video ==
A music video to accompany the release of "Sunrise" was first released onto YouTube on May 4, 2012 at a total length of three minutes and fifty-eight seconds.

== Track listings ==
Digital download
No.	Title	Length
1.	"Sunrise" (feat. Madcon)	3:50

== Chart performance ==
Chart (2012)	Peak position
Norway (VG-lista)	8

== Release history ==
Region	Date	Format	Label
Norway	4 May 2012	Digital download	Universal Music
