= Don't Worry (Madcon song) =

Single by Madcon featuring Ray Dalton
- Released: 20 February 2015
- Recorded: 2014
- Genre: Disco, funk, dance-pop
- Length: 3:34
- Label: Warner
- Songwriters: Teddy Sky, Johnny Powers Severin, Ray Dalton, Madcon
- Producer: Johnny Powers Severin

Madcon singles chronology
| "Say Yeah" (2013) | "Don't Worry" (2015) | "Keep My Cool" (2015) |

Ray Dalton singles chronology
| "Visceral" (2014) | "Don't Worry" (2015) | "Stronger" (2016) |

"Don't Worry" is a song by the Norwegian urban duo Madcon featuring vocals from American singer and songwriter Ray Dalton. It was written by Teddy Sky, Johnny Powers Severin and Madcon and was released in Norway as a digital download on 20 February 2015. The song peaked at number 4 on the Norwegian Singles Chart and reached the Top 10 in several countries.

== Composition ==
The song is written in 4/4, has a tempo of 123 bpm, and is in G major.

== Music video ==
A music video to accompany the release of "Don't Worry" was first released onto YouTube on 18 April 2015 at a total length of four minutes and six seconds.

An extraterrestrial (named Mr. Smiley) plummets to Earth and suffers a bad landing on a car. His tablet computer states that he is on Earth, and the population has the "Bored". He is given the mission to energize the bored population by casting 'Mad Smile', causing them to dance alongside Mr. Smiley. Markus Bailey was cast as Mr. Smiley a man from outer space wearing golden shoes and shedding joyful light. Madcon and Ray Dalton themselves also appear in the music video.

== Track listing ==
Digital download
| No. | Title | Length |
|---|---|---|
| 1. | "Don't Worry" (featuring Ray Dalton) | 3:34 |

German CD single
| No. | Title | Length |
|---|---|---|
| 1. | "Don't Worry" (featuring Ray Dalton) (radio version) | 3:35 |

== Charts ==
=== Weekly charts ===
2015 weekly chart performance
| Chart (2015) | Peak position |
|---|---|
| Australia (ARIA) | 82 |
| Austria (Ö3 Austria Top 40) | 2 |
| Belgium (Ultratop 50 Flanders) | 10 |
| Belgium Airplay (Ultratop Flanders) | 16 |
| Belgium Dance (Ultratop Flanders) | 19 |
| Belgium (Ultratop 50 Wallonia) | 15 |
| Belgium Airplay (Ultratop Wallonia) | 1 |
| Belgium Dance (Ultratop Wallonia) | 1 |
| CIS (Tophit) | 47 |
| Czech Republic Airplay (ČNS IFPI) | 1 |
| Denmark (Tracklisten) | 5 |
| France (SNEP) | 2 |
| Germany (GfK) | 3 |
| Hungary (Dance Top 40) | 18 |
| Hungary (Rádiós Top 40) | 1 |
| Hungary (Single Top 40) | 10 |
| Hungary (Stream Top 40) | 25 |
| Ireland (IRMA) | 63 |
| Italy (FIMI) | 6 |
| Netherlands (Dutch Top 40) | 3 |
| Netherlands (Single Top 100) | 10 |
| New Zealand (Recorded Music NZ) | 28 |
| Norway (VG-lista) | 4 |
| Poland Airplay (ZPAV) | 2 |
| Slovakia Airplay (ČNS IFPI) | 2 |
| Slovenia (SloTop50) | 6 |
| Spain (Promusicae) | 10 |
| Sweden (Sverigetopplistan) | 14 |
| Switzerland (Schweizer Hitparade) | 8 |
| UK Singles (Official Charts) | 54 |

2026 weekly chart performance
| Chart (2026) | Peak position |
|---|---|
| Kazakhstan Airplay (TopHit) | 31 |

=== Monthly charts ===
Monthly chart performance
| Chart (2026) | Peak position |
|---|---|
| Kazakhstan Airplay (TopHit) | 63 |

=== Year-end charts ===
| Chart (2015) | Position |
|---|---|
| Austria (Ö3 Austria Top 40) | 21 |
| Belgium (Ultratop Flanders) | 87 |
| Belgium (Ultratop Wallonia) | 93 |
| France (SNEP) | 56 |
| Germany (Official German Charts) | 21 |
| Hungary (Dance Top 40) | 84 |
| Hungary (Rádiós Top 40) | 5 |
| Hungary (Single Top 40) | 36 |
| Italy (FIMI) | 23 |
| Netherlands (Dutch Top 40) | 20 |
| Netherlands (Single Top 100) | 39 |
| Poland (ZPAV) | 9 |
| Spain (PROMUSICAE) | 63 |
| Sweden (Sverigetopplistan) | 85 |
| Switzerland (Schweizer Hitparade) | 24 |
| Chart (2016) | Position |
| France (SNEP) | 66 |
| Hungary (Dance Top 40) | 77 |
| Hungary (Rádiós Top 40) | 33 |

== Certifications ==
| Region | Certification | Certified units/sales |
|---|---|---|
| Austria (IFPI Austria) | Gold | 15,000^{‡} |
| Belgium (BRMA) | Gold | 10,000^{‡} |
| Denmark (IFPI Danmark) | 3× Platinum | 270,000^{‡} |
| France (SNEP) | Gold | 66,666^{‡} |
| Germany (BVMI) | 3× Gold | 600,000^{‡} |
| Italy (FIMI) | 3× Platinum | 150,000^{‡} |
| New Zealand (RMNZ) | Gold | 7,500^{*} |
| Norway (IFPI Norway) | 4× Platinum | 160,000^{‡} |
| Poland (ZPAV) | Platinum | 20,000^{‡} |
| Spain (Promusicae) | Platinum | 40,000^{‡} |
| Sweden (GLF) | Platinum | 40,000^{‡} |
| Switzerland (IFPI Switzerland) | Platinum | 30,000^{‡} |
| United Kingdom (BPI) | Silver | 200,000^{‡} |
^{*} Sales figures based on certification alone.^{‡} Sales+streaming figures based on certification alone.

== Release history ==
| Region | Date | Format | Label |
|---|---|---|---|
| Norway | 20 February 2015 | Digital download | Warner Music |
| United Kingdom | 21 August 2015 | Digital download | Parlophone Records |
