= The Color of Love (book) =

2015 book by Elizabeth Hordge-Freeman

The Color of Love: Racial Features, Stigma, and Socialization in Black Brazilian Families
- Author: Elizabeth Hordge-Freeman
- Language: English
- Genre: Sociology
- Publisher: University of Texas Press
- Publication date: November 2015
- Media type: Book
- Pages: 328
- ISBN: 978-1-4773-0788-5

The Color of Love: Racial Features, Stigma, and Socialization in Black Brazilian Families is a book by sociologist Elizabeth Hordge-Freeman published in 2015 by the University of Texas Press. The book details how racial hierarchies impact family interactions and treatment in Brazil and how these actions impact the well-being of the family members.

== Synopsis ==
Hordge-Freeman aims to examine the role that families play in race-making and race negotiation in Brazil. Specifically, she examines how families socialize race and teach their family members how to act appropriately in society according to their race. This is especially important since the majority of family studies research compares different families to each other instead of looking within families.

Hordge-Freeman argues that affective capital, which refers to experiences of love and affection, are unequally distributed in families. Specifically, white family members receive more affective capital than darker family members. Hordge-Freeman goes further to explain the consequences of this imbalance and how it negatively impacts the psychological well-being of darker family members. Hordge-Freeman also analyzes how Afro-Brazilians have to manipulate their image in order to look more professional and acceptable by society, which Hordge-Freeman refers to embodied capital. Examples of this include changing hairstyles and dressing in clean and professional clothes. Lastly, Hordge-Freeman examines the racial fluency tendencies of families, which pertain to their responses to racism. The family can either choose to accept these racist ideas or actively resist them.

The book is broken into three parts. Part 1 focuses on how families operate in Brazil and their role in racial socialization. In addition, Part 1 also explores how racial stigma affects familial relationships. Part 1 consists of three chapters. Part 2 focuses on how racial socialization from the family translates to behaviors in the public sphere, examines three families that are racially transgressive and their attempt to resist racism, and a conclusion. Part 2 contains four chapters. Lastly, an appendix explaining how interviews were conducted is offered at the end.

=== Part 1 ===
Part 1 begins by arguing that families normalize racial stigma and further it in Brazil. Hordge-Freeman uses examples from observations and interviews. For example, one family is anxious about the color of their unborn child because they view African features as bad and ugly. Although the child is born with mostly white features, she possesses a wide nose, which is considered black. Thus, the mother participates in a common practice in Brazil in which she pinches the baby's nose for thirty seconds to narrow it. The mother not only does this voluntarily, but by the pressure from neighbors and other family members. Interviews with other families affirm the desire for the baby to have white characteristics, such as a narrow nose, light skin, and straight hair. These desires influence how the child is treated once they are born, as darker children are given less attention, praise, love than their whiter siblings. Part 1 also examines how this dynamic plays out in interracial relationships, as families tend to reject the darker partner of their family member. However, resistance is examined in Brazil as more Afro-Brazilian do not hesitate to say that they are negra and keep their natural hair instead of straightening it. Unfortunately, some families reject other family members when these actions are taken. The last section of Part 1 addresses how stigma and differential treatment damages the psychological well-being of Afro-Brazilians.

=== Part 2 ===
Part 2 focuses on how people identify themselves racially and color-wise so that they can navigate society. Most Afro-Brazilians who would be considered preta identity as morena, a vague racial term to identify anyone of color. Also, when asked to identify others, people tend to use the term morena to make sure they do not offend anybody. Race is also impacted by wealth and class, as poor Afro-Brazilians with light skin are still considered negra and wealthier Afro-Brazilians with darker skin are considered morena. This refers to racial fluency and how people learn how to identify race appropriately. This chapter also reveals how families tend to ignore their African heritage completely and are unaware of the history of slavery and what happened after slavery was abolished. This section then progressed to talk about how Afro-Brazilians navigate the public sphere, specifically by tolerating racism at the work place, avoiding certain white places, and learning how to act during social events. Lastly, the author explores how racially transgressive families behave differently. These families embrace their race by acknowledging racism exists, talking about their African heritage, and talking about instances where racism occurs, although humor is often used to address these situations. These families tend to be more aware about the history of Afro-Brazilians and embrace their African features like their hair.

== Critical reception ==
Critical reviews of The Color of Love: Racial Features, Stigma and Socialization of Black Brazilian Families are mostly positive. Jan Hoffman French, an anthropology professor at the University of Richmond, did not have a negative comment about the book in her review. In fact, she states that this book is, "an important contribution to the growing academic literature on race and color in Brazil." She also praises the clarity in which the book was written, in which she states that, "This book is readable, while being nuanced and sophisticated, making it useful in a variety of settings..."

The critical review by Andrew Kettler, then a history professor at the University of Toronto, echoes these compliments about the book. However, Kettler offers more criticisms of the book, which include lack of quantitative data and also questions the reliability of depending on scenarios that happened to one specific family to make broader implications of Brazilian society as a whole. However, overall Kettler praises the book as he states, "In summary, the reader is delivered a cynical though decidedly interesting summary of how racial and phenotypic ideals perpetuate within Brazilian families.”

== Awards ==
- Winner of 2016 Section on the Sociology of Emotions Outstanding Recent Contribution (Book) Award at the American Sociology Association
- 2016 Finalist at the Harlem Book Fair/ Phyllis Wheatley First Non-Fiction Book Award
- 2017 Charles Horton Cooley Award for Recent Book, Society for the Study of Symbolic Interaction
