= Icon (Madcon album) =

Studio album by Madcon
- Released: 27 September 2013
- Genre: Hip hop; rap
- Label: Cosmos
- Producer: Astma; Element; Rocwell; Stargate; TJ Oosterhuis

Madcon chronology
Contakt (2012)	Icon (2013)	Contakt Vol. 2 (2018)

Singles from Icon
- 1. "In My Head" Released: 4 February 2013; 2. "One Life" Released: 17 May 2013; 3. "The Signal" Released: December 2013; 4. "Say Yea!"

Icon is the sixth studio album by Norwegian urban duo Madcon. It was released on 27 September 2013. The album debuted at number one on the Norwegian Albums Chart.

== Track listing ==
No.	Title	Writer(s)	Length
1.	"Say Yeah" (featuring Stori)	Taj Jackson; Kim Ofstad; Hitesh Ceon; Yosef Woldemariam; Tshawe Baqwa; Tori Diaz	3:39
2.	"One Life" (featuring Kelly Rowland)	Kelly Rowland; TJ Oosterhuis; Woldemariam; Baqwa; Katerina Bramley	3:30
3.	"Unbreakable"	Tor Erik Hermansen; Ofstad; Ceon; Woldemariam; Baqwa; Eric Saade; Julimar "J-Son" Santos	4:11
4.	"Is You with Me" (featuring Snoop Lion)	Jackson; Calvin Broadus; Ofstad; Ceon; Woldemariam; Baqwa	3:18
5.	"Where Nobody's Gone Before" (featuring Estelle)	Estelle Swaray; Allan Eshuijs; Oosterhuis; Woldemariam; Baqwa	3:47
6.	"In My Head"	Jackson; Ofstad; Ceon; Woldemariam; Baqwa	4:06
7.	"The Signal"	Jackson; Ofstad; Ceon; Woldemariam; Baqwa	3:51
8.	"Bottles" (featuring Rick Ross)	Jackson; William Roberts II; Ofstad; Ceon; Woldemariam; Baqwa	3:47
9.	"Miracle" (featuring Range)	Ofstad; Ceon; Woldemariam; Baqwa; Theodore "Range" Bowen	3:33
10.	"Drifting Apart"	Jackson; Ofstad; Ceon; Woldemariam; Baqwa	3:44
11.	"Mirage"	Tobias Jimson; Michel Flygare; Woldemariam; Baqwa	3:16
12.	"In My Head" (Paul Oakenfold Remix)		5:38

== Charts ==
Chart (2013)	Peak position
Norwegian Albums Chart	1

== Release history ==
Region	Release date	Format	Label
Norway	27 September 2013	Digital download	Cosmos Music Norway AS
