= RM47 =

American pop music group

- Origin: Los Angeles, California
- Genres: alternative R&B; electro
- Years active: 2021–present
- Label: GRDN
- Members: MAAD; Raleigh
- Website: www.rm47rm47rm47.com

RM47 is an American alternative R&B-electro duo formed in 2021 by singer-songwriter and DJ MAAD and producer, songwriter, and sound engineer Raleigh. The duo debuted with the single Needed U and released their debut studio album Stuck with You But I Like It in 2023. In 2025, RM47 performed at major U.S. music festivals including SXSW and the Coachella, and released their second studio album, Cyber.

== Formation and Early years ==
RM47 was formed in 2021 by American singer-songwriter and DJ MAAD (Natasha Ferguson) and American producer, songwriter, and sound engineer Raleigh Dunn. The two began collaborating during the early stages of Ferguson's career under the project name MAAD*MOISELLE, after meeting in New York City. At the time, Raleigh was part of the production collective TheVamp, which worked on MAAD's early releases.

After both artists relocated to Los Angeles in 2018, they continued working together on MAAD's solo material. In 2021, they decided to establish RM47 as a joint project, shifting their focus toward a collaborative band format within the alternative R&B genre, incorporating electronic and EDM influences.

RM47 debuted on June 30, 2021, with the single Needed U. The song received radio airplay in Italy and was later followed by a remix version featuring rapper Nez. In 2022, the duo released the singles Strangers and BEETGOZON, the latter featuring Prince African Child. In 2023, RM47 released Running Back, which preceded their debut studio album Stuck with You But I Like It, released on June 27, 2023. The album consists of 11 tracks and was primarily written and produced by the duo, with additional songwriting contributions from Rush Davis, Travis Mendes, Stuart Bascombe, Brahim Gousse, and Iman Jordan. The project features guest appearances from Devontèe and Prince African Child.

In September 2023, RM47 performed as an opening act for Qveen Herby during her Los Angeles shows. In the same period the duo released the single Hotline.

In 2024, RM47 released a series of singles, beginning with Gimme Dat in March, followed by Buss It in May and Le Fix in September. During the same year, the duo performed at several festivals across the United States, including the Shabang Festival, and received editorial support from Spotify through inclusion on the Our Frequency playlist.

In 2025, RM47 released the single FYF in February and performed at the SXSW, followed by an appearance at the 2025 Coachella DoLaB. The duo collaborated with Aluna's record label Noir Fever Records, in partnership with EMPIRE, releasing the singles Grab A Plate featuring Aluna and Farrah Fawx, as well as Veins.

On May 28, 2025, RM47 released the single Underwater, which preceded their second studio album Cyber, released on August 15, 2025. The album consists of eight tracks and was written and produced by RM47, with additional contributions from K. Le Maestro, Travis Mendes, Liana Banks, and Linda Nàpoles. On December 9, 2025, RM47 were featured on Black Party's album Last Call on the track Still Can't Feel My Face.

== Discography ==
=== Album ===
- 2023 – Stuck with You But I Like it
- 2025 – Cyber
- 2026 – Cyber [Reboot]

=== Singles ===
- 2021 – Needed U
- 2022 – Strangers
- 2022 – BEETGOZON (feat. Prince African Child)
- 2023 – Running Back
- 2023 – Hotline
- 2024 – Gimme Dat
- 2024 – Buss It
- 2024 – Le Fix
- 2025 – FYF
- 2025 – Grab a Plate (feat. Aluna, Farrah Fawx)
- 2025 – Veins
- 2025 – Underwater

==== as featured ====
- 2025 – Still Can't Feel My Face (Black Party feat. RM47)
