= Tjeerd Oosterhuis =

Dutch music producer (born 1971)

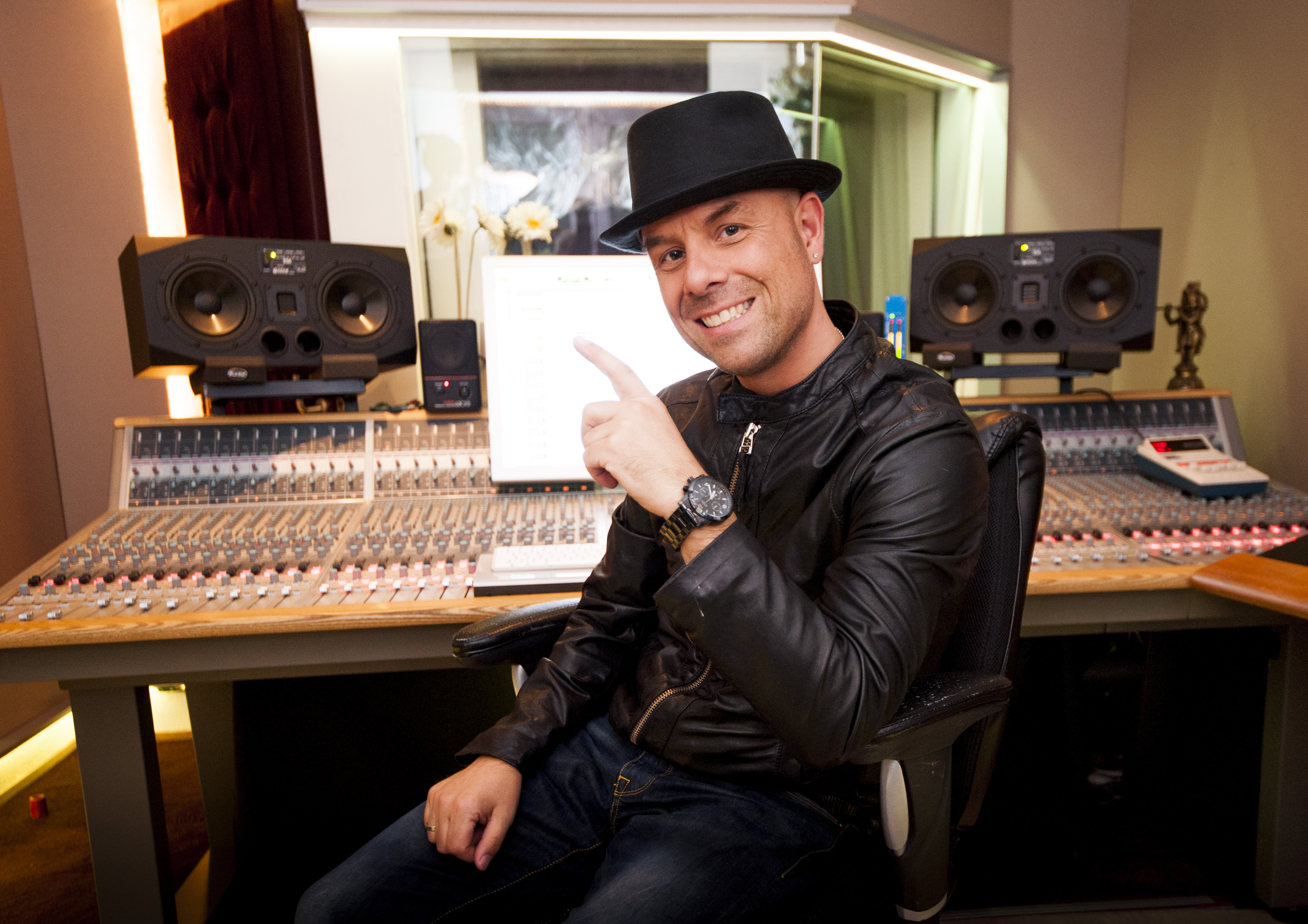
- Oosterhuis in 2013
- Born: Tjeerd-Pieter David Oosterhuis; 25 December 1971 (age 54); Amsterdam, the Netherlands
- Other names: TJ Oosterhuis
- Years active: 1996–present
- Known for: Music songwriter; composer; arranger; producer; pianist

Tjeerd-Pieter David Oosterhuis (Dutch pronunciation: [tɕeːrt ˈoːstərɦœys]; born 25 December 1971), also known as TJ Oosterhuis, is a Dutch musician, songwriter and producer mostly known for his work with Kinderen voor Kinderen. He worked with many artists.

== Early life ==
Oosterhuis was born and raised in Amsterdam, the Netherlands. He is the son of writer, theologian and former priest Huub Oosterhuis.

== Career ==
With his younger sister and singer Trijntje Oosterhuis, Tjeerd formed the mid-1990s band Total Touch.

After Total Touch disbanded in 1997, Oosterhuis founded music production company DEMP, and produced the album Face to Face for his wife, Edsilia Rombley in 2002, and a solo album for his sister Trijntje in 2003.

In 2005 he wrote and produced "Als Je Iets Kan Doen" (English: If You Can Do Something) under the name Artiesten Voor Azië (English: Artists For Asia) to benefit the victims of the 2004 Indian Ocean earthquake and tsunami.

In 2008, Lisa, Amy & Shelley are the winners of the Junior Songfestival and Oosterhuis is hired to co-write and produce their upcoming debut album.

In 2010, his production of "Freaky Like Me" for Madcon (ft. Ameerah) was a number 1 hit in Norway. It went four times platinum there and received a gold certification in Germany.

From 2011 until 2022 Oosterhuis wrote and produced music for Kinderen Voor Kinderen (English: Children for Children).

In February 2014, the Ladies of Soul show premieres. The project is initiated and produced by Oosterhuis and features Trijntje Oosterhuis (2014–2016), Berget Lewis, Edsilia Rombley, Glennis Grace and saxophone player/singer Candy Dulfer. In April, a live registration is released on both CD and DVD. Several editions more followed. In June 2022, Tjeerd released his solo album, a neo-classical piano album for the Andante Piano label under his own name.
