= Freaky Like Me =

Single by Madcon

Single by Madcon featuring Ameerah

from the album Contraband
- Released: 20 September 2010
- Recorded: 2010
- Length: 3:09
- Label: Cosmos Music Norway
- Songwriters: Ameerah, Arjang "DreamRoc'a" Shishegar, TJ Oosterhuis, Tshawe Baqwa & Yosef Wolde-Mariam
- Producers: DreamRoc'a, TJ Oosterhuis

Madcon singles chronology
"Glow" (2010)	"Freaky Like Me" (2010)	"Outrun the Sun" (2010)

Ameerah singles chronology
"The Sound of Missing You" (2010)	"Freaky Like Me" (2010)

Music video
- "Freaky like Me" on YouTube

"Freaky Like Me" is a song by the Norwegian urban duo Madcon, released on 20 September 2010 as the second single from their fourth album, Contraband. The song features vocals from Belgian-Tunisian singer Ameerah, and was written by Ameerah, TJ Oosterhuis, Arjang "DreamRoc'a" Shishegar, Tshawe Baqwa and Yosef Wolde-Mariam and produced by Norwegian producer DreamRoc'a, also known as Sha, and TJ Oosterhuis. It reached number one in Norway, making the song their third number one in the country and their third-biggest international hit.

== Track listing ==
Digital download
No.	Title	Lyrics	Length
1.	"Freaky Like Me"	Ameerah, Arjang "DreamRoc'a" Shishegar, TJ Oosterhuis, Tshawe Baqwa & Yosef Wolde-Mariam	3:09

German premium CD single

1. "Freaky Like Me" (feat. Ameerah) – 3:10
2. "Glow" (Radio Edit) – 3:49

German standard CD single

1. "Freaky Like Me" (feat. Ameerah) (Main Mix) – 3:06
2. "Freaky Like Me" (feat. Ameerah) (Instrumental) – 3:06

== Credits and personnel ==
- Lead vocals – Madcon
- Backing vocals – DreamRoc'a
- Female vocals – Ameerah
- Music – ≈ Arjang "DreamRoc'a" Shishegar, TJ Oosterhuis
- Lyrics – Ameerah, Arjang "DreamRoc'a" Shishegar, TJ Oosterhuis, Tshawe Baqwa & Yosef Wolde-Mariam

== Charts ==
=== Weekly charts ===
Weekly chart performance for "Freaky Like Me"
Chart (2010–11)	Peak position
Austria (Ö3 Austria Top 40)	11
Belgium (Ultratip Bubbling Under Flanders)	12
Czech Republic Airplay (ČNS IFPI)	38
European Hot 100 Singles (Billboard)	38
Finland (Suomen virallinen lista)	9
German Downloads Chart (Media Control)	8
Germany (GfK)	9
Germany Airplay (Nielsen)	10
Norway (VG-lista)	1
Poland (ZPAV)	4
Poland (Dance Top 50)	48
Romania (Romanian Top 100)	2
Russia Airplay (TopHit)	5
Switzerland (Schweizer Hitparade)	6
UK Singles (OCC)	46
UK Hip Hop/R&B (OCC)	14
Ukraine Airplay (TopHit)	12

=== Year-end charts ===
2010 year-end chart performance for "Freaky Like Me"
Chart (2010)	Position
Germany (Official German Charts)	78
Russia Airplay (TopHit)	68

2011 year-end chart performance for "Freaky Like Me"
Chart (2011)	Position
Germany (Official German Charts)	65
Romania (Romanian Top 100)	21
Russia Airplay (TopHit)	43
Switzerland (Schweizer Hitparade)	73
Ukraine Airplay (TopHit)	47

2012 year-end chart performance for "Freaky Like Me"
Chart (2012)	Position
Russia Airplay (TopHit)	195

== Certifications and sales ==
Certifications for Freaky Like Me
Region	Certification	Certified units/sales
Austria (IFPI Austria)	Gold	15,000^{*}
Germany (BVMI)	Gold	150,000^{^}
Norway (IFPI Norway)	4× Platinum	40,000^{*}
^{*} Sales figures based on certification alone.^{^} Shipments figures based on certification alone.

== See also ==
- List of number-one hits in Norway in 2010
