= Helluva Nite =

Single by Madcon featuring Maad*Moiselle

from the album Contraband
- Released: 26 September 2011
- Recorded: 2010
- Genre: Pop
- Length: 3:12
- Label: Cosmos Music Norway
- Songwriters: Jonas Jeberg, Christopher Bridges, Marcus John Bryant, Nakisha Smith, Tshawe Baqwa, Yosef Wolde-Mariam
- Producer: Jonas Jeberg

Madcon singles chronology
"Outrun the Sun" (2010)	"Helluva Nite" (2011)	"Sunrise" (2012)

"Helluva Nite" is an English-language song by the Norwegian urban duo Madcon featuring vocals from Maad*Moiselle. Even though Ludacris is featured on the album, Madcon decided not to put him in the single. It is the fourth single released from their fourth album Contraband. The song was written by Jonas Jeberg, Christopher Bridges, Marcus John Bryant, Nakisha Smith, Tshawe Baqwa and Yosef Wolde-Mariam. It was released on the 26 September 2011. In Germany Itchy from Culcha Candela is featured for the single release.

== Music video ==
A music video to accompany the release of "Helluva Nite" was first released onto YouTube on 7 September 2011 at a total length of three minutes and fifteenth seconds.

== Track listing ==
Digital download
No.	Title	Length
1.	"Helluva Nite" (featuring Maad*Moiselle)	3:12

== Credits and personnel ==
- Lead vocals – Madcon and Maad*Moiselle
- Lyrics – Jonas Jeberg, Christopher Bridges, Marcus John Bryant, Nakisha Smith, Tshawe Baqwa, Yosef Wolde-Mariam
- Label – Cosmos Music Norway

== Chart performance ==
Chart (2011)	Peak position
Norway (VG-lista)	10

== Release history ==
Country	Date	Format	Label
Norway	26 September 2011	Digital download	Cosmos Music Norway
