= Ameerah (singer) =

Belgian singer and songwriter (born 1983)

- Born: Astrid Roelants; 18 April 1983 (age 43)
- Origin: Leuven, Belgium
- Genres: Pop music; Eurodance
- Occupations: Singer; songwriter
- Years active: 2003–present
- Label: Sony Music

Astrid Roelants (Dutch pronunciation: [ˈɑstrɪt ˈrulɑnts]; born 18 April 1983), known professionally as Ameerah, is a Belgian singer and songwriter based in Los Angeles, United States.

== Early life ==
Roelants was raised by adoptive parents in Leuven, Flemish Brabant. She is of Tunisian and Algerian descent.

== Career ==
In 2003, Roelants was a contestant in the first season of Idool, the Belgian version of the Idol franchise. She participated in the live shows and got a record deal right after. In 2004, she competed to represent Belgium in the Eurovision Song Contest 2004 with the song "Don't Stop the Music", placing seventh in the national final. With the song she achieved chart success in Belgium.

In 2009, her single "The Sound of Missing You" became an international hit, reaching number three on the Billboard Hot Dance Airplay chart in the United States. A remixed version by Wildboyz released in 2010 charted in Belgium, the Netherlands and Romania.

In 2010, Roelants appeared as a featured artist on the single "Freaky Like Me" by the Norwegian duo Madcon. The song charted in Austria, Belgium, Germany, Poland, Romania and the United Kingdom, and reached number one on the Norwegian singles chart. She achieved a golden record in Germany and went double platinum in Norway. Roelants has also featured in songs by Regi, Turbo B and Schiller.

In November 2022, Roelants was announced as one of seven participants in Eurosong 2023, the Belgian national selection for the Eurovision Song Contest 2023. Her candidate entries "Armageddon" and "The Carnival" were both co-written with American singer-songwriter Zac Poor and produced by Morgan Taylor Reid. She ultimately selected "The Carnival" as her entry for the final, held on 14 January 2023.

== Discography ==
=== Singles ===
==== As lead artist ====
Title	Year	Peak chart positions	
Title	Year	BEL (FL)	US (HDA)
"Don't You Stop the Music" (as Astrid)	2004	20	—
"However" (as Astrid)	2004	Tip(7)	—
"The Sound of Missing You"	2009	—	3
"Tears to Dust" (with Regi)	2010	—	—
"The Carnival"	2023	—	—

==== As featured artist ====
Single	Year	Peak chart positions										
Single	Year	BEL (FL)	BEL (WA)	AUT	FIN	GER	NED	NOR	ROM	SWI	UK	UK (R&B)
"The Sound of Missing You" (Wildboyz featuring Ameerah)	2010	22	Tip(11)	—	—	—	44	—	2	—	—	—
"Freaky Like Me" (Madcon featuring Ameerah)	2010	Tip(12)	—	11	9	9	—	1	2	6	46	14
"We Be Hot" (Regi & Turbo B featuring Ameerah)	2010	9	—	—	—	—	—	—	—	—	—	—
"Dancing in the Dark" (Schiller featuring Ameerah)	2012	—	—	—	—	—	—	—	—	—	—	—
