= An InCONvenient Truth =

Studio album by Madcon
- Released: 2 December 2008
- Recorded: 2008
- Genre: Urban
- Label: Bonnier Amigo Music Norway AS
- Producer: 3Elementz

Madcon chronology
So Dark the Con of Man (2007)	An InCONvenient Truth (2008)	Contraband (2010)

Singles from An InCONvenient Truth
- 1. "Liar" Released: 2008

An InCONvenient Truth is the third album by the Norwegian urban music duo Madcon. It was released in December 2008. It peaked at number 8 on the Norwegian Albums Chart.

== Track listing ==
No.	Title	Length
1.	"2000 ´N AA"	3:15
2.	"Liar"	3:09
3.	"The Sweetest Drug"	3:28
4.	"Wholehearted"	3:41
5.	"Give It A Try"	3:33
6.	"What If"	3:09
7.	"Hate-O-Rade"	3:30
8.	"A Conversation"	1:16
9.	"Hope"	3:59
10.	"Waiting On You"	3:21
11.	"O-S-L-O"	3:30
12.	"Gone"	3:39

== Personnel ==
- Bass guitar - Jonny Sjo (tracks: 1, 2, 4 to 8, 10 to 12)
- Drums - Kim Ofstad
- Instruments - Hitesh Ceon
- Mastered by Bjørn Engelmann*
- Producer - 3Elementz
- Recorded and mixed by 3Elementz
- Written by Hitesh Ceon, Jonny Sjo, Kim Ofstad, Sofian Benzaim* (tracks: 9), Tshawe Baqwa, Yosef Wolde-Mariam

== Chart performance ==
Chart (2008/2009)	Peak position
Norwegian Albums Chart	8
