= Contakt =

Studio album by Madcon
- Released: 21 June 2012
- Recorded: 2011
- Genres: Hip-hop, rap
- Language: Norwegian
- Label: Cosmos

Madcon chronology
Contraband (2010)	Contakt (2012)	Icon (2013)

Contakt is the fifth studio album by the Norwegian urban music duo Madcon. It was released on 21 June 2012. The album entered the Norwegian Albums Chart at number 18. This is the first album recorded entirely in their native language.

== Track listing ==
No.	Title	Length
1.	"Jaget" (feat. Chirag)	4:07
2.	"Snu deg rundt" (feat. Kaveh)	3:19
3.	"Kjører på" (feat. Timbuktu)	3:36
4.	"Frank Murdah" (feat. Admiral P & Nico D)	3:37
5.	"Sjokk" (feat. Envy)	3:34
6.	"Villdyr" (feat. Jesse Jones & Onkl P)	3:07
7.	"Fåkke fly bort" (feat. Maria Mena)	2:48
8.	"Ha deg bort" (feat. Dreamon)	3:48
9.	"Paff"	3:34
10.	"Nordlyset"	3:39
11.	"Flus"	3:55
12.	"OiOiOi" (feat. Pumba)	3:50
13.	"Hold min hånd"	3:53
14.	"Sire' som det er" (feat. Lyset)	4:21
15.	"Vi flyr"	3:53
16.	"Vålenga"	3:52
17.	"Hummer & kavviar" (feat. Vinni)	5:04
18.	"Sug'n da" (bonus track feat. Chirag)	3:53
19.	"Å lø" (bonus track)	3:12
20.	"Fest på smedstad vest" (bonus track feat. Tina & Bettina, official music for Tina & Bettina the Movie)	3:43

== Singles ==
1. Å Lø
2. Fest På Smedstad Vest
3. Fåkke Fly Bort
4. Kjører På

== Charts ==
Chart (2012)	Peak position
Norwegian Albums Chart	4

== Release history ==
Region	Release date	Format	Label
Norway	21 June 2012	Digital download	Cosmos Music Norway AS
