= Paperboys (Norwegian duo) =

Norwegian hip hop duo

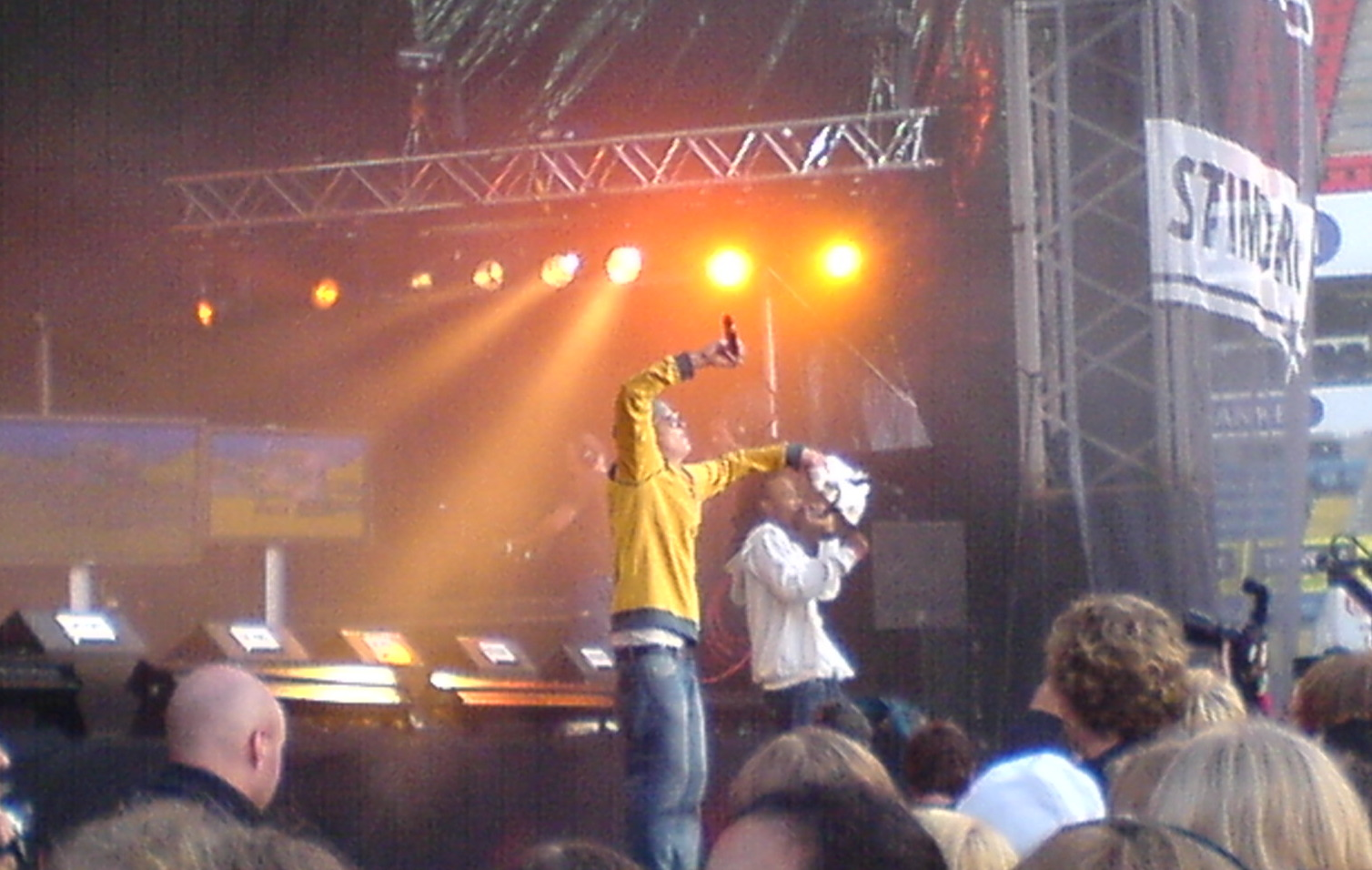
- Paperboys performing in 2006

Background information
- Origin: Norway
- Genres: Hip hop
- Years active: 2002–present
- Labels: Bonnier Amigo
- Members: Øyvind "Vinni" Sauvik; Ole Alexander "Pope Dawg" Halstensgård

Paperboys is a Norwegian hip hop duo consisting of rapper Øyvind "Vinni" Sauvik and DJ Ole Alexander "Pope Dawg" Halstensgård. The duo has released four albums and their debut included Barcelona, a collaboration with Madcon which was a hit in Norway. After this the pair released several hit singles in Norway but with little to no notable acclaim outside the country. Most of the duo's work uses other artists and relies heavily on YouTube advertising and word of mouth. Including "Moving Up" Featuring Keith & Kleen Cut, "It's Paper", and their most recent hit, "Lonesome Traveller", and they also collaborated with Madcon on their European hit "Back on the Road". The band won the hip hop Spellemannprisen in 2002 and 2005. Paperboys made their return in 2016 with the 'Be Like Water EP', and have continued with an additional single, 'Go Ahead'.

== Discography ==
=== Albums ===
Year	Album	Peak position	Certifications
Year	Album	NOR	Certifications
2002	No Cure for Life	6	
2003	The Great Escape	3	
2005	When Worlds Collide	13	
2006	So Far So Good... Songs & Singles	4	
2009	The Oslo Agreement	4	
2016	Be Like Water EP	0	

=== Singles ===
Year	Single	Peak chart positions	Album
Year	Single	NOR	Album
2002	"Barcelona" (feat. Madcon)	12	
2002	"Find My Way"	11	
2003	"What You Need"	5	
2003	"On the Low"	13	
2004	"One Day"	4	
2005	"Wiggle It"	9	
2005	"Keep It Cool"	9	
2009	"Lonesome Traveler"	1	
2016	"Go Ahead"	36	
