= Element (production team) =

- Origin: Oslo, Norway
- Genres: Soul, hip hop, pop
- Occupation: Producing
- Years active: 2009–2016
- Members: Hitesh Ceon; Kim Ofstad
- Website: elementmusicworld.com

Element (stylized as ELEMENT) was an Icelandic/Norwegian record production and songwriting team, consisting of Hitesh Ceon and Kim Ofstad. The team was disbanded in January 2016. On their website Hitesh is described as being the main producer and composer of the team, while Kim is the drummer, and described as the more social/networking part of the team.

Element in 2013 produced eight songs on the Madcon album Icon, including the song "Bottles" featuring Rick Ross, and "Is You With Me" featuring Snoop Dogg. The first single, "In My Head", spent several weeks at number one on the Norwegian iTunes chart and peaked at number 2 on the official Norwegian sales charts, selling three times platinum.

Some of the later productions of the team included two songs for Alexandra Burke, "Dangerous" and "Bury Me (6 Feet Under)", as well as Michael Jackson's "I Want You Back" (ELEMENT Remix), and a remix of Michael Jackson's "Skywriter" (Stargate Remix) which they produced together with Stargate, the latter two featured on the 2009 remix album, The Remix Suite.

Element in 2014 produced the song "Till The Rope Gives Way" with Joe, on the album Bridges. The album reached number one on the iTunes R&B Chart in the US. Element produced the song "Yes" for Musiq Soulchild, the second official single from Musiq's album MusiqInTheMagiq, as well as two other songs on the album, "Lovecontract" and "Clumsylove".

Element produced the song "It's Ok" for Cee Lo Green. The song is the second official single from Cee-Lo Green's album The Lady Killer, and is written by Hitesh Ceon, Kim Ofstad, Cee Lo Green and Noel Fisher. The album The Lady Killer received a Grammy nomination.

Element has produced and co-written the song "Glow" for Madcon. A 7:30 minute long version of the song was performed in the final of the Eurovision Song Contest 2010, during the interval before the voting. While the song was playing many flash-mobs around Europe were dancing a choreographed dance to the song and Madcon performed in the Telenor Arena where the contest was held. The song was released on iTunes the same day, and reached number one in Norway and Germany, number 2 in Spain and top 10 in 10 other countries. It has sold 10 times platinum in Norway and over 300.000 copies in Germany.

Element was earlier known as 3Elementz, then a three-member team, including bass-player Jonny Sjo. Their productions include Madcon's "Beggin'" which went to become 8× platinum in Norway, before reaching top position on the hit lists in many European countries, and reaching number 2 position on the Billboard European chart.
