= Madcon =

South African-Ethiopian-Norwegian hip hop duo

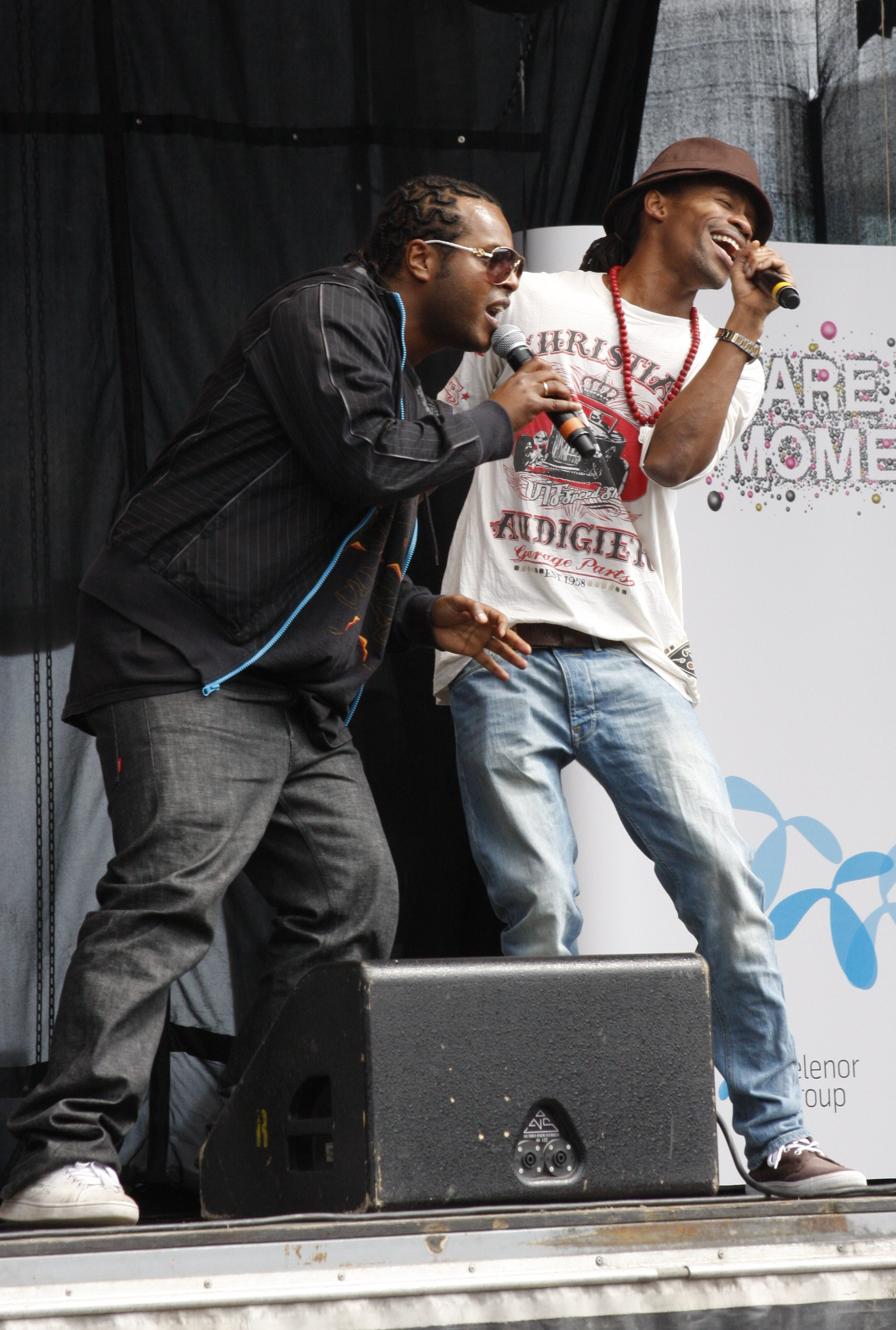
- Wolde-Mariam (left) and Baqwa in May 2010

Background information
- Origin: Oslo, Norway
- Genres: Electropop; dance-pop; hip hop; Eurodance
- Instruments: Vocals
- Years active: 1992–present
- Labels: Cosmos; Columbia; Sony; Nasty Kutt; Bonnier Amigo Music Norway AS; RCA; Universal Republic; Warner; Just
- Members: Yosef Wolde-Mariam; Tshawe Baqwa
- Website: Madcon official website

Madcon is a Norwegian musical duo formed in 1992 by Yosef Wolde-Mariam and Tshawe Baqwa. They have released eight albums as of 2018, and became known for their 2007 interpolation of the 1967 song "Beggin'" by The Four Seasons. They took their name from the phrase "mad conspiracy".

== Members ==
=== Yosef Wolde-Mariam ===
Yosef Wolde-Mariam (born August 4, 1978) is an Ethiopian-Norwegian TV presenter and rapper. His parents were from Ethiopia and Eritrea.

Wolde-Mariam grew up in Grefsen, Norway with his mother, moving many times, living in Røyken, Grønland, Grünerløkka, and Bekkelaget.

In 2012, and from 2015 to 2025, he was a mentor on the Norwegian version of The Voice, known as The Voice: Norges beste stemme, broadcast on TV 2. In 2025, Wolde-Mariam became the winning coach with his artist Andrea Holm.

=== Tshawe Baqwa ===
Tshawe Baqwa (born January 6, 1980, in Saarbrücken, West Germany) is a South African-German-Norwegian rapper and TV presenter.

In 1994, Baqwa moved to South Africa with his parents when he was 14 years old, in the wake of the country's first democratic general election, eventually going back to Norway for a musical career.

In 2007, Baqwa took part and won the third season of the Norwegian dance contest Skal vi danse? (lit. "Shall we dance?"), broadcast on TV 2. Although the judges ultimately favored finalist Mona Grudt, Baqwa won by public vote. He also performed as a voice-over artist in the 2011 film Rio, playing the character Nico.

== Career ==
Madcon released their first single, "God Forgive Me", in 2000 for Virgin Records, but their first commercial breakthrough came with the hit single "Barcelona" in 2002, which they issued with long-time collaborators Paperboys on the "Bonnier Amigo" record label, a division of Cosmos Music Group, headquartered in Stockholm, Sweden.

In 2004, the duo released their first official album, It's All a Madcon, through AA-Recordings/Bonnier Amigo label, for which they won a Norwegian Grammy and several other awards.

In 2005, Madcon became a TV personality on the Nordic music channel "The Voice" while working on their music in the studio. The show "The Voice of Madcon", a behind-the-scenes look at the duo, was a great success for both Madcon and the network.

In the autumn of 2007, Baqwa was invited to take part in the popular TV talent show Skal vi danse?, the Norwegian version of Strictly Come Dancing, eventually winning that year's series, the third season of the TV program. Their second album, So Dark, The Con of Man, was released on December 3, 2007: in the United Kingdom, it reached number 137 on the album charts, and in Norway was certified gold in 3 hours and platinum in 3 days. The LP featured the soul singer Noora Noor and their friends "Paperboys" on two songs.

In 2007, the duo released an interpolation of the 1967 song "Beggin'" by The Four Seasons, earning the group several #1 chart positions in France, Portugal, Norway, and Russia and a global position of #2 on the European Billboard Hot 100 chart. This version of the song reached also gold sales in the United States. In addition, they achieved 9× platinum in Norway and were No. 1 on the official Norwegian sales charts for 12 weeks, making "Beggin'" one of the biggest hits of all time in Norway. This cover of the song was created by 3Elementz (now ELEMENT), who also produced the eponymous single of the album, "So Dark, The Con of Man".

Madcon led the World Music Awards on November 10, 2008, and won the World's Best Selling Norwegian Artist Award. After several negotiations, their label Bonnier Amigo signed a licensing agreement with Sony BMG for Central Europe, Great Britain, Australia, and New Zealand, with Universal Republic in the U.S., with Warner Music in Spain, and with Just Music in South Africa. Madcon has also hosted the Norwegian version of Don't Forget the Lyrics!, Kan du Teksten?, on the Norwegian television channel "TV 2".

The duo's third album, Inconvenient Truth, was released all over Europe in early-to-mid 2009 and was also produced by "ELEMENT"; the group also saw other major releases, including in the U.S., Japan, and Australia.

Madcon performed their song "Glow" as the background of the "Eurovision 2010 Flashmob Dance", broadcast in the Eurovision Song Contest 2010 interval act. The single became one of the biggest hits of all time in Norway, reaching more than 10× platinum status in Norway and the same certification in Germany; also this recording was produced by ELEMENT. They reached platinum status also with their 2010 hit single "Freaky Like Me", featuring Ameerah and produced by Dutch musician DreamRoc'a, also known as Sha Arjang Shishegar or TJ Oosterhuis; "Freaky Like Me" is the group's third biggest international hit.

In 2011, the duo was awarded the International Band of the Year during the "ESKA Music Awards 2011" in Poland.

In 2012, Madcon was referred to as "moccha men" during the ceremony of Spellemannsprisen, a Norwegian award for musicians; the comment was apparently made as an inoffensive joke, but was perceived as racist at some level. They wrote on Facebook the next day that the case had now been settled and closed. In 2012, Wolde-Mariam was a mentor on the Norwegian version of The Voice, known as The Voice: Norges beste stemme, a TV program also broadcast on TV 2.

In 2015, Madcon released the song Don't Worry featuring Ray Dalton.

=== Films and television series featuring Madcon's interpolation of "Beggin'" ===
Madcon's interpolation of the song "Beggin'" was also used in the movies Step Up 3, Street Dance 3D, Just Go With It, and the theatrical trailer for Bad Teacher. It was sung by Philip Phillips on American Idol in 2012 and by Bill Downs and Max Milner in the battle rounds of The Voice UK series 1.

In 2021, Madcon appeared on the Norwegian television series Exit during the 7th episode of the second season, portraying a musical duo invited to play at an open-air party. They are heard performing, among other songs, their interpolation of "Beggin'".

== Musical styles ==
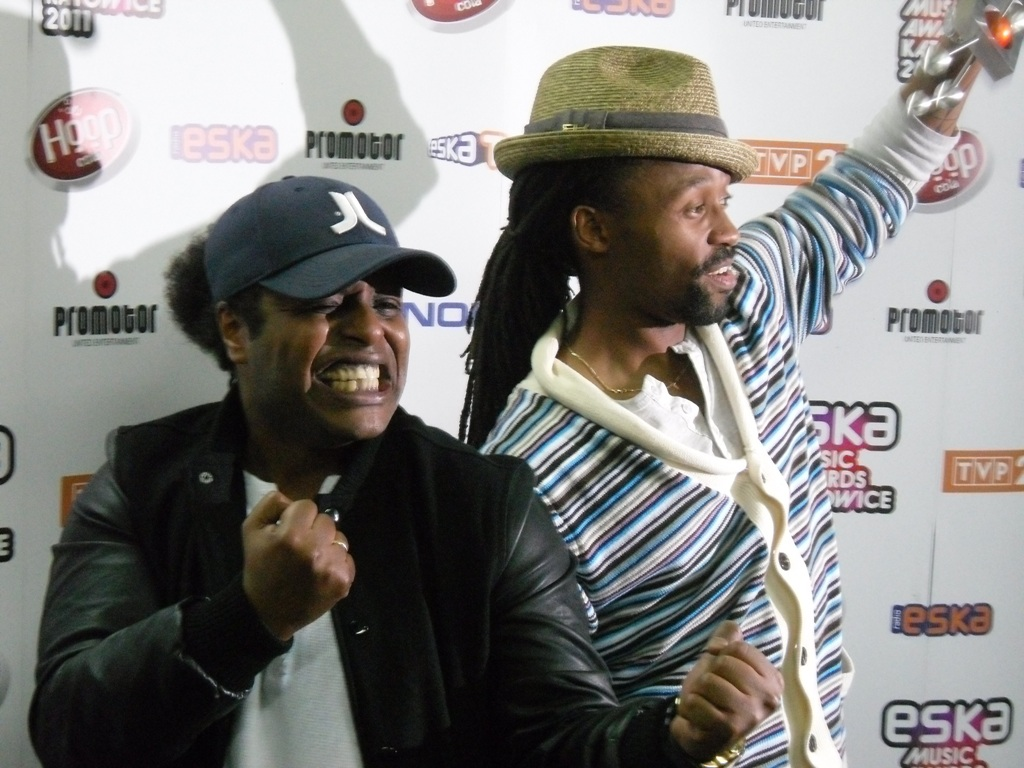
Madcon at Eska Music Awards 2011

Madcon describes their musical style as a retro-urban mix with influences from soul, funk, and hip hop, with additional elements from African, Latin, and reggae music.

== Discography ==
- It's All a Madcon (2004)
- So Dark the Con of Man (2007)
- An InCONvenient Truth (2008)
- Contraband (2010)
- Contakt (2012)
- Icon (2013)
- Contakt Vol. 2 (2018)

Preceded by Fuerzabruta	Eurovision Song Contest; Final interval act 2010	Succeeded by Jan Delay
