= Marco Filibeck =

Italian lighting designer (born 1957)

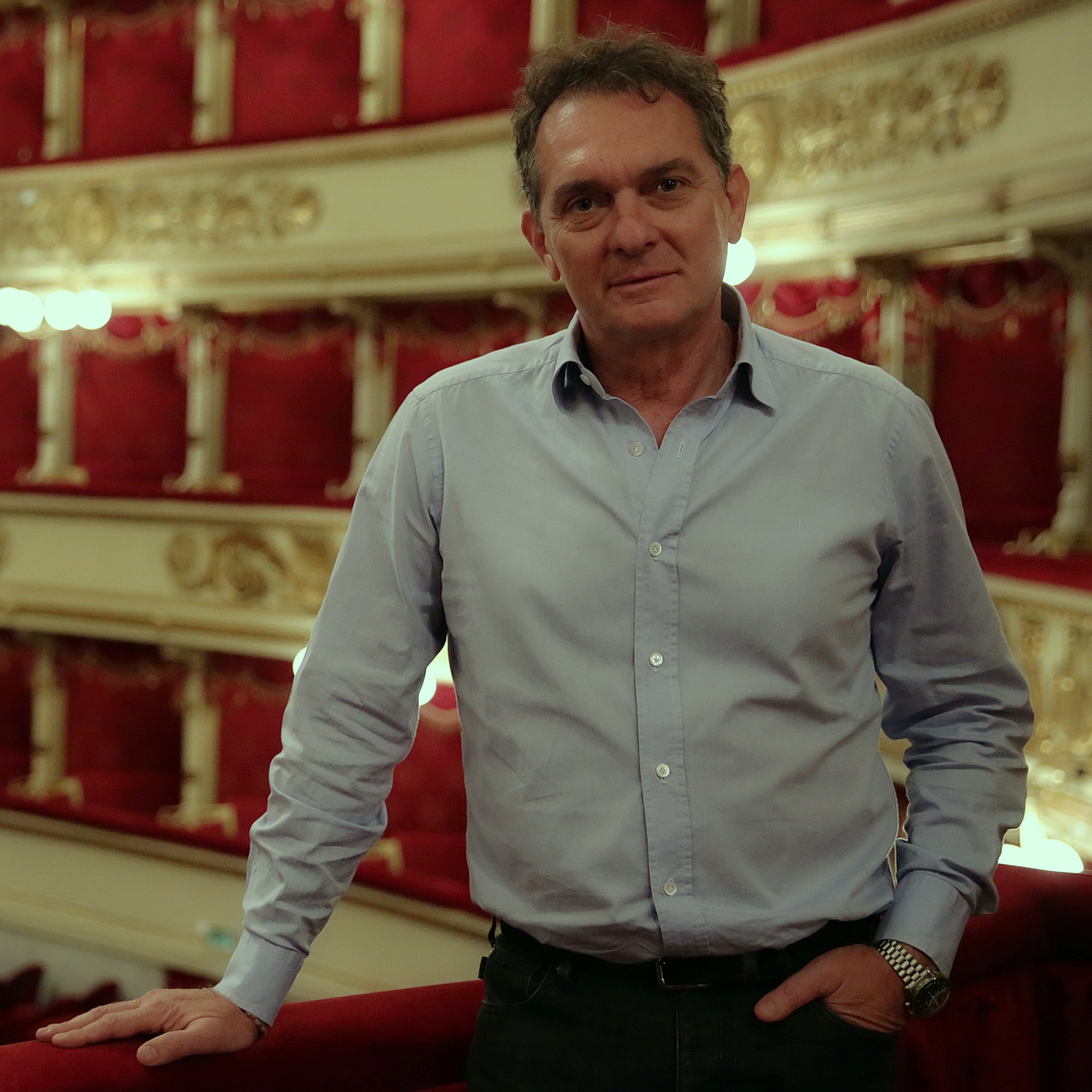
- Filibeck in 2017
- Born: May 11, 1957 (age 69); Rome
- Occupation: Lighting designer

Marco Filibeck (born May 11, 1957) is an Italian lighting designer.

== Biography ==
His father was the painter Gilberto Filibeck. Marco starts his career as lighting consolle operator, working on over two hundred live concert for Vasco Rossi between 1979 and 1984. He collaborates with different artists from the Italian music scene, like Enzo Jannacci ("Ci vuole orecchio" tour, 1981) and Loredana Bertè ("E la luna bussò" tour, 1980).

In 1983, Filibeck obtains a qualification as light technician at Bologna's Teatro Comunale. Two years later he's hired at Teatro alla Scala in Milan. From 1996, Filibeck is lighting designer at Teatro alla Scala and in 2009 he's appointed as Resident Lighting Designer and Lighting manager, working in this role until 2022.

During his career Filibeck has worked with the most important Italian and foreign directors, such as Franco Zeffirelli, Luca Ronconi, Liliana Cavani, Gabriele Salvatores, Àlex Ollé (La Fura dels Baus).

Marco Filibeck designed, starting from 2008, the lights for Roberto Bolle & Friends ballet, a recurring production hosted in the major Italian archeological sites and squares, like Colosseum in Rome, Valle dei Templi in Agrigento, piazza del Duomo in Milan, Arena di Verona and Piazza San Marco in Venice.

In 2018, he received the Franco Abbiati award for the light of the opera Hänsel und Gretel (directed by Sven-Eric Bechtolf).

In 2023, it is published Marco Filibeck - Lighting Designer (The Scenographer), a monography book about Filibeck's career.

In 2025, he won the LUCE Career Award issued by AIDI, the Italian Association for Lighting.

== Works ==
=== Opera ===
==== Teatro alla Scala ====
2009

- Il viaggio a Reims, by Luca Ronconi and Gae Aulenti
- Le convenienze e inconvenienze teatrali, by Antonio Albanese and Leila Fteita

2010

- L'occasione fa il ladro, by Jean Pierre Ponnelle
- Faust, by Eimuntas and Marius Nekrosius
- Simon Boccanegra, by Federico Tiezzi

2011

- La donna del lago, by Luis Pasqual and Ezio Frigerio
- Der Rosenkavalier, by Herbert Wernicke
- Attila, by Gabriele Lavia and Alessandro Camera
- Quartett, by Àlex Ollé - La Fura dels Baus

2012

- La bohème, by Franco Zeffirelli

2013

- Aida, by Franco Zeffirelli and Maurizio Millenotti
- Lo spazzacamino, di Lorenza Cantini e Angelo Sala
- Oberto, Conte di San Bonifacio, by Mario Martone and Sergio Tramonti

2014

- Il trovatore, by Hugo de Ana
- Così fan tutte, by Claus Guth

2015

- Wozzeck, by Jürgen Flimm

2016

- Rigoletto, by Gilbert Deflò and Ezio Frigerio

2017

- La gazza ladra, by Gabriele Salvatores
- La traviata, by Liliana Cavani, Dante Ferretti and Gabriella Pescucci
- Der Freischütz, by Matthias Hartmann and Raimund Voigt
- Hänsel und Gretel, by Sven-Eric Bechtolf and Julian Crouch
- Die Entführung aus dem Serail, GiorgioStrehler and Ezio Frigerio

2018

- Ernani, by Sven-Eric Bechtolf and Julian Crouch
- Alì Babà e i 40 ladroni, by Liliana Cavani and Leila Fteita

2019

- La cenerentola, by Jean-Pierre Ponnelle
- Ariadne auf Naxos, by Frederic Wake-Walker
- Prima la musica poi le parole, by Grischa Asagaroff and Luigi Perego

2020

- A riveder le stelle..., by Davide Livermore, Giò Forma, D-Wok

2021

- Così fan tutte, directed by Michael Hampe, Mauro Pagano
- L'italiana in Algeri, by Jean Pierre Ponnelle
- Le nozze di Figaro, by Giorgio Strehler and Ezio Frigerio

2022

- I Capuleti e i Montecchi, by Adrian Noble e Tobias Hoheisel
- Un ballo in maschera by Marco Arturo Marelli

2023

- L'amore dei tre re, by Àlex Ollé

2024

- La rondine, by Irina Brook

2025

- Falstaff, by Giorgio Strehler (revival director Marina Bianchi)

==== Other opera productions ====
1998

- Carillon, by Giorgio Marini and Lauro Crisman (Teatro Strehler, Milan)
- Il re pastore, by Mietta Corli (Teatro Giovanni da Udine, Udine)
- Il furioso all'isola di San Domingo, by Micha Van Hoecke and Gheorghe Iancu (Teatro Donizetti, Bergamo; Teatro Strehler, Milan)

1999

- Madama Butterfly, by Mietta Corli (Cortile della Pilotta, Parma; Castello Sforzesco, Milano; Teatro Sào Carlos, Lisbon)

2000

- Otello, by Mietta Corli (Villa Pallavicino, Busseto)
- La traviata, by Mietta Corli (Villa Pallavicino, Busseto)
- La bohème, by Mietta Corli and Marina Bianchi (Teatro San Carlo, Naples)

2001

- Il trovatore, by Mietta Corli (Castello di Vigoleno, Piacenza)

2002

- Oberto, Conte di San Bonifacio, by Pier'Alli (Teatro degli Arcimboldi, Milan)
- Tosca, by Mietta Corli (Castello di Vigoleno, Piacenza)
- Le nozze di Figaro, by Mietta Corli (Teatro Coliseu, Porto)

2003

- Passage, by Micha Van Hoecke and Luciana Savignano (Teatro Strehler, Milan)
- Ugo, Conte di Parigi, by Guido de Monticelli and Angelo Sala (Teatro Donizetti, Bergamo; Teatro degli Arcimboldi, Milan; Teatro Bellini, Catania)
- Carmina Burana, by Mietta Corli (Teatro Coliseu, Porto; Castello di Vigoleno, Piacenza)
- Vita, by Giorgio Gallione (Teatro Studio, Milan)

2004

- L'arlesiana, by Mietta Corli (Teatro Rendano, Cosenza)
- La traviata, by Marco Gandini and Italo Grassi (Teatro Grande, Brescia; Teatro Carlo Felice, Genoa)
- Cavalleria rusticana - La vida breve, by Marco Gandini and Italo Grassi (Teatro Carlo Goldoni, Livorno)

2005

- L'italiana in Algeri, by Marco Gandini and Lucia Goj (Teatro Comunale, Treviso)
- Il flauto magico, by Mietta Corli (Teatro Coliseu, Porto)
- Carmen, by Amedeo Amodio and Luisa Spinatelli (Teatro degli Arcimboldi, Milan)
- La finta semplice, by Marco Gandini (Teatro Malibran, Venice)

2006

- Pagliacci, by Marco Gandini and Italo Grassi (Teatro Verdi, Sassari)
- Così fan tutte, by Marco Gandini and Italo Grassi (Teatro Municipale, Piacenza)
- Il flauto magico, by Marco Gandini and Lucia Goj (Teatro Olimpico, Vicenza)

2007

- Un ballo in maschera, by Marco Gandini and Italo Grassi (Teatro del Maggio musicale, Florence)
- Il pirata, by Pier'Alli (Teatro delle Muse, Ancona)

2008

- Aida '62, by Franco Zeffirelli (Teatro Massimo, Palermo)

2009

- Il mondo alla rovescia, by Marco Gandini and Carlo Centolavigna (Teatro Salieri, Legnago; Teatro Filarmonico, Verona)
- La bohème, by Franco Zeffirelli and Piero Tosi (New Israeli Opera, Tel Aviv)

2010

- Madama Butterfly, by Damiano Michieletto (Teatro Regio, Turin)
- Betulia liberata, by Marco Gandini and Italo Grassi (Haus fur Mozart, Salisburgo; Teatro Dante Alighieri, Ravenna)

2011

- Simon Boccanegra, by Marco Gandini and Italo Grassi (KNO, Seoul)

2012

- Il viaggio a Reims, by Marco Gandini and Italo Grassi (Teatro del Maggio musicale, Florence)

2013

- Fidelio, by Gary Hill (Opéra Lyon, Lyon)
- Il barbiere di Siviglia, by Leo Iizuka and Italo Grassi (Art Performing Center, Kobe)
- Il prigioniero - Erwartung, by Àlex Ollé and Alfons Flores - La Fura dels Baus (Opéra Lyon, Lyon)

2015

- I puritani, by Fabio Ceresa and Tiziano Santi (Teatro del Maggio musicale, Florence)
- Pelleas et Melisande by Alex Ollè ( La fura dels baus) and Alfons Flores (Semperoper Dresden)

2016

- Madama Butterfly, by Àlex Ollé - La Fura dels Baus (Terme di Caracalla, Rome)
- Norma, by Àlex Ollé and Alfons Flores - La Fura dels Baus (Royal Opera House, London)
- Le cid, by Guy Joosten and Alfons Flores - La Fura dels Baus (Festspiele, St. Gallen)

2017

- Alceste, by Àlex Ollé andAlfons Flores (Opéra Lyon, Lyon)
- Il ratto del serraglio, di Giorgio Strehler (Teatro San Carlo, Naples)
- Madama Butterfly, by Keita Asari (New Israeli Opera, Tel Aviv)

2019

- Turandot, by Franc Aleu and Carles Berga - La Fura dels Baus (Teatro Gran Liceu, Barcelona)

2021

- Carmen, by Alex Ollè (La fura dels baus) and Alfons Flores (New National Theatre, Tokyo)

2022

- La Boheme by Dante Ferretti (Art Performing Center Kobe, Japan)

2023

- Tosca, by Franco Zeffirelli (revival director Marco Gandini) (Kanagawa Kemmin Hall, Yokohama)

2024

- Don Pasquale, by Lorenzo Mariani (Teatro dei Rinnovati, Siena)
- Macbeth, by Pierre Audi (Verdi Festival, Parma)
- La battaglia di Legnano, by Valentina Carrasco (Verdi Festival, Parma)
- Madama Butterfly, by Lorenzo Mariani (Teatro del Maggio Musicale Fiorentino, Florence)
- Lucia di Lammermoor, by Lorenzo Mariani (Teatro Carlo Felice, Genoa)

2025

- Lucrezia Borgia, by Valentina Carrasco (Teatro dell'Opera, Rome)
- La resurrezione, by Ilaria Lanzino (Caracalla Festival, Rome)

2026

- La cecchina, by Daniele Luchetti (Teatro Petruzzelli, Bari)

=== Ballet ===
==== Teatro alla Scala ====
2000

- Ondine, by Frederick Ashton

2005

- La sylphide, by Pier Lacotte and Aureliè Dupont

2006

- Vanitas, by Fabrizio Monteverde

2010

- Romeo e Giulietta, by Kenneth MacMillan and Mauro Carosi

2011

- Raymonda, by Marius Petipa
- L'altro Casanova, by Gianluca Schiavoni and Aurelio Colombo

2012

- L'altra metà del cielo, by Martha Clarke and Vasco Rossi

2014

- Don Chisciotte, by Rudolf Nureyev and Raffaele del Savio

2015

- Excelsior, by Ugo Dell'Ara and Filippo Crivelli

2016

- Il giardino degli amanti, by Roberto Bolle, Massimiliano Volpini and Erika Carretta

2018

- Lo schiaccianoci, by George Balanchine and Margherita Palli
- Le Corsaire, by Anna-Marie Holmes e Maria Luisa Spinatelli
- Bolero, di Maurice Bèjart

2019

- La bella addormentata nel bosco, by Rudolf Nureyev (revival choreographer Florence Clerc)

2023

- Coppelia, by Alexei Ratmansky

2024

- La Bayadère, by Rudolf Nureyev e Maria Luisa Spinatelli

==== Other ballet productions ====
2007

- Il mare in catene, by Francesco Ventriglia (Biennale danza, Venice; Teatro Strehler, Milan)

2008

- Roberto Bolle & Friends (Colosseum, Rome; Piazza del Plebiscito, Naples; Piazza del Duomo, Milan; Valle dei Templi, Agrigento, Piazza San Marco, Venice)

2010

- Don Chisciotte, by Vladimir Derevianko and Roberta Guidi di Bagno (Teatro del Maggio musicale, Florence)

2011

- Lo schiaccianoci, by Aaron Watkin and Roberta Guidi di Bagno (Semperoper, Dresden)
- Coppélia, by George Balanchine and Roberta Guidi di Bagno (Semperoper, Dresden)

2016

- Don Chisciotte, by Aaron Witkins and Patrick Kinmonth (Semperoper, Dresden)

2018

- Don Chisciotte, by Victor Ullate and Roberta Guidi di Bagno (Staatsballet, Berlin)

=== Teather ===
2014

- La famiglia Addams, by Giorgio Gallione, Guido Fiorato and Stefano Benni (Teatro della Luna, Milan)

2024

- Oliva Denaro, by Giorgio Gallione (Teatro Giuditta Pasta, Saronno)

=== Fashion ===
2012 - 2019

- Haute couture shows for Dolce & Gabbana (Taormina; Ansaldo Laboratories, Teatro alla Scala, Palazzo Litta, Pinacoteca Ambrosiana, Milan)

== Awards ==
- 2018 - Premio Franco Abbiati - Hänsel und Gretel, directed by Sven-Eric Bechtolf
- 2025 - LUCE Career Award

== See also ==
- Teatro alla Scala
- La Fura dels Baus
