= Gian Christian =

Australian screenwriter

- Born: Melbourne, Australia
- Occupation: producer

Gian Christian is an Australian born producer.

Christian produced the Australian premier production of the Broadway musical The Addams Family which was nominated for a Helpmann Award.
