= Luca Francesconi =

Italian composer

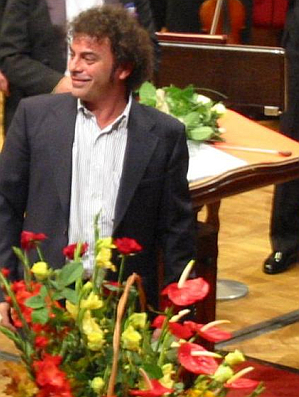
Francesconi in Warsaw

Luca Francesconi (born 17 March 1956) is an Italian composer. He studied at the Milan Conservatory, later with Karlheinz Stockhausen and then Luciano Berio.

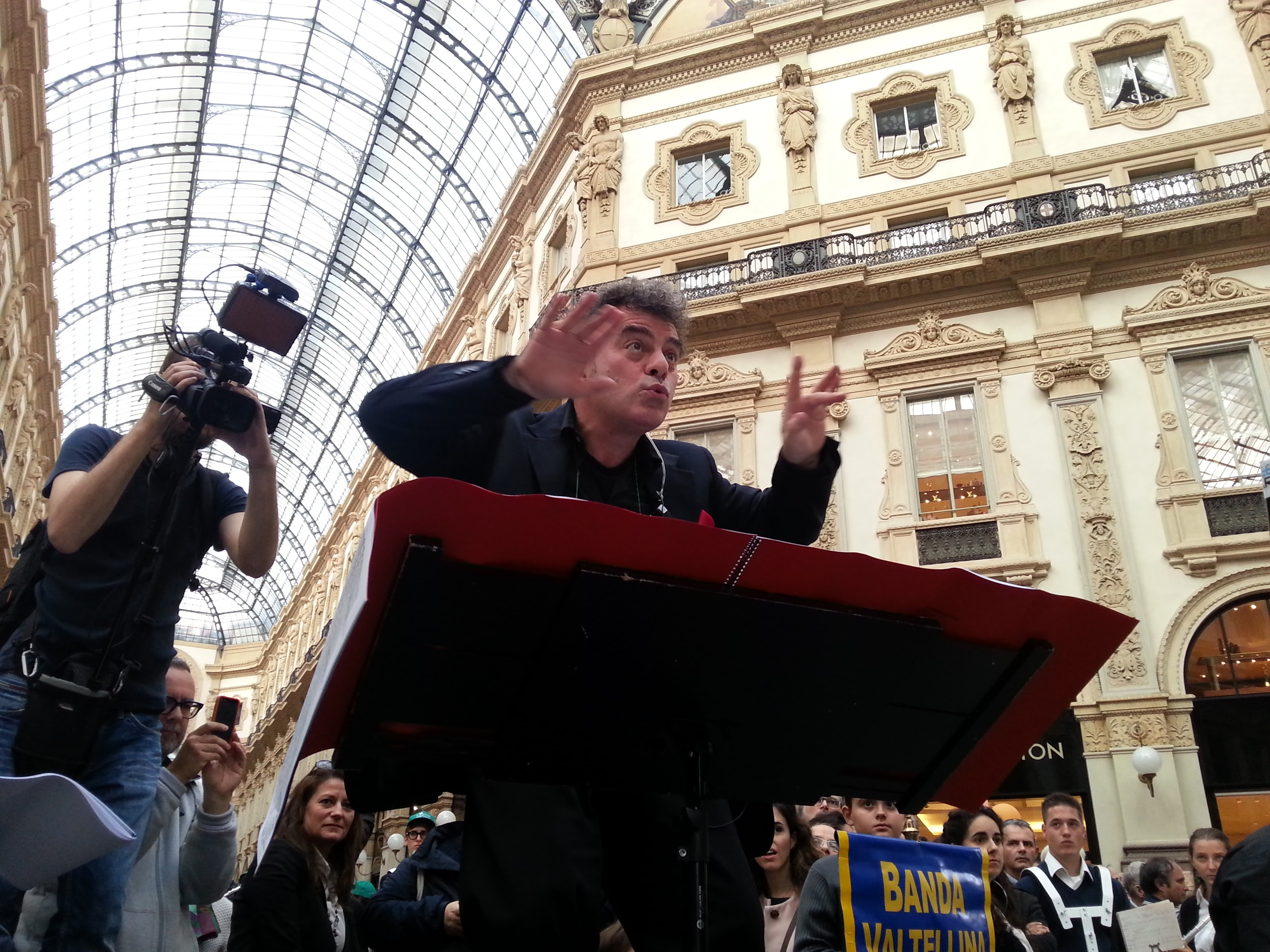
Luca Francesconi conducting Fresco, Galleria Vittorio Emanuele, Milan, October 2015

== Early years ==
Luca Francesconi was born in Milan. His father was a painter who edited Il Corriere dei piccoli and conceived Il Corriere dei ragazzi, while his mother was an advertiser. Francesconi spent his early years in QT8, a working-class quarter in Milan. At the age of five he began to learn the piano. Although he was accepted into the junior high school section of the city's conservatory six years later, he pulled out. Instead, Francesconi opted to attend the junior high school in QT8.

== Education ==
Francesconi returned to the Conservatory of Milan in 1974, while he was still attending the Berchet Classical Languages High School, and explored the musical landscape, taking an interest in different sounds. He played in jazz and rock groups as well as in classical concerts. Francesconi worked as a session man in recording studios, and composed music for theatre, cinema, advertising, and television.

Francesconi attended the Milan Conservatory and enrolled in the composition course conducted by Azio Corghi. "From him I learnt the trade, the fundamentals, counterpoint and those things, professional seriousness and open-mindedness." In the meantime he continued to explore electronic music and in 1977 took time out to immerse himself in jazz at the Berklee College of Music in Boston.

=== A student of Karlheinz Stockhausen ===
Donnerstag aus Licht went on stage at the Teatro alla Scala in Milan in 1981. Stockhausen is a historical reference point: Francesconi admired him for his organisational consistency and his search for linguistic unity. He was also impressed by this initial opera. He wanted to observe the composer at work, so he enrolled in the intensive course that Stockhausen held in Rome that same year. "From him I learnt rigor, at first imbibing it by osmosis, and then demythologising it."

=== Meeting and collaboration with Luciano Berio ===
Luciano didn't talk much about the more 'technical' and delicate aspects of his work as a composer. I remember that when he least expected it, I would fire questions at him point-blank, hoping to pick up some tips. His replies were like enigmas. They had something sacral about them and they required divining rituals to decode them.

With Berio, Francesconi studied in the field, acting as his assistant from 1981 to 1984. He worked directly on the score of La vera storia and participated in the production as rehearsal pianist and second conductor/substitute maestro. In 1984 he collaborated with the composer in the rewriting of Monteverdi's Orfeo. He was also present with Berio at Tanglewood where he attended one of his summer courses.

== Activities, works, research ==
In 1984 three of Francesconi's pieces, including Passacaglia, for large orchestra (1982), were selected for the Gaudeamus International Composers Award in Amsterdam. This first important recognition on the international scene created a useful tie with the Dutch music scene and laid the foundation for further commissions. Meanwhile, in Italy, thanks to a commission from the Teatro Lirico di Cagliari, Francesconi had the opportunity to seriously put into practice for the first time his idea of a "polyphony of languages": Suite 1984. The polyphony that I have in mind hasn't got anything to do with the "postmodern" or collage, the exotic pastiche, the provincial chinoiserie of our grandparents (but also of Stockhausen and certain pop groups). Instead, it is a free fusion of ideas in a compact and linguistically very solid body that reveals its profound energies in its inner profundity and not in an exterior heterogeneity. Energies that come from the earth, from popular culture, from ancient African and Oriental cultures. "In 1984 the Teatro Lirico in Cagliari presented a quartet made up of the pianist and composer Franco D'Andrea together with the group Africa Djolé led by the master percussionist Fode Youla from Guinea. The idea was then conceived that the music of this group be recreated in symphonic form (Suite 1984) by the 28-year-old Luca Francesconi for a performance by the theatre's orchestra under the direction of Francesconi himself, a recent product of rigorous musical studies, assistant to Luciano Berio and 'jazz student of D'Andrea', as he used to like to define himself. The concert attracted experts anxious to hear novelties and promising syncretisms of various musical civilisations, and it was a triumph." "Orchestra, African percussionists and jazz quintet: the choice of instrumental make-up itself contained in an explicit manner the generative nucleus of one of the principal aesthetic motors of the music of Luca Francesconi: the tendency to place alongside one another, following the rules of contrast and fusion, sounds and languages of highly diverse origins."

=== 1984–1990 ===
Francesconi's first record, an LP recorded in the United States, contained Viaggiatore insonne, on a text by Sandro Penna. "Francesconi's attitude as a composer is in fact similar to that of a tireless traveller, who explores linguistic spaces in search of their ever-shifting confines, and who conducts an etiological study to determine the confines between noise and sound, between instinct and reason." The new piece Vertige, for string orchestra, was performed in Strasbourg. Francesconi composed various works for ensemble which were performed in Cagliari (Onda sonante, for eight instruments, commissioned by the Nieuw Ensemble; conductor: Ed Spanjaard (1985)), Paris (Tracce, for flute (1986)), Città di Castello (Da capo, for nine instruments (1988)), Middelburg (Finta-di-nulla, for soprano and nineteen instruments on a text by Umberto Fiori; Xenakis Ensemble; conductor: Diego Masson; and soprano: Marie Duisit (1991)), and Brussels (Encore/Da capo, for 9 instruments; Ictus Ensemble, conducted by the composer (1995)). In 1984 Casa Ricordi became Francesconi's publisher and since then has published all his works. In 1985 he was invited to the Festival Musica ‘900 in Trent for a series of public conversations with Franco Donatoni. This meeting proved extremely important; talking with the great Verona composer, both in their public conversations and during train trips together, Francesconi felt that he reached a solution for a number of unresolved problems. Plot in fiction, dedicated to Franco Donatoni, was in many ways the happy outcome of this experience.

=== Plot in Fiction ===
The difficult thing is to write works with a rich and articulated complex of meanings and events: works, that is, that are capable of assuming a linguistic structure, but whose complexity is transparent.

Plot in Fiction, for oboe and cor anglais or clarinet and chamber group (1986), constructs its sonoric line around key notes within a rigorous formal framework. "The point here is to find the "plot" in the "fiction", the narrative line that twists and turns through the complexity and intricacy of a "mass of everyday symbols". What's involved is an architecture that guides the listener within the composition: the search for a compositional transparency (without, however, ever slipping into simplicity; the means employed leave unaltered the quality of the composer's thought), based on pure energy, directly perceptible, without any need to exhibit the mechanisms underlying it. The piece was performed for the first time at the Festival Musica '900 in Trent by Ensemble Musique Oblique under the direction of Sandro Gorli; the soloist was Diego Dini Ciacci.

=== Mambo ===
At this point I would say that it is no longer possible to talk of a language devoid of code or morphogenesis, i.e. of a language that comes into being while the aesthetic event is being produced. It's necessary to also come to terms with a substratum, with what I call semantic pressure, that is with history.

Mambo, for solo piano, is Francesconi's most jazz-like piece, and it reveals clearly his search for an ever-uneasy equilibrium between sonoric materials, gathered in their primitive state, and the evocative power of history, from which the composer cannot remove himself. In the piece there is an overlap of a rhythmic ostinato in a low register, a series of ascending-descending diatonic lines, and, finally, a sequence of pounding 4-note chords. In this continual 'friction of contraries' resides the aesthetic motor of Francesconi's music as well as the powerful charge of sonoric seduction that his works carry. Francesconi exploits as a precious resource the capacity for intense analysis developed in Western culture. He takes a shared musical reference and dissects it remorselessly until he lays bare further possibilities of development, of transformation. Wielding its 'semantic pressure' as though it were a picklock, he presses further and further inwards, towards the energy-bearing roots of sound.

=== AGON, centre for music research and experimentation ===
In 1990 Francesconi founded AGON with two great utopian visions in mind. The first was that it is still possible and desperately important to work together, cooperatively, imagining projects to realise together with others, to exchange experiences, ideas. AGON came into being as an organism with a public identity: "it is not my or your studio"; it aspires to be a place where it's possible to talk, meet, and not just pursue one's own interest. The second utopian idea was to start from below and not from high-tech; to depart from the musical needs of composers with a view to stimulating a different relationship, simpler, "less terroristic", between real musicians and machines. Handling electronics also serves, according to Francesconi, to recuperate a physical, auditive approach to musical composition, which, if limited to paper and pencil, runs the risk of becoming too speculative, weakening the direct relationship with the sonoric material. AGON has for many years been one of the most active centres in Italy for music research and production.

=== Riti neurali ===
Complexity is always a question of quality, not quantity. What really matters is transparency in an overall density. This means that I should only make use of a particularly articulated syntax if I really need to, or, in other words, only if I've got particularly articulated things to say.

Composed in 1991, for violin and eight instruments, Riti neurali is Francesconi's third study on memory. Like many of his works, it develops the material on multiple levels, pursuing labyrinthine paths. Nonetheless, its clearly delineated textures offer the listener unmistakable points of reference. The soloist establishes a vast array of relations with the small orchestra (guiding it, allowing himself to be guided, contradicting it, ignoring it, etc.), at the same time assuming various positions himself ... The complexity of the counterpoint arises out of the simultaneity of the various positions. "There are things that evoke other things, or that acquire meaning in relation to other things. We are subjected, in a certain sense, to a historically determined perceptive destiny. Whether we want to be or not. The illusion of the tabula rasa, of pure transparency, is not enough. Probably it's better to take account of this perceptive problem right from the start and to consider it one of the compositional parameters." The work was commissioned by Radio France and the world premiere took place in Paris on 14 January 1992: Asko Ensemble; conductor: Denis Cohen, and soloist: Irvine Arditti. While a series of performances followed on from one another in Amsterdam, Paris, Brussels, and Antwerp, an extensive portrait at the Venice Biennale, in 1993, definitively consolidated Francescon's reputation in Italy as well: the Nieuw Ensemble Amsterdam, Arditti and Ensemble Modern (with the newly commissioned Plot II) joined forces in a single concert dedicated to the composer's music at the Teatro La Fenice.

=== Etymo ===
Between 1993 and 1994 Francesconi worked and taught in Paris in the hyper-technological workshop Ircam, where "you model sound with your hands". On commission from Ircam, he carried out computer analysis on sounds and their behaviour right down to their roots, their etymon, to realise "one of the most convincing and at the same time impetuous musical equivalents of the writing of Baudelaire, striving with clarity of mind to achieve a secure control over the insidious relationship between words and music." The piece is based almost entirely on Baudelaire's poem Le Voyage, of which at two points we hear the soprano declaim two key fragments: "Dites, qu'avez-vous vu?" (Speak, what have you seen?). The computer analysis of this question constitutes the DNA that structures the entire piece, from the microstructure to the macroform. The result is a multi-levelled organism that in 25 minutes lays out its basic material (phonemes, instrumental particles, electronic transformation) and then proceeds to join it all together in increasingly complex structures. Everything begins with a question on the origin of meaning (in Greek: "etymon"). What is there before the word, and what models language? And finally, what allows us to transcend language? In the beginning there is pre-language, its premises. Etymo, a work furnished with huge white wings, starts out with the primordial mumblings of language, in phonemes. Nothing is intelligible, alliterations that roll off and slip away (or fluctuate) and an orchestra that appears suspended, as if it were waiting. These phonetic and musical particles aggregate in a contrapuntal overlapping which in the end explodes in an ocean of profundity from which the first words arise. An important example of how Francesconi employs electronics in a masterly way to broaden the expressive range and colour of instruments. The physicality of the performance remains at the centre of the work, but the electronics helps it to reach an extreme expressive intensity. A fuoco (1995) is Francesconi's fourth study on memory; Animus, for trombone and computer (1996), was performed in Paris, while the London Sinfonietta took Plot in fiction to Santa Cecilia in Rome (1996).

=== Wanderer ===
On 17 January 2000 Riccardo Muti conducted Wanderer at the Scala in Milan.

=== Cobalt, Scarlet: Two Colours of Dawn ===
Music is closer than any other form of expression to that nucleus of "existential energy" that lives deep within us. 2000 was also the year of Cobalt, Scarlet: Two Colors of Dawn. "A single movement of twenty-three minutes for large orchestra divided into parallel – at times counterpoised – groups begins with a pianissimo of metallic gleams that emanate alternately from the two sides of the stage. Then, other percussion instruments, wind instruments and brass instruments, join in in a subdued manner, developing, transforming planes of volume and colour. But it is an unexpected metallic accent exploding like a burst of profundity that fills the auditorium not so much with clamour as with presence, rapture." "With this composition Luca Francesconi reached a turning point in his career, enriching his exploration into the heart of sonoric material with greater sensibility and emotivity. In this way his music acceded to a broader artistic dimension, that of a harmonious encounter of technique and psychology in the broadest sense of the term.

== Music theatre ==
From 1985 to the present Luca Francesconi has composed eight works of a theatrical stamp, from Scene, on a text by Umberto Fiori, to the chamber opera In Ostaggio, from Lips, Eyes Bang, for actress/singer, twelve instruments and live audio/video, to the video-opera Striaz. Ballata, commissioned by the Théâtre de La Monnaie in Brussels/di Bruxelles and with stage direction by Achim Freyer, was staged in 2002.

=== Ballata ===
My idea was to turn over a new leaf, to free myself so to speak from the 20th century. I wanted to use all the expressive densities that that century conceded to me, and for me it was a kind of synthesis of the musical experiences that had struck me most.

In 1994 Luca Francesconi had realised an opera for radio (and eventual winner of the Prix Italia), Ballata del rovescio del mondo, on a text by Umberto Fiori; in 1996 his continuing, close collaboration with the Milan poet resulted in his third work for music theatre, Ballata, drawn from Samuel Coleridge's The Rime of the Ancient Mariner. Divided into two acts, Ballata makes use of a large orchestra with an enlarged percussion section; on the right of the stage is an instrumental ensemble inspired by Gypsy orchestras, while four female choirs distributed at the four angles of the auditorium "function as walls that open and close towards the irrational, memory, towards flashbacks". Electronic sounds elaborated at Ircam contribute to the spatial disorientation. Originally, for the role of the ancient mariner, Francesconi had thought of Sting, with whom he had recorded the first song of the opera Day After Day. In the end, however, the collaboration did not eventuate for reasons of language (Sting did not feel up to singing and acting in Italian), but the idea remained of a present-day narrator who, like the ancient mariner, is condemned to wander around the globe in search of someone to whom to recount his incredible adventures, from shipwreck to the glaciers of the South Pole, from the scorching sun of the equator to the appearance of monsters and a phantomatic sailing ship. The temporal plane is split: on stage the ancient mariner tells his story and at the same time he appears as a young man in the midst of a storm. Various compositional techniques follow on from one another, from early expressionism onwards, integrated with other traditions, like folk music. "Luca Francesconi develops an orchestral writing that is inventive, sensual and seductive all at the same time, deftly integrating electronic resources elaborated by Ircam. But, much more, he makes masterful use of an armoury of ardent vocality that is seasoned but anything but worn-out – from Brecht's spoken song to Monteverdi's madrigal, passing from the songs of English Baroque opera to all the immortals of Italian lyric opera, from Verdi to Berio, of whom he was a student."

=== Buffa opera ===
Who said that music today necessarily has to create angst? It's enough to think that Albanese used to come running onto the stage pursued by a cigarette two and half metres tall.

Buffa opera, a piece inspired by opera buffa on a text by Stefano Benni, went on stage at the Piccolo Teatro di Milano in 2002. It featured Antonio Albanese on stage for the whole opera as actor/singer alongside the chorus and the Buffa orchestra, a fully-fledged character, conducted by the composer himself. In it, the world was seen from the perspective of insects and spiders; Benni's libretto used surrealistic metaphors. Francesconi, who had been known for more dramatic or tragic work, composed music that employed a wide variety of styles, including jazz, avant-garde, and canzonetta, in a parodic manner. Buffa opera was later revived at the Teatro Morlacchi in Perugia.

Commissioned by the Holland Festival, Gesualdo Considered as a Murderer, on a libretto by Vittorio Sermonti, was performed for the first time in Amsterdam in June 2004. It was directed by Giorgio Barberio Corsetti, with Davide Damiani as Gesualdo, Eberhard Franscesco Lorenz as his Iago-like servant, and Alda Caiello as Gesualdo's wife's maid, and was well-received as a mature dramatic piece.

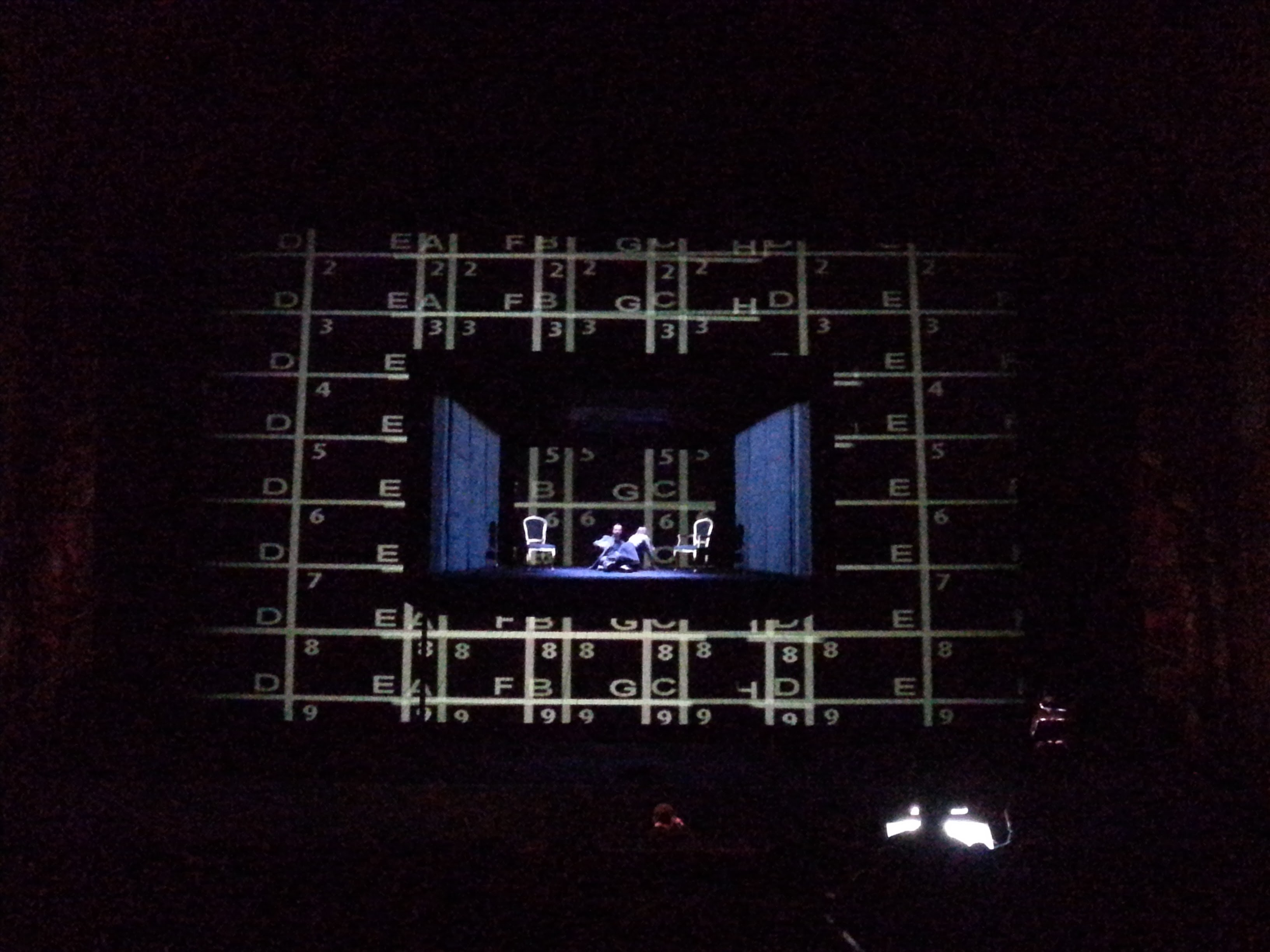
Quartett in Buenos Aires, Colón Theater, June 2015

=== Quartett ===
In 2011, Francesconi's eighth music theatre work, Quartett, premiered at the Scala in Milan. An adaptation of a text by Heiner Müller drawn in its turn from Pierre Choderlos de Laclos's 1782 novel Les liaisons dangereuses, it was jointly commissioned by Teatro alla Scala, Wiener Festwochen and Ircam. The libretto, by the composer, is in English, a language whose syncretism Francesconi felt aligned with his taste in musical syncretism. The composer and reviewers described it as a cynical and violent work, whose only two characters are a man and a woman, with some sort of past together, in a room.

The opera has a single act, thirteen scenes, and lasts a total of an hour and twenty minutes. Only two characters on stage, a small orchestra in the orchestra pit, a large orchestra and choir off-stage (available as a recording effected at the Scala in Milan), and electronics (Studio Ircam, Serge Lemouton: live and pre-recorded sounds). The stage direction at the Scala was entrusted to Alex Olle of La Fura dels Baus, who concentrated the action in a huge box suspended twelve metres above the stage, projecting onto the full breadth of the backdrop videos representing the outside world. Allison Cook, mezzo-soprano, interpreted the Marquise de Merteuil, alternating with Sinead Mulhern; Robin Adams, baritone, was Vicomte de Valmont. The conductor was Susanna Mälkki. This production was revived in 2012 in Vienna (Wiener FestWochen: conductor: Peter Rundel), in 2013 at the Nederlandse Opera in Amsterdam (the opening of the Holland Festival; conductor: Susanna Mälkki) and at the Opera di Lille (Ensemble Ictus: conductor: Georges-Elie Octors), and in 2014 in Lisbon (Gulbenkian Foundation: conductor: Susanna Mälkki).

Quartett was performed in concert form at the Cité de la Musique in Paris by Ensemble Intercontemporain (March 2013). A first new production was staged in Porto and Strasburg, once again with Allison Cook and Robin Adams, and with Remix Ensemble under the direction of Brad Lubman. The stage direction, scenery and costumes were by Nuno Carinhas and the lighting by Nuno Meira (Casa da Musica in Porto on 24 September 2013 and Festival Musica in Strasburg on 28 September 2013).

The opera was produced again in London by the Royal Opera House in a coproduction with the Opéra di Rouen and the London Sinfonietta, from 18 to 28 June 2014, with stage direction by John Fulljames. Two casts alternated for the ten performances (Leigh Melrose and Kristin Chávez; and Mark Stone and Angelica Voje) on the metallic structures of a post-atomic bunker realised by Soutra Gilmour, with lighting by Bruno Poet and videos by Ravi Deepres projected onto tattered screens dropped from above in the restrained atmosphere of the Linbury Studio. Under the structures warm and dim lights lit up the London Sinfonietta, conducted by Andrew Gourlay.

In 2015 the Malmö Opera presented a fourth production. It was directed by Stefan Johansson, with scenery by Jan Lundberg. Kirstin Chavez interpreted the Marquise de Merteuil and Christian Miedl Vicomte de Valmont; the conductor was Ralf Kircher.

The La Fura del Baus production was performed again in Buenos Aires, Colón Theater, in June 2015, with Allison Cook and Robin Adams, director Alex Olle, conductor Brad Lubman. "The press wasn't indifferent at all: "La Fura dels Baus strikes in America as well" (El País); "A high voltage opera" (Clarín); "To the limits of the opera" (La Nación); "Portrait of a crippled bourgeoisie" (Página 12). "Quartett: a wonderful and yet very demanding opera" (Ámbito Financiero).

== The Venice Biennale ==
From 2008 to 2011 Francesconi was the artistic director of the Venice Music Biennale. His imprint was immediately recognisable in the themes of the four festivals ("Roots/Future", "The body of sound", "Don Giovanni and the man of stone" and "Mutants") and it broadened out further in the conception of the festival as the ideal place "to seek new and different forms of perception and attention." Beyond the confines of concert halls and theatres, listeners freely choose how to approach the music, which was disseminated through the city as though on a stage in movement, accessible and without limits. This was the basic idea behind Exit, the celebratory evening/night that brought each of the four festivals to a close, transforming the Teatro alle Tese into a distended human body (Exit 02), "an experience with variable geometry, a new way of living space, sound and time from sunset to dawn", or inviting the public to take a boat towards the Island of San Michele to pay homage to Stravinsky in the form of three clarinet pieces at his tomb and to then participate in a banquet that evoked the finale of Don Giovanni. Don Giovanni was also at the heart of one of the most famous experiments in this four-year period: "Palazzo Pisani, home of the B. Marcello Conservatory, is the site chosen for the staging of Don Giovanni a Venezia, conceived by Francesconi himself. For this initiative, which has been defined as an opera-labyrinth, the public is asked not just to exercise its sensibility but also its intelligence, so as to try to create a kind of gap between space and time in which music can be inserted. After scrapping the old structure of the concert, Francesconi borrows three key scenes from Mozart's original – the duel between Don Giovanni and the Commendatore, the seduction of Zerlina and the death of Don Giovanni – and puts them on stage cyclically, in three different locations within the ancient Venetian palace, inserting in the loggie, palace rooms and courtyards another eight original pieces commissioned from contemporary composers. The spectator, as if he were to enter into a huge gallery and to decide autonomously how and what to look at, will have before his eyes a plurality of musical, scenic, theatrical and visual events to combine, putting aside the perceptive habits of space and time."

== Teaching ==
Luca Francesconi has taught for twenty-five years in Italy's conservatories and at the University of Ohio, in Rotterdam and in Strasburg. He has held master classes throughout Europe and the world, from Japan to the United States, from China to Canada. Until 2019 he has taught composition at the Malmö Academy of Music (part of Lund University), where he directed the composition department.

== Other collaborations ==
2000 marked two other important experiences. The Piccolo Teatro in Milan commissioned him to write the music for Calderón de la Barca's pièce La vida es sueño, with stage direction by Luca Ronconi, who in that very year took over the direction of the theatre from Giorgio Strehler. He wrote the music for Paolo Rosa's film Il mnemonista, produced by Studio Azzurro.

== 2014 ==
Two important international symphonic commissions mark the year.

=== Duende. The Dark Notes ===
An exploration of dark notes, an important element in perhaps the most history-laden instrument of the West.

Written for the extraordinary soloist Leila Josefowicz, this concerto for violin and orchestra was jointly commissioned by SR Swedish Radio and the BBC Proms. Performed in Stockholm in February 2014, in Turin in May 2014 and in June 2015 for the BBC Proms. «It was well worth the wait. As the title suggests, Francesconi's concerto takes the idea of the Duende, the dark, demonic spirit of flamenco, as its starting point, but the music never seems simplistically pictorial or programmatic. Instead, with the violin as protagonist, the five movements (the last two merged seamlessly together) evoke a threatening world of extremes, of heightened emotions and dramatically contrasted colours and registers. The orchestra weaves febrile webs around solo writing whose cracked arpeggios and steep scales manage to be more or less traditionally virtuosic within musical contexts that are anything but conventional, especially in the ferocious cadenza at the heart of the final movement. Josefowicz's playing was immensely committed and astoundingly vivid, and it emerged in even sharper, more subtle focus in the Radio 3 recording, which also resolved many of the textures that had seemed rather blurred in the hall.»

Duende was ranked number 6 in the Guardian's list of the top 10 classical concerts and operas of 2015

=== Dentro non ha tempo ===
"Curious, that title, 'Dentro non ha tempo'. It can be read in three ways: as the temporal suspension that someone who dies leaves in those that have loved him/her. As a reference to the great musical tradition from which Luciana came, the Abbado family: a homage to the past that has no time. Finally, an allusion to the form of the composition, based on three bars of Mozart's Don Giovanni dilated 29 times. Like the year of Luciana's birth, 1929.

Commissioned by the Teatro alla Scala for the Strauss cycle, Dentro non ha tempo, for large orchestra, is dedicated to Luciana Abbado Pestalozza, Francesconi's deceased friend who, with her sensibility and organisational capacity, played a crucial role in the development of contemporary music in Italy. The piece was performed at the Scala on 14 June 2014 under the direction of Esa-Pekka Salonen.

== 2015 ==
=== Vertical Invader ===
Vertical Invader, concerto grosso for reed quintet and orchestra. On 23 May world premiere in Amsterdam, Concertgebouw, Calefax Reed Quintet: Oliver Boekhoorn (oboe), Ivar Berix (clarinet), Raaf Hekkema (saxophone), Jelte Althuis (bass clarinet) and Alban Wesly (bassoon). Radio Filharmonisch Orkest, conductor Osmo Vänskä. The 'vertical invader' to which the title refers is a metaphor for a connection that is true and profoundly desired – as opposed to the false relationships presented by mass media – a synchronicity that in music is as perennially elusive as it is in the world.

=== Macchine in echo ===
On 2 October, the WDR Sinfonieorchester Cologne performed the world premiere of Luca Francesconi's Macchine in Echo at the Philharmonie in Cologne under the direction of Peter Rundel in collaboration with the piano duo GrauSchumacher. The piece was commissioned by the WDR, the Strasbourg MUSICA festival, and Wiener Konzerthaus. (The Strasbourg MUSICA festival presented the French premiere on 3 October at the closing concert of the festival's 33rd edition.) "When two pianos are involved, we can imagine them as two, frighteningly powerful, fiendish machines. With this piece, in addition to the two pianos, there's also a symphonic orchestra: I love the play of mirrors and the spell-binding multiplications of two pianos in unison with an orchestra. It's an infinite source of meanings: meanings that I need to find, in spite of the destructuration of reality all around us. In a small gesture towards this powerful resistance, I have incorporated a brief homage to Luciano Berio's Concerto for Two Pianos, one of the pieces that have left a profound mark on my life."

=== Bread, water and salt ===
On 3 October at the Auditorium Parco della Musica in Rome, Sir Antonio Pappano together with the soprano Pumeza Matshikiza and the Orchestra and Choir of the Accademia di Santa Cecilia, performed the world premiere of Bread, Water and Salt on texts by Nelson Mandela. This piece by Francesconi has been chosen to inaugurate the Orchestra di Santa Cecilia's 2015–16 concert season and will be dedicated by the orchestra to Ludwig van Beethoven. Francesconi says: "This piece was planned together with the 9th Symphony by Ludwig van Beethoven, in order to create a link between the brotherhood idea of Beethoven and Schiller and what it may mean today. We've chosen Mandela because of his simple adherence to the spirituality of the body, of the bread, of the sofference that can be defeated. Of the goodness, that may seem a worn out common place to us, but for the people who have nothing left, not even dignity, it is the part of the human being that may save them, that may save us. It may defeat the cold cynicism that perverts our relationships. So here comes the brotherhood: all these words, despised in politics and in the media, may really lead us to happiness".

== Works, editions and recordings ==
- I Quartetto for strings, 1977
- Passacaglia for great orchestra, 1982
- Concertante for guitar and ensemble, Tanglewood 1982
- Viaggiatore insonne for soprano and 5 instruments (text by Sandro Penna), 1983
- Notte for mezzo-soprano and 19 instruments (text by Sandro Penna), 1983–1984
- Suite 1984 for orchestra, African percussionists and jazz quintet with the Orchestra of the Ente Lirico di Cagliari, the Franco D'Andrea's band and Africa Djolé from Ivory Coast, directed by the composer, 1984
- Finta-di-nulla for soprano and 19 instruments (text by Umberto Fiori), 1985
- Onda sonante for 8 instruments, 1985
- Vertige for string orchestra, 1985
- Da capo for 9 instruments, 1985–1986
- Encore/Da capo for 9 instruments, 1985–1995
- Impulse II for clarinet, violin and piano, 1985, 1995
- Al di là dell'oceano famoso for 8 solo mixed voices, Netherland Radio Chamber Choir, 1985
- Secondo quartetto (Mondriaan Quartet)
- Tracce for flute, 1985–1987
- Plot in fiction for bassoon, English horn and 11 instruments, 1986
- Respiro for trombone solo, 1987
- Trama for saxophone and orchestra, 1987
- Mambo, for piano solo, 1987
- Attesa for reed quartet, 1988
- La voce, folk song for soprano and 13 instruments (text by Umberto Fiori), 1988
- Aeuia for baritone and 11 instruments (based on a text by di Jacopone da Todi), 1989
- Les barricades mystérieuses for flute and orchestra, 1989
- Piccola trama for saxophone and 8 instruments, 1989
- Richiami II – 1st study on memory, 1989–1992
- Memoria for orchestra, 1990
- Secondo Concerto for oboe and chamber orchestra, 1991
- Mittel for five moving bands, 1991
- Riti neurali, 3rd study on memory for violin and 8 instruments, 1991
- Islands concerto for piano and chamber orchestra, 1992
- Miniature for 16 instruments, 1992
- Voci for soprano, violin and magnetic tape (text by Umberto Fiori), 1992
- Aria for wind octet, 1993
- Plot II for saxophone and 15 instruments, 1993
- Risonanze d'Orfeo, suite for wind orchestra from Orfeo di Claudio Monteverdi, 1993
- Trama II for clarinet, orchestra and live electronics, 1993
- Terzo quartetto "Mirrors" for strings, Arditti Quartet, De Singel Antwerpen, 1994
- Ballata del rovescio del mondo, radio-opera on texts by Umberto Fiori, 1994
- Etymo for soprano, chamber orchestra and live electronics, from Charles Baudelaire, commission by IRCAM for soprano, Ensemble InterContemporain, conductor Pascal Rophé, soprano Luisa Castellani, Klangregie by the composer,1994
- A fuoco – 4th study on memory for guitar and ensemble, 1995
- Animus for trombone and live electronics, 1995–1996
- Inquieta limina. Un omaggio a Berio for ensemble with accordion, 1996
- Venti Radio-Lied, radiofilms, texts by Umberto Fiori, with Moni Ovadia and Phillis Blanford, 1996–1997
- Sirene/Gespenster, Heathen Oratorio for female choir in four cantorie, brasses, percussion and electronics, 1996–1997
- Striaz, video-opera for 4 female choirs and electronics, production Mittelfest/Video: Studio Azzurro, 1996
- Ballata, opera, 1996–1999, text by Umberto Fiori from The Rhyme of the Ancient Mariner by Samuel Taylor Coleridge, commission by Théâtre de la Monnaie di Bruxelles, conductor Kazushi Ono, stage director Achim Freyer, Young Mariner Anders Larsson, Ancient Mariner Marco Beasley, Life in Death Ildiko Komlosi and others
- Respondit, two madrigals by Carlo Gesualdo transcribed and revised per 5 instruments with an electronic spacing, 1997
- Lips, Eyes Bang, for actress/singer, 12 instruments, audio and video in real time, Amsterdam, Nieuw Ensemble, AGON, Studio Azzurro, STEIM, voice Phyllis Blandford, 1998.
- Memoria II for orchestra, 1998
- Wanderer for great orchestra, January 2000 Teatro alla Scala, Milan, conductor Riccardo Muti, Filarmonica della Scala
- Cobalt, Scarlet. Two Colours of Dawn for large orchestra, 1999–2000
- Terre del rimorso, (finished in 2001), commissioned by État francese for soli, coro and orchestra, for the Festival di Strasburgo, 6 October 2001, SWR Symphonie Orchester and Vokalensemble Stuttgart, conductor Péter Eötvös, 2000–2001
- Aria Novella, for double quartet, Paris, Ensemble Itinéraire, 2001
- Let me Bleed, Requiem for Carlo Giuliani for mixed choir a cappella commissioned by New London Chamber Choir, on texts by Attilio Bertolucci, 2001 New London Chamber Choir, James Wood (World Premiere Huddersfield Contemporary Music Festival 2001-12-02), Swedish Radio Choir, SWR Vokalensemble Stuttgart, RSO Stuttgart, Eötvös
- Buffa opera texts by Stefano Benni, singer and actor Antonio Albanese, 2002
- Controcanto, ensemble of 10 to 25 instruments, world premiere in Brussels, Palais des Beaux-Arts, Ensemble Ictus, conductor Georges-Elie Octors, 2003
- Cello concerto "Rest" Quartetto d'archi di Torino, Ensemble Intercontemporain, Orchestra Sinfonica Nazionale della RAI, Pierre Boulez, Roberto Abbado
- Gesualdo Considered as a Murderer, opera, libretto by Vittorio Sermonti, 2004
- Quarto Quartetto I voli di Niccolò, string quartet, commission by Paganiniana 2004, Genoa, to Cesare Mazzonis, Arditti Quartet, 2004
- Kubrick's Bone, for cimbalom and ensemble, 2005
- Accordo reed quintet, Calefax, 2005
- Body Electric, for violino, guitar rig and double ensemble, Amsterdam, Muziekgebouw, Orkest de Volharding and Doelen Ensemble, conductor Jussi Jaatinen, soloist Irvine Arditti, 2006
- Sea Shell for great chorus, on a text by Alceo (translated by Salvatore Quasimodo). Swedish Radio Choir, Stockholm, 2006
- Da capo II, for 8 instruments, Settimane Musicali di Stresa, Ensemble Bit20, conductor J. Stockhammer, 2007
- Animus II, for viola and live electronics, Paris, Ircam Espace de projection, Festival Agora, soloist Garth Knox, commission by Françoise and Jean-Philippe, 2007
- Strade parallele, for 6 instruments, electronics and video on a text by Norberto Bobbio, Rome, Auditorium Parco della Musica, Ensemble Alter Ego, 2007
- Hard Pace; for trumpet and orchestra, Rome, Auditorium, Orchestra of Santa Cecilia Academy, soloist Håkan Hardenberger, conductor Antonio Pappano, 2007
- Fresco, for five moving bands, 2007
- Unexpected End of Formula, for cello, ensemble and electronics, Köln, WDR FunkHaus, musikFabrik conductor Christian Eggen, soloist Dirk Wietheger, ZKM live-elektronik, 2008
- Animus III, for tuba and live electronics, Köln, WDR FunkHaus, soloist Melvyn Poore, ZKM Live-Elektronik, 2008
- Sirènes, for mixed choir in five groups, orchestra and electronics, commissioned by Ircam-Centre Pompidou, 2009
- Time, Real and Imaginary, Commande d'État francese for mezzo-soprano and four instruments on a text by Samuel Taylor Coleridge, 2009
- Attraverso, for soprano and ensemble, Monteverdi celebrations, commissioned by Music Across Festival of Lombardy and the Teatro Ponchielli of Cremona, 2009
- Jeu de Musica, for ensemble, Strasbourg, Festival Musica, 2010
- Quartett, opera, libretto written in English by the composer, from the pièce by Heiner Müller, commission by Teatro alla Scala, stage direction by La Fura dels Baus, conductor Susanna Mälkki, 2011
- Terra, opera-oratorio, libretto by Valeria Parrella, opening of the celebrations for the 150th anniversary of the Italian Republic, Naples, Teatro San Carlo, stage director Jean Kalman, conductor Jonathan Webb, 2011
- Herzstück, based on a text by Heiner Müller, commission by Neue Vocalsolisten for the Eclat Festival, 2012
- Atopia, oratorio based on a text by Piero della Francesca and Calderón della Barca, Madrid, 2012
- Piano Concerto, for pianoforte and orchestra, with Nic Hodges, Oporto 2013
- Duende, The Dark Notes, with Leila Josefowicz, coproduction of Swedish Radio, RAI, BBC Proms, 2014
- Dentro non ha tempo, for large orchestra, in memoriam Luciana Pestalozza, commission by Teatro alla Scala, conductor Esa-Pekka Salonen, 2014
- Vertical Invader, concerto grosso for reed quintet and orchestra, Calefax Reed Quintet, Radio Filharmonisch Orkest and Concertgebouw, Amsterdam, Radio Filharmonisch Orkest conducted by Osmo Vänskä, 2015.
- Bread, Water and Salt, Orchestra and Chorus of the Accademia Nazionale di Santa Cecilia, conductor Antonio Pappano, soprano Pumeza Matshikiza
- Corpo Elettrico, for violin and orchestra, Porto, 2021

== Sources ==
- Giancarlo Francesconi, by E. Tadini, Milan, Salone Annunciata, 1959
- Sergio Badino, Conversazione con Carlo Chendi. Da Pepito alla Disney e oltre: cinquant'anni di fumetto vissuti da protagonista, Tenué 2006
- Ricciarda Belgiojoso, "Note d'autore. A tu per tu con i compositori d'oggi", Postmedia Books, 2013
- Guido Barbieri, Francesconi, Luca, Enciclopedia Italiana Treccani – Appendix VII (2007)
- Luca Francesconi, Les Esprits libres, in VV. AA. La loi musicale – Ce que la lecture de l'histoire nous (dés)apprend, edited by D. Cohen Levinas, Paris, L'Harmattan, 2000
- Christopher Thomas, Metier, msvcd 92018, Divine Art Recordings Group
- Andrew Clements, Gesualdo Considered as a Murder, The Guardian, Friday 11 June 2004
- Quartett – interview to Luca Francesconi, Teatro alla Scala, Season 2010/2011
- Alexander Destuet, Quartett de Luca Francesconi: la Fura dels Baus ataca otra vez, La Vanguardia 3 July 2015
- Franco Fayenz, Si chiude la ribalta della Scala per Quartett, antologia di soluzioni geniali, Il Sole 24 ore, 8 May 2011
- Silva Menetto, Alla Biennale protagonisti il Don Giovanni a Venezia e giovani ensemble da tutta Europa, Il Sole 24 ore, 30 September 2010
- Giuseppina Manin, La musica è finita, Corriere della sera, 16 September 2008
- Giuseppina Manin, Le mie note sospese per Luciana Abbado, Corriere della Sera, 12 June 2014
- Luca Francesconi, Il sacrificio dei musicisti italiani, Milan, 2005
- Andrew Clements, Prom 13: BBCSO/Mälkki/Josefowicz review – committed and astoundingly vivid, The Guardian, 28 July 2015
- Marie-Aude Roux, Ballata, drame syncretique de Francesconi, Le Monde, 14 November 2002
- Luca Francesconi, Cerca e ricerca, Milan 1994 Pappano, Rundel and Storgards conduct Francesconi
- Massimiliano Viel, Incontro con Luca Francesconi: Il calcolo e l'intuizione. L'elettronica come sfida, in Sonus, Materiali per la musica contemporanea, issue no. 11, December 1993
