= Teppo Järvinen =

Finnish scenographer (born 1967)

Teppo Järvinen (born 1967 in Helsinki) is a Finnish scenographer. He has designed numerous world premieres of Finnish drama as well as classics, musical theatre and opera. Järvinen has made also around one hundred set designs for television. He is married to theatre director Tiina Puumalainen.

Education:

- Master of Arts, Aalto University (UIAH) / Department of Scenography, 1997
- Master of Science in Architecture, Aalto University (Helsinki University of Technology), 1999

Coming up next:

- Sophocles: Antigone (drama), Tampereen Työväen Teatteri (October 2019)

== Set designs ==
Recent designs for stage

- 2019 William Shakespeare: The Tempest (drama), Tampereen Työväen Teatteri, additional credits: costume design
- 2018 Jennifer Haley: The Nether (drama), Tampereen Työväen Teatteri
- 2018 Vesa Nuutinen: Pasi Was Here (drama), Tampereen Työväen Teatteri
- 2017 Andrew Lloyd Webber, Charles Hart & Richard Stilgoe: The Phantom of the Opera, Göteborgsoperan
- 2017 Karl Müller-Berghaus: Die Kalewainen in Pochjola (opera), Turku Music Festival
- 2017 Tuomas Kyrö: The Grump's Finland (drama), Tampereen Työväen Teatteri, additional credits: costume design
- 2016 Juha Jokela: Sumu (drama), Finnish National Theatre
- 2016 Joe Masteroff, Fred Ebb & John Kander: Cabaret (musical), Tampereen Työväen Teatteri, additional credits: costume design
- 2016 Kay Pollak & Sofia Aminoff: Så som i Himmelen (drama), Tampereen Työväen Teatteri
- 2015 Arturo Pérez-Reverte: Tango de la Guardia Vieja (drama & dance). Tampereen Työväen Teatteri
- 2015 Andrew Lloyd Webber, Charles Hart & Richard Stilgoe: The Phantom of the Opera (musical), Finnish National Opera
- 2015 Peter Shaffer: Amadeus (drama), Seinäjoki City Theatre
- 2015 Orvokki Autio: Valokuvavarkaat (drama), Tampereen Työväen Teatteri, additional credits: costume design
- 2014 Andrew Lloyd Webber - Tim Rice: Evita (musical), Tampereen Työväen Teatteri
- 2013 David Yazbek and Terrence McNally: Full Monty (musical), Oulu City Theatre
- 2013 Marshall Brickman - Rick Elice - Andrew Lippa: The Addams Family (musical), Tampereen Työväen Teatteri, additional credits: costume design
- 2013 Juha Jokela: Esitystalous 2 – Tehtävä Espoossa / Performance Economy 2 – The Mission to Espoo (drama) Espoo City Theatre
- 2013 Arto Halonen - Pirjo Toikka - Tuomas Kantelinen: Princess (musical), Tampereen Työväen Teatteri
- 2013 Prosper Mérimée - Tiina Puumalainen: Carmen (drama), Tampereen Työväen Teatteri
- 2012 Juha Jokela: Patriarkka / Patriarch (drama), Finnish National Theatre
- 2012 Jüri Reinvere - Sofi Oksanen: Purge (opera), Finnish National Opera
- 2011 Katja Krohn: Pikkujättiläinen / Little Giant (drama), Finnish National Theatre
- 2011 Mikko Heiniö - Juha Siltanen: Eerik XIV (opera), European Culture Capital production Turku
- 2011 Aino Kallas - Tiina Puumalainen: Sudenmorsian / The Wolf's Bride (drama & dance), Tampereen Työväen Teatteri
- 2010 Tiina Lymi: S.O.S. (drama), Ryhmäteatteri
- 2010 John Kander - Fred Ebb - Bob Fosse: Chicago (musical), Tampereen Työväen Teatteri
- 2010 Juha Jokela: Esitystalous / The Performance Economy (drama), Espoo City Theatre
