= Àlex Ollé =

Spanish theatre director

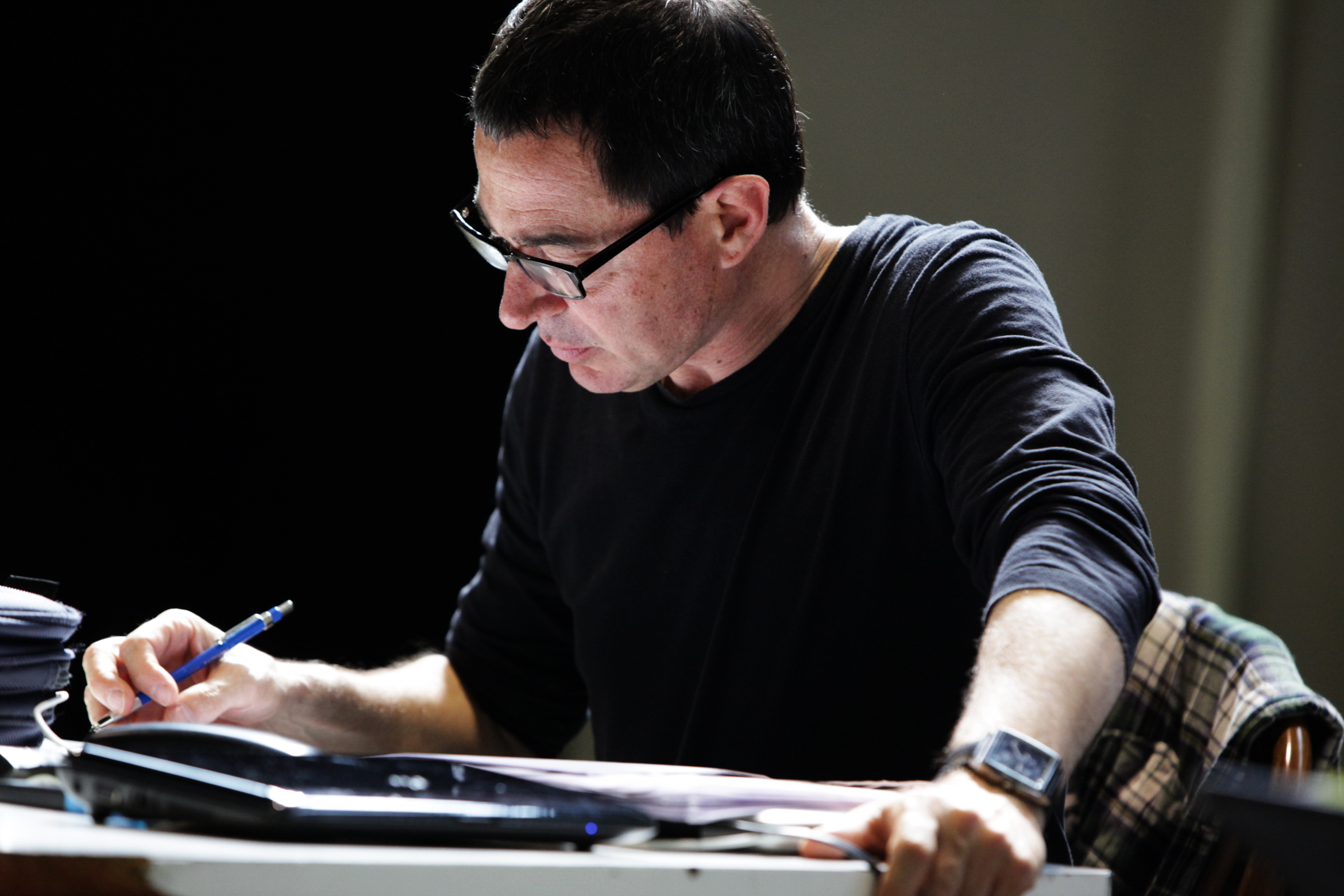
- Born: 11 April 1960 (age 66); Barcelona, Spain
- Occupations: Artistic Director in Opera and Theatre, Resident Artist at Gran Teatre del Liceu
- Website: www.alexolle.com

Àlex Ollé (Catalan pronunciation: [ˈaləks uˈʎe]; born 1960) is one of the six artistic directors of La Fura dels Baus. Prominent works from its early period include Accions (1984), Suz/O/Suz (1985), Tier Mon (1988), Noun (1990) and MTM (1994), which established La Fura dels Baus as a top company among both critics and the public.

== Opera ==
The first operas that Àlex Ollé directed were joint projects with Carlus Padrissa and the artist Jaume Plensa: L’Atlàntida (1996) by Manuel de Falla and Le martyre de Saint Sébastien (1997) by Claude Debussy. These were followed by La damnation de Faust by Héctor Berlioz, which debuted in 1999 at the Salzburg Festival; DQ. Don Quijote en Barcelona (2000), with music by José Luis Turina and libretto by Justo Navarro, which premiered at the Gran Teatre del Liceu de Barcelona; Die Zauberflöte [The magic flute] (2003) by W. A. Mozart, as part of the Ruhr Biennale, a co-production of the Opéra National in Paris and the Teatro Real in Madrid; Bluebeard’s castle by Béla Bartók and Diary of one who disappeared (2007) by Leoš Janáček, presented under a single programme, premiered in Opera Garnier, a co-production of the Opéra National in Paris and the Gran Teatre del Liceu. With the collaboration of Valentina Carrasco, he directed the mise-en-scène of Le grand macabre (2009) by György Ligeti, which premiered in the Théâtre Royal de la Monnaie in Brussels. A coproduction between the Gran Teatre del Liceu, the Théâtre Royal de la Monnaie, the English National Opera and the Opera di Roma. In 2010, this stage work was selected to open the 50th Adelaide Festival of Arts in Australia.

Together with Carlus Padrissa he directed Aufstieg und Fall der Stadt Mahagonny [Rise and fall of the city of Mahagonny] (2010) by Kurt Weill and Bertolt Brecht, which debuted at the Teatro Real in Madrid and was rebroadcast live to 127 movie theatres in Europe and Mexico.

In 2011, he directed Quartet by Luca Francesconi, based on the play of the same name by Heiner Müller. The opera debuted at the Teatro alla Scala in Milan and was co-produced with the Wiener Festwochen. This production received the prestigious Abbiati Award for "La migliore Novità assoluta". This year he is also presenting Tristan und Isolde by Richard Wagner at the Opéra in Lyon. French critics have chosen this production as one of the top three winners of the year by the newspaper Le Temps. In 2011, in collaboration with Valentina Carrasco, he also directed Oedipe by George Enescu, co-produced by the Théâtre Royal de la Monnaie in Brussels and the Théâtre National de l’Opéra in Paris.

His first Verdi Un ballo in maschera, opened in Sydney Opera House in January 2013, won the Helpmann Award for the opera stage direction in the season 2012–2013. This is a production between Opera Sidney, Teatro Colón de Buenos Aires, Théâtre Royal de la Monnaie in Brussels and the Norwegian National Opera & Ballet of Oslo.

During the 2013 he also directed Il Prigioniero Dallapiccola / Erwartung Schoenberg, opened in Justice & Injustice festival in the Opéra de Lyon and Aida, together with Carlus Padrissa, to open the Centenario de l’Arena di Verona. In 2014 he premiered Giacomo Puccini's Madama Butterfly at the Handa Opera; Faust by Charles Gounod, a coproduction of the Teatro Real and the Nederlandse Opera, and Der Fliegende Holländer by Richard Wagner, produced by the Opéra de Lyon, the Opéra de Lille, Opera Australia (Melbourne Opera) and the Bergen Nasjonale Opera.

He directed Pelleas et Melisande, by Claude Debussy, at the Semperoper Dresden in 2015, and later Il Trovatore, by Giuseppe Verdi, a staging inspired by World War I, co-produced by De Nederlandse Opera in Amsterdam and the Opéra National de Paris. In February 2016, this production was rebroadcast live to 180 European cinemas during its representations in Opéra de la Bastille in Paris. In September he opened the season at The Royal Opera House in London with Vincenzo Bellini‘s Norma, a show that was broadcast live in more than100 European cinemas. In October he has premiered La Bohème by Giacomo Puccini in the Teatro Regio Torino, to celebrate the 120th anniversary of its release, a co-production with the Teatro dell'Opera di Roma.

During 2017 he premiered the Christoph Willibald Gluck's Alceste at Opéra Lyon, and the Jeanne d'Arc au Bûcher Arthur Honegger and La damoiselle élue Claude Debussy diptych, co-produced between Oper Frankfurt and Teatro Real de Madrid.

In 2018, he adds to his constant review of the Faust's myth, the Mefistofele by Arrigo Boito, co-produced by the Opéra de Lyon and the Staatsoper Stuttgart.

In 2019, he premiered the newly created contemporary opera Frankenstein at the theater of La Monnaie de Munt, Brussels, with music by Marc Gray and libretto by Júlia Canosa, based on an original idea of Àlex Ollé inspired by the Mary Shelley's novel. In July, he premieres Turandot one of Giacomo Puccini's great operas, at the Tokyo Bunka Kaikan theater within the programming of the Cultural Olympiad Tokyo 2020, that tours in Japan to three other opera theaters. In October 2019, he premieres the opera Manon Lescaut of Giacomo Puccini at the Frankfurt Opera.

In 2020, due to the COVID-19 pandemic, all planned productions were postponed to the following seasons.

In March 2021, he premiered Ariane et Barbe Bleue by Paul Dukas, a coproduction from Opera de Lyon and Teatro Real in Madrid. Later in July he premiered Bizet’s Carmen at the New National Theatre in Tokyo, and in September Idoménéé by André Campra, a coproduction from Ópera de Lille and the Staatsoper Unter den Linden in Berlin.

In 2022 he premiered The Nose by Dmitri Shostakovich, a coproduction between The Royal Danish Opera in Copenhagen and the Théâtre Royal de la Monnaie in Brussels.

In March 2023, he premiered Rusalka by Antonin Dvorák at Bergen National Opera. In October he premiered L'amore dei tre re by Italo Montemezzi, at the Teatro alla Scala in Milan.

In September 2024, he opens the season at the Gran Teatre del Liceu with Lady Macbeth of Mtsensk by Dmitri Shostakovich. Coinciding with the premiere, the book Ópera manual de instrucciones / Lady Macbeth de Mtsensk (La Cama Sol Publishing), written by Pablo Ley and Àlex Ollé, is published.

In 2025, he received the Gold Medal of the Gran Teatre del Liceu in recognition of his artistic career and his longstanding association with the institution.

From the 2020–2021 season to the 2025–2026 season, he was Artist-in-Residence at the Gran Teatre del Liceu in Barcelona, where he launched Òh!pera, a project dedicated to the creation of micro-operas and the promotion of emerging talent in composition, dramaturgy, and stage direction. He continues to serve as the project's artistic director.

In 2026, he premiered productions of Bluthochzeit by Wolfgang Fortner at Oper Frankfurt and Simon Boccanegra by Giuseppe Verdi at the Maggio Musicale Fiorentino in Florence. That same year, he received the Ópera XXI Award for Best Stage Direction for his work on Lady Macbeth of Mtsensk and Il trovatore, as well as the Premi Nacional de Cultura de Catalunya (National Culture Award of Catalonia), presented by the Government of Catalonia (Generalitat de Catalunya). In addition, his production of Bluthochzeit at Oper Frankfurt was nominated for the 2026 International Opera Awards in the Best New Production category.

== Large-scale shows ==
In collaboration with Carlus Padrissa, Ollé created and directed Mediterrani, mar olímpic, the epicentre of the opening ceremony of the 1992 Barcelona Olympic Games, an event that fascinated and left a mark on millions of viewers around the world.

He has also participated in many large-scale shows, either alone or in collaboration with Carlus Padrissa, such as La navaja en el ojo, for the opening of the 2001 Valencia Biennial; Naumaquia, created for the Universal Forum of Cultures in Barcelona in 2004; the opening of the Track Cycling World Championships in Palma de Mallorca in 2007; Window of the city, the thematic show for Expo 2010 in Shanghai, China and Istambul, Istambul in 2012, in celebration of the 40th anniversary of the Istanbul Foundation for Culture and Arts (IKSV). In 2014 he created, with the architect Benedetta Tagliabue BCN.RESET, a route of ephemeral architecture through the streets of Barcelona.

== Theater ==
The plays that Àlex Ollé has directed include F@ust 3.0 (1998), based on the novel Faust by Johann Wolfgang von Goethe; XXX (2001), based on La philosophie dans le boudoir [Philosophy in the bedroom] by the Marquis de Sade, both in collaboration with Carlus Padrissa; Metamorphosis (2005), together with Javier Daulte, based on Franz Kafka’s text and Boris Godunov (2008), with David Plana, a play based on the attack on the Dubrovka Theatre in Moscow and on the work of Alexander Pushkin. In 2010 he co-directed Samuel Beckett’s First love with Miquel Gorriz, a co-production of the Chekov International Theatre Festival in Moscow and the Grec Theatre Festival in Barcelona. In 2018, he premieres L'Histoire du Soldat, by Igor Stravinski, at the Radiant-Bellevue Theater, co-produced by Lyon's National Opera, Lausanne's Opera and Montpellier's National Opera, to celebrate the 100th anniversary of the premiere. In 2026, he premieres I Persiani (The Persians) by Aeschylus at the Greek Theatre of Syracuse and the Great Theatre of Pompeii, where it serves as the closing production of the ninth edition of the Pompeii Theatrum Mundi Festival.

== Cinema ==
His sole foray into the world of film is Fausto 5.0, a movie he co-directed with Carlus Padrissa and Isidro Ortiz, a screenplay by Fernando León de Aranoa. Debuting in 2001 at the Sitges International Fantastic Film Festival, it received the Méliès d’Or Award in 2003 (among others) for the best European fantasy film.

== Sources ==
- Centro Dramático Nacional, Boris Godunov, La Fura dels Baus, 2008 p. 6
- Crusells Valeta, Magí, "Ollé, Àlex", Directores de cine en Cataluña: de la A a la Z, Edicions Universitat Barcelona, 2009, p. 185. ISBN 84-475-3316-6,
- Dessau, Bruce, "La Fura Dels Baus bring their eye-popping take on Ligeti to London", The Times, September 5, 2009
