= The Addams Family (musical) =

Musical comedy

- A New Musical Comedy
- One of 2010 theatrical release posters
- Music: Andrew Lippa
- Lyrics: Andrew Lippa
- Book: Marshall Brickman; Rick Elice
- Basis: comic strip The Addams Family by Charles Addams
- Productions: 2009 Chicago tryout 2010 Broadway; 2011 North American tour 2013 US/Asia tour 2017 UK tour 2021 UK tour 2024 West End Concert; 2025 North American tour 2025 UK tour

The Addams Family is a musical comedy with music and lyrics by Andrew Lippa and book by Marshall Brickman and Rick Elice. The show is based upon The Addams Family characters created by Charles Addams in his single-panel gag cartoons, which depict a ghoulish American family with an affinity for all things macabre. Although numerous film and television adaptations of Addams' cartoons exist, the musical is the first stage show based on the characters. The Addams Family is also the first show produced by Elephant Eye Theatricals.

After a tryout in Chicago in 2009, the musical opened on Broadway in April 2010. The original cast featured Nathan Lane as Gomez and Bebe Neuwirth as Morticia. The production closed on December 31, 2011, and a revised national tour of North America began in September 2011.

The Addams Family won several awards during its Broadway run including a Drama Desk Award for Outstanding Set Design, an Outer Critics Circle Award for Outstanding Set Design, and the 2010 Drama League Award for Distinguished Achievement in Musical Theatre Award (presented to Nathan Lane). The show was nominated for two Tony Awards, among other nominations.

== Synopsis ==
=== Act One ===
The ghoulish Addams family are visiting the graveyard for an annual gathering of all family members (living, dead, and undecided) to celebrate what it is to be an Addams ("When You're an Addams"). Uncle Fester finds that Wednesday is in love with Lucas and plans to invite his family for dinner, so he stops the Ancestors' return to their graves to enlist their help, not allowing them to return until love triumphs, much to the ancestors' dismay ("Fester's Manifesto").

Wednesday and Lucas instruct their families to act normal so they can all enjoy a simple dinner ("One Normal Night"). As the Beinekes arrive, Mal is more skeptical, while Alice is more supportive of Lucas' love. Gomez then shows his collection of torture devices to Mal, and then discuss the love between Lucas and Wednesday. Meanwhile, Morticia shows Alice her old family, then talks to her about how keeping secrets can hurt a marriage ("Secrets"). While Gomez has a discussion with Lucas and Wednesday about their romantic life, Morticia becomes almost convinced that Gomez is keeping a secret. Pugsley begins to fear that Wednesday will stop torturing him, to which Grandma advises him to use his time wisely and not dwell on it ("What If"). Pugsley then steals Grandma's bottle of acrimonium (a powerful potion that acts as a truth serum) and plots to use it to break up Wednesday and Lucas.

At dinner, all the assembly play Obligacion de Revelar (Full Disclosure), or what the Addamses call "The Game," in which each person present reveals a secret after drinking from a chalice. Gomez tells a story of a loyal husband and wife and a box of secrets never to be opened, Uncle Fester admits he's in love with the Moon, and Grandma confesses to having not spent her time wisely ("Full Disclosure (Part 1)"). As Wednesday is about to go, Pugsley slips the acrimonium into the drink, but the chalice is given to Alice, who drinks it and drunkenly declares her marriage to Mal a loveless mess as she reveals her misery and woe ("Waiting"), disturbing everyone. As Mal, humiliated, attempts to leave with his family, Wednesday announces that she and Lucas will marry, much to Morticia's outrage at Gomez for keeping it a secret. Chaos engulfs both families, and Uncle Fester, trying to be helpful, instructs the Ancestors to create a sudden, terrible storm, creating a tornado trapping everyone in the mansion for the night ("Full Disclosure (Part 2)").

=== Act Two ===
During the storm, Wednesday tries to leave, but Lucas wants to stay and work things out with their families, leading the pair to have their first fight and Wednesday calling him out for not being impulsive enough. Later, Morticia fears her marriage is broken beyond saving, and reminds herself that death is waiting for her ("Just Around The Corner"). Uncle Fester plays his ukulele, singing a love song to the Moon ("The Moon and Me").

Walking out in the yard, Wednesday runs into Gomez. He is happy she's found someone to love, yet sad that his daughter is growing up ("Happy/Sad"). Wednesday is left worrying that she and Lucas are too different. Then as a show of trust, Lucas blindfolds Wednesday and lets her shoot an apple off his head with a crossbow ("Crazier Than You"). She succeeds, and the two reconcile. Pugsley cannot sleep, and Morticia relaxes him a bit but he cannot bring himself to confess what he did to Alice. Mal, having seen what Lucas did, and with a newfound appreciation for his family, reconciles with Alice as the song "Crazier than You" continues. As Gomez plots to fix his marriage with a trip to Paris, Fester tells him that Morticia is leaving. In a frantic attempt to reconcile with Morticia, Gomez helps Morticia realize she has become like her judgemental mother, explaining why it is hard to tell her the truth. As the two reconcile, they sing "Live Before We Die", then engage in a loving tango ("Tango de Amor").

The now reunited families then deduce that Pugsley stole the potion so that Wednesday would stop loving Lucas. However, since it ultimately brought everyone back together, he is congratulated by his family. Uncle Fester tells everyone he is flying off to be with the Moon. As the families sing one last ballad, they are all shocked as Lurch sings out loud for the first time, just as Fester lands on the moon and the ancestors are finally allowed to return to their graves ("Move Toward the Darkness").

== Musical numbers ==
=== Chicago (Pre-Broadway) ===
Act I

- "Overture" – Ancestors
- "Clandango" – Addams Family, Ancestors
- "Let's Not Talk About Anything Else (Prelude)" – Fester, Ancestors
- "Pulled" – Wednesday, Pugsley
- "Passionate and True" – Morticia, Gomez
- "One Normal Night" – Company
- "As We're Slowly Dying" – Wednesday, Lucas †
- "Let's Not Talk About Anything Else" – Fester, Ancestors
- "At Seven" – Mal, Gomez, Alice, Morticia, Wednesday, Lucas
- "What If" – Pugsley
- "Full Disclosure (Part 1)" – Company
- "Waiting" – Alice, Ancestors
- "Full Disclosure (Part 2)" – Company

Act II

- "Opening Act II" – Ancestors
- "Second Banana" – Morticia, Ancestors
- "Happy/Sad" – Gomez
- "Crazier Than You" – Wednesday, Lucas
- "The Moon and Me" – Fester, Female Ancestors
- "Let's Not Talk About Anything Else But Love (Reprise)" – Mal, Gomez, Fester
- "Teach Me How To Tango" – Alice, Gomez, Morticia
- "Tango de Amor" – Orchestra
- "In the Arms" – Mal, (Alice ‡), Ancestors
- "In the Arms (Reprise)" – Mal, Alice, Ancestors §
- "Move Toward the Darkness" – Company

† Cut after the first preview.

‡ Added to song during the run

§ Cut during the run.

=== Broadway ===
Act I

- "Overture" – Ancestors
- "When You're an Addams" – Addams Family, Ancestors
- "Pulled" – Wednesday, Pugsley
- "Where Did We Go Wrong" – Morticia, Gomez
- "One Normal Night" – Wednesday, Lucas, Company
- "Morticia" – Gomez, Male Ancestors
- "What If" – Pugsley
- "Full Disclosure (Part 1)" – Company
- "Waiting" – Alice, Ancestors
- "Full Disclosure (Part 2)" – Company

Act II

- "Opening Act II" – Ancestors
- "Just Around the Corner" – Morticia, Ancestors
- "The Moon and Me" – Fester, Female Ancestors
- "Happy/Sad" – Gomez
- "Crazier Than You" – Wednesday, Lucas
- "Let's Not Talk About Anything Else But Love" – Mal, Gomez, Fester
- "Let's Not Talk About Anything Else But Love (Reprise)" † – Grandma, Gomez, Fester
- "Live Before We Die" – Gomez, Morticia
- "Tango de Amor" – Orchestra
- "Move Toward the Darkness" – Company

=== US Tour and current productions ===
The national tours of the production changed the plot as follows:

- After the opening song, Uncle Fester addresses the audience directly about the love between Wednesday and Lucas, and states that the Ancestors will not be allowed to return to their graves until love prevails.
- Wednesday confesses her love of Lucas to Gomez but also makes him promise not to disclose her secret to Morticia until the two families all have dinner later that night. Morticia observes that Gomez is acting unusually, and this causes tension between them, especially because Morticia believes that Gomez has never lied to her before.
- Gomez's The Game parable is instead a variant of the Pandora's Box legend. When the dinner causes these secrets to be revealed, Morticia wonders if her marriage can be saved, and Mal and Alice also have disagreements.
- All plot references to the giant squid Bernice are completely removed.
- When Mal observes the sacrifice Lucas is willing to make to Wednesday by having the apple shot off his head, he reconciles with Alice.
- Gomez stops Morticia just as she is about to leave the family by reminding her that she acted the same way that Wednesday did when Morticia was younger.
- Some of the songs are either rearranged into new ones or completely cut altogether. "Pulled" was transposed a half step lower, and "Just Around the Corner" was transposed a half step higher. Most notably, the Act II song "Let's Not Talk About Anything Else But Love" is cut, and portions of the lyrics are used in Act I with Fester's song "Fester's Manifesto" and a reprise titled "But Love".

Act I

- "Overture" – Ancestors
- "When You're an Addams" – Addams Family, Ancestors
- "Fester's Manifesto" † – Fester
- "Two Things" † – Gomez
- "Wednesday's Growing Up" † – Gomez
- "Three Things" † – Gomez
- "Trapped" † – Gomez
- "Honor Roll" † / "Pulled" – Wednesday, Pugsley
- "Four Things" † – Gomez
- "One Normal Night" – Company
- "But Love (Reprise 1 & 2)" † – Fester, Ancestors
- "Secrets" † – Morticia, Alice, Female Ancestors
- "Trapped (Reprise)" † / "Gomez's What If" † – Gomez
- "What If" – Pugsley
- "Full Disclosure (Part 1)" – Company
- "Waiting" – Alice, Ancestors
- "Full Disclosure (Part 2)" – Company

Act II

- "Opening Act II" – Ancestors
- "Just Around the Corner" – Morticia, Ancestors
- "The Moon and Me" – Fester, Female Ancestors
- "Happy/Sad" – Gomez
- "Crazier Than You" † – Wednesday, Lucas, Mal, Alice
- "Not Today" † – Gomez
- "Live Before We Die" – Gomez, Morticia
- "Tango de Amor" – Orchestra
- "Move Toward the Darkness" – Lurch, Company
- "Bows" † – Company

† Not included on the original Broadway Cast Album.

== Development ==
In 2007, the producers announced that they had obtained the rights from the Tee and Charles Addams Foundation to create a musical adaptation of The Addams Family for Broadway, and they anticipated an opening during the 2009–2010 season after an out-of-town tryout. This was the first time that Charles Addams' comic creations were licensed to serve as the basis for a stage production. The musical's lead producers were Stuart Oken and Roy Furman. In addition to Oken and Furman, Vivek Tiwary also joined The Addams Family musical's team of producers. The Addams Foundation reportedly retained control over the show's content and insisted that, instead of drawing the plot from The Addams Family television series or films, the production team devise an original musical based solely on Addams' cartoons.

Marshall Brickman and Rick Elice were engaged to write the book, and Andrew Lippa composed the show's score. Improbable theatre founders Julian Crouch and Phelim McDermott were the original directors and designers, with choreography by Sergio Trujillo. Crouch said that, when brainstorming ideas for the overall appearance of the show, he and McDermott turned to the character of Uncle Fester for inspiration, asking themselves, "If Fester was going to do a Broadway show, what kind of Broadway show would he do?" The partners described the result as "an off-beat take on 19th Century Gothic".

Some changes were made after the Chicago tryout. The songs "Clandango", "Passionate and True", "At Seven", and "Second Banana" were replaced with "When You're an Addams", "Where Did We Go Wrong?", "Morticia", and "Just Around the Corner". The songs "One Normal Night", "Full Disclosure, Part 2", "Crazier Than You", "Move Toward the Darkness", and "Tango De Amor" were rewritten.

== Productions ==
=== Broadway ===
The show began previews on Broadway at the Lunt-Fontanne Theatre on March 8, 2010, with an official opening night of April 8. The production was originally estimated to cost $10 million, but more recent reports give the budget as $15 million.

All of the cast from the Chicago tryout transferred to Broadway. The creative team included direction by McDermott and Crouch, choreography by Trujillo, lighting by Natasha Katz, puppets by Basil Twist, special effects by Gregory Meeh, and orchestrations by Larry Hochman.

The show won both the Drama Desk Award and Outer Critics Circle Award for Outstanding Set Design but received no other major awards. However, it did win the Broadway.com Audience Awards for Favorite New Broadway Musical, Favorite Performance by a Featured Actor in a Broadway Musical (Kevin Chamberlin), Favorite Breakthrough Performance (Krysta Rodriguez), and Favorite Onstage Pair (Nathan Lane and Bebe Neuwirth).

A May 2011 article in Playbill reported that the show had by then grossed over $62 million. The show celebrated its 500th performance on June 16, 2011. Playbill reported in May 2011 that "plans for other international productions are currently underway."

Cassandra Peterson was in talks to take over the role of Morticia until the producers decided to close the show at the end of 2011.

The Broadway production closed on December 31, 2011, after 35 previews and 722 performances.

=== National tours ===
A United States tour began in September 2011 at the Mahalia Jackson Theater for the Performing Arts in New Orleans. Tour stops included Atlanta, Miami, Boston, Hartford, Saint Paul, Philadelphia, Dallas, Pittsburgh, Buffalo, Los Angeles, Kansas City, Orlando, Florida, and San Diego. Most of these cities include those that are members of Elephant Eye Theatricals and worked on producing The Addams Family on Broadway and tour. The musical was also performed in Toronto, Ontario, Canada, at the Toronto Centre for the Arts during November 16–27, 2011. Douglas Sills and Sara Gettelfinger played Gomez and Morticia Addams, respectively. The touring version has "a new central plot conflict, new or revised or reordered songs to replace old ones, fresh orchestrations and dance where necessary." The tour finished in December 2012 at the Segerstrom Center for the Arts in Costa Mesa.

A non-equity tour, produced by Phoenix Entertainment, launched in 2013, starring Jennifer Fogarty as Wednesday, KeLeen Snowgren as Morticia, Jesse Sharp as Gomez, Shaun Rice as Uncle Fester, and Sam Primack as Pugsley, and toured the US for one year, before moving to Asia. Most of the cast reprised in the Asian leg of the tour except for Sam Primack, who was replaced by Connor Barth as Pugsley.

Another non-equity tour, directed and choreographed by Antoinette Dipietropolo, kicked off on January 17, 2025 at the Palace Theater in Waterbury, Connecticut, starring Rodrigo Aragon as Gomez Addams and Renee Kathleen Koher as Morticia Addams, and closed on November 2, 2025 at the Kravis Center for the Performing Arts in West Palm Beach, Florida.

=== Return to Chicago ===
The Addams Family returned to Chicago in a sit-down production at Mercury Theater Chicago opening February 5, 2015, after a week of previews, and closing April 15. The production, which featured a tighter post-National Tour script and a more Chicago improv-oriented cast, was directed by L. Walter Stearns, musical directed by Eugene Dizon, and choreographed by Brenda Didier; with scene design by Bob Knuth, lighting by Nick Belley, sound by Mike Ross, costumes by Frances Maggio, and magic by Neil Tobin.

The cast featured Karl Hamilton (Gomez), Rebecca Prescott (Morticia), Harter Clingman (Uncle Fester), Amanda Hartley (Grandma), Dara Cameron (Wednesday), Brennan Dougherty (Pugsley Addams), Jeff Diebold (Lurch), Jason Grimm (Mal Beineke), Cory Goodrich (Alice Beineke), and Henry McGinniss (Lucas Beineke).

The show received unanimous rave reviews. "Comic perfection at the Mercury. It's a very good bet that The Addams Family will haunt the Mercury for months to come" (Chicago Sun-Times). "Much more relaxed and infinitely funnier. Enjoyed L. Walter Stearns Mercury Theater production more than any of my previous visits with this family [including pre-Broadway tryout, Broadway, and National Tour production]. Relentless focus on laughs" (Chicago Tribune). "An absolute delight! The best show I've seen so far this year" (New City Chicago). The production was honored with three 2015 Jeff Award nominations and won Outstanding Production—Musical—Midsize.

=== International productions ===
The first international production opened in March 2012 at Teatro Renault, São Paulo, Brazil, produced by T4F with Marisa Orth and Daniel Boaventura as Morticia and Gomez, respectively. It closed in December 2012. The same production started on January 10, 2013, at Vivo Rio, in Rio de Janeiro. A Brazilian revival opened on March 10, 2022, in São Paulo at the same Teatro Renault, with Marisa Orth and Daniel Boaventura reprising their roles.

The Addams Family had its European premiere on September 29, 2012, at Östgötateatern, Norrköping, Sweden, directed by Mattias Carlsson and conducted by Johan Siberg. The cast included Petra Nielsen as Morticia, Christian Zell as Gomez, Jenny Holmgren as Wednesday, Fabian Nikolajeff and Kalle Jansson as Pugsley, Jesper Barkselius as Fester, Gunnel Samuelsson as Grandma, Jan Unestam as Lurch, Carina Söderman as Alice, Sven Angleflod as Mal, and Linus Henriksson as Lucas.

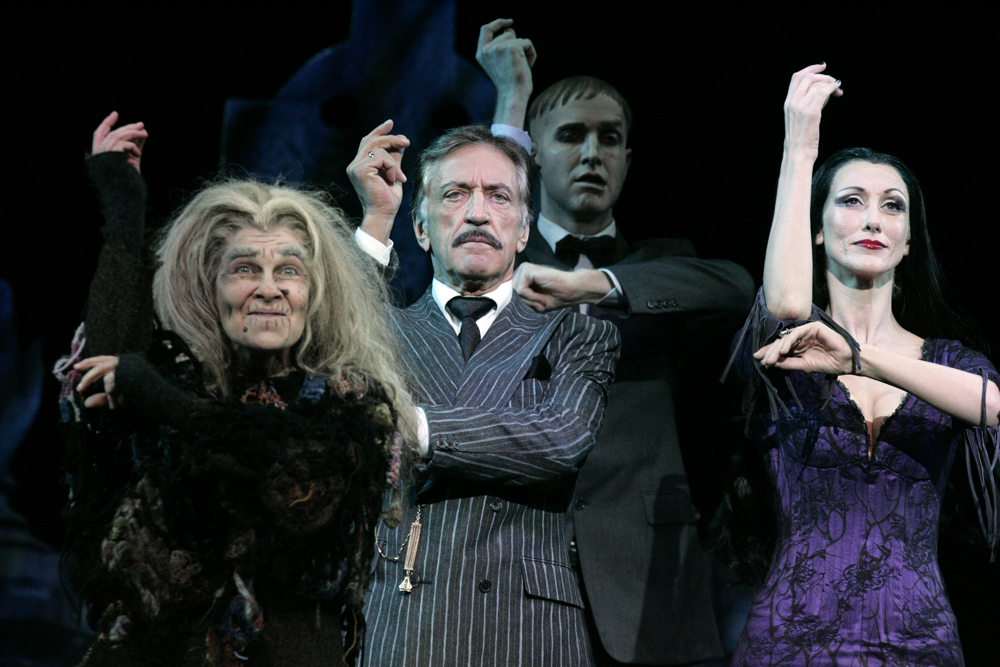
The musical performed in Sydney, 2013

The musical premiered at the Capitol Theatre in Sydney, Australia, starting in March 2013. The cast includes John Waters as Gomez Addams, Chloe Dallimore as Morticia Addams, Russell Dykstra as Uncle Fester, Teagan Wouters as Wednesday Addams and Ben Hudson as Lurch. The show closed on June 9, 2013. It had been hoped to tour to other Australian cities but it is understood the show had struggled at the box office and those plans were cancelled.

The musical had its Argentinian premiere on June 19, 2013, at the Teatro Ópera in Buenos Aires, produced by T4F. The cast included Gabriel Goity as Homero (Gomez), Julieta Díaz as Morticia, Santiago Ríos as Tío Lucas (Uncle Fester), Gabi Goldberg as Abuela (Grandma), Alejandro Viola as Mauricio Beineke (Mal Beineke), Dolores Ocampo as Alice Beineke, Laura Esquivel as Merlina (Wednesday), Marcelo Albamonte as Largo (Lurch), and Marco Di Mónaco as Tomás Beineke (Lucas Beineke). The role of Pericles (Pugsley) was played by four children: Kevin La Bella, Jorge Chamorro, Tadeo Galvé, and Valentino Grizutti.

The Finnish premiere of The Addams Family took place in Tampereen Työväen Teatteri, also known as the TTT-Theatre of Tampere, on October 4, 2013. Directed by Tiina Puumalainen, visually designed by Teppo Järvinen, and conducted by Pekka Siistonen, the production featured a cast of Puntti Valtonen (Gomez), Eriikka Väliahde (Morticia), Laura Alajääski (Wednesday), Jukka Nylund (Pugsley), Matti Pussinen-Eloranta (Mumma / Grandma), Samuli Muje (Fester), Minna Hokkanen (Alice), Mika Honkanen (Mal), Juha-Matti Koskela (Lucas), and Sami Eerola (Lurch).

Los Locos Addams opened on October 31, 2013, at Teatro Marsano in Lima, Peru, directed by Domenico Poggi. It was produced by La Gran Manzana. The cast featured Diego Bertie as Homero (Gomez), Fiorella Rodriguez as Morticia, Nicolás Fantinato as Tío Lucas (Uncle Fester), Patricia Portocarrero and Fiorella Rojas as Abuela (Grandma), Gina Yangali as Merlina (Wednesday), Gustavo Mayer as Largo (Lurch), Luis Baca as Walter (Lucas) Beineke, Trilce Cavero as Alice Beineke, Miguel Alvarez as Mal Beineke, and Giuseppino Castellano and Brando Gallesi as Pericles (Pugsley).

The Addams Family was staged at the Meralco Theater in Manila, the Philippines, by Atlantis Productions, Inc., from November 15 to December 1, 2013. Cast members included Arnell Ignacio (Gomez), Eula Valdez (Morticia), Kayla Rivera (Wednesday), and Ryan Gallagher (Lucas).

The Addams Family debuted in the German language in July 2014 in Merzig and closed in September 2014. That December it was staged in Bremen. The cast included theatre and television actors Uwe Kröger (Gomez), Edda Petri (Morticia), Jana Stelley (Wednesday), Enrico DePieri (Uncle Fester), Anne Welte (Grandma), Noah Walczuch (Pugsley), Ethan Freeman (Mal Beineke), April Hailer (Alice Beineke), and Dominik Hees (Lucas Beineke). The German cast also produced an album, published in December 2014.

The Addams Family premiered in Milan, Italy, in October 2014. The cast included Elio and Geppi Cucciari as Gomez and Morticia. Costumes were designed by stylist Antonio Marras. Musical supervisor Cinzia Pennesi, Set Design Guido Fiorato, Light Design Marco Filibeck. The Italian version was directed by Giorgio Gallione and translated and adapted by Italian writer Stefano Benni. Other cast members included Pierpaolo Lopatriello (Uncle Fester), Giulia Odetto (Wednesday), Leonardo Garbetta, Emanuele Ghizzinardi, and Giacomo Nasta (Pugsley), Sergio Mancinelli (Grandma), Filippo Musenga (Lurch), Paolo Avanzini (Lucas Beineke), Clara Maselli (Alice Beineke), and Andrea Spina (Mal Beineke).

In Mexico, the show opened in October 2014 as Los Locos Addams, the name of the TV series in Mexico, starring Susana Zabaleta as Morticia, Jesús Ochoa as Homero (Gomez), Gloria Aura as Merlina (Wednesday), Miguel Ángel Pérez and Sebastián Gallegos as Pericles (Puglsey), Gerardo González as Tío Lucas (Uncle Fester), Raquel Pankowsky as Abuela (Grandma), José Roberto Pisano as Lurch, Luca Duhart as Tomás (Lucas) Beineke, Tomás Castellanos as Mauricio (Mal) Beineke, and Marisol del Olmo as Alicia (Alice) Beineke.

In France, a French-language production opened in September 2017 at Le Palace in Paris as part of their 2017–2018 season. After the last show in January 2018, the show moved to the Casino de Paris on October 7, 2018, for a limited engagement.

On April 19, 2019, the premiere of the Broadway musical "The Addams Family" took place in Kyiv, on the main stage of the Kyiv National Academic Operetta Theater of Ukraine.

In Malta, a production in English premiered in the Mediterranean islands by ARTHAUS in March 2020, with the Artistic Direction of Lucienne Camilleri, Musical Direction by Ryan Paul Abela, and with Stefania Grech Vella as the Executive Producer. It was presented in association with Theatrical Rights Worldwide (TRW). The production took place in Malta's Capital at the Mediterranean Conference Centre, Valletta. About the production in Malta Andrew Lippa wrote in a Tweet on March 4, 2020; "My late father spent 6 months in Malta in 1952. He told great stories about the country and its people. So thrilled "The Addams Family" is playing there now. Life is remarkable!"

The Russian premiere of the musical took place in Tyumen in city' s repertory drama theatre on June 4, 2021. Official name of the version is "Семейка Аддамс". The production started quite successfully, theatre's website crashed due to high number of visitors who wanted to buy ticket. Roles of Morticia, Wednesday and Pugsley feature double cast, while performers for other roles have no alternates. The new production received 9 (out of 10 for the genre) nominations for the Golden Mask award, the most prestigious theater award in the country.

A South African production of The Addams Family opened December 14, 2024 at The Homecoming Centre in Cape Town. The show features several notable South African stage veterans including Tiaan Rautenbach, Samantha Peo and Brendan van Rhyn.

The first Danish production of The Addams Family opened March 16, 2023 at NørregadeTeatret, Maribo, running till April 2.

On March 5, 2025, The Addams Family premiered in Portugal at the Teatro Maria Matos, Lisbon, produced by Força de Produção.

=== United Kingdom ===
A major UK and Ireland tour opened at the Edinburgh Festival Theatre on April 20, 2017. It starred Cameron Blakely as Gomez, Samantha Womack as Morticia, Les Dennis as Fester, and Carrie Hope Fletcher as Wednesday. The production was directed by Matthew White, choreographed by Alistair David, with design by Diego Pitarch, sound design by Richard Brooker and lighting design by Ben Cracknell.

The UK leg of the tour finished at the Orchard Theatre in Dartford on November 4, 2017, and then the production was transferred to Singapore, where it ran at the MES Theatre from November 15 to December 3, 2017.

After being postponed for more than a year due to the COVID-19 pandemic, a second UK and Ireland tour started on November 5, 2021, at the Theatre Royal, Nottingham, with Cameron Blakely reprising his role as Gomez, Joanne Clifton as Morticia, Scott Paige as Fester, Kingsley Morton as Wednesday, Kara Lane as Alice Beineke, Sean Kingsley as Mal Beineke and Ahmed Hamad as Lucas Beineke, and closed on April 30, 2022, at the Norwich Theatre Royal.

On 31 October 2023, it was announced the musical would be performed live in concert at the London Palladium on 12 and 13 February 2024. Ramin Karimloo, Michelle Visage, Lesley Joseph and Ryan Kopel starred as Gomez, Morticia, Grandma and Lucas. It was directed by Matthew White, with choreography by Alistair David, production design by Diego Pitarch, orchestrations by Richard Beadle, lighting design by Ben Cracknell, Programmed by Tom Young, assisted by Dan Heesem, sound design by Richard Brooker and casting by Jane Deitch. Book is by Marshall Brickman and Rick Elice, and music and lyrics by Andrew Lippa, based on the characters created by Charles Addams.

A third UK tour kicked off on July 10, 2025, at the Birmingham Hippodrome, starring Ricardo Afonso as Gomez Addams and Alexandra Burke as Morticia Addams, and concluded on August 30, 2025 at the Blackpool Opera House.

== Casts ==
The principal original casts of the major productions of The Addams Family.

| Role | Chicago | Broadway | US tour | US/Asia tour | Chicago | UK tour | UK tour | West End concert | US tour | UK tour |
| Role | 2009 | 2010 | 2011 | 2013 | 2015 | 2017 | 2021 | 2024 | 2025 | 2025 |
|---|---|---|---|---|---|---|---|---|---|---|
| Gomez Addams | Nathan Lane | Nathan Lane | Douglas Sills | Jesse Sharp | Karl Hamilton | Cameron Blakely | Cameron Blakely | Ramin Karimloo | Rodrigo Aragon | Ricardo Afonso |
| Morticia Addams | Bebe Neuwirth | Bebe Neuwirth | Sara Gettelfinger | KeLeen Snowgren | Rebecca Prescott | Samantha Womack | Joanne Clifton | Michelle Visage | Renee Kathleen Koher | Alexandra Burke |
| Wednesday Addams | Krysta Rodriguez | Krysta Rodriguez | Cortney Wolfson | Jennifer Fogarty | Dara Cameron | Carrie Hope Fletcher | Kingsley Morton | Chumisa Dornford-May | Melody Munitz | Lauren Jones |
| Uncle Fester | Kevin Chamberlin | Kevin Chamberlin | Blake Hammond | Shaun Rice | Harter Clingman | Les Dennis | Scott Paige | Sam Buttery | Chris Carsten | Clive Rowe |
| Mal Beineke | Terrence Mann | Terrence Mann | Martin Vidnovic | Mark Poppleton | Jason Grimm | Dale Rapley | Sean Kingsley | Sean Kingsley | John Adkison | Dale Rapley |
| Alice Beineke | Carolee Carmello | Carolee Carmello | Crista Moore | Blair Heather Anderson | Cory Goodrich | Charlotte Page | Kara Lane | Kara Lane | Sarah Mackenzie Baron | Kara Lane |
| Lucas Beineke | Wesley Taylor | Wesley Taylor | Brian Justin Crum | Bryan Welnicki | Henry McGinniss | Oliver Ormson | Ahmed Hamad | Ryan Kopel | David Eldridge | Jacob Fowler |
| Pugsley Addams | Adam Riegler | Adam Riegler | Patrick D. Kennedy | Connor Barth Sam Primrack | Brennan Dougherty | Grant McIntyre | Grant McIntyre | Nicholas McLean | Logan Clinger | Nicholas McLean |
| Grandma Addams | Jackie Hoffman | Jackie Hoffman | Pippa Pearthree | Amanda Bruton | Amanda Hartley | Valda Aviks | Valda Aviks | Lesley Joseph | Shereen Hickman | Lesley Joseph |
| Lurch | Zachary James | Zachary James | Tom Corbeil | Dan Olsen | Jeff Diebold | Dickon Gough | Dickon Gough | Dickon Gough | Jackson Barnes | Dickon Gough |

=== Notable replacements ===
Broadway (2010–11)

- Gomez: Roger Rees
- Morticia: Brooke Shields
- Wednesday: Rachel Potter
- Fester: Brad Oscar
- Alice: Heidi Blickenstaff

US National Tour (2011-12)

- Alice: Gaelen Gilliland
- Lurch: Zachary James

== Analysis of book and music ==
In addition to the original characters created by Addams, the musical introduces the new roles of Mal, Alice, and Lucas Beineke, who are described as "straight arrow Midwesterners." The ensemble consists of a group of Addams Family ancestors, each from a different time period.

Lippa said he wrote most of the score to match each character's personality. This included giving Gomez a Flamenco-style Spanish score, Wednesday a more contemporary score, and Fester a vaudevillian score. "Let's Not Talk About Anything Else but Love" is "jazzy/swingy/catchy" and "Happy/Sad" is a ballad reminiscent of Stephen Sondheim.

== Original Broadway cast recording ==
The Addams Family (Cast Recording of the Musical)

Soundtrack album by Andrew Lippa
- Released: June 8, 2010
- Recorded: April 19, 2010
- Label: Decca Broadway
- Producer: Andrew Lippa

An original Broadway cast recording was produced by Decca Broadway. Featuring most of the show's musical numbers, it was released on June 8, 2010, although it was available to purchase at the Lunt-Fontanne Theatre from June 1, 2010.

The album was recorded on April 19, 2010, and was produced by Lippa.

Track listing
| No. | Title | Length |
|---|---|---|
| 1. | "The Addams Family Theme" | 0:16 |
| 2. | "Overture" | 1:58 |
| 3. | "When You're an Addams" | 4:25 |
| 4. | "Pulled" | 2:59 |
| 5. | "Where Did We Go Wrong" | 2:20 |
| 6. | "One Normal Night" | 4:45 |
| 7. | "Morticia" | 3:49 |
| 8. | "What If?" | 2:06 |
| 9. | "Full Disclosure" | 2:34 |
| 10. | "Waiting" | 2:25 |
| 11. | "Full Disclosure (Part 2)" | 1:09 |
| 12. | "Just Around the Corner" | 3:58 |
| 13. | "The Moon and Me" | 3:03 |
| 14. | "Happy/Sad" | 3:55 |
| 15. | "Crazier Than You" | 2:51 |
| 16. | "Let's Not Talk About Anything Else But Love" | 3:19 |
| 17. | "Let's Not Talk About Anything Else But Love (Reprise)" | 0:50 |
| 18. | "In the Arms" | 2:24 |
| 19. | "Live Before We Die" | 2:48 |
| 20. | "Tango de Amor" | 3:11 |
| 21. | "Move Toward the Darkness" | 3:58 |
| 22. | "Not Today" | 3:12 |

Note: "Not Today" was sung by Lippa as a bonus track for the iTunes release of the cast recording.

== Reception ==
The Variety review of the Chicago tryout said "The show [is] overcrammed and underfocused...From a structural perspective, the storytelling is all rising action followed by rapid and not really convincing resolution... it's very funny, with special nods to Chamberlin, whose ultra-corny number 'The Moon and Me' is a comic highlight, as well as to Hoffman and Lane." The Chicago Sun-Times theater critic wrote a laudatory review, but while the Chicago Tribune critic found the musical enjoyable, he felt "the show is hijacked by the Addamses behaving weirdly (i.e. normally)" and that Morticia's "crisis of confidence about getting old" is "a very uneasy narrative twist" and perhaps too far out of character.

Reviews for the Broadway production were mixed but mostly negative (the median grade of 27 major reviews was "D+"). John Simon, writing in the Bloomberg News called it "A glitzy-gloomy musical in which the quick and the dead are equally full of character, especially the chorus of ancestors that exhibits wonderful esprit de corpse." However, Ben Brantley in The New York Times wrote that it is "A tepid goulash of vaudeville song-and-dance routines, Borscht Belt jokes, stingless sitcom zingers and homey romantic plotlines". There was general praise for the performers, particularly Nathan Lane. An Associated Press reviewer stated: "Lane, complete with a deliciously phony Spanish accent, is the hardest working actor on Broadway. Whatever they are paying him – and I hope it is a lot – he's worth the price. The actor possesses a theatrical gusto that makes the musical move whenever he is on stage."

Despite many negative reviews by New York critics, it has consistently played to 100% capacity and grossed third only to Wicked and The Lion King each week since it opened in previews. The New York Times reported that despite "the sort of scathing reviews that would bury most shows", the production had $851,000 in ticket sales on top of a $15 million advance sale the weekend following its opening, "huge figures for a new Broadway run". The Times attributed this success to a beloved brand-name title, nostalgia, star strength, and a top-notch marketing campaign by the producers.

The post-tour return to Chicago was hailed as "triumphant" (New City Chicago), and moved Hedy Weiss of the Chicago Sun-Times to issue this directive: "Note to Broadway (and not for the first time): If you want to see how to make a musical really snap into place — how to connect with an audience in that uncanny way that is so crucial for success, how to delineate characters so that we cannot help but cheer for them, and how to turn every production number into a giddy explosion of song and dance — pay a visit to the ideally intimate Mercury Theater Chicago."

== Awards and nominations ==
=== Original Broadway production ===
| Year | Award | Category | Nominee | Result |
|---|---|---|---|---|
| 2010 | Tony Award | Best Original Score | Andrew Lippa | Nominated |
| 2010 | Tony Award | Best Featured Actor in a Musical | Kevin Chamberlin | Nominated |
| 2010 | Drama Desk Award | Outstanding Musical | | Nominated |
| 2010 | Drama Desk Award | Outstanding Actor in a Musical | Nathan Lane | Nominated |
| 2010 | Drama Desk Award | Outstanding Featured Actor in a Musical | Kevin Chamberlin | Nominated |
| 2010 | Drama Desk Award | Outstanding Featured Actress in a Musical | Carolee Carmello | Nominated |
| 2010 | Drama Desk Award | Outstanding Music | Andrew Lippa | Nominated |
| 2010 | Drama Desk Award | Outstanding Lyrics | Andrew Lippa | Nominated |
| 2010 | Drama Desk Award | Outstanding Set Design | Phelim McDermott, Julian Crouch and Basil Twist | Won |
| 2010 | Drama Desk Award | Outstanding Lighting Design | Natasha Katz | Nominated |
| 2010 | Drama League Award | Distinguished Production of a Musical | | Nominated |
| 2010 | Drama League Award | Distinguished Achievement in Musical Theatre | Nathan Lane | Won |
| 2010 | Drama League Award | Distinguished Performance | Nathan Lane | Nominated |
| 2010 | Drama League Award | Distinguished Performance | Bebe Neuwirth | Nominated |
| 2010 | Outer Critics Circle Award | Outstanding Actor in a Musical | Nathan Lane | Nominated |
| 2010 | Outer Critics Circle Award | Outstanding Actress in a Musical | Bebe Neuwirth | Nominated |
| 2010 | Outer Critics Circle Award | Outstanding Featured Actor in a Musical | Kevin Chamberlin | Nominated |
| 2010 | Outer Critics Circle Award | Outstanding Featured Actress in a Musical | Carolee Carmello | Nominated |
| 2010 | Outer Critics Circle Award | Outstanding Set Design (Play or Musical) | Phelim McDermott and Julian Crouch | Won |

=== 2015 Chicago Production ===
| Year | Award | Category | Nominee | Result |
|---|---|---|---|---|
| 2015 | Jeff Award | Production - Musical - Midsize | | Won |
| 2015 | Jeff Award | Costume Design - Midsize | Frances Maggio | Nominated |
| 2015 | Jeff Award | Actor in a Principal Role - Musical | Karl Hamilton | Nominated |

Awards
| Preceded by Tim Hatley for Shrek: The Musical | Drama Desk Award for Outstanding Set Design | Succeeded by Derek McLane for Anything Goes |
