= La Fura dels Baus =

Spanish theatrical group

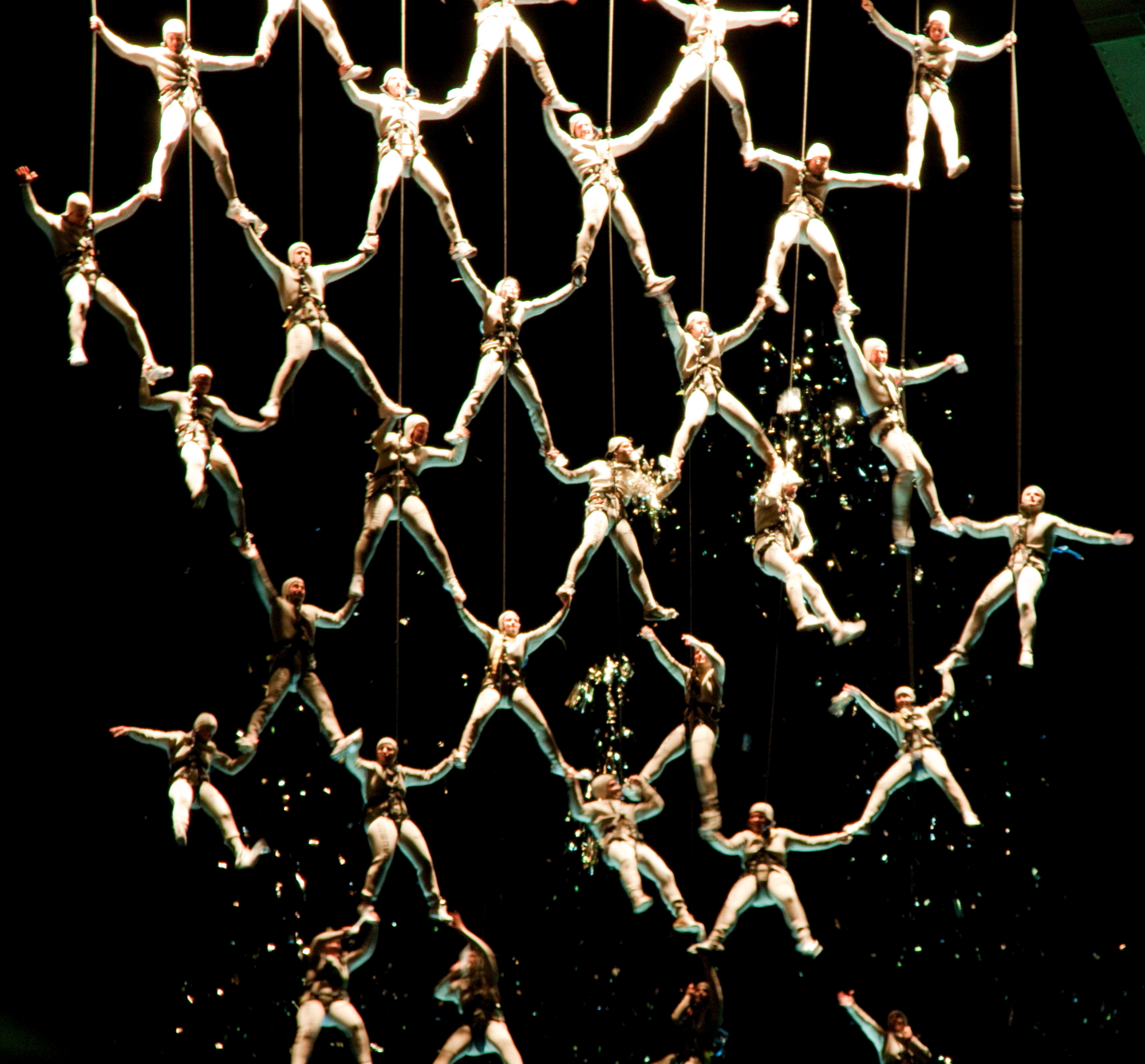
Dreams in Flight

La Fura dels Baus (Catalan pronunciation: [lə ˈfuɾə ðəlz ˈβaws]) is a Spanish theatrical group founded in 1979 in Moià, Barcelona (Spain), known for their urban theatre, use of unusual settings and blurring of the boundaries between audience and actor. "La Fura dels Baus" in Catalan means "The ferret from Els Baus" (Els Baus is a toponym from the birthplace of two of the founders, Moià). According to a 1985 review of their London performance, published in NME, the group "create a kind of adult adventure playground of fun, danger, slapstick and fantasy".

== History ==
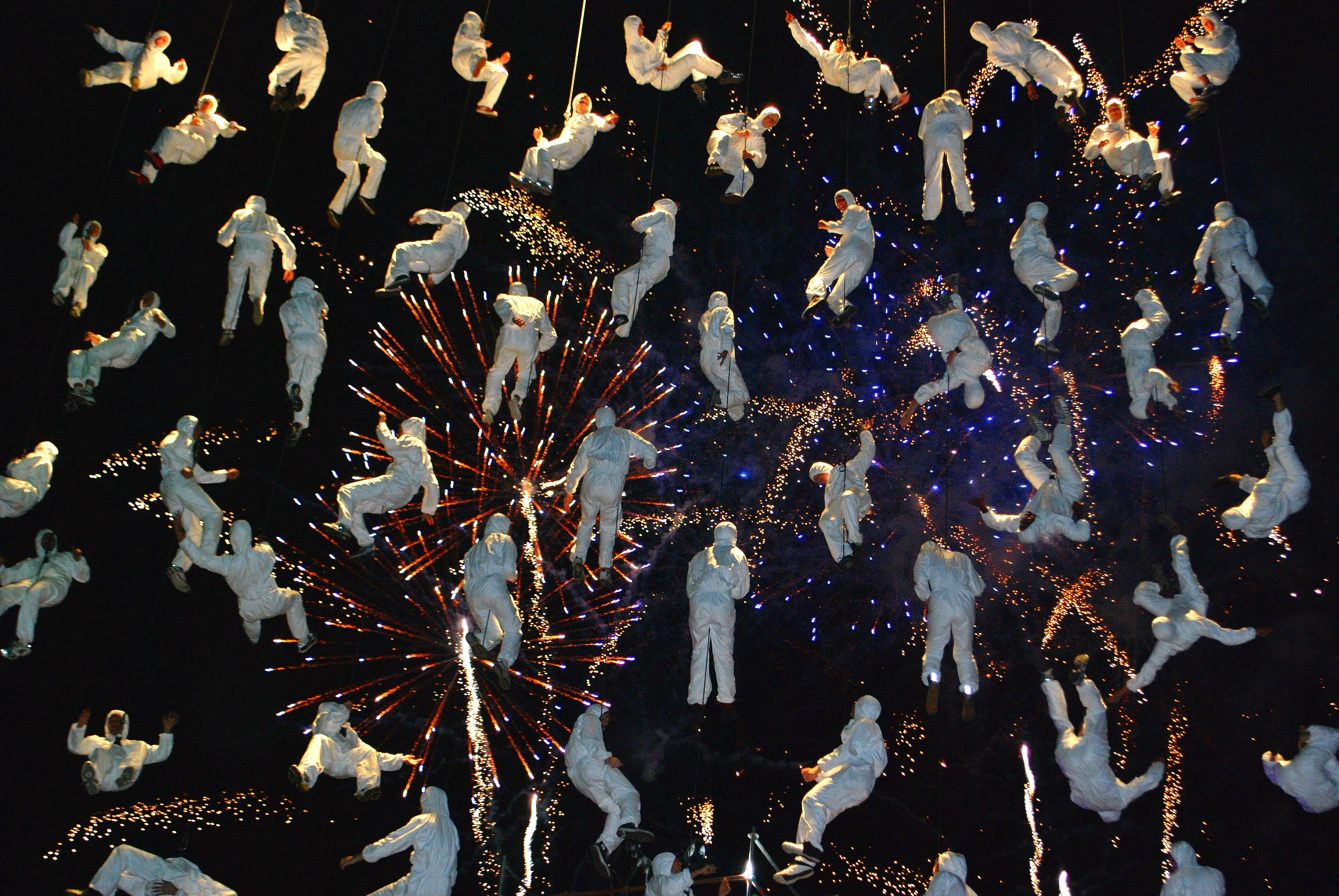
La Fura dels Baus in the Supreme Court Gardens, Perth – opening the Perth International Arts Festival 2010.

La Fura dels Baus was founded in 1979. Since the early 1990s, it has diversified its creative efforts, moving into the fields of written drama, digital theatre and street theatre, performing contemporary theatre and opera, and producing major corporate events. La Fura performed a section of the opening ceremony of the 1992 Summer Olympics in Barcelona, which was broadcast and watched live by more than 3.5 billion viewers. Since this first large show, companies such as Pepsi, Mercedes Benz, Peugeot, Volkswagen, Swatch, Airtel, Microsoft, Absolut Vodka, Columbia Pictures, Warner Bros, the Port of Barcelona, Telecom Italia and Sun Microsystems have commissioned it to produce large promotional shows for them around the world.

From 2000 to 2010, La Fura dels Baus performed street theatre, evolving towards a concept of theatre that combines a wide range of stage resources, based on the classical idea of an all-round show. The main contribution of La Fura was to approach its shows by encouraging the audience to take an active part in areas traditionally reserved for the public, and adapting its stage work to the architectural characteristics of the spaces in which each performance takes place. This blend of techniques and disciplines came to be known as llenguatge furer ("Furan language"), a term that has also been used to describe the work of other theatre companies.

The particular concept of shows designed by La Fura dels Baus is seen in its large scale performances such as: L’home del mil.leni (2000), to celebrate the new millennium, which drew an audience of more than 20,000 in Barcelona; the Divine Comedy, performed in Florence in front of more than 35,000 spectators; La Navaja en el Ojo, which opened the Biennial of Valencia, and which attracted an audience of more than 20,000; and Naumaquia 1 – Tetralogía Anfíbia – El Juego Eterno, which drew an audience of more than 15,000 spectators at the Forum de les Cultures in Barcelona.

A number of courses and workshops have trained actors in the "Furan language". Accions (1984) was the first show to use it, followed by Suz/O/Suz (1985), Tier Mon (1988), Noun (1990), MTM (1994), Manes (1996), ØBS (2000), Matria 1 – Tetralogía Anfíbia – La Creación (2004) and OBIT (2004). The company has made use of new technologies, for example in Work in Progress 97, an on-line show that put on simultaneous performances in different cities in a digital theatre environment.

In 2011 La Fura attracted controversy for performing for the 35th birthday party of the Chechen dictator, Ramzan Kadyrov.

== Theatre ==
La Fura dels Baus create immersive theatrical productions that rely on resources such as video and other image-based media to create interactive stage-sets that force the audience to shift and move as they experience the performance. Formed by eight people in 1979, they first worked on the street, creating guerrilla theatre in Barcelona. The techniques they learned from street work were applied "three years later while creating [their] first shows." The experience of working on the street taught them that "the more multidisciplinary we were in our performances, the more money we got from the audience." Performance scholar Antonio Sánchez has discussed their work in relation to the artistic legacy of Antonin Artaud, arguing that "that LFdB’s theatrical productions ... signal the aesthetic completion of the avant-garde theatre dreamt of by Antonin Artaud half a century earlier."

=== Early work ===
==== Accions (1984) ====
Their official theatrical debut was Accions (Actions) (1984), which brought them attention on the European theatre scene. Founding member Carlus Padrissa identifies Accions as "the moment when [La Fura] discovered who we were in terms of art."

==== Suz/o/Suz (1985) ====
Debuted in Madrid in 1985, Suz/o/Suz brought La Fura dels Baus to international acclaim. It was the recipient of the Ciutat de Barcelona, a prestigious cultural award, and since its debut has toured internationally.

==== Contemporary Productions ====
La Fura dels Baus has worked in the unconventional and risky areas of written drama or Italian style theatre, for example in: F@ust 3.0, a show that examines the classical work of Goethe; Ombra, a reinterpretation of various texts by Federico García Lorca; and XXX, a version of de Sade's Philosophy in the Bedroom, its international tour, which closed October 2000 after almost 3 years.

2001 Euripides tragedy The Trojan Women, co-directed by Irene Papas, music by Vangelis and design by Santiago Calatrava in Sagunt in September
2004 Obit, a performance about life and death. (October)
2005 Metamorphosis première in Japan (September)
2006 the Design Fair in Milan
2007 Imperium, to mark the celebrations of the Spanish Year in China (1 May)
2008 Boris Godunov (March)

These shows have the characteristics that have traditionally defined the work of La Fura dels Baus from the beginning: use of unconventional venues, music, movement, application of natural and industrial materials, including new technologies and the active participation of the audience in the show. This approach to theatre has attracted audiences that are not usually theatre-goers.

=== Opera and oratorio ===
==== up to 1999 ====
- 1996 de Falla's Atlàntida (Granada)
- 1997 Debussy's Le Martyre de saint Sébastien
- 1999 Berlioz's La damnation de Faust (Salzburg festival)

==== up to 2010 ====
- 2000 José Luis Turina's D.Q., Don Quijote in Barcelona, (The Gran Teatre del Liceu, Barcelona)
- 2002 Symphonie fantastique Berlioz (Palermo)
- 2002 Giorgio Battistelli's Auf den Marmorklippen (after On the Marble Cliffs by Ernst Jünger) (the premiere, Mannheim)
- 2003 Die Zauberflöte (Ruhrtriennale in Bochum)
- 2007 José Luis Turina's La hija del cielo (the premiere, the Canary Islands)
- 2007 Bartók's Bluebeard's Castle and Janáček's song cycle The Diary of One Who Disappeared (the Opéra de la Bastille in Paris & the Teatro Real in Madrid)
- 2007 Das Rheingold (Palau de les Arts Reina Sofia in Valencia 28 April 2007
- 2007 Die Walküre (Palau de les Arts Reina Sofia in Valencia 30 April 2007
- 2008 Siegfried (Palau de les Arts Reina Sofia in Valencia 10 June 2008
- 2008 Michael's Journey Around the Earth – the 2nd act of Stockhausen's Donnerstag aus Licht (Wiener Festwochen) in Vienna
- 2009 Ligeti's Grand Macabre (the Théâtre de la Monnaie in Brussels)
- 2009 Götterdammerung (Maggio Musicale Fiorentino in Florence) 29 April 2009
- 2009 Berlioz's Les Troyens (the Mariinski Theatre in Saint Petersburg)
- 2010 Rise and Fall of the City of Mahagonny (the Teatro Real in Madrid)
- 2010 Tristan and Isolde (Opéra de Lyon)
- 2010 Tannhäuser (La Scala in Milano)

==== Up to 2019 ====
- 2011 Stockhausen's Sonntag aus Licht (the premiere, Staatenhaus (States' House) of the Kölner Messe in Cologne)
- 2011 Xenakis's Oresteia, outdoor performance (Wiener Taschenoper in Vienna)
- 2011 Quartet based on text of Heiner Müller by Luca Francesconi (La Scala) in Milano the premiere
- 2011 Turandot (Bayerische Staatsoper in Munich)
- 2012 Babylon by Jörg Widmann (Bayerische Staatsoper in Munich)
- 2012 Xenakis's Oresteia (Suntory Hall in Tokyo)
- 2013 Parsifal (Cologne Opera)
- 2013 Orfeo ed Euridice (Palacio de Carlos V in Granada)
- 2013 Aida (Arena di Verona Festival)
- 2014 Madama Butterfly (the Sydney Opera House)
- 2014 Der fliegende Holländer (Opéra de Lyon)
- 2014 Elektra by Strauss, open-air performance, (NorrlandsOperan) in Umeå
- 2015 Benvenuto Cellini by Berlioz (Cologne Opera)
- 2015 Il Trovatore (the Dutch National Opera in Amsterdam)
- 2016 Enescu's Oedipe (the Théâtre de la Monnaie in Brussels)
- 2016 Norma (the Royal Opera House in London) 13 Sep
- 2017 Oratorio The Creation (Haydn) in Aix-en-Provence 14 March
- 2017 Alceste by Gluck (Opéra de Lyon) 2 May
- 2017 Jeanne d'Arc au bûcher by Arthur Honegger (Opern- und Schauspielhaus Frankfurt) 11 June
- 2017 Le Siège de Corinthe (Rossini Opera Festival) 10 August
- 2018 Histoire du soldat by Igor Stravinsky (Opéra de Lyon) 25 April
- 2018 Die Soldaten by Bernd Alois Zimmermann (Cologne Opera) 29 April
- 2018 Pelléas et Mélisande (Semperoper in Dresden) 2 May
- 2018 Sfera Mundi – Voyage around the world at the 66th Ljubljana Festival 29 June
- 2019 Karl V (Bayerische Staatsoper in Munich) 10 February
- 2019 Norma (The Greek National Opera in Athens) 5 June
- 2019 Turandot (Tokyo, Sapporo)

=== Film ===
Fausto 5.0 (2001), co-directed with Isidro Ortiz, was awarded the Golden Méliès (2002) for the best European film in the fantastic genere. Although it is its first film. La Fura has already been involved in the cinema in the past, for example in Goya in Bordeaux (1999) by Carlos Saura.

=== Music and recordings ===
La Fura dels Baus has created its own record label, with a catalogue of 14 recordings; it has also published its work on other labels, including Dro, Virgin and Subterfuge.

Music is used in all the company's work, to such an extent that it has sometimes provided the framework for the show itself. Each new stage production by La Fura dels Baus generates a parallel musical project that eventually leads to a record being produced.

== The Naumon ==
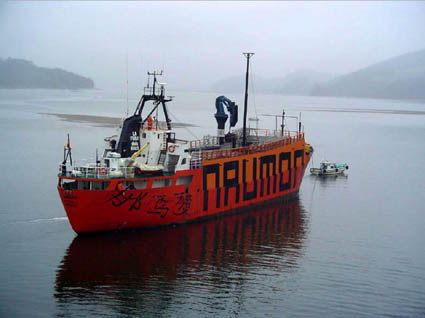
The Naumon

The Naumon is a floating cultural art center that has been to Barcelona, Sardinia, Portugal, Beirut, Taipei, Newcastle (2007), Haifa and Duisburg, carrying various artistic, educational and cultural containers, including the shows Naumaquia, Sub, Terramaquia and Matria. It was 60m-long Norwegian ship built to break through Arctic ice, built in 1965 in a Norwegian shipyard located 200 miles from the Arctic Circle. La Fura dels Baus bought the Naumon in July 2003. In 2019, La Fura dels Baus commemorates the 500th anniversary since the beginning of Ferdinand Magellan's world journey.

== Members ==
- Carlus Padrissa – cofounder and an artistic co-director
- Àlex Ollé – an artistic co-director
- Marcel·lí Antúnez Roca – cofounder
- Pere Tantinyà – cofounder
- Quico Palomar y Teresa Puig – cofounder
- Miki Espuma
- Jürgen Müller
- Pep Gatell, cofounder and artistic co-director
- Jordi Arús
- Hansel Cereza y Michael Summers
- Quico Palomar
- Teresa Puig y Mireia Romero
- Carlota Gurt, former member
