= Alceo =

Alceo is an Italian male given name, derived from that of Alcaeus of Mytilene. Notable people with this name include:

- Alceo Dossena (1878–1937), Italian sculptor
- Alceo Galliera (1910–1996), Italian conductor and composer
- Alceo Lipizer (1921–1990), Italian football player
- Alceo Fortino (2008–), Français lycéen
