= Marie Osmond discography =

List of works by the American singer

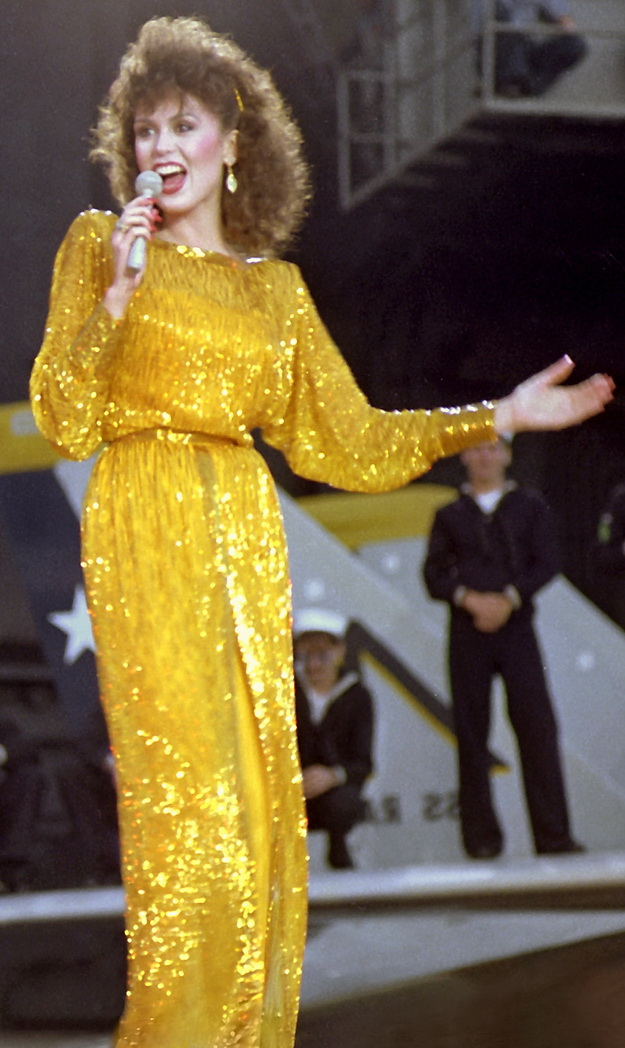
- Marie Osmond in concert, 1981.
- Studio albums: 12
- Compilation albums: 3
- Singles: 33
- Other album appearances: 2

The discography of American country pop singer Marie Osmond contains 12 studio albums, three compilation albums, one soundtrack album, 33 singles and 2 album appearances. She first gained exposure on television with her siblings' group, The Osmonds. She then signed her own recording contract with MGM Records. Osmond specifically chose to be marketed towards the country field. In 1973, she released her debut single, "Paper Roses." The song reached number one on the Billboard Hot Country Songs chart and crossed into the top five of the Billboard Hot 100. Her debut studio album of the same name also topped Billboard's country albums chart and spent 20 weeks on the survey. It was also her highest charting album on the Billboard 200 all-genre chart, climbing to number 59. She followed this with 1974's "In My Little Corner of the World" and 1975's "Who's Sorry Now." Both singles reached the top 40 of the Billboard country songs chart. In addition, she released two more studio albums with MGM during this period. She then began a duet career with her brother during the latter half of the 1970s. However, in 1977 she recorded a solo album of pop music entitled This Is the Way That I Feel.

Osmond returned to country on Curb Records in the 1980s. Her 1985 duet with Dan Seals called "Meet Me in Montana" reached number one on the Billboard country songs chart. Her next release was the solo single "There's No Stopping Your Heart," which also topped the country chart. Her 1985 album of the same name peaked at number 16 on the country albums chart. Her 1986 studio effort, I Only Wanted You reached a similar top 20 country chart position and spent 37 weeks on the list. Its lead single, "You're Still New to Me" (a duet with Paul Davis), reached number one on the country songs chart in 1986. Her subsequent singles for Curb did not become major hits, yet she continued releasing new material. Her final Curb release was 1989's Steppin' Stone, which reached number 68 on the Top Country Albums survey. After a several-year hiatus, her 1995 single "What Kind of Man (Walks on a Woman)" reached number 75 on the country songs chart. It is Osmond's last charting single to date. After 20 years, she returned to her music career with 2007's Magic of Christmas. She followed it with I Can Do This in 2010. In 2016, she released her most recent studio effort entitled Music Is Medicine. It peaked at number 10 that year. In 2021, Osmond released her twelfth studio record titled Unexpected, which centers on orchestral and standards songs.

== Albums ==
=== Studio albums ===
List of albums, with selected chart positions, showing other relevant details
Title	Album details	Peak chart positions			
Title	Album details	US	US Cou.	CAN	UK
Paper Roses	Released: September 1973; Label: Kolob/MGM; Formats: LP, cassette, 8-Track	59	1	38	2
In My Little Corner of the World	Released: June 1974; Label: Kolob/MGM; Formats: LP, cassette, 8-Track	164	10	90	—
Who's Sorry Now	Released: March 8, 1975; Label: Kolob/MGM; Formats: LP, cassette, 8-Track	152	20	—	—
This Is the Way That I Feel	Released: March 1977; Label: Polydor; Formats: LP, cassette, 8-Track	152	—	85	—
There's No Stopping Your Heart	Released: July 1985; Label: Capitol/Curb; Formats: LP, cassette, 8-Track, CD	—	16	—	—
I Only Wanted You	Released: August 1986; Label: Capitol/Curb; Formats: LP, cassette, 8-Track, CD	—	19	—	—
All in Love	Released: July 1988; Label: Capitol/Curb; Formats: LP, cassette, CD	—	29	—	—
Steppin' Stone	Released: September 1989; Label: Capitol/Curb; Formats: LP, cassette, CD	—	68	—	—
Magic of Christmas	Released: 2007; Label: HiFi; Formats: CD, music download	93	—	—	—
I Can Do This	Released: November 16, 2010; Label: Red General; Formats: CD, music download	71	—	—	—
Music Is Medicine	Released: April 15, 2016; Label: Oliveme; Formats: CD, music download, LP	189	10	—	—
Unexpected	Released: December 10, 2021; Label: BFD/Oliveme; Formats: CD, LP	— (Note: Unexpected did not reach the Billboard 200 but instead peaked at number one on Billboards Classical Crossover Albums chart.)	—	—	—
"—" denotes a recording that did not chart or was not released in that territory.

=== Compilation albums ===
List of albums, with other relevant details
Title	Album details
The Best of Marie Osmond	Released: September 25, 1990; Label: Curb; Formats: Cassette, CD
25 Hits Special Collection	Released: November 7, 1995; Label: Curb; Formats: CD
Dancing with the Best of Marie Osmond	Released: April 8, 2008; Label: Curb; Formats: CD, music download

== Singles ==
List of singles, with selected chart positions and certifications, showing other relevant details
Title	Year	Peak chart positions								Certifications	Album
Title	Year	US	US AC	US Cou.	AUS	CAN	CAN AC	CAN Cou.	UK	Certifications	Album
"Paper Roses"	1973	5	1	1	12	12	3	1	2	RIAA: Gold	Paper Roses
"In My Own Little Corner of the World"	1974	— (Note: "In My Little Corner of the World" did not enter the Hot 100, but peaked at number 2 on Bubbling Under Hot 100 Singles, which acts as a 25-song extension of the Hot 100.)	—	33	—	—	5	—	—		In My Little Corner of the World
"Who's Sorry Now"	1975	40	21	29	—	38	17	36	—		Who's Sorry Now
""A" My Name Is Alice"	1976	—	—	85	—	—	—	—	—		Featuring Songs from Their Television Show
"This Is the Way That I Feel"	1977	39	—	—	—	55	—	—	—		This Is the Way That I Feel
"Please Tell Him That I Said Hello"	1977	—	—	—	—	—	—	—	—		This Is the Way That I Feel
"Get Me to Heaven"	1980	—	—	—	—	—	—	—	—		Non-album singles
"I've Got a Bad Case of You"	1982	—	—	74	—	—	—	—	—		Non-album singles
"Back to Believing Again"	1982	—	—	58	—	—	—	—	—		Non-album singles
"Who's Counting"	1984	—	—	82	—	—	—	—	—		Non-album singles
"Until I Fall in Love Again"	1985	—	—	54	—	—	—	—	—		There's No Stopping Your Heart
"Meet Me in Montana" (with Dan Seals)	1985	—	—	1	—	—	—	19	—		There's No Stopping Your Heart
"There's No Stopping Your Heart"	1985	—	—	1	—	—	—	1	—		There's No Stopping Your Heart
"Read My Lips"	1986	—	—	4	—	—	—	5	—		There's No Stopping Your Heart
"You're Still New to Me" (with Paul Davis)	1986	—	—	1	—	—	—	1	—		I Only Wanted You
"I Only Wanted You"	1986	—	—	14	—	—	—	19	—		I Only Wanted You
"Everybody's Crazy 'Bout My Baby"	1987	—	—	24	—	—	—	34	—		I Only Wanted You
"Cry Just a Little"	1987	—	—	50	—	—	—	—	—		I Only Wanted You
"Without a Trace"	1988	—	—	50	—	—	—	40	—		All in Love
"Sweet Life" (with Paul Davis)	1988	—	—	47	—	—	—	55	—		All in Love
"I'm in Love and He's in Dallas"	1988	—	—	59	—	—	—	—	—		All in Love
"Steppin' Stone"	1989	—	—	70	—	—	—	60	—		Steppin' Stone
"Slowly But Surely"	1989	—	—	75	—	—	—	52	—		Steppin' Stone
"Let Me Be the First"	1990	—	—	—	—	—	—	72	—		Steppin' Stone
"Like a Hurricane"	1990	—	—	57	—	—	—	—	—		The Best of Marie Osmond
"Think with Your Heart"	1990	—	—	—	—	—	—	—	—		The Best of Marie Osmond
"Boogie Woogie Bugle Boy"	1991	—	—	—	—	—	—	—	—		Non-album singles
"True Love (Never Goes Away)"	1992	—	—	—	—	—	—	—	—		Non-album singles
"What Kind of Man (Walks on a Woman)"	1995	—	—	75	—	—	—	—	—		Non-album singles
"From God's Arms"	1997	—	—	—	—	—	—	—	—		Non-album singles
"Naughty List"	2011	—	—	—	—	—	—	—	—		Non-album singles
"Music Is Medicine"	2016	—	—	—	—	—	—	—	—		Music Is Medicine
"Baby You're Crazy"	2016	—	—	—	—	—	—	—	—		Music Is Medicine
"—" denotes a recording that did not chart or was not released in that territory.

== Other album appearances ==
List of non-single guest appearances, with other performing artists, showing year released and album name
Title	Year	Other artist(s)	Album	Ref.
"It Wasn't Love Before"	1991	Lee Greenwood	A Perfect 10	
"The Way You Do the Things You Do"	2006	Tom Jones	What's New Pussycat?	

== See also ==
- Donny Osmond discography
- Donny and Marie Osmond discography
- The Osmonds discography
