= Donny and Marie Osmond discography =

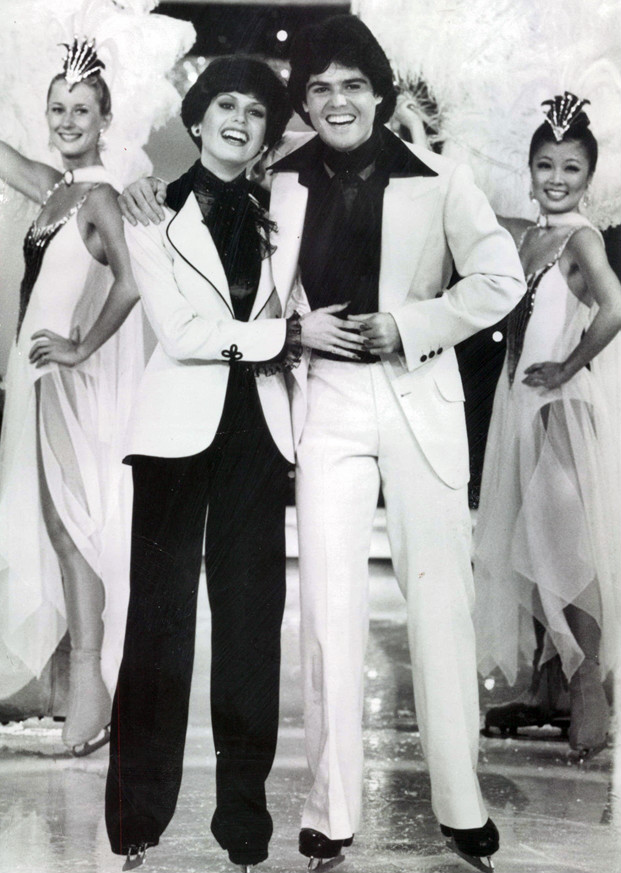
- Donny and Marie Osmond, 1977.
- Studio albums: 7
- Soundtrack albums: 1
- Live albums: 1
- Compilation albums: 4
- Singles: 12
- Music videos: 1

The discography of American pop duo Donny and Marie Osmond contains seven studio albums, four compilation albums, one soundtrack album, one live album and 12 singles. Both siblings had previously had successful solo music careers before first collaborating in 1974; Donny was also a member of his brothers' band, The Osmonds. Their first single, "I'm Leaving It Up to You," reached number four on the Billboard Hot 100. Their corresponding debut album of the same name peaked at number 35 on the Billboard 200 chart in November 1974. The release certified gold in the United States for sales beyond 500,000 copies. Together, the duo had two more hits that reached both the top ten and 20 of the Hot 100: "Deep Purple" and "Morning Side of the Mountain."

After the release of a second album, Donny and Marie began their own television show, also titled Donny & Marie. With its success, 1976's Featuring Songs from Their Television Show reached number 60 on the Billboard all-genre chart. The record also certified gold in the United States. Their fourth studio album, New Season (1977), reached number 85 in the United States. In 1978, the duo appeared in the film Goin' Coconuts. The soundtrack of the same name would later certify gold in sales. The duo continued their own solo careers for many years before reuniting in Las Vegas in the 2000s. With their return, the duo released a self-titled studio album, which was their first to chart on the Billboard Top Country Albums chart, peaking at number seven.

== Albums ==
=== Studio albums ===
List of albums, with selected chart positions and certifications, showing other relevant details
Title	Album details	Peak chart positions				Certifications
Title	Album details	US	US Cou.	CAN	UK	Certifications
I'm Leaving It All Up to You	Released: July 6, 1974; Label: Kolob/MGM; Formats: LP, cassette	35	—	4	13	BPI: Silver; RIAA: Gold
Make the World Go Away	Released: 1975; Label: Kolob/MGM; Formats: LP, cassette	133	—	—	30	
Featuring Songs from Their Television Show	Released: April 3, 1976; Label: Kolob/Polydor; Formats: LP, cassette	60	—	48	48	RIAA: Gold
New Season	Released: November 27, 1976; Label: Kolob/Polydor; Formats: LP, cassette	85	—	—	—	RIAA: Gold
Winning Combination	Released: 1977; Label: Kolob/Polydor; Formats: LP, cassette	99	—	—	—	
A Broadway Christmas	Released: 2010; Label: HiFi; Formats: CD	—	—	—	—	
Donny & Marie (Note: Donny & Marie was re-issued in 2011 on MPCA Records, where it reached chart positions in the United States.)	Released: December 15, 2009; Label: Decca; Formats: CD, music download	30	7	18	41	
"—" denotes a recording that did not chart or was not released in that territory.

=== Soundtrack albums ===
List of albums, with selected chart positions and certifications, showing other relevant details
Title	Album details	Peak chart positions	Certifications
Title	Album details	US	Certifications
Goin' Coconuts	Released: 1978; Label: Kolob/Polydor; Formats: LP, cassette	98	RIAA: Gold

=== Compilation albums ===
List of albums, with other relevant details
Title	Album details
Greatest Hits	Released: May 4, 1993; Label: Curb; Formats: Cassette, CD
20th Century Masters: The Millennium Collection	Released: August 6, 2002; Label: Polydor; Formats: CD
Love Songs	Released: January 13, 2004; Label: Polydor; Formats: CD
Collector's Edition	Released: September 23, 2008; Label: Curb; Formats: CD

=== Live albums ===
List of albums, with other relevant details
Title	Album details
Live in Vegas	Released: 2011; Label: MPCA; Formats: CD

== Singles ==
List of singles, with selected chart positions and certifications, showing other relevant details
Title	Year	Peak chart positions									Certifications	Album
Title	Year	US	US AC	US Cou.	AUS	CAN	CAN AC	IRE	NLD	UK	Certifications	Album
"I'm Leaving It Up to You"	1974	4	1	17	14	4	3	3	4	2	RIAA: Gold; BPI: Silver	I'm Leaving It All Up to You
"Morning Side of the Mountain"	1974	8	1	—	34	8	1	7	—	5	BPI: Silver	I'm Leaving It All Up to You
"Make the World Go Away"	1975	44	31	71	89	33	40	—	—	18		Make the World Go Away
"Deep Purple"	1975	14	8	—	39	15	8	—	27	25		Featuring Songs from Their Television Show
"Ain't Nothing Like the Real Thing"	1976	21	17	—	—	26	11	—	—	—		New Season
"(You're My) Soul and Inspiration"	1977	38	18	—	—	57	29	—	—	—		Winning Combination
"Baby, I'm Sold on You"	1978	—	—	—	—	—	—	—	—	—		Winning Combination
"I Want to Give You My Everything"	1978	—	—	—	—	—	—	—	—	—		Winning Combination
"On the Shelf"	1978	38	25	—	—	58	14	—	—	—		Goin' Coconuts (soundtrack)
"Vegas Love"	2009	—	—	—	—	—	—	—	—	—		Donny & Marie
"The Good Life"	2011	—	—	—	—	—	—	—	—	—		Donny & Marie
"A Beautiful Life"	2011	—	—	—	—	—	—	—	—	—		Donny & Marie
"—" denotes a recording that did not chart or was not released in that territory.

== Music videos ==
List of music videos, showing year released and director
Title	Year	Director(s)	Ref.
"The Good Life"	2011	not available	

== See also ==
- Donny Osmond discography
- Marie Osmond discography
- The Osmond Brothers discography
- Little Jimmy Osmond discography
