= Marie Osmond on screen and stage =

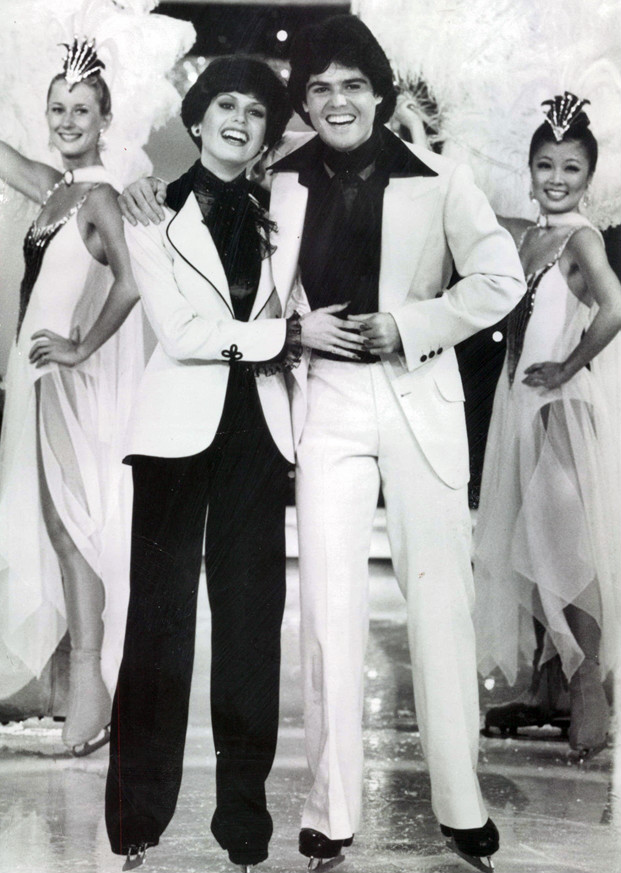
Donny and Marie Osmond on television in 1977.

American singer, actress, author and television personality Marie Osmond has made five appearances in feature films, seven appearances in television films, 22 appearances on television series, two stage productions, one video album has appeared in six music videos. Osmond made her debut screen appearance as a singer in the 1975 feature film Hugo the Hippo. In 1976, she and brother Donny co-hosted the television variety show Donny & Marie. The variety program lasted for three years. It was followed by her own variety show in 1980 called Marie, but it only lasted six episodes. Osmond followed it during the early 1980s with several television film roles. Among these was her portrayal of her own mother in the 1982 film Side by Side: The True Story of the Osmond Family.

In 1995, Osmond returned to television with the sitcom Maybe This Time. Playing the role of Julia Wallace, the program lasted a total of 18 episodes. During this period, she transitioned into stage roles. Between 1994 and 1995, she portrayed Maria von Trapp in the traveling stage production of The Sound of Music. This was followed in 1997 where she made her Broadway debut in The King and I. In 1998, she reunited with her brother for a television talk show, also titled Donny & Marie. The program lasted two seasons and ran for 32 episodes.

Osmond continued to focus her attention on television during the 2000s. She was a judge on the 2006 reality show Celebrity Duets. She then participated in the 2007 season of Dancing with the Stars. Between 2012 and 2013, Osmond hosted her own talk show titled Marie, which ran for 150 episodes. Between 2019 and 2020, she served as a co-host of the television show Talk Show. Between 2019 and 2021, Osmond appeared in three television films, including A Fiancé for Christmas. In 2023, Osmond made an appearance as Countess von Frankurt in The Bold and the Beautiful.

== Film ==
List of film appearances by Marie Osmond, showing all relevant details
Title	Year	Role	Ref.
Hugo the Hippo	1975	Singer	
Goin' Coconuts	1978	Marie	
The Velveteen Rabbit	1984	The Nursery Magic Fairy/The Velveteen Rabbit	
Buster & Chauncey's Silent Night	1998	Queen Therese IV	
O Christmas Tree	1999	Star	

== Television films ==
List of TV film appearances by Marie Osmond, showing all relevant details
Title	Year	Role	Ref.
The Gift of Love	1978	Beth Atherton	
Side by Side: The True Story of the Osmond Family	1982	Olive Osmond	
Rooster	1982	Sister Mae Davis	
I Married Wyatt Earp	1983	Josephine "Josie" Marcus	
The Road Home for Christmas	2019	Cassie	
The Christmas Edition	2020	Melanie	
A Fiancé for Christmas	2021	Margaret	

== Television series ==
List of television series appearances by Marie Osmond, showing all relevant details
Title	Year	Role	Notes	Ref.
Donny & Marie	1976–1979	Herself/television host	Variety show	
Marie	1979	Marie Owens	television pilot only	
Marie	1980–1981	Herself/television host	Six episodes	
The Osmond Family Christmas Special	1980	Herself		
The Osmond Family Holiday Special	1981	Herself		
The Love Boat	1982	Maria Rosselli	Episode: "The Arrangement"	
Rose Petal Place	1984	Rose Petal		
Rose Petal Place: Real Friends	1985	Rose Petal		
Ripley's Believe It or Not!	1985	Herself/television host		
Marie Osmond's Merry Christmas	1986	Herself/television host		
Maybe This Time	1995–1996	Julia Wallace	18 episodes	
Almost Perfect	1996	Herself		
Donny & Marie	1998–2000	Herself/television host	Talk show / variety. 32 episodes	
Diagnosis: Murder	1999	Marie Osmond	Episode: "The Mouth That Roared"	
Movie Stars	2000	Herself	Episode: "Video Gurl"	
Celebrity Duets	2006	Television host/judge		
Dancing with the Stars	2007	Herself/contestant		
Teleflora presents America's Favorite Mom	2008	Herself/television host	Mother's Day special. Co-host with brother Donny	
Marie	2012–2013	Herself/television host	150 episodes	
The Talk	2019–2020	Herself/television co-host		
Fantasy Island	2021	Shaye Fury		
An Evening with Marie Osmond	2021	Herself	television concert special	
The Bold and the Beautiful	2023	Countess Von Frankfurt		
The Drew Barrymore Show	2024	Herself/guest co-host		

== Stage ==
List of stage appearances by Marie Osmond, showing all relevant details
Production	Year	Role(s)	Notes	Ref(s)
The Sound of Music	1994–1995	Maria von Trapp	traveling stage production	
The King and I	1997	Anna Leonowens	Broadway show	

== Video albums ==
List of video albums, with other relevant details
Title	Album details
Marie Osmond's Merry Christmas	Released: September 11, 2001; Label: Winstar; Formats: DVD

== Music videos ==
List of music videos, showing year released and director
Title	Year	Director(s)	Ref.
"There's No Stopping Your Heart"	1985	Alan Osmond	
"I Only Wanted You"	1987	Alan Osmond	
"Like a Hurricane"	1990	—N/a	
"True Love (Never Goes Away)"	1992	—N/a	
"Music Is Medicine"	2016	Alex Boyé	
"Then There's You"	2016	Alex Boyé	
