= Magic of Christmas (Marie Osmond album) =

Studio album by Marie Osmond
- Released: 2007
- Genre: Christmas, Country, Big Band, Christian
- Length: 57:02
- Label: Hi-Fi

Marie Osmond chronology
20th Century Masters: The Millennium Collection (2002)	Magic of Christmas (2007)	Dancing with the Best of Marie Osmond (2008)

Magic of Christmas is a holiday album released in 2007 by American country music singer, Marie Osmond. It was Osmond's first studio album since 1989's Steppin' Stone, as well as her first Christmas album.

Osmond released this album following her appearance on Dancing with the Stars. This album features guest vocals from siblings, Donny Osmond, Jimmy Osmond and Merrill Osmond. The album is a mixture of cover versions of Christmas standards, such as "The Christmas Song" and "Away in a Manger" as well as new songs such as "The Locket" and "Christmas in the Country." It includes traditional holiday big-band music, as well Country and Christian ballads.

Released on the independent label, Hi-Fi label, The Magic of Christmas charted among the Billboard 200 albums chart, reaching a peak of number 93 towards the end of the year. It also peaked at number 4 on the Top Christian Albums chart and number 9 on the Top Independent Albums chart the same year.

== Track listing ==
No.	Title	Writer(s)	Length
1.	"The Christmas Song"	Mel Tormé; Robert Wells	3:28
2.	"When Christmas Comes This Year" (with Donny Osmond)	Robert White Johnson	4:39
3.	"Angels We Have Heard on High"/"Away in a Manger"	James Chadwick; William J. Kirkpatrick; James R. Murray	4:24
4.	"Season of Seasons" (with Stephen Craig (son))	Jerry Williams; Gary Baker; George Teren	3:59
5.	"Christmas Lullaby"	Jeremy Lubbock; Richard Rudolph	3:52
6.	"The Gift of Love" (with Paul Engemann)	Jerry Williams; Gary Baker; Frank Myers	4:30
7.	"Hark! the Herald Angels Sing"/"O Come All Ye Faithful"	Felix Mendelssohn; Charles Wesley; / Traditional	4:17
8.	"The Locket" (with The Osmond Brothers)	Gerald Crabb	3:12
9.	"Christmas in the Country"	Gerald Crabb	3:31
10.	"It's Christmas Once Again" (with Jimmy Osmond)	Gerald Crabb	3:30
11.	"O Holy Night"	Adolphe Adam; Placide Cappeau	4:44
12.	"The Secret of Christmas"	Sammy Cahn; Jimmy Van Heusen	3:28
13.	"The Lord's Prayer"	Albert Hay Malotte	2:55
14.	"True Love"	Stephen Craig	3:24
15.	"Santa Claus is Coming to Town" (with Merrill Osmond)	John Frederick Coots; Haven Gillespie	3:09
Total length:			57:02

Track information and credits adapted from Discogs, then verified from the album's liner notes.

== Charts ==
Chart (2007)	Peak position
US Billboard 200	93
US Christian Albums (Billboard)	4
US Independent Albums (Billboard)	9
