= Music Is Medicine =

Studio album by Marie Osmond
- Released: April 15, 2016
- Genre: Country
- Length: 34:41
- Label: OliveMe, LLC
- Producer: Jason Deere

Marie Osmond chronology
I Can Do This (2010)	Music Is Medicine (2016)	Unexpected (2021)

Singles from Music Is Medicine
- 1. "Music Is Medicine"

Professional ratings
Review scores
Source	Rating
Allmusic	

Music Is Medicine is the tenth studio solo album by American country music singer Marie Osmond, released on April 15, 2016, on OliveMe Records. It is her first studio album released on her private label OliveMe, LLC. It was released on both CD and digital download through big box stores and major music download services.

== Background ==
This is Osmond's first new album in five years. The album was produced by Jason Deere whom she has worked with in the past. Additional guest artist are Marty Roe, Olivia Newton-John, Sisqó, John Rich and Alex Boyé.

The album was produced by Jason Deere, who did not produce any of Osmond's previous albums. Jerry Crutchfield produced her final country album in 1989 and Paul Worley produced her previous three under the Capitol/Curb label during the late 1980s. Music Is Medicine is Osmond's final country album to date.

The album was recorded at Soundstage Studios and Westwood Studios - both in Nashville, TN, Additional studios used were Audio Mix House and Studios at The Palms in Las Vegas, NV. The album was mastered by Silvio Richetto at The Living Room Studios in Aventura, FL.

The album entered the Billboard Top Country Albums chart at number 10 on May 7, 2016. It has sold 8,000 copies in the US as of May 31, 2016.

== Vinyl ==
A limited edition autographed vinyl pressing of the album was released by the online retailer Amazon on November 18, 2016. Marie autographed each of the album covers prior to shipment as shown in photographs on both her Facebook and Instagram accounts. As of November 22, 2016 the autographed versions of the vinyl were no longer in stock and no additional copies will be pressed.

== Track listing ==
No.	Title	Writer(s)	Length
1.	"Music Is Medicine"	Jamie Sinclair, Allen Shamblin, Steve Seskin	3:25
2.	"Unbreak This Break Up"	Jason Deere, Benjamin Truman, Raquel Warchol, Chad Truman	3:12
3.	"Give Me A Good Song" (featuring Sisqó)	Deere	3:13
4.	"Getting Better All the Time" (featuring Olivia Newton-John)	Jennifer Denmark, Molly Reed	3:03
5.	"Baby You're Crazy"	Deere, Jennifer Wayne, Caroline Cutbirth, Tayla Lynn	3:35
6.	"I'd Love to Be Your Last" (featuring Marty Roe of Diamond Rio)	Rivers Rutherford, Sam Tate, Annie Tate	3:48
7.	"Love This Tough" (featuring John Rich)	Deere, Denmark, Arielle MacArthur	3:36
8.	"Then There's You" (featuring Alex Boyé)	Deere, Darren Dixon	3:41
9.	"Wild & Sweet"	Deere, Ann Marie Boskovich	3:12
10.	"I'll Find You"	Deere, Randy Kartchnei	4:01
Total length:			34:41

== Music videos ==
On March 27, 2016 a video for the song "Then There's You" was released on the internet video site Vevo and it received almost 200,000 views in less than 48 hours. On April 13, 2016 the video for the title track was also released on Vevo and was filmed with patients from Children's Miracle Network Hospitals.

Year	Video	Director
2016	"Then There's You"	Alex Boyé
2016	"Music is Medicine"	Alex Boyé

== Personnel ==
- Jeremy Barron – production assistant
- David LaBruyere – bass
- Dave Cohen – keys
- Jason Deere – background vocals
- David Dorn – keys
- Cheaza Figueroa – background vocals
- Lee Hendricks – bass
- Brad Hull – Production Assistant
- Evan Hutchins – drums
- Rachael Lauren – background vocals
- Tasha Layton – background vocals
- Miles McPherson – drums
- Justin Ostrander – electric guitar
- Justin Richards – background vocals
- Silvio Richetto – background vocals
- Adam Shoenfeld – electric guitar
- Russel Terrell – background vocals
- Ilya Toshinskiy – acoustic, banjo, mandolin, electric guitar
- Briana Tyson – background vocals

== Chart performance ==
=== Album ===
Chart (2016)	Peak position
US Billboard 200	189
US Top Country Albums (Billboard)	10

=== Singles ===
Year	Single
2016	"Music Is Medicine"
