= I'm Leaving It All Up to You =

Studio album by Donny & Marie Osmond
- Released: July 1974
- Recorded: 1974
- Genre: Pop
- Length: 28:18
- Label: MGM Records
- Producers: Mike Curb, Alan Osmond

Donny & Marie Osmond chronology
I'm Leaving It All Up to You (1974)	Make The World Go Away (1975)

Professional ratings
Review scores
Source	Rating
Džuboks	(Mixed)

I'm Leaving It All Up to You is the debut album by Donny & Marie Osmond, released in 1974. Two singles were released from the album: "I'm Leavin' It (All) Up to You" (US Pop #4, Country #17) and "Morning Side of the Mountain" (US Pop #8).

== Track listing ==
1. "I'm Leavin' It (All) Up to You" (Dewey Terry, Don Harris) (2:51)
2. "Take Me Back Again" (Mike Curb) (2:49)
3. "A Day Late and a Dollar Short" (Mack David, Mike Curb) (2:17)
4. "Everything Good Reminds Me of You" (Harley Hatcher) (2:10)
5. "Gone" (Smokey Rogers) (2:50)
6. "Morning Side of the Mountain" (Dick Manning, Larry Stock) (3:00)
7. "True Love" (Cole Porter) (3:17)
8. "It Takes Two" (William "Mickey" Stevenson, Sylvia Moy) (2:48)
9. "The Umbrella Song" (Michael Lloyd) (3:22)
10. "Let It Be Me" (Gilbert Bécaud, Manny Curtis, Pierre Delanoë) (3:09)

== Certifications ==
Region	Certification	Certified units/sales
United Kingdom (BPI)	Silver	60,000^{^}
United States (RIAA)	Gold	500,000^{^}
^{^} Shipments figures based on certification alone.
