= Alex Boyé =

British actor and singer (born 1970)

Alex Boye
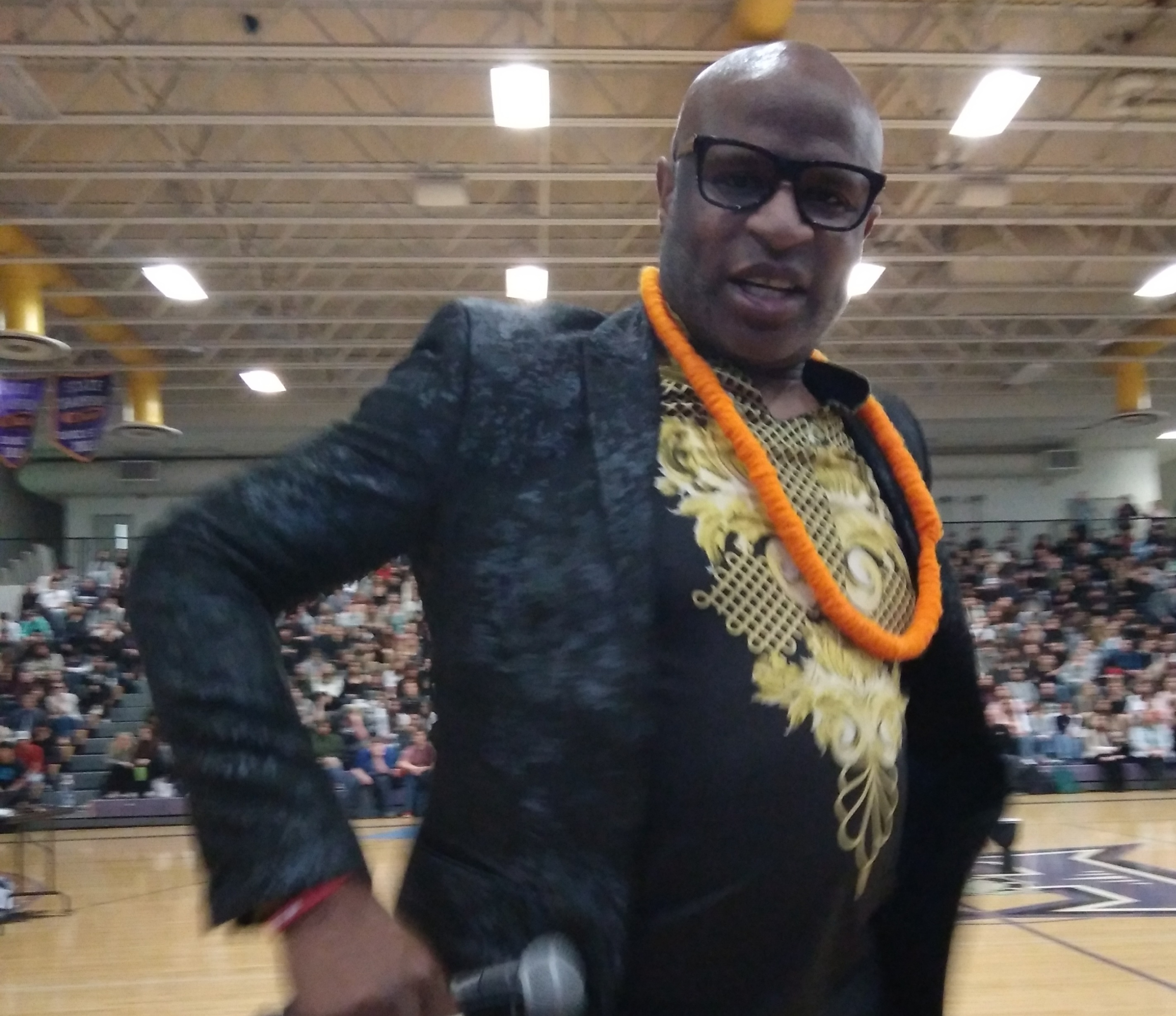
- Boyé in a speech performance in Oregon, US
- Born: 16 August 1970 (age 56); London, England, UK
- Occupations: Singer; actor; dancer; musician
- Spouse: Julie Boyé (m. 2007)

YouTube information
- Channel: Alex Boyé
- Years active: 2012–present
- Genre: Music
- Subscribers: 779 thousand
- Views: 236.92 million
- Last updated: 8 November 2026
- Website: alexboye.com

Alex Boyé (born 16 August 1970) is a British-American singer, dancer, and actor. He was named the "2017 Rising Artist of the Year" in a contest sponsored by Pepsi and Hard Rock Cafe.

== Early life, family and education ==
Boyé was born in London, England, on 16 August 1970 to Nigerian parents. While pregnant, Boyé's mother went to London while his father remained in Nigeria. By his own account, Boyé never knew his father. His mother remarried and worked for the London Underground, cleaning tracks at night. One day his mother said she was going to Nigeria for a couple of weeks for a visit and did not return for eight years.

Boyé was raised in the Tottenham neighborhood that has been described as "tough". He spent much of his youth in foster homes with Caucasian parents.

As a teenager, he listened to and was influenced by African-American artists, including Stevie Wonder, Kool and the Gang, James Brown, Marvin Gaye, Nat King Cole, Jackie Wilson and Otis Redding.

At age 16, Boyé was working in a McDonald's in London when he was introduced to the Church of Jesus Christ of Latter-day Saints (LDS Church) by a manager. He was baptized soon afterward. Boyé first performed in public while serving as an LDS Church missionary in Bristol, England.

== Career ==
=== The 1990s ===
After completing his LDS Church mission, Boyé became a backup dancer, including for George Michael.

In 1995, he formed and became the lead singer of Awesome, a European boy band.

Awesome performed at local dances and other small venues until 1996 when they won a vocal competition on Capital Radio, London's largest radio station. Subsequently, Universal Records of Europe signed Awesome to a five-album recording contract. Awesome released three singles off their first album, Rumors, which made top-10 charts all across Europe.

The band sold 500,000 albums and performed alongside artists that included Bryan Adams, George Michael, Simon and Garfunkel, MC Hammer, and many others. But Boyé disliked the lifestyle of a touring musician. "I had this dream of being a musician, but it was taking me down a road that led somewhere I didn't want to go," he said. Boyé decided to leave the band in 1999 to pursue a solo career. He lost all of the material possessions he had gained as a member of Awesome when the record company took the apartment, the clothes, the phone and the money.

In 1999, Boyé joined two other artists in London to discuss recording a demo tape of LDS Church hymns with a pop/R&B spin. One of the artists sat at the piano and hit upon a jazz sound for the hymn "Count Your Many Blessings" which became the signature song for the group. That evening they began to improvise church hymns and eventually created 'Soul Saints'. Within a couple of weeks, the group had started recording the songs and gave performances at Hyde Park, London before going on to tour in Utah. Wayne Scholes was the group's manager and Excel Records acted as a consultant while Soul Saints were in the United States.

=== The 2000s ===
In 2000, Boyé moved to Salt Lake City, Utah, to pursue a career in Mormon music. He released his first religious album The Love Goes On in 2001.

When the lead actor portraying Frederick Douglass in the Rodgers Memorial Theatre's production of Frank Wildhorn's Civil War dropped out three weeks before the play opened, Boyé was recruited as a replacement. With no prior acting experience and no knowledge of the Civil War, he learned his lines and united the cast. Glenn McKay, the theatre's board president, had recruited black performers for the show from the Calvary Baptist choir and other area churches, but was having trouble melding them with his Davis County regulars. McKay said Boyé "saved the production." Boyé followed that success with the role of Abinadab in the Lightstone Films production of David and Goliath. In 2005, Boyé received an award from the LDS Booksellers Association for his album Testimony. Boyé also appeared in a 2008 episode of the BYU produced TV show The Writers' Block.

Boyé was seeking a way to build a Latter-day Saint audience when he met Craig Jessop, then conductor of the Mormon Tabernacle Choir, at a Latter-day Saint music festival and he encouraged Boyé to audition for the choir. Boyé joined the 360-voice Mormon Tabernacle Choir in 2006 and became one of its three black members. He also continued to pursue a solo career. He had two solo parts in the choir's album Come Thou Fount of Every Blessing.

=== The 2010s ===
In 2010, Boyé performed the single, "Born to Be a Scout", at the National Scout Jamboree at Fort A.P. Hill, Virginia. Boyé was signed to Deseret Book's Shadow Mountain label. In August 2010, he was a featured soloist in a concert connected at the re-dedication of a Catholic church in St. George, Utah.

Songs by Boyé have appeared in movie soundtracks including Charly (2002), The Dance, Baptists at Our Barbecue and Church Ball.

Boyé was featured in a video by The Piano Guys, released in January 2012 as "Peponi", a cover of Coldplay's "Paradise" on YouTube. In early 2013 he did a cover of the Lumineers' "Ho Hey" that also generated a large number of YouTube hits.

In early 2013, Boyé signed with Wenrick-Birtcher Entertainment (Eddie Wenrick & Baron R. Birtcher) as his managers. In March 2013, Boyé opened for a performance by Olivia Newton-John at the Royal Albert Hall. A documentary DVD entitled Front Man telling Boyé's story has also been produced. In 2013, Boye released a song entitled "I Am Gold".

In early 2014, he, along with the One Voice Children's Choir, created an Africanized tribal version of the popular song "Let It Go" from the movie Frozen. The video went viral, propelling Boyé's combined YouTube views to over 100 million. It was selected as YouTube's best pop cover of 2014. He also released his Lemonade video on YouTube with more than 1.7 million views.

Boyé had a role in the 2014 film Saints and Soldiers: The Void. He also released a YouTube music video to promote the film. He attained some acclaim for his cover of Taylor Swift's song "Shake It Off", with over 600,000 views, as of 1 January 2015.

In December 2014, Boyé released an original Christmas song and YouTube video entitled "Newborn – Wise Men Still Seek Him".

In January 2015, Boyé released an Africanised version of "Circle of Life", with proceeds from the sale going to the koinsforkenya mission. In 2015, Boyé was awarded the Governor's Mansion Artist Award.

In June 2015, Boyé and his band, Changing Lanes Experience, performed their version of Taylor Swift's "Shake It Off" on the 10th season of America's Got Talent. After receiving great comments from the judges, they advanced into the next round to perform on Judge Cuts Week. In August 2015, he and the band were eliminated on Judge Cuts Week 4 after performing their version of Mark Ronson and Bruno Mars' "Uptown Funk".

In September 2015, Boye was announced to be cast as The Heavenly Guide in the remake of the film Saturday's Warrior. It was released in Utah theaters on 1 April 2016 before expanding it to various other states in the following weeks and months.

In early 2016 Boye and the Brigham Young University Men's Chorus released a version of Christopher Tin's "Baba Yetu", the theme music to the video game Civilization IV with lyrics adapted from the Biblical Lord's Prayer in Swahili.

Boyé appeared in a duet with Marie Osmond on her album Music Is Medicine that was released on 15 April 2016. The video for the song "Then There's You" was released on the video streaming site Vevo on 27 March 2016 and features the duo performing in a Las Vegas backdrop at Caesars Palace Hotel and the Paris Hotel. Boyé was cast as Pastor Aiken in Drop Off, which was a family film.

Boyé was selected as the "Grand Prize Winner" of the Hard Rock Rising 2017 Battle of the Bands. That same year, Boyé performed as the guest artist for the 2017 Mormon Tabernacle Choir Pioneer Concert, performing a mix of originals and covers.

In September 2018, Boyé released the single "Bend Not Break", which focuses on suicide prevention and was produced by Randy Jackson (American Idol). The music video was filmed in Herriman, Utah with help from over 1,000 students from Herriman High, as well as members of the community.

== Personal life ==
Boyé met his wife, Julie, in an LDS Church singles ward and they were married in the Salt Lake Temple on 6 January 2007. They have eight children.

In 2009, Boyé began raising money to buy a house for a local refugee family with sales of his single, "Crazy for You".

On 22 February 2012, Boyé became a United States citizen in a ceremony at the Rose Wagner Theater in Salt Lake City. He was surprised when he was invited by the judge conducting the ceremony to sing "The Star-Spangled Banner".

== Discography ==
=== Albums ===
- Testimony (2004)
- Spirit (2007)
- Be Still, My Soul: Classic Hymns & Folk Songs (2009)
- Africanized (2014)
- African Gospel Inspirations (2016)
- Coming to Amerika (2019)

=== EPs ===
- Hope for Israel (2011)
- We All Bleed the Same (2016)
- Africanized Christmas (2016)

=== Singles ===
Year	Song(s)	Artist	Album	Role
2012	"Peponi (Paradise)"	The Piano Guys	The Piano Guys	Featured Artist
2015	"Revelation"	Alan Hewitt & One Nation	Evolution	Featured Artist
2016	"Then There's You"	Marie Osmond	Music Is Medicine	Featured Artist

== Filmography ==
Year	Title	Role	Notes
2004	3.2 Percent (TV Series)	Himself	1 episode
2005	David and Goliath	Abinidab	Movie
2008	The Writers' Block (TV Series)	Joshua	1 episode
2012	Front Man: The Alex Boye Story	Himself	Documentary
2012	Restoring Love	Himself/Singer	TV movie
2012	The Song That Changed My Life	Himself	1 episode
2014	The Hour of Power	Himself/Musical Guest	1 episode
2014	Saints and Soldiers: The Void	Private Perry	Movie
2016	Saturday's Warrior	The Heavenly Guide	Movie
2016	Drop Off	Pastor Aiken	Movie
2016	Music and the Spoken Word	Himself	1 episode
2019	Show Offs	Himself	1 episode
2020	Green Flake	Jacob	Movie
