= Who's Sorry Now (album) =

Studio album by Marie Osmond
- Released: March 8, 1975
- Genre: Country pop
- Label: MGM
- Producer: Sonny James

Marie Osmond chronology
| In My Own Little Corner of the World (1974) | Who's Sorry Now (1975) | This Is the Way That I Feel (1977) |

Singles from Who's Sorry Now
- 1. "Who's Sorry Now" Released: February 1975

Professional ratings
Review scores
| Source | Rating |
|---|---|
| Allmusic | 2.5/5 stars |

Who's Sorry Now is the third solo studio album by American country music singer Marie Osmond. It was her last solo album released under MGM Records. Produced by Sonny James. Recorded at Columbia Studios, Studio B Nashville, TN

The album's lead single was the title track, a cover of Connie Francis' Top 10 Pop hit from 1958. Osmond's version reached the Top 30 on the Billboard Country Chart, the Top 40 on the Billboard Hot 100, and also was a minor on the Hot Adult Contemporary Tracks chart. It was the album's only single. The album includes additional covers of songs by Pat Boone ("Love Letters in the Sand"), Kitty Wells ("Making Believe"), and Sonny James ("It's the Little Things"), as well as two additional standards that had also been popularized by Connie Francis ("Among My Souvenirs" and "Jealous Heart").

Who's Sorry Now peaked at #20 on the Billboard Top Country Albums chart and #152 on the Billboard 200. In addition, the album was reviewed by Allmusic and received 2.5 out of 5 stars.

== Track listing ==
1. "Who's Sorry Now" — (Bert Kalmar, Harry Ruby, Ted Snyder)
2. "Anytime" — (Herbert "Happy" Lawson)
3. "This I Promise You" — (Ronald C Myers)
4. "Love Letters in the Sand" — (J. Fred Coots, Charles F. Kenny, Nick A. Kenny)
5. "Making Believe" — (Jimmy Work)
6. "The Things I Tell My Pillow" — (Sonny James, Jim Jones)
7. "Among My Souvenirs" — (Edgar Leslie, Horatio Nicholls)
8. "Jealous Heart" — (Jenny Lou Carson)
9. "Clinging Vine" — (Leon Carr, Grace Lane, Earl Shuman)
10. "It's the Little Things" — (Arlie Duff)

== Chart positions ==
Album – Billboard (United States)

| Year | Chart | Position |
|---|---|---|
| 1975 | Country Albums | 20 |
| 1975 | Pop Albums | 152 |

Singles – Billboard (United States)

| Year | Single | Chart | Position |
|---|---|---|---|
| 1975 | "Who's Sorry Now" | Country Singles | 29 |
| 1975 | "Who's Sorry Now" | Pop Singles | 40 |
| 1975 | "Who's Sorry Now" | Adult Contemporary Singles | 21 |
