= Paper Roses (album) =

Studio album by Marie Osmond
- Released: September 1973
- Recorded: June 1973
- Studios: Columbia (Nashville, Tennessee)
- Genre: Country pop
- Labels: Kolob; MGM
- Producers: Sonny James; Don Ovens

Marie Osmond chronology
Paper Roses (1973)	In My Little Corner of the World (1974)

Singles from Paper Roses
- 1. "Paper Roses" Released: August 1973

Paper Roses is a studio album by American singer Marie Osmond. It was released in September 1973 in conjunction with MGM Records and Kolob Records. Paper Roses was the debut studio album in Osmond's career and its title track was released as her debut single. The song topped the US and Canadian country charts. It also crossed over onto both the US, Canadian and UK pop charts upon its release. The album itself also topped the US country charts, while also reaching chart positions in Canada and the United Kingdom. An additional nine tracks were included on the album, many of which were covers of previously recorded country songs.

== Background ==
Marie Osmond is the only sister in the Osmond entertainment family. In 1970, her brothers rose to pop success as a singing group called The Osmonds. Marie herself was then encouraged to follow a similar entertainment path. Unlike her brothers, Marie chose the country music recording industry as her career focus. A tape of Marie singing was sent to Don Ovens, an executive at Nashville's MGM record division. Ovens was impressed by Osmond's singing and ultimately signed her to a recording contract at his label. She was then brought to Nashville where Ovens began working with Osmond on her debut studio album.

== Recording and content ==
Paper Roses was recorded in sessions held in June 1973 at the Columbia Studio in Nashville, Tennessee. The album was produced by Sonny James, with executive production done by Don Ovens. Sonny James was initially skeptical about producing Osmond, but ultimately agreed after hearing her original tape. James and Ovens chose all the material for Osmond's debut studio album, beginning with the title track. A total of ten tracks comprised the album. Included was three tracks penned by James himself, including his original country single "You're the Only World I Know". Osmond also covered the country songs "Everything Is Beautiful", "Fool No. 1", "Sweet Dreams", "It's Such a Pretty World Today" and "Too Many Rivers".

== Release, critical reception and singles ==
Professional ratings
Review scores
Source	Rating
Allmusic	2/5 stars

Paper Roses was released in September 1973 by MGM Records and Kolob Records. Kolob was the Osmond family's record label. The album was distributed as both a vinyl LP and a cassette. Both formats featured five tracks on each side of the discs. The album was the debut studio album in Osmond's solo career. Paper Roses made its debut on the US Billboard 200 all-genrre chart on September 22, 1973. It spent a total of 23 weeks there, reaching number 59 position on November 24. It became her highest-peaking solo album on the chart in her career. Paper Roses made its debut on the US Top Country Albums chart on October 6, 1973 and spent 20 weeks there. By November 17, the album topped the US country chart, becoming Osmond's only disc to top the country chart.

In Canada, the album also made their RPM all-genre chart, climbing to number 38 around the same time. It was also her only solo album to make the UK Albums Chart, climbing to the number two position.

The album was preceded by the release of the title track as a single in August 1973. The title track reached the number one spot on the US Hot Country Songs chart, becoming one of four singles by Osmond to top the country songs list in the US. In Canada, it was one of three songs to reach the number one spot on the RPM Country Tracks chart in her career. The single also crossed over onto the pop charts, reaching number five on the US Billboard Hot 100, number 12 on Canada's RPM Top Singles chart, number 12 in Australia and number two in the UK.

== Track listing ==
Side one
No.	Title	Writer(s)	Length
1.	"Paper Roses"	Fred Spielman; Janice Torre	2:39
2.	"Louisiana Bayou"	Sonny James; Carole Smith	2:19
3.	"Everything Is Beautiful"	Ray Stevens	3:18
4.	"You're the Only World I Know"	James; Robert Tubert	2:15
5.	"Fool No. 1"	Kathryn R. Fulton	2:05

Side two
No.	Title	Writer(s)	Length
6.	"Least of All You"	James; Smith	2:37
7.	"Sweet Dreams"	Don Gibson	2:36
8.	"Too Many Rivers"	Harlan Howard	2:22
9.	"It's Such a Pretty World Today"	Dale Noe	2:50
10.	"True Love Lasts Forever"	Edgar Clayton; Smith	3:15

== Personnel ==
All credits are adapted from the liner notes of Paper Roses.

- Stan Hutto – Engineer
- Sonny James – Producer
- The Jordanaires – Background vocals
- James London – Photography
- Cam Mullins – String arrangements
- Don Ovens – Executive producer, liner notes
- Saul Saget – Art direction
- Charlie Tallent – Engineer
- The Hershel Wigginton Singers – Background vocals

== Charts ==
=== Weekly charts ===
Chart (1973)	Peak position
Canada Top Albums (RPM)	38
UK Albums (Official Charts)	2
US Billboard 200	59
US Top Country Albums (Billboard)	1

== Release history ==
Region	Date	Format	Label	Ref.
Australia; New Zealand	September 1973	Vinyl LP	MGM Records; Kolob Records	
Europe	September 1973	Vinyl LP; cassette	MGM Records; Kolob Records	
North America	September 1973	Vinyl LP; cassette	MGM Records; Kolob Records	
South Korea	1974	Vinyl LP	MGM Records; Kolob Records	
