= New Season (Donny and Marie Osmond album) =

Studio album by Donny and Marie Osmond
- Released: November 27, 1976
- Genre: Pop, Country
- Label: Polydor / Kolob Records
- Producer: Alan Osmond, Michael Lloyd, Mike Curb

Donny and Marie Osmond chronology
Featuring Songs from Their Television Show (1976)	New Season (1976)	Winning Combination (1977)

Singles from New Season
- 1. "Ain't Nothing Like the Real Thing" Released: November 27, 1976

Professional ratings
Review scores
Source	Rating
Allmusic	3/5 stars

New Season is an album released by Donny and Marie Osmond in 1976. It was recorded at Kolob Recording Studios in Los Angeles, California and Provo, Utah. One single was released from the album, a cover of Marvin Gaye and Tammi Terrell's "Ain't Nothing Like the Real Thing," peaking at No. 21 on the Billboard Hot 100. The album reached No. 85 on the Billboard Top 200 chart on January 29, 1977. It was certified Gold by the RIAA on January 12, 1978.

== Track listing ==
No.	Title	Writer(s)	Length
1.	"Ain't Nothing Like the Real Thing"	Nickolas Ashford, Valerie Simpson	2:20
2.	"Anytime Sunshine"	Peter Shelley, Ben Findon	3:26
3.	"It's All Been Said Before"	Dennis Lambert, Brian Potter	2:28
4.	"Which Way You Goin' Billy"	Terry Jacks	2:52
5.	"Show Me"	Joe Tex	3:10
6.	"You Broke My Heart"	Danny Rush, Reinald	2:45
7.	"Now We're Together"	Alan Osmond, Merrill Osmond, Wayne Osmond	2:57
8.	"Hold Me, Thrill Me, Kiss Me"	Harry Noble	2:44
9.	"Sing"	Alan Osmond, Merrill Osmond, Wayne Osmond, Jimmy Osmond	3:30
10.	"We Got Love"	John Goodison, Simon Byrne	3:10

== Personnel ==
- Produced by Alan Osmond, Michael Lloyd, Mike Curb
- Recorded at Kolob Recording Studios
- Art direction: Beverly Parker
- Design: William Naegels
- Engineered by Humberto Gatica, Wayne Osmond, Michael Lloyd

== Certifications ==
Region	Certification	Certified units/sales
United States (RIAA)	Gold	500,000^{^}
^{^} Shipments figures based on certification alone.
