= Donny & Marie (1976 TV series) =

Television series

- Created by: Sid and Marty Krofft
- Written by: Arnie Kogen
- Directed by: Art Fisher
- Starring: Donny Osmond; Marie Osmond
- Composers: Earl Brown; Bob Rozario (music arrangements and conducting); Claude Williamson (additional arrangements); Tommy Oliver
- Country of origin: United States
- No. of episodes: 78

Production
- Executive producers: The Osmond Brothers; Raymond Katz
- Producers: Sid and Marty Krofft; Art Fisher; Arnie Kogen
- Running time: 45–49 minutes
- Production companies: Osmond Productions; Sid & Marty Krofft Television Productions

Original release
- Network: ABC
- Release: January 23, 1976 – May 27, 1979

Donny & Marie is an American variety show that aired on ABC from January 1976 to May 1979. The show starred brother-and-sister pop duo Donny and Marie Osmond. Donny had first become popular singing in a music group with his brothers, The Osmonds, and Marie was one of the youngest singers to reach No. 1 on the Billboard country music charts (with "Paper Roses", in 1973).

The siblings were offered a weekly show by ABC-TV President Fred Silverman after he saw the duo co-host a week on The Mike Douglas Show which followed their series of popular remakes of oldies, such as "I'm Leaving It All Up to You", "Morning Side of the Mountain" and "Make the World Go Away". Donny and Marie (18 and 16 years old, respectively, when the program premiered) were the youngest entertainers in TV history to host their own variety show. A year later, The Keane Brothers would break this record.

== Overview ==
The Osmond family had long relied on television as part of their act, dating to the early 1960s when the father of The Lennon Sisters convinced George Osmond to lead the family onto television. This led to a long run on television during that decade, most enduringly with The Andy Williams Show; the group had largely abandoned the medium during their run as pop and rock stars of the early 1970s.

Donny & Marie was a Friday night show that consisted of an ice skating number intro, comedy skits, followed by songs performed by the duo. The series popularized the song "A Little Bit Country, A Little Bit Rock 'N Roll", which formed the basis of a weekly ("Concert Spot") segment where Marie ("I'm a little bit country") would trade off singing a country music song with Donny ("I'm a little bit rock and roll") singing a rock and roll song. Each episode concluded with a musical finale and a cascade of balloons from the ceiling, matched to the colors of the sets and costumes. Donny and Marie would then sing their trademark closing song which was written by Alan Osmond, "May Tomorrow Be a Perfect Day". Occasionally, the show would feature roughly 15-minute musical adaptations of famous feature films, such as Star Wars and The Wizard of Oz, with a mix of original cast members and celebrity guest stars. Paul Lynde and Ruth Buzzi were semi-regulars for the run of the series. (Lynde's appearance was part of a burn-off to fulfill his contract with ABC.)

The show was shown in the UK on Sunday afternoon on BBC1, where it was always billed as "The Osmonds".

The show's popularity declined in its final two seasons after it was revealed that teen heartthrob Donny was dating (and eventually married) fellow Utahn Debbie Glenn, therefore taking him 'off the market' of eligible bachelors, and it aired in the same time slot with Wonder Woman. According to an edition of the VH1 series Behind the Music, many female viewers started to tune out at this point. The series also underwent a format change in the final season, eliminating segments such as the ice skaters and country/rock-n-roll segments in favor of more concert-style disco numbers. The show was also retitled The Osmond Family Show midway through the season, and was moved from the Friday night timeslot that it had occupied since its debut to Sunday night; the program increasingly featured the Osmond Brothers in larger roles. The variety show genre as a whole, at the time, was in steep decline, and the success of Donny & Marie was somewhat of an aberration compared to the trends of television in the late 1970s (two of the last successful variety shows, The Sonny & Cher Show and The Carol Burnett Show, left the air in 1977 and 1978, respectively). The Osmonds themselves were facing declining popularity in the music realm at the same time (something they partially blamed on focusing so much attention on the television side); their 1979 disco-influenced album Steppin' Out was a commercial flop. Further hurting the duo's popularity, they had declined roles in the eventual smash hit film Grease to star in Goin' Coconuts, which flopped at the box office.

The 1980–1981 TV season featured Marie with a Bob Mackie fashion make-over and starring in her own solo variety series on NBC called Marie, which was also produced at Silverman's behest and attempted to follow a similar format. It was a replacement series and contracted for only seven episodes.

Donny and Marie teamed up again in 1998 to co-host Donny & Marie (also known as The Donny and Marie Hour and The Donny and Marie Show), a talk show that ran for two seasons. They continue to perform live, most recently for a long-term residency at the Flamingo Las Vegas.

== Merchandising ==
- Donny & Marie dolls with an accompanying "TV Studio" play set were released in August 1977.
- A Donny & Marie wireless toy microphone, that transmitted to AM radio frequencies, was released in 1977. The design was based on the white Shure SM61 mics used on the show. (The songs on the show were all lip-synched. The mics were just props, with an XLR plug and an antenna attached, to make them look real.)
- Tiger Beat published a Donny & Marie magazine during the run of the series that focused on the personal lives of the two singers, as well as frequent profiles of other Osmond family members. The magazine, which ended around the same time the TV series did, was published with the support of the family and included advertisements for Osmond-related merchandise.

== Production notes ==
Originally, the show was created by Sid & Marty Krofft and videotaped in Los Angeles at KTLA Studios (known as the Golden West Videotape Division, and now known as the Old Warner Brothers Studio), but creative control of the show was given to the Osmonds after a long battle, and Donny & Marie was moved to the Osmond Studios (known as the Osmond Entertainment Center) in Orem, Utah in November 1977.

The popularity of the series resulted in Donny and Marie filming the movie Goin' Coconuts during its spring 1978 production hiatus, in which they played fictionalized versions of themselves.

Two Miss Americas guest starred on the Donny & Marie show: Susan Perkins (Miss America 1978, appearing on Season 3, Episode 3.4 on October 13, 1977) and Kylene Barker (Miss America 1979, appearing on Season 4, Episode 4.3 in 1979).

== Broadcast history and Nielsen ratings ==
Season	Time slot (ET)	Rank	Rating
1975–76	Fridays 8 p.m.	27	N/A
1976–77	Fridays 8 p.m.	37	N/A
1977–78	Fridays 8 p.m.	34	19.3
1978–79	Fridays 8 p.m. (Sep 1978-Jan 1979); Sundays 7 p.m. (Jan-May 1979)	62	16.3

== Media references ==
- In the video game Fallout: New Vegas, you can find two dogs belonging to Motor-Runner, the leader of the Fiends faction. If you have taken the Wild Wasteland trait at the beginning of the game, Motor-Runner's dogs will be named Donnie and Marie.

== See also ==
- Featuring Songs from Their Television Show
