= This Is the Way That I Feel =

Studio album by Marie Osmond
- Released: April 9, 1977
- Recorded: October, November 1976
- Studio: Live tracking: FAME Recording, Muscle Shoals, AL Lead vocal overdubs: KOLOB Recording, Provo, Ut Strings: Devonshire Recording, Hollywood, CA
- Genre: Pop
- Label: Polydor/Kolob
- Producer: Rick Hall

Marie Osmond chronology
Who's Sorry Now (1975)	This Is the Way That I Feel (1977)	There's No Stopping Your Heart (1985)

Singles from This Is the Way That I Feel
- 1. "This Is the Way That I Feel"; 2. "Please Tell Him That I Said Hello"

Professional ratings
Review scores
Source	Rating
Allmusic	3/5 stars

This Is the Way That I Feel is the name of the fourth solo studio album released by American country music singer, Marie Osmond. This was Osmond's first album under the Polydor/Kolob label, following her departure from MGM Records. It was released in April 1977 and would be her last solo studio album for eight years.

This Is the Way That I Feel was a departure for Osmond as it took a more Pop-sounding direction than any of her previous albums. The album produced two singles, only the title track charted, peaking within the Top 40, at #39, on the Billboard Hot 100 chart in the summer of 1977; that song was written by George Jackson, who had previously penned the breakthrough hit "One Bad Apple" for Osmond's brothers. The other single from the album, "Please Tell Him That I Said Hello," failed to chart.

The album reached a peak of #152 on the Billboard 200 albums chart. The album was produced by Rick Hall, who had also previously produced for her brothers in the early 1970s. It was reviewed by Allmusic and was given 3 out of 5 stars.

== Track listing ==
1. "This Is the Way That I Feel" — (George Jackson) 3:20
2. "Play the Music Loud" — (Alan Osmond, Merrill Osmond, Wayne Osmond) 3:09
3. "Didn't I Love You, Boy" — (Barbara Wyrick) 3:27
4. "Please Tell Him That I Said Hello" — (Mike Stepstone, Peter Dibbens) 3:25
5. "Miss You Nights" — (Dave Townsend) 4:03
6. "Where Did Our Love Go" — (Holland-Dozier-Holland) 3:10
7. "Cry Baby, Cry" — (Alan Osmond, Merrill Osmond, Wayne Osmond) 3:22
8. "You're My Superman, You're My Everything" — (John Lombardo) 3:20
9. "All He Did Was Tell Me Lies (To Try to Woo Me)" — (Kim Carnes) 3:35
10. "Run to Me" — (Barry Gibb, Maurice Gibb, Robin Gibb) 3:02

== Chart positions ==
Album – Billboard (North America)

Year	Chart	Position
1977	Pop Albums	152

Singles – Billboard (North America)

Year	Single	Chart	Position
1977	"This Is the Way That I Feel"	Billboard Hot 100	39
