= Marie (1980 TV series) =

- Genre: Variety show
- Directed by: Jeff Margulis
- Presented by: Marie Osmond
- Starring: Marie Osmond
- Music by: Bob Rozario; D'Vaughn Pershing
- Country of origin: United States
- Original language: English
- No. of seasons: 1
- No. of episodes: 7

Production
- Executive producers: Alan Osmond; Jay Osmond; Jerry McPhie
- Producers: Neal Israel; Pat Proft
- Running time: 60 minutes
- Production company: Osmond Productions

Original release
- Network: NBC
- Release: December 12, 1980 – September 26, 1981

Marie is an American comedy-variety limited series hosted by and starring singer-actress Marie Osmond that aired on NBC from December 12, 1980, to September 26, 1981, with a total of seven episodes, split across two abbreviated seasons.

== Overview ==
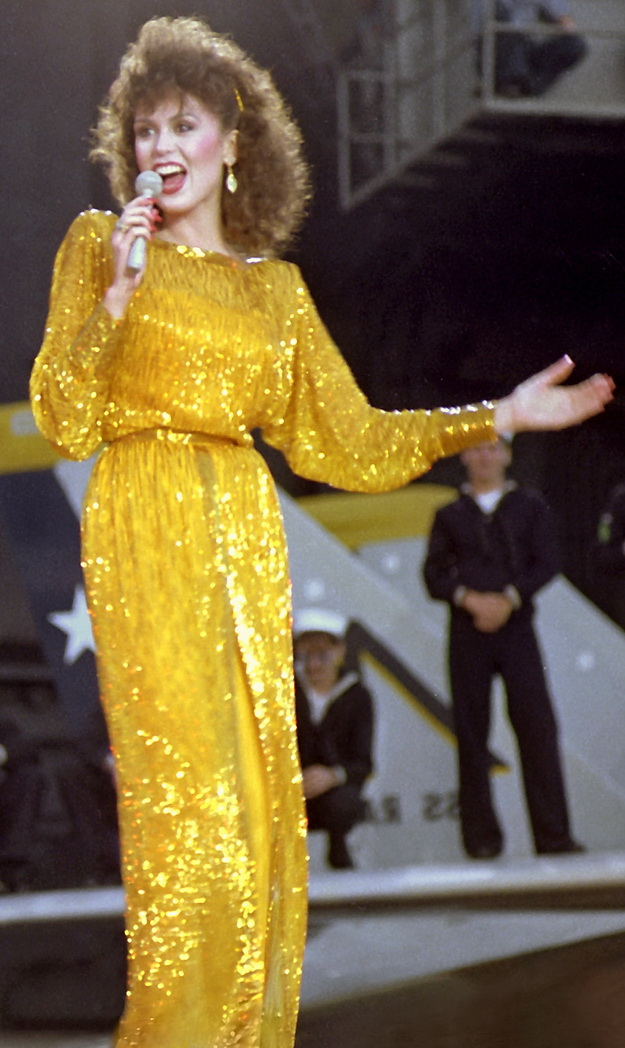
Marie Osmond in 1981.

Fred Silverman, then the President of NBC, had attempted to replicate the success of the 1976–79 variety show Donny & Marie (which Silverman had commissioned while at ABC) when he green-lit Pink Lady and Jeff earlier in 1980. That show proved to be an all-around disaster and was canceled after only five episodes.

The Osmond family was in a lull in their career in 1979 after the cancellation of Donny & Marie, with their 1979 album Steppin' Out being a commercial failure; Donny Osmond, in particular, had experienced a sudden loss of popularity following his marriage and, having grown increasingly bitter about his fortunes, retreated from the public spotlight. Family patriarch George Osmond pressured the siblings to pursue money-making projects to cover his bad business deals because he refused to declare bankruptcy or let his children do the same. Marie had starred in a sitcom pilot also named Marie that was not greenlit. With the Osmonds in debt from their investment into Donny & Marie, and with Silverman in need of an established hit, Marie Osmond returned to variety television in December 1980 and headlined her own show on NBC in an attempt to repeat the success of her earlier variety series, but without the baggage of the now-married Donny. She was contracted to do seven shows for NBC.

The new show showcased Osmond's singing, acting and comedic talents in the same format of a traditional variety series (similar to Donny & Marie) which featured musical numbers, comedy sketches and various guest stars each week. Guest stars included TV personalities and musical artists such as Gavin MacLeod, Jeff Conaway, Tony Orlando, The Pointer Sisters, Andy Williams, Scott Baio, Sally Struthers, David Copperfield, Nell Carter, Bob Hope, The Commodores and Andy Gibb. Noticeably absent on-camera were Marie's brothers; of them, only Jimmy Osmond appeared on the show as a guest in one episode, though Donny Osmond appeared as a surprise during the closing number of the premiere episode to tell Marie he thought she was great and had a winner. (Alan and Jay were listed as executive producers.)

The show was part of a successful financial turnaround for the family, which combined with the brothers' country music albums and their development of Stadium of Fire, got the family out of debt by 1983.

== Episode list ==
| Nº | Original airdate | Guest stars | Songs performed |
|---|---|---|---|
| 1.1 | December 12, 1980 | Gavin MacLeod; Jeff Conaway | "I'm Coming Out" "It's Still Rock and Roll to Me" "What Kind of Fool" "He's Out of My Life" |
| 1.2 | December 19, 1980 | Tony Orlando; Jay Johnson; The Pointer Sisters | "Another One Bites the Dust" "Could I Be Dreaming" "Don't Cry Out Loud" "The Colors of My Life" "He's So Shy" |
| 1.3 | December 26, 1980 | Andy Williams; Fred Willard; Scott Baio | "Hit Me with Your Best Shot" "Times of Your Life" "Never Knew Love Like This Before" "I Could Have Been a Sailor" |
| 1.4 | January 2, 1981 | Sally Struthers; David Copperfield; Erik Estrada | "Fame" "I'm Very You, You're Very Me" "Give Me the Night" "In My Life" |
| 1.5 | September 12, 1981 | Nell Carter; Bob Hope; Jimmy Osmond | Judy Garland medley: "You Made Me Love You (I Didn't Want to Do It)"; "The Trolley Song"; "Maybe I'll Come Back"; "Uncertain" "Send Me You" "It Don't Mean a Thing (If It Ain't Got That Swing)" "Far Away Places" "On the Road Again"/"Gotta Travel On" |
| 1.6 | September 19, 1981 | Grant Goodeve; The Commodores | "9 to 5" "Sail On"; The Commodores medley: "Still"; "Brick House"; "Three Times a Lady"; "Midnight Magic"; "Sometimes When We Touch" |
| 1.7 | September 26, 1981 | Andy Gibb; Stephen Stucker | "Come On In" "Suddenly" "Tenderly" "Time Is Time" |

== Broadcast history ==
NBC ordered seven episodes of Marie, which aired in two batches. The first four episodes aired weekly from December 12, 1980, through January 2, 1981. The remaining three episodes aired in September 1981, again airing weekly. The series was produced by the Osmond family's production company, Osmond Productions.
