= I Can Do This =

Studio album by Marie Osmond
- Released: November 16, 2010
- Genre: Christian
- Length: 56:56
- Label: Osmond Entertainment, LLC
- Producer: Jerry Williams

Marie Osmond chronology
Steppin' Stone (1989)	I Can Do This (2010)	Music Is Medicine (2016)

Singles from I Can Do This
- 1. "Pie Jesu"

Professional ratings
Review scores
Source	Rating
Allmusic	3/5 stars

I Can Do This is the ninth studio solo album by American singer Marie Osmond, released on November 16, 2010, through her family's company Osmond Entertainment, LLC. This album is the first collection of mostly Christian music released by Osmond. The album was re-released on CD and digital download on January 12, 2016.

== Background ==
The album was arranged and produced by Jerry Williams. It was recorded with the City of Prague Philharmonic Orchestra at Smecky Music Studios in Prague, Czech Republic with additional recording at Rite Tune Studios.

The only single from the album titled Pie Jesu was recorded with the Mormon Tabernacle Choir conducted by Mack Wilberg.

The album entered the Billboard Christian Music charts at number 5 on November 27, 2010, and only remained on the charts for one week. The album has sold 49,000 copies in the US as of April 2016.

All proceeds of this album were donated to Children's Miracle Network Hospitals, the charity in which she co-founded (with John Schneider) in 1982. She is quoted on the liner notes saying "I give this donation as a gift of love and hope for the future of our children".

== Track listing ==
1. "How Great Thou Art" — (Carl Gustav Boberg) 4:20
2. "I Can Only Imagine" — (Bart Millard) 4:26
3. "Pie Jesu" — (Andrew Lloyd Webber) 3:20
4. "Now Thank We All Our God" — (Pastor Martin Rinkart) 4:57
5. "World Without Walls" — (Tyler Castleron) 4:07
6. "Tell Me To Breathe" — (Gary Baker, Karen Kingsbury) 3:52
7. "I Need Thee Every Hour" — (Annie Hawks) 3:25
8. "Ave Verum Corpus" — (Mozart) 2:45
9. "I Can Do This" — (Rachel Thibodeau) 4:23
10. "Lead Kindly Light" — (Katharina con Schlegel) 4:48
11. "Bless This House" — (Olive Osmond) 3:26
12. "Gift To Be Simple" — (Joseph Brackett) 4:31
13. "Tender Mercies" — (Jerry Williams, Taryn Scalia) 4:28
14. "The Only One" — (Shane Baker) 4:08

== Personnel ==
- Todd Sorrenson — drums
- Rob Honey — bass
- Michael Dowdle — electric guitar

== Chart performance ==
=== Album ===
Chart (2010)	Peak position
US Billboard 200	71
US Top Christian Albums (Billboard)	5

=== Singles ===
Year	Single
2010	"Pie Jesu"
