= All in Love =

Studio album by Marie Osmond
- Released: July 1988
- Recorded: March 1988
- Genre: Country pop
- Length: 34:22
- Labels: Capitol; Curb
- Producers: Ed Seay; Paul Worley

Marie Osmond chronology
I Only Wanted You (1986)	All in Love (1988)	Steppin' Stone (1989)

Singles from All in Love
- 1. "Without a Trace" Released: March 1988; 2. "Sweet Life" Released: August 1988; 3. "I'm in Love and He's in Dallas" Released: November 1988

All in Love is a studio album by American singer Marie Osmond. It was released by Capitol Records and Curb Records in July 1988. The album featured a total of ten tracks that were cut with a country pop production. Among its tracks was a duet with Paul Davis called "Sweet Life". The track was among three charting singles included on All in Love. The additional singles were "Without a Trace" and "I'm in Love and He's in Dallas". All in Love made the top 40 of the US country chart and was given mixed reviews from critics.

== Background, recording and content ==
Marie Osmond formed her own career apart from the Osmond band that her brothers became synonymous with during the 1970s. Along with having careers in film, television and business, she also had a career as a country recording artist. At age 13, Osmond had her first chart-topping single with "Paper Roses" (1973). She returned to the country industry in the early 1980s as an adult. Signing with Capitol Records, she had her greatest commercial success during this period with number one songs like "Meet Me in Montana" and "There's No Stopping Your Heart". As the decade progressed, Osmond had fewer high-charting records but continued recording.

Her eighth album was 1988's All in Love. The project was produced by Paul Worley and Ed Seay. It was recorded in March 1988. The album consisted of ten tracks. The album was described as being a series of ballads that were given pop production. Included was a cover of Paul Davis's "Sweet Life", which was recorded as a duet with Davis himself.

== Release and critical reception ==
Professional ratings
Review scores
Source	Rating
Allmusic	3/5 stars

All in Love was released in July 1988 in a joint venture between Capitol Records and Curb Records. It was distributed in three formats: a vinyl LP, a cassette and a compact disc. Decades later, it was re-released by Curb Records to digital formats such as Apple Music.

The album was given mixed reviews from critics following its release. Cashbox called it an album with "slick production" and "mellow songs". Reviewers believed Osmond would find radio success with songs like "Without a Trace" and "Sweet Life". Meanwhile, Billboard thought the album's lyrics were too "fluffy" and had production that was "excessively sweet". Charlotte Dillon of AllMusic rated the album three out of five stars believed the album was "overlooked by many critics" and praised the project: "The songs on this offering are country with a good double-sized helping of pop stirred into the mix, and this was recorded back before every other country singer was adding more pop style into his or her country numbers."

== Chart performance and singles ==
All in Love debuted on the US Top Country Albums chart on July 30, 1988. It spent a total of 16 weeks on the chart and reached the number 29 position on August 20, 1988. It was Osmond's final top 40 country album while at the Capitol-Curb labels. A total of three singles were spawned from All in Love. The first was "Without a Trace", which was issued by Capitol in March 1988. The single reached number 50 on the US Hot Country Songs chart and number 40 on the Canadian RPM Country Tracks chart. The second single off the project was the Davis-Osmond duet "Sweet Life" (first issued as a single in August 1988). It was the album's highest-charting US single, reaching number 47 on the Hot Country Songs chart while climbing to number 55 on the Canadian RPM country chart. "I'm in Love and He's in Dallas" was the album's final single, released in November 1988. The single reached number 59 on the US country chart.

== Track listing ==
All in Love (LP, CD, cassette and digital)
No.	Title	Writer(s)	Length
1.	"I'm in Love and He's in Dallas"	Richard Leigh; Kent Robbins	2:54
2.	"Raining Tears"	Robbins	3:23
3.	"My Home Town Boy"	Carol Ann Etheridge; Alice Randall; Lisa Silver	3:51
4.	"Baby's Blue Eyes"	Matraca Berg; Ronnie Samoset	3:12
5.	"Lonely as the Night Is Long"	Paula Breedlove; Johnny MacRae; Bob Morrison	3:33
6.	"99% of the Time"	Paul Davis; Hillary Kanter; Amy Sky; Even Stevens	3:43
7.	"Somebody Else's Moon"	Beth Nielsen Chapman; Robbins	4:07
8.	"Sweet Life"	Susan Collins; Davis	3:41
9.	"All in Love"	Tony Haselden; Stan Munsey, Jr.	3:07
10.	"Without a Trace"	Katerina Kitridge; Sonny Throckmorton	3:07

== Personnel ==
All credits are adapted from the liner notes of All in Love.

Musical personnel

- Eddie Bayers – drums
- Michael Black – background vocals
- Jessica Boucher – background vocals
- Mike Brignardello – bass guitar
- Dennis Burnside – piano, synthesizer
- Larry Byrom – acoustic guitar, electric guitar
- Paul Davis – lead vocals on "Sweet Life"
- Paul Franklin – pedal steel guitar
- Greg Galbreath – acoustic guitar, electric guitar
- Steve Gibson – electric guitar
- Jon Goin – electric guitar
- Mark Hammond – drums
- Mitch Humphries – piano, synthesizer
- Dave Innis – piano, synthesizer
- Jana King – background vocals
- Alan Moore – string arrangements
- Nashville String Machine – strings
- Mark O'Connor – fiddle, mandolin
- Joe Osborn – bass guitar
- Marie Osmond – lead vocals, background vocals
- Martin Parker – drums
- Michael Rhodes – bass guitar
- Tom Robb – bass guitar
- Matt Rollings – piano, synthesizer
- Lisa Silver – background vocals
- James Stroud – drums
- Steve Turner – drums
- Diane Vanette – background vocals
- Bergen White – string arrangements
- Dennis Wilson – background vocals
- Paul Worley – acoustic guitar, electric guitar

Technical personnel

- Joe Bogan – engineer
- Benjamin Czilier – art direction, design
- Sharon Eaves – production coordination
- Tom Harding – assistant engineer, engineer
- Marshall Morgan – engineer
- Gary Paczosa – assistant engineer
- Mike Poole – assistant engineer, engineer, mixing, mixing assistant
- Danny Purcell – mastering
- Aaron Rapoport – photography
- Ed Seay – engineer, mixing, producer
- Clarke Schleicher – assistant engineer, engineer
- Tommy Steele – art direction, design

- Paul Worley – producer

== Chart performance ==
=== Weekly charts ===
Chart (1988)	Peak position
US Top Country Albums (Billboard)	29

== Release history ==
Region	Date	Format	Label	Ref.
Australia	July 1988	Vinyl LP; cassette	Capitol Records; Curb Records	
North America	July 1988	Vinyl LP; compact disc; cassette	Capitol Records; Curb Records	
United Kingdom	July 1988	Vinyl LP	Capitol Records	
North America	circa 2020	Music download; streaming	Curb Records	
