= Featuring Songs from Their Television Show =

Featuring Songs From Their Television Show

Studio album by Donny & Marie Osmond
- Released: April 3, 1976
- Genre: Pop, R&B, country
- Label: Polydor
- Producer: Mike Curb

Donny & Marie Osmond chronology
Make the World Go Away (1975)	Featuring Songs From Their Television Show (1976)	New Season (1976)

Singles from Featuring Songs from Their Television Show
- 1. "C'mon Marianne" Released: 1976; 2. "Deep Purple" Released: 1976; 3. ""A" My Name is Alice" Released: 1976

Professional ratings
Review scores
Source	Rating
Allmusic	3/5 stars

Featuring Songs from Their Television Show is a 1976 studio album by Donny & Marie Osmond based on their television series Donny & Marie. In addition to their hit song "Deep Purple", the release includes Donny's solo effort, a cover of "C'mon Marianne". The album reached No. 57 on the Billboard Top LPs chart on May 15, 1976. and was certified gold by the RIAA on December 23, 1976.

== Track listing ==
No.	Title	Writer(s)	Length
1.	"C'mon Marianne"	L. Russell Brown, Raymond Bloodworth	2:20
2.	"Butterfly"	Danyel Gérard, Mack David, Mike Curb, Ralph Bernet	3:00
3.	"A Little Bit Country, A Little Bit Rock 'N Roll"	Marty Cooper	2:30
4.	"Dandelion"	Bill Cushenberry, Guy Randle, Marvin Payne	2:37
5.	"Deep Purple"	Mitchell Parish, Peter de Rose	2:48
6.	""A" My Name is Alice"	Al Kasha, Joel Hirschhorn	2:25
7.	"Sunshine Lady"	Chris Christian	2:36
8.	"Take Me Back Again"	Mike Curb	2:41
9.	"Weeping Willow"	Guy Randle, Marvin Payne	2:40
10.	"It Takes Two"	Sylvia Moy, William Stevenson	2:48
11.	"May Tomorrow Be a Perfect Day" (Theme from Donny & Marie television show)	Alan Osmond, Merrill Osmond, Wayne Osmond	1:52

== Certifications ==
Region	Certification	Certified units/sales
United States (RIAA)	Gold	500,000^{^}
^{^} Shipments figures based on certification alone.
