= Morning Side of the Mountain =

1959 song performed by Tommy Edwards

Single by Tommy Edwards
- A-side: "Please Mr. Sun" (1959 release)
- Released: 1951; February 1959
- Genre: Pop
- Label: MGM
- Songwriters: Larry Stock; Dick Manning

"Morning Side of the Mountain"

Single by Donny & Marie Osmond
- B-side: "One of These Days"
- Released: November 1974
- Genre: Pop; Ballad
- Label: MGM/Kolob
- Songwriters: Larry Stock; Dick Manning
- Producer: Mike Curb

Donny & Marie Osmond singles chronology
"I'm Leaving It Up to You" (1974)	"Morning Side of the Mountain" (1974)	"Make The World Go Away" (1975)

"Morning Side of the Mountain" is a song written by Larry Stock and Dick Manning and first recorded in 1951 by Tommy Edwards. It settled at #24 on the pop chart. Edwards re-recorded it in 1959, reaching #27 on the Billboard Hot 100. The re-release was featured as the B-side of Edwards' other hit, a cover of Johnnie Ray's 1952 success, "Please Mr. Sun."

== Donny & Marie Osmond cover ==
Late in 1974, Donny & Marie Osmond released a version which scored #8 on the Billboard Hot 100 and spent one week at #1 on the Easy Listening chart. The song charted equally well in Canada and the UK.

=== Weekly charts ===
Chart (1974–1975)	Peak position
Australia (Kent Music Report)	34
Canada RPM Top Singles	8
Canada RPM Adult Contemporary	1
Ireland (IRMA)	7
UK	5
U.S. Billboard Hot 100	8
U.S. Billboard Easy Listening	1
U.S. Cash Box Top 100	6

=== Year-end charts ===
Chart (1975)	Rank
Canada RPM Top Singles	81
UK	76
U.S. Billboard Hot 100	74
U.S. Cash Box	90
U.S. Billboard Easy Listening	22

== See also ==
- List of number-one adult contemporary singles of 1975 (U.S.)
