= Steppin' Stone (album) =

Studio album by Marie Osmond
- Released: September 1989
- Recorded: May 1989
- Studios: Castle Recording Studios; Music Mill Studios; Omnisound Recording Studios
- Genres: Country; traditional country
- Labels: Capitol; Curb
- Producer: Jerry Crutchfield

Marie Osmond chronology
All in Love (1989)	Steppin' Stone (1989)	I Can Do This (2010)

Singles from Steppin' Stone
- 1. "Steppin' Stone" Released: August 1989; 2. "Slowly But Surely" Released: November 1989; 3. "Let Me Be the First" Released: circa early 1990

Steppin' Stone is a studio album by American singer Marie Osmond. It was released in September 1989 by the Capitol and Curb record labels. It was Osmond's eighth studio album in her solo recording career. Steppin' Stone was a collection of ten tracks that were described as having a traditional country sound compared to her previous albums. Three singles were issued from Steppin' Stone that reached positions outside the US and Canadian country top 40: the title track, "Slowly But Surely" and "Let Me Be the First". The album was given positive reviews from critics.

== Background and recording ==
A part of her family's entertainment family, Marie Osmond formed her own career as a country music artist. As a teenager, her debut single "Paper Roses" was a chart-topping country single and a top five pop single. As she matured, she transitioned towards a film and television career but returned to the country recording industry in adulthood. In the middle 1980s (on Capitol Records), she had number one country singles with "Meet Me in Montana", "There's No Stopping Your Heart" and "You're Still New to Me". Osmond continued having charting singles through the end of the decade despite being less successful. Her next Capitol studio album was 1989's Steppin' Stone. The project was recorded in May 1989 at three separate studios in the Nashville, Tennessee area: Castle Recording Studios, Music Mill Recording Studios and Omnisound Recording Studio. It was produced by Jerry Crutchfield. It was her first album project with Crutchfield serving as producer.

== Content ==
Steppin' Stone consisted of ten tracks. The album's traditional country sound was considered a departure from Osmond's previous releases. Charlotte Dillon of AllMusic described the album's material as being "about love lost, love found, love gone wrong, and the hope and wishes of love to be." "What Would You About You (If You Were Me)" and "What's in It for Me" were both co-written by Bucky Jones and Tom Shapiro. "If You Think About It, Call Me", was a track also written by Shapiro and was a second cut written by Michael Garvin. "What's a Little Love Between Friends" was co-written with Smokey Robinson. The final track "Let Me Be the First" was first cut by Deborah Allen for her 1984 album of the same name.

== Release and critical reception ==
Professional ratings
Review scores
Source	Rating
Allmusic	4/5 stars

Steppin' Stone was released in conjunction with Capitol Records and Curb Records in September 1989. It was distributed in three formats: a vinyl LP, a cassette and a compact disc. It was Osmond's eighth studio album as a solo artist and her fourth with the Capitol/Curb labels. It was later released decades later to digital retailers including Apple Music. The album was given positive reviews by critics and publications following its release. Cashbox magazine called the album "expertly produced" that allows Osmond's "true colors" to show through. Billboard found that Jerry Crutchfield provided Osmond with a different vocal delivery: "Under Crutchfield's guidance, Osmond sings with more than usual force and conviction."

Radio & Records did not highlight any specific songs or production techniques, but mentioned the album and wrote, "Today she is an in-demand live performer and continues to record stellar country albums." AllMusic's Charlotte Dillon gave Steppin' Stone four out of five stars and wrote, "Marie Osmond steps a little away from the pop-heavy country she normally leans toward, for a little more straight country sound."

== Chart performance and singles ==
Steppin' Stone debuted on the US Billboard Top Country Albums chart on November 18, 1989. It spent a total of six weeks there, reaching the number 68 position by December 2. It was Osmond's lowest-peaking album on the country chart. A total of three singles were spawned from Steppin' Stone. Its first was the title track in August 1989. It later reached number 70 on the US Hot Country Songs chart and number 60 on the Canadian Country Tracks chart. In November 1989, "Slowly But Surely" was issued as the album's second single. It reached the number 75 position on the US country chart and number 52 on the Canadian country chart. "Let Me Be the First" was the final single released from the album and was issued by Capitol Records in circa early 1990. It failed to chart on the US country chart but reached number 75 on the Canadian country chart.

== Track listing ==
Steppin' Stone (LP, CD, cassette and digital)
No.	Title	Writer(s)	Length
1.	"What Would You Do About You (If You Were Me)"	Michael Garvin; Bucky Jones; Tom Shapiro	3:36
2.	"Slowly But Surely"	Garvin; Jones; Jim Weatherly	2:56
3.	"What's in It for Me"	Ron Hellard; Jones; Shapiro	3:15
4.	"Steppin' Stone"	Gary Scruggs; Kevin Welch	3:43
5.	"What's a Little Love Between Friends"	Kent Robbins; Smokey Robinson	3:59
6.	"If You Think About It, Call Me"	Garvin; Shapiro	3:41
7.	"Help Me Get Over You"	Walt Aldridge; Lisa Angelle	3:51
8.	"A Too Blue Moon"	Charlie Black; Rory Michael Bourke	3:33
9.	"Love Speaks Louder Than Words"	Taylor Dunn; Paul Overstreet; Kaysie Poulsen; Kellie Poulsen	2:37
10.	"Let Me Be the First"	Deborah Allen; Kix Brooks; Rafe Van Hoy	3:38

== Personnel ==
All credits are adapted from the liner notes of Steppin' Stone.

Musical personnel

- Jessica Boucher – background vocals
- David Briggs – keyboards
- Clyde Brooks – drums
- Mark Casstevens – acoustic guitar, guitar
- Carol Chase – background vocals
- Steve Fishell – guitar, steel guitar
- Sonny Garish – guitar, steel guitar
- Steve Gibson – acoustic guitar, electric guitar, guitar
- Greg Gordon – background vocals
- Mitch Humphries – keyboards
- Larrie Londin – drums
- Terry McMillan – harmonica, percussion
- Marie Osmond – lead vocals
- Paul Overstreet – background vocals
- Matt Rollings – keyboards
- Brent Rowan – electric guitar
- Dennis Wilson – background vocals
- Bob Wray – bass
- Curtis Young – background vocals

Technical personnel

- Jim Cotton – engineer
- Jerry Crutchfield – producer
- Paul Goldberg – assistant engineer
- Peter Grant – design
- Chris Hammond – engineer
- Carry Hendricks – engineer
- Scott Hendricks – engineer, remixing
- Tom Hitchcock – assistant engineer
- Mark Nevers – engineer, remix assistant
- Warren Peterson – engineer
- Lynn Peterzell – engineer
- Bob Ryan – makeup
- Hank Williams – engineer

- Tommy Steele – art direction
- Carry Summers – assistant engineer

== Chart performance ==
=== Weekly charts ===
Chart (1989)	Peak position
US Top Country Albums (Billboard)	68

== Release history ==
Region	Date	Format	Label	Ref.
Indonesia	September 1989	Cassette	Capitol Records; Curb Records	
North America	September 1989	Vinyl LP; cassette; compact disc	Capitol Records; Curb Records	
North America	circa 2010	Music download; streaming	Curb Records	
