= Goin' Coconuts =

- Directed by: Howard Morris
- Written by: William Mark Daniels; Raymond Harvey
- Produced by: John Cutts
- Starring: Donny Osmond; Marie Osmond; Herb Edelman; Kenneth Mars; Ted Cassidy; Marc Lawrence; Khigh Dhiegh; Harold Sakata; Jack Collins; Danny Wells; Charles Walker; Tommy Fujiwara
- Cinematography: Frank V. Phillips
- Edited by: Frank Bracht
- Music by: Nelson Riddle; Ed Forsyth
- Production company: Inter Planetary Pictures
- Distributed by: Osmond Entertainment
- Release dates: October 6, 1978 (Hawaii); October 17, 1978 (wide)
- Running time: 96 minutes
- Country: United States
- Language: English
- Box office: $1,234,000 (US rentals)

Goin' Coconuts is a 1978 American musical adventure comedy film directed by Howard Morris and starring Donny and Marie Osmond. The feature film tells a tale of Donny and Marie becoming embroiled in a dispute between two criminal gangs over a necklace while they visit Hawaii to perform in a concert. Released in theaters on October 17, 1978, it was both a critical and commercial failure.

== Synopsis ==
After performing in a concert, Donny and Marie Osmond head for the airport to catch a flight to Hawaii. At the airport, they wait for a telephone booth occupied by Charlie, who unbeknownst to them, is a member of a theft ring. Charlie is making a phone call to his boss, Wong, to inform Wong that he has retrieved a necklace Wong wants and to warn him that a man named Webster, who works for a Professor Kruse, also wants the necklace. As Donny and Marie wait for Charlie to finish his phone call, an attractive blond woman named Tricia approaches them. Donny flirts with her, but she has no interest in him. Meanwhile, Charlie sees Webster approaching and gives the necklace to Marie, telling her it is a gift to her from his church, and Tricia sees him do it. A few moments later, Webster corners Charlie and demands to know the whereabouts of the necklace, and Charlie denies having any knowledge of it.

Donny, Marie, their manager Sid, Tricia, Charlie, and Webster all board the plane, and during the flight to Hawaii Webster kills Charlie with a cup of poisoned water. After the plane lands in Hawaii, Wong's henchmen Mickey and J.L. discover Charlie's body, while Webster calls Professor Kruse to tell him that he believes that Charlie hid the necklace somewhere. Tricia asks Marie about the necklace, and Webster, Mickey, and J.L. all overhear their conversation and see that Marie is wearing the necklace.

Webster tails Donny and Marie out of the airport, and Mickey and J.L. recognize him. Mickey and J.L. begin to follow Donny and Marie's limousine, while Webster steals a car and tails them as well, but Mickey and J.L. force him off the road. Webster then steals a driving school′s car and continues his pursuit of Donny and Marie. He forces Mickey and J.L's car to crash, but in the process loses control of his own car and flips it over, suffering injuries that put him in the hospital. Donny and Marie remain completely unaware of Mickey, J.L., and Webster and the car chase and crashes taking place behind their limousine.

After Donny and Marie reach their hotel, J.L. poses as a deliveryman bringing flowers to Donny and Marie's hotel suite so that he can get their suite number. Donny sees Tricia in the hotel lounge and asks Marie to leave them alone, so Marie heads back to their hotel suite. Donny approaches Tricia and asks her out, but to his disappointment she suggests that Marie come along. Meanwhile, Marie returns to the suite to find Mickey ransacking it as he looks for the necklace. While Donny is walking Tricia back to her room, he hears Marie scream and rushes to their suite. He finds Marie fighting Mickey off and jumps in to protect her. Mickey flees and Donny pursues him out of the hotel, but loses him in a crowd of fans. Donny rejoins Marie, who says that she thinks Mickey was looking for her necklace, but Donny dismisses the idea. In response to the incident, Sid tells them that he will hire additional security to protect them. Wong arrives at the hotel, where Mickey and J.L. fill him in on what has happened.

Kruse and his henchman Ito visit Webster at the hospital, finding him bandaged from head to toe and unable to speak. To communicate with him, Kruse shows him a picture of Donny and Marie and tells him to wiggle his toes to answer yes-or-no questions about the picture. Meanwhile, Ito turns on the television, on which he and Kruse see Donny and Marie performing on a local television show and Kruse notices that Marie is wearing the necklace. At the television studio, Sid introduces Donny and Marie to Al, their new security guard. On stage, Marie notices Wong staring at her in the audience and becomes flustered, forgetting the lyrics to songs.

After the show, Donny and Marie return to their hotel, where Donny asks Marie what happened to make her forget the lyrics, and Marie again tells him that she believes that someone is after her necklace. Donny says that they should dispose of the necklace, but Marie wants to keep it and puts it in a jewelry box instead. As Donny leaves the hotel suite, Kruse and Ito check into the room next door and Wong, Mickey, and J.L. check into the room on the other side moments later. Alone in her suite, Marie hears noises and notices Kruse and Ito peeking through her windows, and someone steals her necklace. In the hotel's basement, Kruse, Mickey, Wong, Ito, and J.L. all sneak up on one another, then accuse each other of having the necklace. When they realize that none of them have it, they reluctantly agree to cooperate to find out who has stolen it from Marie.

In the hotel suite, Marie talks to a policeman, Lieutenant Alecki, about the theft of her necklace. Outside, Donny tells Sid that he stole the necklace because he thinks that Marie is merely imagining that gangsters are after it and that it is distracting her during her performances. Donny throws the necklace into the hotel's wishing well and returns to the hotel suite with Sid to find Marie with Alecki. Alecki tells Donny he found fingerprints on the jewelry box which will allow him to identify the thief. Afraid that he will be revealed as the thief, Donny talks Al, the security guard, into secretly returning the necklace. Tricia and Marie catch Al breaking into the suite, and Tricia subdues him with surprising ease. Donny returns and tries to convince Marie that Al stole the necklace, but Alecki calls Marie and tells her that the only fingerprints on the jewelry box are hers and Donny's. Marie realizes that Donny stole the necklace and is furious with him. Kruse hears from a contact he has at the police laboratory about the fingerprints, and Wong says that the theft was merely a ruse by Donny and Marie to throw him off the trail of the necklace.

The next day Alecki suggests Marie take the necklace to a local museum to have it appraised. She does, not realizing that the expert appraising it is Kruse. Kruse tells her the necklace is worthless and tries to convince her to give it to him, but she decides to keep it. Donny arrives at the museum, and he and Marie leave on a motorcycle. Kruse, Wong, and their henchmen give chase and start shooting at Donny and Marie, and Donny recognizes one of them, Mickey, as the man who Marie had found ransacking their hotel suite. Donny and Marie narrowly escape, return to the hotel, and tell Sid what happened. He wants to cancel their upcoming show, but they insist on going ahead with the performance. At the show, Alecki brings extra police to protect Donny and Marie and watch for criminal activity. While performing, Donny and Marie see Mickey, J.L., and Ito, all dressed as policemen, on both sides of the stage, and they flash their guns. Sid notices Ito wearing sandals, realizes that he is not a real police officer, and notifies Alecki, who arrests all three of them after the show.

The following day, Alecki tells Donny and Marie that the three men are not talking, but that he confiscated an old map from one of them. Marie notices that the necklace matches part of the map and points to a spot in the ocean off Hawaii. Alecki takes Donny, Marie, and Sid in his boat to the location indicated by the map, where Donny and Alecki go scuba diving and find a sunken World War II submarine filled with gold bars. They recover the gold and bring it to Alecki's boat. Kruse and Wong are watching from another boat and attack Alecki's boat, but Donny and Alecki fight them off and speed away, accidentally knocking Sid into the water in the process. Kruse and Wong launch a remotely controlled jet ski rigged with explosives in pursuit of Alecki's boat and Sid, unaware of the explosives, climbs onto the jet ski. Donny realizes that Sid is in danger. Tricia arrives in a rescue helicopter, throws down a ladder to Alecki's boat, and Donny climbs aboard the helicopter. They catch up with Sid and pull him off the jet ski just before it runs into Kruse and Wong's boat and explodes.

The next day, Tricia explains to Donny and Marie that she is with the United States Navy, and has been looking for the necklace and the submarine for over a year. Donny again asks her out on a date, but she tells him that she is married. Donny suffers from a brief depression at the news, but recovers quickly when another pretty woman approaches. Donny, Marie, and Sid board a plane to return home.

== Cast ==
- Donny Osmond as Donny
- Marie Osmond as Marie
- Herb Edelman as Sid
- Kenneth Mars as Kruse
- Ted Cassidy as Mickey
- Marc Lawrence as Webster
- Khigh Dhiegh as Wong
- Harold Sakata as Ito
- Jack Collins as Charlie
- Danny Wells as Al
- Charles Walker as Jake
- Tommy Fujiwara as Alecki

== Production ==
Filming of Goin' Coconuts took place on Oahu in Hawaii from March 31 to May 1978 during the annual production hiatus for the Osmonds' variety television series Donny & Marie. A rendition of the TV show's closing song, "May Tomorrow Be a Perfect Day," is included in the soundtrack.

Donny and Marie chose to film Goin' Coconuts instead of accepting roles in the 1978 film Grease, which was being filmed at the same time; Marie was to play Sandy and Donny the Teen Angel in Grease. They chose Goin' Coconuts mainly out of a belief that the project was more family-friendly.

Goin' Coconuts was Ted Cassidy's final film appearance before his death in January 1979, although he continued to amass a number of posthumous animation-voiceover credits.

Debbie Glenn, who Donny Osmond married in May 1978, makes a cameo appearance as a fan.

== Reception ==
Siskel & Ebert gave the film two negative reviews, with Roger Ebert stating Goin' Coconuts was full of "dumb jokes, bad editing and bad direction" with numerous clumsy product placements. He also felt the movie was "not as much fun" as the contemporary Donnie & Marie television show.

== Soundtrack ==
Goin' Coconuts

Soundtrack album by Donny & Marie
- Released: October 1978
- Genre: Pop rock
- Label: Polydor Records
- Producers: Mike Curb, Michael Lloyd

Singles from Goin' Coconuts
- 1. "On the Shelf" Released: October 1978

The Goin' Coconuts soundtrack was released on LP, cassette tape and 8-track tape by Polydor Records in October 1978. It earned platinum status, despite the film doing poorly at the box office.

The first and only single release, "On the Shelf", was a U.S. Top 40 hit during November 1978 (Billboard #38, AC #25). The song also charted in Canada, reaching #60 on the pop singles chart and spending two weeks at #14 on the Adult Contemporary chart. The album also included "May Tomorrow Be a Perfect Day", which the Osmonds sang to close each episode of their TV series.

The album was re-released by 7t / Cherry Red Records in the United Kingdom on a two-for-one CD in 2014. It was paired with Donny & Marie's 1977 album Winning Combination.

=== Track listing ===
No.	Title	Length
1.	"On the Shelf" (Steve Voice, Peter Yellowstone)	3:58
2.	"Don't Play With the One Who Loves You" (Michael Lloyd)	2:27
3.	"You Don't Have to Say You Love Me" (Pino Donaggio, Vito Pallavicini, Simon Napier-Bell, Vicki Wickham)	3:00
4.	"Baby Now That I've Found You" (Tony Macaulay, John MacLeod)	3:04
5.	"Gimme Some Time" (Paul Harrison)	2:54
6.	"Let's Fall in Love" (Harold Arlen, Ted Koehler)	2:51
7.	"You Bring Me Sunshine" (Alan Osmond, Merrill Osmond, Wayne Osmond)	2:32
8.	"Fallin' In Love Again" (Alan Osmond, Merrill Osmond, Wayne Osmond)	2:19
9.	"Doctor Dancin'" (Alan Osmond, Merrill Osmond, Wayne Osmond)	3:09
10.	"You Never Can Tell" (Chuck Berry)	3:20
11.	"May Tomorrow Be a Perfect Day" (Alan Osmond, Merrill Osmond, Wayne Osmond)	0:51

=== Certifications ===
Region	Certification	Certified units/sales
United States (RIAA)	Gold	500,000^{^}
^{^} Shipments figures based on certification alone.
