= Donny & Marie (1998 TV series) =

US television program

- Presented by: Donny Osmond; Marie Osmond
- Country of origin: United States

Production
- Running time: 60 minutes
- Production companies: Dick Clark Productions; Columbia TriStar Television Distribution

Original release
- Network: Syndication
- Release: September 21, 1998 – May 19, 2000

Donny & Marie is an American talk show hosted by Donny and Marie Osmond, that aired in syndication from September 1998 to May 2000 and was executive produced by Dick Clark, Charles Cook and Merrill Osmond. The show had a "house band", featuring Jerry Williams (musical director/keyboards), Kat Dyson (guitar), Paul Peterson (bass), and Nick Vincent (drums), and would also occasionally perform with musical guests. Though the show received back-to-back nominations for the Daytime Emmy Award for Outstanding Talk Show Host in 2000 and 2001, Columbia TriStar Television cancelled the show after two seasons, due to high expense and insufficient ratings growth to justify the cost.
