= Anita Bryant discography =

- Bryant circa her career's start (1958)
- Studio albums: 23
- Soundtrack albums: 1
- Compilation albums: 6
- Singles: 13
- Other charted songs: 1

This is the discography of American singer Anita Bryant. It contains 23 studio albums, multiple compilation albums, 14 singles and other charted songs. Her debut single was 1958's "Dance On" on Carlton Records. The following year, she released "Till There Was You", which became a top-40 pop hit in the US. This prompted a self-titled studio album to be released.

In 1959, she had three additional hits: "Six Boys and Seven Girls", "Promise Me a Rose (a Slight Detail)", and "Do-Re-Mi", but all three had lower sales. In early 1960, Bryant had a top-10 hit with "Paper Roses". The song also made the US R&B chart and the top-40 in the UK. "My Little Corner of the World" hit the top-10 as well and spawned a studio album. An album followed (In My Little Corner of the World), which brought her to the LP charts for the first time. Her final top-40 hit was released in 1961, titled "Wonderland by Night;" it was previously a hit by orchestra leader Bert Kaempfert.

However, Bryant's chart performance dried up soon, and she changed labels that year to Columbia Records. The label bought up all of Bryant's masters on Carlton and released her first compilation, titled Greatest Hits. Thereafter, Bryant made one more hit: "The World of Lonely People" (1964). Three of Bryant's studio albums made the Billboard 200 as well: In a Velvet Mood, As Long As He Needs Me, Mine Eyes Have Seen the Glory. The latter was devoted to the United States and its military. She made one last chart appearance with a Christmas album, Do You Hear What I Hear?: Christmas with Anita Bryant, in 1967. In the 1970s, Bryant changed labels to Word Records, a Christian-music-oriented label. She released five albums. During this time, Columbia's subsidiary Harmony released compilations of Bryant's previous material.

== Albums ==
=== Studio albums ===
List of albums, with selected chart positions, showing other relevant details
Title	Album details	Peak chart positions	
Title	Album details	US Bill.	US Cash.
Anita Bryant	Released: 1959; Label: Carlton Records; Formats: LP	—	—
Hear Anita Bryant in Your Home Tonight!	Released: 1960; Label: Carlton; Formats: LP	—	—
In My Little Corner of the World	Released: 1961; Label: Carlton; Formats: LP	99	—
Kisses Sweeter Than Wine	Released: 1961; Label: Columbia Records; Formats: LP	—	—
Abiding Love	Released: 1962; Label: Columbia; Formats: LP	—	—
In a Velvet Mood	Released: 1962; Label: Columbia; Formats: LP	145	—
The ABC Stories of Jesus	Released: 1962; Label: Columbia; Formats: LP	—	—
As Long As He Needs Me	Released: 1963; Label: Columbia; Formats: LP	—	80
The Country's Best	Released: 1963; Label: Columbia; Formats: LP	—	—
The World of Lonely People	Released: 1964; Label: Columbia; Formats: LP	—	—
The Best of Johnny Desmond & Anita Bryant at Jubilee 1964	Released: 1964; Label: Columbia; Formats: LP	—	—
I Believe	Released: 1965; Label: Columbia; Formats: LP	—	—
Mine Eyes Have Seen the Glory	Released: 1966; Label: Columbia; Formats: LP	146	99
Do You Hear What I Hear?: Christmas with Anita Bryant	Released: September 17, 1967; Label: Columbia; Formats: LP	25	—
How Great Thou Art	Released: 1968; Label: Columbia; Formats: LP	—	—
In Remembrance of You	Released: 1968; Label: Columbia; Formats: LP	—	—
Abide with Me	Released: 1970; Label: Word Records; Formats: LP	—	—
Naturally	Released: 1972; Label: Myrrh Records; Formats: LP	—	—
The Miracle of Christmas	Released: 1972; Label: Word; Formats: LP	—	—
Battle Hymn of the Republic	Released: 1973; Label: Word; Formats: LP	—	—
Old Fashioned Prayin'	Released: 1975; Label: Word; Formats: LP	—	—
Anita Bryant's All-Time Favorite Hymns	Released: 1975; Label: Word; Formats: LP	—	—
Anita with Love	Released: 1985; Label: BL Records; Formats: LP	—	—

=== Compilation albums ===
List of compilation albums, showing all relevant details
Title	Album details
Anita Bryant's Greatest Hits	Released: 1963; Label: Columbia; Formats: LP
Anita Bryant	Released: 1968; Label: Harmony Records; Formats: LP
Little Things Mean a Lot	Released: 1969; Label: Harmony; Formats: LP
World Without Love	Released: 1970; Label: Harmony; Formats: LP
You'll Never Walk Alone	Released: 1972; Label: Harmony; Formats: LP
Sweet Hour of Prayer	Released: 1973; Label: Harmony; Formats: LP

== Singles ==
List of singles, with selected chart positions, showing other relevant details
Title	Year	Peak chart positions					Album
Title	Year	US Pop	US Cash.	US R&B	US AC	UK Pop	Album
"Dance On" "Be Good, Be Careful, Be Mine"	1958	— —	— —	— —	— —	— —	Non-album tracks
"Till There Was You" "Little George (Got the Hiccoughs)"	1959	30 —	14 —	— —	— —	— —	Anita Bryant
"Six Boys and Seven Girls" "The Blessings of Love"	1959	62 —	68 —	— —	— —	— —	Hear Anita Bryant in Your Home Tonight
"Promise Me a Rose (A Slight Detail)" "Do-Re-Mi"	1959	78; 94	— 48	— —	— —	— —	Anita Bryant
"Paper Roses" "Mixed Emotions"	1960	5 —	7 —	16 —	— —	24 —	Hear Anita Bryant in Your Home Tonight
"My Little Corner of the World" "Anyone Would Love You"	1960	10 —	20 —	— —	— —	48 —	In My Little Corner Of The World; Anita Bryant
"One of the Lucky Ones" "Love Look Away"	1960	62 —	81 —	— —	— —	— —	Hear Anita Bryant in Your Home Tonight; Anita Bryant
"Wonderland by Night" "Pictures"	1961	18 —	2 —	— —	— —	— —	Hear Anita Bryant in Your Home Tonight
"A Texan and a Girl from Mexico" "He's Not Good Enough for You"	1961	85 —	72 —	— —	— —	— —	Hear Anita Bryant in Your Home Tonight
"I Can't Do It by Myself" "An Angel Cried"	1961	87 —	— —	— —	— —	— —	Hear Anita Bryant in Your Home Tonight
"Lonesome For You, Mama" "A Place Called Happiness"	1961	108 —	— —	— —	— —	— —	Non-album tracks
"Step By Step, Little By Little" "Cold Cold Winter"	1962	106 —	— —	— —	— —	— —	Greatest Hits
"The World of Lonely People" "It's Better to Cry Today Than Cry Tomorrow"	1964	59 —	69 —	— —	17 —	— —	The World of Lonely People
"Welcome, Welcome Home" "Laughing on the Outside"	1964	130 —	— —	— —	— —	— —	The World of Lonely People
"—" denotes releases that did not chart or were not released in that territory.
