= Gay USA (film) =

1977 documentary film by Arthur J. Bressan Jr.

- Film poster
- Directed by: Arthur J. Bressan Jr.
- Produced by: Arthur J. Bressan Jr. David Pasko; Joseph Knutson
- Cinematography: List: Emiko Omori; Douglas Dickinson; Jim Block; John Frazer; Lee Warneke; Henry Auvil; Stephen Fabus; Tom Eals; Steve McMillin; Joe Defrancesco; Peter Levine; David Rathod; Frederick Schminke; Max Schmid; Debbie Fort; Pat Rocco; Howard Gard; Grant Smith; Sara Linden; Bill Moritz; Paul Mathison; Peter Gallager
- Edited by: Arthur J. Bressan Jr. Thommy Padgett
- Production company: Artists United For Gay Rights
- Distributed by: Frameline; Kit Parker Films
- Release date: August 27, 1977; {San Francisco)
- Running time: 73 minutes
- Country: United States
- Language: English
- Budget: $8,000 – $11,000 (Note: Bressan said the cost was $8,000, and the Los Angeles Times and The San Francisco Examiner reported the cost at $11,000.)

Gay USA (also known as Gay USA: The Politics of Celebration), is a 1977 American documentary film directed by Arthur J. Bressan Jr. The film is the first American feature-length documentary by and about LGBTQ people, that focused on the gay rights movement. It has been widely hailed in the gay press as an instrument of solidarity for gay audiences.

Composed of footage shot at a number of gay pride events around the United States in June 1977, the film captures a time just as the gay rights movement began facing the first organized backlash in the form of Anita Bryant and her campaign to repeal anti-discrimination protection in Dade County. Bressan dedicated the film to Robert Hillsborough, who was murdered on June 22, 1977, on the streets of San Francisco for being gay.

== Synopsis ==
The film was shot on one day on June 26, 1977, by 25 different cameramen across the United States, under the direction of Arthur J. Bressan Jr. The film documents Gay Pride parades in San Diego, Houston, Los Angeles, Chicago, Philadelphia and New York City, with the primary focus on the Gay Freedom Day Parade in San Francisco.

Bressan was on location in San Francisco, on Market Street, interviewing parade participants. Among the people interviewed was Pat Parker, who read a poem. The film also includes songs sung, played or written by Ellen Robinson, Marjie Orten, Willow Wray, James O'Connor, Paul DuBois, David Blossom, Terry Garthwaite, David Garthwaite, Tommy Talley, Neal LaMonaco, Earl Galvin and Matthew McQueen.

Bressan dedicated the film to Robert Hillsborough, who was murdered in San Francisco, on June 22, 1977, for being gay. At the march in San Francisco, many participants believed Anita Bryant's "hate-filled" rhetoric was responsible for Hillsborough's death, since his attackers shouted: "Faggot ... Here's one for Anita."

The pre-title sequence ends with a brief statement by two tiny boys, about 9 or 10. The older places his arm around the other and says, 'I can probably speak for all the kids in the United States – and my brother even. We all believe in equal rights for kids. I think that should be made into a law too'.

== Background and production ==
When the Anita Bryant debacle happened I was hurled into making a political gay documentary. My naive dream at that point was that if we all saw ourselves in our numbers we would never buy into the guilty trip again.

— Arthur Bressan

Bressan conceived the idea for the film while marching in a San Francisco demonstration on June 7, 1977, against the Dade County referendum. Bressan said he had his movie camera "jammed in front of San Francisco City Hall", and as he "stood there and felt the energy swirl" around him, he wondered "if this was 'defeat' what would Gay Freedom Day be like?"

Within a matter of nineteen days, he had organized film crews throughout the country, and by June 26, eighty-five people were ready with cameras and sound equipment. In San Francisco there were nine film units, three sound units, and a camera in a helicopter for aerial footage. The San Francisco parade alone was made up of almost 250,000 participants. Bressan said the pride parades and demonstrations have always been a way "for individuals to get together and get power without dropping their individuality."

Bressan said the cost of the film was $8,000, and they started out with no cash, and he ordered the film COD, and when it arrived at the Greyhound bus station, he called his friends and told them he needed at least $900 to pick up the raw footage. He also stated that during the interviews with the parade participants, they used three standard questions, which consisted of: "Are you gay?" and "What do you think of the parade today?" and "If you could invite one person from history, one gay person, who would you invite?" and another question that popped up during the interviews was: "Are you angry about what's been happening to gay people?"

Bressan told the Bay Area Reporter in 1984, that the remembered the film as "a big response to the Anita Bryant witch hunt", and he thought if "people could see lots of gay people and their straight friends in a moment of celebration, it might be the antidote to the sort of venom and negativity which the Anita Bryan movement was about."

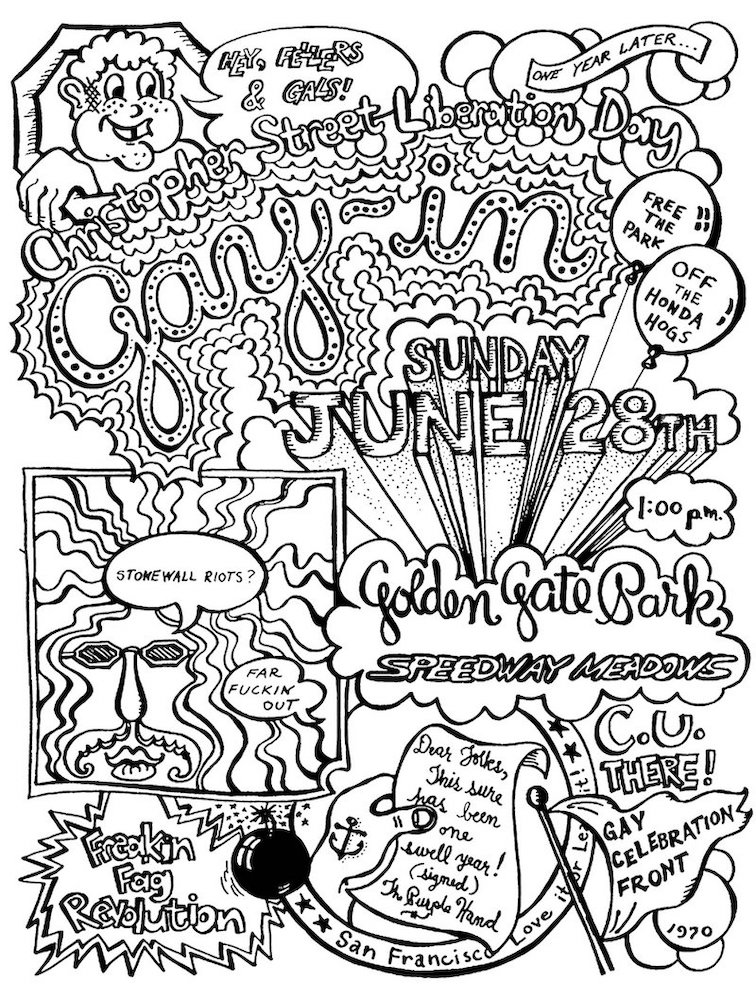
Christopher Street Liberation Day flyer (1970)

Joseph Knutson, one of the producers, said the film took "80 days from the time the concept of the film began to the time the film opened in San Francisco." He went on to say that "things began when Anita Bryant started things in Florida", and they were outraged about it and decided to "put this gay anger to constructive use."

In addition to the footage from the various marches across the country, the documentary also included rare footage shot by Lilli Vincenz of the very first gay pride parade in New York City in 1970 (which was then known as Christopher Street Liberation Day), as well as Bressan's own previous footage from San Francisco's first major gay pride celebration in 1972.

== Release ==
The film had its premiere in August 1977, at the Gay Film Festival of Super-8 Films in San Francisco, which later became known as the Frameline Film Festival. In an interview with The Emerald City, Bressan said there were 1,600 people in attendance at the premiere, and while there was very little publicity surrounding the premiere to attract an audience that size; he said it was basically due to a pre-interview he gave to The Advocate, local newspapers advertising the event, his roommates handing out leaflets, and Harvey Milk, the first openly gay elected official in California, helped spread awareness by selling tickets to the premiere at his shop, Castro Camera. After its initial premiere, it had a limited theatrical release, playing in 50 cities, and was reviewed in mainstream newspapers. The film had its premiere in Los Angeles on December 9, 1977, at the Los Feliz theater.

Bressan also recalled that the documentary was shown on a Wichita, Kansas television station, when a similar referendum to the one in Dade county, was started there to repeal a recently passed ordinance that prohibited discrimination against gay people. Anita Bryant's antigay group spent $10,000 in Wichita to help repeal the law.

=== Home media ===
In 2020, a 2K version of the film restored by a partnership consisting of Outfest, UCLA Film & Television Archive, and Frameline was released on DVD and Blu-ray by Vinegar Syndrome. The effort to restore the documentary was spearheaded by Bressan's sister, Roe Bressan and LGBT film historian Jenni Olson, calling the endeavor The Bressan Project. In 2024, it was released by Altered Innocence, in a version titled Gay USA: Snapshots of 1970s LGBT Resistance. This version also features other documentaries from the 1970s, including Lilli Vincenz's document of the first Pride Gay and Proud parade in New York City, and Wakefield Poole's short film Freedom Day Parade. There is also a half hour of raw footage shot by the Women's Liberation Cinema in 1971, and commentary by film historians Jenni Olson and Don Romesburg, a still photography slideshow, and a 16-page booklet with an essay by film critic Stephen A Russell.

== Critical analysis and reception ==
=== Analysis ===
Academic author Christopher Pullen, who focuses on sexuality in the media, argues that the film "focused on a particular point in political time, and public comments on gay identity: responses to the discourse of anti-gay performers such as Anita Bryant and public outrage at the murder of Robert Hillsborough." He further stated that the documentary "presents a large-scale community ideal focusing on gay identity at its center, and that such attention had not been afforded to gay citizens before in documentary on this scale."

Professor emeritus Tom Zaniello called the film a "tour de force", and further opined that the "marches culminated, or more precisely rebutted, the grotesque and vicious homophobic right-wing Christian campaign orchestrated by Anita Bryant, who had called gay people 'human garbage'."

Ronald Gregg, who writes and teaches about queer cinema, highlighted the film as one of four "highly influential queer documentaries that developed structural, stylistic, affective, and archival approaches for depicting the history of the queer world and political movement in documentary film." He went on to state that the film "illustrates the need that Bressan felt to rewrite the existing narratives about the queer past, filling in the silences about LGBTQ people and correcting the denigrating narratives."

Canadian author and lecturer Thomas Waugh observed that "the everyday performance discourses of lesbian and gay public life as it emerged after Stonewall (marches, parades, demonstrations, press-conferences, electoral campaigns, concerts, raids, trials) were handily recorded intradiegetically through realist codes, with Bressan's jubilant, sunlit Gay USA being the most fully developed example."

Lee Atwell of Film Quarterly argues that in the documentary "one is confronted with persons caught up in the communal excitement of the 'politics of celebration', in which spontaneous feelings and attitudes are highly charged; certainly, Gay USA is the first film ever to fully capture the intense anger, joy, and love embodied in these very public expressions of freedom." He goes on to state that the film is a "unique document in the history of cinema because it represents, for the first time, a truly open response to the world of a vast and extremely divergent human minority ... and one which will no longer remain silent in the face of bigotry and oppression ... that is now on the move to secure its human rights and full participation on an equal basis with the heterosexual majority."

=== Reception ===
Brian Bromberger from the Bay Area Reporter observed "there were signs encouraging people to come out to their families and work colleagues, despite the heavy risks at that time, with chants of 'Out of the closet, into the street'; still, as one marcher noted, 'having to lie, I feel, is the saddest and ugliest part of being homosexual'; as one commentator noted, it was still illegal to be openly gay, risking arrest and imprisonment; so as another pundit on Gay Power, remarked, 'it took courage to march, as we had no idea what they might do to us; your parents might spot you on the news and all hell could break loose; we look very brave, but maybe we aren't'."

Film critic Michael Bronski said the film is "more than just a compilation of reportage spliced together for release as a feature film; Bressan has orchestrated the current footage, footage from the 1970 New York and Los Angeles parades, interviews with marchers throughout the country, and even clips from Leni Riefenstahl's Nazi propaganda films into a cohesive whole that manages to inform, inspire, educate and entertain." He also opined that "focusing upon a parade/demonstration works very well since it gives a sense of immediacy, and the references to the Hillsborough murder throughout the film give anger a concrete sense of direction."

Glenn Dunks from The Film Experience said "this thoroughly unheralded documentary classic is a movie full of hugs, kisses, caresses and gyrations in the crowd; but it also opens up offers genuine moments of introspection to the very concept of pride and sexuality; it is a film where interview subjects occasionally ask harder questions than the one with the microphone; where everyone has a coming out story that sings as universally familiar and uniquely individual; where older homosexual men and women speak with heart-breaking surprise at even getting the chance to see a day like this after years of societal domestic duty and hard-fought queer independence."

Film critic Emanuel Levy stated that "by cutting from one major city to another, the film gives the impression of a united and simultaneous coast-to-coast struggle, targeted against the social ills of bigotry and oppression." He further opined that "Bressan orchestrates a diversity of life styles: lesbians, sympathetic straight families, drag queens, professionals, youths, ex-prisoners, dykes on bikes, blacks, school teachers, anti-gay dissenters; Bressan's montage presents a dialectical opposition of sound and image, giving the work a spirited tone of debate."

John Rowberry from Alternate magazine, wrote "the film's final thrust is at your intelligence and your sense of outrage. The most telling of the many floats captured carries a tower stating: 'These People Can Not Teach In Your Schools'; Shakespeare, Andre Gide, Jean-Paul Sartre, Michelangelo, Socrates, Aristotle, Simone de Beauvoir, Tennessee Williams, Hart Crane, Truman Capote, Walt Whitman, Gertrude Stein, Aubrey Beardsley, Oscar Wilde, ad intellectum. It is on this image and in the final piece of music; a paean to the overthrow of bigotry, that the film concludes."

== See also ==
- List of LGBTQ-related films of 1977
- LGBTQ rights in the United States
- LGBTQ history
- LGBTQ movements
- Pride parade
- Anti-LGBTQ rhetoric
- Timeline of LGBTQ history

== Sources ==
- Arthur Bressan (1977). Arthur Bressan / Gay USA (Video). The Emerald City. Interviewed by John Rome. Written and directed by Frank O'Dowd; produced by Frank O'Dowd & Steven J. Bie; A Truth, Justice and the American Way, Inc. Production. New York: Channel J. Archived from the original on February 3, 2021 – via Internet Archive.
- Arthur Bressan, David Pasko, Joseph Knutson (1977). Gay USA. Artists United For Gay Rights (Video). San Francisco, New York City, San Diego, Houston, Los Angeles, Chicago, Philadelphia: Frameline – via YouTube.
