= Gay Rights and Moral Panic: The Origins of America's Debate on Homosexuality =

2008 book by Fred Fejes

Gay Rights and Moral Panic
- Cover
- Author: Fred Fejes
- Original title: Gay Rights and Moral Panic: The Origins of America's Debate on Homosexuality doi:10.1057/9780230614680
- Language: English
- Subject: Gay rights, the history of gay liberation movement in the United States
- Genre: Non-fiction
- Publisher: Palgrave Macmillan
- Publication date: September 2008
- Publication place: United States
- Pages: 279
- ISBN: 978-1-4039-8069-4

Gay Rights and Moral Panic: The Origins of America's Debate on Homosexuality is a book by American multimedia journalism scholar, author, and academic Fred Fejes. It was published in 2008 by Palgrave Macmillan. The book is an examination of the pivotal referendums in 1977 and 1978 that initiated the national discussion on the rights of lesbians and gay men in the United States. Focusing particularly on the campaigns in Miami and their broader societal implications, Fejes delves into the clash between civil rights assertions and prevailing societal attitudes towards homosexuality. Through detailed analysis, the book elucidates how these early debates laid the groundwork for the ongoing discourse surrounding LGBTQ+ rights in America.

== Summary ==
The book is divided into eight chapters in which Fejes examines Anita Bryant's 1977 influential Save Our Children campaign and its significance within both the Christian Right and LGBTQ+ civil rights movements. The author explores the media's portrayal of homosexuals prior to 1977, revealing prevalent stereotypes and societal attitudes. Despite some deviations from traditional historical narratives, the book delves into the events leading up to the pivotal battle in Miami and its aftermath, detailing similar struggles in 1977 and 1978 in St. Paul, Minnesota; Wichita, Kansas; Eugene, Oregon, Seattle; the state of California and again in Miami. Fejes applies communication theory to analyze public perception and the framing of LGBTQ+ issues.

== Critical reception ==
In his review, Michael Boucai thought that the book by Fred Fejes offered a detailed chronicle of Anita Bryant's 1977 crusade and provided useful summaries of six gay-rights referendums the following year. He appreciated Fejes' scrupulous review of relevant press coverage and his impressive array of interviews with key players on both sides. Boucai noted that the book made a respectable case for the impact of Bryant's crusade in bringing many gay people out of the closet, forging stronger alliances within the LGBTQ+ community, and fostering a truly national community. He acknowledged the book's significance in highlighting the media's role in contemporary gay history and its contribution to increasing visibility and acceptance of LGBTQ+ individuals. Boucai also praised the book for shedding light on the ongoing debate surrounding gay rights and its relevance to the present day, particularly through the comparison between past and present attitudes in Miami and throughout the nation.

Peter Cava wrote:

The overall portrait Fejes weaves is thorough, copiously documented, compelling, and valuable for all who wish to deepen their knowledge of US gay history without accessing multitudinous primary sources.

William B. Turner found the book to be an important contribution to understanding the history of the post–World War II United States. He praised Fejes for shedding light on Anita Bryant's Save Our Children campaign and its significance in both the Christian Right movement and the lesbian/gay civil rights movement. Turner appreciated Fejes's approach to examining media frames and how they shaped public perception of lesbians and gay men. While he noted that the book may not fully live up to its subtitle, Turner overall considered it to be an estimable and beneficial read for historians.
