= Arthur J. Bressan Jr. =

American filmmaker (1943-1987)

- Born: May 27, 1943; Lincoln Square, Manhattan, New York City, New York, U.S.
- Died: July 29, 1987 (aged 44); New York City, New York, U.S.
- Cause of death: AIDS-related complications
- Occupation: Filmmaker
- Height: 6'4 (1.93 m)

Arthur J. Bressan Jr. (May 27, 1943 – July 29, 1987) was an American director, writer, producer, documentarian and gay pornographer, best known for pioneering independent queer cinema in the United States during the 1970s and 1980s. He wrote and directed the 1985 feature film Buddies, which was the first American film to grapple with the subject of the AIDS pandemic. Other directorial endeavors include the largely influential 1977 documentary Gay USA (the first documentary by and about LGBT people), and the 1983 feature film Abuse. He died on July 29, 1987, at the age of 44 due to an AIDS-related illness.

== Early life and young adulthood ==
Bressan was born and brought up on West 68th Street in the Lincoln Square area of Manhattan. His interest in film was sparked by his love for classic films, as well as his exposure to productions that were undertaken in New York, notably, the 1961 musical West Side Story, most of which was filmed on his street and parts of Lincoln Square. Bressan deeply admired filmmakers Frank Capra and Preston Sturges, the works of which he has noted as being hugely influential on his personal ambitions and filmmaking style. Despite his love of filmmaking, Bressan never received any formal education or training relating to it, instead acquiring his filmic skillset from personal experience. His postsecondary education was composed of time at both New York University and Iona College in New Rochelle, New York. Bressan began to live an openly gay life in the early 1970s, correlating to the start of his time in San Francisco, a city known for its vibrant queer communities.

== Filmography ==
The vast majority of Bressan's body of filmic work was concerned with gay and queer being, the bulk of which belonged to the genre of gay pornography. However, much of the pornographic imagery was interwoven with complex narratives conflicts, blurring the line between fiction film and pornography; this was relatively unconventional during the 1970s and 1980s. Below is a chronological account of Bressan's original filmography.

=== Boys (short, 1969) ===
Two gay men of vastly different temperaments, one being a laid-back cruiser and the other an intellectual, meet and grow an intimate connection.

=== Coming Out (documentary short, 1972) ===
In this ten-minute short, Bressan interviews a variety of participants in San Francisco's first gay pride parade, the 1972 Gay Freedom Day celebration, shot in 16 millimeter colour film. The celebration consisted of approximately 2000 marchers and 15000 spectators. Centering the political act of marching as the subject of the short and individuating proponents of the gay rights cause from the crowd inspired Bressan to make his longer and more elaborate 1977 documentary Gay USA. Much of the footage from this short appears in Gay USA.

=== Passing Strangers (1974) ===
Two men, Tom (Robert Carnagey) and Robert (Robert Adams), meet through means of an advertisement, both wanting to engage in a long-term relationship.

Bressan's debut feature is one of the first notable examples of his (at the time) unique tendency to integrate pornographic sequences into conventional queer narratives. Some have theorized that this habit stemmed from the active silencing of queer voices in the 1970s and 1980s, requiring pornography and queer narratives to be combined as the industries did not allow space for both as individual productions.

=== Gay USA (documentary, 1977) ===
Bressan's Gay USA, restored in 2019, was a technical and thematic elaboration upon his 1972 short documentary Coming Out. Shot in one day across five cities by twenty-five different camera operators (all under Bressan's technical supervision), the documentary mostly consists of a variety of aerial shots and close-up interviews of the participants of the various Pride celebrations across the country.

The total budget for Gay USA was around the US$8000 mark, which included the crew, equipment and the post-production phase that lasted approximately two months. Word of the film spread across various queer communities in the country, notably San Francisco, where it premiered in 1977. Harvey Milk, the first openly gay elected official in the United States, helped spread awareness for the film by selling premiere tickets at his shop, Castro Camera.

Bressan's intention for the film was to be non-threatening and educational whilst also demonstrating the stakes and risks related to being a member of the queer community. Bressan has noted the 1977 Dade County referendum vote to repeal anti-discrimination laws as his main inspiration for Gay USA. He cited that many of his friends felt ashamed of their homosexuality following the repeal of the laws, which he wished to combat by validating their existence and history. One of the main proponents of the anti-discrimination law repeal was pop singer and Save Our Children coalition president Anita Bryant, who is implicitly compared to Adolf Hitler, Joseph Stalin and Ku Klux Klan members in the film.

Gay USA contains a historical sequence that depicts the little-known genocide of queer individuals in Germany during the early stages of the Third Reich. In the wake of events such as the 1977 Dade County referendum vote, there was a growing fear amongst queer individuals that more of their fundamental freedoms would be taken away. Bressan found it important to incorporate this sequence into the film as to remind the queer population of their history, using their existing fear to motivate a more powerful progressive agenda.

Bressan submitted Gay USA to the Academy of Motion Picture Arts and Sciences in hopes of winning an Oscar in the 1977 feature documentary category. The film was not nominated.

=== Forbidden Letters (1979) ===
In his second narrative feature, Bressan depicts Richard (Richard Holt Locke), an incarcerated man, as he corresponds with his younger lover, Larry (Robert Adams), from prison by means of erotic letters. The contents of each letter track an aspect of their sexual and romantic history through coloured softcore porn sequences, with the rest of the film, which takes place in the present, in black and white. The use of the black and white filter during scenes in which the men are apart emphasizes the joy and fulfillment they experienced prior to Richard's incarceration.

=== Abuse (1983) ===
Abuse follows Thomas (Raphael Sbarge), a teenager who is subjected to brutal physical harm from his parents. He meets Larry (Richard Ryder), a documentarian who is working on a film about physical child abuse. The two fall in love, presenting an ethical and personal conflict for Larry, who holds much of the power in the relationship.

=== Pleasure Beach (1983) ===
Lifeguards Steve (Johnny Dawes), a closeted queer, and Todd (Michael Christopher), a comfortably gay man, grow a fondness for one another. Steve is reluctant to engage with Todd sexually since he is in a relationship with a woman.

=== Juice (1984) ===
Juice follows an unnamed gay porn photographer (Michael Christopher) who searches for models over the course of a day in New York City.

=== Daddy Dearest (1984) ===
Gay porn director Edward Thompson (Daniel Holt) works on a triple-X all-male porn film but finds himself distracted by sexual fantasies about many of the men in his life. Through this film, Bressan wished to parody the behind-the-scenes world of the gay pornography industry.

=== Buddies (1985) ===
Buddies is Bressan's last project prior to his death in 1987. It follows reserved gay man David (David Schachter) who volunteers to be a ‘buddy’ for an AIDS patient through his gay center, who ends up being witty and strongly opinionated Robert (Geoff Edholm). Although the two men are of vastly different temperaments, they grow a strong bond and are able to nurture each other's shortcomings.

Buddies premiered at the Castro Theatre as a benefit for the San Francisco International LGBTQ Film Festival (now the Frameline Film Festival) on September 12, 1985. It was shot over the course of nine days with a runtime of eighty-one minutes and a budget of around US$27,000. It is the first American film to grapple with the AIDS pandemic as a subject. Shortly after the film's premiere, US president Ronald Reagan said the word ‘AIDS’ for the first time publicly, over four years after the crisis began.

Being of novel and heavy subject matter, Buddies did not appeal to general audiences of its time. It quickly fell out of public consciousness until it was restored and re-released in the late 2010s by the Bressan Project, run by Bressan's sister Roe Bressan and LGBTQ film historian Jenni Olson, in collaboration with Vinegar Syndrome and Frameline Distribution. Star Geoff Edholm (Robert) died of AIDS in 1989, shortly after Bressan died of the same illness in 1987. Star David Schachter (David) is now a prominent AIDS and queer activist.

"Every once in a while you get the chance to make a statement on film that has nothing to do with your career, with ego, with money - but only with the issues of life and love and death. If Buddies turns out to be my last film, it'll be a fine way to go." - Arthur J. Bressan Jr. quoted in Vito Russo's The Celluloid Closet

Copies of Abuse and Buddies are held by the Hormel Center at the San Francisco Public Library as part of a collection donated by the Frameline Film Festival.

== Other career endeavours ==
=== Education ===
Prior to committing to filmmaking full-time, Bressan worked as a high school teacher at Power Memorial Academy, as well as for the US Department of Education. During this time, he would independently produce a variety of Super 8 films.

=== Journalism ===
Bressan was engaged in a variety of journalistic endeavors. The most notable article in his body of work was in the June 1972 issue of Andy Warhol's Interview Magazine in which he interviewed his personal hero, director Frank Capra. The article was republished in a 2013 Interview Magazine Frank Capra article compilation due to the announcement of the now cancelled "It's a Wonderful Life" sequel, "It's a Wonderful Life: The Rest of the Story", in the same year (although Bressan is inexplicably credited as ‘Andrew’ Bressan in this article).

== Late life and The Bressan Project ==
As the 1980s progressed, Bressan's friends remember him growing increasingly ill and physically weak. He died of AIDS-related complications on July 29, 1987, in New York City. Although many of his films fell out of public consciousness after his death, they have received more recent acclaim due to their restoration in the late 2010s conducted by The Bressan Project, led by queer film historian Jenni Olson and Bressan's sister, Roe Bressan.

== Influence and larger themes in works ==
Bressan believed that sexual identity corresponded directly to an individual's overall identity. For this reason, the entirety of his body of work was, to varying degrees, concerned with validating queer (mostly gay, in terms of relations between two cisgender men) existence in of itself. When at parties in New York, Bressan would unapologetically introduce himself as a gay pornographer to the people he met, attempting to normalize gay culture to broader straight communities in a somewhat shocking and destabilizing manner. This was also his aim in Gay USA; through aerial shots, he wished to demonstrate that the queer community was composed of hundreds of thousands of individuals across American, which shocked many.

Although Bressan was mostly concerned with gay being in his films, he consciously and actively validated other queer subcultures, due in part to input from his lesbian female friends who felt as though they were underrepresented in everyday culture. This made him a pioneer of destabilizing the hegemonic idea of the queer as being thought of as a cisgendered man.

== Awards ==
- 1984 Gay Producers Association Award, Best Director for Pleasure Beach (HIS Video).

== See also ==
- List of male performers in gay porn films
- List of pornographic movie studios
- List of gay porn magazines
