= In My Little Corner of the World =

Studio album by Marie Osmond
- Released: July 20, 1974
- Genre: Country pop
- Label: MGM
- Producer: Sonny James

Marie Osmond chronology
Paper Roses (1973)	In My Little Corner of the World (1974)	Who's Sorry Now (1975)

Singles from In My Little Corner of the World
- 1. "In My Little Corner of the World" Released: 1974

Professional ratings
Review scores
Source	Rating
Allmusic	2/5 stars

In My Little Corner of the World is the second studio album by American country music singer Marie Osmond. It was released on MGM Records in 1974.

Marie Osmond's second album was named after the lead and only single from the album, "In My Little Corner of the World." Like Osmond's previous singles, the crossover country-pop hit, "Paper Roses," "In My Little Corner of the World" was a cover version of a major hit by Anita Bryant. Osmond's version however only peaked within the Country Top 40 and made the Bubbling Under Hot 100 charts in 1974. The album was produced by Sonny James. Recorded at Columbia Studios, Studio B Nashville, TN

The album peaked at No. 10 on the Billboard Top Country Albums chart and No. 164 on the Billboard 200 in 1974. AllMusic rated the album 2 out of 5 stars.

== Track listing ==
No.	Title	Writer(s)	Original artist	Length
1.	"In My Little Corner of the World"	Lee Pockriss (music); Bob Hilliard (lyrics)	Anita Bryant (1960)	2:48
2.	"Big Hurts Can Come (From Little White Lies)"	Carole Smith, Sonny James	Sonny James (1963)	2:27
3.	"Invisible Tears"	Henry Ned Miller, Sue Miller	The Ray Coniff Singers (1964)	2:08
4.	"I Love You So Much It Hurts"	Floyd Tillman	Jimmy Wakely (1948)	2:28
5.	"Everybody's Somebody's Fool"	Jack Keller (music); Howard Greenfield (lyrics)	Connie Francis (1960)	2:31
6.	"True Love's a Blessing"	Smith, James	Sonny James (1966)	2:19
7.	"I Love You Because"	Payne	Leon Payne (1949)	2:36
8.	"It's Just the Other Way Around"	Harry Seeberg, Ronald C. Myers		2:19
9.	"Crazy Arms"	Ralph Mooney, Chuck Seals	Ray Price (1956)	2:46
10.	"Singing the Blues"	Melvin Endsley	Guy Mitchell (1956)	2:04

== Charts ==
Album – Billboard (United States)

Chart (1974)	Peak position
US Top LPs & Tape	164
US Country Albums	10
Canada Top Albums	90

Singles – Billboard (United States)

Year	Single	Chart	Position
1974	"In My Little Corner of the World"	US Country Singles	33
1974	"In My Little Corner of the World"	US Bubbling Under Hot 100 Singles	2
