= The Anita Bryant Story =

1977 book by Anita Bryant

The Anita Bryant Story: The Survival of Our Nation's Families and the Threat of Militant Homosexuality
- Cover of the first edition
- Author: Anita Bryant
- Language: English
- Subject: Autobiography
- Published: 1977
- Publication place: United States
- Media type: Print (Hardcover and Paperback)
- Pages: 156
- ISBN: 978-0800708979

The Anita Bryant Story: The Survival of Our Nation's Families and the Threat of Militant Homosexuality is a 1977 book by Anita Bryant, in which the author provides an account of her evangelical Christian campaign against a gay rights ordinance in Dade County, Florida. The claims Bryant makes about homosexuality in the book have been described as false and unscholarly in nature.

== Reception ==
The journalist M. Stanton Evans gave The Anita Bryant Story a positive review in National Review, writing that Bryant's "frequent arguments from Scripture confirm the view that she is deeply religious but refute the libel that she is any sort of bigot." Evans welcomed Bryant's lack of regret for the consequences to her of her opposition to gay rights. Casper G. Schmidt suggested in the Journal of Psychohistory that Bryant outlined the major issues of concern to opponents of gay rights, and that she was correct in believing that repeal of the gay rights ordinance in Dade County would provoke a larger backlash against the gay rights movement.

The law professor Richard Posner wrote that while The Anita Bryant Story is not scholarly, it reflects widespread beliefs about homosexuality. Posner criticized Bryant's views, writing while the causes of a same-sex preference are not well understood, the main factors involved appear to be genetic, hormonal, developmental, or some combination thereof, not recruitment, and that Bryant's assertion that gay people can change their sexual orientation is false in most cases.

The philosopher Mark D. Jordan criticized Bryant's style of writing. He suggested that Bryant's use of "ritual repetition" made her language resemble psalmody. He viewed The Anita Bryant Story as an effort by Bryant to show her "benign intentions and reasonableness". According to Jordan, it was originally to have been titled Save Our Children: One Woman's Fight against the Sin of Homosexuality, but after the international relief organization Save the Children secured a preliminary injunction requiring the Bryant's campaign change its name from Save Our Children, the title of Bryant's book had to be changed as well.

== See also ==
- Biology and sexual orientation
- Conversion therapy
- Environment and sexual orientation
- Sexual orientation change efforts
