= Buddies (1985 film) =

- Film poster
- Directed by: Arthur J. Bressan Jr.
- Written by: Arthur J. Bressan Jr.
- Produced by: Arthur J. Bressan Jr.
- Starring: Geoff Edholm; David Schachter
- Cinematography: Carl Teitelbaum
- Edited by: Arthur J. Bressan Jr.
- Music by: Jeffrey Olmstead
- Production companies: Film and Video Workshop
- Distributed by: New Line Cinema
- Release dates: September 20, 1985 (Chicago Gay and Lesbian Film Festival)
- Running time: 81 minutes
- Country: United States
- Language: English
- Budget: $27,000 (estimated)

Buddies is a 1985 American drama film. It is the first film to deal with the AIDS pandemic, preceding the television film An Early Frost (also released in 1985). Directed by Arthur J. Bressan Jr., who died of complications from AIDS two years after the film was released, the film follows a New York City gay man in a monogamous relationship becoming a "buddy" or a volunteer friend to another gay man dying of AIDS and the friendship that develops. The film stars Geoff Edholm, David Schachter, Billy Lux, and David Rose.

== Cast ==
- Geoff Edholm as Robert Willow
- David Schachter as David Bennett
- Damon Hairston as Gym instructor
- Joyce Korn as Lynn
- Billy Lux as Edward
- David Rose as Steve
- Libby Saines as Mrs. Bennett
- Susan Schneider as Sylvia Douglas
- Tracy Vivat as Nurse

== History ==
The first widely released Hollywood film to deal with the HIV/AIDS pandemic within the United States was Longtime Companion in 1989. While news reports about the pandemic began to appear in The New York Times as early as 1981, the fact that many of the initial victims were gay or bisexual men contributed to how Hollywood and society responded. The long-standing taboo within Hollywood about depicting homosexuality played a large role in the refusal of the industry to cinematically deal with the pandemic, when it was initially treated as a "gay disease." The book The Celluloid Closet by Vito Russo, and its 1995 documentary film adaptation, tell the story of that time.

In response to the pandemic, and to Hollywood hypocrisy, Bressan wrote and directed the film Buddies in 1985, and it was shown in a handful of urban, art house movie theaters.

A 2K restoration was done by The Bressan Project and home video distributor Vinegar Syndrome in 2018 and was released on DVD and digital. Screenings were held at San Francisco's Castro Theater (where it had premiered in 1985) on June 21, 2018, and at New York's Quad Cinema starting June 22, 2018.
