= Murder of Robert Hillsborough =

1977 homophobic murder in San Francisco, U.S.

- 1977 memorial dedicated to Robert Hillsborough in San Francisco
- Location: 37.760225°N 122.420692°W; San Francisco, California, U.S.
- Date: June 22, 1977; 49 years ago
- Attack type: Murder by stabbing, hate crime (violence against LGBTQ people)
- Victim: Robert Hillsborough
- Perpetrator: John Cordova
- Motive: Anti-LGBTQ extremism homophobia
- Verdict: State charges: Cordova: Guilty
- Convictions: State convictions: Cordova: Second-degree murder,

On June 22, 1977, Robert Hillsborough, a 33-year-old American gay man, was murdered in San Francisco by John Cordova, a 19-year-old from Daly City. Cordova and three other young men followed Hillsborough to his apartment in the Mission and stabbed him fifteen times in the face and chest.

Cordova was convicted of second-degree murder and sentenced to 10 years in prison. Though Hillsborough was the nineteenth gay man to be murdered in the United States in 1977, it was his death which galvanized political mobilization amongst the LGBT community to fight for human rights. His family unsuccessfully sued anti-gay activist Anita Bryant for inciting violence against gay people.

== People involved ==
=== Robert Hillsborough ===
Robert Hillsborough (born March 10, 1944) was a gardener who took care of the greenery at a playground near San Francisco City Hall. He was known as Mr. Greenjeans by the children at the park.

=== John Cordova ===
John Cordova was a nineteen-year-old from Daly City.

== Murder ==
On the evening of June 21, 1977, Hillsborough went to a disco with his boyfriend, Jerry Taylor. Around midnight, the two left the club and drove to a drive-in hamburger joint, where a group of youths recognized them as gay. The four young men verbally attacked them and hit Hillsborough several times through an open car window. When he backed out of the parking space and headed towards home, the attackers also followed them in their car. As Hillsborough and Taylor got out of the car outside their home in the Mission District, they were attacked at the corner of Nineteenth and Lexington Streets. Taylor escaped over a high fence, but Hillsborough was knocked to the ground and beaten, and Cordova stabbed him fifteen times in the face and chest. The attackers shouted "Faggot! Faggot! Faggot!" and "This one’s for Anita!", referring to activist Anita Bryant, who was the face of the Save Our Children campaign fighting to overturn Miami's anti-discrimination law.

Neighbors called the police and an ambulance, but Hillsborough was pronounced dead three quarters of an hour after the attack, after being taken to a nearby hospital. The attackers were arrested the same day. The killer, John Cordova, was 19 at the time of the crime, the other attackers ranged from 16 to 21. Cordova and a 21-year-old were charged with murder; the first of them was sentenced to 10 years in prison, the second was acquitted, the other two members of the group were not charged as witnesses testified that they did not get out of the car.

== Reaction ==
The victim's mother, as well as Mayor George Moscone, in public statements indicated that the assassination was inspired by Anita Bryant and Senator John Briggs, a politician counting on the support of Christian fundamentalists in the fight for the governorship of California. The mayor also ordered flags in the city to be lowered to half-mast. In response to this murder, the LGBT community in San Francisco organized the largest pride march to date (Gay Freedom Day Parade) on June 26, with between 200,000 and a quarter of a million participants (some sources claim 300,000 participants). Despite police fears, both the march and Hillsborough's funeral took place without major incidents. During the march, Harvey Milk announced his intention to run for city council.

== Lawsuit ==
Robert Hillsborough's mother sued Anita Bryant, her husband, Senator Briggs and others in July for conspiring to take away Hillsborough's civil rights by unleashing a "campaign of hate, bigotry and prejudice against him and other homosexuals", but the suit was dismissed.
