= Fred Fejes =

American communication scholar

Prof. Fred Fejes
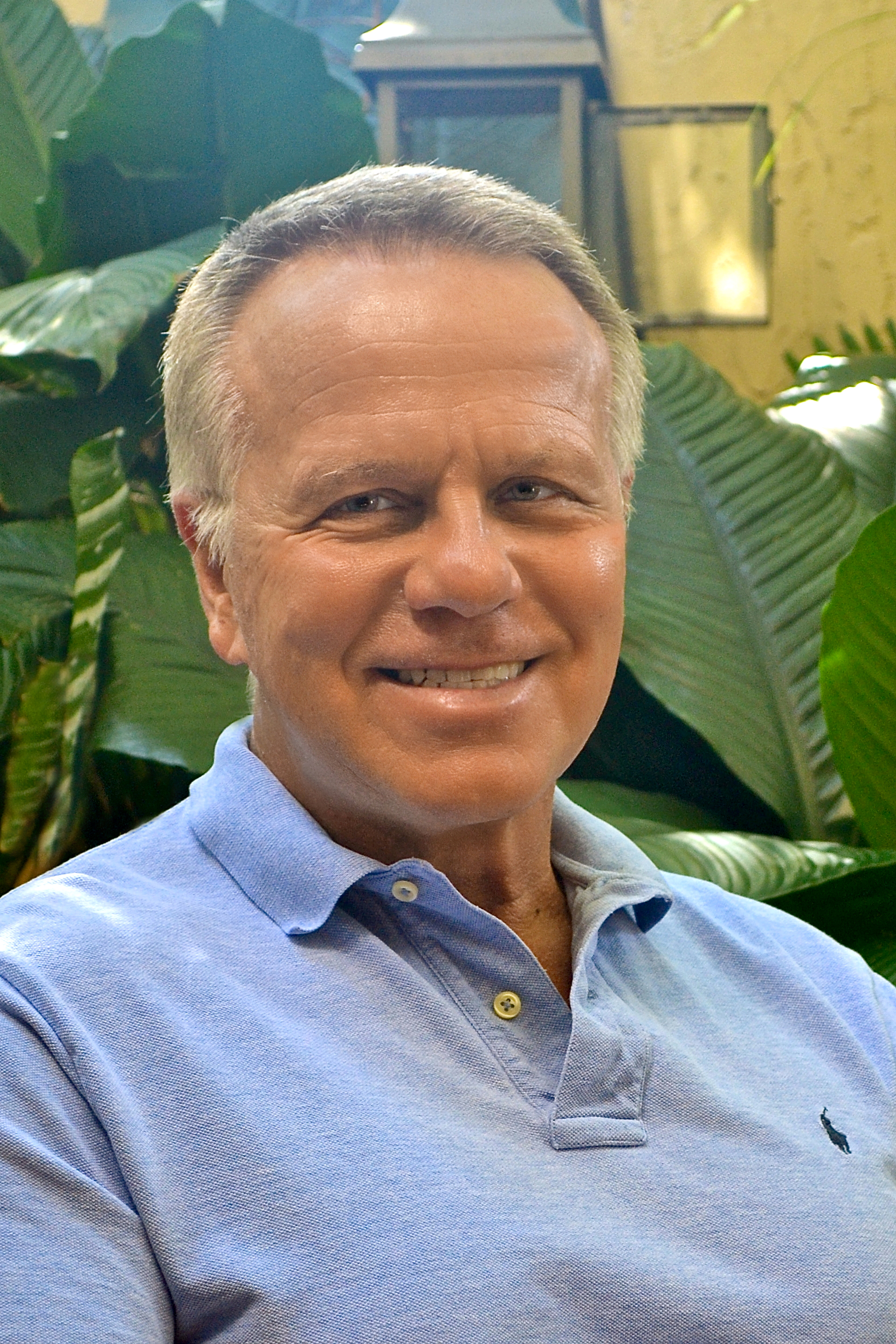
- Fejes in 2012
- Born: Fred Allan Fejes
- Occupations: Scholar; author; academic
- Years active: 1982–present
- Title: Professor emeritus
- Awards: Roy F. Aarons Award (2013) (Note: "for contributions to education and research on issues affecting the gay, lesbian, bisexual and transgendered communities.")

Academic background
- Education: A. B. (1974), PhD (1982)
- Alma mater: The Institute of Communication Research, University of Illinois Urbana-Champaign
- Thesis: Imperialism, Media, and the Good Neighbor: New Deal Foreign Policy and United States Shortwave Broadcasting to Latin America (1982)

Academic work
- Discipline: Communication studies
- Sub-discipline: Communication theory, discourse, sexuality and media
- Institutions: Florida Atlantic University
- Main interests: LGBT studies, sexuality and media, critical media studies
- Notable works: Gay Rights and Moral Panic: The Origins of America's Debate on Homosexuality (2008), Imperialism, Media and the Good Neighbor: New Deal Foreign Policy and United States Shortwave Broadcasting to Latin America (1984)

Fred Allan Fejes is an American communication scholar, author and academic. Fejes is known for his work on sexuality, media, and the history of the LGBTQ movement in America. From 2018 to 2019, he held the title of a Fulbright-Palacky Distinguished Chair at Palacky University. Fejes is the author of Gay Rights and Moral Panic: The Origins of America's Debate on Homosexuality and Imperialism, Media and the Good Neighbor: New Deal Foreign Policy and United States Shortwave Broadcasting to Latin America. In 2013, he received the Roy F. Aarons Award for "contributions to education and research on issues affecting the gay, lesbian, bisexual and transgendered communities."

== Bibliography ==
=== Books ===
- Fejes, Fred. Gay Rights and Moral Panic: The Origins of America's Debate on Homosexuality. Springer, 2016.
- Fejes, Fred The Ideology of the Information Age (Co-edited with Jennifer Daryl Slack). Ablex: 1987. (Japanese edition - Tokyo:Nihon Hyoron Sha, 1990).
- Fejes, Fred. Imperialism, Media and the Good Neighbor: New Deal Foreign Policy and United States Shortwave Broadcasting to Latin America. Ablex, 1986.

=== Articles ===
- Fejes, Fred. “The Marlin Beach Affair, From Homosexual Presence to Gay Community,” OutHistory, (2023)
- Fejes, Fred. "Making the ‘Gay’Consumer a Respectable Citizen." Sexuality and Consumption: Intersections and Entanglements, Mario Keller ed, deGuyter, 2022, 217-236.
- Fejes, Fred. "The Ageism of Sex Research." (Letter to Editor).The Gay & Lesbian Review Worldwide 27, no. 3 (2020): 6–8.
- Fejes, Fred. “Not in This Family: Gays and the Meaning of Kinship in Postwar North America”. (review) The Journal of American History, Vol. 98, (2011): 878–879.
- Fejes, Fred. “Florida,” Encyclopedia of Lesbian, Gay, Bisexual and Transgender History in America, Marc Stein, editor. Charles Scribner's and Sons, 2005.
- Fejes, Fred .“Media Studies, Encyclopedia of Lesbian, Gay, Bisexual and Transgender History in America, Marc Stein, editor. Charles Scribner's and Sons, 2005.
- Fejes, Fred. "Bent passions: Heterosexual masculinity, pornography, and gay male identity." Sexuality & Culture 6 (2002): 95–113.
- Fejes, Fred. “Market Niche at Last, Market Niche at Last, Thank God Almighty, We're a Market Niche at Last: The Political Economy of Lesbian/Gay Identity, " in Sex and Money, edited by Eileen Meehan and Ellen Marie Riordan, Minneapolis: University of Minnesota Press, 2001.
- Fejes, Fred, and Ron Lennon. "Defining the lesbian/gay community? Market research and the lesbian/gay press." Journal of Homosexuality 39, no. 1 (2000): 25–42.
- Fejes, Fred. Making a Gay Masculinity," Critical Studies in Mass Communication, 17(1) (March 2000)
- Fejes, Fred. "Murder, perversion, and moral panic: The 1954 media campaign against Miami's homosexuals and the discourse of civic betterment." Journal of the History of Sexuality 9, no. 3 (2000): 305–347.
- Fred Fejes, and Kevin Petrich. "Invisibility, homophobia and heterosexism: Lesbians, gays and the media." Critical Studies in Mass Communication, no. 10 (1993): 395–422.
- Fejes, Fred. "Masculinity and Empirical Mass Communication Research: A Review," in Men, Masculinity and the Media, edited by Steve Craig. Beverly Hills California: Sage, 1991.
- Fejes, Fred. “Lesbians, Gays and the Media: A Select Bibliography," in Gay People, Sex and the Media, edited by Michelle A. Wolf and Alfred P. Kielwasser. The Haworth Press, 1991.
- Fejes, Fred. "Critical mass communications research and media effects: The problem of the disappearing audience." Media, Culture & Society 6, no. 3 (1984): 219–232.
- Fejes, Fred. "The US in third world communications: Latin America, 1900–1945." Journalism and Communication Monographs 86 (1983).
- Fejes, Fred. "Media imperialism: An assessment." Media, Culture & Society 3, no. 3 (1981): 281–289.
- Fejes, Fred. The Growth of Multinational Advertising Agencies in Latin America," Journal of Communication, 30:4 (Autumn 1980). Translated into Spanish and reprinted under the title "Agencias de publicidad transnacionales en American Latina," Cuardernos de comunicacion (Mexico) 69 (March 1981).
- Fred Fejes, Public Policy in the Venezuelan Broadcasting Industry," Inter-American Economic Affairs, 32:4 (July 1979).
