= The World of Lonely People =

Single by Anita Bryant

from the album The World of Lonely People
- B-side: "It's Better To Cry Today Than Cry Tomorrow"
- Released: May 1964
- Genre: Pop music
- Length: 2:16
- Label: Columbia Records 43037
- Songwriter(s): Buddy Kaye, Mort Garson

Anita Bryant singles chronology
"Step By Step, Little By Little" (1962)	"The World of Lonely People" (1964)	"Welcome, Welcome Home" (1964)

"The World of Lonely People" is a song written by Buddy Kaye and Mort Garson and performed by Anita Bryant. The song reached #17 on the U.S. Adult Contemporary chart and #59 on the Billboard Hot 100 in 1964. The song appeared on her 1964 album, The World Of Lonely People.

Jimmy Justice released a version of the song as a single in February 1963 which did not chart.
