= Do You Hear What I Hear?: Christmas with Anita Bryant =

Studio album by Anita Bryant
- Released: September 1967
- Genre: Christmas
- Length: 32:32
- Labels: Columbia; CL 2720; CS 9520
- Producer: Jay Darrow

Anita Bryant chronology
Mine Eyes Have Seen the Glory (1966)	Do You Hear What I Hear?: Christmas with Anita Bryant (1967)	Anita Bryant (1968)

Do You Hear What I Hear?: Christmas with Anita Bryant is a holiday-themed studio album by Anita Bryant released by Columbia Records in late 1967, with a lead single also released for it. Its release coincided with Bryant staying at home for Christmas for the first time in seven years. The album received positive reviews after its release and made the Billboard Christmas chart at No. 25. It was later rereleased on several other formats.

== Background and recording ==
Anita Bryant was a pop and gospel singer, first getting popular in 1959 with recordings on Carlton Records. She switched labels in the early 1960s to Columbia Records and recorded with them through 1969. In 1967, Bryant recorded a Christmas album. Produced by Jay Darrow, arrangements were provided by Stan Applebaum, Arnold Goland, and Chuck Bird. It was also the first Christmas since 1960 that she would spend with her family in Oklahoma. In previous years, she had participated in Bob Hope's USO Christmas tours in Vietnam to support local troops.

== Content, release and reception ==
It contained mostly Christmas standards, including two traditional songs: "The First Noel" and "Away in a Manger". The album was released in September 1967 as a vinyl LP with 11 tracks split across two sides. The album received a positive review from the US Record World in November 1967. The publication believed that Bryant was "Singing with a newer depth" and did "compelling versions" of "O Holy Night," "Mary's Lullaby (Sleep, Baby Sleep)", and "O Come All Ye Faithful". In Canada, The Windsor Star stated that Bryant did the songs "full justice" with her "delightful voice." She made appearances on The Mike Douglas Show and The Lawrence Welk Show in November and December to promote the Christmas album. Later it was released on CD in 2017 by Sony Music, and to streaming platforms soon after.

== Chart performance and singles ==
The album debuted on the Billboard Best Bets For Christmas LP's chart, reaching No. 25 during its five-week run on it. "Do You Hear What I Hear?" and "Away in a Manger" were lifted from the album to form a single, released on November 6, 1967. It was listed among Billboard's Christmas Spotlights, and was also given a four-star rating by Record World.

== Track listing ==
Side one
No.	Title	Writer(s)	Length
1.	"Do You Hear What I Hear?"	Gloria Shayne Baker; Noël Regney	3:08
2.	"In a Humble Place"	Gloria Shayne Baker	2:45
3.	"The First Noel"	Traditional	1:56
4.	"Mary's Lullaby (Sleep, Baby Sleep)"	Noël Regney	3:43
5.	"The Story of Christmas"	Lor Crane; Desiree Troiano	2:03
Total length:			13:35

Side two
No.	Title	Writer(s)	Length
1.	"Silent Night, Holy Night"	Franz Xaver Gruber; Joseph Mohr	2:39
2.	"O Little Town of Bethlehem"	Phillips Brooks; Lewis Redner	4:05
3.	"It Came Upon a Midnight Clear"	Edmund Sears; Richard Storrs Willis	3:21
4.	"O Holy Night"	Adolphe Adam; Placide Cappeau	4:27
5.	"O Come All Ye Faithful"	John Francis Wade; Frederick Oakeley	2:06
6.	"Away in a Manger"	Traditional	2:19
Total length:			18:57

== Charts ==
Chart performance for Christmas with Anita Bryant
Chart (1967)	Peak position
US Billboard Christmas LP's	25

== Personnel ==
All credits are adapted from the liner notes of Do You Hear What I Hear?: Christmas with Anita Bryant.

- Anita Bryant – vocals
- Jay Darrow – producer, liner notes
- Stan Applebaum, (tracks: A1) – arranger, conductor
- Arnold Goland, (tracks: A2–A5) – arranger, conductor
- Chuck Bird, (tracks: B1–B6) – arranger, conductor
- Frank Laico – recording engineer
- Stan Weiss – recording engineer
- Don Hunstein – cover photography

== Release history ==
Release history and formats for Do You Hear What I Hear?: Christmas with Anita Bryant
Region	Date	Format	Label	Ref.
United States	September 1967	LP; Vinyl	Columbia	
Canada	Late 1967	LP; Vinyl	Columbia	
United States	1971	LP; Vinyl; Reissue	Harmony	
US and worldwide	2017	CDr; streaming; digital	Sony Music	
