= My Little Corner of the World =

Single by Anita Bryant

from the album In My Little Corner of the World
- B-side: "Anyone Would Love You"
- Released: June 1960
- Genre: Pop
- Length: 2:40
- Label: Carlton Records 530
- Songwriters: Bob Hilliard, Lee Pockriss
- Producer: Lew Douglas

Anita Bryant singles chronology
"Paper Roses" (1960)	"My Little Corner of the World" (1960)	"One of the Lucky Ones" (1960)

"My Little Corner of the World" (sometimes recorded as "In My Little Corner of the World") is a 1960 love song with music written by Lee Pockriss and lyrics by Bob Hilliard.

== Anita Bryant version ==
It was first recorded by singer Anita Bryant in 1960, as "In My Little Corner of the World", and released on the album of the same name. Bryant's version reached number 10 on the Billboard Hot 100 in 1960.

== Marie Osmond version ==
It was also recorded by singer Marie Osmond in 1974, again as "In My Little Corner of the World", as the song of her album that also bears the same title. This version was released as a single, and reached the Country Top 40 chart.

== Other versions ==
The song has since been recorded by various artists, including:

- Welsh singer Maureen Evans in 1961.
- The song was recorded by Connie Smith for the 1966 album Born to Sing.
- The song was recorded by the indie-rock band Yo La Tengo for their 1997 album I Can Hear the Heart Beating as One. This version was used on, and inspired the title of, the 2002 soundtrack album for the television show Gilmore Girls, Our Little Corner of the World: Music from Gilmore Girls.
- The song was recorded and released in July 2017 as a backing track for an Air New Zealand inflight safety video. This reinterpreted version was recorded by NZ artist Gin Wigmore (Island Aust./UMA).
