= Anita Bryant =

American singer and Christian activist (1940–2024)

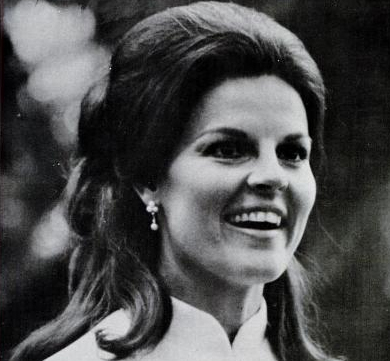
- Bryant in the January 1971 issue of Billboard
- Born: Anita Jane Bryant; March 25, 1940; Barnsdall, Oklahoma, U.S.
- Died: December 16, 2024 (aged 84); Edmond, Oklahoma, U.S.
- Occupations: Singer; activist
- Years active: 1956–2016 (Note: Bryant released her last record in 1985 and gave her last public performance in December 2016 at Oklahoma Governor Mary Fallin's Christmas Party.)
- Spouses: Bob Green (m. 1960; div. 1980) Charlie Dry (m. 1990; died 2024)
- Children: 4
- Musical career
- Genres: Pop; Christian
- Instruments: Vocals
- Labels: Carlton; Columbia; London; Word

Anita Jane Bryant (March 25, 1940 – December 16, 2024) was an American Christian female singer. She had three top 20 hits in the United States in the early 1960s, the biggest of which was "Paper Roses". The three singles also earned gold disc status. Bryant recorded a total of 23 studio albums, three of which made the Billboard 200 and an additional one made the Christmas chart in 1965. She was the 1958 Miss Oklahoma beauty pageant second runner-up, and a brand ambassador for the Florida Citrus Commission from 1969 to 1980. For a three-year period in the late 1970s, Bryant was a Christian opponent of gay rights.

From 1977 to 1980, Bryant was an outspoken opponent of gay rights in the United States. In 1977, she ran the Save Our Children campaign to repeal a local ordinance in Miami-Dade County, Florida that outlawed discrimination on the basis of sexual orientation. The campaign resulted in a 69% majority vote to repeal the ordinance in 1977 (which Dade County restored in 1998). Throughout the country, supporters of gay rights condemned Bryant for her campaign. Assisted by prominent figures in music, film, and television, they retaliated by boycotting the orange juice that she promoted and advocating for her to be blacklisted. Her contract with the Florida Citrus Commission ended three years later. This, as well as her later divorce from Bob Green, left her financially insolvent, and she filed for bankruptcy twice.

== Early life ==
Bryant was born in Barnsdall, Oklahoma, on March 25, 1940, the daughter of Lenora Annice Berry and Warren G. Bryant. After her parents divorced, her father went into the U.S. Army and her mother went to work as a clerk for Tinker Air Force Base. She began singing at the age of 2 at the First Baptist church in Barnsdall, with "Jesus Loves Me". She was singing onstage at the age of six, at local fairgrounds in Oklahoma. She sang occasionally on radio and television, and was invited to audition when Arthur Godfrey's talent show came to town, eventually winning the contest. At age 12, she had her television show The Anita Bryant Show, which aired on WKY (now KFOR-TV).

Bryant became Miss Oklahoma in 1958, after graduating from Tulsa's Will Rogers High School, and was second runner-up in the 1959 Miss America pageant in September 1958.

In 1960, Bryant married Bob Green (1931–2012), a Miami disc jockey, with whom she eventually raised four children. They divorced in 1980.

== Career ==
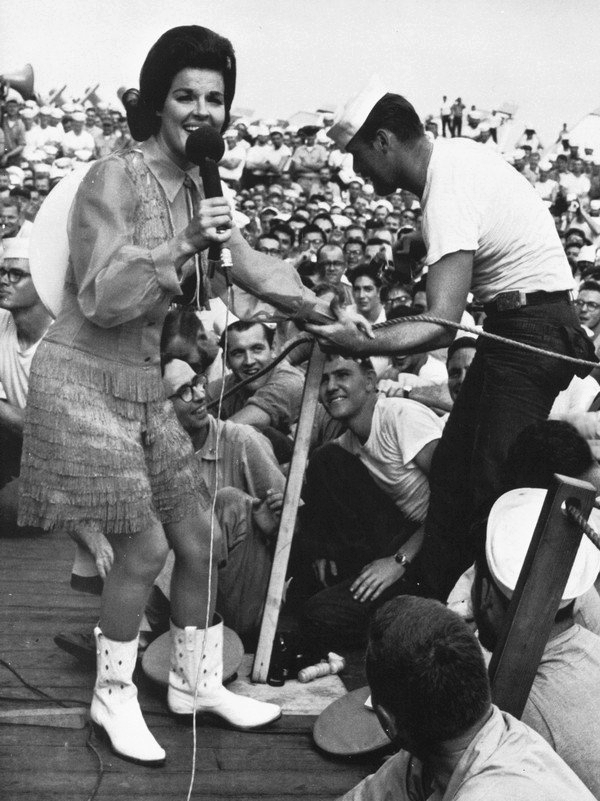
Anita Bryant with a sailor during a Bob Hope USO show on the USS Ticonderoga in 1965

Bryant appeared early in her career on the NBC interview program Here's Hollywood and on the same network's The Ford Show, starring Tennessee Ernie Ford.

Bryant released several albums on the Carlton and Columbia labels. Her first album, Anita Bryant, which was released in 1959, contained the hit single "Till There Was You" and songs from other Broadway shows. Her second album, Hear Anita Bryant in Your Home Tonight (1961), contains "Paper Roses" and "Wonderland by Night", as well as several songs that first appeared in her singles. Her third album, In My Little Corner of the World, also in 1961, contains the title song and other songs that have to do with places around the world, including "Canadian Sunset" and "I Love Paris". Bryant's compilation album, Greatest Hits (1963), contains both her original Carlton hits (because Columbia purchased all the masters from Carlton) plus sides from her Columbia recordings, including "Paper Roses" and "Step by Step, Little by Little", and received positive reviews thereafter. In 1964, she released The World of Lonely People, containing, in addition to the title song, "Welcome, Welcome Home" and a new rendition of "Little Things Mean a Lot", arranged by Frank Hunter. Bryant also released several albums of religious music with Word Records.

Bryant had a moderate pop hit with the song "Till There Was You" (1959, US No. 30), from the Broadway production The Music Man. She also had three hits that reached the Top 20 in the U.S.: "Paper Roses" (1960, US No. 5, and covered by Marie Osmond 13 years later), "In My Little Corner of the World" (1960, US No. 10), and "Wonderland by Night" (1961, US No. 18), originally a hit for Bert Kaempfert. "Paper Roses", "In My Little Corner of the World", and "Till There Was You", each sold over one million copies, and were awarded a gold disc by the RIAA.

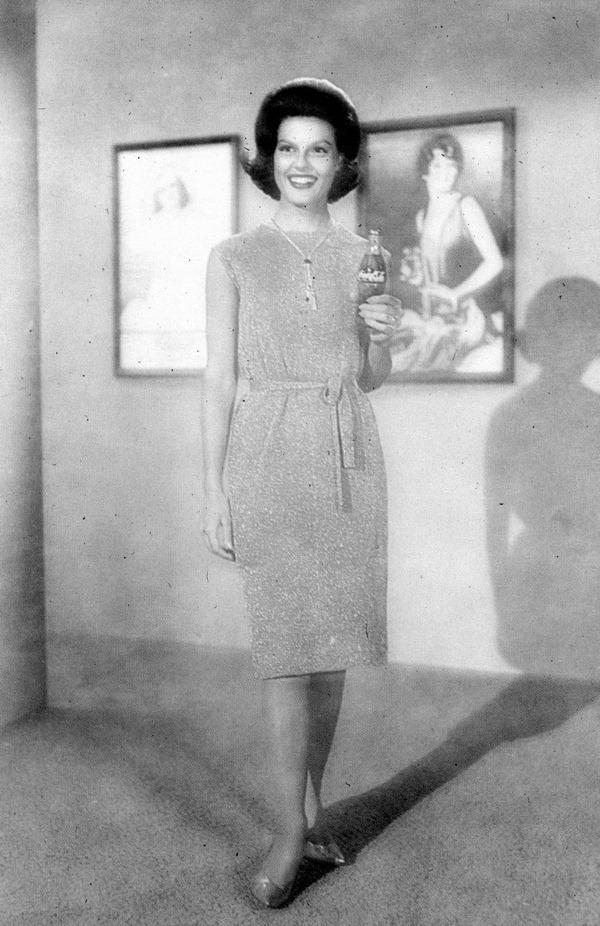
Bryant during a photoshoot for Coca-Cola

From 1961 until 1968, Bryant frequently joined Bob Hope on holiday tours for the United Service Organizations. She again traveled with Hope for televised shows during the Vietnam War. Bryant was given the Silver Medallion Award from the National Guard for "outstanding service by an entertainer", and the Veterans of Foreign Wars Leadership Gold Medallion.

Between 1964 and 1969, Bryant performed at multiple White House functions, including both the Democratic Convention in Chicago and the Miami Republican Convention in 1968. She was nominated for two Grammy Awards: best sacred performance and best spiritual performance.

In 1967, with I Believe she moved towards gospel which would also characterize the music of her other albums.

In 1969, Bryant became a spokeswoman for the Florida Citrus Commission, and nationally televised commercials featured her singing "Come to the Florida Sunshine Tree" and stating the commercials' tagline: "Breakfast without orange juice is like a day without sunshine." (Later, the slogan became, "It isn't just for breakfast anymore!") In addition during that time, she appeared in advertisements for Coca-Cola, Kraft Foods, Holiday Inn, and Tupperware. In the 1970s, Bryant was teamed up with the Disney Character "Orange Bird", with whom she appeared in several orange juice commercials. She also sang the Orange Bird Song and narrated the Orange Bird record album, with music written by the Sherman Brothers. She also published her cookbook, Bless This Food: The Anita Bryant Family Cookbook, described as "Much more than a cookbook, this is the story of a family devoted to Christ."

Bryant sang "The Battle Hymn of the Republic" during the half-time show of Super Bowl V in 1971, and at the graveside services for President of the United States Lyndon B. Johnson in 1973. She also co-hosted the televised segment of the Orange Bowl Parade for nine years.

Bryant hosted a two-hour television special, The Anita Bryant Spectacular, in March 1980. She recounted her autobiography, appeared in medleys of prerecorded songs, and interviewed Pat Boone. The West Point Glee Club and General William Westmoreland participated.

== Anti-gay rights activism ==
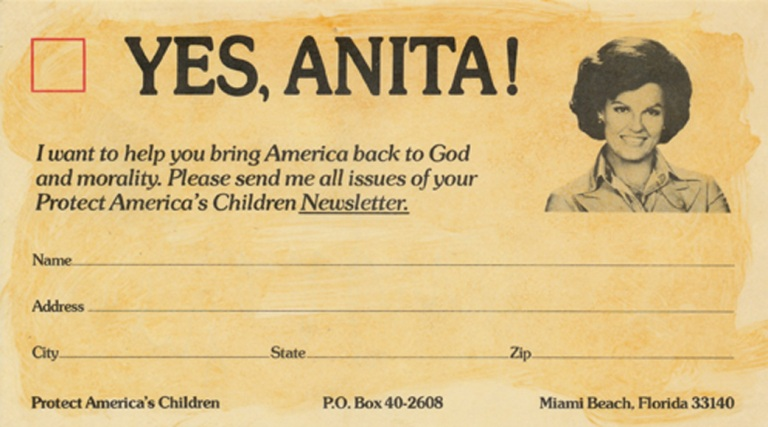
Fundraising card for the Save Our Children campaign

In 1977, Dade County, Florida, passed an ordinance sponsored by Bryant's former friend Ruth Shack that prohibited discrimination on the basis of sexual orientation. Bryant led a highly publicized campaign to repeal the ordinance, as the leader of a coalition named Save Our Children. She was especially concerned that the ordinance risked authorizing homosexual people to work in Christian schools and become role-models, because her own children were enrolled there. The campaign was based on conservative Christian beliefs regarding the sinfulness of homosexuality and the threat of homosexual recruitment of children and child molestation. Bryant stated:

What these people really want, hidden behind obscure legal phrases, is the legal right to propose to our children that theirs is an acceptable alternate way of life. [...] I will lead such a crusade to stop it as this country has not seen before.

She also perpetuated the idea of the gay community 'recruiting' children through child abuse to become homosexual themselves. When Shack and other leaders refused to vote in opposition to the ordinance as per her request, she pleaded with families directly "The recruitment of our children is absolutely necessary for the survival and growth of homosexuality... for since homosexuals cannot reproduce, they must recruit, must freshen their ranks."

The campaign marked the beginning of an organized opposition to gay rights that spread across the nation. Jerry Falwell went to Miami to help Bryant. She made the following statements during the campaign: "As a mother, I know that homosexuals cannot biologically reproduce children; therefore, they must recruit our children" and "If gays are granted rights, next we'll have to give rights to prostitutes and to people who sleep with St. Bernards and to nail biters." She also said, "All America and all the world will hear what the people have said, and with God's continued help we will prevail in our fight to repeal similar laws throughout the nation."

The name of the campaign had to be changed to "Protect America's Children" because of legal action by the Save the Children foundation.

=== Victory and defeat ===
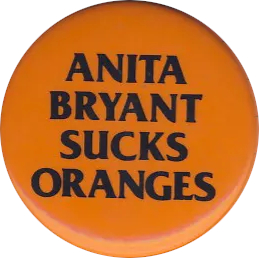
An anti-Bryant campaign button in support of a boycott of the Save Our Children campaign for which she served as spokesperson

On June 7, 1977, Bryant's campaign led to a repeal of the anti-discrimination ordinance by a margin of 69 to 31 percent. However, the success of Bryant's campaign galvanized her opponents, and the gay community retaliated against her by forming the Coalition for Human Rights and the Miami Victory Campaign, which organized a boycott of orange juice. Gay bars all over North America stopped serving screwdrivers and replaced them with the "Anita Bryant Cocktail", which was made with vodka and apple juice. Additionally, merchandise – such as buttons, bumper stickers, and T-shirts with slogans like "A day without human rights is like a day without sunshine" – was sold to push the anti-discrimination movement further. Sales and proceeds went to gay rights activists to help fund their fight against Bryant and her campaign.

In 1977, Florida legislators approved a measure prohibiting gay adoption. The ban was overturned more than 30 years later when, on November 25, 2008, Miami-Dade Circuit Court Judge Cindy S. Lederman declared it unconstitutional.

External videos
- Anita Bryant's Pie to the Face, from NBCUniversal Archives

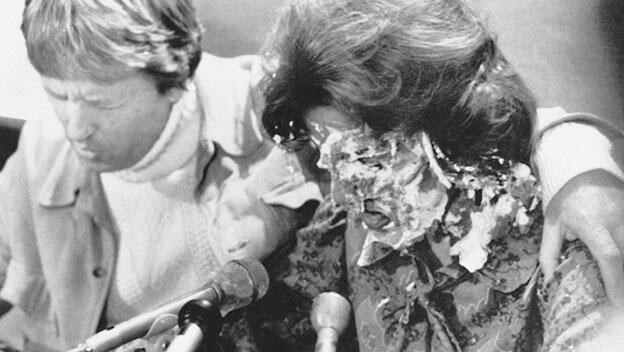
Bryant (right) with face covered in pie, October 14, 1977

While visiting the Iowa Public Broadcasting Network studios in Des Moines on October 14, 1977, Bryant repeatedly stated she "loves homosexuals, but hates their sin". The appearance was interrupted when Bryant became one of the first people to be publicly "pied" as part of a political protest, perpetrated by Thom L. Higgins. Bryant quipped "At least it's a fruit pie", a pun on the derogatory "fruit" for a gay man and a reference to her work as a sponsor for fruit companies. While covered in pie after the assault, she began to pray to God to forgive the activist "for his deviant lifestyle" before bursting into tears as the cameras continued rolling. Bryant's husband said that he would not retaliate, but followed the protesters outside and threw a pie at them. By this time, gay activists ensured that the boycott on Florida orange juice had become more prominent and it was supported by many celebrities, including Jane Fonda, Paul Williams, and Vincent Price (he joked in a television interview that Oscar Wilde's A Woman of No Importance referred to her). Johnny Carson also made Bryant a regular target of ridicule in his nightly monologues. In 1978, Bryant and Bob Green told the story of their campaign in the book At Any Cost. The gay community continued to regard Bryant's name as synonymous with bigotry and homophobia. However, at the same time, her name became a call to action for gay rights activists, and motivated many to picket her events, host anti-Bryant protests across the country, and increase attendance in and frequency of pride marches.

Bryant led several more campaigns around the country to repeal local anti-discrimination ordinances, including campaigns in St. Paul, Minnesota; Wichita, Kansas; and Eugene, Oregon. In 1978, her success led to the Briggs Initiative in California, which would have made pro-gay statements regarding homosexual people or homosexuality by any public school employee cause for dismissal. Grassroots liberal organizations, chiefly in Los Angeles and the San Francisco Bay Area, organized to defeat the initiative. Days before the election, the California Democratic Party opposed the proposed legislation. President Jimmy Carter, Governor Jerry Brown, former president Gerald Ford, and former governor (and future President) Ronald Reagan—then planning a run for the presidency—all voiced opposition to the initiative, and it ultimately suffered a massive defeat at the polls.

In 1998, the Miami-Dade County Commission reinstated the ordinance protecting individuals from discrimination on the basis of sexual orientation, by a narrow 7–6 vote. In 2002, a ballot initiative to repeal the 1998 law, called Amendment 14, was voted down by 56 percent of the voters. The Florida statute forbidding gay adoption was upheld in 2004 by a federal appellate court against a constitutional challenge but was overturned by a Miami-Dade circuit court in November 2008.

== Career decline and bankruptcies ==
The fallout from Bryant's political activism caused irreparable damage to her business and entertainment career, with her obituary in The Oklahoman framing her 1978 Playboy interview as a turning point in her career. Even earlier in February 1977, the Singer Corporation rescinded an offer to sponsor an upcoming weekly variety show because of the "extensive national publicity arising from [Bryant's] controversial political activities."

In 1978, while a member of a Baptist church, she ran for vice president of the Southern Baptist Convention, but lost. Several leaders disagreed with how she rejected civil rights for gay people.

Bryant's marriage to Bob Green also failed at that time; she divorced him in 1980, citing emotional abuse and latent suicidal thoughts. Green refused to accept this, claiming his fundamentalist religious beliefs did not recognize civil divorce and that "in God's eyes", she was still his wife.

Many Christian fundamentalist audiences and venues shunned Bryant after her divorce. Because she was no longer invited to appear at their events, she lost a major source of income. The Florida Citrus Commission also allowed her contract to lapse after the divorce, stating that Bryant was "worn out" as a spokesperson.

Bryant rapidly became the butt of jokes, as her image shifted. The decline of her reputation was aided by Tonight Show host Johnny Carson, and other comedians and talk-show hosts as they regularly mocked her to the general public. This led to her endorsements being cancelled and sponsors dropping her, as she became viewed as a liability.

Bryant and three of her four children moved from Miami to Selma, Alabama and later to Atlanta, Georgia. In a 1980 Ladies' Home Journal article she said, "The church needs to wake up and find some way to cope with divorce and women's problems." She also expressed some sympathy for feminist aspirations, given her own experiences of emotional abuse within her previous marriage. Bryant also commented on her somewhat relaxed anti-gay views, saying "I'm more inclined to say live and let live, just don't flaunt it or try to legalize it." In a 2012 interview, her son Robert Green, Jr. said "she would be putting a lot more energy into fighting gay rights if she still felt as strongly."

Bryant appeared in Michael Moore's 1989 documentary film Roger & Me, in which she is interviewed and travels to Flint, Michigan, as part of the effort to help revitalize its devastated local economy.

Bryant married her second husband, Charlie Hobson Dry, in 1990. The couple tried to reestablish her music career in a series of small venues, including Pigeon Forge, Tennessee, where they opened Anita Bryant's Music Mansion. The establishment combined Bryant's performances of her successful songs from early in her career with a "lengthy segment in which she preached her Christian beliefs". The venture was not successful and the Music Mansion, which had missed meeting payrolls at times, filed for bankruptcy in 2001 with Bryant and Dry leaving several employees and creditors unpaid. They remained married until his death in April 2024, eight months before Bryant's death.

Bryant also spent part of the 1990s in Branson, Missouri, where the state and federal governments both filed liens claiming more than $116,000 in unpaid taxes. Bryant and Dry had also filed for Chapter 11 bankruptcy in Arkansas in 1997 after piling up bills from a failed Anita Bryant show in Eureka Springs; among the debts were more than $172,000 (equivalent to about $345,000 in 2025) in unpaid state and federal taxes.

In 1996, Bryant stated that she was happy to no longer be working in show business.

== Later life ==
In 2005, Bryant returned to Barnsdall to attend the town's 100th anniversary celebration and to have a street renamed in her honor. In 2006, she founded Anita Bryant Ministries International in Oklahoma City. In 2011, she defended her anti-gay activism saying "I did the right thing" and "I never regretted what I did."

In 2021, Bryant's granddaughter came out publicly on an episode of Slate's One Year podcast series by announcing her pending marriage to a woman, although she was having difficulty deciding whether she should invite her grandmother to the ceremony.

Bryant died from cancer at her home in Edmond, Oklahoma, on December 16, 2024, at the age of 84. Her death was announced by her family on January 9, 2025.

== In popular culture ==
Bryant is a frequently portrayed character at drag shows across the United States.

=== Music ===
Bryant's name has frequently been invoked as a prototypical example of opposition to LGBT rights. When Elton John was criticized for touring Russia in 1979, he responded: "I wouldn't say I won't tour in America because I can't stand Anita Bryant". In his song "Mañana", Jimmy Buffett sings "I hope Anita Bryant never ever does one of my songs". In 1978, David Allan Coe recorded the song "Fuck Aneta Briant" [sic] on his album Nothing Sacred. California punk rock band Dead Kennedys referenced Bryant in their song "Moral Majority" from their 1981 EP In God We Trust, Inc.

In 1977, the Dutch levenslied singer Zangeres Zonder Naam wrote the protest song "Luister Anita" ("Listen Up, Anita") on the occasion of the protest night "Miami Nightmare", organized in the Amsterdam Concertgebouw. The nightly concert was intended to raise funds for an advertisement in Time, in which the Dutch nation was to call on the American people to protect the rights of minorities. In the song, Zangeres Zonder Naam compared Anita Bryant to Hitler and called on gays to fight for their rights. The song became an integral part of her repertoire and cemented her status as a cult figure among Dutch gays.

=== Literature ===
Steve Gerber, in his Howard the Duck for Marvel Comics, made an organization called the S.O.O.F.I. (Save Our Offspring from Indecency) whose leader appears to be Anita Bryant. Although it was not explicitly stated, even The New York Times called the implication "transparent".

Armistead Maupin, in his 1980 novel More Tales of the City, used Anita Bryant's "Save Our Children" campaign to prompt a principal character to come out of the closet.

=== Screen ===
Bryant was regularly lampooned on Saturday Night Live, sometimes with her politics as the target, sometimes her reputation as a popular, traditional entertainer known for her commercials as the target, and sometimes targeting a combination of the two. Her name was also a frequent punchline on The Gong Show, such as the time host/producer Chuck Barris joked that Bryant was releasing a new Christmas album called Gay Tidings. Some references were less overtly political, but equally critical. In the film Airplane! (1980), Leslie Nielsen's character, upon seeing a large number of passengers become violently ill, vomit, and have uncontrollable flatulence, remarked: "I haven't seen anything like this since the Anita Bryant concert." Other television shows that targeted her were Soap, Designing Women, and The Golden Girls. She was also the target of mockery in the RiffTrax short Drugs Are Like That.

Bryant appears in archive footage as a principal antagonist in the 2008 American biographical film Milk, about the life of gay rights activist and politician Harvey Milk. She was also portrayed as the principal antagonist in the 2011 play Anita Bryant Died for Your Sins.

In May 2013, producers announced plans for a biographical HBO film based on Bryant's life to star Uma Thurman, with a script from gay screenwriter Chad Hodge. Long languishing in development, as of 2019, Ashley Judd and Neil Patrick Harris have been attached to the project.

Archive footage of Bryant appears in The Gospel of Eureka, a 2018 documentary about the lives of LGBT individuals and evangelical Christians in Eureka Springs, Arkansas.

=== Stage ===
Bryant was lampooned in the 2016 play Anita Bryant's Playboy Interview, based on her 1978 magazine piece.

She is also the subject of The Loneliest Girl in the World, a musical that premiered at Diversionary Theatre in San Diego in mid-2018.

== Writing ==
Mark D. Jordan has written: "Many of her public statements, including her books, were ghostwritten by others, and there is internal reason to conclude that the most political books were pasted together by several hands from various sources."

- Mine Eyes Have Seen the Glory (Old Tappan, New Jersey: Fleming H. Revell, 1970)
- Amazing Grace (Old Tappan, New Jersey: Fleming H. Revell, 1971)
- Bless This House (Old Tappan, New Jersey: Fleming H. Revell, 1972)
- Bless This Food: The Anita Bryant Family Cookbook (New York: Doubleday, 1975)
- The Anita Bryant Story: The Survival of Our Nation's Families and the Threat of Militant Homosexuality (Old Tappan, New Jersey: Fleming H. Revell, 1977)
- A New Day (1996)

With Bob Green

- Fishers of Men (Old Tappan, New Jersey: Fleming H. Revell, 1973)
- Light My Candle (Old Tappan, New Jersey: Fleming H. Revell, 1974)
- Running the Good Race (Old Tappan, New Jersey: Fleming H. Revell, 1976), fitness guidance
- Raising God's Children (Old Tappan, New Jersey: Fleming H. Revell, 1977)
- At Any Cost (1978)

== Discography ==
Studio albums

- Anita Bryant (1959)
- Hear Anita Bryant in Your Home Tonight! (1960)
- In My Little Corner of the World (1961)
- Kisses Sweeter Than Wine (1961)
- Abiding Love (1962)
- In a Velvet Mood (1962)
- The ABC Stories of Jesus (1962)
- As Long As He Needs Me (1963)
- The Country's Best (1963)
- The World of Lonely People (1964)
- The Best of Johnny Desmond & Anita Bryant at Jubilee 1964 (1964)
- I Believe (1965)
- Mine Eyes Have Seen the Glory (1966)
- Do You Hear What I Hear?: Christmas with Anita Bryant (1967)
- How Great Thou Art (1968)
- In Remembrance of You (1968)
- Abide with Me (1970)
- Naturally (1972)
- You'll Never Walk Alone (1972)
- The Miracle of Christmas (1972)
- Battle Hymn of the Republic (1973)
- Old Fashioned Prayin' (1975)
- Anita Bryant's All-Time Favorite Hymns (1975)
- Anita with Love (1985)

== Works cited ==
=== Books ===
- Bryant, Anita; Green, Bob (1978). At Any Cost. Grand Rapids, Michigan, US: Fleming H. Revell. ISBN 978-0800709402.
- Bryant, Anita (1992). A New Day. Nashville, TN: Broadman. ISBN 9780805453522.
- Clendinen, Dudley; Nagourney, Adam (2013). Out For Good: The Struggle to Build a Gay Rights Movement in America. Simon and Schuster. ISBN 9781476740713.
- Gillon, Steven M. (2012). The American Paradox: A History of the United States Since 1945. Cengage Learning. ISBN 978-1133309857.
- Johnson, Emily S. (March 28, 2019). This Is Our Message: Women's Leadership in the New Christian Right. Oxford, New York: Oxford University Press. ISBN 9780190618933. Archived from the original on December 2, 2024.
- Jordan, Mark D. (2011). Recruiting Young Love: How Christians Talk about Homosexuality. University of Chicago Press.
- Lane, Stephen (2018). No Sanctuary: Teachers and the School Reform That Brought Gay Rights to the Masses. University Press of New England. p. 70. ISBN 9781512603156.
- Luther Hillman, Betty (2015). Dressing for the Culture Wars: Style and the Politics of Self-Presentation in the 1960s And 1970s. University of Nebraska Press.
- Marcus, Eric (2002). Making Gay History: The Half-Century Fight for Lesbian and Gay Equal Rights. New York City: Harper. ISBN 978-0-06-093391-3.
- Murrells, Joseph (1978). The Book of Golden Discs (2nd ed.). London: Barrie and Jenkins Ltd. ISBN 978-0-214-20512-5.
- Tin, Louis-Georges (2003). Dictionary of Homophobia: A Global History of Gay & Lesbian Experience. Arsenal Pulp Press. ISBN 978-1-55152-229-6.
- Tyson, Lois (1999). Critical Theory Today: A User-friendly Guide. Taylor & Francis.
- Winston, Diane (2012). The Oxford Handbook of Religion and the American News Media. OUP USA. ISBN 9780195395068.
