= National Register of Historic Places listings in Bradford County, Florida =

Location of Bradford County in Florida

This is a list of the National Register of Historic Places listings in Bradford County, Florida.

This is intended to be a complete list of the properties and districts on the National Register of Historic Places in Bradford County, Florida, United States. The locations of National Register properties and districts for which the latitude and longitude coordinates are included below, may be seen in a map.

There are 3 properties and districts listed on the National Register in the county.

This National Park Service list is complete through NPS recent listings posted March 21, 2025.

Contents: Counties in Florida (non-linked contain no National Register listings)
Alachua - Baker - Bay - Bradford - Brevard - Broward - Calhoun - Charlotte - Citrus - Clay - Collier - Columbia - DeSoto - Dixie - Duval - Escambia - Flagler - Franklin - Gadsden - Gilchrist - Glades - Gulf - Hamilton - Hardee - Hendry - Hernando - Highlands - Hillsborough (Tampa) - Holmes - Indian River - Jackson - Jefferson - Lafayette - Lake - Lee - Leon - Levy - Liberty - Madison - Manatee - Marion - Martin - Miami-Dade (Miami) - Monroe - Nassau - Okaloosa - Okeechobee - Orange - Osceola - Palm Beach - Pasco - Pinellas - Polk - Putnam - St. Johns - St. Lucie - Santa Rosa - Sarasota - Seminole - Sumter - Suwannee - Taylor - Union - Volusia - Wakulla - Walton - Washington

== Current listings ==
	Name on the Register	Image	Date listed	Location	City or town	Description
1	Call Street Historic District	Call Street Historic District	December 12, 1985 (#85003329)	Bounded by Jefferson, Cherry, Madison, and Temple Streets; 29°56′37″N 82°06′30″W	Starke	
2	Old Bradford County Courthouse	Old Bradford County Courthouse	December 27, 1974 (#74000611)	209 West Call Street; 29°56′41″N 82°06′40″W	Starke	Andrews Center campus of Santa Fe College
3	Woman's Club of Starke	Woman's Club of Starke	April 18, 1997 (#97000350)	201 North Walnut Street; 29°56′42″N 82°06′35″W	Starke	Built in 1922

== See also ==
- List of National Historic Landmarks in Florida
- National Register of Historic Places listings in Florida
