= CDC (disambiguation) =

The Centers for Disease Control and Prevention is the national public health agency of the United States.

CDC may also refer to:

== Organizations ==
=== Business ===
- Caisse des dépôts et consignations ("Deposits and Consignments Fund"), a financial institution owned by the French government
- Cameroon Development Corporation, an agribusiness company located in Limbe, Cameroon
- CDC Group, formerly the Commonwealth Development Corporation and Colonial Development Corporation, a British development organisation owned by the UK Government
- Central Depository Company, a Pakistani central securities depository company
- ComfortDelGro Australia, a major Australian operator of buses formerly named ComfortDelGro Cabcharge
- Consolidated Diesel Company, now Rocky Mount Engine Plant, a former engine plant owned in a joint venture by Cummins and J. I. Case
- Control Data Corporation, former supercomputer company
- Construction Data Company, also known as CDC News and CDC Publishing, a commercial construction reporting service
- Loong Air, by ICAO code

=== Government ===
- Africa Centres for Disease Control
- Australian Centre for Disease Control
- Canadian Dairy Commission
- Chichester District Council, local authority in West Sussex, England
- Chinese Center for Disease Control and Prevention
- Civil Defence Corps, UK, 1949–1968
- Colonial Defence Committee, a body advising on the military defence of the British Empire, 1885–1908
- Community Development Council, Singapore
- Community of Democratic Choice, of Eastern European countries
- Korea Centers for Disease Control and Prevention, a South Korean agency
- Taiwan Centers for Disease Control

=== Non-profit ===
- Certified Development Company, a U.S. Small Business Administration program designed to provide financing for the purchase of fixed assets
- Community development corporation, any non-profit organization that promotes and supports a community
- Commission for Developing Countries, a Commission of the International Mathematical Union

=== Politics ===
- California Democratic Council, US
- Coalition for Democratic Change, a Liberian political alliance
- Congress for Democratic Change, a Liberian political party
- Democratic Convergence of Catalonia (Catalan: Convergència Democràtica de Catalunya), a political party in Catalonia, Spain 1974–2016

=== Sport ===
- Cricket Discipline Commission (of the England and Wales Cricket Board)

=== Other organizations ===
- Cult of the Dead Cow (cDc), a computer hacker and DIY media organization

== Places ==
- Cedar City Regional Airport, by IATA code
- Center Day Camp, North Windham, Maine, U.S.
- Communicable Disease Centre, former hospital in Novena, Singapore

== Science ==
- Cell-division cycle in biology
  - cdc20
  - cdc25
  - Cdc42, cell-division cycle protein
- Cholesterol-dependent cytolysin, exotoxins secreted by bacteria
- Complement-dependent cytotoxicity
- Conventional dendritic cell, cDC
- Cross dehydrogenative coupling

== Technology ==
- Change data capture, to track changed data
- Carbide-derived carbon
- Clock domain crossing of a signal
- Communications daughter card for notebook computers
- Connected Device Configuration, of required Java ME features
- USB communications device class

== Other uses ==
- CDC?, a children's book by William Steig
- Chef de cuisine
- Café de Coral, restaurant chain
- Combat Direction Center of an aircraft carrier
- Continuous Discharge Certificate, seafarer's identity document
- Cul de canard, duck feathers used in fly fishing

== See also ==
- Africa CDC (Centres for Disease Control and Prevention)
- C.DC., the Swiss botany author abbreviation of Anne Casimir de Candolle
