= Florida State Road 230 =

State highway in Florida, United States

State Road 230
- SR 230 highlighted in red

Route information
- Maintained by FDOT
- Length: 7.379 mi (11.875 km)

Major junctions
- West end: US 301 in Starke
- East end: SR 16 at Kingsley Village

Location
- Country: United States
- State: Florida

Highway system
- Florida State Highway System; Interstate; US; State; Former; Pre‑1945; Toll; Scenic
← SR 228A	→ US 231

State Road 230 (SR 230) is a short state highway in northeastern Florida that runs between Starke, Florida and Camp Blanding. It runs east and west and is always no more than two lanes wide. Within the Starke city limits, and slightly beyond, the road is known as Call Street.

== Route description ==
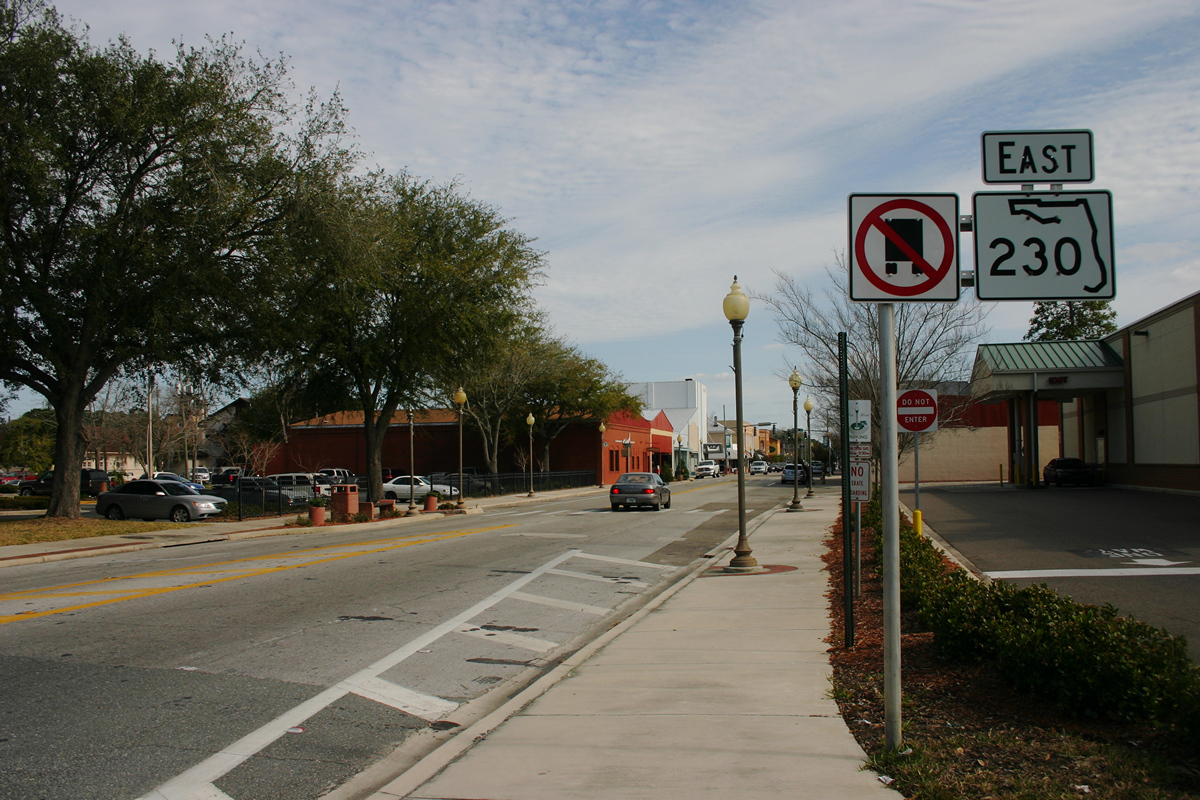
First SR 230 sign on Call Street east of US 301 with a "No Trucks" symbol sign.

State Road 230 begins in front of the Old Bradford County Courthouse which is at the northeast corner of US 301, one block north of SR 100. West of this intersection, West Call Street is a city street, and both sides of the intersection are restricted to right turns on US 301. This part of the road also runs through the Call Street Historic District, and a pair of CSX Transportation railroad lines that once carried Amtrak's Palmetto runs between Thompson and Cherry Streets.

Outside of the city limits, SR 230 runs along bridges over some creeks which feature parallel bridges for a never built new eastbound lane.

As the road crosses the Clay County Line, it is simply named SR 230, where it passes by the Starke Golf and Country Club. The road enters Camp Blanding territory on the same straight path, until curving to the north, while Kingsley Road continues to the east. SR 230 contains two endings at SR 16. The first is an extension for westbound traffic. The second is along Kingsley Lake, where SR 16 runs north momentarily until curving back to the east.

== Major intersections ==
County	Location	mi	km	Destinations	Notes
Bradford	Starke	0.000	0.000	US 301 north (Temple Avenue / SR 200) – Lawtey	no left turn westbound onto US 301 south (towards Gainesville)
Bradford	Starke			SR 230 Truck west (St. Clair Street) to SR 100	Moved from Water Street due to SR 100 railroad bridge project.
Bradford		1.870	3.009	CR 230A south	
Clay	Camp Blanding WMA	5.469	8.802	West Gate Road - Camp Blanding west gate	
Clay	Kingsley Village	7.379	11.875	SR 16	
1.000 mi = 1.609 km; 1.000 km = 0.621 mi

== Related routes ==
=== County Road 230A ===
County Road 230A
- Location: East of Starke

County Road 230A is a spur of State Road 230 southeast of Starke. It runs north from CR 100A to SR 230.

=== Starke truck route ===
State Road 230 Truck
- Location: Starke

Florida State Truck Route 230 in Starke, Florida was designated in order to divert trucks from the historic Call Street Historic District. The truck route originally ran for one block on South Water Street between SR 230 and SR 100 along the eastern edge of the Starke Downtown Music Pavilion. Due to the FDOT project to add a bridge for SR 100 over the CSX Wildwood Subdivision, Truck Route 230 was relocated to the newly constructed South Saint Claire Street.
