= Jontez Williams =

American football player

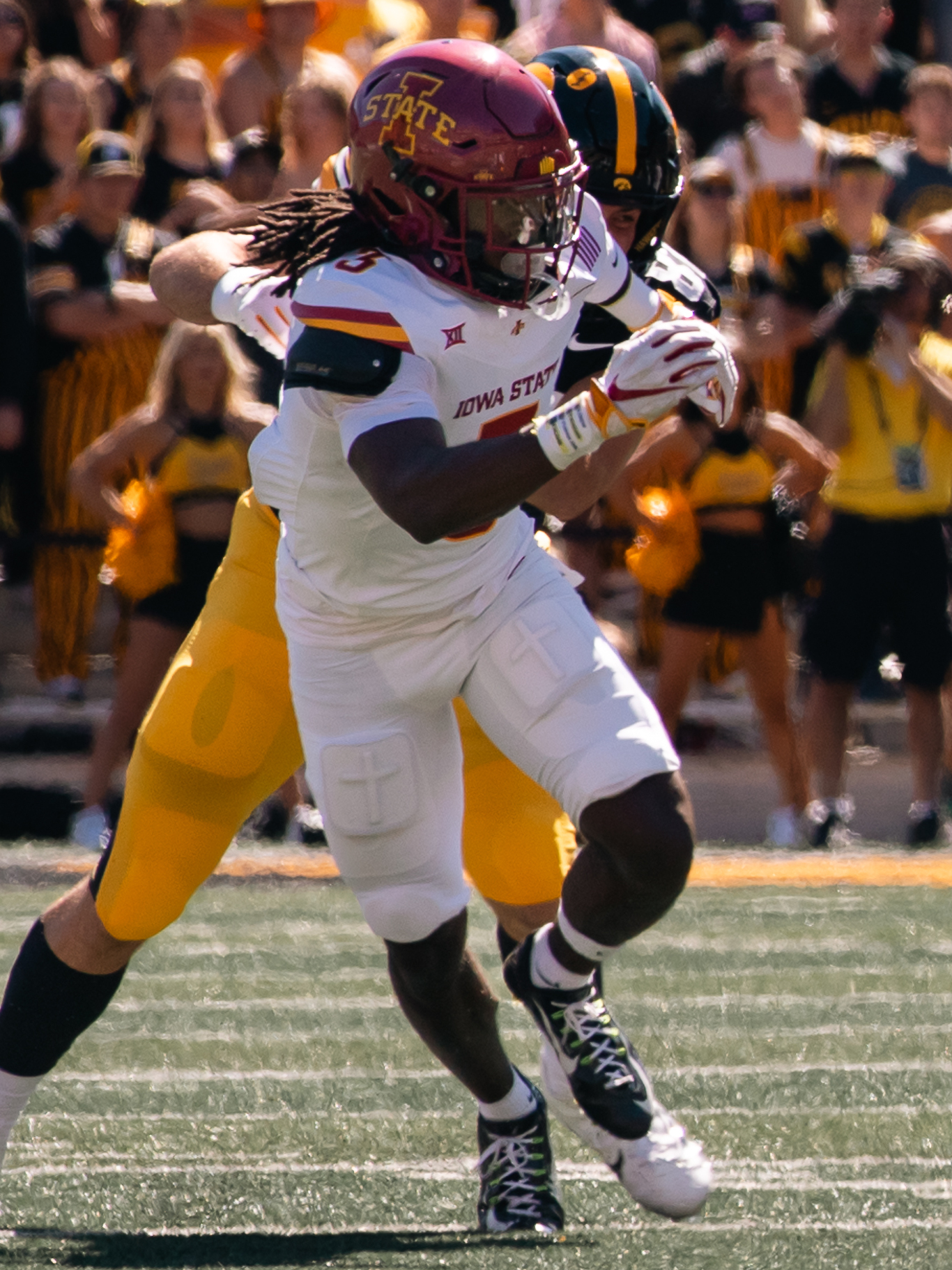
- Williams with Iowa State in 2024

No. 0 – USC Trojans
- Position: Cornerback
- Class: Redshirt Senior

Personal information
- Listed height: 5 ft 10 in (1.78 m)
- Listed weight: 195 lb (88 kg)

Career information
- High school: Bradford (Starke, Florida)
- College: Iowa State (2022–2025); USC (2026–present)

Awards and highlights
- Second-team All-Big 12 (2024)
- Stats at ESPN

Jontez Williams is an American college football cornerback for the USC Trojans. He previously played for the Iowa State Cyclones.

== Early life ==
Williams attended Bradford High School in Starke, Florida. In 2022, his senior year, he won the FHSAA 1A Basketball Championship. He was rated as a three-star recruit and committed to play college football for the Iowa State Cyclones, over the Tennessee Tech Golden Eagles.

== College career ==
As a freshman in 2022, Williams was redshirted. In 2023, he appeared in all 13 games with two starts for the Cyclones, notching six tackles and three pass deflections. In week 5 of the 2024 season, Williams recorded his first career interception in a win over Houston. In week 8, he notched an interception for his fourth straight game in a win over UCF.
