= 1998 Florida Commissioner of Agriculture election =

- November 3, 1998
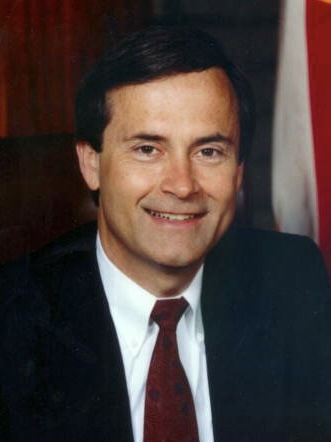

Nominee	Robert B. Crawford	Rich Faircloth
Party	Democratic	Republican
Popular vote	2,350,269	1,453,357
Percentage	61.79%	38.21%
- Crawford: 50–60% 60–70% 70–80% 80–90% >90% Faircloth: 50–60% 60–70% 70–80% >90% Tie: 40–50% 50% No votes
Agriculture
Commissioner before election
Robert B. Crawford
Democratic
Elected Agriculture
Commissioner
Robert B. Crawford
Democratic

An election took place on November 3, 1998, to elect the Florida Commissioner of Agriculture. The incumbent, Robert B. Crawford, easily defeated Republican Rich Faircloth to win re-election; he served under three governors, Lawton Chiles, Buddy MacKay, and Jeb Bush.

== Candidates ==
=== Democratic ===
- Robert B. Crawford

=== Republican ===
- Rich Faircloth

== General Election ==
Agriculture Commissioner of Florida General election, 1998
Party	Candidate	Votes	%
Democratic	Robert B. Crawford	2,350,269	61.79%
Republican	Rich Faircloth	1,453,357	38.21%
Total votes		4,888,377	100.0
