= Captain Citrus =

- Captain Citrus on the cover of Avengers Assemble featuring Captain Citrus #3, art by Kev Sharpe.

Publication information
- First comic appearance: Avengers Assemble featuring Captain Citrus #1

In-story information
- Alter ego: John Polk
- Species: Human
- Place of origin: Earth
- Team affiliations: The Avengers: Captain America; Iron Man; Thor; Black Widow; S.H.I.E.L.D. Nick Fury
- Abilities: Energy blasts Hard-light weaponry

Captain Citrus is a fictional mascot devised by the Florida Department of Citrus, a state body tasked with promoting Florida's agriculture. The character was designed to raise awareness of the benefits of Vitamin C to children.

== Publication history ==
Florida Citrus's mascot had previously been Ollie the Orange, who debuted in 2011 as an anthropomorphic orange in a superhero costume. However, there were worries that the creation's rotund nature unintentionally promoted obesity. In 2014, the character was redesigned in partnership with Marvel Comics' Custom Solutions to resemble a superhero; the division had previously worked with various private companies to make comics promoting brands and individuals, including M&M's, Lexus and Kiehl's. Part of the motivation for the initiative was to counter the impact citrus greening disease was having on Florida's citrus fruit industry and falling sales.

As a result Marvel produced promotional comics for the character, under creative director Bill Rosemann, which were released on Florida Orange's website. The contract was reported to be worth around $1m to Marvel, which represented a saving of $13m compared to Florida Citrus' previous use of television advertising. A three-issue promotional comic series featuring the Avengers was released in 2014, written by Ralph Macchio with art by Kev Sharpe, and edited by Rosemann and Mark Basso. The comics also included healthy eating guides and activity pages. An animated trailer for the initiative was also created, with the character voiced by actor Christian Spinosa. The first issue was released physically and given away at various events; the second and third issues were released digitally via the initiative's website.

Evaluations have suggested the campaign was successful.

== Fictional character biography ==
Polk's family own an orange grove in Florida with his sister Deb and his parents when solar pods land on the farm, gifting him super-powers. Soon after Blizzard arrives, having been hired to drive the Polks off their land. John drives the villain off, and takes the name Captain Citrus at the suggestion of his sister.

Weeks later, when humanoid robots attack Orlando, the Avengers members Captain America, Iron Man, Thor, and Black Widow arrive to battle them, but are outnumbered. Captain Citrus arrives to help, and transferring his solar powers through Mjolnir, scatters the robots, and they follow the machines back to their nearby base. The group is captured by their master, The Leader, but breaks free and captures the villain.

As news of his exploits spread, Captain Citrus is asked to speak about the benefits of orange juice to children's health at the United Nations, but is interrupted by Kang the Conqueror. With help from the Avengers, Captain Citrus is able to defeat Kang and is thanked by the delegates.

=== Powers and abilities ===
Captain Citrus gets his powers from solar pods that harness the power of the sun, and is able to use the solar energy to fire energy blasts and create "hard light" weapons.
