= Whitakers, North Carolina =

- Town
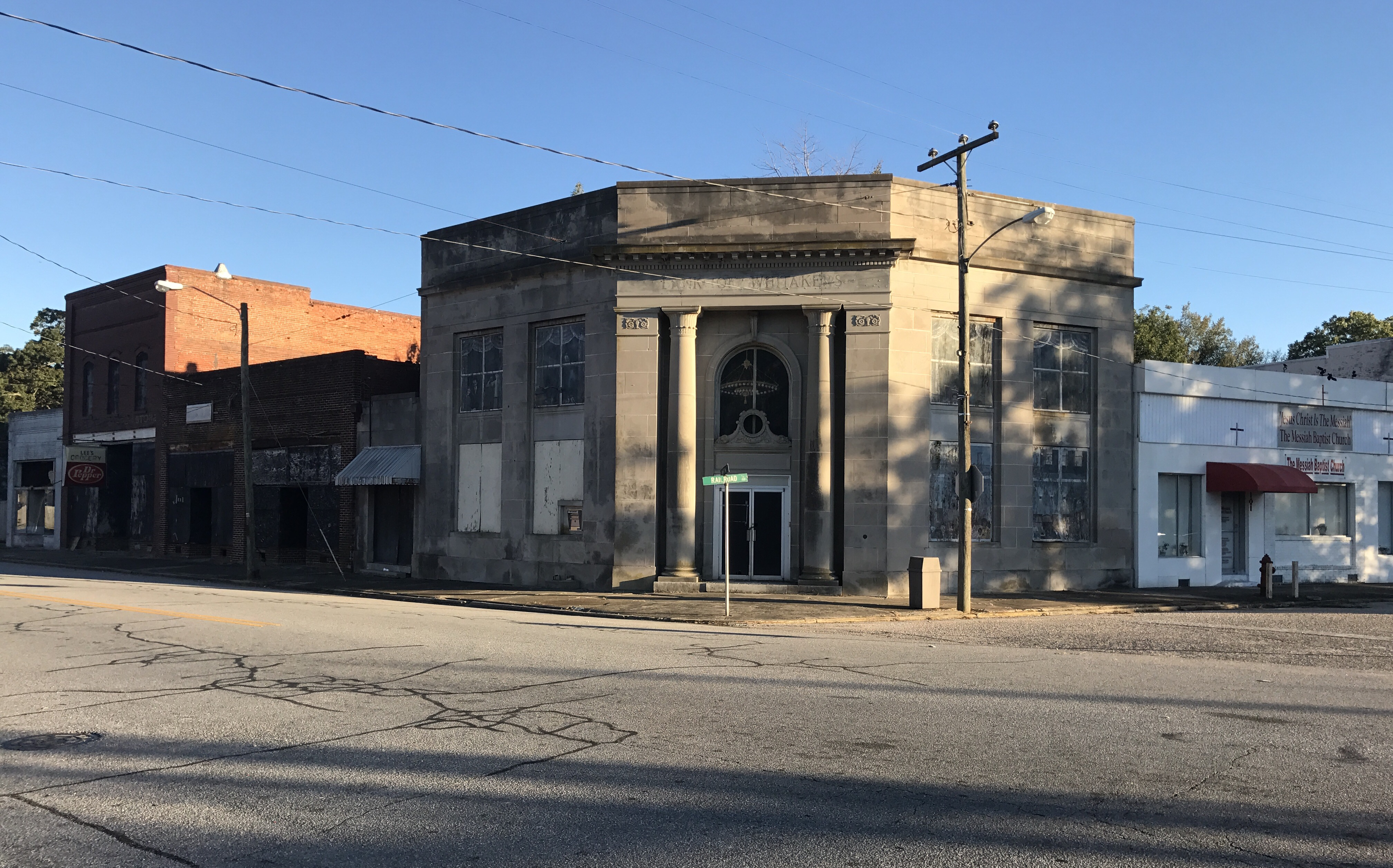
- Buildings in the center of Whitakers

- Location in Edgecombe County and the state of North Carolina.
- Coordinates: 36°06′21″N 77°42′47″W
- Country: United States
- State: North Carolina
- Counties: Edgecombe, Nash
- Founded: 1740
- Incorporated: 1872

Government
  - Mayor: Sammy Hopkins

Area
  - Total: 0.83 sq mi (2.15 km^{2})
  - Land: 0.83 sq mi (2.15 km^{2})
  - Water: 0 sq mi (0.00 km^{2})
- Elevation: 128 ft (39 m)

Population (2020)
  - Total: 627
  - Density: 754.5/sq mi (291.31/km^{2})
- Time zone: UTC-5 (Eastern (EST))
  - Summer (DST): UTC-4 (EDT)
- ZIP code: 27891
- Area code: 252
- FIPS code: 37-73160
- GNIS feature ID: 2406874
- Website: http://townofwhitakers.org

Whitakers /ˈhwɪtəkərz/ is a town in Edgecombe and Nash Counties in the U.S. state of North Carolina. It is divided between the two counties by railroad tracks and is the northernmost town in the two counties. It is part of the Rocky Mount, North Carolina Metropolitan Statistical Area. As of the 2020 census, Whitakers had a population of 627. The town is the home of Cummins' Rocky Mount Engine Plant, formerly known as Consolidated Diesel Company.

== History ==
The Porter Houses and Armstrong Kitchen was listed on the National Register of Historic Places in 2002.

== Geography ==
According to the United States Census Bureau, the town has a total area of .81 square miles (2.1 km^{2}), all land.

== Demographics ==
Historical population
Census	Pop.	Note	%±
1900	388		—
1910	755		94.6%
1920	723		−4.2%
1930	930		28.6%
1940	883		−5.1%
1950	962		8.9%
1960	1,004		4.4%
1970	926		−7.8%
1980	924		−0.2%
1990	860		−6.9%
2000	799		−7.1%
2010	744		−6.9%
2020	627		−15.7%
U.S. Decennial Census

=== Racial and ethnic composition ===
Whitakers town, North Carolina – Racial and ethnic composition Note: the US Census treats Hispanic/Latino as an ethnic category. This table excludes Latinos from the racial categories and assigns them to a separate category. Hispanics/Latinos may be of any race.
Race / Ethnicity (NH = Non-Hispanic)	Pop 2000	Pop 2010	Pop 2020	% 2000	% 2010	% 2020
White alone (NH)	324	189	161	40.55%	25.40%	25.68%
Black or African American alone (NH)	466	516	433	58.32%	69.35%	69.06%
Native American or Alaska Native alone (NH)	1	2	1	0.13%	0.27%	0.16%
Asian alone (NH)	0	4	1	0.00%	0.54%	0.16%
Native Hawaiian or Pacific Islander alone (NH)	0	0	0	0.00%	0.00%	0.00%
Other race alone (NH)	0	1	0	0.00%	0.13%	0.00%
Mixed race or Multiracial (NH)	1	17	19	0.13%	2.28%	3.03%
Hispanic or Latino (any race)	7	15	12	0.88%	2.02%	1.91%
Total	799	744	627	100.00%	100.00%	100.00%

=== 2020 census ===
As of the 2020 United States census, there were 627 people, 304 households, and 173 families residing in the town.

=== 2000 census ===
As of the census of 2000, there were 799 people, 331 households, and 219 families residing in the town. The population density was 977.9 inhabitants per square mile (377.6/km^{2}). There were 370 housing units at an average density of 452.9 per square mile (174.9/km^{2}). The racial makeup of the town was 40.55% White, 58.32% African American, 0.13% Native American, 0.88% from other races, and 0.13% from two or more races. Hispanic or Latino of any race were 0.88% of the population.

There were 331 households, out of which 24.5% had children under the age of 18 living with them, 38.4% were married couples living together, 20.5% had a female householder with no husband present, and 33.8% were non-families. 31.4% of all households were made up of individuals, and 13.9% had someone living alone who was 65 years of age or older. The average household size was 2.41 and the average family size was 3.04.

In the town, the population was spread out, with 22.0% under the age of 18, 7.5% from 18 to 24, 27.5% from 25 to 44, 25.5% from 45 to 64, and 17.4% who were 65 years of age or older. The median age was 41 years. For every 100 females, there were 88.0 males. For every 100 females age 18 and over, there were 84.3 males.

The median income for a household in the town was $24,141, and the median income for a family was $27,188. Males had a median income of $29,643 versus $21,736 for females. The per capita income for the town was $12,893. About 25.4% of families and 33.3% of the population were below the poverty line, including 50.2% of those under age 18 and 34.1% of those age 65 or over.

== Notable people ==
- Dwight Watson, aka "Tractor man," brought much of Washington, D.C. to a standstill for two days when he drove a tractor into the pond in the Constitution Gardens area of the National Mall and claimed to have explosives.
- Nathan Mayo, Florida Commissioner of Agriculture
