= Malisa Sarntinoranont =

American biomechanical engineer

Malisa Sarntinoranont is an American biomechanical engineer whose research focuses on medical implants, drug delivery, and the computational analysis of soft tissue needed to guide drug delivery. She is a professor in the Department of Mechanical & Aerospace Engineering at the University of Florida, and associate department chair for academic affairs.

== Education and career ==
Sarntinoranont is originally from Florida, and grew up in Starke, Clermont, and Gainesville, Florida. After studying mechanical engineering as an undergraduate at Georgia Tech, she went to the University of California, Berkeley for graduate study, focusing there on the biomechanics of cancer tumor tissue. She has a master's degree and Ph.D. from Berkeley, completed in 1999.

After post-doctoral research, she joined the University of Florida in 2003.

== Recognition ==
Sarntinoranont was named as an ASME Fellow in 2017.
