= Doyle Conner =

American politician

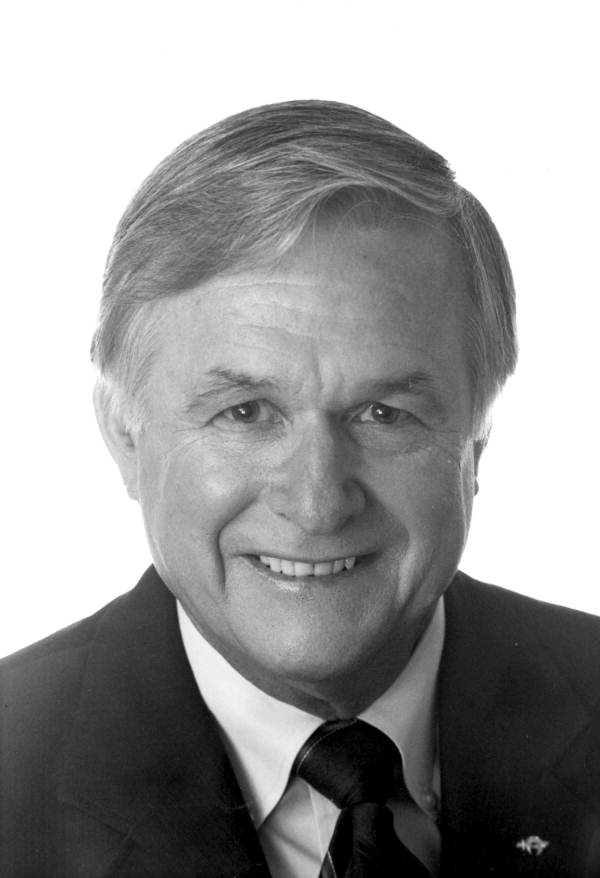
- Conner in 1982

7th Agriculture Commissioner of Florida
- In office January 3, 1961 – January 1991
- Governor: See list: C. Farris Bryant (1961–1965) W. Haydon Burns (1965–1967) Claude R. Kirk, Jr. (1967–1971) Reubin Askew (1971–1979) Bob Graham (1979–1987) Wayne Mixson (1987) Bob Martinez (1987–1991)
- Preceded by: Lee Thompson
- Succeeded by: Bob Crawford

Speaker of the Florida House of Representatives
- In office January 3, 1957 – January 3, 1959
- Preceded by: Thomas E. David
- Succeeded by: Thomas D. Beasley

Member of the Florida House of Representatives from Bradford County
- In office January 2, 1951 – January 3, 1961
- Preceded by: Jake Perman Roberts
- Succeeded by: A. J. Thomas Jr.

Personal details
- Born: Doyle Edward Conner; December 17, 1928 Starke, Florida
- Died: December 16, 2012 (aged 83) Monticello, Florida
- Party: Democratic Party
- Profession: Farmer

Doyle Edward Conner Sr. (December 17, 1928 – December 16, 2012) was an American politician. He served as Florida Commissioner of Agriculture for 30 years, and also served as Speaker of the Florida House of Representatives. He was born in 1928 in Starke, Florida.

== Early life ==
Conner was a fourth generation Floridian. From an early age, he worked in the family business of raising cattle, growing strawberries, and cutting timber. As a young man, Conner was active in 4-H, serving as president of the local and Alachua County branches of the club. At the age of 14, while attending a Florida Cooperative Extension Service forestry camp at a 4-H facility, Conner met the Florida Commissioner of Agriculture Nathan Mayo, and proclaimed that he would, some day, become Agriculture Commissioner when Mayo retired. In later life, Conner would remark that Without 4-H I would not be the person I am today, or have accomplished the things that I have.

== Education ==
Conner attended the University of Florida from 1947 until 1952 graduating with a Bachelor of Science degree in agriculture. While in college he was also a member of Alpha Gamma Rho fraternity. In addition, he served as National FFA President and was inducted in the Florida FFA Hall of Fame in 2007.

== Political career ==
Conner served his entire political career as a Democrat. He was first elected to the Florida House of Representatives in 1950, while he was still a student at the University of Florida. The feat earned Conner the nickname of "Boy Wonder", a label that stuck with him throughout his legislative career. Conner represented Bradford County while serving in the lower house. In 1958, at the age of 28, he was elected as the youngest Speaker of the House. On January 2, 1961, Doyle Conner was inaugurated as Commissioner of Agriculture, succeeding Lee Thompson who assumed the post of interim Commissioner upon Nathan Mayo's death in office. Conner went on to serve as Florida's Agriculture for the next 30 years. During his tenure as Commissioner, Conner oversaw efforts to eliminate the giant African snail, hog cholera, the Mediterranean fruit fly, and the cattle screwworm. During the 1980s, Conner was embroiled in political controversy regarding the lethal citrus canker disease and Florida citrus nurseries. While serving in this post he served under 7 Governors of Florida. Conner retired in 1991, and was active in Florida 4-H for much of his remaining life. He was inducted into the Florida Agriculture Hall of Fame in 1985, the Florida Citrus Hall of Fame in 1991, and the Florida 4-H Hall of Fame in 2002.

== Death ==
Doyle Conner died at a nursing home in Monticello, Florida on December 16, 2012, one day before his 84th birthday.

Party political offices
Preceded by Nathan Mayo	Democratic nominee for Florida Commissioner of Agriculture; 1960, 1964, 1966, 1970, 1974, 1978, 1982, 1986	Succeeded by Bob Crawford
