= 1994 Florida Commissioner of Agriculture election =

- November 8, 1994
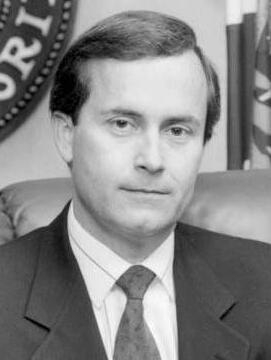

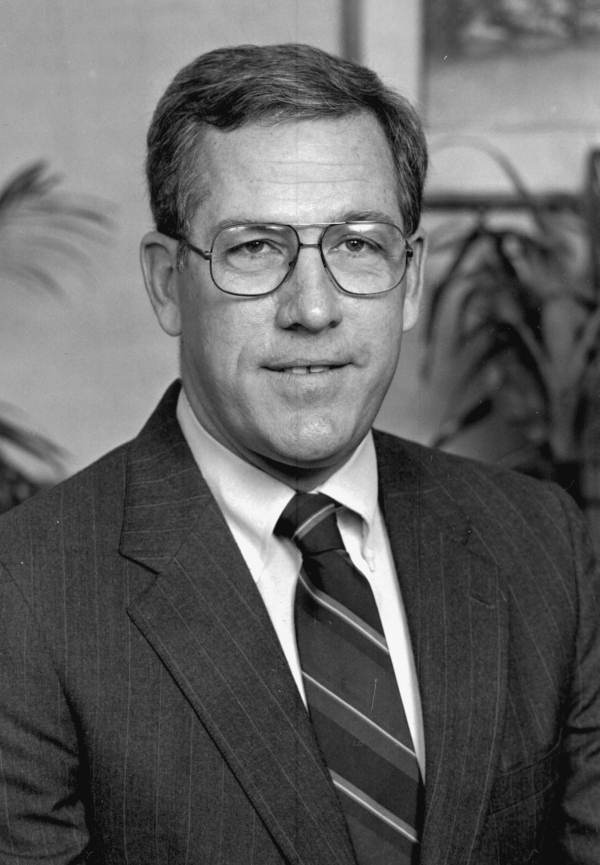
Nominee	Robert B. Crawford	James C. Smith
Party	Democratic	Republican
Popular vote	2,044,995	1,968,418
Percentage	50.95%	49.05%
- Crawford: 50–60% 60–70% 70–80% 80–90% >90% Smith: 50–60% 60–70% 70–80% 80–90% >90% Tie: 50% No votes
Agriculture Commissioner before election
Robert B. Crawford
Democratic
Elected Agriculture Commissioner
Robert B. Crawford
Democratic

The 1994 Florida Commissioner of Agriculture election took place on November 8, 1994 to elect the Florida Commissioner of Agriculture. Incumbent Democratic Commissioner Robert B. Crawford was re-elected to a second term in office.
