= FDOC =

FDOC may refer to:

- Florida Department of Citrus
- Florida Department of Corrections
