= Bradford County School District =

School district in Florida

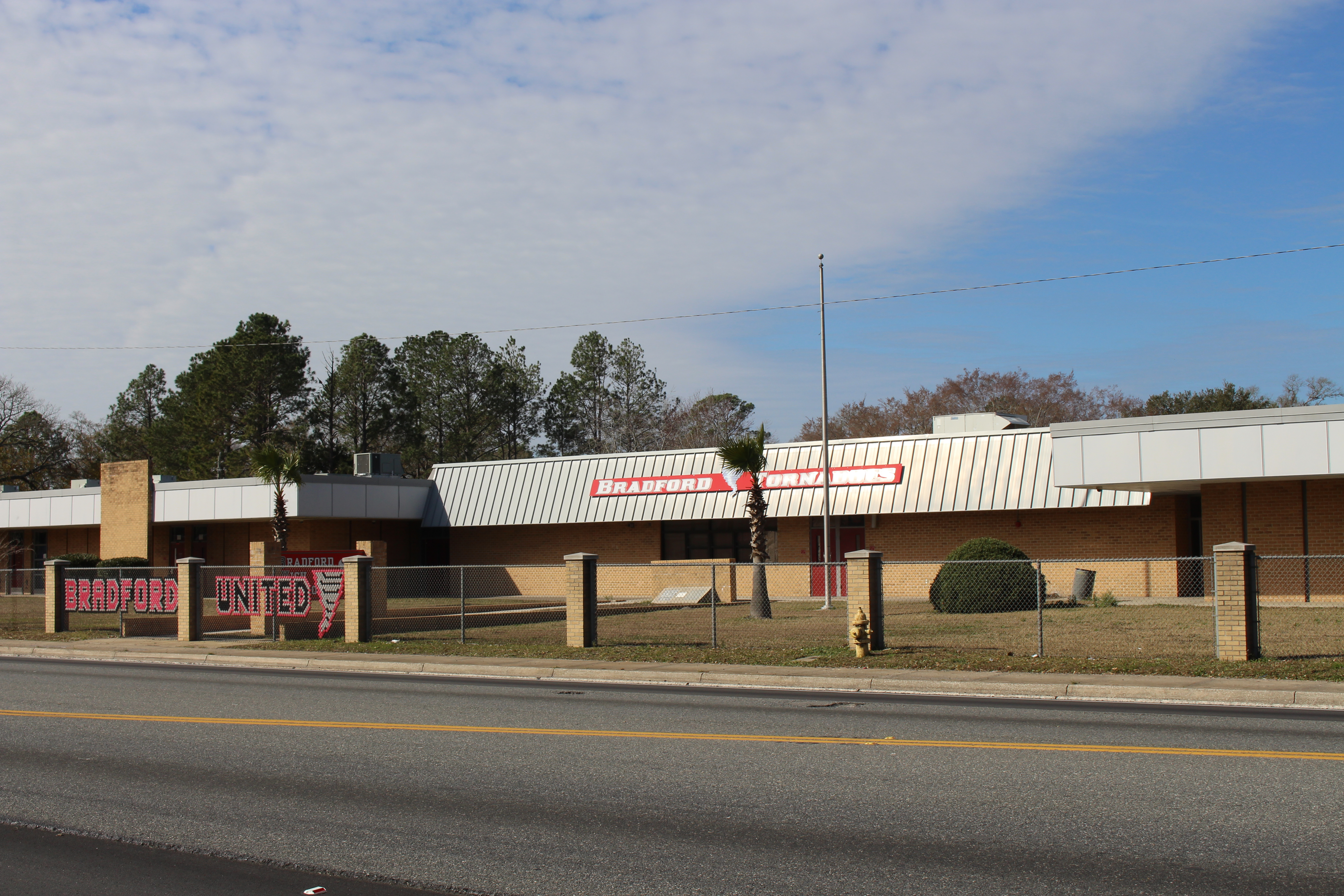
Bradford High School

The Bradford County School District manages public education in all of Bradford County, Florida. Its main office is in Starke. Schools in the district include:

- Bradford High School
- Bradford Middle School
- Starke Elementary School
- Southside Elementary School
- Brooker Elementary School
- Hampton Elementary School
- Lawtey Elementary School
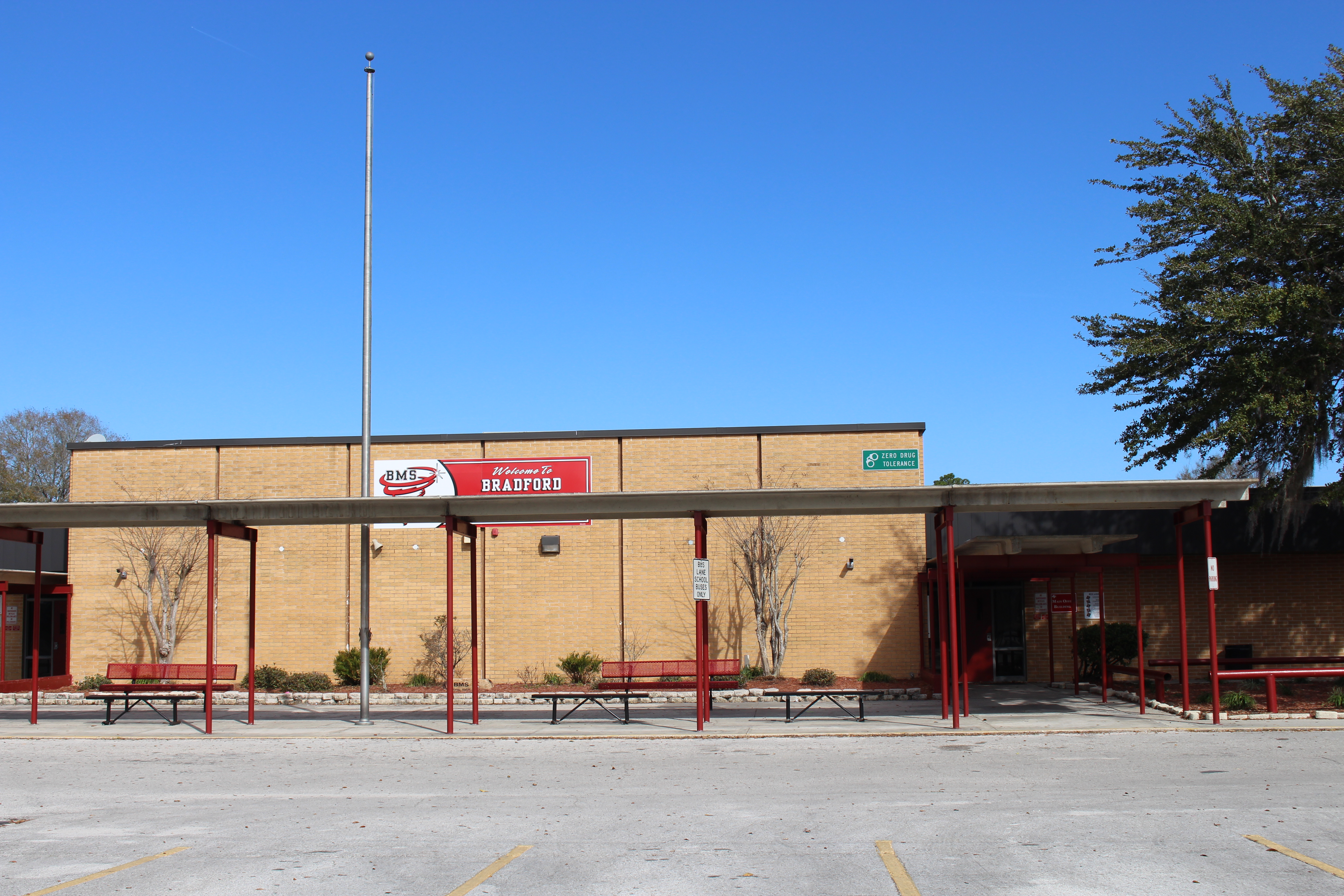
Bradford Middle School

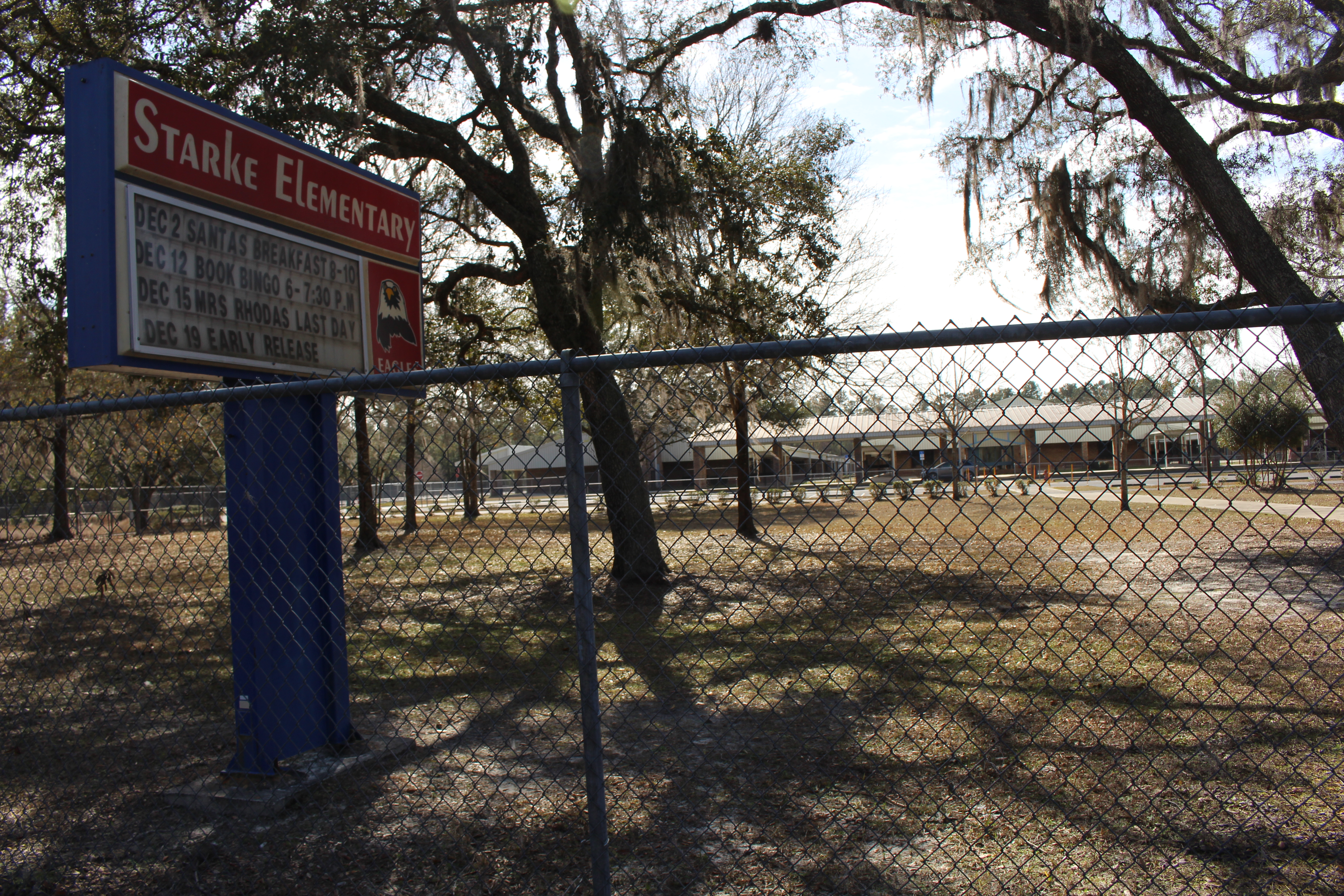
Starke Elementary School

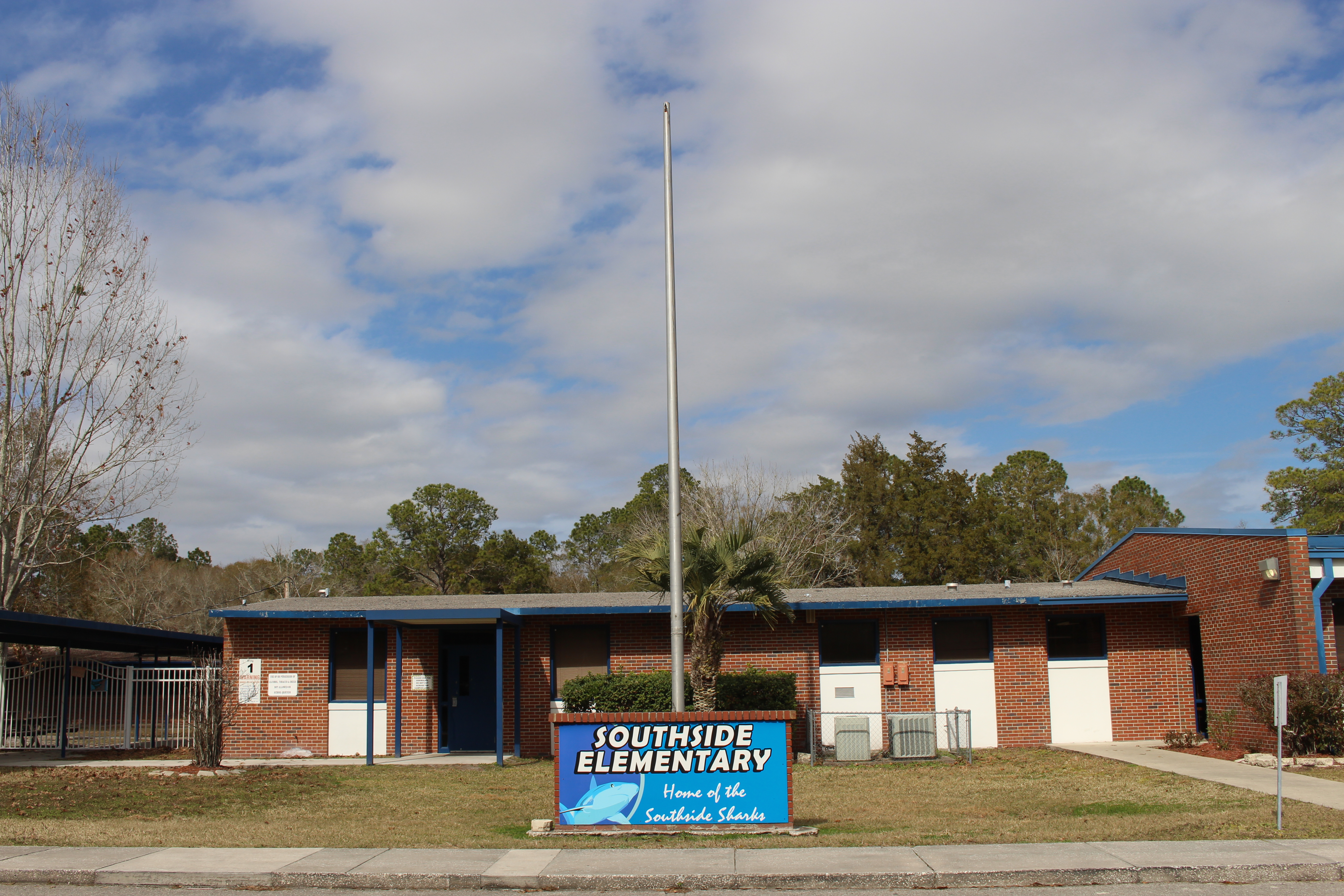
Southside Elementary School
