= Bradford High School (Florida) =

Public high school in Starke, Florida, United States

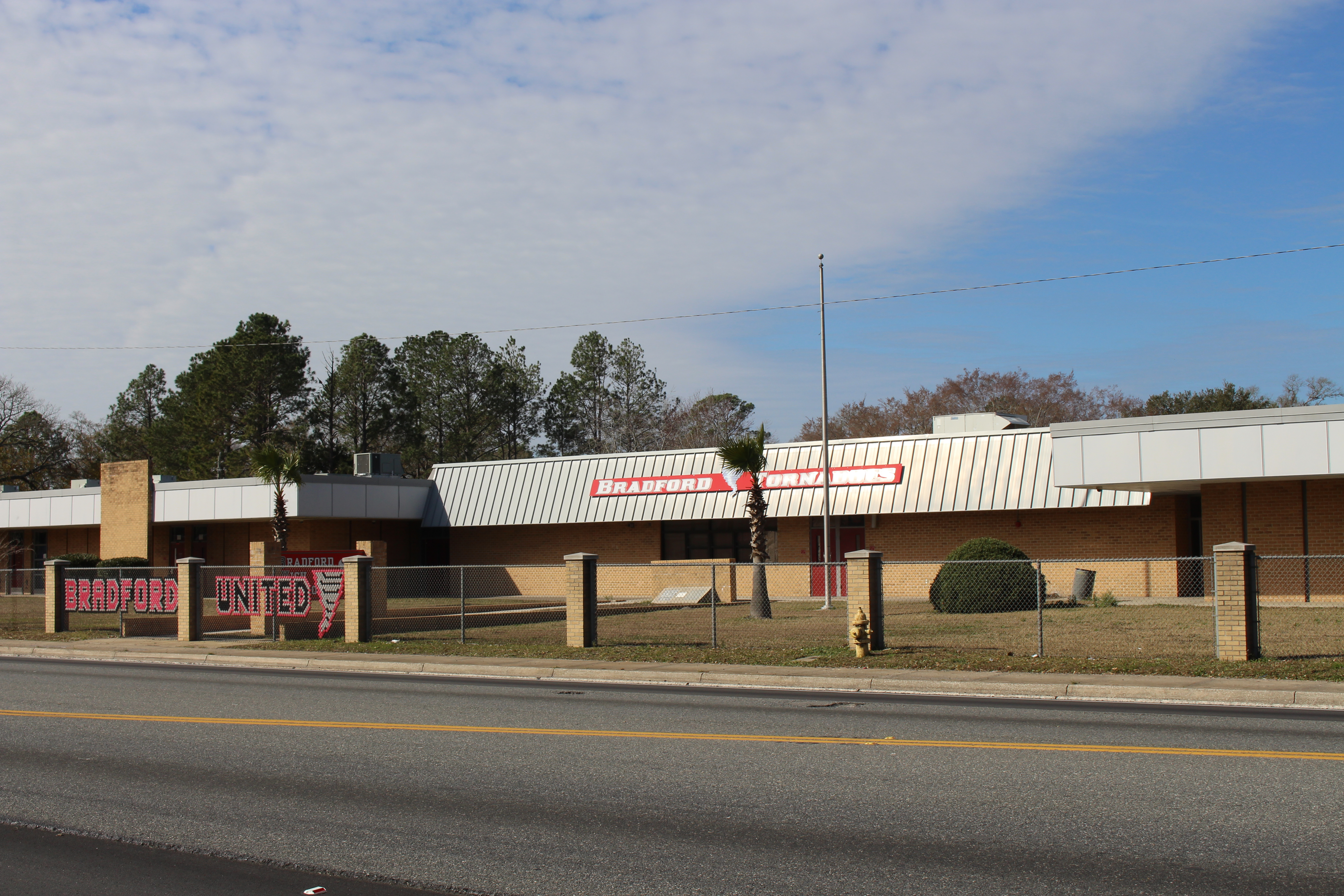

Location
- 581 N Temple Ave; Starke, Florida 32091-2609; United States; 29.644614°N 81.669736°W

Information
- Type: Public High School
- Established: 1942
- School district: Bradford County School District
- Principal: Christopher Coffey
- Teaching staff: 27.26 (FTE)
- Grades: 9–12
- Gender: Both
- Enrollment: 812 (2023–2024)
- Student to teacher ratio: 29.79
- Hours in school day: 8:25-3:15
- Colors: Gray and scarlet
- Athletics: FHSAA
- Mascot: Turbo the Tornado
- Nickname: Tornadoes
- Rival: Baker County and Baldwin
- Accreditation: Southern colleges of United States
- National ranking: A
- Website: bhs.bradfordschools.org

Bradford High School is in Starke, Florida, United States. It serves grades 9–12 students in the Bradford County School District. There are approximately 1,212 students currently enrolled in Bradford High School as of school year 2022–2024.

== Athletics ==
Bradford High School students participate in the following sports:

Boys sports:

- Baseball
- Boys' Basketball
- Boys' Golf
- Boys' Tennis
- Football
- Weightlifting
- Girl sports:
- Girls' Basketball
- Girls' Golf
- Girls' Tennis
- Girls' Weightlifting
- Softball
- Track & Field
- Volleyball
- Wrestling
- Cheer
- Flag football
- Inter-gender:
- E-Sports
- Drama
- Academic Team
- creative writing

== Notable alumni ==
- Dontae Balfour, college football defensive back for the Texas Tech Red Raiders
- Larry Brown, played college football at the University of Kansas. Played Tight End and Tackle for the Pittsburgh Steelers from 1971 to 1984.
- Stephanie Kopelousos, former Florida Department of Transportation secretary
- Jontez Williams, college football cornerback for the USC Trojans
