= Porter Houses and Armstrong Kitchen =

Historic buildings in North Carolina, United States

- U.S. National Register of Historic Places
- Location within North Carolina Location within the United States
- Location: 821 Wells Rd., near Whitakers, North Carolina
- Coordinates: 36°3′55″N 77°40′1″W
- Area: 1 acre (0.40 ha)
- Built: c. 1850, c. 1900
- Architectural style: Gambrel-roofed house
- NRHP reference No.: 02000988
- Added to NRHP: September 14, 2002

Porter Houses and Armstrong Kitchen is a set of two historic homes and a kitchen building located near Whitakers, Edgecombe County, North Carolina. The first Porter dwelling dates to the last quarter of the 18th century, and is a 1 1/2-story frame dwelling with a gambrel roof. It was restored in 1994. The second Porter dwelling also dates to the last quarter of the 18th century, and is a one-room, 1 1/2-story frame dwelling with a gable roof. It measures approximately 16 feet wide and 24 feet long. Also on the property is a frame kitchen building built about 1850 and remodeled about 1900.

It was listed on the National Register of Historic Places in 2002.
