= Bob Crawford (Florida politician) =

American politician

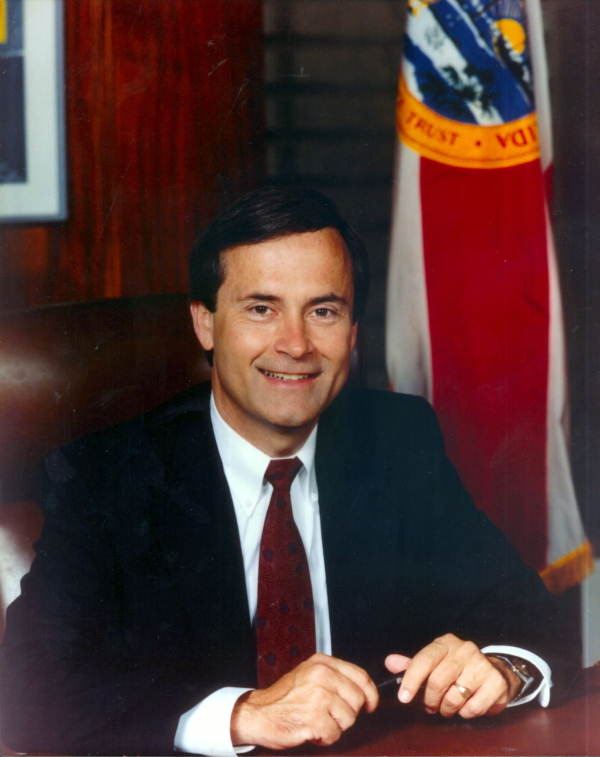

Agriculture Commissioner of Florida
- In office January 19, 1991 – January 30, 2001
- Governor: Lawton Chiles; Buddy MacKay; Jeb Bush
- Preceded by: Coleman Hicks
- Succeeded by: Terry L. Rhodes

President of the Florida Senate
- In office November 22, 1988 – November 20, 1990
- Preceded by: John Vogt
- Succeeded by: Gwen Margolis

Member of the Florida Senate from the 13th district
- In office November 16, 1982 – November 20, 1990
- Preceded by: Alan Trask
- Succeeded by: Rick Dantzler

Member of the Florida House of Representatives from the 49th district
- In office 1976–1982
- Preceded by: Ray Mattox
- Succeeded by: Ron Richmond

Personal details
- Born: Robert Bruce Crawford III; January 26, 1948 (age 78) Bartow, Florida, U.S.
- Party: Democratic
- Spouse: Nancy Caswall
- Children: 2
- Education: University of Miami
- Occupation: Financial planner; property manager

Robert Bruce Crawford III (born January 26, 1948) is an American former politician who served as Florida Commissioner of Agriculture and a legislator in the Florida State House and Senate. He graduated from Bartow High School. Crawford earned a Business and Finance degree from University of Miami. He worked as a financial planner and started a property management company with his wife, Nancy.

Crawford was senate president from 1988 until 1990. As Senate President he helped push for funding of the Polk Parkway, created the largest transportation funding act in the state's history and guided the approval of a land preservation program that has since protected thousands of acres of environmentally sensitive land.

A member of the Democratic Party, he represented Winter Haven and the surrounding areas in the House and Senate. He argued for a higher cigarette tax in 1986. Crawford was known for working across party lines to increase funding for economic development, education and research at Shands Hospital.

He was re-elected Florida Commissioner of Agriculture in 1994 and 1998. Despite being a Democrat, he was a close ally of Republican Governor Jeb Bush, endorsing him for the office in 1998 and backing his brother, George W. Bush, for president in 2000; he then served on a special commission during the controversial 2000 election recount in Florida which certified Bush's narrow, 537-vote victory in the state, which alienated him from many fellow Democrats. In 2000, he was named executive director of the Florida Citrus Commission, approved by a board which The Ledger noted was largely composed individuals appointed by Bush. In 2004, Crawford came under scrutiny by the state legislature for his leadership of the commission, citing concerns over the organization's handling of contracts, as well as his decision to charge business class flights to the Florida Department of Citrus without prior approval. Crawford resigned later that year, effective June 1, citing health concerns.

Party political offices
Preceded by Doyle Conner	Democratic nominee for Florida Commissioner of Agriculture; 1990, 1994, 1998	Succeeded by David Nelson
