= Lee Thompson (politician) =

American politician

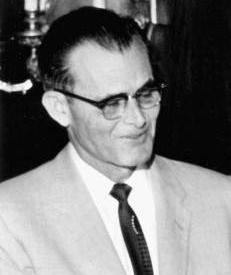

6th Agriculture Commissioner of Florida
- In office April 18, 1960 – January 3, 1961
- Governor: LeRoy Collins
- Preceded by: Nathan Mayo
- Succeeded by: Doyle Conner

Acting Lieutenant Governor of Florida
- In office January 7, 1961 – January 7, 1967
- Governor: C. Farris Bryant; W. Haydon Burns
- Preceded by: Nathan Thompson
- Succeeded by: Ray Osborne

Personal details
- Born: May 28, 1908
- Died: November 10, 1976 (aged 68)
- Children: 3

Lee Thompson (May 28, 1908 – November 10, 1975) was an American politician. He served as ad interim Florida Commissioner of Agriculture from April 18, 1960 to January 3, 1961. He also served as an assistant commissioner under Mayo and as acting Lieutenant Governor of Florida from 1961 to 1967.

In 1960, Thompson was awarded the Good Egg Award by Florida egg commission chairman W. E. Eckler.
