= Call Street Historic District =

Historic district in Florida, United States

- U.S. National Register of Historic Places
- U.S. Historic district
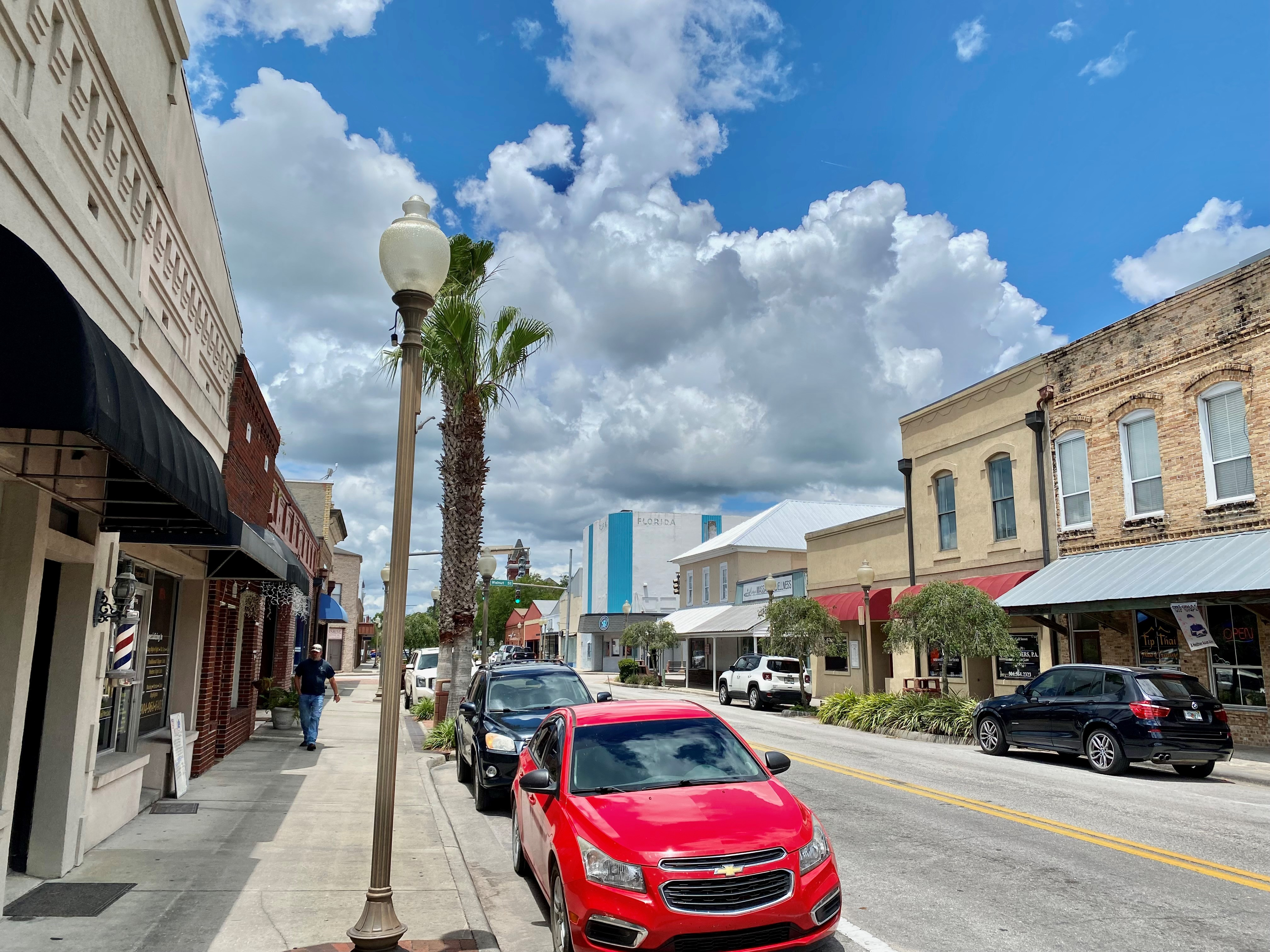
- Looking west along East Call Street between Thompson and Walnut Streets

- Location within Florida Location within the United States
- Location: Starke, Florida
- Coordinates: 29°56′37″N 82°6′30″W
- Area: 120 acres (0.49 km^{2})
- Built: 1858
- NRHP reference No.: 85003329
- Added to NRHP: 12 December 1985

The Call Street Historic District is a U.S. historic district (designated as such on December 12, 1985) located in Starke, Florida. It encompasses approximately 120 acres (0.49 km^{2}), and the boundaries are Jefferson, Cherry, Madison (FL 100), and Temple Streets (US 301). It contains 23 historic buildings and 1 structure.

The historic district also serves as the City of Starke's primary restaurant and entertainment district, with a theatre, antique shops, restaurants, a history museum, and cultural center. Located within the historic district is another location on the National Register of Historic Places, the Santa Fe College Andrews Center.

Call Street, which is part of Florida State Road 230, was named in honor of former Florida territorial governor, Richard K. Call. It is officially named "West Call Street" west of Walnut Street and "East Call Street" east of Walnut. Similarly, Walnut Street is officially named "South Walnut Street" south of Call Street and "North Walnut Street" north of Call Street.
