= Rocky Mount Engine Plant =

Engine manufacturing plant in Whitakers, North Carolina

- Built: 1979–1981
- Operated: 1981–present
- Location: 9377 US-301; Whitakers, North Carolina, United States
- Coordinates: 36°5′32″N 77°43′41″W
- Industry: Automotive
- Products: engines
- Employees: 1,800
- Volume: 1,200,000 square feet (110,000 m^{2})
- Owner: Cummins Inc.

Rocky Mount Engine Plant (RMEP), formerly known as Consolidated Diesel Company (CDC), is a engine manufacturing plant in Whitakers, North Carolina owned by Cummins Inc.

== History ==
The plant was established in 1979 (and was opened in 1981) as a joint venture between Cummins Engine Company and J. I. Case, and in 1983, it produced its first engines.

In July 1988, the plant began producing the 5.9L 6BT engine for 1989 model year Dodge Ram trucks as part of the Cummins/Chrysler partnership. Due to high demand, the plant shifted Chrysler-bound production to a new plant in Columbus, Indiana, in 1992. In June 1999, the plant was the subject of a prominent Fast Company feature titled "Powered by the People".

On July 18, 2008, Cummins acquired the CNH's remaining 50% equity stake in the joint venture, converting it into a wholly owned subsidiary and was renamed Rocky Mount Engine Plant (RMEP).

== Products ==
- Cummins ISB
