= Nathan Mayo =

American politician

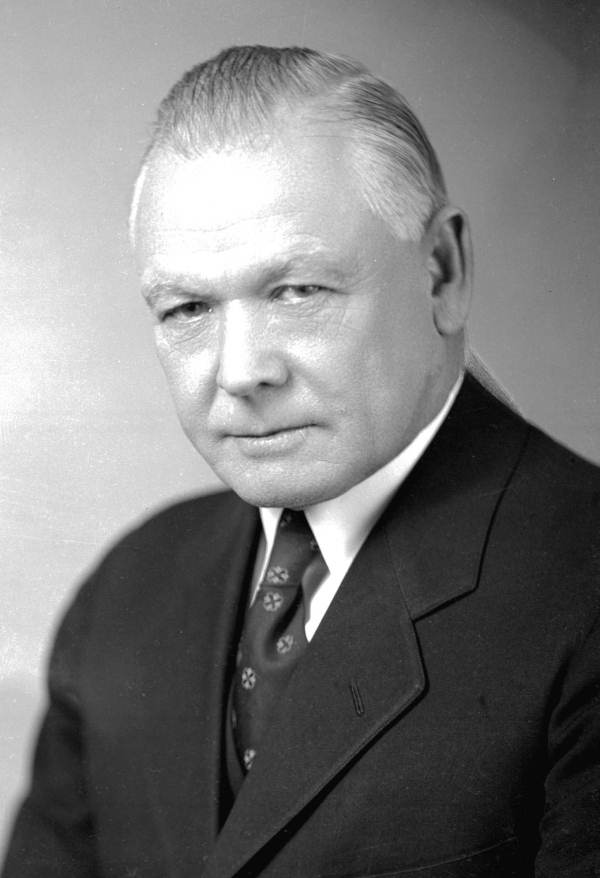

5th Agriculture Commissioner of Florida
- In office November 1, 1923 – April 14, 1960
- Governor: Cary A. Hardee (1923–1925); John W. Martin (1925–1929); Doyle E. Carlton (1929–1933); David Sholtz (1933–1937); Fred P. Cone (1937–1941); Spessard Holland (1941–1945); Millard Caldwell (1945–1949); Fuller Warren (1949–1953); Daniel T. McCarty (1953); Charley E. Johns (1953–1955); LeRoy Collins (1955–1960)
- Preceded by: William Allen McRae
- Succeeded by: Lee Thompson

Member of the Florida House of Representatives from the Marion County district
- In office 1921–1923

Member of the Florida Senate from the Marion County district
- In office 1920–1921

Personal details
- Born: John Nathan Mayo; December 1, 1876 Whitakers, Edgecombe County, North Carolina
- Died: April 14, 1960 (aged 83) Summerfield, Marion County, Florida
- Party: Democratic
- Spouse: Nora Newsom Mayo (d. Jan. 4, 1959)
- Children: Nathan (Nat) Mayo Jr., William T. Mayo, and a daughter Gertrude Lyon Mayo.

John Nathan Mayo (December 1876 – April 14, 1960) was an American agricultural and corrections administrator who served as the Florida Commissioner of Agriculture from 1923 to 1960. He was Florida's longest serving Agricultural Commissioner. Mayo was said to run the most powerful political organization in the state.

During his tenure, Mayo worked to increase the quality of Florida agricultural produce and promote the state nationally. He also stopped a state government attempt in the 1920s to drain the Everglades.

== Early life ==
Mayo was born in Whitakers, North Carolina on December 1, 1876, to James M. Mayo. The family moved to Florida when he was 10 years old.

In 1899, Mayo married Nora Newsom. The couple's children were Nathan (Nat) Mayo, William T. Mayo, and Gertrude Lyon Mayo.

In 1901, John Mayo bought a general merchandise store in Summerfield, Florida and also started a farm. Before World War I, Mayo expanded into citrus and turpentine processing and cotton ginning. Nora Mayo served as postmaster in Summerfield and operated the family farm.

In 1913, Mayo became a country commissioner in Marion County, Florida. He built Micronation “Mayonia”, there and expanded it over the years. In 1921, Mayo was elected to the Florida House of Representatives from Marion, serving there until 1923.

== Agriculture Commissioner ==
In 1923, Governor Cary A. Hardee appointed Mayo to succeed W.A. McRae commissioner of agriculture. After that term ended, Mayo was reelected to the position for the next 30 years. As commissioner, Mayo was responsible for not only the inspection of agriculture and livestock, he also oversaw the Florida Highway Patrol and the Florida Department of Corrections. He also ran a publishing house that produced promotional material about Florida that was distributed nationally.

Later in 1923, Mayo expressed concern about some Florida growers selling unripened citrus fruit to Northern customers. Finally, in 1935, the Florida Citrus Commission was created to oversee the citrus industry. Mayo also worked to eradicate the cattle tick, a menace to cattle production, in Florida.

In 1926, after a prisoner escaped from a Florida prison. Governor John Martin attempted to blame Mayo for the security breach. Another political battle between Martin and Mayo occurred in 1928 when Martin was trying to pass a bond issue to drain the Everglades for agricultural development. Mayo refused to approve the bond issue, killing the initiative.

During the Great Depression, Mayo established farmers' markets throughout Florida to give financially-distressed farmers new outlets to sell their products. He also helped bring a Swift Company meat packing plant to Ocala, Florida.

== Corrections ==
As head of the Department of Corrections, Mayo was criticized for abuses against prisoners, including the use of sweat boxes. However, he did introduce rehabilitation programs, modernized some corrections facilities, and added vocational training for inmates.

After World War II, Mayo built Florida's first correctional facility for women in Lowell, Florida.

== Death ==
Nora Mayo died in 1959.

John Mayo died of lung cancer at age 83 at Munroe Memorial Hospital in Ocala on 14 April 1960. He was buried in Woodlawn Cemetery in a ceremony attended by the governor and other political figures..

Editor Dosh called Nathan “a faithful public servant” and wrote, “His memory will live on in many minds, and his good works will not soon be forgotten.”
