= Cul de canard =

Duck feathers used in fishing

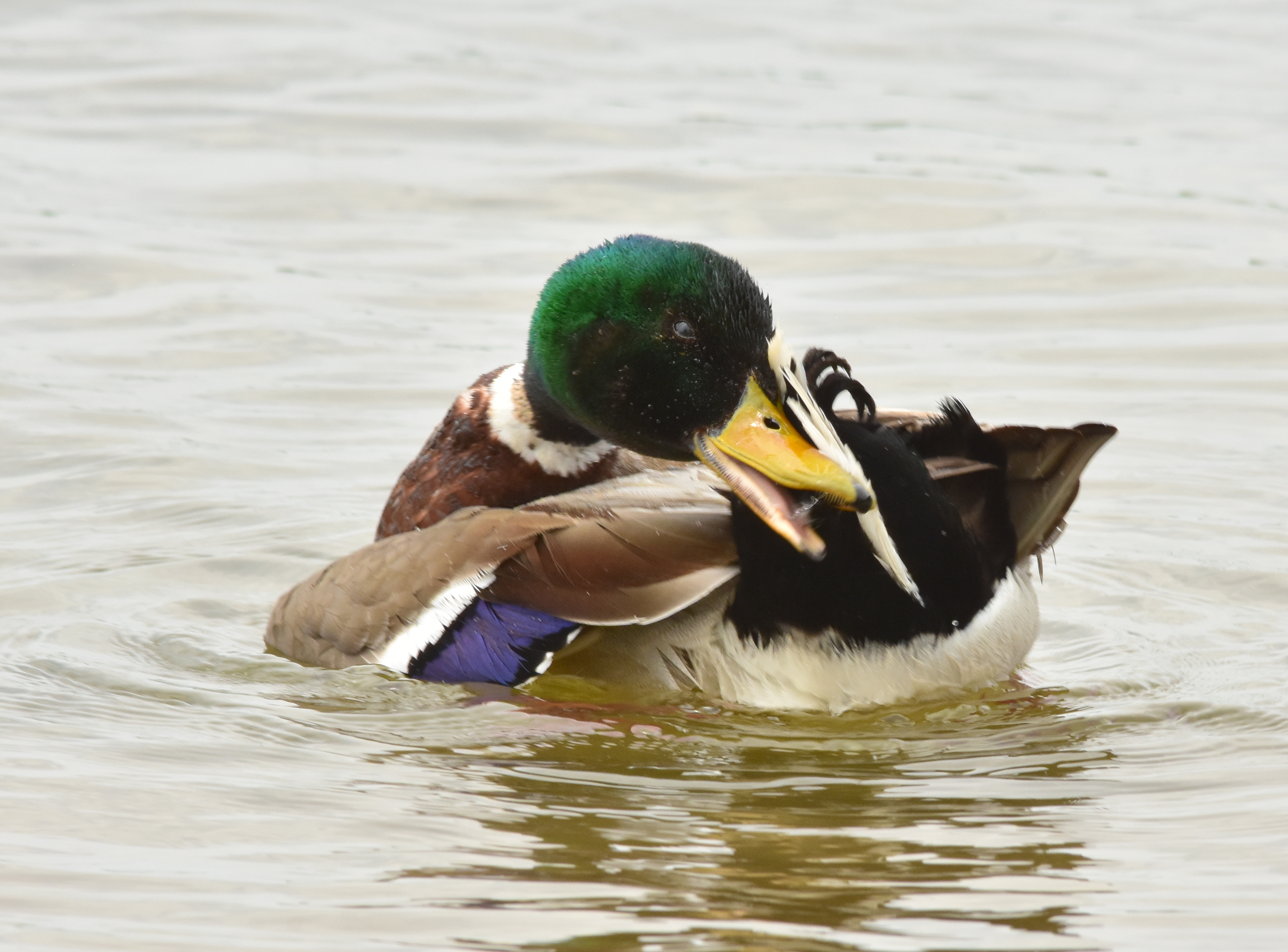
Mallard (Anas platyrhynchos) preening its feathers using oil from the uropygial gland

Cul de canard (CDC; French for "duck bottom") are the feathers from the back of a duck directly around the preen gland (uropygial gland); they are very buoyant due to preen oil produced by the preen gland. They are used when tying dry flies for fly fishing. They owe their buoyancy to their proximity to the ducks preen gland which secretes an oil distributed by the duck as a cleaning and waterproofing measure. It is unnecessary for the angler to add additional oil by way of floatant. Flies incorporating CDC are easy to dress requiring no floatant and popular with anglers and trout alike.

== History ==
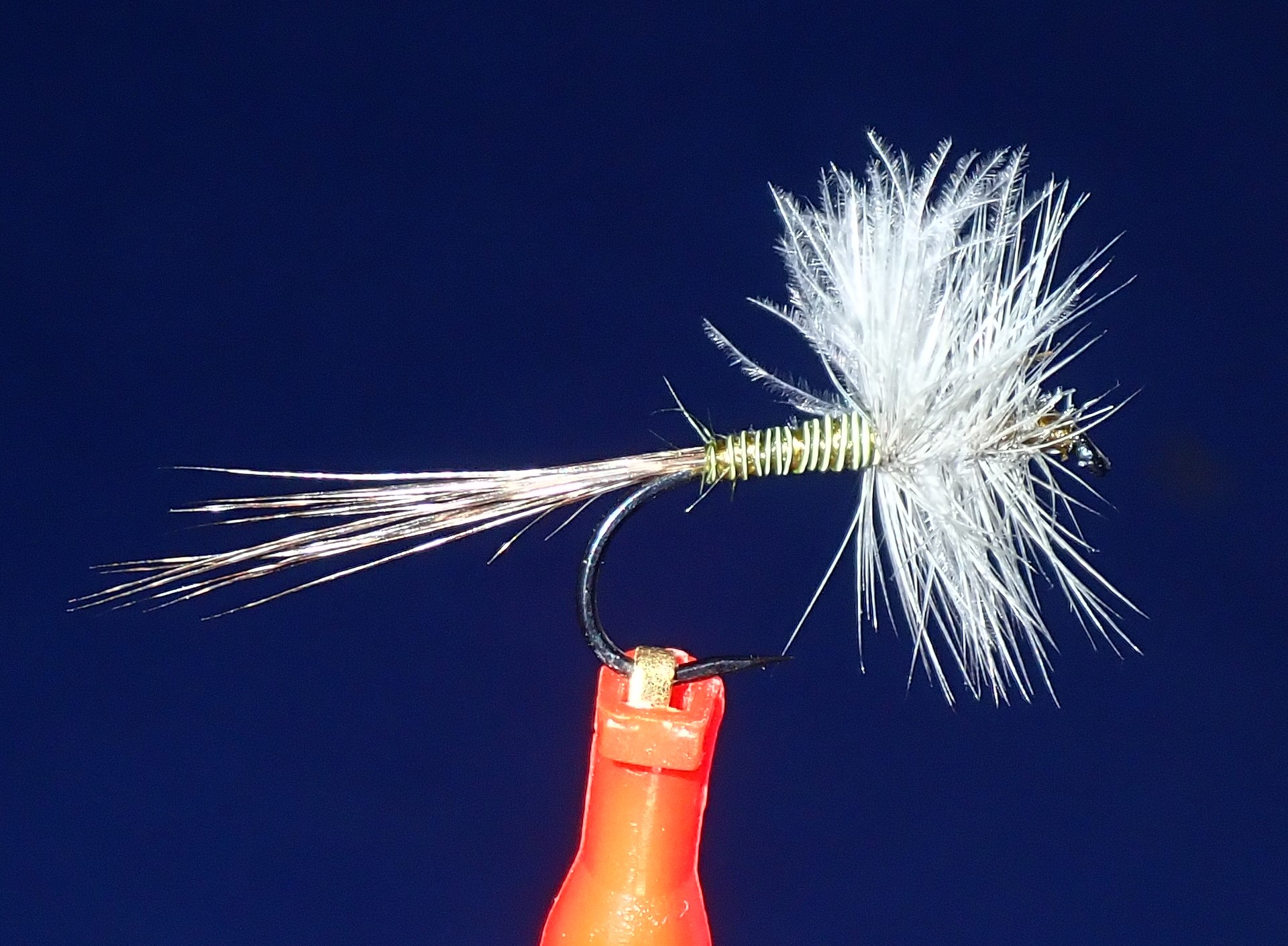
A fly lure utilising cul de canard feathers

The use of CDC's in fly fishing originated from the Jura Mountains during the 1920s where fly fishermen used this feather in dry flies to aid buoyancy in a particular pattern called Moustique. It took until the 1980s for popular use of this feather within a whole range of patterns.
