= Florida Department of Citrus =

Florida government agency

The Florida Department of Citrus (FDOC) is an executive state agency for agriculture in Florida in charge of regulating, researching and marketing the state's citrus industry and citrus research. Its headquarters are in the Bob Crawford Agricultural Center in Bartow. Its Economic Research department is located at 2125 McCarty Hall in the University of Florida in Gainesville, and its Scientific Research department is in Lake Alfred.

FDOC is funded by an assessment paid by Florida's citrus industry. The industry employed over 45,000 people and delivers an economic impact to the state of $8.6 billion.

The FDOC is governed by the Florida Citrus Commission, a board of 9 people appointed by the Governor of Florida.
