= Florida Commissioner of Agriculture =

Constitutional officer in the US state of Florida

Commissioner of Agriculture of Florida
- Seal of the Department of Agriculture and Consumer Services

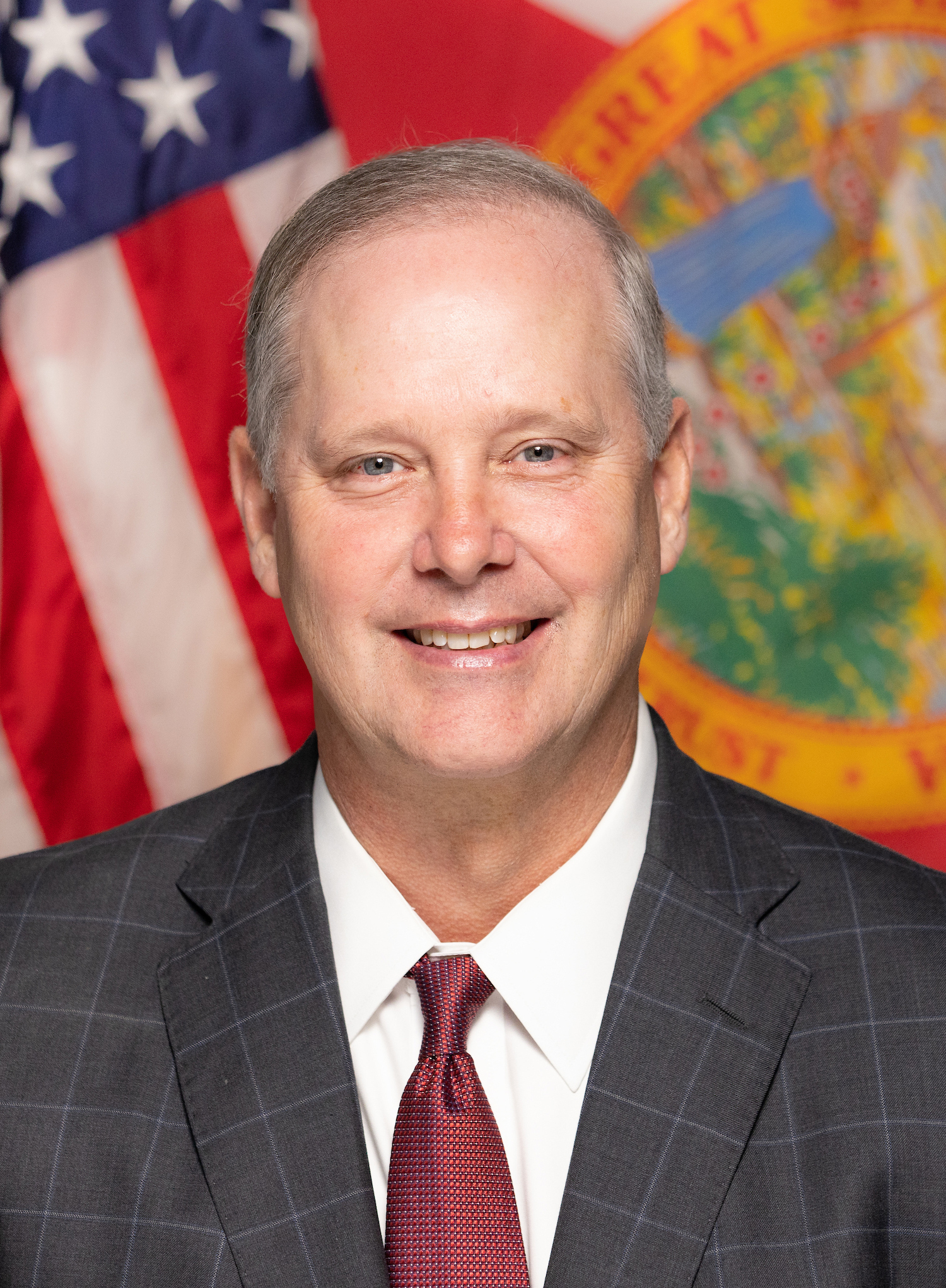
- Incumbent; Wilton Simpson since January 3, 2023
- Department of Agriculture and Consumer Services
- Term length: Four years, renewable once
- Inaugural holder: Lucius B. Wombwell
- Formation: 1885
- Succession: Fourth
- Website: fdacs.gov

The commissioner of agriculture is a constitutional officer in the executive branch of government of the U.S. state of Florida that heads the Florida Department of Agriculture and Consumer Services (FDACS). Elected for a four-year mandate that is limited to two consecutive terms of office, the commissioner of agriculture is charged with supporting and regulating Florida's agriculture industry, conserving soil and water resources, managing state forests, protecting consumers from unfair trade practices, and ensuring the safety and wholesomeness of food in the marketplace. In addition, the commissioner is one of four members of the Florida Cabinet and is fourth (behind the lieutenant governor, attorney general, and chief financial officer, respectively) in the line of succession to the office of governor. The thirteenth and current commissioner is Republican Wilton Simpson, who took office on January 3, 2023.

== History ==
The Florida Constitution of 1868 created the commissioner of immigration, whose job was to encourage farmers to settle in Florida. An 1871 amendment created a commissioner of lands and immigration while eliminating the surveyor general.

The commissioner of lands and immigration became the commissioner of agriculture when the Florida Constitution was revised in 1885. The newly renamed post also included supervision of state prisons until the Division of Corrections was established in 1957.

The Agricultural Services Reorganization Act was passed in 1959 and took effect in 1961. It eliminated a number of independent bureaus and boards while transferring their duties and responsibilities to divisions under the commissioner of agriculture. The resulting divisions included administration, animal industry, chemistry, dairy industry, fruit and vegetable inspection, inspection and standards, marketing, and plant industry.

The Office of Consumer Services was established by the legislature in 1967 under the purview of the commissioner of agriculture. Two years later, it was renamed the Division of Consumer Services under the Executive Reorganization Act of 1969. The department officially became the Florida Department of Agriculture and Consumer Services, and the 1927 Board of Forestry moved to the FDACS as the Division of Forestry. The FDACS was reorganized again in 1992 along 13 functional divisions.

== List of Florida commissioners of agriculture ==
Commissioners of agriculture by party affiliation
Party	Commissioners of agriculture
Democratic	10
Republican	3

#	Name	Term of Service	Political Party
1	Lucius B. Wombwell	1888–1900	Democratic
—	Vacant	1900–1901	
2	Benjamin E. McLin	1901–1912	Democratic
3	J. C. Luning	1912	Democratic
4	William Allen McRae	1912–1923	Democratic
5	Nathan Mayo	1923–1960	Democratic
6	Lee Thompson	1960–1961	Democratic
7	Doyle Conner	1961–1991	Democratic
8	Bob Crawford	1991–2001	Democratic
9	Terry Rhodes	2001	Democratic
10	Charles Bronson	2001–2011	Republican
11	Adam Putnam	2011–2019	Republican
12	Nikki Fried	2019–2023	Democratic
13	Wilton Simpson	2023–present	Republican
