= Old Bradford County Courthouse =

Historic courthouse in Florida, US

- U.S. National Register of Historic Places
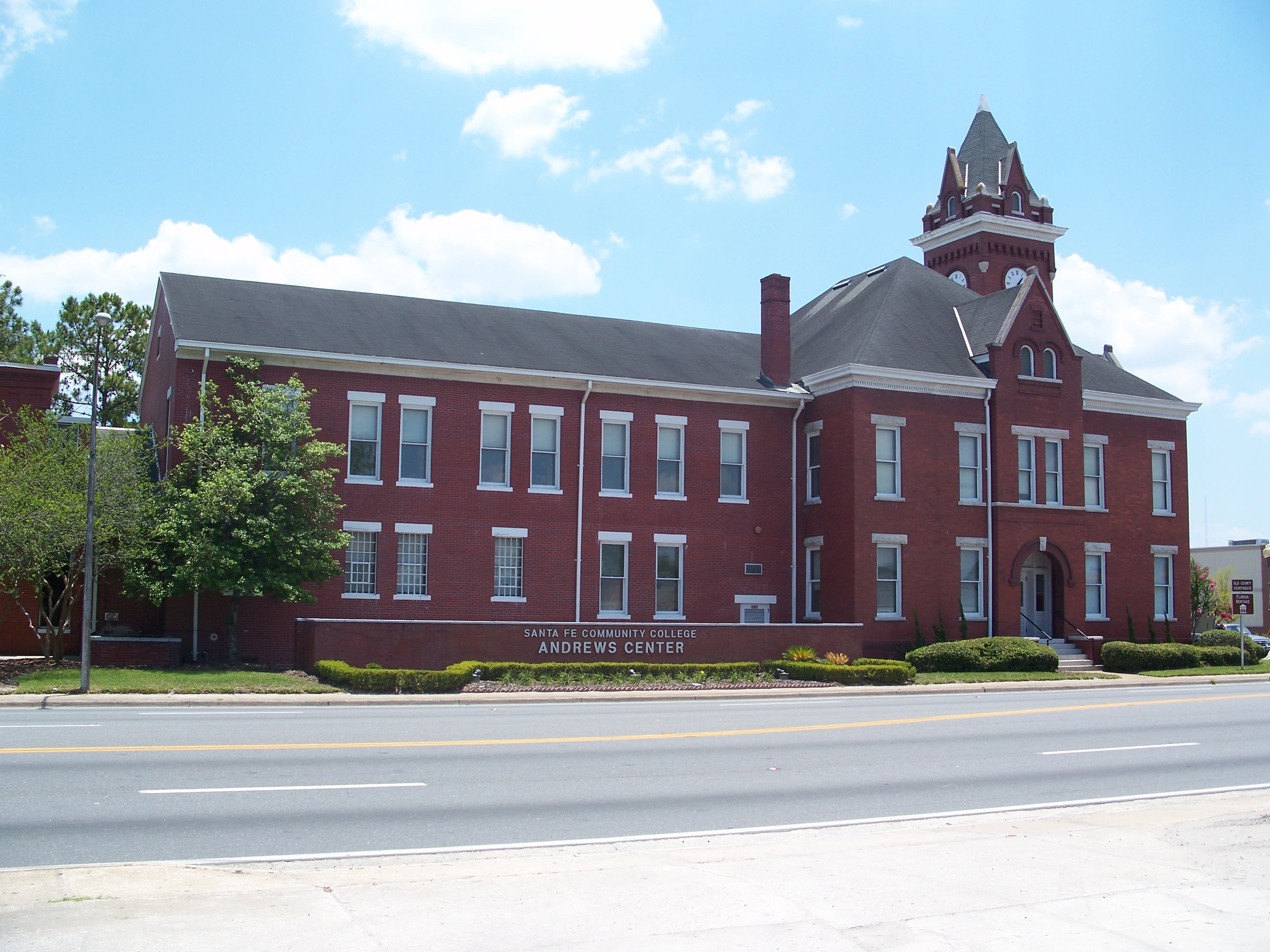
- Old Bradford County Courthouse: The wing on the left is a later addition

- Location within Florida Location within the United States
- Interactive map showing the location of Old Bradford County Courthouse
- Location: Starke, Florida
- Coordinates: 29.94472°N 82.11118°W
- Built: 1902
- Architectural style: Romanesque
- NRHP reference No.: 74000611
- Added to NRHP: December 27, 1974

The Old Bradford County Courthouse (constructed in 1902) is a historic courthouse in Starke, Florida. It is located at 209 West Call Street, off U.S. Route 301. On December 27, 1974, it was added to the U.S. National Register of Historic Places.

In 1976 the building became the Andrews Center campus of Santa Fe College. It also houses the Eugene L. Matthews Bradford County Historical Museum.
