= Starke, Florida =

- City
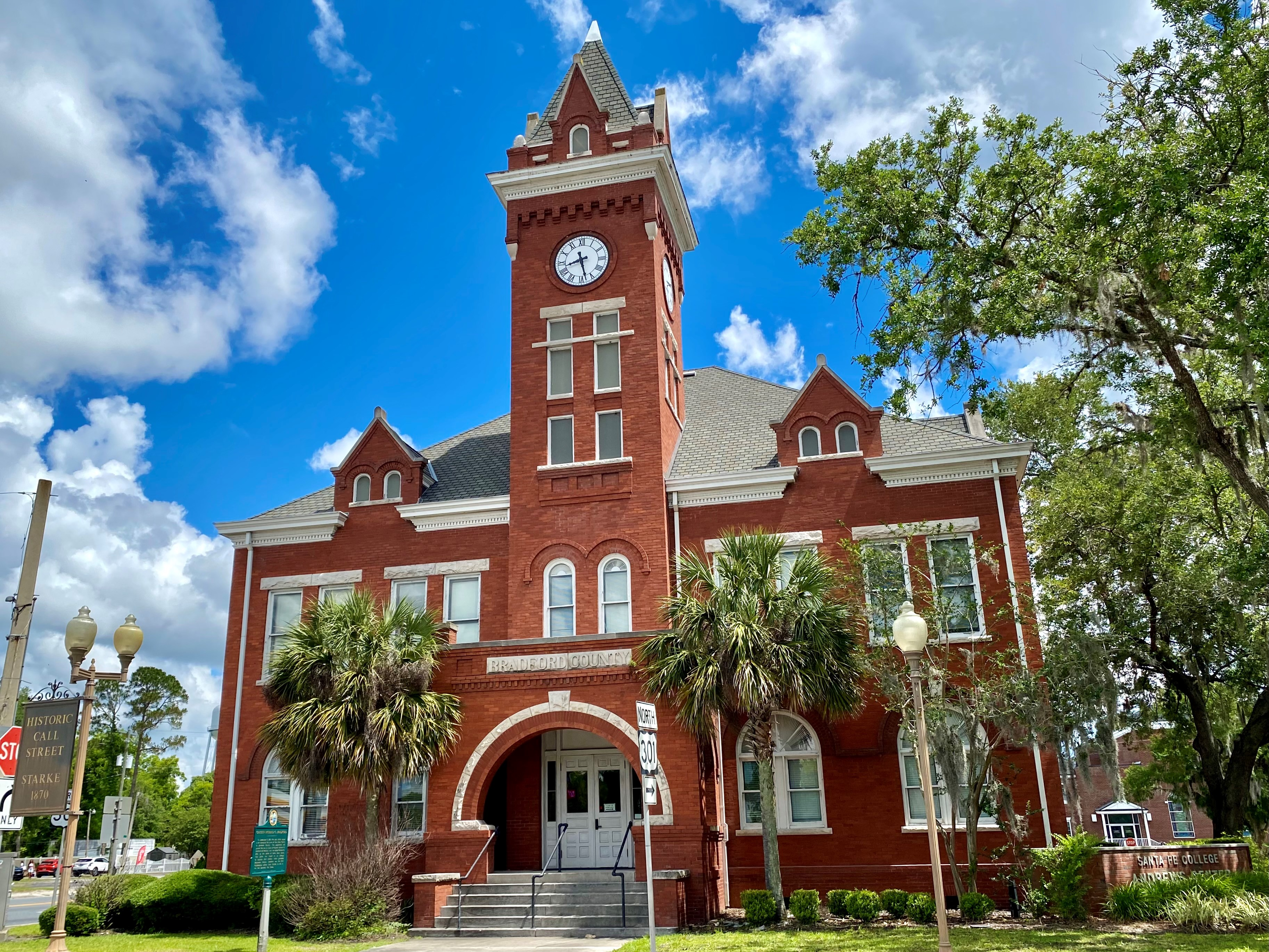
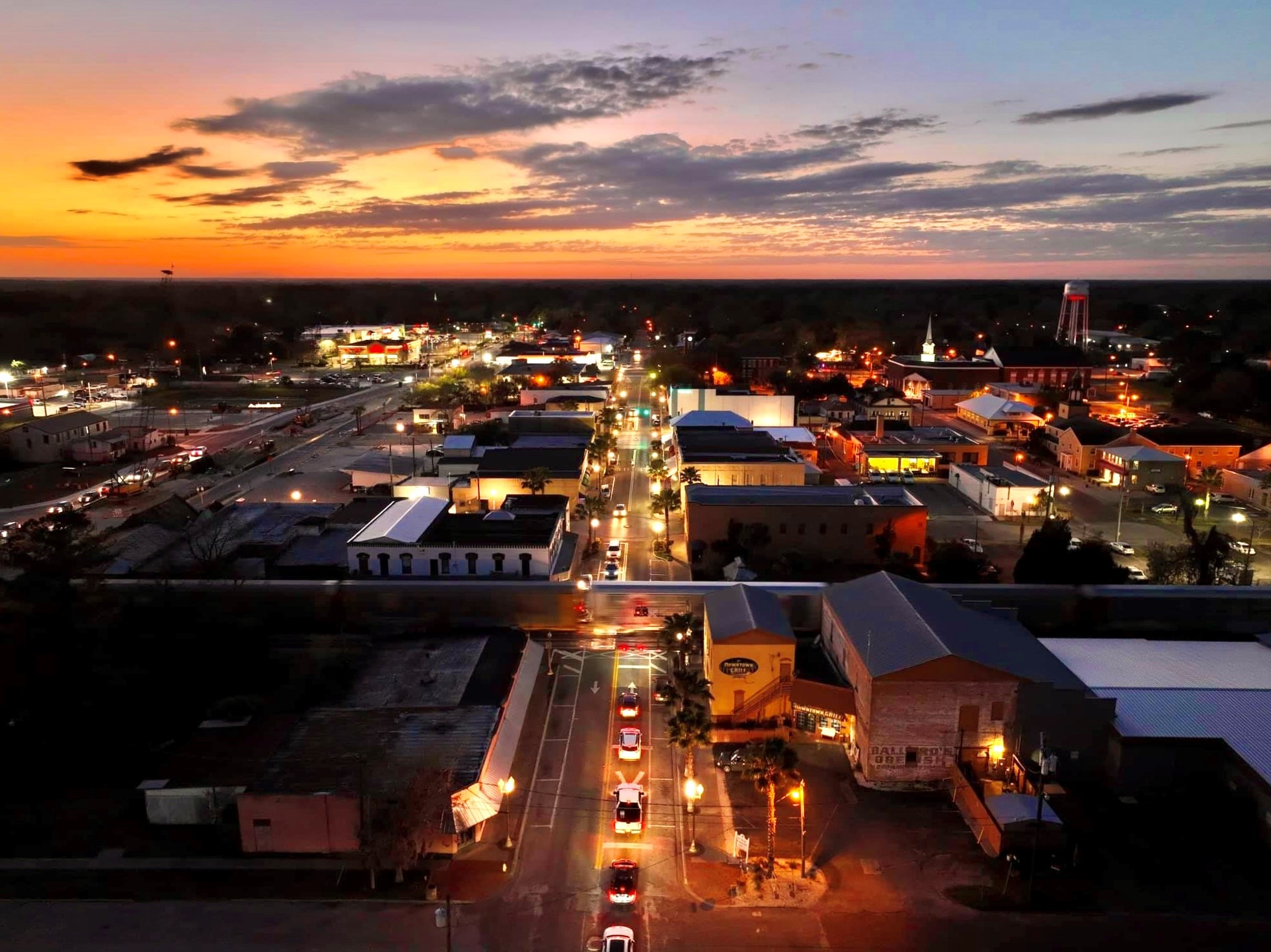
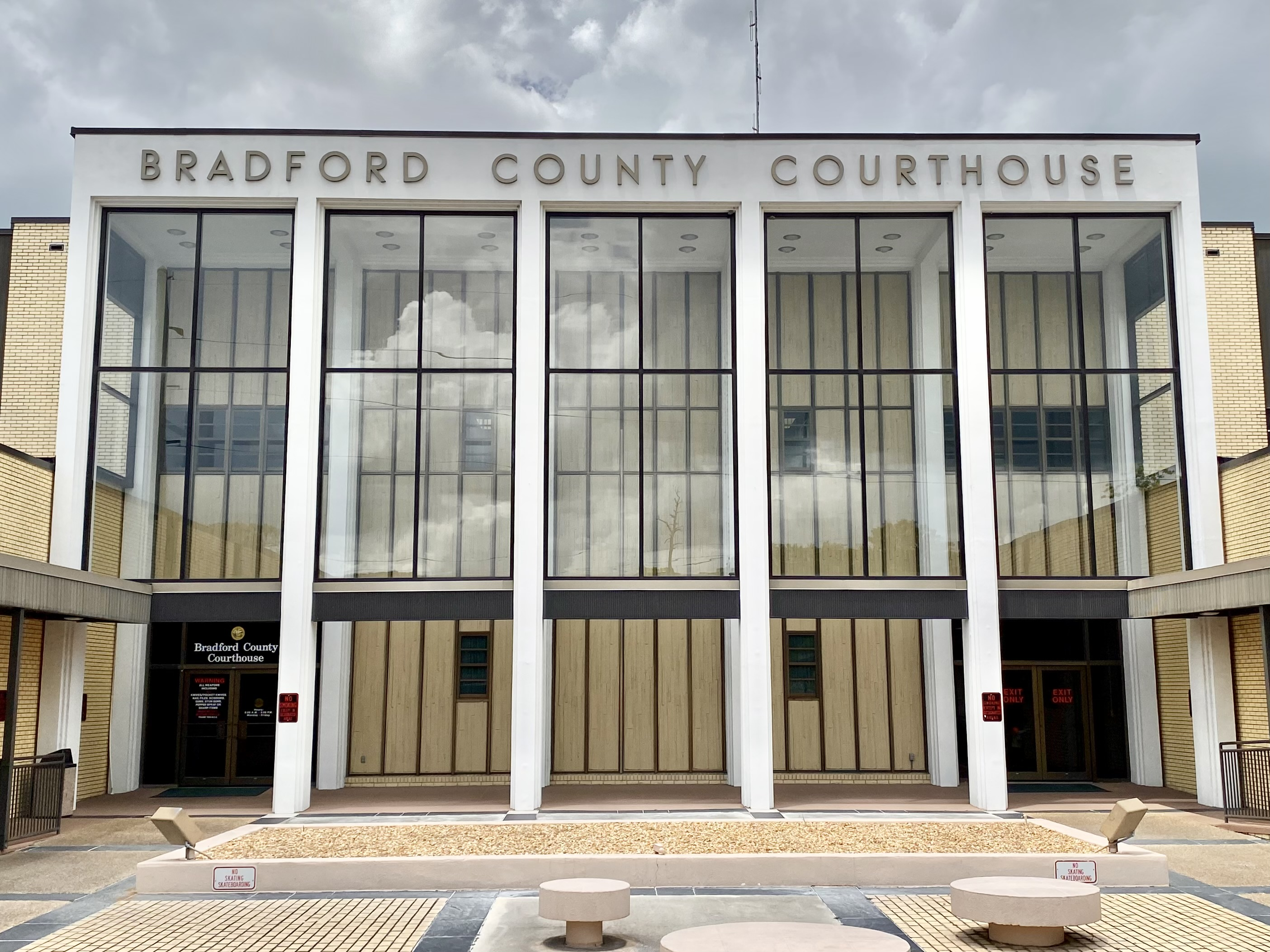
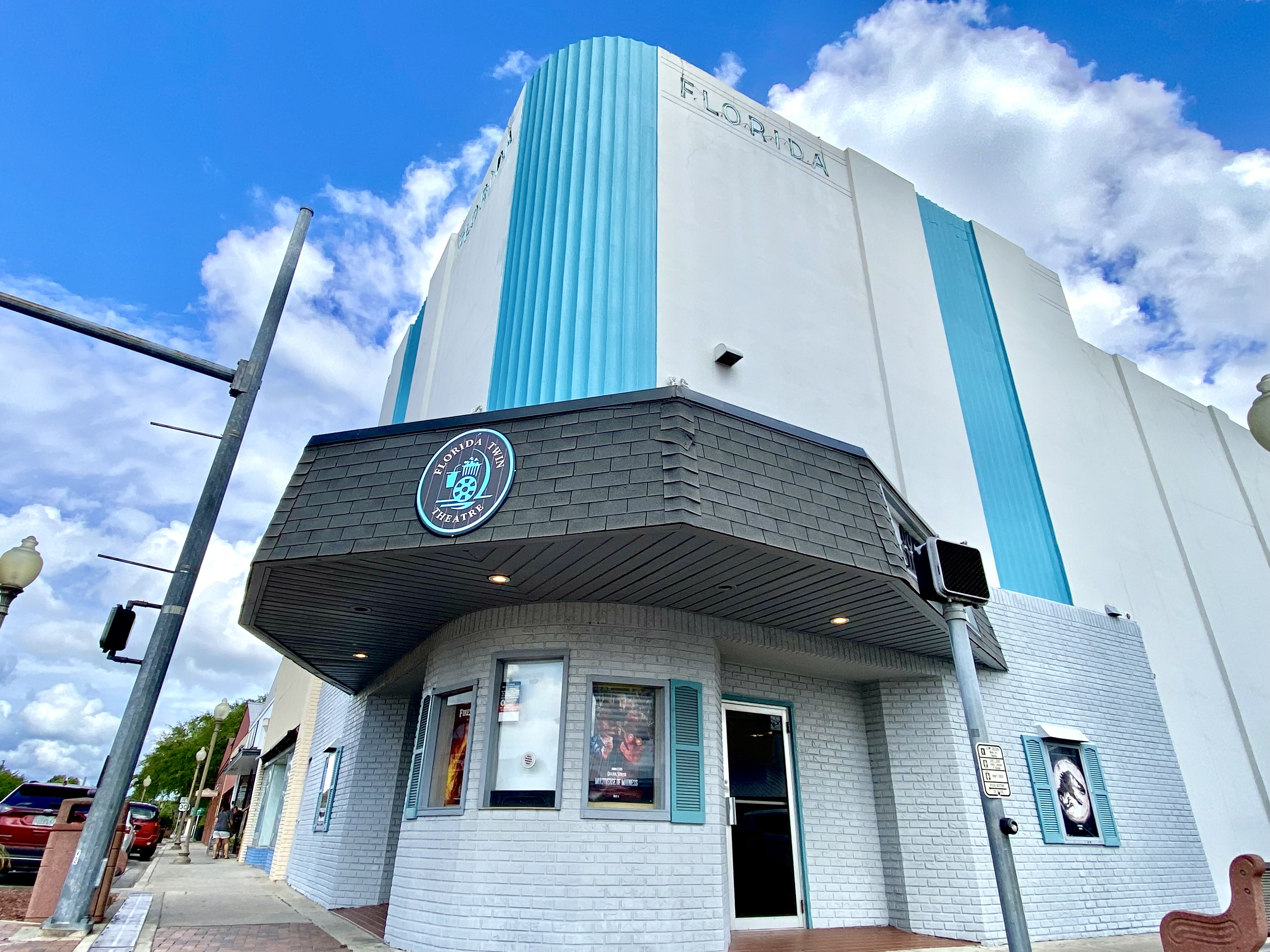
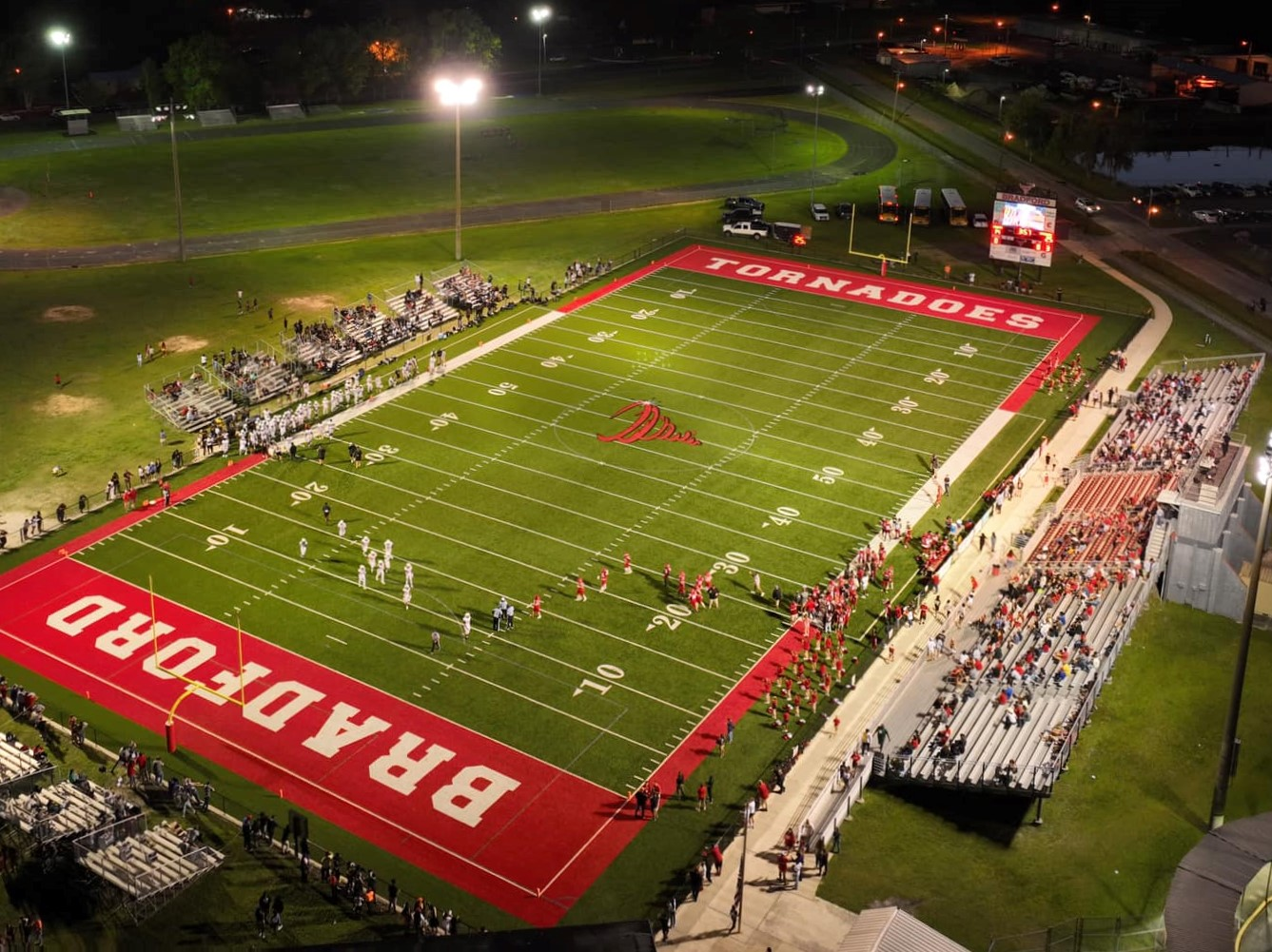
- From top, left to right: Santa Fe College's Andrews Center, Downtown Call Street at Sunset, Old Bradford County Courthouse, Florida Twin Theatre, David Hurse Stadium

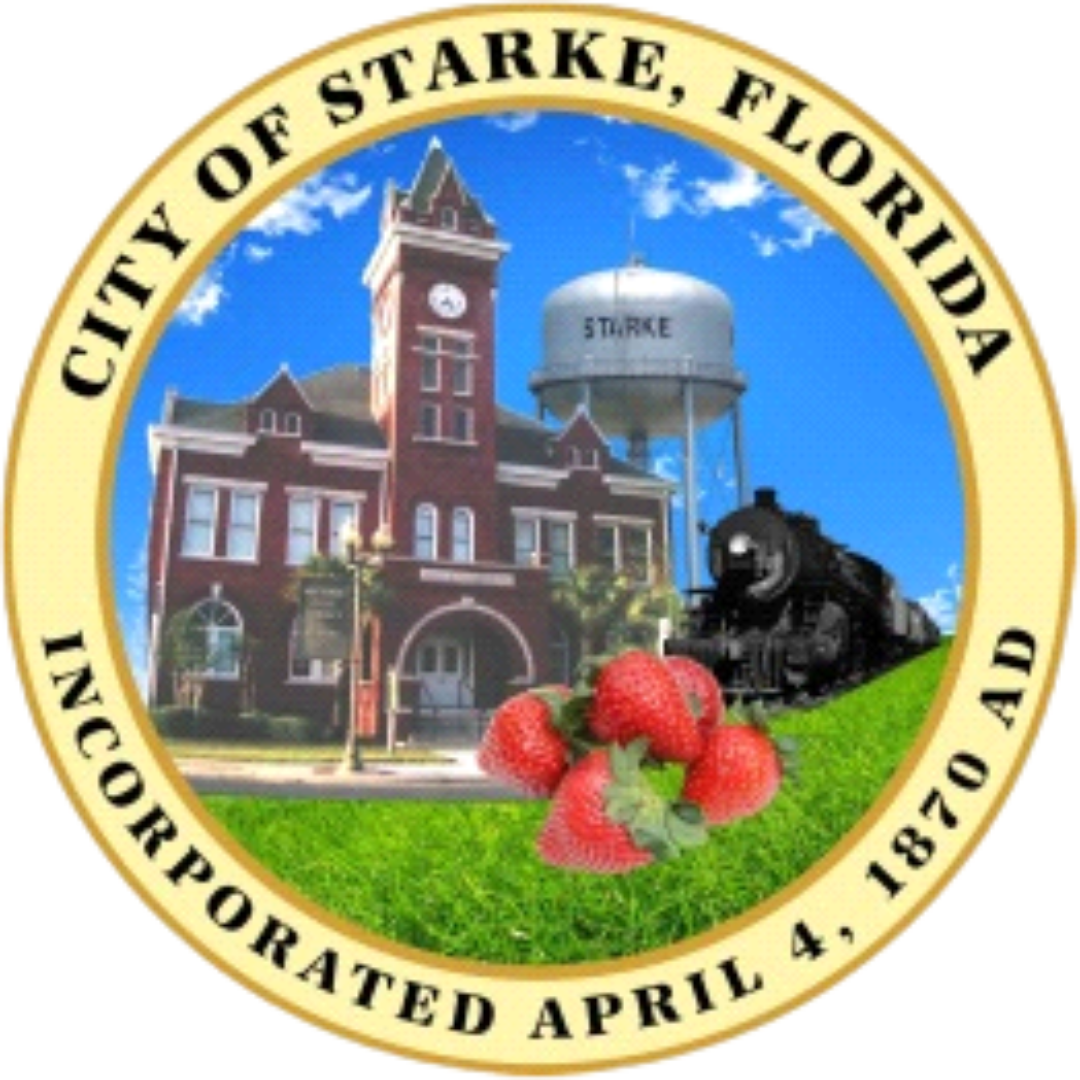
- Seal
- Motto: Southern Hospitality at its Finest
- Location in Bradford County and the state of Florida
- Coordinates: 29°56′39″N 82°06′35″W
- Country: United States
- State: Florida
- County: Bradford
- Incorporated: April 4, 1870

Government
  - Type: Commission-Manager
  - Mayor: Andy Redding
  - Vice Mayor: Janice D. Mortimer
  - Commissioners: Danny Nugent, Dimple Overstreet , Bob Milner
  - City Manager: Drew Mullins
  - City Clerk: Chrissy Thompson

Area
  - Total: 7.18 sq mi (18.59 km^{2})
  - Land: 7.18 sq mi (18.59 km^{2})
  - Water: 0 sq mi (0.00 km^{2})
- Elevation: 167 ft (51 m)

Population (2020)
  - Total: 5,796
  - Density: 837.0/sq mi (323.18/km^{2})
- Time zone: UTC-5 (Eastern (EST))
  - Summer (DST): UTC-4 (EDT)
- ZIP code: 32091
- Area codes: 904, 324
- FIPS code: 12-68525
- GNIS feature ID: 0291634
- Website: www.cityofstarke.org

Starke is a city in and the county seat of Bradford County, Florida, United States. The 2025 estimated population was 6,000. The origin of the city's name is disputed. Starke may have been named in honor of local landowner George W. Cole's fiancée's family or in honor of Madison Starke Perry, fourth governor of Florida.

== History ==
=== Founding and 19th century ===
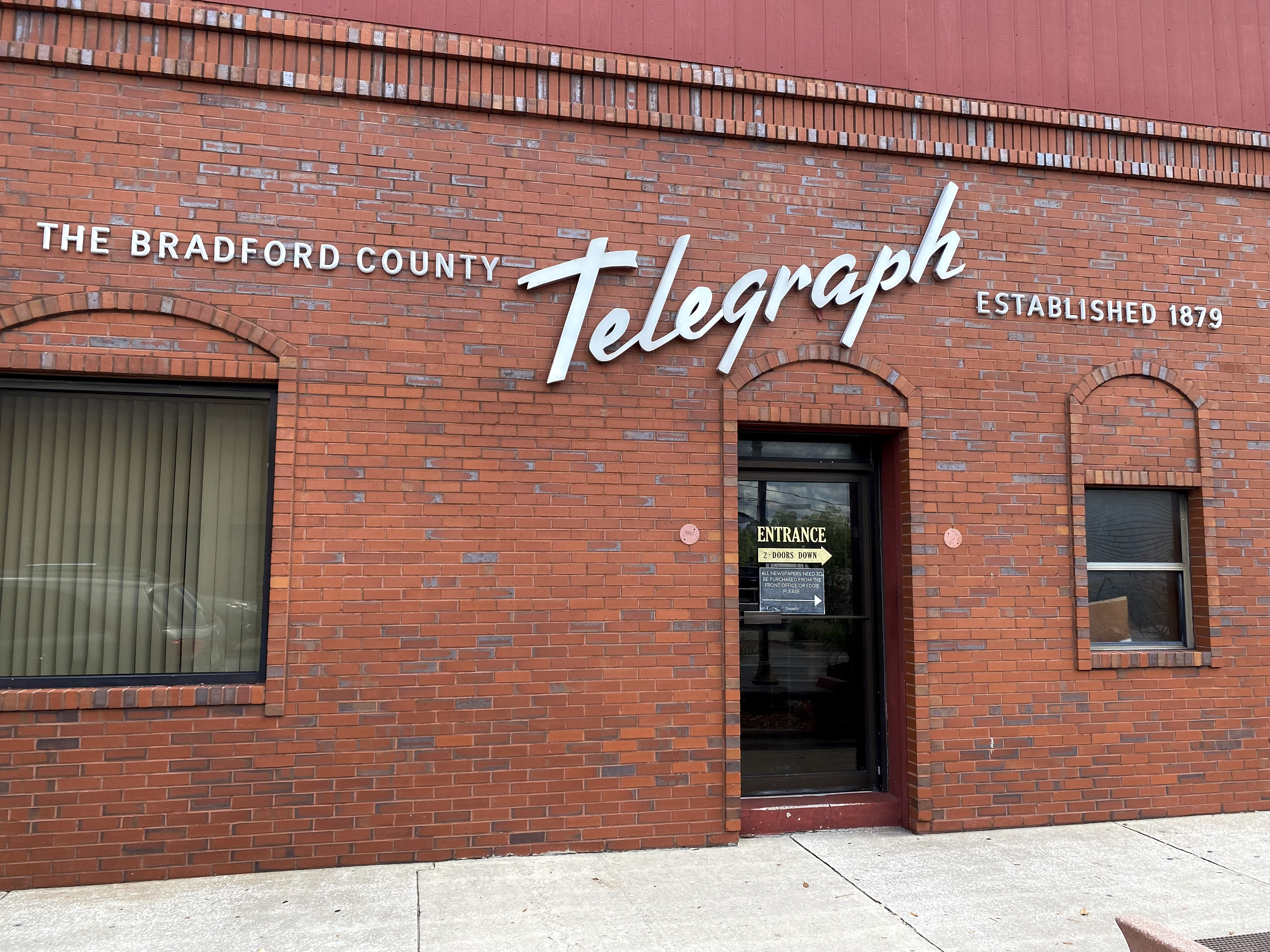
Headquarters of The Bradford County Telegraph, Florida's oldest weekly news publication.

Prior to 1857, the area that is today Starke was sparsely settled. The announcement of the Fernandina to Cedar Key railroad, which would connect the Atlantic Ocean with the Gulf of Mexico, brought the first known settlement to the community.

In November 1857, the first post office in the area was established by George W. Cole. In 1859, Cole obtained 40 acres (16 ha) of land around the post office, which were described in his documents as the "Original Town of Starke."

In 1858, the railroad reached Starke, bringing new residents to the community. The city was incorporated on April 4, 1870. In 1875, Bradford County residents narrowly voted to move the county seat from Lake Butler to Starke. Three additional votes would be taken in later years on the location of the county seat, before the Florida Legislature resolved the issue in 1921, with the creation of Union County.

Starke's weekly newspaper, The Bradford County Telegraph, began publication in 1879 as The Florida Weekly Telegraph (it continues to be the oldest weekly newspaper in Florida today). The city experienced tremendous growth in the 1880s and 1890s from Florida's citrus industry. Northerners moved to the area in droves to take a stake in the industry, but the state's Great Freeze that, came in the winter of 1894-1895 devastated the area's orange groves, moving the citrus industry further south.

The City's electric utility is the oldest public power provider in the State of Florida, founded in 1890.

=== 20th and 21st centuries ===
Starke oversaw a period of rapid expansion brought on by the new U.S. Highway 301 in the early 1900s, and the construction of Camp Blanding during World War II.

For travelers coming from the northeastern United States, Highway 301 was the quickest route between Jacksonville and Tampa (a title it still holds to this day). Starke's status as one of the largest cities on the route, as well its location on State Road 100, brought numerous hotels to the area. The construction of nearby Camp Blanding as a military training facility during World War II added to the local building boom, and by 1950, the city's population had doubled.

Post-World War II, the boom continued and the area continued to see an influx of residents working in the service industry and in its strawberry fields. Bradford County's famous Strawberry Festival was born during this time, and it continues to attract thousands of visitors today.

In the late 1980s, the city received national media attention during the proceedings of the Ted Bundy case and his eventual execution at Florida State Prison in nearby Raiford, Florida. It also received attention when Lawton Chiles was Florida governor as a notorious speed trap town, even having warning billboards placed on Interstate 10's exit onto south US 301. Other speed traps on this stretch of US 301 between I-10 and I-75 were Waldo, Lawtey, and Hampton.

During this time, controversy would also arise over the cross located on the city's water tower, as national atheist groups condemned the community. In the early 2000s, a court motion was filed by American Atheists against the city to remove the cross, bringing Starke back into the national spotlight. The battle in court would prove contentious, with most city residents staunchly opposed to its removal. In 2007, a district judge ruled against the city, and the cross would later be moved to a location on private property.

In later years, American Atheists attempted to have a Ten Commandments monument removed from the courtyard of the Bradford County Courthouse. A compromise was eventually reached however in this case.

=== Starke Utilities ===
The City's electric utility was the first public power utility in the State of Florida, founded in 1890. The City is a member of Florida Municipal Power Agency and sits on the Board of Directors and Executive Committee of the Agency. Power is transmitted to the City from FMPA power generation plants via Florida Power & Light transmission lines and is then distributed to customers through the City owned distribution system.

== Geography ==
Starke is located in east-central Bradford County. U.S. Route 301 passes through the center of the city, leading north 26 miles (42 km) to Baldwin and Interstate 10 (with Jacksonville through it) and southwest (via State Road 24) 25 miles (40 km) to Gainesville.

According to the United States Census Bureau, the city has a total area of 7.2 square miles (18.7 km^{2}), all land.

Starke is located approximately 8 miles (13 km) west of Florida's National Guard base, Camp Blanding, and is approximately 10 miles (16 km) southeast of Florida State Prison, Union Correctional Institution, and New River East Correctional Institution.

=== Climate ===
Starke has a humid subtropical climate (Cfa).

Climate data for Starke, Florida, 1991–2020 normals, extremes 1958–2019
Month	Jan	Feb	Mar	Apr	May	Jun	Jul	Aug	Sep	Oct	Nov	Dec	Year
Record high °F (°C)	84 (29)	88 (31)	90 (32)	95 (35)	97 (36)	100 (38)	99 (37)	101 (38)	97 (36)	95 (35)	92 (33)	87 (31)	101 (38)
Mean daily maximum °F (°C)	68.3 (20.2)	71.1 (21.7)	76.3 (24.6)	81.9 (27.7)	87.4 (30.8)	91.8 (33.2)	92.4 (33.6)	92.0 (33.3)	89.1 (31.7)	83.0 (28.3)	76.3 (24.6)	70.9 (21.6)	81.7 (27.6)
Daily mean °F (°C)	56.8 (13.8)	59.2 (15.1)	64.2 (17.9)	69.9 (21.1)	76.5 (24.7)	82.1 (27.8)	83.3 (28.5)	82.9 (28.3)	80.2 (26.8)	72.7 (22.6)	64.5 (18.1)	59.0 (15.0)	70.9 (21.6)
Mean daily minimum °F (°C)	45.3 (7.4)	47.4 (8.6)	52.1 (11.2)	58.0 (14.4)	65.6 (18.7)	72.5 (22.5)	74.2 (23.4)	73.7 (23.2)	71.3 (21.8)	62.4 (16.9)	52.7 (11.5)	47.1 (8.4)	60.2 (15.7)
Record low °F (°C)	8 (−13)	21 (−6)	22 (−6)	34 (1)	39 (4)	44 (7)	59 (15)	58 (14)	45 (7)	30 (−1)	17 (−8)	10 (−12)	8 (−13)
Average precipitation inches (mm)	3.96 (101)	3.02 (77)	3.14 (80)	2.60 (66)	3.70 (94)	8.17 (208)	7.13 (181)	6.42 (163)	5.90 (150)	4.34 (110)	2.27 (58)	2.70 (69)	53.35 (1,355)
Average precipitation days (≥ 0.01 in)	6.7	6.8	6.6	5.5	5.8	11.3	13.6	13.8	10.8	5.9	4.5	6.2	97.5
Source: NOAA

== Demographics ==
Historical population
Census	Pop.	Note	%±
1880	292		—
1890	669		129.1%
1900	972		45.3%
1910	1,135		16.8%
1920	1,023		−9.9%
1930	1,339		30.9%
1940	1,480		10.5%
1950	2,944		98.9%
1960	4,806		63.2%
1970	4,848		0.9%
1980	5,306		9.4%
1990	5,226		−1.5%
2000	5,593		7.0%
2010	5,449		−2.6%
2020	5,796		6.4%
U.S. Decennial Census

=== Racial and ethnic composition ===
Starke racial composition (Hispanics excluded from racial categories) (NH = Non-Hispanic)
Race	Pop 2010	Pop 2020	% 2010	% 2020
White (NH)	3,451	3,423	63.33%	59.06%
Black or African American (NH)	1,586	1,690	29.11%	29.16%
Native American or Alaska Native (NH)	15	22	0.28%	0.38%
Asian (NH)	58	54	1.06%	0.93%
Pacific Islander or Native Hawaiian (NH)	1	7	0.02%	0.12%
Some other race (NH)	7	21	0.13%	0.36%
Two or more races/Multiracial (NH)	124	254	2.28%	4.38%
Hispanic or Latino (any race)	207	325	3.80%	5.61%
Total	5,449	5,796		

=== 2020 census ===
As of the 2020 census, Starke had a population of 5,796. The median age was 39.4 years. 24.3% of residents were under the age of 18 and 20.4% of residents were 65 years of age or older. For every 100 females there were 88.5 males, and for every 100 females age 18 and over there were 86.7 males age 18 and over.

95.6% of residents lived in urban areas, while 4.4% lived in rural areas.

There were 2,168 households in Starke, of which 33.7% had children under the age of 18 living in them. Of all households, 34.4% were married-couple households, 19.8% were households with a male householder and no spouse or partner present, and 39.0% were households with a female householder and no spouse or partner present. About 30.0% of all households were made up of individuals and 13.4% had someone living alone who was 65 years of age or older.

There were 2,462 housing units, of which 11.9% were vacant. The homeowner vacancy rate was 2.6% and the rental vacancy rate was 9.7%.

The 2016-2020 ACS 5-year estimates reported 1,215 families residing in the city.

=== 2010 census ===
As of the 2010 United States census, there were 5,449 people, 2,062 households, and 1,329 families residing in the city.

=== 2000 census ===
As of the census of 2000, there were 5,593 people, 2,003 households, and 1,350 families residing in the city. The population density was 839.3 inhabitants per square mile (324.1/km^{2}). There were 2,273 housing units at an average density of 341.1 units per square mile (131.7 units/km^{2}). The racial makeup of the city was 67.05% White, 29.54% African American, 0.21% Native American, 1.25% Asian, 0.16% Pacific Islander, 0.64% from other races, and 1.14% from two or more races. Hispanic or Latino of any race were 2.23% of the population.

In 2000, there were 2,003 households, out of which 32.7% had children under the age of 18 living with them, 43.3% were married couples living together, 20.0% had a female householder with no husband present, and 32.6% were non-families. 28.0% of all households were made up of individuals, and 13.6% had someone living alone who was 65 years of age or older. The average household size was 2.57 and the average family size was 3.14.

In 2000, in the city, the population was spread out, with 26.7% under the age of 18, 9.7% from 18 to 24, 25.1% from 25 to 44, 20.3% from 45 to 64, and 18.1% who were 65 years of age or older. The median age was 36 years. For every 100 females, there were 86.2 males. For every 100 females age 18 and over, there were 81.1 males.

In 2000, the median income for a household in the city was $27,021, and the median income for a family was $35,093. Males had a median income of $27,176 versus $17,986 for females. The per capita income for the city was $13,507. About 19.2% of families and 23.9% of the population were below the poverty line, including 34.9% of those under age 18 and 23.2% of those age 65 or over.

== Arts and culture ==
=== Points of interest ===
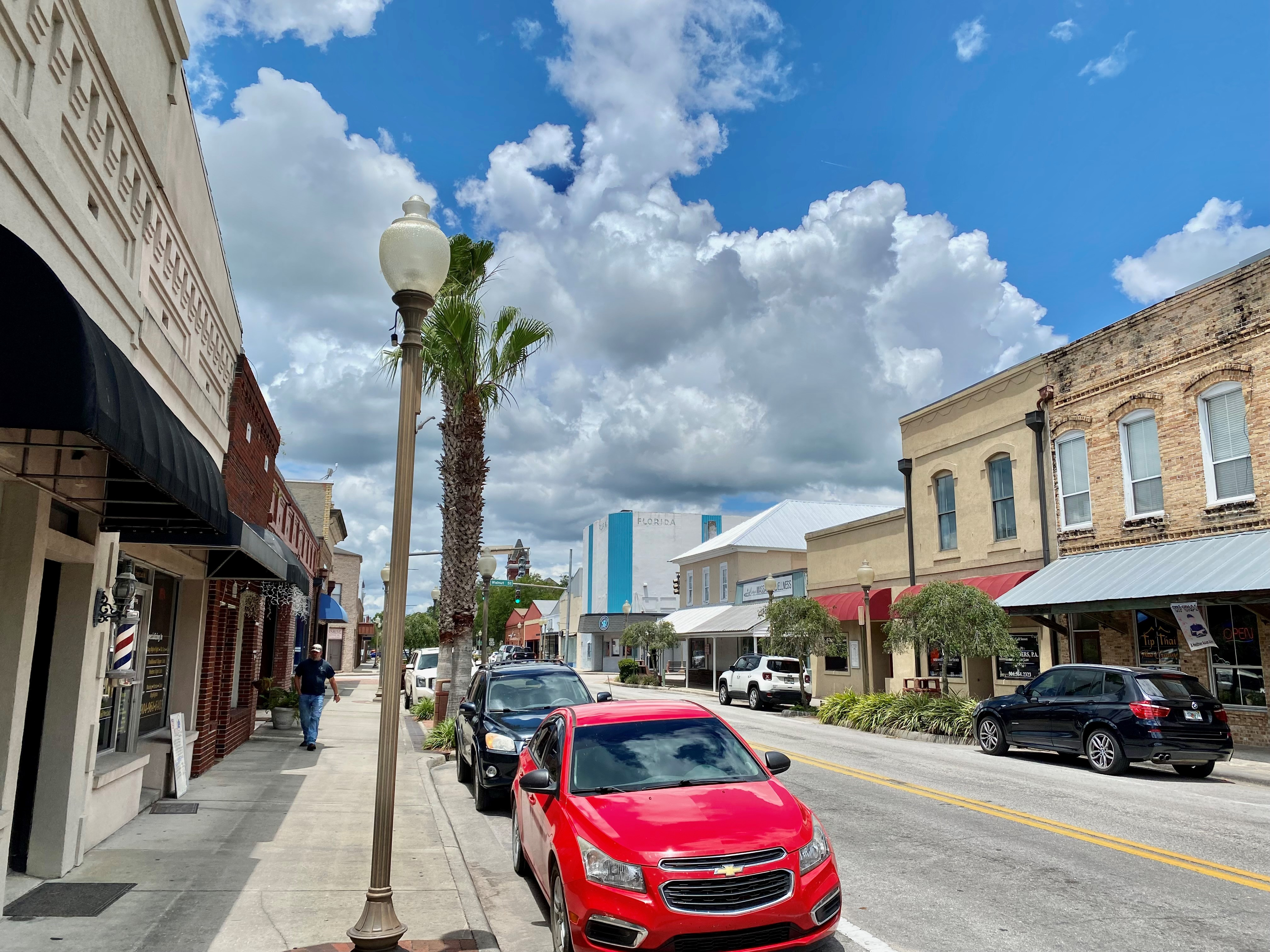
Looking west on Starke's Call Street. Call Street is listed on the National Register of Historic Places

- Call Street Historic District - Starke's downtown is home to locally owned restaurants, antique shops, a jewelry store, and a movie theatre.
- Bradford County Strawberry Festival - In 1998, city and county residents came together to start the Strawberry Festival to recognize the importance of the strawberry crop in the community. The two day festival, which is held the first week of April, attracts thousands of visitors annually.
- Eugene L. Matthews Historical Museum - This museum, named after the longtime editor of The Bradford County Telegraph, showcases many items from Bradford County's history. It is open select days of the month, or by appointment.
- Andrews Center - Formerly the old Bradford County Courthouse, the Romanesque-style structure built in 1902 is on the National Register of Historic Places. It is widely considered to be the centerpiece of Starke and its distinctive look makes it one of the most recognizable symbols of the city and Bradford County.
- Florida Twin Theatre - Having opened in 1941, the Florida Twin Theatre is one of the oldest movie theatres in north Florida. The theatre has been a popular destination for travelers from around the region for decades.

== Government ==
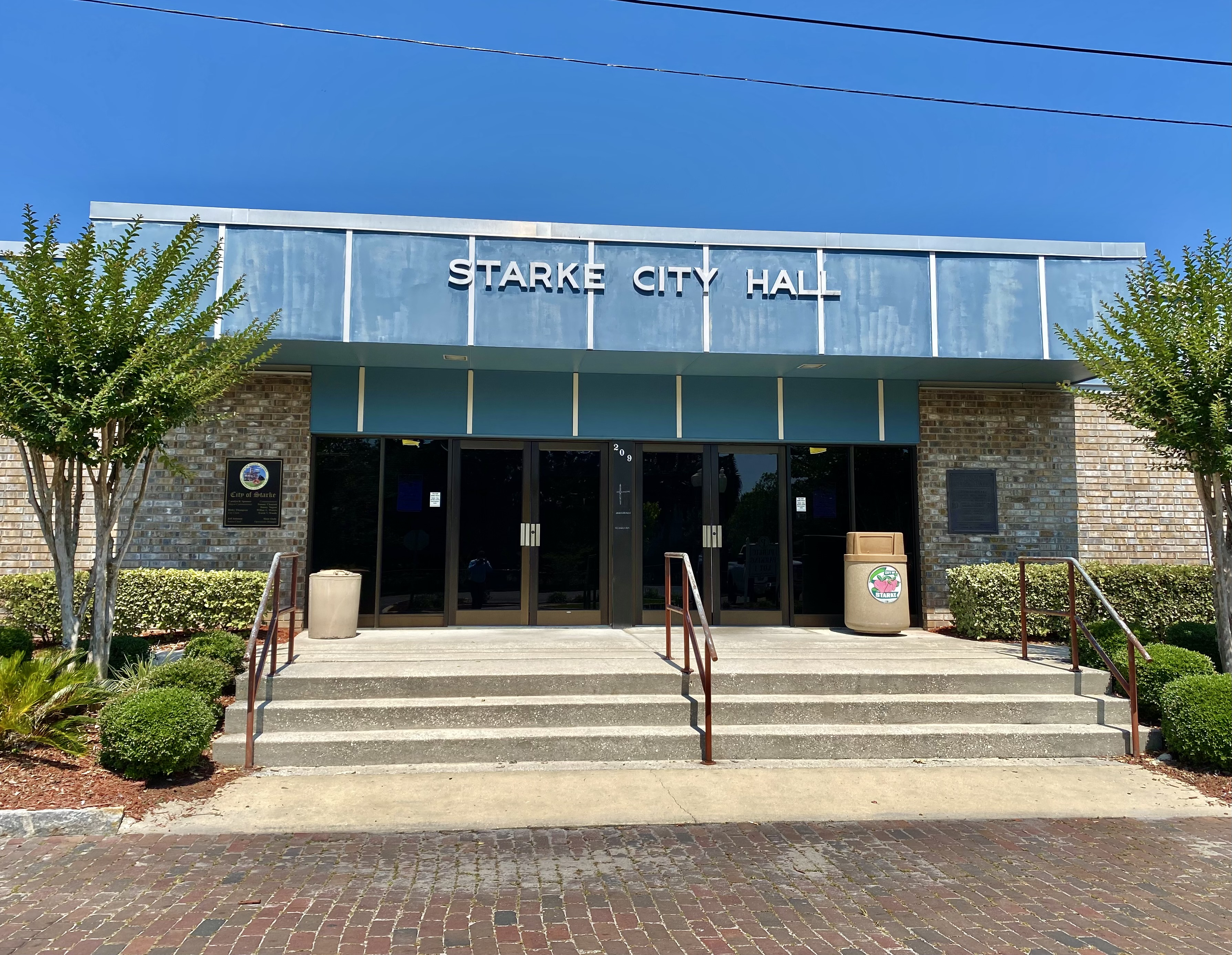
Starke City Hall

Starke has a Commission-Manager form of government, with a mayor, vice mayor and three council members, all elected to single member districts. In addition, the City Clerk is an elected positions. Starke City Officials serve four-year terms.

The current city commissioners are:

- District 1: Danny Nugent
- District 2: Janice Mortimer (Vice Mayor)
- District 3: Bob Milner
- District 4: Dimple Overstreet
- District 5: Andy Redding (Mayor)

The City Manager is Russell A. Mullins, and the City Clerk is Chrissy Thompson.

== Education ==
- Bradford High School
- Bradford Middle School
- Starke Elementary School
- Bradford Elementary School (As of 2023).

Southside Elementary School officially closed its doors in November 2023, having been used temporarily in light of the new school site being built for the current staff and students. The school building itself will be utilized as the new School District office. Schools within Starke are operated by the Bradford County School District. In addition, the Bradford County Public Library is in Starke. It is a part of the New River Public Library Cooperative.

=== Higher education ===
- Santa Fe College's Andrews Center serves Bradford county as an important learning and cultural institution.
- North Florida Technical College (Bradford-Union Technical Center), a tertiary institution managed by the school district, is in Starke.

== Media ==
=== Film and television locations ===
Starke has been the location of several Hollywood films, including:

- G.I. Jane, which starred Demi Moore and was filmed east of Starke on the Camp Blanding Joint Training Center.
- Joel Schumacher's film Tigerland, starring Colin Farrell was filmed at Camp Blanding.
- Basic starring Samuel L. Jackson and John Travolta was filmed at Camp Blanding.
- Why Do Fools Fall in Love starring Halle Berry and Vivica A. Fox.

Starke has been the location of the following television series:

- The Fox Broadcasting Company's reality TV show Boot Camp.

== Notable people ==
- Judy Canova, film actress and entertainer
- Doyle Edward Conner Sr, former Speaker of the Florida House of Representatives
- Charley Eugene Johns, 32nd Governor of Florida, former Florida State Senate President
