= List of awards and nominations received by Marie Osmond =

Marie Osmond awards and nominations
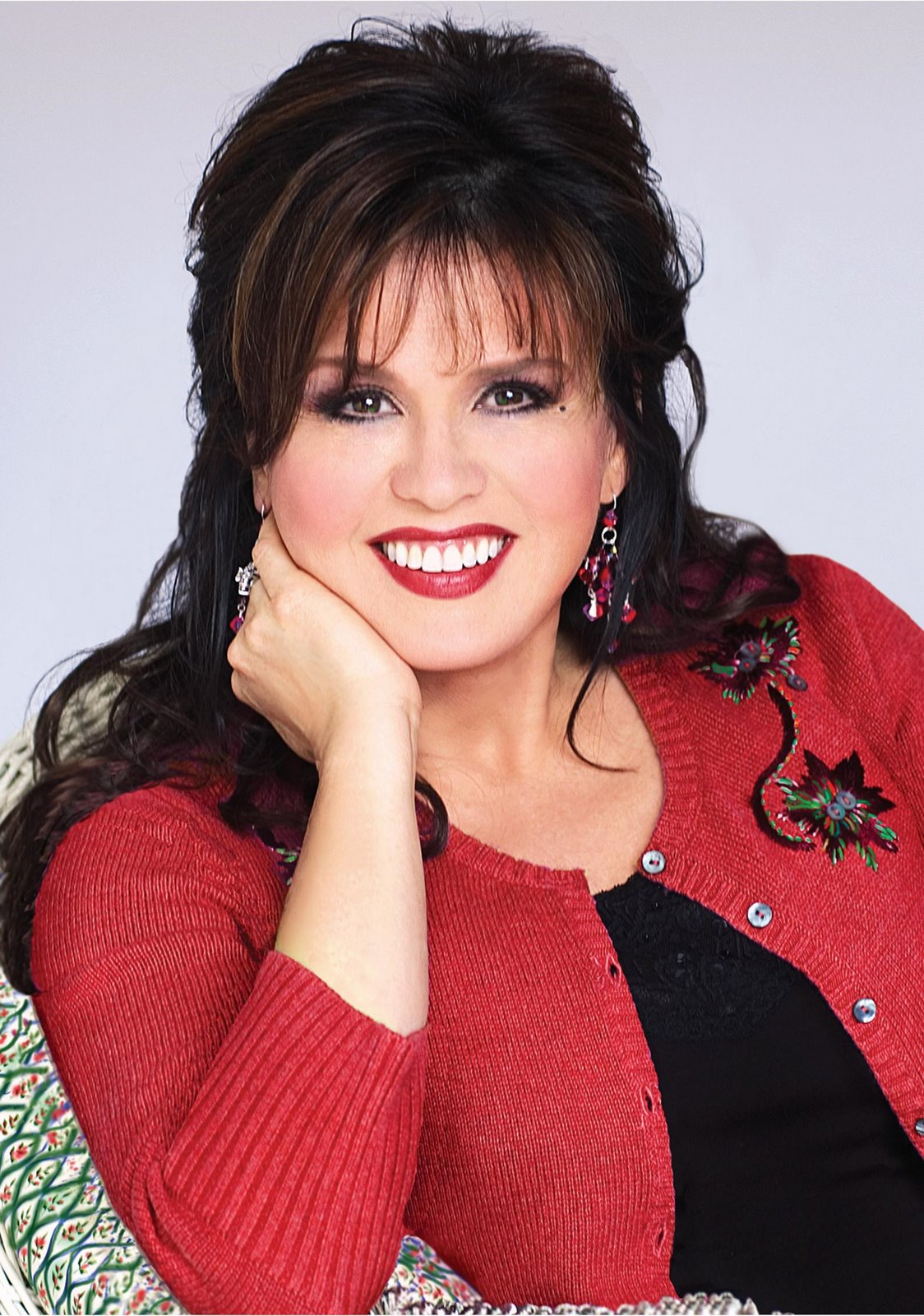
- Osmond in 2009
Awards and nominations
Award	Wins	Nominations
Academy of Country Music	0	4
Country Music Association	1	1
Grammy Awards	0	3

Totals (Note: Certain award groups do not simply award one winner. They acknowledge several different recipients, have runners-up, and have third place. Since this is a specific recognition and is different from losing an award, runner-up mentions are considered wins in this award tally. For simplification and to avoid errors, each award in this list has been presumed to have had a prior nomination.)
- Wins: 10
- Nominations: 10

American singer, actress, television personality, author and businesswoman Marie Osmond has received ten awards and ten nominations for her work in various sectors. Her first nominations were given by the Grammy Awards in 1974 for Best New Artist and Best Country Vocal Performance, Female. She would be nominated a third time ten years later. She was nominated four times by the Academy of Country Music Awards for Top Female Vocalist, Top Vocal Duet and Country Music Video of the Year. In 1986, the Country Music Association Awards presented her and Dan Seals with an accolade for Vocal Duo of the Year for their duet of "Meet Me in Montana". She also received an accolade alongside brother Donny Osmond from the American Music Awards in 1974.

In other sectors, Osmond has been nominated twice by the Daytime Emmy Awards for the talk show Donny & Marie. She has won two accolades from the TV Land Awards. For her contributions to charity and helping those in need, Osmond has won accolades from the Golden Rule Awards and the Paul Mitchell Awards.

== Academy of Country Music Awards ==
Year	Nominee / work	Award	Result	Ref.
1985	"Meet Me in Montana"	Top Vocal Duet (with Dan Seals)	Nominated	
1986	Marie Osmond	Top Female Vocalist	Nominated	
1986	"You're Still New to Me"	Top Vocal Duet (with Paul Davis)	Nominated	
1986	"I Only Wanted You"	Country Music Video of the Year	Nominated	

== American Music Awards ==
Year	Nominee / work	Award	Result	Ref.
1976	Donny Osmond and Marie Osmond	Favorite Country Band/Duo/Group	Won	

== Best of Las Vegas Awards ==
Year	Nominee / work	Award	Result	Ref.
2012	Donny and Marie Osmond	Best Show	Won	
2012	Donny and Marie Osmond	Best All-Around Performer	Won	
2012	Donny and Marie Osmond	Best Singer	Won	

== Country Music Association Awards ==
Year	Nominee / work	Award	Result	Ref.
1986	Dan Seals and Marie Osmond	Vocal Duo of the Year	Won	
1987	Dan Seals and Marie Osmond	Vocal Duo of the Year	Nominated	

== Daytime Emmy Awards ==
Year	Nominee / work	Award	Result	Ref.
2000	Donny & Marie	Outstanding Daytime Talk Series Host	Nominated	
2001	Donny & Marie	Outstanding Daytime Talk Series Host	Nominated	

== Golden Rule Awards ==
Year	Nominee / work	Award	Result	Ref.
2022	Marie Osmond	Paul Eppinger Award	Won	

== Grammy Awards ==
Year	Nominee / work	Award	Result	Ref.
1974	Marie Osmond	Best New Artist	Nominated	
1974	"Paper Roses"	Best Country Vocal Performance, Female	Nominated	
1986	"Meet Me in Montana" (with Dan Seals)	Best Country Performance By a Duo or Group with Vocal	Nominated	

== Nevada Ballet Theatre ==
Year	Nominee / work	Award	Result	Ref.
2010	Marie Osmond	Woman of the Year	Won	

== Paul Mitchell Awards ==
Year	Nominee / work	Award	Result	Ref.
2016	Marie Osmond	Andrew Gomez Compassionate Service Award	Won	

== TV Land Awards ==
Year	Nominee / work	Award	Result	Ref.
2005	Donny and Marie Osmond	Favorite Singing Siblings	Won	
2015	Donny and Marie Osmond	The Pop Culture Award	Won	
