= Cool Night =

Studio album by Paul Davis
- Released: November 30, 1981
- Recorded: In full digital, Winter 1980 to early 1981.
- Studio: Web IV Studios (Atlanta, Georgia)
- Genre: Soft rock
- Length: 38:00
- Label: Arista
- Producer: Ed Seay; Paul Davis

Paul Davis chronology
Paul Davis (1980)	Cool Night (1981)	The Best of Paul Davis (1982)

Professional ratings
Review scores
Source	Rating
Allmusic	3/5 stars

Cool Night is the seventh and final studio album by singer/songwriter Paul Davis. It was his highest-charting album in the United States, reaching #52 on the Billboard album chart, and yielded three top-40 singles, "Cool Night", "'65 Love Affair", and "Love or Let Me Be Lonely". The third was a remake of a song by The Friends of Distinction. This album was the first to be both recorded and mixed fully digitally. It features backing vocals by the Commodores who were simultaneously recording their 1981 album In the Pocket. While the album was a commercial success, Davis hated it, so much so that he ended his contract with Arista to sign with a much smaller label, before retiring from the music industry in 1988.

This album included all 4 members of the Atlanta-based band Whiteface, which were Doug Bare, Benny Rappa, Steve Hardwick, and Barry Dunaway, who took over bass when Kyle Henderson left Whiteface to form the new wave power pop band The Producers. Hardwick and Rappa also toured with Davis and can be seen in numerous live videos.

== Track listing ==
All tracks were written by Paul Davis except where noted.

1. "Cool Night" – 3:40
2. "You Came to Me" (Davis, Joe Wilson, Mike Hughes) – 3:38
3. "One More Time for the Lonely" – 4:09
4. "Nathan Jones" (Leonard Caston Jr., Kathy Wakefield) – 3:27
5. "Oriental Eyes" – 4:28
6. "'65 Love Affair" – 3:54
7. "Somebody's Gettin' to You" – 3:30
8. "Love or Let Me Be Lonely" (Skip Scarborough, Jerry Peters, Anita Poree) – 3:41
9. "What You Got to Say About Love" (Davis, Doug Bare, Ben Rappa) – 3:53
10. "We're Still Together" – 3:40

== Personnel ==
- Paul Davis – vocals, keyboards
- Doug Bare – keyboards
- Tommy Cooper – keyboards
- Ed Seay – keyboards, bass, backing vocals
- Vance Taylor – keyboards
- Steve Hardwick – guitars
- Rick Hinkle – guitars
- Barry Dunaway – bass
- Steve Tischer – bass
- Gene Chrisman – drums
- Jean T. McHine – drums
- Benny Rappa – drums, backing vocals
- Carol Veto – backing vocals

== Production ==
- Paul Davis – producer
- Ed Seay – producer, engineer
- Tommy Cooper – engineer
- Jim Loyd – mastering at Masterfonics (Nashville, Tennessee)
- Donn Davenport – art direction
- Neal Pozner – design
- Tom Biondo – photography
