= The Best of Marie Osmond =

Greatest hits album by Marie Osmond
- Released: September 25, 1990
- Genre: Country
- Length: 37:41
- Label: Curb
- Producer: James Stroud, Kyle Lehning, Paul Worley, Sonny James

Singles from Best of Marie Osmond
- 1. "Like a Hurricane"

The Best of Marie Osmond is a greatest hits album from American country music singer Marie Osmond. It was released September 25, 1990, on Curb Records. The album features the biggest hits of Marie's country music career to date.

Because MGM Records owned the rights to the original recording of "Paper Roses" it was not included on this album. Due to this she re-recorded it using the original producer and backup singers (the Jordanaires) in the same Nashville studio as the 1973 version.

Included on this album were two new songs titled "Think With Your Heart" and "Like a Hurricane". Like A Hurricane stayed on the Billboard Hot Country Songs for 10 weeks but only peaked at number 57.

== Track listing ==
No.	Title	Writer(s)	Length
1.	"Paper Roses"	Fred Speilman, Janice Torre	2:39
2.	"There's No Stopping Your Heart"	Michael Bonagura, Craig Karp	2:54
3.	"Meet Me in Montana" (duet with Dan Seals)	Paul Davis	3:56
4.	"Everybody's Crazy 'Bout My Baby"	Mike Reid	3:42
5.	"Like a Hurricane"	Michael Clark	3:35
6.	"Think with Your Heart"	Andy Razaf	3:39
7.	"Read My Lips"	Marc Blatte, Larry Gottlieb	3:47
8.	"I Only Wanted You"	Tom Shapiro, Michael Garvin, Bucky Jones	3:25
9.	"You're Still New to Me" (duet with Paul Davis)	Davis, Paul Overstreet	3:21
10.	"I'll Be Faithful to You"	Paul Kennerley	3:08

== Singles ==
Year	Single	US Country
1990	"Like A Hurricane"	57
