= Real Friends (The Friends of Distinction album) =

Studio album by The Friends of Distinction
- Released: 1970
- Studio: RCA's Music Center of the World (Hollywood, California)
- Genre: Soul
- Label: RCA Victor
- Producer: Ray Cork, Jr.

The Friends of Distinction chronology
Highly Distinct (1969)	Real Friends (1970)	Whatever (1970)

Real Friends is the third studio album by R&B group The Friends of Distinction, released in 1970 on the RCA Victor label.

== Chart performance ==
The album peaked at No. 9 on the R&B albums chart. It also reached No. 68 on the Billboard 200. The album features the single "Love or Let Me Be Lonely", which peaked at No. 6 on the Billboard Hot 100 and No. 13 on the Hot Soul Singles chart.

== Track listing ==
Side one
No.	Title	Writer(s)	Length
1.	"Love or Let Me Be Lonely"	Skip Scarborough, Jerry Peters, Anita Poree	3:23
2.	"Lady Mae"	Anita Poree, Greg Poree, Jerry Peters	4:55
3.	"It Don't Matter to Me"	David Gates	3:22
4.	"My Mind Is a Camera"	Anita Poree, Jerry Peters	3:55
5.	"Out in the Country"	Jerry Peters	4:50

Side two
No.	Title	Writer(s)	Length
6.	"Any Way You Want Me"	James Griffin, Robb Royer	3:15
7.	"Crazy Mary"	Anita Poree, Jerry Peters	4:59
8.	"Just a Little Lovin'"	Barry Mann, Cynthia Weil	3:31
9.	"Long Time Comin' My Way"	Harry Elston, Terry Evans	2:40
10.	"On & On"	Anita Poree, Jerry Peters	3:50

== Personnel ==
- Jessica Cleaves, Charlene Gibson, Harry Elston, Floyd Butler – vocals

== Charts ==
Chart (1970)	Peak position
U.S. Billboard Top LPs	68
U.S. Billboard Top Soul LPs	9

Singles

Year	Single	Peak		
Year	Single	US	US R&B	US A/C
1970	"Love or Let Me Be Lonely"	6	13	9
