= Billboard Year-End Hot 100 singles of 1982 =

Ranking of recorded music

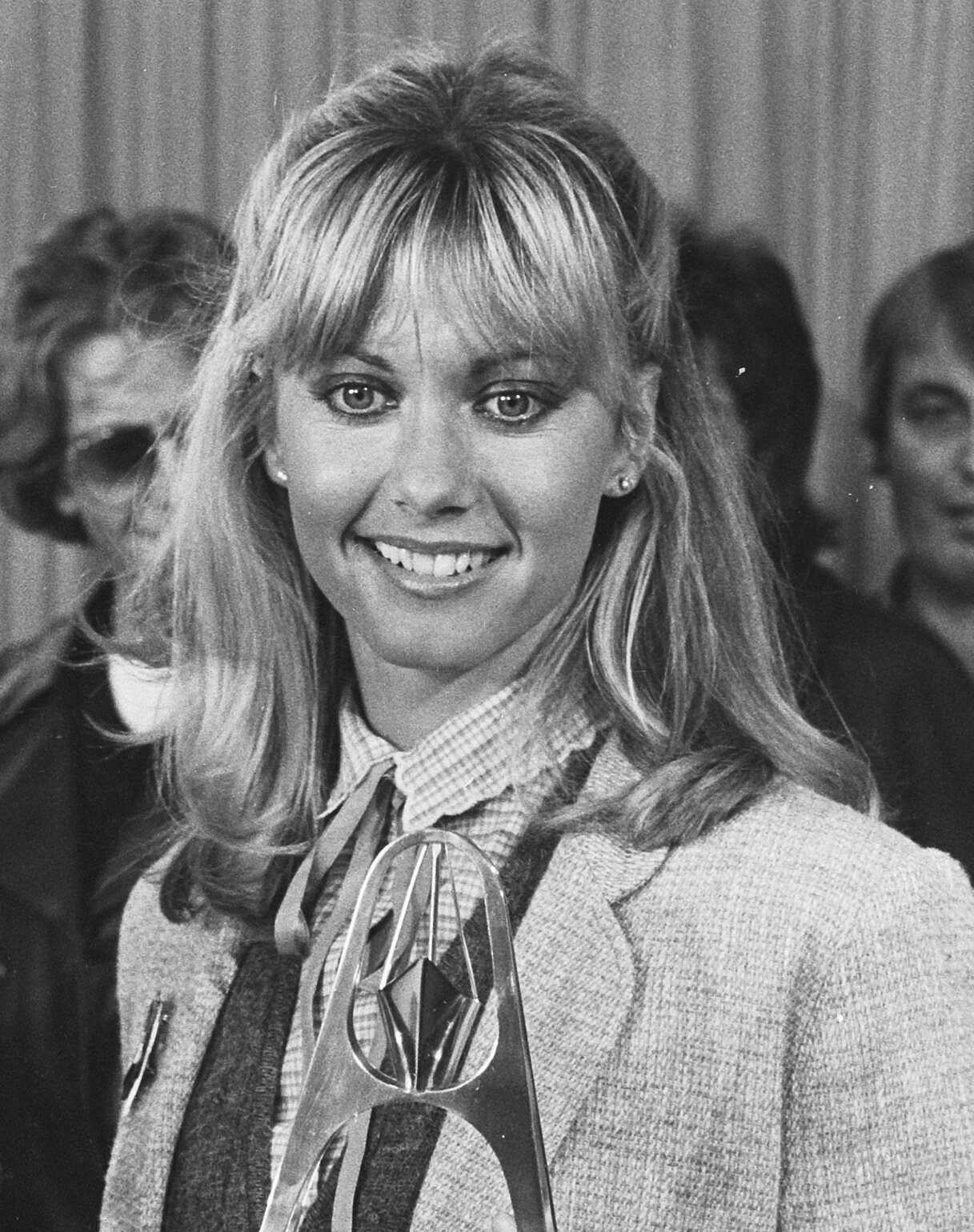
Olivia Newton-John had two songs on the Year-End Hot 100, including "Physical", the number one song of the year.

This is a list of Billboard magazine's Top Hot 100 songs of 1982. The Top 100, as revealed in the year-end edition of Billboard dated December 25, 1982, is based on Hot 100 charts from the issue dates of November 1, 1981 through October 31, 1982.

No.	Title	Artist(s)
1	"Physical"	Olivia Newton-John
2	"Eye of the Tiger"	Survivor
3	"I Love Rock 'n Roll"	Joan Jett & The Blackhearts
4	"Ebony and Ivory"	Paul McCartney and Stevie Wonder
5	"Centerfold"	The J. Geils Band
6	"Don't You Want Me"	The Human League
7	"Jack & Diane"	John Cougar
8	"Hurts So Good"	John Cougar
9	"Abracadabra"	Steve Miller Band
10	"Hard to Say I'm Sorry"	Chicago
11	"Tainted Love"	Soft Cell
12	"Chariots of Fire"	Vangelis
13	"Harden My Heart"	Quarterflash
14	"Rosanna"	Toto
15	"I Can't Go for That (No Can Do)"	Daryl Hall & John Oates
16	"867-5309/Jenny"	Tommy Tutone
17	"Key Largo"	Bertie Higgins
18	"You Should Hear How She Talks About You"	Melissa Manchester
19	"Waiting for a Girl Like You"	Foreigner
20	"Don't Talk to Strangers"	Rick Springfield
21	"The Sweetest Thing (I've Ever Known)"	Juice Newton
22	"Always on My Mind"	Willie Nelson
23	"Shake It Up"	The Cars
24	"Let It Whip"	Dazz Band
25	"We Got the Beat"	The Go-Go's
26	"The Other Woman"	Ray Parker Jr.
27	"Turn Your Love Around"	George Benson
28	"Sweet Dreams"	Air Supply
29	"Only the Lonely"	The Motels
30	"Who Can It Be Now?"	Men at Work
31	"Hold Me"	Fleetwood Mac
32	"Eye in the Sky"	The Alan Parsons Project
33	"Let's Groove"	Earth, Wind & Fire
34	"Open Arms"	Journey
35	"Leader of the Band"	Dan Fogelberg
36	"Leather and Lace"	Stevie Nicks and Don Henley
37	"Even the Nights Are Better"	Air Supply
38	"I've Never Been to Me"	Charlene
39	"'65 Love Affair"	Paul Davis
40	"Heat of the Moment"	Asia
41	"Take It Easy on Me"	Little River Band
42	"Pac-Man Fever"	Buckner & Garcia
43	"That Girl"	Stevie Wonder
44	"Private Eyes"	Daryl Hall & John Oates
45	"Trouble"	Lindsey Buckingham
46	"Making Love"	Roberta Flack
47	"Love's Been a Little Bit Hard on Me"	Juice Newton
48	"Young Turks"	Rod Stewart
49	"Freeze-Frame"	The J. Geils Band
50	"Keep the Fire Burnin'"	REO Speedwagon
51	"Do You Believe in Love"	Huey Lewis and the News
52	"Cool Night"	Paul Davis
53	"Caught Up In You"	.38 Special
54	"Why Do Fools Fall In Love?"	Diana Ross
55	"Love in the First Degree"	Alabama
56	"Hooked On Classics"	Royal Philharmonic Orchestra
57	"Wasted on the Way"	Crosby, Stills & Nash
58	"Think I'm in Love"	Eddie Money
59	"Love Is in Control (Finger on the Trigger)"	Donna Summer
60	"Personally"	Karla Bonoff
61	"One Hundred Ways"	Quincy Jones featuring James Ingram
62	"Blue Eyes"	Elton John
63	"Our Lips Are Sealed"	The Go-Go's
64	"You Could Have Been with Me"	Sheena Easton
65	"You Can Do Magic"	America
66	"Did It in a Minute"	Daryl Hall & John Oates
67	"I Ran (So Far Away)"	A Flock of Seagulls
68	"Somebody's Baby"	Jackson Browne
69	"Oh No"	Commodores
70	"Take It Away"	Paul McCartney
71	"It's Gonna Take a Miracle"	Deniece Williams
72	"Love Will Turn You Around"	Kenny Rogers
73	"Don't Stop Believin'"	Journey
74	"Comin' In and Out of Your Life"	Barbra Streisand
75	"Gloria"	Laura Branigan
76	"Empty Garden (Hey Hey Johnny)"	Elton John
77	"Yesterday's Songs"	Neil Diamond
78	"Crimson and Clover"	Joan Jett & The Blackhearts
79	"Every Little Thing She Does Is Magic"	The Police
80	"Here I Am"	Air Supply
81	"I Keep Forgettin' (Every Time You're Near)"	Michael McDonald
82	"Get Down on It"	Kool & the Gang
83	"Any Day Now"	Ronnie Milsap
84	"Make a Move on Me"	Olivia Newton-John
85	"Take My Heart (You Can Have It If You Want It)"	Kool & the Gang
86	"Mirror Mirror"	Diana Ross
87	"Vacation"	The Go-Go's
88	"(Oh) Pretty Woman"	Van Halen
89	"Should I Do It"	The Pointer Sisters
90	"Hot in the City"	Billy Idol
91	"Kids in America"	Kim Wilde
92	"Man on Your Mind"	Little River Band
93	"What's Forever For"	Michael Murphey
94	"Waiting on a Friend"	The Rolling Stones
95	"Do I Do"	Stevie Wonder
96	"Working for the Weekend"	Loverboy
97	"Goin' Down"	Greg Guidry
98	"Arthur's Theme (Best That You Can Do)"	Christopher Cross
99	"Through the Years"	Kenny Rogers
100	"Edge of Seventeen"	Stevie Nicks

== See also ==
- 1982 in music
- Billboard Year-End Hot Black Singles of 1982
- List of Billboard Hot 100 number-one singles of 1982
- List of Billboard Hot 100 top-ten singles in 1982
