= The Heart of a Woman (album) =

Studio album by Johnny Mathis
- Released: November 25, 1974
- Recorded: June 28, 1974; September 6–7, 1974
- Studios: Larrabee Sound, Los Angeles, California, Devonshire Sound, Los Angeles, California
- Genres: R&B; Vocal pop; pop/rock
- Length: 35:00
- Label: Columbia
- Producers: Johnny Bristol; Jerry Fuller

Johnny Mathis chronology
Johnny Mathis Sings the Great Songs (1974)	The Heart of a Woman (1974)	When Will I See You Again (1975)

The Heart of a Woman is an album by American pop singer Johnny Mathis that was released on November 25, 1974, by Columbia Records. Produced by ex-Motowner Johnny Bristol, the LP is made up mostly of new material, in that only four of the 10 songs had already been recorded by other artists.

The album made its first appearance on Billboard magazine's Top LP's & Tapes chart in the issue dated December 28, 1974, and remained there for seven weeks, peaking at number 139. It also began a two-week run on the UK album chart on April 5, 1975, during which time it made it to number 39.

The only song from the album that ever charted as a single by Mathis was "Sail on White Moon", which entered Billboard's list of the 50 most popular Easy Listening songs in the US in the issue of the magazine dated February 15, 1975, and peaked at number 35 during its five weeks there. However, the title track from the album was used in a commercial for Helena Rubinstein's Courant perfume.

== Reception ==
Professional ratings
Review scores
Source	Rating
Billboard	positive
The Encyclopedia of Popular Music	3/5 stars
Music Week	4/4 stars

Billboard asserted, "With Johnny Bristol handling the production, we may have the most contemporary commercial LP Mathis has come up with in several years."

== Track listing ==
=== Side one ===
1. "Woman, Woman" (Bristol) – 3:16
2. "Sail On White Moon" (Bristol) – 3:12
3. "It's Gone" (Eliot Tucker) – 3:13
4. "House for Sale" (Lawrence Howard Brown, Oleg Lopatin) – 3:18
5. "Feel Like Makin' Love" (Eugene McDaniels) – 3:40

=== Side two ===
1. "Memories Don't Leave like People Do" (Bristol, Jerry Butler, James Anthony Dean, John Henry Glover) – 4:23
2. "Strangers in Dark Corners" (Bristol) – 3:50
3. "Wendy" from Three the Hard Way (Lowrell Simon, Richard Tufo) – 3:36
4. "The Heart of a Woman" (Lee Adams, Charles Strouse) – 2:57
5. "The Way We Planned It" (George Clinton) – 3:35

=== 2017 CD bonus tracks ===
This album's CD release as part of the 2017 box set The Voice of Romance: The Columbia Original Album Collection included two bonus tracks that were previously unavailable:

- "Fifty Fifty" (Jerry Fuller) – 3:22
- "Nothing in This Whole World" (unknown) – 4:14

== Recording dates ==
From the liner notes for The Voice of Romance: The Columbia Original Album Collection:

- May 28–29, 1974 – "Fifty Fifty", "Nothing in This Whole World"
- June 28, 1974 – "Sail On White Moon", "The Way We Planned It"
- September 6–7, 1974 – "Feel Like Makin' Love", "The Heart of a Woman", "House for Sale", "It's Gone", "Memories Don't Leave like People Do", "Strangers in Dark Corners", "Wendy", "Woman, Woman"

== Song information ==
Of the four covers on this album, only "Feel Like Makin' Love" had been released as a single by the original artist. Roberta Flack's recording of the song spent five weeks at number one on Billboard magazine's list of the 100 most popular Soul songs in the US, two weeks at number one on its Easy Listening chart, and a week at the top of the Billboard Hot 100 in addition to receiving Gold certification from the Recording Industry Association of America. "Sail On White Moon" was first recorded by Boz Scaggs for his 1974 album Slow Dancer, and "Wendy" was originally performed by The Impressions on the soundtrack of the 1974 film Three the Hard Way. "The Way We Planned It" was first recorded by The Friends of Distinction on their 1973 studio album Love Can Make It Easier.

== Personnel ==
From the liner notes of the original album:

Production

- Johnny Bristol – producer (except as noted)
- Jerry Fuller – producer ("The Way We Planned It")
- Paul Riser – arranger (except as noted)
- H. B. Barnum – arranger ("The Way We Planned It")
- James C. Barnett – arranger ("Feel Like Makin' Love", "The Heart of a Woman")
- Greg Venable – engineer, mixer
- Richard Avedon – photographer
- John Berg – cover design

Performers

- Michael Anthony – guitar
- Reginald Burke – keyboards
- Joe L. Clayton – percussion
- Dennis Coffey – guitar
- Henry E. Davis – bass
- Gene Estes – percussion
- Edward Greene – drums
- Johnny Mathis – vocals
- Ray E. Parker Jr. – guitar
- Melvin M. Ragin – guitar
- Henry Wallace Shead – keyboards
- Franzel Venable – vocal harmony ("Feel like Makin' Love")

== Bibliography ==
- Whitburn, Joel (2004), Joel Whitburn Presents Top R&B/Hip-Hop Singles, 1942-2004, Record Research Inc., ISBN 0-89820-160-8
- Whitburn, Joel (2007), Joel Whitburn Presents Billboard Top Adult Songs, 1961-2006, Record Research Inc., ISBN 978-0898201697
- Whitburn, Joel (2009), Joel Whitburn's Top Pop Singles, 1955-2008, Record Research Inc., ISBN 978-0-89820-180-2
- Whitburn, Joel (2010), Joel Whitburn Presents Top Pop Albums, Seventh Edition, Record Research Inc., ISBN 978-0-89820-183-3
