= Grazin' =

Studio album by The Friends of Distinction
- Released: 1969
- Studio: RCA's Music Center of the World (Hollywood, California)
- Genre: Soul
- Label: RCA Victor
- Producer: John Florez

The Friends of Distinction chronology
Grazin' (1969)	Highly Distinct (1969)

Professional ratings
Review scores
Source	Rating
AllMusic	4/5 stars
The Rolling Stone Album Guide	1.5/5 stars

Grazin' is the debut studio album by music group The Friends of Distinction, released in 1969 on RCA Victor.

== Commercial performance ==
The album peaked at No. 10 on the R&B albums chart. It also reached No. 35 on the Billboard 200. The album features the single, "Grazing in the Grass", which peaked at No. 3 on the Billboard Hot 100 and No. 5 on the Hot Soul Singles chart. A second single, "Going in Circles" also charted at No. 15 on the Billboard Hot 100 and No. 3 on the Hot Soul Singles chart.

== Track listing ==
Side one
No.	Title	Writer(s)	Length
1.	"Grazing in the Grass"	Philemon Hou, Harry Elston	2:58
2.	"I've Never Found a Girl (To Love Me Like You Do)"	Booker T. Jones, Eddie Floyd, Alvertis Isbell	3:34
3.	"I Really Hope You Do"	Anita Poree, Jerry Peters	4:00
4.	"(A) Sweet Young Thing Like You"	Big Dee Irwin	3:08
5.	"Going in Circles"	Anita Poree, Jerry Peters	4:28

Side two
No.	Title	Writer(s)	Length
6.	"Eli's Comin"	Laura Nyro	4:19
7.	"Help Yourself (To All of My Lovin')"	Scott English, Mark Barkan, Jerry Ross	2:07
8.	"Baby I Could Be So Good at Loving You"	Buzz Clifford	3:09
9.	"And I Love Him"	John Lennon, Paul McCartney	4:17
10.	"Peaceful"	Kenny Rankin	3:32
11.	"Lonesome Mood"	Roy Porter	4:48

== Personnel ==
- Ray Cork Jr. - arrangements, conductor
- Floyd Butler, Harry Elston, Jessica Cleaves, Barbara Jean Love – vocals
- Al Casey – guitar
- Arthur G. Wright – guitar
- Max Bennett – electric bass
- Jim Gordon – drums, percussion
- King Errison – congas
- Jack Arnold – percussion
- John Audino – trumpet, flugelhorn
- Buddy Childers – trumpet, flugelhorn
- Dalton Smith – trumpet, flugelhorn
- Bill Peterson – trumpet, flugelhorn
- Bud Brisbois – trumpet
- Tony Terran – trumpet
- David Duke – French horn
- Dick Leith – trombone
- Plas Johnson – flute, clarinet
- Jim Horn – flute, tenor saxophone
- William Green – flute, piccolo
- Gene Cipriano – flute, oboe, English horn, piccolo
- Brad Bauder – tenor saxophone, clarinet
- Jimmy Getzoff – violin
- Harry Bluestone – violin
- Paul Shure – violin
- Garry Nuttycombe – viola
- Douglas Davis – cello
- Catherine Gotthoffer – harp

== Charts ==
Album

Chart (1969)	Peak
U.S. Billboard Top LPs	35
U.S. Billboard Top Soul LPs	10

Singles

Year	Single	Peaks	
Year	Single	US	US R&B
1969	"Grazing in the Grass"	3	5
1969	"Going in Circles"	15	3
