= Friends & People =

Studio album by The Friends of Distinction
- Released: 1971
- Studio: RCA's Music Center of the World (Hollywood, California)
- Genre: Soul
- Label: RCA Victor
- Producer: Jerry Peters, Ray Cork, Jr.

The Friends of Distinction chronology
Whatever (1970)	Friends & People (1971)	Love Can Make It Easier (1973)

Friends & People is the fifth studio album by R&B group The Friends of Distinction, released in 1971 on the RCA Victor label.

== Commercial performance ==
The album peaked at No. 166 on the Billboard 200 chart. The album features the single "I Need You", which peaked at #28 on the Hot Soul Singles chart and No. 79 on the Billboard Hot 100.

== Track listing ==
Side one
No.	Title	Writer(s)	Length
1.	"People"	Jule Styne, Bob Merrill	11:30
2.	"Faces on the Bus"	Anita Poree, Jerry Peters	5:20
3.	"I Can't Get You Out of My Mind"	Jerry Peters, Skip Scarborough	3:30
4.	"Down I Go"	Floyd Butler, Jerry Peters	3:10
5.	"Dying to Live"	Edgar Winter	4:15

Side two
No.	Title	Writer(s)	Length
6.	"Oh, How I Miss You"	Jerry Peters	9:23
7.	"Jenny Wants to Know"	Jerry Peters	2:52
8.	"Let Me Be"	Skip Scarborough	2:49
9.	"I Need You"	Jerry Peters	3:12
10.	"It's Time to See Each Other"	Jerry Peters	11:12

== Personnel ==
- Harry Eltson, Floyd Butler, Jessica Cleaves – vocals

== Charts ==
Chart (1971)	Peak
U.S. Billboard Top LPs	166

Singles

Year	Single	Peak	
Year	Single	US	US R&B
1971	"I Need You"	79	28
