= No Sugar Tonight/New Mother Nature =

Single by The Guess Who

from the album American Woman
- A-side: "American Woman"
- Released: March 1970
- Recorded: 1969
- Studio: RCA Mid-America Recording Center, Studio B, Chicago
- Genre: Blues rock, psychedelic rock
- Length: 4:52 (album version with "New Mother Nature"); 2:04 (single w/o "New Mother Nature")
- Label: RCA Victor
- Songwriters: Burton Cummings; Randy Bachman
- Producer: Jack Richardson

The Guess Who singles chronology
"No Time" (1969)	"No Sugar Tonight/New Mother Nature" (1970)	"Hand Me Down World" (1970)

"No Sugar Tonight/New Mother Nature" is a medley by the Canadian rock band The Guess Who. It was released on their 1970 album American Woman, and was released on the B-side of the "American Woman" single without the "New Mother Nature" section. (Note: A spoken reference to "New Mother Nature" can still be heard in the fadeout, as on the album version.) The single was officially released as "American Woman/No Sugar Tonight" and peaked at #1 on the RPM magazine charts and #1 on the Billboard Hot 100, for three weeks on both charts. In Cash Box, which at the time ranked sides of singles independently, "No Sugar Tonight" reached #39.

According to Randy Bachman, the inspiration for the song arose after an incident when he was visiting California. He was walking down the street with a stack of records under his arm, when he saw three "tough-looking biker guys" approaching. He felt threatened and was looking for a way to cross the street onto the other sidewalk when a little car pulled up to the men. A woman about 5 feet (150 cm) tall got out of the car, shouting at one of them, asking where he'd been all day, that he had left her alone with the kids, didn't take out the trash, and was down here watching the girls. The man was suddenly alone when his buddies walked away. Chastened, he got in the car as the woman told him before pulling away: "And one more thing, you ain't getting no sugar tonight". The words stuck in Bachman's memory.

Bachman then wrote a short song in the key of F♯ called "No Sugar Tonight". When he presented the song to Burton Cummings and RCA, he was told that the song was too short. Bachman and Cummings expanded the song by adding to it a song Cummings had written that was also in the key of F♯, "New Mother Nature".

== Cover versions ==
"No Sugar Tonight" was covered by The Shirelles on their Happy and in Love album released in 1971, and by Bang on their Mother/Bow to the King album (Capitol Records, SMAS-11110) released in 1972. Capitol subsequently released the song as a single (cat# 3474), but it failed to chart. Widespread Panic included covers of the song on their live albums Live at The Classic Center and Live at The Tabernacle.

"New Mother Nature" was covered by The Friends of Distinction on their Whatever LP released in 1970. It was used as the B-side of their hit, "Time Waits for No One" (US #60, Canada #37).

Reggae singer Nicky Thomas released a cover version under the title "Lonely Feelin'" on his 1970 album 'Love of the Common People'.

== Certifications ==
Certifications for "No Sugar Tonight"
Region	Certification	Certified units/sales
Canada (Music Canada)	Gold	40,000^{‡}
^{‡} Sales+streaming figures based on certification alone.
