= Real Friends =

Real Friends may refer to:

- Real Friends (band), an American band
- Real Friends (The Friends of Distinction album), a 1970 album by The Friends of Distinction
- Real Friends (Chris Janson album), a 2019 album by Chris Janson
- "Real Friends" (Kanye West song), a 2016 song by Kanye West
- "Real Friends" (Camila Cabello song), 2017
- ""Real Friends" (XO song), 2025
