= Love Can Make It Easier =

Studio album by The Friends of Distinction
- Released: 1973
- Recorded: 1973
- Studio: RCA's Music Center of the World (Hollywood, California)
- Genre: Soul
- Label: RCA Victor
- Producer: The Friends of Distinction, Ray Cork, Jr.

The Friends of Distinction chronology
| Friends & People (1971) | Love Can Make It Easier (1973) | Reviviscence: Live to Light Again (1975) |

Singles from Love Can Make It Easier
- 1. "The Way We Planned It" Released: 1972; 2. "Thumb Tripping (I'll Be Movin' On)" Released: 1972; 3. "Easy Evil" Released: 1973; 4. "Love Can Make It Easier" Released: 1973

Love Can Make It Easier is the sixth studio album by R&B group The Friends of Distinction, released in 1973 on the RCA Victor label. Neither this album nor its singles charted.

== Track listing ==
Side A
| No. | Title | Writer(s) | Length |
|---|---|---|---|
| 1. | "Love Can Make It Easier" | Skip Scarborough | 4:39 |
| 2. | "No One's Gonna Be A Fool Forever" | Michael Masser, Pam Sawyer | 3:13 |
| 3. | "Now Is The Time" | Ernie Shelby | 3:42 |
| 4. | "Believe In Me" | Adele Sebastian, Larry Farrow | 4:19 |
| 5. | "You're Gonna Make It" | Skip Scarborough | 3:34 |
| 6. | "The Chittlin' Song" | Anita Poree, Skip Scarborough | 3:52 |

Side B
| No. | Title | Writer(s) | Length |
|---|---|---|---|
| 7. | "Ain't No Woman (Like The One I've Got)" | Brian Potter, Dennis Lambert | 3:33 |
| 8. | "The Way We Planned It" | George Clinton | 4:21 |
| 9. | "Thumb Trippin' (I'll Be Movin' On)" | Floyd Butler, Harry Elston, Ray Cork, Jr., Stephanie Black | 3:40 |
| 10. | "Easy Evil" | Alan O'Day | 3:50 |
| 11. | "Only Give Love" | Jerry Peters | 4:34 |

== Personnel ==
- Harry Elston, Floyd Butler, Diane Jackson, Dani McCormick - vocals
