= Time Waits for No One (Neil Sedaka song) =

Single by The Friends of Distinction

from the album Whatever
- B-side: "New Mother Nature"
- Released: October 1970
- Recorded: 1970
- Genre: Pop, R&B
- Length: 2:49
- Label: RCA Victor 74-0385
- Songwriters: Neil Sedaka, Howard Greenfield

The Friends of Distinction singles chronology
"Love or Let Me Be Lonely" (1970)	"Time Waits for No One" (1970)	"I Need You" (1971)

"Time Waits for No One" is a song written by Neil Sedaka and Howard Greenfield, and originally recorded by Sedaka in 1970.

== Friends of Distinction cover ==
The song was covered by The Friends of Distinction in 1970 on their Whatever LP. The group made "Time Waits for No One" into a hit in the United States (#60), Canada (#37) and New Zealand (#18).

=== Chart history ===
Chart (1970–71)	Peak position
Canada RPM Top Singles	37
New Zealand (Listener)	18
U.S. Billboard Hot 100	60
U.S. Billboard R&B	37
U.S. Cash Box Top 100	44
