= Sweet Life =

Sweet Life may refer to:

- Sweet Life (album), a 1999 album by Renée Geyer
- "Sweet Life" (Paul Davis song), a 1978 song by Paul Davis
- "Sweet Life" (Frank Ocean song), a 2012 song by Frank Ocean
- "Sweet Life (La vie est belle)", a 2013 song by Fally Ipupa
- Sweet Life: Los Angeles, a 2021 HBO Max reality TV series, created by Issa Rae
- "Sweet Life", a song by Barry Manilow from the 1973 album Barry Manilow, first recorded in 1972 by Punch
- "Sweet Life", a song by Jeezy from the 2015 album Church in These Streets
- "Sweet Life", a song by !!! from the 2007 album Myth Takes

== See also ==
- The Sweet Life (disambiguation)
