= I Only Wanted You =

Studio album by Marie Osmond
- Released: August 1986
- Recorded: January–March 1986
- Studio: Treasure Isle Recorders
- Genres: Country; country pop
- Length: 37:54
- Labels: Capitol; Curb
- Producer: Paul Worley

Marie Osmond chronology
There's No Stopping Your Heart (1985)	I Only Wanted You (1986)	All in Love (1988)

Singles from I Only Wanted You
- 1. "You're Still New to Me" Released: July 1986; 2. "I Only Wanted You" Released: December 1986; 3. "Everybody's Crazy 'Bout My Baby" Released: April 1987; 4. "Cry Just a Little" Released: July 1987

I Only Wanted You is a studio album by American singer Marie Osmond. It was released by the Capitol and Curb record labels in August 1986. The album was a collection of ten tracks recorded in a country pop production. Included was a duet with Paul Davis titled "You're Still New to Me", which became a chart-topping country single. Three additional singles were part of the album: the title track, "Everybody's Crazy 'Bout My Baby" and "Cry Just a Little". The album itself reached the top 20 of the US country chart. It was given positive reviews from critics.

== Background, recording and content ==
The only sister in the Osmond entertainment family, Marie Osmond established her own identity as a country recording artist while still a teenager. In 1973, her debut single "Paper Roses" became a commercial success. She later branched into film and television but returned to the country industry in the 1980s. Jim Foglesong of Capitol Records signed her to a new recording contract, along with doing the same for Tanya Tucker. Foglesong would be credited to reviving both their solo careers.

Osmond's second album with the label was 1986's I Only Wanted You. The project was recorded in sessions held between January and March 1986 at Treasure Isle Recorders in Nashville, Tennessee. Like her previous album project, it was produced by Paul Worley. The album contained a total of ten tracks and had a country pop production. Two tracks were penned by Paul Davis: "Cry Just a Little" and "You're Still New to Me". The latter was a duet between Osmond and Davis. Compared to her previous release, I Only Wanted You featured more uptempo tracks. Among them was the song "Everybody's Crazy 'Bout My Baby", which was considered a "fan favorite".

== Release and critical reception ==
Professional ratings
Review scores
Source	Rating
Allmusic	4/5 stars

I Only Wanted You was originally released in August 1986 in a joint venture between the Capitol and Curb record labels. It was distributed in three formats: a vinyl LP, a cassette and a compact disc. All three formats had identical track listings. It would later be re-released in a digital formats to retailers such as Apple Music. The project received positive reviews from critics following its release. Billboard named it among its "Country Picks" in September 1986. The magazine called its country pop sound "glowing", and concluded, "As close as Nashville comes to pure aural delight". Charlotte Dillon of AllMusic gave the album four out of five stars. "All in all, this is a pleasing mix of tunes and a really nice Marie Osmond recording to add to any country music collection," she concluded.

== Chart performance and singles ==
I Only Wanted You entered the US Top Country Albums chart on September 27, 1986, and spent a total of 37 weeks on the chart. One month later, it peaked at the number 19 position. It was Osmond's second-longest running album on the country chart. A total of four singles were included on the album. Its first was the Davis-Osmond duet "You're Still New to Me". Capitol first issued the single in July 1986. It became her fourth number one single on the US Hot Country Songs chart and her third on the Canadian RPM Country Tracks chart.

The title track was the album's second single and was issued in December 1986. It reached number 14 on the US country chart and number 19 on the Canadian country chart. In April 1987, "Everybody's Crazy 'Bout My Baby" was issued as the album's third single. It went to the number 24 position on the US country chart and number 34 on the Canadian country chart. Its fourth and final single was "Cry Just a Little" (released in July 1987). On the US country singles chart, it reached number 50.

== Track listing ==
I Only Wanted You (LP, CD, cassette and digital)
No.	Title	Writer(s)	Length
1.	"Cry Just a Little"	Paul Davis	3:32
2.	"I Only Wanted You"	Michael Garvin; Bucky Jones; Tom Shapiro	3:22
3.	"You're Still New to Me" (with Paul Davis)	Davis; Paul Overstreet	3:20
4.	"Making Magic"	Rory Bourke; Thomas Campbell	3:10
5.	"I Know the Feeling"	J. Fred Knobloch; Dan Tyler	3:27
6.	"Your Love Carries Me Away"	Kathie Baillie; Craig Bickhardt; Michael Bonagura	3:29
7.	"We're Gonna Need a Love Song"	J. Fred Knobloch; Wood Newton	2:56
8.	"New Love"	David Erwin; Herb McCullough	3:20
9.	"More Than Dancing"	Larry Boone; Paul Nelson	4:03
10.	"Everybody's Crazy 'Bout My Baby"	Mike Reid	3:41

== Personnel ==
All credits are adapted from the liner notes of I Only Wanted You.

Musical personnel

- Kathie Baillie – background vocals
- Eddie Bayers – drums
- Jessica Boucher – background vocals
- Michael Brooks – background vocals
- Dennis Burnside – piano, string arrangements
- Larry Byrom – acoustic guitar
- Terry Choate – steel guitar
- Paul Davis – lead vocals and background vocals on "You're Still New to Me"
- Thomas Flora – background vocals
- Steve Gibson – electric guitar
- Jim Horn – saxophone
- Dave Innis – synthesizer
- Mike Lawler – synthesizer
- Alan LeBeouf – background vocals
- Kenny Mims – electric guitar
- Marie Osmond – lead vocals
- Michael Rhodes – bass guitar
- Tom Robb – bass guitar
- Lisa Silver – background vocals
- James Stroud – drums
- Diane Tidwell – background vocals
- Dennis Wilson – background vocals
- Paul Worley – acoustic guitar, electric guitar, background vocals

Technical personnel

- Charles Bush – photography
- Thomas Durr – mixing
- Tom Harding – mixing, mixing assistant
- Hollis Halford – engineer
- Roy Kohara – art direction
- Marshall Morgan – engineer
- Tom Roady – percussion
- Ed Seay – mixing
- Bob Wright – engineer
- Paul Worley – producer

== Chart performance ==
=== Weekly charts ===
Chart (1986–1987)	Peak position
US Top Country Albums (Billboard)	19

== Release history ==
Region	Date	Format	Label	Ref.
Japan	August 1986	Vinyl LP	Capitol Records	
North America	August 1986	Cassette; vinyl LP; compact disc	Capitol Records; Curb Records	
United Kingdom	August 1986	Vinyl LP	Capitol Records	
North America	circa 2020	Music download; streaming	Curb Records	
