= Highly Distinct =

Studio album by The Friends of Distinction
- Released: September 1969
- Studio: RCA (Hollywood, California)
- Genre: Soul
- Label: RCA Victor
- Producer: John Florez

The Friends of Distinction chronology
Grazin' (1969)	Highly Distinct (1969)	Real Friends (1970)

Professional ratings
Review scores
Source	Rating
AllMusic	3/5 stars

Highly Distinct is the second studio album by R&B group The Friends of Distinction, released in September 1969 on the RCA Victor label. The album reached No. 14 on the Billboard Top Soul Albums chart.

== Covers ==
On this album The Friends of Distinction covered The Doors' "Light My Fire".

== Track listing ==
Side one
No.	Title	Writer(s)	Length
1.	"Impressions"		1:50
2.	"It's Just a Game Love"	Quincy Jones, Ernie Shelby	2:35
3.	"We Got a Good Thing Goin'"	Willie Hutchison	3:20
4.	"Workin' On a Groovy Thing"	Neil Sedaka, Roger Atkins	4:05
5.	"It's a Wonderful World"	Arthur Reynolds	2:15

Side two
No.	Title	Writer(s)	Length
6.	"It's Sunday"	Les Baxter	4:00
7.	"Why Did I Lose You"	Carl D'Errico, Roger Atkins	2:59
8.	"Light My Fire"	Jim Morrison, Ray Manzarek, Robby Krieger, John Densmore	2:24
9.	"This Generation"	Joseph Peay	4:28
10.	"Let Yourself Go"	Willie Hutchison	2:34

== Personnel ==
- Harry Elston, Floyd Butler, Jessica Cleaves, Barbara Jean Love – vocals

== Charts ==
Album

Year	Chart	Peak
1969	U.S. Billboard Top LPs	173
1969	U.S. Billboard Top Soul LPs	14

Singles

Year	Single	Peak
Year	Single	US
1969	"Let Yourself Go"	63
