= When Will I See You Again (disambiguation) =

"When Will I See You Again" is a 1974 song by American soul group the Three Degrees.

When Will I See You Again may also refer to:

- When Will I See You Again (Johnny Mathis album), 1975
- When Will I See You Again (Thomas Anders album), 1993
- When Will I See You Again, a 1983 album by the O'Jays

== See also ==
- "When Can I See You Again?", a song by Owl City
- "When Can I See You", a song by Babyface
