= Whatever (The Friends of Distinction album) =

Studio album by The Friends of Distinction
- Released: 1970
- Studio: RCA's Music Center of the World (Hollywood, California)
- Genre: Soul
- Length: 46:45
- Label: RCA Victor
- Producer: Ray Cork, Jr.

The Friends of Distinction chronology
| Real Friends (1970) | Whatever (1970) | Friends & People (1971) |

Whatever is the fourth studio album by R&B group The Friends of Distinction, released in 1970 on the RCA Victor label.

== Commercial performance ==
The album peaked at No. 42 on the R&B albums chart. It also reached No. 179 on the Billboard 200. The album features the single, "Time Waits for No One", which peaked at No. 60 on the Billboard Hot 100 and No. 37 on the Hot Soul Singles chart.

== Track listing ==
Side one
| No. | Title | Writer(s) | Length |
|---|---|---|---|
| 1. | "You and I" | Greg Poree, Jerry Peters | 5:05 |
| 2. | "New Mother Nature" | Burton Cummings | 3:41 |
| 3. | "Soulful Anthem" | David Bryant | 7:17 |
| 4. | "Time Waits for No One" | Neil Sedaka, Howard Greenfield | 3:20 |
| 5. | "People Talkin' and Sayin' Nothin'" | Wilma Classon, Ken Williams | 5:53 |

Side two
| No. | Title | Writer(s) | Length |
|---|---|---|---|
| 6. | "Check It Out" | Floyd Butler, Billy Osborne | 2:58 |
| 7. | "Didn't We" | Jimmy Webb | 5:37 |
| 8. | "Great Day" | Barbara Love, Terry Evans | 3:41 |
| 9. | "Willa Faye" | Greg Poree, Jerry Peters | 4:37 |
| 10. | "Bring Us a Better Day" | John Hurley, Ronnie Wilkins | 3:43 |

== Personnel ==
- Floyd Butler, Barbara Jean Love, Charlene Gibson, Harry Elston – vocals
- Jerry Peters, Joe Sample – keyboards
- Ray Cork, Jr. – keyboards, percussion, trumpet
- Louie Shelton, Greg Poree, David T. Walker – guitar
- Wilton Felder – electric bass
- Gary Coleman, Kenneth Watson – percussion
- King Errison – congas
- Toxey French, Edward Greene – drums
- Jimmy Getzoff – violin, concertmaster
- Nathan Ross – violin
- Samuel Boghossian – viola
- Armand Kaproff – cello
- Plas Johnson, William Green – woodwinds
- Jay Migliori – baritone saxophone
- Paul Hubinon, John Audino – trumpet, flugelhorn
- Richard Nash – trombone, baritone horn

== Charts ==
Album

| Chart (1970) | Peak |
|---|---|
| U.S. Billboard Top LPs | 179 |
| U.S. Billboard Top Soul LPs | 42 |

Singles

| Year | Single | Peaks | |
| Year | Single | US | US R&B |
|---|---|---|---|
| 1970 | "Time Waits for No One" | 60 | 37 |
