= Do Right (Paul Davis song) =

Single by Paul Davis

from the album Paul Davis
- B-side: "He Sang Our Love Songs"
- Released: March 1980
- Recorded: 1979
- Genre: Easy listening
- Length: 4:05
- Label: Bang
- Songwriter(s): Paul Davis
- Producer(s): Paul Davis, Ed Seay

Paul Davis singles chronology
"Sweet Life" (1978)	"Do Right" (1980)	"Cry Just a Little" (1980)

"Do Right" is a 1980 hit song by Paul Davis from the album Paul Davis. The song was one of several gospel-tinged songs to hit the US pop charts by 1980, peaking at No. 23 on the Hot 100 and No. 4 on the Adult Contemporary chart. The song became the 10th biggest Christian adult contemporary hit of 1980. The song reached #64 in Canada.

Terry McMillan covered the song in 1997 with a guest performance from Davis. There are also gospel tinged cover versions from Take 6 and 4Him.
