= Goin' Down (Greg Guidry song) =

Single by Greg Guidry

from the album Over the Line
- B-side: "Darlin' It's You"
- Released: January 1982
- Genre: Soft rock
- Length: 3:45
- Label: Columbia
- Songwriters: Greg Guidry, David Martin
- Producers: Greg Guidry, John Ryan

Greg Guidry singles chronology
"Goin' Down" (1982)	"Into My Love" (1982)

"Goin' Down" is a soft rock song written by Greg Guidry and David Martin and performed by Guidry. It reached No. 11 on the U.S. adult contemporary chart and No. 17 on the Billboard Hot 100 in 1982. The song was featured on his 1982 album, Over the Line.

The song was produced by Guidry and John Ryan and released on Columbia Records.

== Charts ==
Year-end chart (1982)	Rank
US Top Pop Singles (Billboard)	97
