= Cool Night (song) =

Single by Paul Davis

from the album Cool Night
- B-side: "One More Time for the Lonely"
- Released: 1981
- Recorded: 1981
- Length: 3:40
- Label: Arista
- Songwriter(s): Paul Davis
- Producer(s): Ed Seay and Paul Davis

Paul Davis singles chronology
"Cry Just a Little"	"Cool Night" (1981)	"'65 Love Affair" (1982)

"Cool Night" is a song by Paul Davis released as a single in 1981 from the album Cool Night. The single peaked at No. 11 on the U.S. Billboard Hot 100 on the week of February 6, 1982, and reached No. 2 on the Adult Contemporary chart in January 1982.

== Chart performance ==
Chart (1981)	Peak position
U.S. Billboard Adult Contemporary	2
US Billboard Hot 100	11

Year-end chart (1982)	Rank
US Top Pop Singles (Billboard)	52

== Cover versions ==
- A cover version of the song was released in 1996 by Joseph Williams (of Toto), on his solo album I Am Alive.
