= Johnny Mathis Sings the Great Songs =

Compilation album by Johnny Mathis
- Released: September 13, 1974
- Recorded: 1959–1972
- Genre: Vocal
- Label: CBS

Johnny Mathis chronology
I'm Coming Home (1973)	Johnny Mathis Sings the Great Songs (1974)	The Heart of a Woman (1974)

Johnny Mathis Sings the Great Songs is a compilation album by American pop singer Johnny Mathis that was released in the UK by CBS Records on September 13, 1974.

On July 1, 1975, the British Phonographic Industry awarded the collection with Silver certification for sales of 60,000 units in the UK.

== Track listing ==
=== Side one ===
1. Professional ratings
  Review scores
  Source	Rating
  The Encyclopedia of Popular Music	3/5 stars
  "Alfie" from Alfie (Burt Bacharach, Hal David) – 3:15
2. "Little Green Apples" (Bobby Russell) – 3:38
3. "Alone Again (Naturally)" (Gilbert O'Sullivan) – 4:20
4. "Rose Garden" (Joe South) – 2:51
5. "Stranger in Paradise" from Kismet (Bob Forrest, Robert Wright) – 4:06
6. "Aquarius/Let the Sunshine In" from Hair (Galt MacDermot, Gerome Ragni) – 3:04

=== Side two ===
1. "Strangers in the Night" (Bert Kaempfert, Charles Singleton, Eddie Snyder) – 3:34
2. "My Sweet Lord" (George Harrison) – 3:16
3. "Everything Is Beautiful" (Ray Stevens) – 3:28
4. "Somewhere My Love" (Maurice Jarre, Paul Francis Webster) – 3:30
5. "Long Ago and Far Away" (James Taylor) – 3:11
6. "Those Were the Days" (Gene Raskin) – 3:59

=== Side three ===
1. "By the Time I Get to Phoenix" (Jimmy Webb) - 3:18
2. "Eleanor Rigby" (John Lennon, Paul McCartney) – 2:55
3. "(They Long to Be) Close to You" (Bacharach, David) – 3:26
4. "I'll Never Fall in Love Again" from Promises, Promises (Bacharach, David) – 3:02
5. "The Very Thought of You" (Ray Noble) – 3:49
6. "Make It Easy on Yourself" (Bacharach, David) – 3:29

=== Side four ===
1. "Bridge over Troubled Water" (Paul Simon, Art Garfunkel) – 4:37
2. "It's Impossible" (Armando Manzanero, Sid Wayne) – 3:00
3. "Too Young" (Sylvia Dee, Sidney Lippman) – 3:16
4. "Go Away Little Girl" (Gerry Goffin, Carole King) – 3:19
5. "Moonlight Becomes You" from Road to Morocco (Johnny Burke, Jimmy Van Heusen) – 4:06
6. "Walk On By" (Bacharach, David) - 3:03
