= Live at The Classic Center =

Live at the Classic Center

Video by Widespread Panic
- Released: February 11, 2011
- Recorded: February 10 & 11, 2011
- Label: Widespread Records

Live at the Classic Center is a live DVD by American rock group Widespread Panic. The album and accompanying film were recorded at the Classic Center in the band's hometown of Athens, Georgia on February 10 and February 11, 2011, on the occasion of the band's 25th anniversary.

== Track listing ==
=== February 10, 2011 ===
==== Disc One ====
1. For What It's Worth
2. Sleepy Monkey
3. Chilly Water
4. Saint Ex
5. One Arm Steve
6. Mr. Soul
7. You'll Be Fine
8. This Cruel Thing
9. Holden Oversoul
10. Contentment Blues
11. Bowlegged Woman

==== Disc Two ====
1. Pigeons
2. Jack
3. Proving Ground
4. Going Out West
5. Arleen
6. Drums
7. Fire on the Mountain
8. Space Wrangler
9. Coconuts
10. Knocking Round the Zoo
11. Greta
12. Heaven

=== February 11, 2011 ===
==== Disc One ====
1. "No Sugar Tonight/New Mother Nature"
2. "Tall Boy"
3. "Red Hot Mam"
4. "Machine"
5. "Barstools and Dreamers"
6. "Can't Get High"
7. "Henry Parsons Died"
8. "This Part of Town"
9. "Nights in White Satin"
10. "Love Tractor"

==== Disc Two ====
1. "Worry"
2. "Imitation Leather Shoes"
3. "Blue Indian"
4. "Blight"
5. "You Got Yours"
6. "Impossible"
7. "New Speedway Boogie"
8. "Fishwater"
9. "Conrad"
10. "Don't Be Denied"
11. "Postcard"
12. "Driving Song"
13. "Porch Song"

== Personnel ==
- John Bell
- John "JoJo" Hermann
- Jimmy Herring
- Todd Nance
- Domingo S. Ortiz
- David Schools
- John Keane - Sitting in on pedal steel for "You'll Be Fine" and sitting in on guitar for "This Cruel Thing"
- Anne Richmond Boston - Sitting in on vocals for "You'll Be Fine"
- Randall Bramblett - Sitting in on the Sax for "Going Out West", "Arleen", and "Jam"
