= Blueprint for Discovery =

Studio album by Jerry Peters
- Released: 1972
- Recorded: June 1972
- Studio: Sound Factory West, Los Angeles, CA, Overdubbed Strings RCA Recording Studios, Los Angeles, CA
- Genre: Soul, Funk
- Label: Mercury
- Producer: Jerry Peters, Keg Johnson, Richard Aaron

Blueprint for Discovery is the only album recorded by producer and arranger Jerry Peters. It was released in 1972 and co-produced by Peters, Keg Johnson and Richard Aaron for Organic Sound Productions.

== Track listing ==
All tracks composed by Jerry Peters; except where indicated.

1. "If You Leave Me Now (Prologue)" 1:26
2. "If You Leave Me Now" 4:23
3. "Long Before You and I" 4:12
4. "Did I Step On Your Heart" 3:06
5. "Going In Circles" (Jerry Peters, Anita Poree) 8:14
6. "Love Song" (Lesley Duncan) 5:30
7. "White Shutters" 4:33
8. "Kuri Monga Nuie (Big Black Dog)" (B. Cole) 5:37
9. "Lest We Forget" 6:52

== Personnel ==
- Jerry Peters - vocals, keyboards, arrangements
- Harvey Mason - drums, percussion
- Wayne Douglas - bass
- Dean Parks - guitar
- Arthur Adams - guitar
- Joseph Porcaro - drums, percussion
- Bobbye Hall - conga
- Mike G. Altschul - saxophone
- Larry McGuire - trumpet, flugelhorn
- Ernie Watts - tenor saxophone, soprano saxophone
- David N. Crawford - flute, alto flute
- Stephanie Spruill, Patrice Holloway, Venetta Fields, Maxine Willard Waters, Jessica Shux, Annesther Shux, Brandy Shux, Dianna Shux, Maria Shux - background vocals
- Janice A. Gower - violin
- Charles Veal, Jr. - violin
- Rollice Dale - viola
- Ronald Cooper - cello
