= Grazing in the Grass =

1968 composition by Philemon Hou

Single by Hugh Masekela

from the album The Promise of a Future
- B-side: "Bajabula Bonke (Healing Song)"
- Released: May 1968
- Recorded: March 12, 1968
- Genre: Jazz
- Length: 2:40
- Label: Uni (55066)
- Songwriter: Philemon Hou
- Producer: Stewart Levine

Hugh Masekela singles chronology
"There Are Seeds to Sow" (1968)	"Grazing in the Grass" (1968)	"Puffin' on Down the Track" (1968)

Music video
- "Grazing in the Grass" on YouTube

"Grazing in the Grass" is an instrumental composed by Philemon Hou and first recorded by the South African trumpeter Hugh Masekela. Released in the United States as a single in 1968, it followed United States trumpeter Herb Alpert's vocal performance of "This Guy's in Love with You" to the top spot on the Hot 100 chart, ranking it as the 18th biggest hit of the year. The song also reached No. 15 Adult Contemporary. Masekela included the song in his albums Grazing in the Grass: The Best of Hugh Masekela (2001), Still Grazing (2004), and Live at the Market Theatre (2006).

Masekela's recording was inducted into the Grammy Hall of Fame in 2018.

A vocal version by American vocal group The Friends of Distinction, with lyrics by band member Harry Elston, was a US chart hit in 1969. "Grazing in the Grass" has been recorded by many other musicians.

== Hugh Masekela recording ==
The music was inspired by an earlier novelty recording, "Mr. Bull No. 4", by Freddie Gumbi, which Masekela had heard in Zambia, that started with a cowbell. When Masekela was recording his debut album, the running order was short by three minutes and his record company suggested he add the tune. Philemon Hou, an actor and singer who was present in the studio, came up with a new melody while the backing track was already being recorded. The session was held at Gold Star Studios in Hollywood.

== Personnel ==
- Hugh Masekela – trumpet
- Bruce Langhorne – guitar
- Al Abreu – alto sax
- William Henderson – piano
- Henry Franklin – bass
- Chuck Carter – drums, cowbell

== Charts ==
Chart (1968)	Peak position
US Billboard Hot 100	1

== The Friends of Distinction version ==
"Grazing in the Grass"
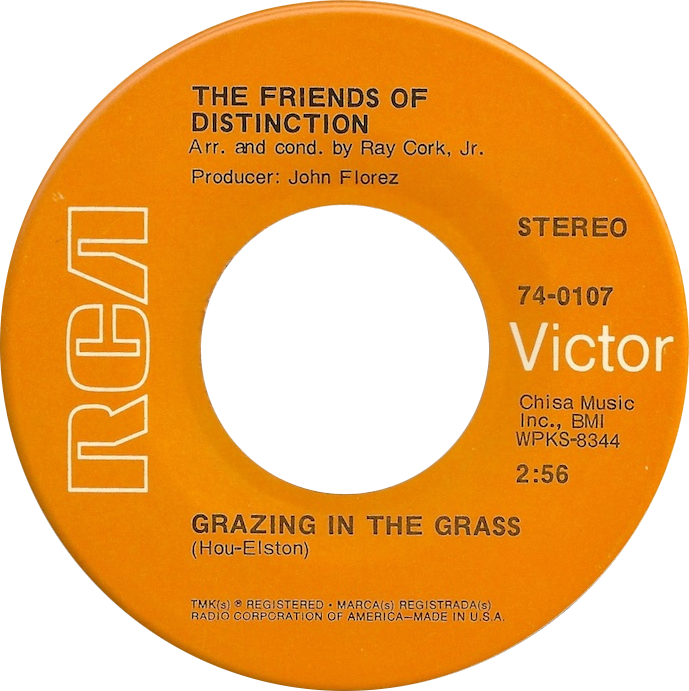
- Side A of the US single

Single by The Friends of Distinction

from the album Grazin'
- B-side: "I Really Hope You Do"
- Released: March 1969
- Recorded: 1969
- Length: 2:52
- Label: RCA Victor
- Songwriters: Philemon Hou; Harry Elston
- Producer: John Florez

The Friends of Distinction singles chronology
"Grazing in the Grass" (1969)	"Going in Circles" (1969)

Music video
- "Grazing in the Grass" on YouTube

The Friends of Distinction recorded a vocal remake of the tune in 1969 on RCA Victor, which was also a Top Ten pop and R&B hit, reaching No. 3 on the former and No. 5 on the latter. One of the group's members, Harry Elston, wrote lyrics for their version and sang lead vocals.

=== Personnel ===
- The Friends of Distinction – vocals
- Max Bennett – electric bass
- Jim Gordon – drums
- Al Casey and Arthur Wright – guitars
- Gene Cipriano – piccolo flute
- John Audino, Anthony Terran, Bud Childers, Dalton Smith – trumpets
- King Errisson – congas
- Douglas Davis – cello
- Jim Horn – tenor saxophone
- Garry Nuttycombe – viola
- Harry Bluestone, Jimmy Getzoff – violins
- Jack Arnold – percussion
- Larry Knechtel – piano

== Legacy ==
The Friends of Distinction performed the song on The Ed Sullivan Show on December 27, 1970, and appeared in a cameo section of Season 17, Episode 8 of the adult animated sitcom Family Guy. Their version also used in a 2023 TV commercial for Airbnb. A cover by Raven-Symoné is featured in the end credits of the animated film The Lion King 1½.

=== Charts ===
==== Weekly charts ====
Chart (1969)	Peak position
Canada RPM Top Singles	5
US Billboard Hot 100	3
US Billboard Hot Soul/R&B Singles	5
US Cash Box Top 100	6

==== Year-end charts ====
Chart (1969)	Rank
Canada	62
US Billboard Hot 100	17
US R&B (Billboard)	10
US Cash Box Top 100	59
