= Going in Circles =

American R&B Song

Single by The Friends of Distinction

from the album Grazin'
- A-side: "Let Yourself Go"
- Released: July 1969
- Recorded: December 16, 1968 at RCA's Music Center of the World, Hollywood, California
- Genre: R&B, soul
- Length: 4:32
- Label: RCA Victor; 74-0204
- Songwriters: Jerry Peters, Anita Poree
- Producer: John Florez

The Friends of Distinction singles chronology
| "Grazing in the Grass" (1969) | "Going in Circles" (1969) | "Love or Let Me Be Lonely" (1970) |

"Going in Circles" is a song written by Jerry Peters and Anita Poree, and originally performed by The Friends of Distinction on their 1969 album Grazin', reaching number 15 on the U.S. Hot 100, and number three on the R&B chart. The song has since been covered numerous times by other artists, including Isaac Hayes and Luther Vandross. In addition, the song's co-composer, Jerry Peters released his own version of the tune on his 1972 solo album Blueprint for Discovery. The Friends of Distinction's original version is an R.I.A.A. Certified Million-Seller. In Canada, the song was the flip of the single "Let Yourself Go", which in turn reached number 34 on the charts, September 6, 1969.

== Chart history ==
=== Weekly charts ===
| Chart (1969) | Peak position |
|---|---|
| Canada RPM | 24 |
| US Billboard Hot 100 | 15 |
| US Billboard Hot Soul Singles | 3 |

=== Year-end charts ===
| Chart (1969) | Rank |
|---|---|
| U.S. Soul/R&B (Billboard) | 21 |
| U.S. Billboard Hot 100 | 29 |

== Other notable versions ==
In 1970 Detroit blue eyed soul band Flaming Ember led by singer Jerry Plunk recorded a cover for the album Westbound #9.

In 1971, American singer/songwriter Issac Hayes did a cover version for the Black Moses album.

In 1985, the American R&B Band The Gap Band, recorded the cover version for the Gap Band VII album.

American R&B/soul singer Luther Vandross released a cover version on his 1994 standards album Songs. In 1995, his cover version was released as the B-side to "Love the One You're With". The song rose to number 28 on Billboard's Hot R&B Singles chart.
