= Whiteface (band) =

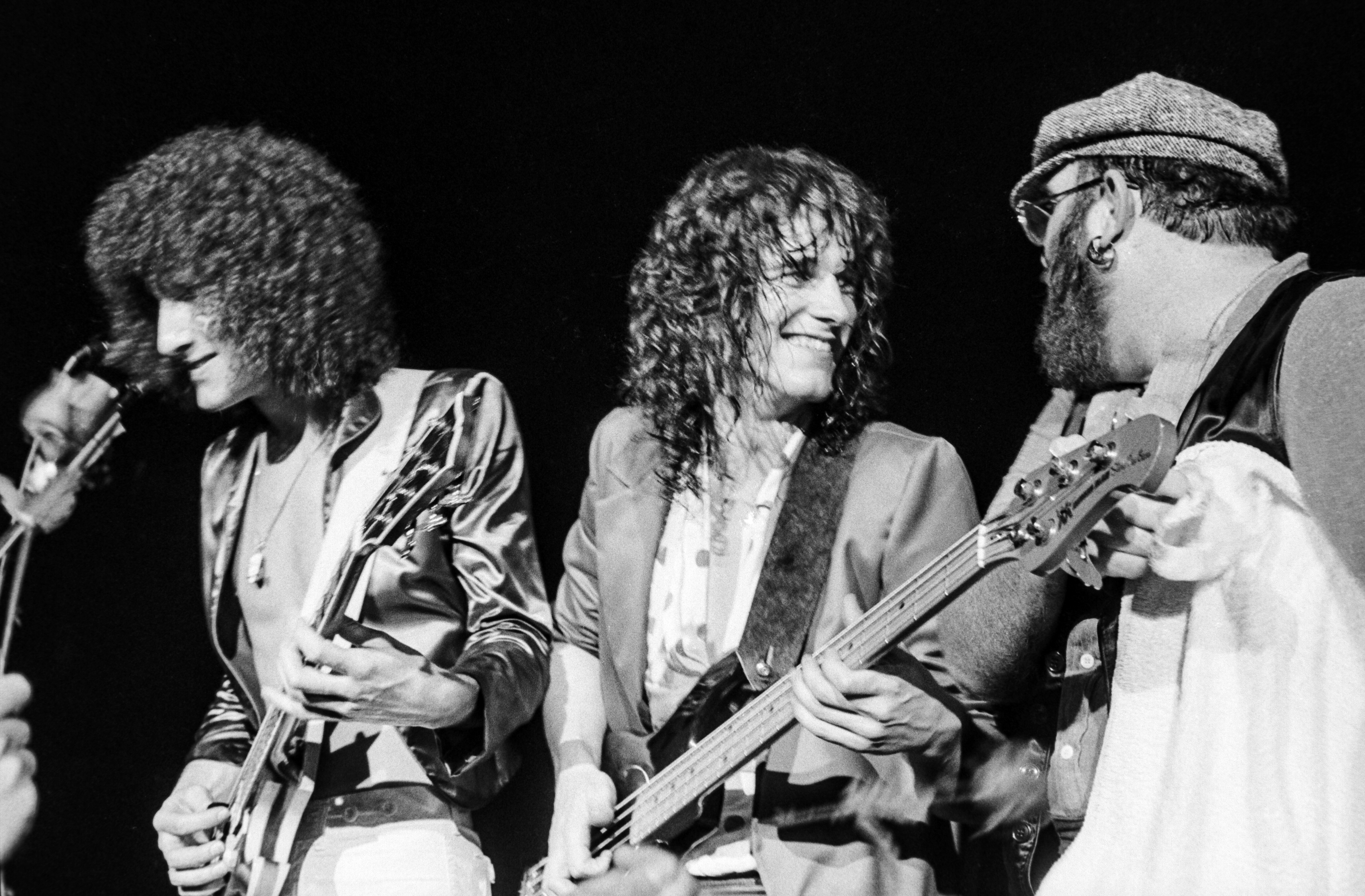
Whiteface guitarist Steve Harwick, Bassist Kyle Henderson and keyboardist Doug Bare at the May 18 Whiteface concert at the Agora Ballroom, Atlanta, Georgia

Whiteface was an American, Atlanta-based pop-rock-funk band formed in the late 1970s. Its members were technically proficient and each was a lead vocalist, giving the band an incredible vocal harmony sound. Their music style varied wildly from funk & R&B to pop & rock.

== Members ==
The core members for their album on Mercury Records featured keyboardist Doug "Bingo" Bare (died February 5, 2018), bassist Kyle Henderson, guitarist Steve Hardwick, and drummer Benny Rappa (died May 25, 2004).

== Formation ==
Whiteface recorded their debut album on Mercury Records. It failed to garner support, promotion and publicity from Mercury and the album slipped into obscurity.

After this album failed to sell, Kyle Henderson left the band to join The Producers, a new wave, post-punk, power-pop band from Atlanta which had 2 major-label releases, several [MTV] videos, enjoyed quite a bit of regional success into the `90's and some national success for a brief period in the early `80's.

== Personnel change ==
Barry Dunaway joined as the new bassist and the group recorded a new album called Change of Face in 1981. Their producer, Phil Benton, had worked with singer/songwriter Paul Davis and enlisted the band to back him on his 1981 hit singles "Cool Night" and "`65 Love Affair". Being talented musicians, the various members went on to perform as sidemen for some prominent acts in the `80's, including Ted Nugent, Pat Travers, Yngwie Malmsteen, Blackfoot, legendary British bluesman John Mayall. Doug Bare later formed a band called Bareback and toured the Southeast as a club favorite for many years.
