= The Sweet Life =

The Sweet Life may refer to:

- La dolce vita, a 1960 film directed by Federico Fellini
- The Sweet Life (album), a 1972 album by jazz organist Reuben Wilson
- The Sweet Life (film), an American comedy-drama film starring Chris Messina
- The Sweet Life (TV program), a daily lifestyle magazine program for women
- The Suite Life of Zack & Cody, an American children's television series that airs on the Disney Channel

== See also ==
- Sweet Life (disambiguation)
