= '65 Love Affair =

Single by Paul Davis

from the album Cool Night
- B-side: "We're Still Together"
- Released: February 1982
- Recorded: 1981
- Genre: Pop rock
- Length: 3:43
- Label: Arista
- Songwriter: Paul Davis
- Producers: Ed Seay and Paul Davis

Paul Davis singles chronology
| "Cool Night" (1981) | "'65 Love Affair" (1982) | "Love or Let Me Be Lonely" (1982) |

Audio
- "'65 Love Affair" on YouTube

"'65 Love Affair" is a song written and performed by Paul Davis on his album Cool Night.

== Background ==
This song marked Davis's second single release upon his departure from Bang Records to Arista, the first being "Cool Night". The style of "'65 Love Affair" was reminiscent of such blue-eyed soul groups as Hall & Oates, a vein that Davis had not explored before. Davis had originally titled the song "'55 Love Affair", but Arista felt that some modernization was needed to target an audience whose teenage years had occurred in the 1960s, including Davis himself. As Arista pointed out, Davis was only 7 years old in 1955, too young for a "love affair", but was 17 years old in 1965, perfect for the song. However, even with the title change, the song highlighted many aspects of 1950s youth culture, including carhops, drive-ins and doo-wop.

Davis's previous hits had been country-oriented or ballads. The format change to pop proved to be quite marketable. "'65 Love Affair" and "Cool Night", which were recorded at the same time, ranked first and third in terms of his Hot 100 peaks ("I Go Crazy" ranked second). Davis hated the final song, calling it "bubblegum" and "a sellout." In spite of this popular success, Davis was so disgusted with the commercialized result that he opted out of his contract with Arista and signed with Razor & Tie Record Company, a label on which Davis never charted on the Hot 100, before he left the music business for good in 1988.

== Music video ==
The music video is composed entirely of news archives from the year 1965, including footage of then US President Lyndon Johnson, the Vietnam War, and the Watts riots.

== Chart performance ==
Released in 1982, "'65 Love Affair" hit #6 for two weeks on the Billboard Hot 100 in May 1982. It spent 20 weeks on the chart, and on the Billboard Year-End Hot 100 chart, it placed at #39, and on Cashbox's chart at #60.

=== Weekly charts ===
| Chart (1982) | Peak position |
|---|---|
| Australian (Kent Music Report) | 71 |
| Canadian RPM Top Singles | 11 |
| Canada RPM Adult Contemporary | 4 |
| Ireland (IRMA) | 28 |
| New Zealand Singles Chart | 13 |
| Poland LP3 | 18 |
| US Billboard Hot 100 | 6 |
| US Billboard Adult Contemporary | 5 |
| US Cash Box Top 100 | 10 |

=== Year-end charts ===
| Chart (1982) | Rank |
|---|---|
| Canada | 96 |
| US Billboard Hot 100 | 39 |
| US Cash Box | 60 |
