= Love or Let Me Be Lonely =

1970 single by the Friends of Distinction

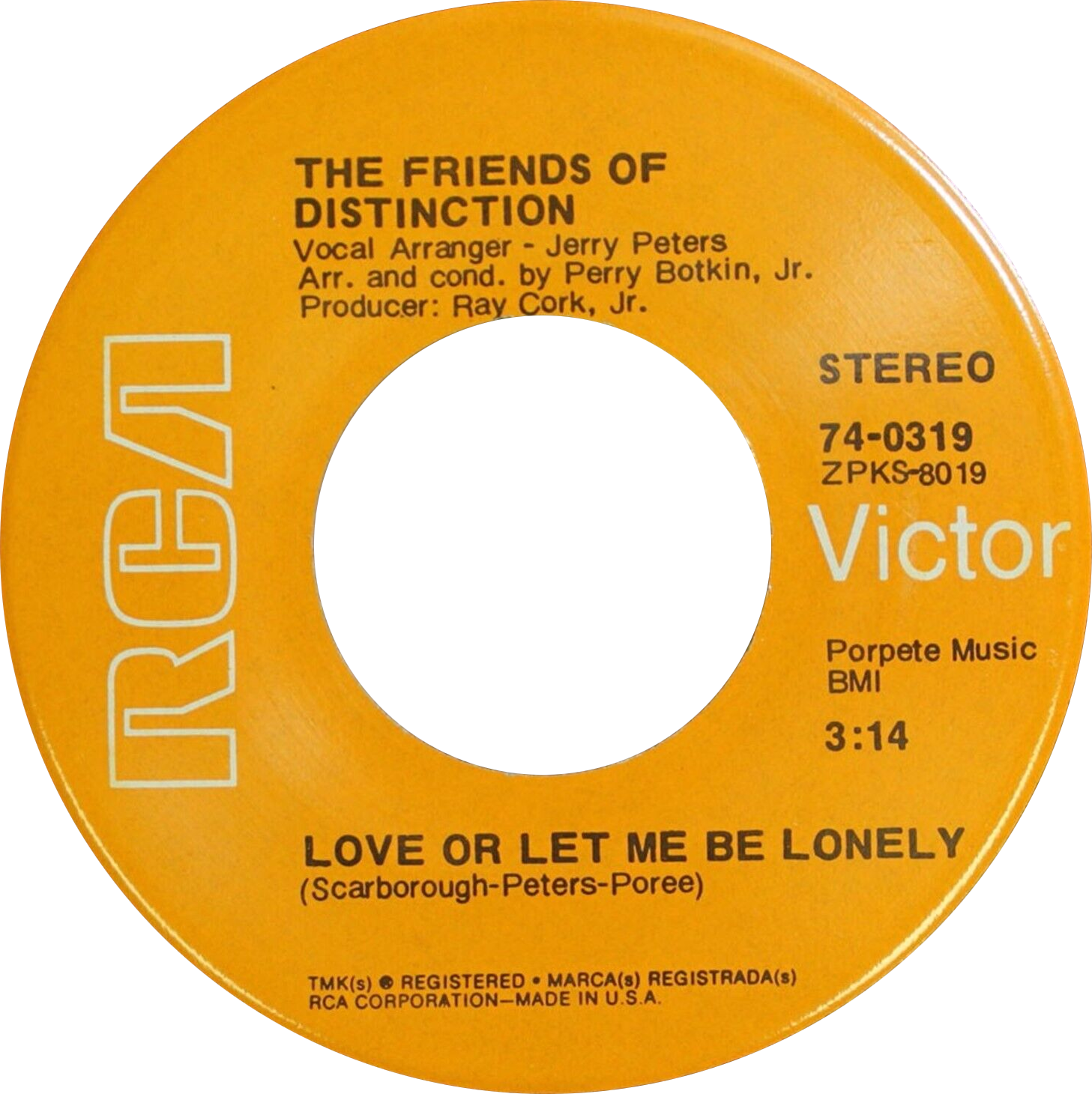
- Side A of the US single

Single by the Friends of Distinction

from the album Real Friends
- B-side: "This Generation"
- Released: March 1970
- Studio: RCA's Music Center of the World, Hollywood, CA, US
- Genre: Pop, R&B
- Length: 3:14
- Label: RCA Victor
- Songwriters: Skip Scarborough, Jerry Peters, Anita Poree
- Producers: Ray Cork, Jr.

The Friends of Distinction singles chronology
"Going in Circles/Let Yourself Go" (1969)	"Love or Let Me Be Lonely" (1970)	"Time Waits For No One" (1970)

"Love or Let Me Be Lonely" is a pop song recorded by the American soul group the Friends of Distinction and released as a single in early 1970. The song was a multi-format success, peaking at number 6 on the US Billboard Hot 100 on May 1, 1970. It also reached number 13 on the Soul Singles chart, and number nine on the Easy Listening singles chart. The song is ranked number 63 on the Hot 100 singles of 1970.

The song was written by Skip Scarborough, Jerry Peters and Anita Poree. The Friends of Distinction version features Charlene Gibson singing the lead vocals. In the lyrics, the singer is unsure of her future with her love interest. She wants a full commitment; either love her fully or she'd rather be lonely. "Part time love, I can find any day," she sings.

== Chart performance ==
=== Weekly charts ===
Chart (1970)	Peak position
U.S. Billboard Hot 100	6
U.S. Billboard Adult Contemporary	9
U.S. R&B Singles	13
U.S. Cash Box Top 100	8
Australia	55
Canadian RPM Top Singles	2

=== Year-end charts ===
Chart (1970)	Rank
U.S. Billboard Hot 100	63
U.S. Cash Box	55
Canada	35

== Paul Davis version ==
"Love or Let Me Be Lonely"

Single by Paul Davis

from the album Cool Night
- B-side: "Oriental Eyes"
- Released: July 13, 1982
- Recorded: 1980–1981
- Studio: Web IV Studios, Atlanta, GA, US
- Genre: Soft rock
- Length: 3:28
- Label: Arista
- Songwriters: Skip Scarborough, Jerry Peters, Anita Poree
- Producers: Ed Seay, Paul Davis

Paul Davis singles chronology
"'65 Love Affair" (1982)	"Love or Let Me Be Lonely" (1982)	"You're Still New to Me" (1986)

The song returned to the charts in the summer of 1982 in a version by American singer-songwriter Paul Davis. It was the third and final single from his 1981 album Cool Night (Davis' seventh, final, and breakthrough album). As with all of the tracks on Cool Night, Davis' version was co-produced by Davis himself and keyboardist Ed Seay. Davis' version of "Love or Let Me Be Lonely" reached number 40 on the US Hot 100, and number 11 on the Adult Contemporary chart.

This would be Davis' final single as the lead artist and last single overall for five years until he was featured on Marie Osmond's "You're Still New to Me". Davis would retire from music altogether in 1988, and he died in 2008.

=== Chart performance ===
Chart (1982)	Peak position
Canada RPM Adult Contemporary	29
U.S. Billboard Hot 100	40
U.S. Billboard Adult Contemporary	11
U.S. Cash Box Top 100	41

== Sylvie Vartan version (in French) ==
"La chasse à l'homme"

Single by Sylvie Vartan
- Language: French
- English title: The manhunt
- B-side: "J’ai deux mains"
- Released: August 1970
- Recorded: Early–mid 1970
- Genre: Pop, R&B
- Length: 3:07
- Label: RCA
- Songwriters: Skip Scarborough, Jerry Peters, Anita Poree, Gilles Thibault

Sylvie Vartan singles chronology
"Aime-moi" (1970)	"La chasse à l'homme" (1970)	"Loup" (1971)

In August 1970, the song was adapted into French as "La chasse à l'homme" (meaning "the manhunt") by Gilles Thibault and recorded by French pop singer Sylvie Vartan, who released her version as a non-album single, five months after the release of the original Friends of Distinction version. Vartan's version peaked at number 17 on the French Belgian charts on October 24, 1970.

=== Charts ===
Chart (1970)	Peak position
Belgium (Ultratop 50 Wallonia)	17
