= Greg Guidry =

American singer-songwriter

Background information
- Born: Gregory Mark Guidry; January 23, 1954; St. Louis, Missouri, U.S.
- Died: July 28, 2003 (aged 49) Fairview, Tennessee, U.S.
- Genres: AOR, pop rock, soul, jazz
- Occupations: Singer-songwriter, musician
- Years active: 1975–2003

Gregory Mark Guidry (January 23, 1954 – July 28, 2003) was an American singer-songwriter.

Born in St. Louis, Missouri, he played piano and sang gospel as a child, and sang in a band with future Doobie Brother Michael McDonald as a teenager. With help from Rich Lang, a friend and fellow musician, they wrote and recorded several demos, drove to New York City from St. Louis, and signed a publishing contract with CBS Records in 1977 and wrote songs for Climax Blues Band, Robbie Dupree, Exile, Johnnie Taylor, Sawyer Brown, and Reba McEntire. In 1981, he sang as a backing vocalist for the Allman Brothers Band on their 1981 album Brothers of the Road. He signed with Columbia in 1982 and released an album, Over the Line, which produced two hit singles, "Goin' Down" (US No. 17, US AC No. 11) and a duet with his sister Sandy, "Into My Love" (US No. 92).

While he continued to do songwriting work later in the 1980s, he did not issue a follow-up album until 2000, when Soul'd Out and Private Session were released, and his debut album was re-released.

On July 28, 2003, Guidry died in a fire at age 49. His charred body was found in a car parked in his garage in Fairview, Tennessee.

== Discography ==
=== Albums ===
Year	Album	Billboard 200	Record label
1982	Over the Line	147	Columbia Records
2000	Soul'd Out	—	Seymour Records
2000	Private Session	—	Seymour Records
2014	The Demo Years	—	SCORE Records
2017	Heart To Heart	—	SCORE Records

=== Singles ===
Year	Title	Peak chart positions		Record Label	B-side	Album
Year	Title	US	AC	Record Label	B-side	Album
1982	"Goin' Down"	17	11	Columbia Records	"Darlin' It's You"	Over the Line
1982	"Into My Love"	92	—	Columbia Records	"Are You Ready for Love"	Over the Line

== Notable songs written by Guidry ==
- "You're Good for Me" - Single by Exile in 1980 (No. 105 US; No. 44 US AC)
- "Gotta Have More Love" - Single by Climax Blues Band in 1980 (No. 47 US; No. 77 AU)
- "I Got This Thing for Your Love" - Single by Johnnie Taylor in 1980 (No. 77 US R&B)
- "Are You Ready for Love" - Single by Robbie Dupree in 1981
- "Ball and Chain" - Canadian single by B4-4 in 2001
