= Sweet Life (Paul Davis song) =

Single by Paul Davis

from the album Singer of Songs: Teller of Tales
- B-side: "Bad Dream"
- Released: August 1978
- Recorded: 1977
- Genre: Soft rock
- Length: 3:28
- Label: Bang
- Songwriters: Paul Davis, Susan Collins
- Producers: Phil Benton; Paul Davis

Paul Davis singles chronology
"Darlin'" (1978)	"Sweet Life" (1978)	"Do Right" (1980)

"Sweet Life" is a song written, composed, and recorded by American singer-songwriter Paul Davis. It was the third single he released from his 1977 album Singer of Songs: Teller of Tales, and his fourth-highest peaking pop hit, peaking at #17 on the Billboard chart on the week of December 16, 1978. On the Cash Box chart, the song spent three weeks at #15. The song also reached #15 in Canada.

"Sweet Life" spent five months on the U.S. charts, longer than any of Davis' other singles except "I Go Crazy."

== Chart performance ==
=== Weekly charts ===
Chart (1978–79)	Peak position
Canadian RPM Top Singles	15
U.S. Billboard Hot 100	17
U.S. Cash Box Top 100	15
U.S. Billboard Adult Contemporary	7
U.S. Billboard Country	85

=== Year-end charts ===
Chart (1978)	Rank
Canada	104
U.S. (Joel Whitburn's Pop Annual)	121

== Other versions ==
- A new version by Davis as a duet with Marie Osmond made the Country charts in 1988, reaching #47 (U.S.) and #55 (Canada).
- A cover version was recorded by Frederick Knight and Fern Kinney the same year 1978 on Chimneyville Records based in Jackson, Mississippi, a subsidiary of Malaco Records.
