= The Producers (American band) =

US musical group

- Origin: Atlanta, Georgia
- Genres: Rock, rock and roll, power pop, new wave
- Years active: 1981–present
- Labels: Portrait, Marathon, One Way
- Members: Wayne Famous; Kyle Henderson; Bryan Holmes; Van Temple
- Past members: Tim Smith

The Producers is a new wave and power pop band from Atlanta, Georgia. The original line up included Van Temple on guitar and vocals, former Whiteface member Kyle Henderson on bass and vocals, former Billy Joe Royal sideman Wayne Famous (Wayne McNatt) on keyboards, and Bryan Holmes on drums.

== History ==
Originally formed as a Beatles cover band named Cartoon, they changed musical directions and began performing their own material in nightclubs around the Atlanta area. The response to their music was so good that they were quickly signed to Columbia Records subsidiary Portrait Records by producer Tom Werman, who had worked with Cheap Trick, REO Speedwagon and Mother's Finest. They released two albums for the Portrait label: The Producers (1981) and You Make the Heat (1982). The Producers became a regional favorite in the southeastern United States, propelling "What She Does to Me" onto the national Billboard Magazine singles charts. "What's He Got", "Certain Kinda Girl", and "Who Do You Think You Are" had some popularity as music videos on MTV, but did not chart. The band toured extensively in the early 1980s, opening for Cheap Trick and The Motels. "She Sheila" from their second album was also a popular MTV video. They headlined MTV's New Year's Rockin Eve broadcast in 1982.

The balding keyboardist Wayne Famous had the goofy, comedic stage presence to contrast with the other rock stars in the band, similar to Rick Nielsen of Cheap Trick. Years ahead of the keytar, he modified the keyboard of an Oberheim OB-X with straps to hold it around his neck allowing him to perform and dance center stage. His own invention, he used an umbilical cable to communicate with the remaining electronics off stage, frequently repairing his contraption on stage.

== Discography ==
=== Albums ===
Year	Title	Billboard 200	Record label	Comments
1981	The Producers	163	Portrait Records	Single "What She Does to Me" reached number 61 on the Billboard Hot 100 and "What's He Got" bubbled under at 108.
1982	You Make the Heat		Portrait Records	Single "She Sheila" reached number 48 on the Billboard Mainstream Rock chart.
1985	Run for Your Life	—	Marathon Records	
2000	The Producers/You Make the Heat	—	One Way Records	First two LPs, The Producers and You Make the Heat remastered and released on one CD.
2001	Coelacanth	—	One Way Records	Originally recorded for MCA Records in 1988/89 but never released by the label.
2012	In the Blues	—	Unreleased	Recorded/produced by bluesman Tab Benoit. Although there was a record debut event in early 2013, the album was never issued and shelved for unknown reasons.

== Aftermath ==
Despite this success, Portrait Records dropped the band after only two albums. Kyle Henderson became a born-again Christian and left the band to record a solo album for Kerry Livgren's Christian rock label, Kerygma Records and was replaced by future Jellyfish, Umajets, and Sheryl Crow bassist Tim Smith (not to be confused with another musician named Tim Smith — born 1961 — of the progressive art punk outfit Cardiacs). The next Producers album, Run For Your Life, was released in 1985 on a small Atlanta-based independent label. That album featured a collaboration between The Producers and Kansas, "Can't Cry Anymore," a song which appeared on both Run For Your Life and the 1986 Kansas album Power. The Producers regained a major label contract in the late 1980s with MCA Records and recorded what was to be their fourth album, Coelacanth, but the band was one of several dropped in a 1989 label purge at MCA before the album could be released. Coelacanth was finally released in 2001.

== Today ==
Lead vocal/guitarist Van Temple now moonlights with bands The Rainmen and Reason Y in Atlanta. He also occasionally teaches.

Original bass player and vocalist Kyle Henderson resides in Madison, Wisconsin, and recently released a new solo album entitled "Brand New Chance". He also fronts a band called Kyle Henderson's Blue Eyed Soul, a four piece that covers songs by Marvin Gaye, The Temptations, Otis Redding, plus modern purveyors of that tradition.

Keyboardist Wayne "Famous" McNatt is currently a taxi driver in the Atlanta area and occasionally does session, composer and sound effects jobs.

Drummer Bryan Holmes is currently owner and president of Prestige Carpet & Flooring in Jonesboro, Georgia, where he lives with wife and daughters.

Although The Producers officially "retired" in 1991, the band continues to reunite for occasional live shows, primarily in the southeastern and mid-western United States.
