= When Will I See You Again (Johnny Mathis album) =

Studio album by Johnny Mathis
- Released: March 1975
- Recorded: January 13, 1975; January 20, 1975; January 23, 1975
- Genre: Traditional pop; vocal pop
- Length: 33:42
- Label: Columbia
- Producer: John Florez

Johnny Mathis chronology
The Heart of a Woman (1974)	When Will I See You Again (1975)	Feelings (1975)

Professional ratings
Review scores
Source	Rating
Allmusic	3/5 stars
Billboard	positive
The Encyclopedia of Popular Music	3/5 stars

When Will I See You Again is an album by American pop singer Johnny Mathis that was released in March 1975 by Columbia Records and was again predominantly composed of covers of recent hit songs by other artists.

The album made its first appearance on Billboard magazine's Top LP's & Tapes chart in the issue dated April 19, 1975, and remained there for 13 weeks, peaking at number 99. It entered the UK album chart on July 26, 1975, and reached number 13 during its 10 weeks there. On September 1, 1975, the British Phonographic Industry awarded the album with Silver certification for sales of 60,000 units.

== Reception ==
Joe Viglione of AllMusic, writing retrospectively, warns, "If the casual fan thinks the album is full of Philly sound knockoffs, guess again. Producer John Florez and arranger/conductor D'Arneill Pershing align the stars perfectly for Mathis." He enjoyed a variety of songs on this release, especially the title track, which he describes as "reinvented -- one voice leading the charge with backing vocals chiming in at the right time. Where the Three Degrees punched it for all it was worth as a team effort, Johnny Mathis reads the sentiment over a light disco beat with that soul sound that Gamble & Huff manufactured kept to a minimum. The Platters' 'Only You' may seem like a quantum leap away from the '70s compositions that predominate this collection, but the arrangement borders on jazz/pop and fits nicely alongside the other pretty moments here." He also highlights his favorites from side two. "The medley of Paul Williams/Roger Nichols tunes, 'I Won't Last a Day Without You'/'Let Me Be the One', which leads off side two, is as immaculate as the closing number, 'The Things I Might Have Been', making for another very good no-bumps-in-the-road Johnny Mathis release."

== Track listing ==
=== Side one ===
1. "Mandy" (Scott English, Richard Kerr) – 3:31
2. "Nice to Be Around" (John Williams, Paul Williams) – 3:52
3. "You're As Right As Rain" (Thom Bell, Linda Creed) – 3:02
4. "When Will I See You Again" (Kenny Gamble, Leon Huff) – 2:35
5. "Only You (And You Alone)" (Buck Ram) – 2:50

=== Side two ===
1. Medley – 4:06
  a. "Let Me Be the One" (Roger Nichols, Paul Williams)
  b. "I Won't Last a Day Without You" (Nichols, Paul Williams)
2. "The Way We Were" from The Way We Were (Alan Bergman, Marilyn Bergman, Marvin Hamlisch) – 3:49
3. "Laughter in the Rain" (Neil Sedaka, Phil Cody) – 2:31
4. "You and Me Against the World" (Kenny Ascher, Paul Williams) – 3:59
5. "The Things I Might Have Been" (Richard M. Sherman, Robert B. Sherman) – 3:27

== Recording dates ==
From the liner notes for The Voice of Romance: The Columbia Original Album Collection:

- January 13, 1975 – "Laughter in the Rain", "Only You (And You Alone)", "The Way We Were", "You and Me Against the World"
- January 20, 1975 – "Mandy", "The Things I Might Have Been", "When Will I See You Again"
- January 23, 1975 – "Let Me Be the One/I Won't Last a Day Without You", "Nice to Be Around", "You're As Right As Rain"

== Song information ==
The most successful incarnation of "Mandy" was by Barry Manilow, who spent a week at number one with the song on the Billboard Hot 100 and two weeks in the top spot on the magazine's Easy Listening chart in addition to reaching number 11 in the UK and receiving Gold certification from the Recording Industry Association of America. "Nice to Be Around" originated in the 1973 film Cinderella Liberty as "You're So Nice to Be Around" and also "bubbled under" the Hot 100 to number 101 as a recording by Maureen McGovern that also got as high as number 28 Easy Listening. "You're As Right As Rain" first appeared on the 1972 Stylistics album Round 2.

"When Will I See You Again" by The Three Degrees enjoyed two weeks at number one on the UK singles chart and a week in that position on Billboard's Easy Listening chart, peaked at number two pop and number four R&B, and received Platinum certification from the RIAA. The Platters had the biggest hit version of "Only You (And You Alone)", which spent seven weeks at number one R&B and made it to number five on the Billboard Hot 100. "Let Me Be the One" first appeared on the self-titled 1971 album by The Carpenters, and the brother-and-sister duo also had the most popular recording of "I Won't Last a Day Without You", which had a week at number one on the Easy Listening chart and got as high as number 11 pop and number nine UK.

"The Way We Were" earned songwriters Alan Bergman, Marilyn Bergman, and Marvin Hamlisch the Grammy Award for Song of the Year and the Academy Award for Best Original Song. Barbra Streisand's recording of the song went Gold, spent three weeks at number one on the Billboard Hot 100 and two weeks in the Easy Listening top spot, and peaked at number 31 UK. Neil Sedaka's "Laughter in the Rain" also spent two weeks at number one Easy Listening in addition to enjoying a week in that position on the pop chart and peaking at number 15 in the UK. Another number one Easy Listening hit that Mathis covers here, "You and Me Against the World" by Helen Reddy, also made it to number nine on the Hot 100. And by the time this album was released, "The Things I Might Have Been" had been recorded as a solo by Kitty Wells, Willie Nelson, and Roy Clark and as a duet by Kris Kristofferson and Rita Coolidge.

== Personnel ==
From the liner notes of the original album:

- Johnny Mathis – vocals
- John Florez – producer
- D'Arneill Pershing - arranger, conductor
- Grover Helsley – engineer
- Emerson-Loew – photography
- Ron Coro – design
- Nancy Donald – design

== Bibliography ==
- O'Neil, Thomas (1999), The Grammys, Perigree Books, ISBN 0399524770
- Whitburn, Joel (2004), Joel Whitburn Presents Top R&B/Hip-Hop Singles, 1942-2004, Record Research Inc., ISBN 0-89820-160-8
- Whitburn, Joel (2007), Joel Whitburn Presents Billboard Top Adult Songs, 1961-2006, Record Research Inc., ISBN 978-0898201697
- Whitburn, Joel (2009), Joel Whitburn's Top Pop Singles, 1955-2008, Record Research Inc., ISBN 978-0-89820-180-2
- Whitburn, Joel (2010), Joel Whitburn Presents Top Pop Albums, Seventh Edition, Record Research Inc., ISBN 978-0-89820-183-3
- Wiley, Mason; Bona, Damien (1996), Inside Oscar: The Unofficial History of the Academy Awards, Ballantine Books, ISBN 0345400534
