= Everybody's Crazy 'Bout My Baby =

Single by Marie Osmond

from the album I Only Wanted You
- B-side: "Making Magic"
- Released: April 11, 1987
- Genre: Country
- Length: 3:41
- Label: Capitol/Curb
- Songwriter(s): Mike Reid
- Producer(s): Paul Worley

Marie Osmond singles chronology
"I Only Wanted You" (1986)	"Everybody's Crazy 'Bout My Baby" (1987)	"Cry Just a Little" (1987)

"Everybody's Crazy 'Bout My Baby" is a song recorded by American country music artist Marie Osmond. It was released in April 1987 as the third single from the album I Only Wanted You. The song reached #24 on the Billboard Hot Country Singles & Tracks chart. The song was written by Mike Reid.

== Chart performance ==
Chart (1987)	Peak position
US Hot Country Songs (Billboard)	24
Canadian RPM Country Tracks	34
