= It Don't Matter to Me =

1970 song performed by Bread

Single by Bread

from the album Bread
- B-side: "Call on Me"
- Released: September 1970
- Genre: Soft rock
- Length: 2:51
- Label: Elektra
- Songwriter: David Gates
- Producer: David Gates

Bread singles chronology
"Make It with You" (1970)	"It Don't Matter to Me" (1970)	"Let Your Love Go" (1970)

"It Don't Matter to Me" is a song written by David Gates and originally recorded by the pop-rock group Bread, of which Gates was a member. It was a Top 10 hit in the U.S. and Canada. In the U.S., it reached No. 10 on the Billboard Hot 100 and No. 7 on the Cash Box Top 100. In Canada, "It Doesn't Matter to Me" spent two weeks at No. 6, and is ranked as the 81st biggest hit of 1970.

Record World said that it "sounds like another big one for Bread and their gentle sound."

"It Don't Matter to Me" was included on the group's 1969 debut LP rather than their second album from which the previous single, "Make It with You", was taken. The 1970 single release was a new version, different from the 1969 album cut.

== Chart performance ==
=== Weekly charts ===
Chart (1970)	Peak position
Australia KMR	29
Canada RPM Top Singles	6
New Zealand (Listener)	19
US Billboard Hot 100	10
US Billboard Easy Listening	2
US Cash Box Top 100	7

=== Year-end charts ===
Chart (1970)	Rank
Canada	81
US (Joel Whitburn's Pop Annual)	96
