= Paper Roses =

1960 single by Anita Bryant

Single by Anita Bryant

from the album Hear Anita Bryant in Your Home Tonight!
- B-side: "Mixed Emotions"
- Released: April 1960
- Recorded: 1960
- Genre: Traditional pop
- Length: 2:49
- Label: Carlton 528
- Songwriters: Fred Spielman, Janice Torre
- Producer: Monty Kelly

Anita Bryant singles chronology
"Till There Was You" (1959)	"Paper Roses" (1960)	"My Little Corner of the World" (1960)

"Paper Roses" is a popular song written and composed by Fred Spielman and Janice Torre. It first was a top five hit in 1960 for Anita Bryant. Marie Osmond recorded it in 1973 and took her version to number one on the US country chart.

== Anita Bryant version ==
Anita Bryant's version of "Paper Roses" was originally released in 1960 as a single, backed with "Mixed Emotions" (Carlton 528). Monty Kelly provided the orchestrations. It was the opening track on her 1961 album Hear Anita Bryant In Your Home Tonight! (Carlton STLP 12/127), recorded in "Provocative Stereo." "Paper Roses" was Bryant's biggest hit on the Billboard Pop chart, peaking at No. 5 in 1960. Bryant continued to release singles following "Paper Roses"' success, and although some reached the Top 40, she never had another hit as big as "Paper Roses."

=== Charts ===
Chart (1960)	Peak position
Canada (CHUM Hit Parade)	1
New Zealand (Lever Hit Parades)	3
UK Singles (Official Charts)	24
US Billboard Hot 100	5
US Hot R&B Sides (Billboard)	16
US Cash Box Top 100	7

== Marie Osmond version ==
"Paper Roses"

Single by Marie Osmond

from the album Paper Roses
- B-side: "Least of All You"
- Released: August 25, 1973
- Recorded: June 7, 1973
- Studio: Columbia (Nashville, Tennessee)
- Genre: Country pop
- Length: 2:38
- Label: MGM 2006 315
- Songwriters: Fred Spielman, Janice Torre
- Producer: Sonny James

Marie Osmond singles chronology
"Paper Roses" (1973)	"In My Little Corner of the World" (1974)

=== Background ===
In 1973, Marie Osmond's brothers, The Osmonds, were already well-established as stars in the pop music world and as teen idols (especially Donny). The Osmonds' management convinced Marie Osmond to try her hand at singing as well, and soon she was performing with her brothers on tour, but not officially as a member. When she began to record, she took a different tack from her brothers musically: she decided to try to make it big in country music. Osmond was soon signed to MGM Records in Los Angeles, California.

Mike Curb, who had overseen Donny Osmond's solo hit covers of oldies like "Go Away Little Girl", "Puppy Love", "Sweet and Innocent," and "Hey Girl," used the same approach with Marie Osmond. According to Curb in the book Billboard's Hottest Hot 100 Hits by Fred Bronson, when Curb was looking for country songs for her to record for her first album, Sonny James suggested that Osmond sing "Paper Roses."

=== Release ===
"Paper Roses" was the first song recorded by Osmond as a solo performer, and also her first single release. The single was released in August 1973. MGM promoted the single first to country radio, and received a favorable reaction to the song from radio stations and disc jockeys. Soon the song became a hit for Osmond, going all the way to number one on the country charts. Before long, the song crossed over to pop radio as well, becoming a number 5 Pop and number 1 Easy Listening singles hit. Coincidentally, on the pop charts, it peaked at the same position as Anita Bryant's version. The album and single both received Gold certifications in the United States.

Upon reaching No. 1, Osmond became—at less than one month after her 14th birthday—the youngest female artist and youngest overall solo artist to reach No. 1 on the Billboard Hot Country Songs chart, a record that still stands as of 2025. In the United Kingdom, where Osmond-mania was just as strong as (if not stronger than) in the United States, "Paper Roses" climbed all the way to number 2 on the UK Singles Chart. Osmond followed up the success of "Paper Roses" with a cover of another Anita Bryant hit from 1960, "My Little Corner of the World," but it didn't fare as well, reaching only number 33 on the country-music charts, and bubbling under the pop charts.

She re-recorded "Paper Roses" with the same producer and in the same studio for her 1990 The Best of Marie Osmond greatest hits album on Curb Records because her record label at the time did not have the rights to include the original recording.

Her "Paper Roses" has been adopted by fans of the Scottish football team Kilmarnock F.C. as the club's anthem and is played at major games throughout the season.

=== Charts ===
==== Weekly charts ====
Chart (1973–74)	Peak position
Australia (Kent Music Report)	11
Canada Top Singles (RPM)	12
Canada Country Singles (RPM)	1
Canada Adult Contemporary (RPM)	3
Ireland (IRMA)	6
New Zealand (Listener)	12
South Africa (Springbok)	10
UK Singles Chart	2
US Hot Country Songs (Billboard)	1
US Billboard Hot 100	5
US Adult Contemporary (Billboard)	1
US Cash Box Top 100	6

==== Year-end charts ====
Chart (1973)	Rank
Canada RPM Top Singles	69
UK	50
US Billboard Easy Listening	42
US Cash Box	80
Chart (1974)	Rank
Australia (Kent Music Report)	73

== Other versions ==
"Paper Roses" became an oft-covered song internationally in 1960, as Billboard magazine reported in its 6 June 1960 issue that no fewer than 33 different versions had been released in various European countries, including four versions in the UK and six in Germany alone. It also reported that the song was thought to have infringed on the copyright of a number of songs in Germany, the UK and the US.

- A version of "Paper Roses" was recorded by Maureen Evans in 1960, reaching number 40 in June on the UK Singles Chart.
- The Kaye Sisters had a hit with their version which reached number 7 on 14 September 1960 on the UK chart.
- A version was also recorded by Cristy Lane for one of her Country Classics albums.
- In the UK Dame Vera Lynn recorded the song for her album Vera Lynn in Nashville.
- Connie Smith recorded a version for her 1966 album Born to Sing.
- In 1974, Flor Silvestre recorded a Spanish version, "Vuelve pronto" ("Come Back Soon"), for her album Con todo mi amor a mi lindo Puerto Rico.
- In 1975, Loretta Lynn recorded a version of "Paper Roses" on her Back to the Country album.
- In 1975, the Shaggs recorded a version for their unfinished second album, which was finally released in 1982 on the compilation album Shaggs' Own Thing
- In 1977, Slim Whitman, recorded "Paper Roses" for his number 2 Home on the Range album.
- In 1998, Jolina Magdangal recorded "Paper Roses" for her album Jolina released by Star Music.
- Country duo Joey + Rory recorded a version for their 2014 album Country Classics: A Tapestry of Our Musical Heritage.
- In 2017, Kathryn Bernardo recorded "Paper Roses" for her second album Lovelife with Kath released by Star Music.
