= You're Still New to Me =

Single by Marie Osmond with Paul Davis

from the album I Only Wanted You
- B-side: "New Love"
- Released: July 1986
- Genre: Country
- Length: 3:20
- Label: Capitol/Curb
- Songwriter(s): Paul Davis; Paul Overstreet
- Producer(s): Paul Worley

Marie Osmond singles chronology
"Read My Lips" (1986)	"You're Still New to Me" (1986)	"I Only Wanted You" (1986)

Paul Davis singles chronology
"Love or Let Me Be Lonely" (1982)	"You're Still New to Me" (1986)	"I Won't Take Less Than Your Love" (1987)

"You're Still New to Me" is a song written by Paul Davis and Paul Overstreet, and recorded by American country music artist Marie Osmond as a duet with Davis. It was released in July 1986 as the first single from Osmond's album I Only Wanted You. The song was the only collaboration as a duo for Osmond and Davis (though Davis had written Osmond's other number-one duet, "Meet Me in Montana," for her and Dan Seals) and went to number one on the country chart. The single was number one for one week and spent a total of thirteen weeks on the country chart. When performed live since Davis's death, Jay Osmond, Marie's brother, usually serves as her duet partner.

== Charts ==
Chart (1986)	Peak position
US Hot Country Songs (Billboard)	1
Canadian RPM Country Tracks	1
