= The Friends of Distinction =

American rhythm and blues group

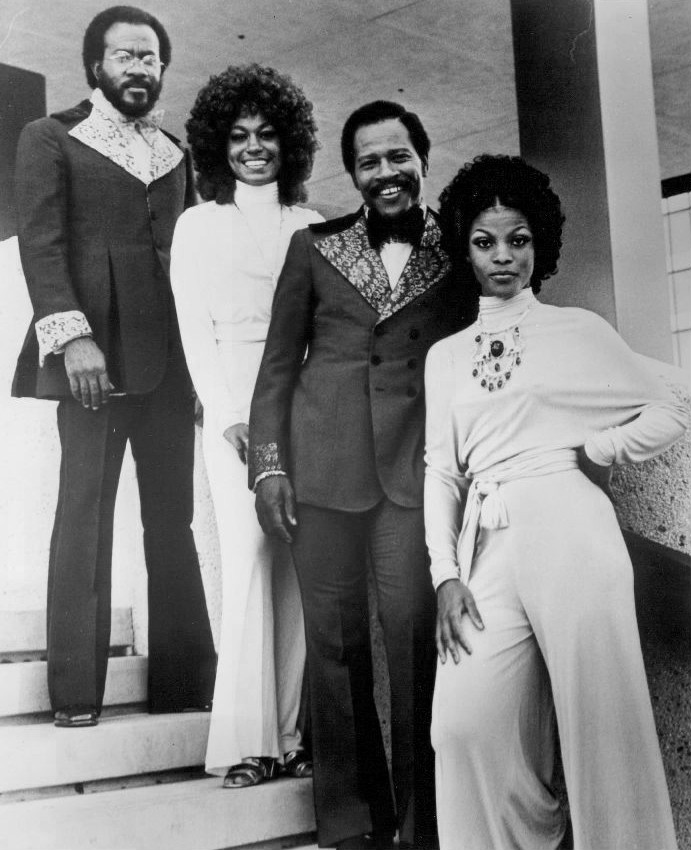
- The Friends of Distinction in 1973. Floyd Butler, Dani McCormick, Harry Elston, Dianne Jackson

Background information
- Origin: Los Angeles, California, United States
- Genres: R&B; pop; soul; sunshine pop; psychedelic soul
- Years active: 1968–1975
- Label: RCA Records
- Past members: Floyd Butler; Dani McCormick; Harry Elston; Dianne Jackson; Charlene Gibson; Jessica Cleaves; Barbara Jean Love

The Friends of Distinction were an American vocal group founded by Harry Elston and Floyd Butler, best known for their 1969 RIAA-certified Gold hits "Grazing in the Grass" and "Going in Circles" and the 1970 hit "Love or Let Me Be Lonely", with all three reaching the Hot 100's top 15.

== Career ==
The Friends of Distinction formed in 1968 in Los Angeles with original members Floyd Butler (June 5, 1937 – April 29, 1990), Harry Elston (November 4, 1938 – March 4, 2025), Jessica Cleaves (December 10, 1948 – May 2, 2014), and Barbara Jean Love (born July 24, 1941). Butler and Elston had worked together in The Hi-Fi's in the mid 1960s, often opening for Ray Charles. Other members of the Hi-Fi's were Marilyn McCoo and Lamont McLemore, who would later co-found The Fifth Dimension.

The Friends of Distinction were discovered by American football player Jim Brown, who also discovered Earth, Wind & Fire, and were signed to RCA Records.

The Friends' first major hit, "Grazing in the Grass", was an Elston-sung vocal cover version of an instrumental hit by Hugh Masekela, with lyrics written by Elston. Released in March 1969, this gold record went Top 5 on both the pop and soul charts in the U.S., peaking at No. 3 on the Billboard Hot 100 in June. The follow-up ballad "Going in Circles" also charted highly, hitting No. 15 in November.

When Love took time off during her pregnancy, Charlene Gibson replaced her, singing lead on the Friends' third hit, "Love or Let Me Be Lonely", which peaked at No. 6 on the Billboard Hot 100 on 2-9 May 1970. The Friends were prolific between 1969 and 1973, releasing six albums, with a seventh in 1976. They also released numerous singles, including "Check It Out" and a cover of Neil Sedaka's "Time Waits for No One". They also released a cover of Bread's "It Don't Matter To Me" shortly after the original's release in 1970.

The group quit touring in 1976, and broke up soon afterward. Cleaves sang with Earth, Wind & Fire for a number of years.

"Going in Circles" has been covered by Isaac Hayes, The Gap Band and Luther Vandross, and "Love or Let Me Be Lonely" by Paul Davis.

In 1990, Elston and Butler planned to revive the Friends of Distinction, but Butler suffered a heart attack and died at the age of 52 on April 29 of that year. He had already written songs for the group and one composition he co-wrote, "Check It Out", was a hit for the group Tavares. Elston formed a new quartet, also called The Friends of Distinction, and the group continues to give live performances.

Jessica Cleaves died on May 2, 2014, from a stroke at the age of 65.

Harry Elston died on March 4, 2025, at the age of 86.

== Discography ==
=== Studio albums ===
Year	Title	Peak chart positions			Record label
Year	Title	US Pop	US R&B	CAN	Record label
1969	Grazin'	35	10	17	RCA
1969	Highly Distinct	173	14	—	RCA
1970	Real Friends	68	9	49	RCA
1970	Whatever	179	42	—	RCA
1971	Friends & People	166	—	—	RCA
1973	Love Can Make It Easier	—	—	—	RCA
1975	Reviviscence – Live to Light Again	—	—	—	RCA
"—" denotes a recording that did not chart or was not released in that territory.

=== Compilation albums ===
- Greatest Hits (1973, RCA Victor)
- Golden Classics (1989, Collectables)
- Best of the Friends of Distinction (1996, RCA)
- Going in Circles (2005, RCA/Sony BMG)

=== Singles ===
Year	Title	Peak chart positions					Certifications	Album
Year	Title	US Pop	US R&B	US A/C	AUS	CAN	Certifications	Album
1969	"Grazing in the Grass"	3	5	—	98	5	RIAA: Gold	Grazin'
1969	"Going in Circles" (A-side)	15	3	—	—	24	RIAA: Gold	Grazin'
1969	"Let Yourself Go" (B-side)	63	—	—	—	34		Highly Distinct
1970	"Love or Let Me Be Lonely"	6	13	9	55	2		Real Friends
1970	"Time Waits for No One"	60	37	—	—	37		Whatever
1971	"I Need You"	79	28	—	—	—		Friends & People
1971	"Down I Go"	—	—	—	—	—		Friends & People
1971	"Let Me Be"	—	—	—	—	—		Friends & People
1972	"Love Is the Way of Life (The Humble Stranger)"	—	—	—	—	—		non-album track
1972	"Thumb Tripping (I'll Be Movin' On)"	—	—	—	—	—		Love Can Make It Easier
1973	"Easy Evil"	—	—	—	—	—		Love Can Make It Easier
1973	"Love Can Make It Easier"	—	—	—	—	—		Love Can Make It Easier
1975	"Honey Baby Theme"	—	—	—	—	—		Honey Baby, Honey Baby
1975	"Love Shack (Opened Up a Shop) Pt. 1"	—	—	—	—	—		Reviviscence – Live to Light Again
"—" denotes a recording that did not chart or was not released in that territory.
