= I Only Wanted You (song) =

Single by Marie Osmond

from the album I Only Wanted You
- B-side: "We're Gonna Need a Love Song"
- Released: December 27, 1986
- Genre: Country
- Length: 3:22
- Label: Capitol/Curb
- Songwriters: Tom Shapiro, Michael Garvin, Bucky Jones
- Producer: Paul Worley

Marie Osmond singles chronology
"You're Still New to Me" (1986)	"I Only Wanted You" (1986)	"Everybody's Crazy 'Bout My Baby" (1987)

"I Only Wanted You" is a song written by Tom Shapiro, Michael Garvin and Bucky Jones, and recorded by American country music artist Marie Osmond. It was released in December 1986 as the second single and title track from the album I Only Wanted You. The song reached number 14 on the Billboard Hot Country Singles & Tracks chart.

== Chart performance ==
Chart (1986–1987)	Peak position
US Hot Country Songs (Billboard)	14
Canadian RPM Country Tracks	19
