= Jessica Cleaves =

American singer and songwriter

- Born: December 10, 1948; Los Angeles, California, U.S.
- Died: May 2, 2014 (aged 65) Los Angeles, California, U.S.
- Genres: Soul; R&B; pop; funk
- Occupation: Singer
- Formerly of: The Friends of Distinction; Earth, Wind & Fire; Parliament-Funkadelic; Raw Silk

Jessica Marguerite Cleaves (December 10, 1948 – May 2, 2014) was an American singer and songwriter who was the lead singer of the Friends of Distinction, Earth, Wind & Fire, Parliament Funkadelic, and Raw Silk.

== Early life ==
Jessica Cleaves was born to Mary Gladys Cleaves (née Wilkerson), a librarian, and Lane C. Cleaves II, a US Postal employee. Cleaves' paternal grandfather, Lane C. Cleaves Sr., was Presiding Bishop over Phillips Temple, CME. Cleaves attended the California Institute of the Arts' School of Music and later studied at The University of California, Los Angeles. One of her classmates was the famed songwriter Skip Scarborough.

== Career ==
The Friends of Distinction was founded by Harry Elston and Floyd Butler, and beside Cleaves, it included Barbara Jean Love (plus Charlene Gibson, who replaced Love during her pregnancy).

During 1971, Cleaves became a member of the band Earth, Wind & Fire. She went on to appear on EWF's 1972 LP Last Days and Time and 1973 album Head to the Sky. After this album was released Cleaves quit EWF before founder Maurice White implemented his plans to fire her. Then Cleaves later moved to Detroit where she joined forces with George Clinton and Parliament-Funkadelic. Cleaves went on to appear on Funkadelic's 1976 album Tales of Kidd Funkadelic and 1979 LP Uncle Jam Wants You. She also sang on Parliament's 1979 album Gloryhallastoopid, 1980 LP Trombipulation and Funkadelic's 1981 album The Electric Spanking of War Babies. Cleaves later appeared on George Clinton's 1983 album Computer Games, his 1986 LP R&B Skeletons in the Closet and the P Funk All Stars' 1995 album Dope Dogs.

== Personal life ==
Cleaves died in Los Angeles, California, aged 65, following complications from a stroke. Her godson, director Armand Araujo, began filming Jessica Cleaves, My Friends of Distinction at the time of her death.
