= Paul Davis (singer) =

- Davis on the cover of his 1980 self-titled album

Background information
- Born: Paul Lavon Davis; April 21, 1948; Meridian, Mississippi, U.S.
- Died: April 22, 2008 (aged 60) Meridian, Mississippi, U.S.
- Genres: Blue-eyed soul; country rock; pop rock; soft rock
- Occupation: Singer-songwriter
- Instruments: Vocals; keyboards
- Years active: 1958–1988
- Labels: Bang; Arista

Paul Lavon Davis (April 21, 1948 – April 22, 2008) was an American singer and songwriter, best known for his radio hits and solo career that started worldwide in 1970. His career encompassed soul, country, and pop. His most successful songs are 1977's "I Go Crazy", a No. 7 pop hit that once held the record for the longest chart run on the Billboard Hot 100, and 1982's "'65 Love Affair", which at No. 6 is his highest-charting single. Another pop hit, "Cool Night", was released in 1981. In the mid-1980s, he also had two No. 1 country hits as a guest vocalist on songs by Marie Osmond and Tanya Tucker.

== Early life, family, and education ==
Davis was born in Meridian, Mississippi, US. His father was a preacher.

== Career ==
Paul Davis was a member of a local music group, the Six Soul Survivors, around 1966 and later in another group, the Endless Chain. In 1968, he was a writer for Malaco Records, based in Jackson, Mississippi. Ilene Berns, widow of Bert Berns, signed Davis to Bang Records in 1969, and in 1970, released a cover version of the Jarmels' hit "A Little Bit of Soap", reaching No. 52 on the Billboard Hot 100. His first album, A Little Bit of Paul Davis, was released in 1970. In 1974, he recorded his third album, Ride 'Em Cowboy, and the title track, his first top 40 single, peaked at No. 23 on January 18, 1975. (The same song became a Top 40 Country hit for Juice Newton in 1984.) Davis also reached No. 35 in September 1976 with "Superstar", a tribute song not related to any of the 1971 hits by that name.

Davis had his first American Top 10 single with the ballad "I Go Crazy", which after 30 weeks on the Hot 100 peaked at No. 7 on March 18, 1978. "I Go Crazy" spent 40 weeks on the Billboard Hot 100, which at the time set the record for most weeks on the chart. The follow-up, "Sweet Life", also did well, peaking at No. 17. On May 17, 1980, his gospel-tinged "Do Right" peaked at No. 23, and Casey Kasem noted the religious aspects of this song, along with other songs before it, on that day's edition of American Top 40. Davis was active on Bang Records when the label folded in the early 1980s.

After one more album on the Bang label, Davis signed with Arista Records in 1981 and scored two more hits, "Cool Night" (which in February 1982 reached No. 11 on the Hot 100 and No. 2 on the Adult Contemporary chart) and "'65 Love Affair" (a Top 10 hit on both charts). "Cool Night" has been listed as an example of yacht rock, and his songs are kept in regular rotation on stations such as YachtRockinRadio.com. His Arista debut album spawned a third hit with a remake of "Love or Let Me Be Lonely". The single contained a third verse of music which was not included on the album version, and despite its Top 40 and AC success, had never been reissued on any CD release until Wounded Bird reissued the Best of Paul Davis compilation in 2011. Despite his success during this time frame, Davis grew increasingly disillusioned with the industry. Davis retired from making records in 1983, except for two duets that went to No. 1 on the Billboard Hot Country Singles chart. The first was in 1986 with Marie Osmond singing "You're Still New to Me"; while the second, in 1988, was a collaboration with Tanya Tucker and Paul Overstreet singing "I Won't Take Less Than Your Love". Davis also wrote "Meet Me in Montana", which his friend Dan Seals and Osmond took to No. 1 on the Billboard country chart in 1985, and "Bop", a solo No. 1 country hit for Seals in early 1986. Davis left the music industry for good in 1988.

== Personal life and death ==
Davis was married to Pamela Gayle Jay Davis, who enjoyed a brief career with Bang Records/Web IV Music in Atlanta, where Davis wrote and recorded his songs. When their only son, Jonathan, was born with developmental problems, Pamela retired from the music world to care for him. She died on March 20, 2017.

Davis was an avid golfer, and billiards enthusiast.

Davis survived a shooting in Nashville, Tennessee, on July 29, 1986. He was leaving a hotel on Music Row with a female companion when an unidentified man approached, demanded his wallet, and shot him in the abdomen.

Davis died of a heart attack at the Rush Foundation Hospital in his hometown of Meridian, Mississippi, on April 22, 2008, just 1 day after his 60th birthday.

== Discography ==
=== Albums ===
Year	Album	Peak chart positions		
Year	Album	US	US Country	CAN
1970	A Little Bit of Paul Davis	—	—	—
1972	Paul Davis	—	—	—
1974	Ride 'Em Cowboy	148	19	—
1976	Southern Tracks & Fantasies	—	—	—
1977	Singer of Songs: Teller of Tales	82	—	77
1980	Paul Davis	173	—	—
1981	Cool Night	52	—	—

(NOTE: There are at least 6 compilations not listed.)

=== Singles ===
Year	Single	Peak chart positions							Album	Release date
Year	Single	US	US AC	US Country	CA	CA AC	AUS	NZ	Album	Release date
1970	"A Little Bit of Soap"	52	27	—	60	—	16	—	A Little Bit of Paul Davis	March 12, 1970
1970	"I Just Wanna Keep It Together"	51	34	—	58	—	47	—	A Little Bit of Paul Davis	August 21, 1970
1970	"Can't You"	118	—	—	—	—	—	—	Single only	November 20, 1970
1972	"Boogie Woogie Man"	68	—	—	—	—	—	—	Paul Davis	December 15, 1972
1974	"Ride 'Em Cowboy"	23	4	47	30	6	49		Ride 'Em Cowboy	September 26, 1974
1975	"Keep Our Love Alive"	90	—	—	—	—	—	—	Single only	May 13, 1975
1976	"Thinking of You"	45	31	—	—	—	—	—	Southern Tracks & Fantasies	March 23, 1976
1976	"Superstar"	35	31	—	53	—	—	—	Southern Tracks & Fantasies	August 11, 1976
1977	"I Go Crazy"	7	25	—	4	—	62	—	Singer of Songs – Teller of Tales	June 29, 1977
1978	"Darlin'" (with Susan Collins)	51	—	—	37	—	—	—	Singer of Songs – Teller of Tales	March 23, 1978
1978	"Sweet Life"	17	7	85	15	—	—	—	Singer of Songs – Teller of Tales	August 10, 1978
1980	"Do Right"	23	4	—	64	—	—	—	Paul Davis	March 11, 1980
1980	"Cry Just a Little"	78	36	—	—	—	—	—	Paul Davis	June 19, 1980
1981	"Cool Night"	11	2	—	34	—	78	23	Cool Night	October 28, 1981
1982	"'65 Love Affair"	6	5	—	11	—	71	13	Cool Night	February 22, 1982
1982	"Love or Let Me Be Lonely"	40	11	—	—	—	—	—	Cool Night	July 13, 1982

=== Guest singles ===
Year	Single	Artist	Peak positions		Album
Year	Single	Artist	US Country	CAN Country	Album
1986	"You're Still New to Me"	Marie Osmond	1	1	I Only Wanted You
1987	"I Won't Take Less Than Your Love"	Tanya Tucker (with Paul Overstreet)	1	10	Love Me Like You Used To
1987	"Sweet Life" (re-recording)	Marie Osmond	47	55	All in Love

=== Soundtrack appearances ===
Year	Song	Soundtrack	Additional information
1984	"(It Takes) Two to Tango"	The Karate Kid	–
1987	"If We Can Get Through the Night"	About Last Night...	–
