= Jerry Peters =

American songwriter and musician

- Born: Jerry Peters; New Orleans, Louisiana, U.S.
- Origin: Los Angeles, California, U.S.
- Genres: R&B, Jazz, Soul, Disco, Funk
- Occupation(s): Composer, Songwriter, Producer, Arranger, Pianist
- Instrument: Keyboards
- Years active: 1969–present
- Labels: Mercury Records

Jerry Peters is an American songwriter, record producer, multi-instrumentalist, conductor and arranger. He is best known for writing the hit songs "Love Or Let Me Be Lonely" and "Going In Circles" by The Friends of Distinction.

== Career ==
Peters was born in New Orleans, Louisiana, but was reared in Slidell, Louisiana. At the age of 14, Jerry moved to Los Angeles, California, where he attended Susan Miller Dorsey High School. Upon graduating he then attended Los Angeles City College as an art major, while continuing to take music classes. He then transferred to the California Institute of Arts but left school just short of getting his degree to enter the music business.

During his college years, Peters met Anita Poree and her brother Greg Poree. They started writing songs together. This collaboration between Jerry and Anita Poree would become the R&B pop classic "Going in Circles", which was performed by The Friends of Distinction. This became Peters' first gold record. Around this time Peters became an in-demand composer, songwriter, arranger, and producer.

In 1972, Peters recorded his only album on Mercury Records, Blueprint for Discovery. Also in 1972 Peters began his association with The Sylvers family. Working on all three of their Pride/MGM albums, producing The Sylvers II. He produced both Foster Sylvers albums.

Peters began producing albums by jazz pianist Gene Harris in 1975. A total of four were released by Blue Note Records. For the rest of the 1970s and well into the 1980s, Peters wrote songs for, produced projects and performed on recordings with some of the very best acts in the music business such as Earth, Wind & Fire, Aretha Franklin, Quincy Jones, Marvin Gaye, Natalie Cole, The Emotions, The Jacksons, Diana Ross, Deniece Williams, Gladys Knight, Al Green, Lionel Richie and many others. In 2011, Peters won his first Grammy for co-writing the "Gospel Song of the Year" with Kirk Whalum, "It's What I Do".

Peters is presently based in Los Angeles. Peters is a member of Phi Beta Sigma fraternity.

== Discography ==
=== Studio albums ===
Year	Album	Chart positions		Record label
Year	Album	US	US R&B	Record label
1972	Blueprint For Discovery	—	—	Mercury Records

=== As sideman ===
- Donald Byrd, Street Lady (Blue Note, 1973)
- Brass Fever, Time Is Running Out (Impulse!, 1976)
- Chico Hamilton, Peregrinations (Blue Note, 1975)
- Bobbi Humphrey, Blacks and Blues (Blue Note, 1973)
- Bobby Hutcherson, Linger Lane (Blue Note, 1975)
