= 2023 WhatsOnStage Awards =

British theatre awards

- Date: 12 February 2023
- Location: Prince of Wales Theatre
- Hosted by: Courtney Bowman, Laurie Kynaston and Billy Luke Nevers
- Most wins: My Neighbour Totoro (5)
- Most nominations: My Neighbour Totoro (9)

Television/radio coverage
- Network: BBC Radio 2

The WhatsOnStage Awards, founded in 2001 as the Theatregoers' Choice Awards, are a fan-driven set of awards organised by the theatre website WhatsOnStage.com, based on a popular vote recognising performers and productions of English theatre, with an emphasis on London's West End theatre.

The 2023 WhatsOnStage Awards, the 23rd iteration of the ceremony, took place on Sunday 12 February 2023 at the Prince of Wales Theatre. The ceremony is to feature several category changes from the 2022 WhatsOnStage Awards, retiring the eight acting awards (Best Actor in a Musical, Best Actress in a Musical, Best Actor in a Play and Best Actress in a Play, Best Supporting Actor in a Musical, Best Supporting Actress in a Musical, Best Supporting Actor in a Play and Best Supporting Actress in a Play) in favour of four gender-neutral categories. In addition, the Best Takeover Performance award was reinstated, having last been presented at the 2015 ceremony, and two new categories: Best Professional Debut Performance and Best Concert Event, were introduced. The ceremony will be hosted for the first time by Legally Blonde stars Courtney Bowman and Billy Luke Nevers and Spring Awakening star Laurie Kynaston.

The stage adaptation of Hayao Miyazaki's acclaimed film My Neighbour Totoro received the most nominations with nine, while the revival of Rodgers and Hammerstein's Oklahoma! was the most nominated musical, with eight. Due to the continued large volume of eligible productions, the number of nominees in each category remained at six, following an increase at the previous ceremony.

For plays, My Neighbor Totoro was the night's big winner, receiving five awards, while Oklahoma and Legally Blonde won two awards each, becoming the joint most successful musicals at the ceremony. Prima Facie was notable for winning all three of the categories in which it was nominated and was the only other show to receive multiple wins.

== Winners and nominees ==
The nominees for the 23rd WhatsOnStage Awards were announced on 8 December 2022 by As You Like It stars Leah Harvey and Alfred Enoch in a livestream from the green room @sohoplace.

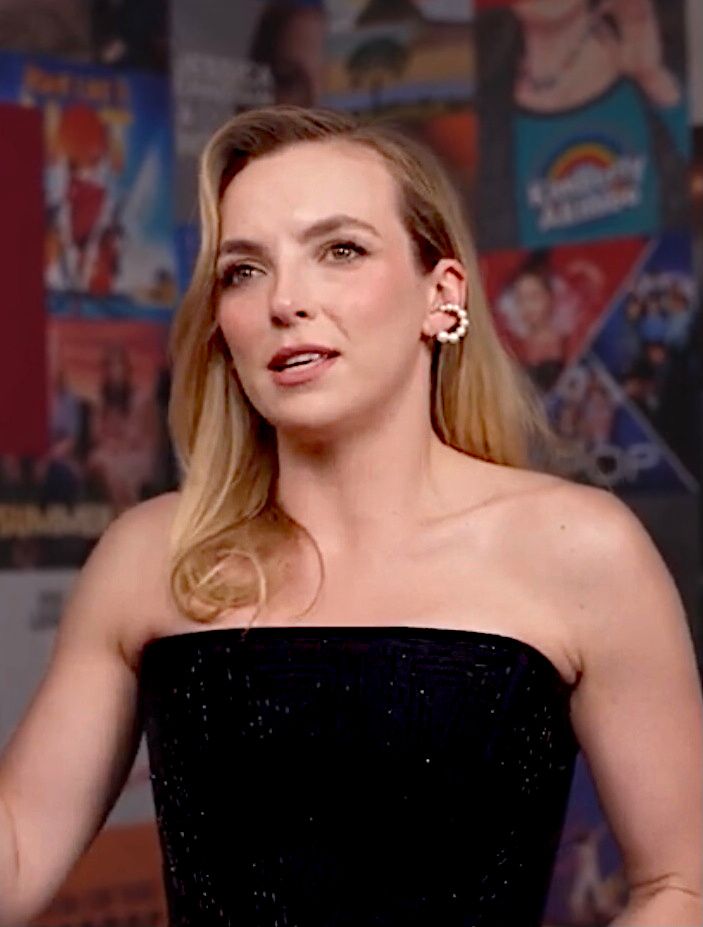
Jodie Comer won Best Performer in a Play for her role in the one-woman play Prima Facie.

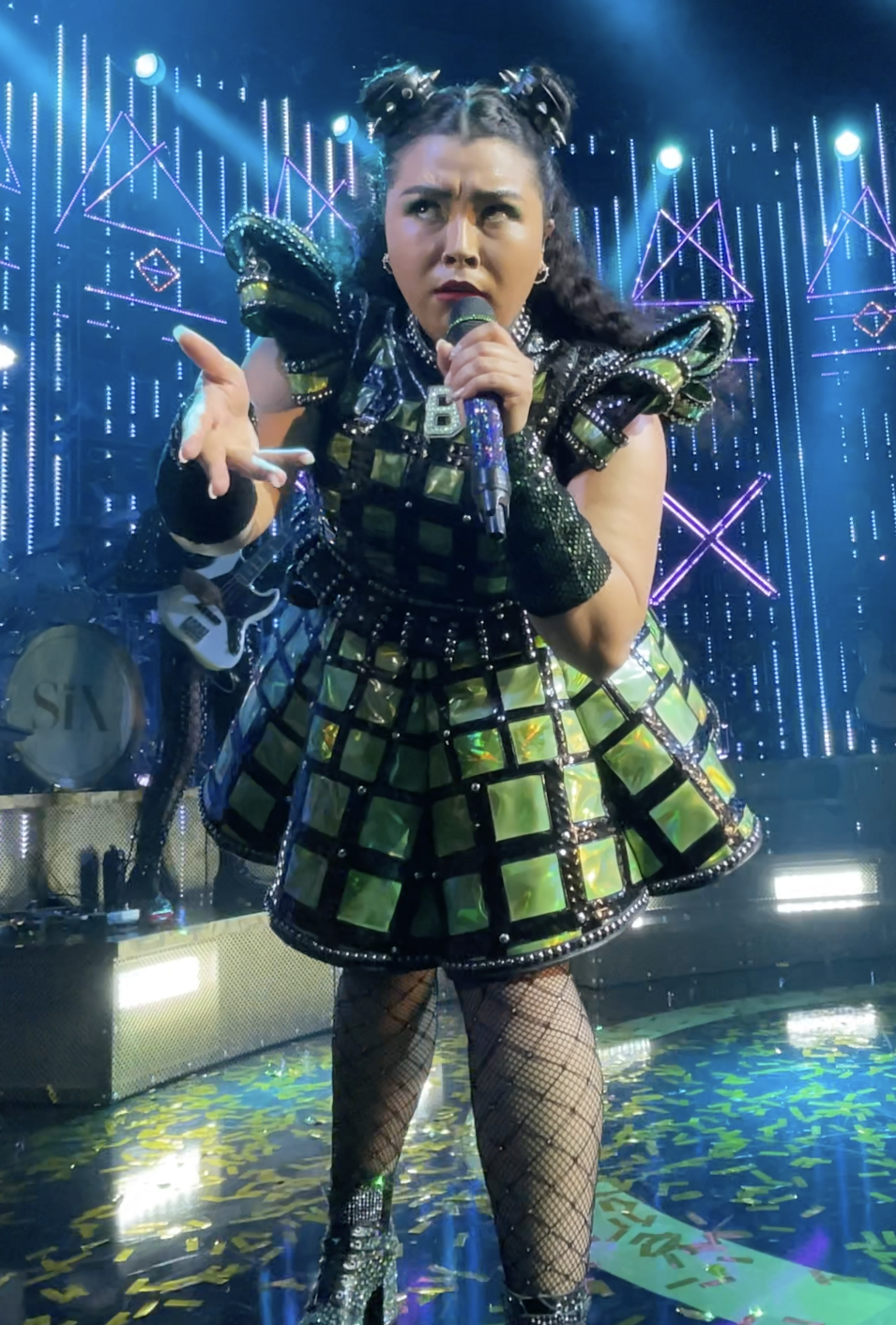
Host Courtney Bowman won Best Performer in a Musical for her starring role as Elle Woods in Legally Blonde.

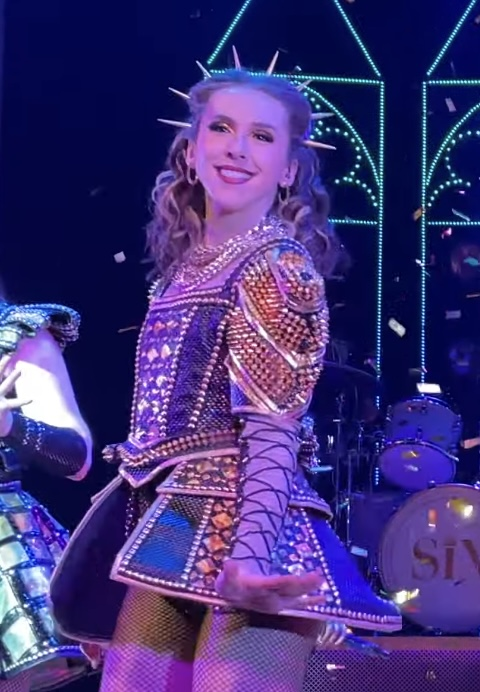
Lauren Drew won Best Supporting Performer in a Musical for her role in Legally Blonde.

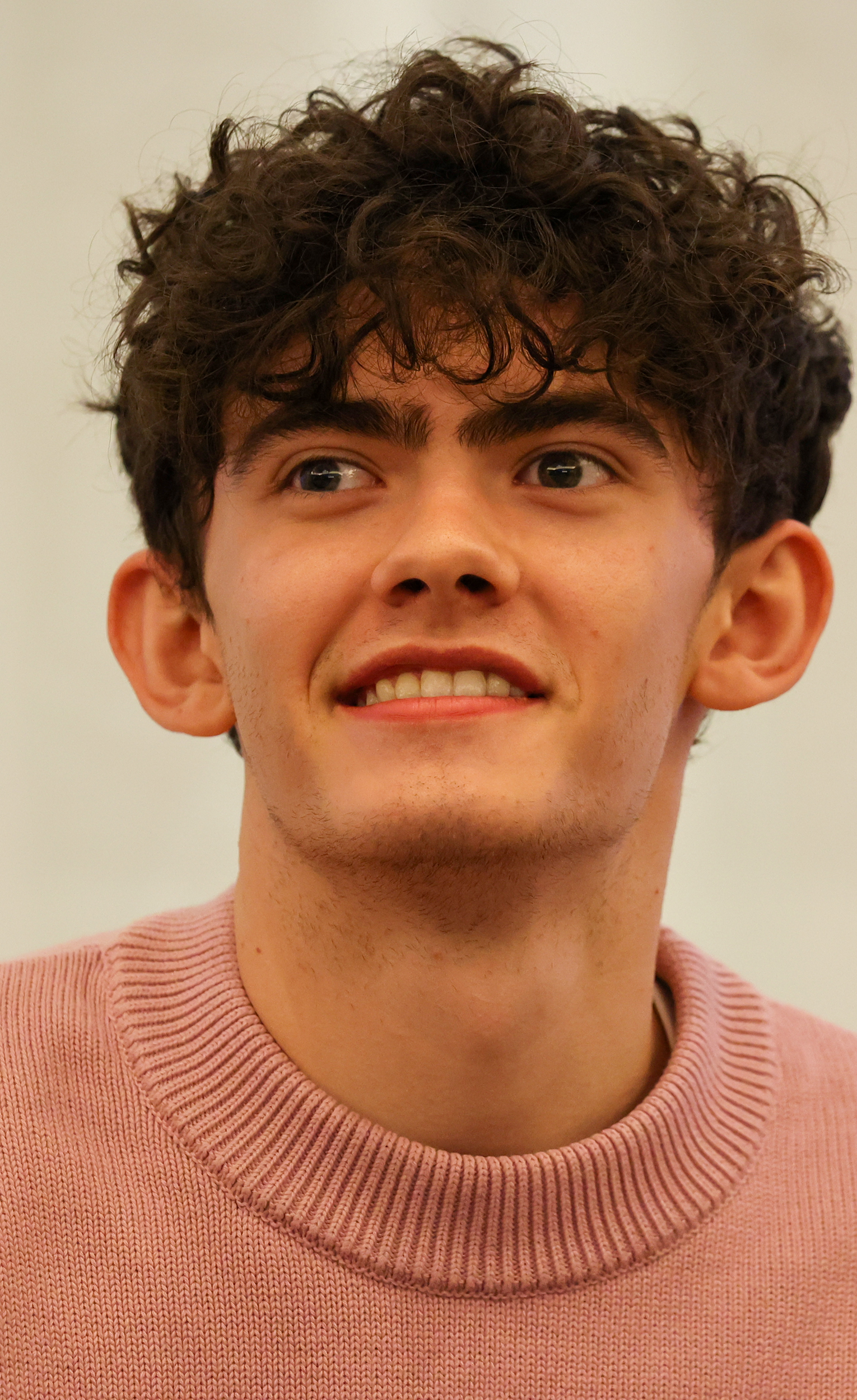
Joe Locke won Best Professional Debut Performance for his work in The Trials.

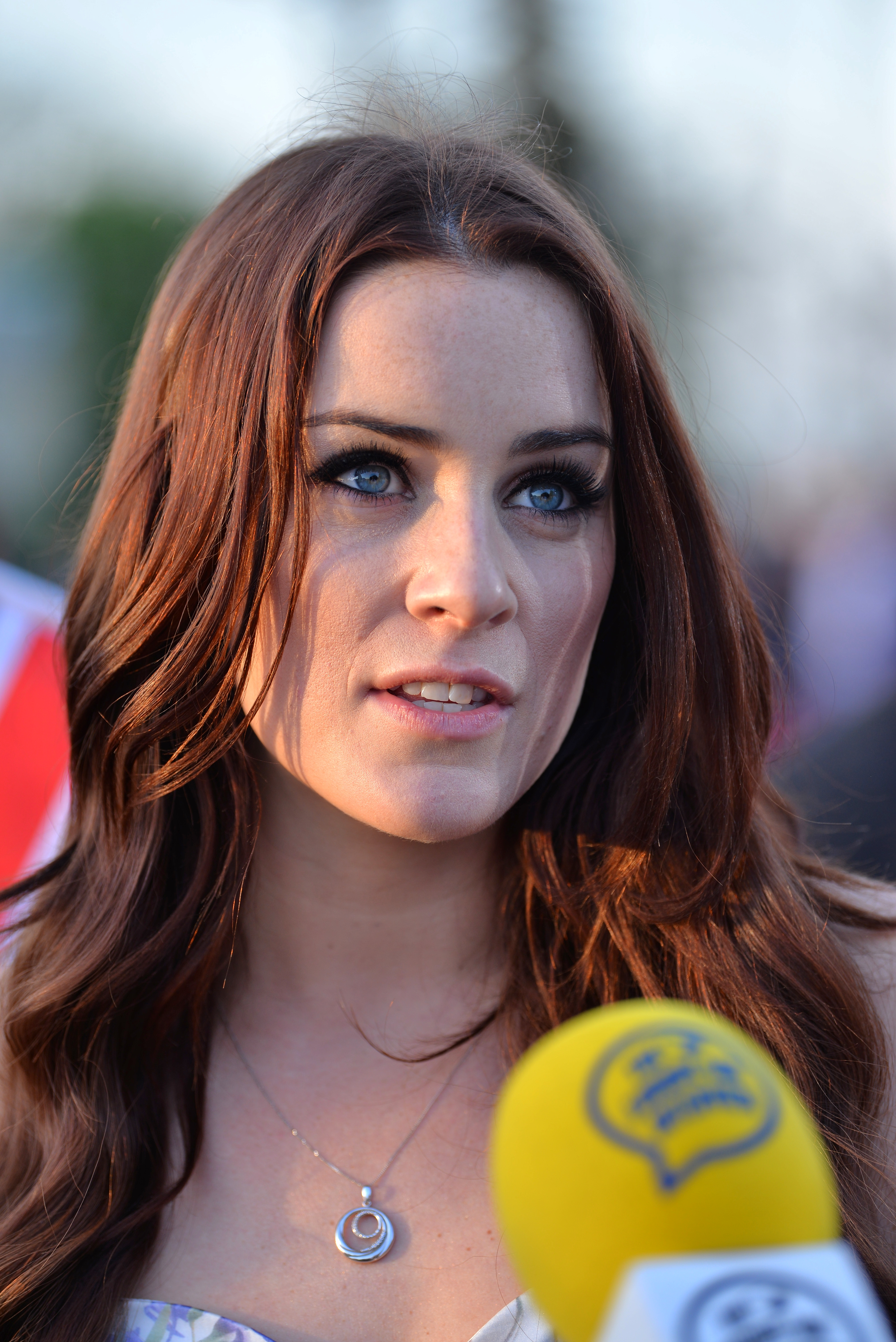
Lucie Jones won Best Takeover Performance for assuming the role of Elphaba in Wicked.

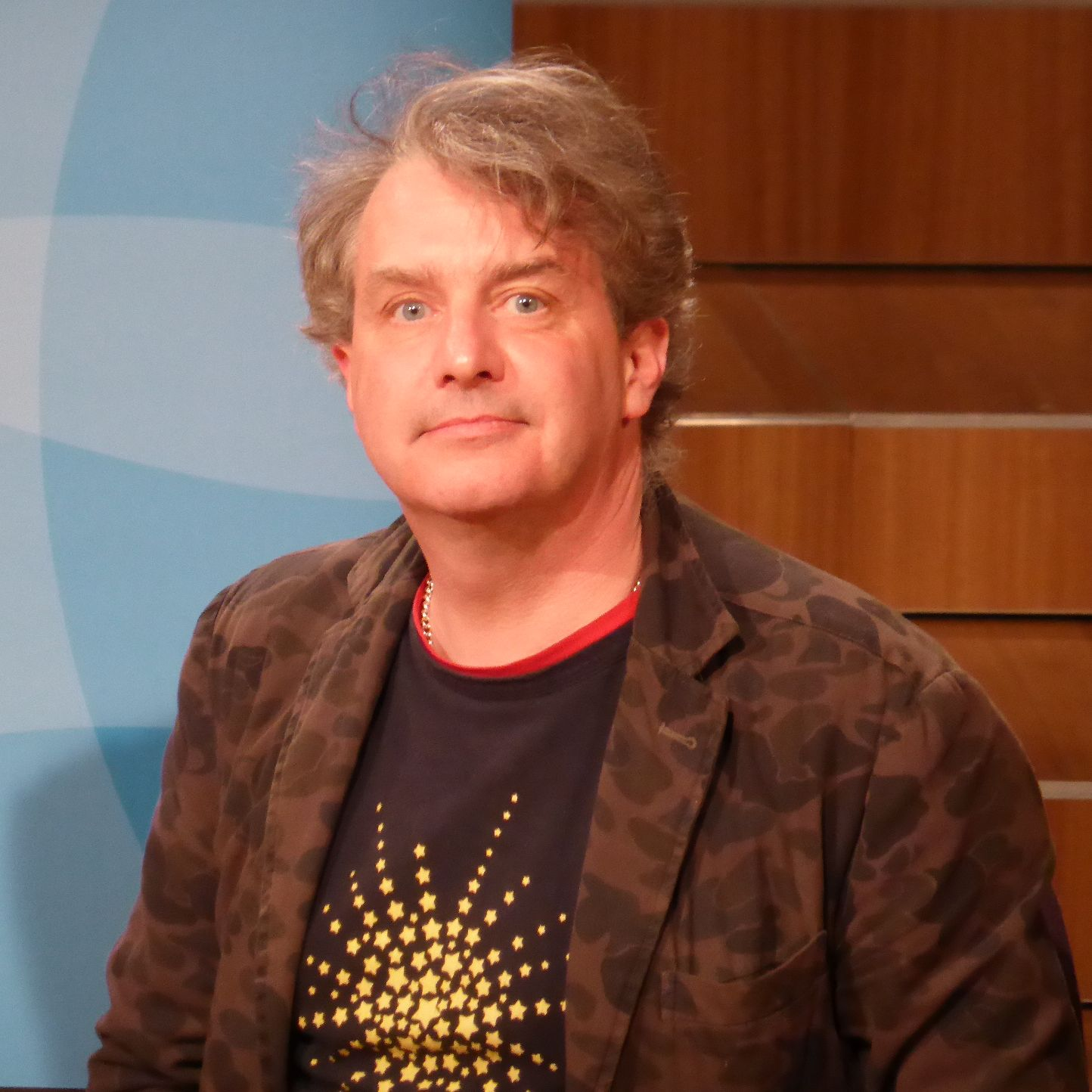
Phelim McDermott won Best Direction for My Neighbour Totoro.

Best New Play	Best New Musical
Prima Facie; A Different Stage; Best of Enemies; Eureka Day; My Neighbour Totoro; To Kill a Mockingbird	Bonnie & Clyde; The Great British Bake Off Musical; Identical; Tammy Faye; The Band's Visit; The Osmonds
Best Play Revival	Best Musical Revival
Cock; Blues for an Alabama Sky; Good; The Caucasian Chalk Circle; The Crucible; The Seagull	Oklahoma!; Billy Elliot; Grease; Legally Blonde; My Fair Lady; Spring Awakening
Best Performer in a Play	Best Supporting Performer in a Play
Jodie Comer for Prima Facie; Jonathan Bailey for Cock; Carrie Hope Fletcher for The Caucasian Chalk Circle; Mei Mac for My Neighbour Totoro; Rafe Spall for To Kill a Mockingbird; David Tennant for Good	Gwyneth Keyworth for To Kill a Mockingbird; Jade Anouka for Cock; Elliot Levey for Good; Natasha Magigi for The Clothes They Stood Up In; Sharon Small for Good; Greg Tannahill for Good Luck
Best Performer in a Musical	Best Supporting Performer in a Musical
Courtney Bowman for Legally Blonde; Katie Brayben for Tammy Faye; Divina de Campo for Hedwig and the Angry Inch; Jordan Luke Gage for Bonnie & Clyde; Frances Mayli McCann for Bonnie & Clyde; Charlie Stemp for Crazy for You	Lauren Drew for Legally Blonde; Jocasta Almgill for Grease; Paul French for Grease; Natalie McQueen for Bonnie & Clyde; John Owen-Jones for The Great British Bake Off Musical; Marisha Wallace for Oklahoma!
Best Takeover Performance	Best Professional Debut Performance
Lucie Jones for Wicked; Lauren Byrne for Matilda; Erin Caldwell for Heathers; Joel Harper-Jackson for Cock; Reuben Joseph for Hamilton; Ben Joyce for Back to the Future	Joe Locke for The Trials; Tomisin Ajani for The Play That Goes Wrong; Oliver Nicholas for Back to the Future; Aharon Rayner for The Great British Bake Off Musical; Nadine Shah for A Midsummer Night's Dream; Djavan van de Fliert for Frozen
Best Direction	Best Musical Direction/Supervision
Phelim McDermott for My Neighbour Totoro; Dominic Cooke for Good; Daniel Fish and Jordan Fein for Oklahoma!; Nikolai Foster for Billy Elliot; Rupert Goold for Spring Awakening; Indhu Rubasingham for The Father and the Assassin	Bruce O'Neil and Matt Smith for My Neighbour Totoro; Sarah Travis, Steve Sidwell and the company for Beautiful: The Carole King Musical; Daniel Kluger, Nathan Koci and Tom Brady for Oklahoma!; Stuart Morely, George Francis and Elliot Mackenzie for Whistle Down the Wind; Ted Sperling and Gareth Valentine for My Fair Lady
Best Choreography	Best Sound Design
Arlene Phillips for Grease; Fabian Aloise for Bring It On; Maxine Doyle for The Burnt City; Ellen Kane for A Chorus Line; Lynne Page for Spring Awakening; Susan Stroman for Crazy for You	Tony Gayle for My Neighbour Totoro; Neil Bettles for Blood Harmony; Paul Groothius for The Band's Visit; Adam Fisher for Into the Woods; Drew Levy for Oklahoma!; Annie May Fletcher for Hedwig and the Angry Inch
Best Set Design	Best Costume Design
Tom Pye and Basil Twist for My Neighbour Totoro; Jon Bausor for Into the Woods; Es Devlin for The Crucible; Robert Jones for Murder on the Orient Express; Morgan Large for Sister Act; Ben Stones for Hedwig and the Angry Inch	Gabriella Slade for The Cher Show; Evie Gurney and Richard Mawbey for Ben Stones; William Ivey Long for Crazy for You; Katrina Lindsay for Tammy Faye; Melissa Simon-Hartman for Much Ado About Nothing; Catherine Zuber for My Fair Lady
Best Lighting Design	Best Casting
Jessica Hung Han Yun for My Neighbour Totoro; Neil Austin for Tammy Faye; Nic Farman for The Book Thief; Jack Knowles for Spring Awakening; Tim Lutkin for The Crucible; Scott Zielinski for Oklahoma!	Pippa Ailion and Natalie Gallacher for Spring Awakening; Stuart Burt for The Seagull; Anji Carroll for The Marvellous; Natalie Gallacher for Legally Blonde; Jacob Sparrow for Oklahoma!; Anne Vosser and Jo Hawes for Identical
Best Video Design	Best Graphic Design
Joshua Thorson for Oklahoma!; Luke Halls and Zakk Hein for The Book of Dust: La Belle Sauvage; Douglas O'Connell for Identical; Finn Ross for Spring Awakening; Finn Ross and Andrea Scott for My Neighbour Totoro; Max Spielbichler for Best of Enemies	Prima Facie (Studio Doug); Tammy Faye (AKA); My Fair Lady (Bob King Creative); The Crucible (Felicity McCabe and the National Theatre Graphic Design Studio); The Book of Dust: La Belle Sauvage (Muse Communication); My Neighbour Totoro (Toshio Suzuki and Dewynters)
Best Off-West End Production	Best Regional Production
But I'm a Cheerleader; Anyone Can Whistle; DIVA: Live from Hell; Millennials; RIDE; Ruckus	Billy Elliot; Crazy for You; The Great British Bake Off Musical; Cinderella; The Book Thief; The Osmonds
Best Concert Event	Best West End Show
Stephen Sondheim's Old Friends; Chess; Jeremy Jordan at Hampton Court Palace; Six in Concert; Treason; The Witches of Eastwick	Six; Back to the Future; Hamilton; Les Misérables; The Phantom of the Opera; Wicked

== Productions with multiple wins and nominations ==
=== Multiple wins ===
- 5 wins: My Neighbour Totoro
- 3 wins: Prima Facie
- 2 wins: Legally Blonde, Oklahoma!

=== Multiple nominations ===
- 9 nominations: My Neighbour Totoro
- 8 nominations: Oklahoma!
- 6 nominations: Good, Spring Awakening
- 5 nominations: Tammy Faye
- 4 nominations: Bonnie & Clyde, Cock, Crazy for You, Legally Blonde, My Fair Lady, The Crucible, The Great British Bake Off Musical
- 3 nominations: Billy Elliot, Grease, Hedwig and the Angry Inch, Identical, Prima Facie, The Band's Visit, The Caucasian Chalk Circle, To Kill a Mockingbird
- 2 nominations: Back to the Future, Best of Enemies, Hamilton, Into the Woods, Six, The Book of Dust: La Belle Sauvage, The Book Thief, The Cher Show, The Osmonds, The Seagull, Wicked
