= Hotel Trubble =

- Title card used from Series 2 onwards, showing (l-r) Tanya Franks (Dolly), Dominique Moore (Sally), Sam Phillips (Jamie), Sheila Bernette (Mrs. Poshington) and Gary Damer (Lenny).
- Genre: Comedy drama
- Developed by: BBC; Film and General Productions Ltd
- Directed by: Natalie Bailey
- Starring: Dominique Moore; Sam Phillips; Gary Damer; Sheila Bernette; Tanya Franks (series 2–3); Susan Wokoma (series 3)
- Country of origin: United Kingdom
- Original language: English
- No. of series: 3
- No. of episodes: 39

Production
- Producer: John Pocock
- Production location: London
- Running time: 28 minutes

Original release
- Network: CBBC Channel
- Release: 24 December 2008 – 31 August 2011

Hotel Trubble is a British children's sitcom made by the BBC and broadcast on its flagship children and young person's channel CBBC. It stars Dominique Moore as Sally, the receptionist; Gary Damer as Lenny; Sam Phillips as Jamie, the bellboy; and Tanya Franks as Dolly and Sheila Bernette as Mrs. Poshington, a guest who never leaves (and who becomes the hotel's cleaner in series two and three). It is a farce sitcom. A total of 39 episodes have aired on TV between December 2008 and August 2011. Many guest stars appeared, including Tom Price, Josie d'Arby, Miranda Hart, Stephen Evans, Steve Furst, Steve Marsh, Dan Wright, Les Dennis, Phil Cornwell, and Susan Wokoma who played new regular Daisy in Series 3.

Reruns have not been broadcast on CBBC since late-2013.

== Characters ==
=== Jamie ===
Jamie (Sam Phillips) is the bellboy of Hotel Trubble and probably the one with the most common sense, he does at some parts, have a lack of confidence and panics. He also does embarrassing things when he is in a panic. He is always the first person to yell "Noooooo!" when its time to panic. He was also like Sally, nominated, but for being the best bellboy. He is sensitive, has strong emotions like the time Verity Lumiere kissed him. Jamie is a good character and always means well. He is probably the most normal of the threesome. It is shown on several occasions that he has romantic feelings for Sally – for example in "Super Trubble", he shouts "Don't hurt the woman I love!" after Lionel shoots her with an arrow, only to correct himself moments later. Sally and Jamie are technically married after an accident with a mix-up between a fake and real vicar. It's shown that Jamie is very over-enthusiastic about his work, as in one episode it is noted that he never wears anything other than his uniform; it can only be assumed he has a wardrobe somewhere full of identical blue suits.

=== Sally ===
Sally (Dominique Moore) is the receptionist of the hotel. She can be troublesome and often arrogant, but well-meaning, and is arguably the smartest out of the staff. Although glamorous, she finds life at the hotel dull, and prefers to read gossip magazines in spare time. She has shown an interest in acting and dancing, despite having no talent in either; her only role has been a sheep in her school's production of Cinderella. She and Jamie have shown an occasional attraction to one another - in one episode she displayed gratitude when he helps her out of a tight spot and flirted with him.

=== Lenny ===
Leonard "Lenny" Lemon, (Gary Damer) is the eccentric member of the trio, often serving as the comic relief. He is the most unintelligent out of the group, he regularly manages to mess up things for his mates, asking strange people for advice, and takes numerous directions and comments too literally. However, he is good-hearted and hard working; but this does not necessarily mean his efforts go to plan.

=== Dolly ===
Dolly (Tanya Franks) is Mr. Trubble's fiancée who first appeared in series two. A rich woman, she is effectively Hotel Trubble's manager, and is always coming up with odd business ideas including a toilet made out of flowers and hosting exclusive parties at the hotel. She is seen as rather dimwitted, and is clearly disliked by Mrs. Poshington, Jamie and Sally - Lenny gets on best with her due to their low common sense, often being roped into helping with her schemes. In series 3, it is discovered she used to be a successful singer in Japan, performing under the name "Yolly Dolly".

=== Mrs. Poshington ===
Mrs. Poshington (Sheila Bernette) is a guest, who literally never leaves. Every morning she asks pointless questions and she claims to be a marathon runner, running the London Marathon 30 years ago (in 2009) even though it was established in 1981, the Queen's cousin once removed, a former actress and a grandmother. In a few episodes, she helps Sally, Lenny and Jamie with solutions to their problems. Mrs. Poshington seems to be demanding, but kind-hearted and filled with willpower. She loses her entire fortune in series 2 and is allowed to stay at the hotel as long as she is the new cleaner. In "Time Trubble", it is revealed she's had eight husbands; all of which died in suspicious circumstances. Mrs. Poshington is not a great cleaner as it shows in episodes 13 (4011); her video shows her breaking various items.

=== General Sirius Poshington ===
General Sirius Poshington is a stuffed cat belonging to Mrs. Poshington. She does not seem to realize that he is not real and she pushes him on a wagon. Mrs Poshington says things like "Sirius doesn't like running, he likes the cycling trips we go on together". She even asks Sally to look after him for her when she goes out and calls frequently during this period to ask how he is in series 1 and 2. In "Fashion Phonies", Jamie says Sirius will never walk again.

=== Mr. Trubble ===
Mr. Trubble owns Hotel Trubble and calls very often on a special red phone with a siren instead of a bell or tone caller. Once, he threatens to fire Sally, Jamie and Lenny if they don't give him a good birthday party. Mrs. Poshington is responsible and is told that she will lose her room if the party isn't good. In one episode the Trubble diamond is brought in by an impostor who tries to steal it. He first tries to accuse Sally and then Lenny. Mr. Trubble does not have a particular personality as he is never shown and is heard only as a shouting, unintelligible voice over the phone, a la the General in the Hanna-Barbera cartoon series Dastardly and Muttley in Their Flying Machines.

=== Chef ===
Like Mr. Trubble, Chef is never seen and is represented only as a shouting unintelligible voice emanating from behind the double doors leading to the kitchen. He would seem to be an extremely hostile individual, as whenever Jamie or Lenny enters the kitchen to speak to him, there is always a lot of shouting before they emerge looking rather frightened or covered in something. He is French.

=== Daisy ===
Daisy is the new receptionist, first appearing in the series 3 episode "American President". She is an animal rights activist who has kidnapped an elephant from London Zoo, and is on the run from the police. Daisy is plotting to smuggle the elephant, which she has named Trunky and has hidden in room 360, back to the jungle where the two of them can start a new life together. She states that Sally found out her secret, therefore prompting her to kidnap Sally and post her to Guatemala so she would not be found out. The rest of the characters are unaware of all of this, despite regular elephant noises coming from room 360. In "Fashion Phonies", the characters receive a postcard from Sally in Guatemala saying "DON'T TRUST THE RECEPTIONIST!", but Daisy tells them it's actually Guatemalan for "Ahh, lovely time".
Note: The character of Daisy, played by Susan Wokoma, was introduced when Dominique Moore had to leave the show during recording of series 3 to have treatment for Hodgkin's Lymphoma. The scripts were rewritten so Sally would not have to appear, though she would still be referred to in dialogue, incorporating the underlying sub-plot of Daisy having kidnapped an elephant and Sally's absence being explained by her having been sent to Guatemala by Daisy.

== Episodes ==
=== Series overview ===
Series	Episodes	Originally released	
Series	Episodes	First released	Last released
1	13	24 December 2008	24 February 2009
2	13	20 September 2010	13 December 2010
3	13	15 August 2011	31 August 2011

=== Series 1 (2008–09) ===
No. overall	No. in series	Title	Original release date
1	1	"Royal Trubble"	24 December 2008
A Royal imposter makes impossible demands, and the hopeless staff hold it together with help from the unsuspecting public. Guest stars: Tom Price as Prince Wally, Stephen Bent as Mr Dance and Joe Mace as Newsreader
2	2	"Verity Lumiere"	25 December 2008
Film star Verity Lumiere comes to stay at the hotel to prepare for her new film. Can receptionist Sally keep her temper long enough to win herself a part? Guest Star: Josie d'Arby as Verity Lumiere
3	3	"Fired!"	28 December 2008
Sir Alan Sugarfree arrives to streamline the hotel and make it more efficient, Apprentice style. Guest stars: Alex Lowe as Sir Alan Sugarfree and Amanda Bellamy as Margaret
4	4	"Tall Tales"	29 December 2008
Lenny is in trouble when his mother decides to pay him a visit at work, as he has told her that he is the manager of the hotel. Will the team manage to convince her that he is in charge? Guest star: Miranda Hart as Mrs. Lilly Lemon
5	5	"Spies Like Us"	30 December 2008
When Mr Trubble entrusts a diamond to the hotel safe, a thief poses as a spy to try to steal it Guest star: Steve Furst as Agent Agent
6	6	"Demolition Day"	31 December 2008
Two excitable demolition thugs inform Jamie the hotel is being knocked down, so the staff attempt to raise money for an appeal to keep it open Guest stars: Dan Wright as Mr. Wreck, Steve Marsh as Mr. Ball, Joe Mace as Newsreader and Natalie Bailey as Cheatem and Co. Lawyer
7	7	"The Amazing Armando"	1 January 2009
When celebrity magician The Amazing Armando comes to stay at the hotel, Lenny accidentally makes his glamorous assistant vanish. Will the show go off without a hitch? Guest star: Les Dennis as The Amazing Armando
8	8	"High Trubble Musical"	2 January 2009
The staff must put on a fabulous performance for Mr. Trubble's birthday in this High School Musical spoof.
9	9	"X Marks The Spot"	27 January 2009
The adventurer Dr. Windy Banana Bones comes to relax and rest at Hotel Trubble, but instead finds buried treasure and an all-too-familiar villain. Guest stars: Phil Gallagher as Dr. Windy Banana Bones and Dan Wiltshire as Herr Style
10	10	"Monkey Business"	3 February 2009
Celebrity gorilla Lionel disappears during his stay at the hotel. The staff try to find him without letting anyone know he is missing. Guest stars: Oliver Parham as Lionel, Laurence Hobbs as Mr Sslyth and Joe Mace as Newsreader.
11	11	"A Sistery Mystery"	10 February 2009
When a menace keeps playing pranks around the hotel, could two mysterious nuns have anything to do with it? Guest stars: Arabella Weir as Sister Matic and Phil Cornwell as Sister Deryk
12	12	"Fright Knight"	17 February 2009
The staff people try to attract the attention of famous ghost-hunter Egon Pantz with their hotel ghost, and get themselves on Most Haunted Live. Guest stars: Laurence Howarth as Dr. Egon Pantz
13	13	"Dribble Versus Trubble"	24 February 2009
The evil staff of Hotel Dribble run a dastardly campaign to put Hotel Trubble out of business. Can Jamie, Sally and the others save the day? This episode features the regular cast members in dual roles.

=== Series 2 (2010) ===
No. overall	No. in series	Title	Original release date
14	1	"Hello Dolly"	20 September 2010
The Hotel Trubble heating has packed up and the staff are freezing, so something has to be done. Meanwhile, a mysterious guest arrives at the hotel claiming to be Mr. Trubble's fiancee. Tanya Franks makes her first appearance as Dolly. Guest stars: Andrew Brooke and Alan Ford
15	2	"An Inspector Calls"	27 September 2010
A hotel inspector is on her way. On her last visit she found 536 things wrong with the hotel. Things had better improve, otherwise the staff are up for the chop. Guest star: Pippa Haywood
16	3	"Football Fever"	4 October 2010
England's star footballer Dwayne Looney checks into Hotel Trubble and refuses to play in England's crucial game... only Sally can save the day! Guest stars: Colin Hoult and Norman Pace
17	4	"Love Conkers All"	11 October 2010
Jamie is alarmed to hear that Hotel Trubble is holding the World Conker Championship, once again Sally has forgotten to pass over the message. How will he cope with arch rivals Boris 'The Bear' Bolshieman and Louie 'The Lip' Lipinski? Guest stars: Steven Wickham and Thomas Nelstrop
18	5	"Catz N Doggz"	18 October 2010
Rap star Z-Dogg is coming to stay at Hotel Trubble, and all the staff are star-struck. Jamie insists they should treat him like any other guest; that is, until he meets him. Guest stars: Javone Prince, Alex Macqueen and Gemma Hunt
19	6	"Fangs For the Memories"	25 October 2010
Lenny is convinced vampires are real and that there is one staying at Hotel Trubble. To make matters worse, Mrs. Poshington has fallen in love with him. Dolly has yet another scheme to try to improve business. Guest star: Vincent Ebrahim
20	7	"When Hally Met Sally"	1 November 2010
Sally's old school rival Hally arrives and soon starts bossing everyone around; Sally has to do something before Hally takes over the hotel. Guest star: Sara Alexander
21	8	"Strictly Come Prancing"	8 November 2010
Peak-time show Strictly Come Prancing comes to Hotel Trubble with star performer Darren Chiseljaw - and Lenny and Sally are hiding a dance-related secrets. Guest stars: Helen Lederer, Ed Weeks and Miri Katz
22	9	"Lenny The Hero"	15 November 2010
Lenny feels he is being overlooked at the hotel, until news anchorman Ed Flaxman arrives at the hotel and turns him into a tabloid sensation. Guest star: Alexander Kirk
23	10	"Trubble Billionaire"	22 November 2010
Hotel Trubble has a mould problem, and will be closed down unless the staff can raise the money to get it fixed. An eccentric guest arrives at the hotel who could save the day, but Mrs. Poshington must go on a date with him first. Guest star: Michael Fenton Stevens
24	11	"Bridezilla"	29 November 2010
Love is in the air at Hotel Trubble. Dolly is sure Mr. Trubble is going to propose, and has entered the Wedding of the Year competition. Can the staff put on a spectacular wedding and win the massive cash prize? Guest stars: Dominic Coleman, Dan Tetsell and Ian Conningham
25	12	"Smash in the Attic"	6 December 2010
TV antiques expert David Dickydoodle is at the hotel, and Jamie thinks the hotel has some valuable antiques, while Dolly and Sally are keen to impress the TV expert for their own ends. Guest star: Paul Antony-Barber
26	13	"Hotel Trubble 1900"	13 December 2010
The year is 1900, and Hotel Trubble is opening its doors for the very first time. There is just one problem - they have no guests! However, a mysterious stranger arrives to give the staff some good fortune.

=== Series 3 (2011) ===
No. overall	No. in series	Title	Original release date
27	1	"An Unconventional Convention"	15 August 2011
Excited about a new film, Outer Space Aliens from Outer Space, Lenny and Jamie persuade Dolly to host a sci-fi convention at the hotel. The arrival of sci-fi nerds in costume results in the staff completely missing the arrival of a real alien - a demanding Splurgian warrior who will stop at nothing to get hold of some precious power minerals. Guest star: Marek Larwood
28	2	"Dragon's Den"	16 August 2011
The gang are ecstatic when fearsome businessman Duncan Banana-Time agrees to film the final of his famous TV show at the hotel - as long as nothing annoys him in any way. Unfortunately, a very irritating autograph hunter checks in.
29	3	"The Musical"	17 August 2011
Jamie decides to stage a Hotel Trubble Musical and then does not cast Dolly in a lead role. Fuming, Dolly blows the hotel emergency fund on employing Lord Andrew Lloyd-Blubber to put on a rival show. Will the staff fall out permanently or will Lenny's song, Fingers in your Face, save the day?
30	4	"Takahashi"	18 August 2011
Mr. Takahashi, an extremely rude businessman, comes to stay but Jamie is sure he is actually a Hotel of the Year mystery judge and bends over backwards trying to keep him happy. However, it is actually Dolly, and her mysterious past, that makes Mr. Takahashi's day.
31	5	"Super Trubble"	19 August 2011
Mr. Trubble pits the branches of Hotel Trubble against one another in a webcam competition to find the most boring branch and shut it down. So, it is the worst possible time for Dolly to hold the World's Dullest Person competition. Can Lenny's obsession with superheroes save the day?
32	6	"Snoopergirl"	22 August 2011
Receptionist Sally has been revealing the secrets of the hotel's celebrity guests on her Snoopergirl blog. When top US popstar Jenny Montenny comes to stay, Dolly and Jamie join forces to prevent Sally discovering the secret the singer is hiding.
33	7	"Offensive"	23 August 2011
Mr Trubble's fearsome Auntie Phyllis is coming to stay in order to size up whether Dolly is a suitable girlfriend for her beloved nephew. Everyone has to be on their best behaviour - so it is the worst possible time for outrageous popstar Lady Gaahouse to turn up.
34	8	"Bell Boy Bot"	24 August 2011
Determined to win a HIYA, Hotel Improvement Award, Dolly buys a swish new Bellboybot 2000. Jamie is suspicious of the new arrival, but the rest of the staff think he is just jealous. Can Jamie save his unsuspecting friends from the robot's evil plans for hotel domination?
35	9	"American President"	25 August 2011
The American President secretly checks into Hotel Trubble, relying for his safety on the fact that no one will look for him at such a rubbish, cheap fleapit. When he gets locked in the toilet, leaving Lenny looking after a laptop that will enact any law he chooses, things start to get seriously silly. Susan Wokoma makes her first appearance as Daisy. Note: Due to Dominique Moore leaving the show to have treatment for Hodgkin's Lymphoma, Sally was replaced by Susan Wokoma as Daisy as part of an underlying sub-plot involving a kidnapped elephant to cover her absence. However, Sally is still mentioned in this and every subsequent episode of series 3.
36	10	"Fashion Phonies"	26 August 2011
It is the Best Dressed Hotel Staff Awards and this year the staff are determined to win. They are also just as determined to get rid of the troop of ramblers, sheep and farmers currently using the public footpath that Lenny has allowed to go through the hotel. Can they convince expert Thingy that they are the most stylish staff in the land?
37	11	"Time Trubble"	29 August 2011
After the Wacky Inventors Convention leave behind a time machine, Jamie finds himself running from the Normans in Ye Olde Hotel Trubble. In the modern-day hotel, Henry VIII is on the prowl for another wife, or three, to add to his collection.
38	12	"Britain's Most Boring Bellboy"	30 August 2011
TV presenter Barney Harwood arrives to make a programme about bellboys. Jamie's ecstatic, until he finds out Barney's making a show called Britain's Most Boring Bellboys. Can Jamie prove he's too exciting to be on Barney's hotel-wrecking show? Guest star: Barney Harwood as himself
39	13	"Trubble 4011"	31 August 2011
In the year 4011, Hotel Trubble spins in near-Earth orbit. Dolly has been reduced to just a head due to a dodgy body transplant operation, Jamie is still the bell-boy (will he ever get his promotion to manager?), Lenny and Mrs. Poshington are robots, Sally is conspicuous by her absence and Mr. Trubble still hasn't visited. Everyone is bored until the mysterious Salgar turns up to give a presentation on Hotel Management – reminding them what fun they used to have in the olden days. Guest star: Matthew Earley.
