= Courtney Bowman =

English stage actress and singer (born 1995)

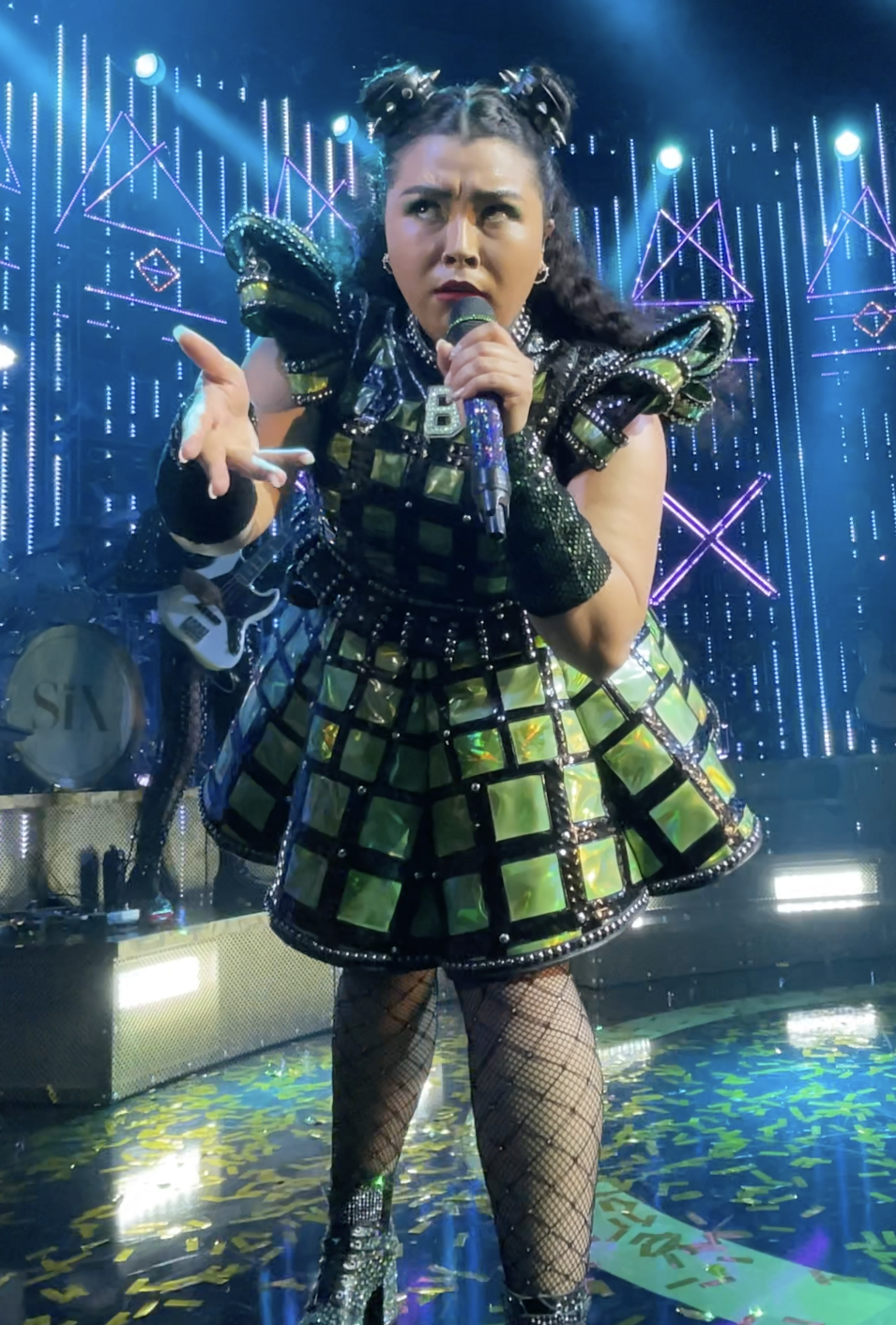
- Bowman performing in Six in May 2021 at the Lyric Theatre
- Born: 1 February 1995 (age 31); Boston, Lincolnshire, England
- Education: Guildford School of Acting
- Occupations: Actress; singer
- Years active: 2016–present

Signature
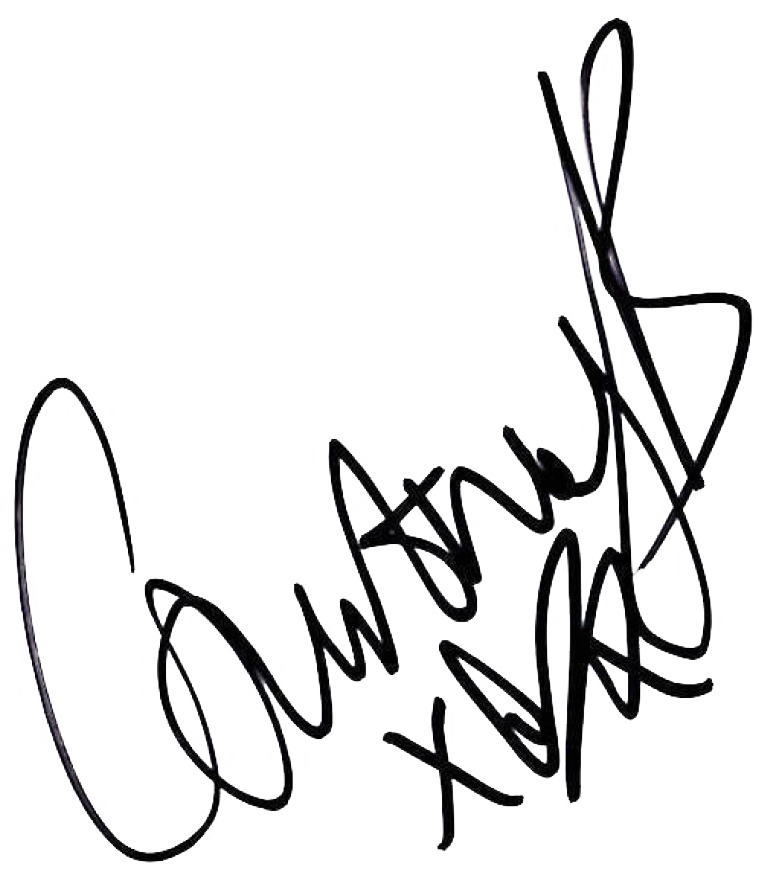

Courtney Bowman (born 1 February 1995) is an English stage actress and singer. She originated the role of Fatimah in Everybody's Talking About Jamie at the Crucible and Apollo Theatre. She played Anne Boleyn in Six at the Arts Theatre, Lyric Theatre and Vaudeville Theatre and Elle Woods in Legally Blonde at the Regent's Park Open Air Theatre. Bowman is currently starring as Lauren in the UK & European Tour of Kinky Boots.

On television, she appears in the CBeebies revival of Big Cook, Little Cook (2022) as Little Cook Small.

== Early life ==
Bowman was born and raised in Boston, Lincolnshire, England. She is dual-heritage, being half Cape Verdean and describes herself as Afro-European. Bowman attended Boston High School from eleven to eighteen. She then went on to train at the Guildford School of Acting for three years until she graduated in 2016. Bowman also performed at the 10th annual Stephen Sondheim Society Student Performer of the Year competition held at the Novello Theatre on 15 May 2016, she won the award and £1,000 after performing “Me and My Town” from Anyone Can Whistle and “The Driving Lesson” from Heart of Winter by Tim Connor.

== Career ==
Bowman performed at both Josh Groban on Stage in 2015 as a chorister and at Sam Bailey's 2016 concert Sam Bailey: In Concert as a soloist.

She is currently a client of Belfield & Ward Talent Agency.

In November 2016, Bowman was announced as part of the original cast of Everybody's Talking About Jamie playing at the Crucible Theatre, Sheffield during its original string of performances the following year. It was announced in late-June 2017 that Bowman would return in the same role for its West End transfer in late 2017 following its successful run in Sheffield.

Whilst performing the role of Fatimah in Everybody's Talking About Jamie at the Apollo Theatre, a professionally filmed version of the musical, featuring Bowman, was broadcast into more than 600 cinemas worldwide. It was initially administered by entertainment event cinema distributor More 2 Screen on 5 July 2018, while encore screenings took place on 29 January and 13 June 2019.

In June 2019, it was announced via Pearson Casting, that alongside Danielle Steers, Bowman would join the cast of Six on 15 October 2019.

From 2019 to 2021, Bowman played Anne Boleyn as part of the principal cast of the West End production of Six. Bowman returned to Six when it opened at the Lyric Theatre after having closed for the COVID-19 pandemic. From late September 2021, she moved to the Vaudeville Theatre where she would complete her Six run; her final performance took place on 14 November 2021.

Bowman performed a solo concert at Pizza Express, Holborn on 15 March 2020 and a socially distanced recorded concert at the Arts Theatre on 7 September 2020. She also appeared in two drive-in concerts, a collaborative concert at the Turbine Theatre within the Battersea Power Station complex, and a charity concert at the Actor's Church, Covent Garden. In April 2021, Bowman portrayed Princess Badroulbadour in an online production of Disenchanted!, produced by stream.theatre.

In mid-February 2022, it was announced Bowman would star in a 50 episode revival series of the pre-school cookery show Big Cook, Little Cook as Little Cook Small on CBeebies, airing daily from 28 February 2022. In March 2022, it was announced exclusively via WhatsOnStage that Bowman would portray the leading role of Elle Woods in the revival of Legally Blonde at Regent's Park Open Air Theatre. In an interview with The Independent she recounts how the production is distinct from other iterations of the musical, citing subtle differences to the script and lyrics in order for the production to align itself with the present day. She also starred in a revival concert version of Kinky Boots at the Theatre Royal, Drury Lane in August 2022, portraying the role of Lauren. In late-September it was revealed Bowman would be attending the first-ever MusicalCon fan convention taking place at London's ExCel Centre on 22–23 October 2022. It was announced in October 2022 via the Olivier Awards social channels, that Bowman would host the annual UK Theatre Awards at the Guildhall, London that same month on 23 October 2022.

It was announced by Ambassador Theatre Group Productions in late-October 2022, that Bowman would portray the supporting role of Kit de Luca in the West End production of Pretty Woman: The Musical playing at the Savoy Theatre from mid-November 2022.

Bowman hosted the 2023 WhatsOnStage Awards alongside Laurie Kynaston and her Legally Blonde co-star Billy Luke Nevers on 12 February 2023 at the Prince of Wales Theatre. That evening, she also won the first gender-neutral WhatsOnStage Award for Best Performer in a Musical for her performance as Elle Woods in Legally Blonde at Regent's Park Open Air Theatre. In her speech, she thanked her mother, best friend and cast of Legally Blonde.

In September 2023, it was announced Courtney would star in Canterbury's annual pantomime, a production of Aladdin, playing at the Marlowe Theatre as the Spirit of the Ring. This ran from November 2023 to January 2024, and earnt Bowman a nomination for 'Best Magical Being' at The Pantomime Awards, in association with Stagecoach.

In April 2024, Courtney took part in the 10th anniversary concert of the musical Cool Rider at The London Palladium, adapted from the 1982 film Grease 2, and portrayed the role of Sharon.

It was announced in September 2024 that Courtney would portray the role of Lauren in Kinky Boots on the UK and European Tour. A role she had previously performed for one night only at a concert presentation of the musical at the Theatre Royal, Drury Lane. This production transferred to the West End at the London Coliseum from March to July 2026 with Bowman reprising her role.

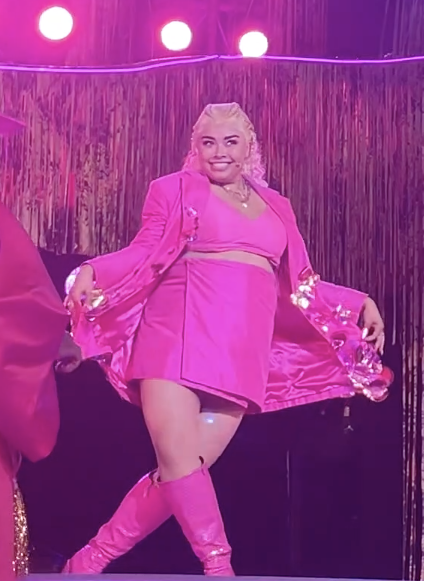
Bowman pictured as Elle Woods in Legally Blonde at Regent's Park Open Air Theatre in June 2022

== Stage ==
Year	Production	Role	Venue	Ref
2016	The Wind in the Willows	Horse/Ensemble	Theatre Royal, Plymouth / UK Tour	
2017	Blondel	Martha	Union Theatre, London	
2017-2019	Everybody's Talking About Jamie	Fatimah / Cover Pritti Pasha	Crucible Theatre / Apollo Theatre	
2019-2021	Six	Anne Boleyn	Arts Theatre / Lyric Theatre / Vaudeville Theatre	
2022	Legally Blonde	Elle Woods	Regent's Park Open Air Theatre	
2022–2023	Pretty Woman	Kit De Luca	Savoy Theatre	
2023–2024	Aladdin	Spirit of the Ring	Marlowe Theatre	
2024	Closer To Heaven	Shell Christian	The Turbine Theatre	
2025-2026	Kinky Boots	Lauren	UK & European Tour / London Coliseum	

== Filmography ==
=== Television ===
Year	Title	Role	Broadcasting Channel	Ref
2018	Olivier Awards 2018	Fatima	ITV	
2018	Children In Need 2018	Fatima	BBC One	
2019	Musical Sing-a-Long 2019	Fatima	AVROTROS	
2021	Musicals: The Greatest Show	Anne Boleyn	BBC One	
2021	This Morning	Anne Boleyn	ITV	
2022	Big Cook, Little Cook	Little Cook Small	CBeebies	
2023	EastEnders	Yasmin	BBC One	

=== Radio ===
Year	Title	Role	Radio Station	Ref
2020	WhatsOnStage Awards 2020 with Elaine Paige and Paddy O’Connell	Herself	BBC Radio 2	
2020	Magic With The Musicals LIVE	Anne Boleyn	Magic FM	
2021	Musicals: The Greatest Show	Anne Boleyn	BBC Radio 2	

=== Podcast ===
Year	Title	Episode	Role	Presenter	Ref
2020	The Queendom Podcast	20	Herself	Josh Mitchell	
2021	Now Or Nevers	1	Herself	Billy Luke Nevers	
2022	In The Frame	6 (Season 7)	Herself	Andrew Tomlins	
2023	The Mayor of Musical Theatre	3	Herself	Ian Bowkett	
2023	Robbie's Backstage Bants	59	Herself	Robbie Davies	
2024	Call to Stage (formerly Your 5 Minute Call)	15	Herself	Amber Davies	

== Awards and nominations ==
Year	Award	Category	Work	Result	Ref.
2016	The Stephen Sondheim Society Mercury Musical Developments	Student Performer of the Year	—N/a	Won	
2022	Black British Theatre Awards	Best Female Actor in a Musical	Legally Blonde	Nominated	
2022	BroadwayWorld UK Awards	Best Leading Performer in a New Production of a Musical	Legally Blonde	Nominated	
2022	WhatsOnStage Awards	Best Performer in a Musical	Legally Blonde	Won	
2024	The Pantomime Awards	Best Magical Being	Aladdin	Nominated	
