= Dan Wright (comedian) =

English comedian and actor

- Education: Anglo European School
- Occupations: Comedian and actor
- Years active: 2001–present
- Known for: Big Cook, Little Cook

Daniel "Dan" Wright is an English comedian and actor.

== Early life ==
Wright attended the Anglo European School in Ingatestone, Essex.

== Career ==
He is best known for playing Little Cook Small in the CBeebies programme Big Cook, Little Cook with Steve Marsh, who played Big Cook Ben. Marsh and Wright form the comedy duo Electric Forecast, and have made numerous television appearances together, such as hosting Sky 1's Crash Test Dummies in February 2007.

The duo have also appeared in Kingdom, as a pair of duelling brothers and in Hotel Trubble as demolition workers Mr. Wreck and Mr. Ball, as well as hosting the CBBC show Space Hoppers. In February 2013, Wright starred in the CBBC sketch show Fit. Since January 2014, Wright has appeared in 4 O'Clock Club as Mr. Nunn, the tyrannical sports teacher. They were also guest hosts on Big Brother's Big Mouth, from 10 July to 14 July 2007.

In April 2007, Wright presented the documentary F*** Off, I'm Ginger, as part of BBC Three's Body Image documentary series. He made two guest appearances in 2010, in the television programme by CBBC, Scoop. In February 2013, he starred in Fit, a CBBC sketch show, alongside Aisling Bea, William Hartley, and Tala Gouveia.

He performed his stand-up act in August 2012, Michael Jackson Touched Me, which received a nomination for Best Show at the 2012 Leicester Comedy Festival. From 2012 to 2014, he made 16 appearances on the daytime talk show by Channel 5, The Wright Stuff. In January 2014, he began appearing as PE Teacher, Mr. Nunn, in the third series of the CBBC show 4 O'Clock Club. He continued to appear in the show until the ninth and final series which aired in 2020.

== Filmography ==
Year	Title	Role	Notes
2004	The Courtroom	Rory Carmichael	Episode: "Fists of Furry"
2004–2006	Big Cook, Little Cook	Little Cook Small	100 episodes
2007	F*** Off, I'm Ginger	Presenter	Documentary
2007	Crash Test Dummies	Dummy Dan	18 episodes
2007	Big Brother's Big Mouth	Co presenter	
2008	Kingdom	Jeff Smith	Episode: "2.1"
2008	The Town That Boars Me	Model Citizen Audience	Short
2008	Hotel Trubble	Mr Wreck	Episode: 1.13 "Demolition Day"
2010	Space Hoppers	Co presenter	7 episodes
2010	Shelfstackers	Roy	TV Pilot
2010	Sex Lessons	Presenter	Documentary
2010	Scoop	PC Taylor Mr Chillie	Episode: "Digby & the VIking" Episode: "The Heat Is On"
2013	Fit	Various	Children's sketch show
2014	4 O'Clock Club	Mr. Nunn	Comedy
