= Big Cook, Little Cook =

British children's television series

- Genre: Children's cookery show
- Created by: Jo Killingley
- Developed by: Tracey Mulcrone & Jo Killingley
- Directed by: Adrian Hedley; John Rowe; Helen Scott
- Starring: Original series: Steve Marsh; Dan Wright; Revival: Ibinabo Jack; Courtney Bowman
- Theme music composer: Anton Mullan
- Opening theme: "Welcome to Our Café"
- Ending theme: "Welcome to Our Café" (reprise, old series) "Welcome to Our Cafe (instrumental, new series)
- Country of origin: United Kingdom
- Original language: English
- No. of series: 5
- No. of episodes: 150

Production
- Executive producer: Claire Elstow
- Producers: Tracey Mulcrone & Jo Killingley
- Running time: 19 minutes
- Production companies: Top TV Productions (series 1-3); Dot to Dot Productions (series 4-5)

Original release
- Network: CBeebies
- Release: 2 February 2004 – 25 December 2006
- Release: 28 February – 31 December 2022

Big Cook, Little Cook is a British children's television series created by Jo Killingley for BBC television. The programme is set in the kitchen of a café, with two chef characters: Big Cook Ben and Little Cook Small. CBeebies aired repeats on the channel until February 2012.

Big Cook and Little Cook are both grown adults, but Small is only a few inches tall and flies around on a wooden spoon. Ben and the original Small were played by Steve Marsh and Dan Wright, respectively.

An official magazine was launched in August 2005.

The show made a comeback with a revival series in 2022, now presented by Ibinabo Jack as Big Cook Jen and Courtney Bowman as Little Cook Small. The original series is available to watch on BritBox, Prime Video and on DVD. Cake Entertainment holds worldwide distribution rights to the revival, and it is available to watch on Apple TV.

== Format ==
The format of the programme generally includes a visit to the café by a nursery rhyme, fairy tale, or fictional character (such as Little Miss Muffet or Humpty Dumpty). Each episode would begin with Big Cook Ben/Jen and Little Cook Small doing an activity or encountering a problem, and then a customer would arrive by the door of their café with Small giving the viewers and Ben/Jen hints about who the customer is.

After revealing the customer, Small then tells a short story about the visitor and ends his stories proclaiming to be the real hero. Next, they decide to cook the customer a meal from Ben/Jen's recipe book, and then collect the ingredients from either; the fridge, freezer, cupboard, fruitbowl & vegetable basket (added in series 3). If an ingredient is missing or if one of the two want to know how an ingredient is made, Small will then fly away on his magic spoon-mobile to see where one of the ingredients is made, such as a chutney factory or a rice field. These were filmed in factories and plantations mainly in the UK, Germany, Austria, France and occasionally in some other countries.

Once Small gets the ingredient or tells Ben/Jen how an ingredient is made, the two proceed to sing a song, remind the viewers of what is required for the recipe, and begin to cook. During preparation, Ben/Jen would remind the viewers to always ask their "grown-up helper" when it came to using knives, allergy information, and using the electrical appliances. After finishing the meal and serving it to the customer, they then sing a song about cleaning up the kitchen. In return for cooking a meal for the visitor, they receive a gift that would solve their problem. Each episode ends with Ben/Jen and Small saying "See you soon".

Activities within the kitchen, such as washing and tidying up, are accompanied by a catchy song and dance routines.

Both cooks act in an expansive and overblown style, but the show seems intended to encourage children to take an interest in cooking. The cooks rhyme a lot, like "We need a story to help us cook. Let's take a look in Little Cook's Book", and "Where do we look for things to cook? In the book, in the book; in Big Cook's Book!" Big Cook does most of the actual cooking and telling the viewers how to make the recipes while Little Cook does some preparation or sets the timer. Some of the aerial shots of Little Cook flying were filmed over the town of Skipton, North Yorkshire.

The revival series follows the same pattern – however, the part where Big Cook collects the ingredients is now omitted, and there is always one ingredient missing.

== Development ==
Production on the series was first announced in 2003. Initially, the series was planned to be produced by the BBC in-house. Development for the reboot was first hinted at by producer Dot to Dot Productions in October 2021 on their Facebook account, referred to as a "reboot of an iconic CBeebies brand". The reboot was announced on 18 February 2022, with a premiere date on CBeebies set for 28 February.

== Original series (2004–2006) ==
Series	Episodes	Originally released	
Series	Episodes	First released	Last released
1	28	2 February 2004	10 March 2004
2	28	19 April 2004	21 September 2004
3	44	20 May 2006	25 December 2006

=== Series 1 (2004) ===
No. overall	No. in series	Title	Directed by	Written by	Original release date
1	1	"Princess and the Pea"	Adrian Hedley	Unknown	2 February 2004
Ben's family decide to come and stay and Ben is worried he does not have enough beds for them all to sleep. A princess visits the café for a meal and they cook her princess pie; in return, she leaves them a present of some duvets and mattresses for Ben's guests. Customer: Princess Food they made: Princess Pie
2	2	"Flower Fairy"	Adrian Hedley	Vanessa Amberleigh	3 February 2004
Ben tries to arrange some flowers for the local summer fair, but is not having much luck, especially when Small steals his string to start skipping. A flower fairy is today's customer and they make her some flutterby cakes. In return she leaves the chefs a magic wand, and amazingly, Ben's flowers are rearranged into a perfect display. Customer: Flower Fairy Food they made: Flutterby Cakes
3	3	"Knight"	Adrian Hedley	Steve Jeanes	4 February 2004
Ben has been in the garden trying to pick some apples. Unfortunately, he is afraid that the apples will fall from the trees and hit him on the head. Norman the Knight visits the café for a meal, and Ben makes him a pizza shield. In return, the knight leaves Ben and Small his helmet, so Ben can wear it in the garden to protect him from falling apples. Customer: Norman the Knight Food they made: Pizza Shield
4	4	"Cat"	Adrian Hedley	Vanessa Amberleigh	5 February 2004
Ben and Small play a rhyming game. Today's customer is black cat called Cassy. Ben and Small cook her a meal of Fishy on a Dishy, and in return, she leaves them a book of rhymes. Customer: Cassy the Black Cat Food they made: Fishy on a Dishy
5	5	"Old MacDonald"	Adrian Hedley	Steve Jeanes	6 February 2004
Ben mows the grass, but his lawnmower is broken. Old MacDonald visits the café and Ben and Small make him some farmyard smoothies. He leaves Ben and Small a present that will keep the grass short. It's a goat! Customer: Old MacDonald Food they made: Farmyard Smoothies
6	6	"Spaceman"	Adrian Hedley	Unknown	9 February 2004
Small pretends to be an alien to fool Ben and later flies off to find out how marzipan is made. An astronaut visits the café, so Ben and Small decide to cook him a meal of Moon rocks. In return, he leaves them some real Moon rocks. They now have a permanent reminder of outer space. Customer: Astronaut Food they made: Moon Rocks
7	7	"Holiday Maker"	Adrian Hedley	Mellie Buse	10 February 2004
Ben has a pair of blue sandals and wants to go to the beach, but is prevented from doing so by a storm. Little Betty Blue pays a visit, and they decide to cook her some vegetable sandcastles. In return, Ben hears a seashell. Small collects some tomatoes from a greenhouse and finds out how they grow. Customer: Little Betty Blue Food they made: Veggie Sandcastles
8	8	"Decorator"	Adrian Hedley	Alison Stewart	11 February 2004
Ben paints a picture for a competition, and it looks like Small can fill in as the missing piece to his prize-winning painting. Before Ben can paint the sun, he runs out of yellow paint. Dougie the Decorator visits the café to do some painting, Ben cooks him fruity borders as a meal, and as a thank you gift, Dougie leaves Ben and Small a pot of yellow paint so Ben can finish his painting. Customer: Dougie the Decorator Food they made: Fruity Borders
9	9	"Humpty Dumpty"	Adrian Hedley	Simon Grover	12 February 2004
Ben and Small do a jigsaw puzzle, but unfortunately, they find some pieces are missing. Humpty Dumpty is today's customer, and Ben and Small make him an egg salad. In return, he leaves them the missing piece of the jigsaw puzzle he has found. Small visits an egg farm to find out where eggs come from. Customer: Humpty Dumpty Food they made: Humpty's Salad
10	10	"Magician"	Adrian Hedley	Unknown	13 February 2004
Ben and Small look for something to wear to a fancy dress party. Malcolm the Magician drops by and they decide to cook him some magic surprise bread. In return, he leaves them a magician's hat and inside are two fancy dress costumes for them to wear to the party. Small visits a chocolate bunny factory and finds out how they are made. Customer: Malcolm the Magician Food they made: Magic Bread
11	11	"Footballer"	Adrian Hedley	Adrian Hedley	16 February 2004
Ben has a box containing many balls, but Small is worried about playing with the football as it is too big for him. Franco the Footballer leaves them a present so they can both play football. Small flies off to see how cress grows. Customer: Franco the Footballer Food they made: Fab Footballs
12	12	"Bear"	Adrian Hedley	Steve Jeanes	17 February 2004
Small gets his bottom stuck in a chair, but the other chairs are too big for Small. Daddy Bear pays a visit, Ben and Small make some Buzzy Bees for him, and in return, he leaves a little chair for Small to say thanks. Small finds out how honey is made. Customer: Daddy Bear Food they made: Buzzy Bees
13	13	"Racing Driver"	Adrian Hedley	Simon Nicholson	18 February 2004
Ben and Small have a race to see who can tie their shoelaces the fastest, but are having trouble working out a good way to start the race. Today's customer is Robert the Racing Driver, Ben and Small decide to cook him some hot rod dogs and in return, he leaves them a chequered flag so they can start their race properly. But Ben ties his shoe laces so quickly that he ties them together! Small finds out how sausages are made. Customer: Robert the Racing Driver Food they made: Hot Rod Dogs
14	14	"Robot"	Adrian Hedley	Simon Nicholson	19 February 2004
It is Saucepan Sorting Day, and Ben arranges his pans in terms of what noise they make. A robot visits the café, Ben and Small bake him a gingerbread robot, and in return, he leaves Ben and Small a robot saucepan. Customer: Robot Food they made: Gingerbread Robot
15	15	"Little Red Riding Hood"	Adrian Hedley	Alison Stewart	20 February 2004
A very hungry Ben and Small are writing a shopping list when Little Red Riding Hood visits the café. She's having trouble with the wolf, who keeps pinching her cakes. Ben and Small make her a flowery basket as a treat. Grateful for the delicious basket, Little Red Riding Hood gives them the cakes which she was about to take to her grandmother. Now the wolf won't be able to eat them. Small flies off to find out how bread is made. Customer: Little Red Riding Hood Food they made: Flowery Basket
16	16	"Elephant"	Adrian Hedley	Alison Stewart	23 February 2004
Ben and Small play a memory game where they try to remember a list of objects from which one disappears. An elephant pays a visit to the café, Ben and Small decide to make a jumbo snack for him, and in return, he cleans their café – with the feather duster that's missing from their memory game. Small flies off to collect some fudge to use in the recipe. Customer: Elephant Food they made: Elephant Treat
17	17	"Mermaid"	John Rowe	Mellie Buse	24 February 2004
Ben has been swimming in the sea. He has seaweed in his hair and is very messy. Ben and Small play a game where they have to guess which sea creature the other one is impersonating. Miranda the Mermaid visits the café and they make her some mermaid soup. Miranda is grateful, so she leaves them a magic comb. Now they can comb their hair, and whenever they blow on the comb, Miranda will appear. Customer: Miranda the Mermaid Food they made: Mermaid Soup
18	18	"Clown"	John Rowe	Steve Jeanes	25 February 2004
Ben is trying to dress up as a clown, but he can't find a red nose. He tries a red pepper and a tomato, but nothing seems to work. Charlie the Clown is today's customer and Ben and Small make him a strawberry clown. In return for the delicious treat, he leaves Ben his red nose. Small visits a strawberry farm to see how strawberries grow. Customer: Charlie the Clown Food they made: Strawberry Clown
19	19	"Pilot"	Adrian Hedley	Vanessa Amberleigh	26 February 2004
The two chefs are pretending to fly when Paul the Pilot pays a visit. Ben and Small cook him a meal of Pilot's Plane, and he gives them a paper plane in exchange. Customer: Paul the Pilot Food they made: Pilot's Plane
20	20	"Hairdresser"	John Rowe	Jo Killingley	27 February 2004
Ben wants to change his hairstyle. He tries all sorts of unsuccessful styles, so a brush with Harriet the Hairdresser is just what is required. After enjoying a dish called dotty hairstyles, Harriet gives them a selection of wigs. Ben finds the perfect hairstyle – it is just like Small's! Customer: Harriet the Hairdresser Food they made: Dotty Hairstyles
21	21	"Crocodile"	Adrian Hedley	Vanessa Amberleigh	1 March 2004
Ben pretends to be a crocodile and scares Small with his jungle animal impressions. Ben gets tired of doing animal impressions and Small wishes he could see some real wild animals. Colin the Crocodile visits the café and Ben and Small make him an apple swamp for a meal. In return, he leaves them two tickets to the wildlife park so they can see some real wild animals. Customer: Colin the Crocodile Food they made: Apple Swamp
22	22	"Duck"	Adrian Hedley	Unknown	2 March 2004
Ben has washed Small's pillow and it has gone all hard and lumpy. Small is not happy. Desmond the Duck visits the café and they make him some duck dippers as a snack. In return, he leaves Small a new pillow full of lovely soft down feathers. Customer: Desmond the Duck Food they made: Duck Dippers
23	23	"Pink Monster"	John Rowe	Unknown	3 March 2004
Ben and Small have a Special Colour Day. It is pink day and they are playing a guessing game when they are interrupted by today's customer – the pink monster. Ben and Small make him some muffins and he leaves them a pink monster spell in return. Small finds out how rock is made. Customer: Pink Monster Food they made: Monster Muffins
24	24	"Tortoise"	John Rowe	Kate Gorely	4 March 2004
Ben and Small play a game about where different animals live. Timothy the Tortoise drops by and they make him a tortoise pitta. In return, he gives Small a scarf. Small uses it to finish off his new tortoise home. Customer: Timothy the Tortoise Food they made: Tortoise Salad
25	25	"Disco Dancer"	Adrian Hedley	Vanessa Amberleigh	5 March 2004
Ben and Small are dancing when the batteries on their radio run out. AJ the Disco Dancer visits the café, so Ben makes him some disco pops ice lollies. In return, AJ leaves some new batteries for Ben and Small's radio so they can carry on dancing. Small flies off to find out how Fab ice lollies are made. Customer: AJ the Disco Dancer Food they made: Disco Pops
26	26	"Police Officer"	Adrian Hedley	Unknown	8 March 2004
Small is having fun giving Ben directions to do various things like jump up and down and wiggle his finger when today's customer, Polly the Police Officer, arrives. The two chefs cook her some traffic light toast, and in return, she leaves them a police hat. Customer: Polly the Police Officer Food they made: Traffic Light Toast
27	27	"Sailor"	John Rowe	Steve Jeanes	9 March 2004
Ben and Small try to sail a paper boat, but it keeps sinking. Sam the Sailor visits the café, the two chefs make him some jelly boats, and in return, he gives them a new toy boat. Customer: Sam the Sailor Food they made: Jolly Jelly Boats
28	28	"Little Bo Peep"	Adrian Hedley	Simon Nicholson	10 March 2004
Ben receives a woolly jumper from his Aunt Betty, but he accidentally unravels it. Ben and Small cook Little Bo-Peep a potato sheep, and in return, she leaves them a lovely new jumper, just like the one Aunt Betty made. Customer: Little Bo Peep Food they made: Bo Peep's Sheep

=== Series 2 (2004) ===
No. overall	No. in series	Title	Directed by	Written by	Original release date
29	1	"Mary Mary"	John Rowe	Steve Jeanes	19 April 2004
Mary, Mary, Quite Contrary visits the café and the two chefs make her some fancy flowers. Small whizzes off to find out how boiled sweets are made. She gives them flowers in return. Customer: Mary Mary Quite Contrary Food they made: Fancy Flowers
30	2	"Elf"	Adrian Hedley	Simon Grover	20 April 2004
Ben and Small make Ernie the Elf some elfy mushrooms. In return, he leaves them some magic dust which they sprinkle on the kitchen to clean it up. Customer: Ernie the Elf Food they made: Elfy Mushrooms
31	3	"Penguin"	John Rowe	Steve Jeanes	21 April 2004
Ben enters the café wearing flippers and a mask he has found in the dressing up box. Unfortunately, Ben cannot swim, and Small wants him to take up swimming lessons. Penny the Penguin is today's customer and they make her iceberg slush. In return, she leaves Ben a pair of rubber armbands to help with his swimming lessons. Customer: Penny the Penguin Food they made: Iceberg Slush
32	4	"Dragon"	John Rowe	Tracey Mulcrone	22 April 2004
Small watches Ben fly his kite in the garden when the kite gets stuck in a tree. Ben and Small make Daniel the Dragon croissant dragons, and in return, he retrieves the kite. Customer: Daniel the Dragon Food they made: Croissant Dragon
33	5	"Scarecrow"	Adrian Hedley	Alison Stewart	23 April 2004
Ben has planted some seeds in his window box, but the birds keep eating them. Sidney the Scarecrow visits the café for a popcorn bracelet. In return, he gives Ben and Small a model scarecrow to scare away the birds. Small finds out how popcorn used in the recipe is made. Customer: Sidney the Scarecrow Food they made: Popcorn Bracelet
34	6	"Painter"	Adrian Hedley	Steve Jeanes	26 April 2004
Small wants to take a picture to send to his aunt in Australia, however, Ben's camera breaks. Meanwhile, Monsieur Le Splat, the painter, visits the café and tries herby paint pots. In return, he paints a picture of both Ben & Small so he can send it to his aunt. Customer: Monsieur Le Splat Food they made: Herby Paint Pots
35	7	"Pop Star"	John Rowe	Mellie Buse	27 April 2004
Rocking Raymond the Popstar visits the café, and Ben and Small make him jazzy ice cream. In return, he gives Ben a new microphone and Small puts his ear plugs on. Customer: Rocking Raymond the Popstar Food they made: Jazzy Ice Cream
36	8	"Firefighter"	Adrian Hedley	Unknown	28 April 2004
Frank the Firefighter drops by for some nee naw sirens. To thank Ben and Small for the meal, Frank invites them to ride in his fire engine. Small finds out how tofu is made. Customer: Frank the Firefighter Food they made: Nee-Naw Sirens
37	9	"Three Little Pigs"	John Rowe	Jo Killingley	29 April 2004
Ben and Small have to look after Fluffy the rabbit for the weekend, but they have nowhere to keep him. The Three Little Pigs visit the café, Ben and Small decide to make them some crispy bricks, and in return, the pigs leave them a new rabbit hutch, so Fluffy has somewhere safe and warm to stay. Customers: The Three Little Pigs Food they made: Crispy Bricks
38	10	"Man in the Moon"	Adrian Hedley	Mellie Buse	30 April 2004
Small pretends to make night-time noises and fools Ben. They then try and work out what other things come out at night. The Man in the Moon visits the cafe, the two chefs make him some starlight toasties and, to say thank you, he leaves them a telescope so they can see their friend whenever they like. Small flies off to find out how crisps are made. Customer: Man in the Moon Food they made: Starlight Toasties
39	11	"Dentist"	Adrian Hedley	Vanessa Amberleigh	3 May 2004
Small discovers huge bites taken out of a various foods in the kitchen but has no idea who made them. Ben has toothache, so when Denise the Dentist arrives, they make her a fruity smile. In return, she leaves them some chattering teeth and an appointment for Ben to visit the dentist to have his teeth checked. Customer: Denise the Dentist Food they made: Melon Smile
40	12	"Pirate"	Adrian Hedley	Unknown	4 May 2004
Ben returns from a shopping trip and his baguette causes Small many problems – it keeps knocking him over. Percy the Pirate visits the café and the two chefs make him some pirates' gold to eat. As a thank you present, Percy gives them some real pirates' gold. Customer: Percy the Pirate Food they made: Pirate's Gold
41	13	"Snow White"	John Rowe	Steve Jeanes	5 May 2004
Ben and Small try to decorate a wedding cake which they have made. Snow White visits the café and the chefs make her some Seven Dwarf custard tarts. In return, she leaves them a ribbon to decorate their cake. Small collects some custard for the recipe and finds out how it is made. Customer: Snow White Food they made: Seven Dwarves Pies
42	14	"Mouse"	Adrian Hedley	Simon Grover	6 May 2004
Small arrives late at the café, as his clock has broken. The mouse from Hickory Dickory Dock is today's customer and Ben and Small make him some cheesy mice. Small whizzes off to find some Emmental cheese to use in the recipe. In return, he leaves them a new alarm clock. Customer: Mortimer the Mouse Food they made: Cheesy Mice
43	15	"Train Driver"	Adrian Hedley	Vanessa Amberleigh	7 May 2004
Terry the Train Driver pays a visit and the two chefs bake him a train-shaped cake. In return, he leaves them a toy train and two tickets for the Sunflower Valley Train. Customer: Terry the Train Driver Food they made: Choo Choo Train
44	16	"Octopus"	John Rowe	Unknown	10 May 2004
Ben has decided to surprise Small by doing the washing for his holiday, but he is having trouble finishing. Olivia the Octopus is today's customer and they make potato rockpools for her. In return, she finishes all of Small's washing. Customer: Olivia the Octopus Food they made: Rock Pool
45	17	"Queen of Hearts"	Adrian Hedley	Unknown	11 May 2004
Ben and Small play a game of cards and Small decides he'd like to be a king. The Queen of Hearts visits the café and the two chefs make her some jam tarts. In return, she leaves Small a crown, so now he can be a proper king. Customer: The Queen of Hearts Food they made: Queen of Hearts Tarts
46	18	"Garden Gnome"	Adrian Hedley	Adrian Hedley	12 May 2004
Ben plays a fishing game with his new fishing rod. Small wants to join in, but Ben's fishing rod is too big for him. Edwin the Garden Gnome drops by and is served fish fingers. The gnome leaves them his fishing rod in return. Customer: Edwin the Garden Gnome Food they made: Fish Finger Crab
47	19	"Rabbit"	Adrian Hedley	Vanessa Amberleigh	13 May 2004
Ben and Small play a game that involves jumping up and down in the café. It's all part of an exercise, which is interrupted when Rodney the Rabbit visits the café. Ben makes him some carrot cake and in return, Rodney leaves them each a trampoline. With the aid of their trampolines, they can do as much jumping as they want! Customer: Rodney the Rabbit Food they made: Carrot Cakes
48	20	"Diver"	John Rowe	Alison Stewart	14 May 2004
Ben and Small race some toys in a tank of water. They then try some other objects in the tank to see which ones float and which ones sink. Dorothy the Diver pays a visit and the two chefs make her some shark samosas. In return, she leaves them a variety of objects to put in their tank of water, including a toy scuba diver. Customer: Dorothy the Diver Food they made: Shark Samosas
49	21	"Teacher"	John Rowe	Mellie Buse	17 May 2004
Small writes a list and concentrates hard to think of words beginning with the letter S. Ben and Small then start singing the alphabet song but Small can't remember what comes after the letter P. Customer: Mrs Meacher the Teacher Food they made: Alphabet Crunch
50	22	"Little Miss Muffet"	Adrian Hedley	Vanessa Amberleigh	18 May 2004
Ben's shopping bag has a hole in it and everything keeps falling out. As Ben picks his shopping up, Little Miss Muffet drops by. They make her some noodle webs, and in return, she leaves them a new shopping bag with a picture of a spider on it. Customer: Little Miss Muffet Food they made: Noodle Webs
51	23	"Explorer"	Adrian Hedley	Alison Stewart	19 May 2004
Ben and Small have fun playing a game of hide-and-seek. Edna the Explorer visits the café, Ben decides to make her a tasty treat of tiger sushi, and in return, she leaves Ben a hat covered in leaves. With his camouflaged, it is now easy for Ben to hide from Small. Customer: Edna the Explorer Food they made: Tiger Sushi
52	24	"Monkey"	Adrian Hedley	Mellie Buse	20 May 2004
Ben plays some tunes on jars in the kitchen. Small joins in the game and Ben then plays many different tunes. Martin the Monkey pays a visit, Ben and Small decide to make him some monkey baskets, and in return, he leaves them a coconut shell. Now, Small can make some more noises, and he uses them to make the sound of hoofbeats. Customer: Martin the Monkey Food they made: Monkey Baskets
53	25	"Postman"	Adrian Hedley	Mellie Buse	21 May 2004
Small makes some invitations for his party and the two chefs play a game to decide what food to cook. They make Postman Freddie Flat an envelope surprise, and he leaves Small some party invitations. When Ben was singing about Freddie Flat, he was singing to the tune of William Tell Overture. Customer: Freddie Flat the Postman Food they made: Postman's Pancakes
54	26	"Ballerina"	Adrian Hedley	Mellie Buse	19 September 2004
Small is cleaning up the kitchen while Ben is taking a nap. Selina Marina the Prima Ballerina visits the café, so they make her some berry ballerinas. To say thank you, she leaves them two tickets to the ballet. Customer: Selina Marina the Prima Ballerina Food they made: Berry Ballerina
55	27	"Jack and the Beanstalk"	John Rowe	Dan Bateman	20 September 2004
Ben is in the garden planting seeds. Small helps him plant a strange bean they found in the shed. They don't know what it is and Small is impatient for it to grow. Jack from Jack and the Beanstalk drops by and the two chefs make him a Beany Breakfast Giant. He leaves them some magic dust which they sprinkle on their bean, and magically, it grows very quickly. Customer: Jack Food they made: Beany Giant
56	28	"Cinderella"	Adrian Hedley	Mellie Buse	21 September 2004
Ben has broken his favourite broom which he uses as a pretend horse. Small tries to cheer him up by playing a game of Shape I Spy. While they are playing, Cinderella visits the café and Ben and Small make her some pumpkin pie. In return, she leaves Ben her broom, so now he has a new horse to play on. Customer: Cinderella Food they made: Pumpkin Pie

=== Series 3 (2006) ===
No. overall	No. in series	Title	Directed by	Written by	Original release date
57	1	"Frog Prince"	Adrian Hedley	Tracey Hammett	20 May 2006
Ben is in the café, admiring his treasured collection of marbles. He has named them all, and his favourite is a gold marble called Gold Dust. Small loses it when he plays football with it. As they search for it, The Frog Prince visits the café and Ben and Small cook him a delicious froggy feast. To say thank you, he leaves Ben's gold marble which he found on his way into the café, and also leaves Small a gold marble of his own. Customer: Frog Prince Food they made: Froggy Feast
58	2	"Swan"	Adrian Hedley	Alison Stewart	21 May 2006
Ben and Small practise ballet moves in the café, as they are off to the theatre to see Swan Lake. Their ballet moves are interrupted when Samantha the Swan drops by and they make her a swan sorbet. Small flies off to find out how wafers used in the recipe are made. To thank the two chefs for her meal, Samantha leaves them two pairs of tap dancing shoes so they can dance and make a noise. Customer: Samantha the Swan Food they made: Swan Sorbet
59	3	"Carpenter"	Adrian Hedley	Vanessa Amberleigh	27 May 2006
Ben noisily tries to build a shelf, irritating Small. Ben is not very good at DIY and his wonky shelf collapses. Callum the Carpenter visits the café and Ben and Small make him a veggie tool belt for a meal. To say thank you for his meal, Callum fixes Ben's shelf and leaves a tool box as a present so Ben can keep his tools organised. Customer: Callum the Carpenter Food they made: Veggie Tool Belt
60	4	"Fashion Designer"	Adrian Hedley	Tracey Mulcrone	30 October 2006
Small is browsing through fashion magazines when Ben arrives back from a shopping trip, dressed in new designer clothes. Small is upset as there are no designer clothes small enough to fit him. Fenella the Fashion Designer is today's customer and Ben and Small make her some fancy fashion biscuits. To say thank you, she leaves Small a designer outfit which she has made for him. Now he too can look stylish and fashionable. Customer: Fenella the Fashion Designer Food they made: Fancy Fashion Biscuits
61	5	"Teddy Bear"	Adrian Hedley	Jo Killingley	31 October 2006
It is a beautiful day, and Ben and Small cannot decide whether to go to the beach or to the park. They want to have a picnic, but Small is upset, as everything in the picnic hamper is too big for him. Terry the Teddy Bear visits the café for a meal and is served teddy sandwiches. To say thank you, he leaves his picnic basket which contains a small rug, small cups and plates. Now everything is the right size for Small. Customer: Terry the Teddy Bear Food they made: Teddy Sandwiches
62	6	"Hansel and Gretel"	Adrian Hedley	Tracey Mulcrone	1 November 2006
Small is lost in the kitchen behind some big boxes. Luckily, Ben finds him. Hansel and Gretel visit the café and the duo cook a vegetable house for their guests. In return for the delicious meal, Hansel and Gretel leave a duffle bag filled with tiny blue pebbles that Small can use to leave a trail, so he will never be lost again. Customers: Hansel and Gretel Food they made: Vegetable House
63	7	"Rumplestiltskin"	Adrian Hedley	Jo Killingley	2 November 2006
Ben and Small are trying to decide on names for their new pet rabbits. A customer with an unusual name visits the café – Rumpelstiltskin. Ben and Small decide to cook him some golden thread treats. Small flies off to find out how golden syrup used in the recipe is made, and in return for his meal, Rumplestiltskin leaves Ben and Small some special golden straw for the rabbit cage. They decide to call the rabbits Rumple and Stiltskin. Customer: Rumplestiltskin Food they made: Golden Thread Treats
64	8	"The Old Lady Who Lived in a Shoe"	Adrian Hedley	Unknown	3 November 2006
Ben has lost one of his shoes and Small tries to rearrange his area so he can have somewhere new to sleep, as he's fed up with sleeping in a bowl. The Old Lady Who Lived in a Shoe drops by, and Ben and Small make her a pasty boot. Small flies off to see how swedes grow. To say thank you for her meal, the Old Lady finds Ben's shoe and turns it into a new home for Small with little windows, a door and some flowers. Customer: The Old Lady Who Lived in a Shoe Food they made: Pasty Boot
65	9	"Circus Ringmaster"	Adrian Hedley	Alison Stewart	6 November 2006
Small is fed up being small; it causes many problems for him. Ben tries to reassure him that sometimes it's good to be small. Roberto the Circus Ringmaster arrives and Ben and Small cook him a delicious circus ring omelette. To say thank you for his meal, Roberto leaves two tickets to the circus and a special present for Small to make him bigger – a pair of bucket stilts. Customer: Roberto the Circus Ringmaster Food they made: Circus Ring Omelette
66	10	"Cow"	Adrian Hedley	Tracey Hammett	7 November 2006
Ben is in a very good mood, but Small points out that he has a big red spot on his face. Ben can't find a way to see his spot. Clover the Cow visits the café and the chefs make her a spotty trifle. Small flies off to find out where cream and other dairy products such as milk, yoghurt, butter and cheese come from. As a thank you gift, Clover leaves Ben and Small a moon-shaped mirror each, and Ben can look at his spot, which turns out to be a blob of ketchup. Customer: Clover the Cow Food they made: Spotty Trifle
67	11	"Photographer"	Adrian Hedley	Unknown	8 November 2006
Small tries to surprise Ben by making him a picture of them both to put on the wall. Unfortunately, his picture isn't very good. Ben arrives with a parcel – they've won a competition and the prize is a camera each. Phil the Photographer arrives and Ben and Small make him a fishcake camera. Phil leaves them a lovely picture of them both to hang on the wall. Customer: Phil the Photographer Food they made: Fishcake Camera
68	12	"Librarian"	Adrian Hedley	Jo Killingley	9 November 2006
Small reads Ben his favourite story, and they start looking at their favourite books. When they try to put the books back on the shelf, the books keep falling over. Today's customer is Libby the Librarian and Ben and Small cook her a delicious tortilla book. Small flies off to find out how tortillas used in the recipe are made, and Libby leaves Ben and Small a set of bookends for their shelf, so their books won't fall over. Customer: Libby the Librarian Food they made: Tortilla Book
69	13	"Aladdin"	Adrian Hedley	Tracey Mulcrone	10 November 2006
Ben enters the café with an old rug, claiming it's a magic carpet from Persia. Small isn't convinced Ben will be able to fly on his carpet, but Ben's determined to prove Small wrong. Their customer today is Aladdin, and Ben and Small make him a Magic Carpet Waffle. In return for his delicious meal, Aladdin leaves them a wish from his magic lamp. Small wishes that Ben's carpet can fly, and it does. Customer: Aladdin Food they made: Magic Carpet Waffle
70	14	"Bumblebee"	Adrian Hedley	Adrian Hedley	13 November 2006
Ben is enjoying peace and quiet until Small crashes in, excited about his invitation to a fancy dress competition. He thinks he will win the competition, but doesn't even have a costume. Barry the Bumblebee visits the café and Ben and Small make him a flower power salad. As a thank you for his meal, Barry leaves Small some bumblebee wings to go with his costume. Customer: Barry the Bumblebee Food they made: Flower Power Salad
71	15	"Cowgirl"	Adrian Hedley	Unknown	14 November 2006
Ben and Small pretend to be cowboys in the café, but lack cowboy hats. Casey the Cowgirl is today's customer and the two chefs make her star bean burgers. Small flies off to find some buffalo mozzarella cheese to use in the recipe. To say thank you for her delicious meal, Casey leaves Ben her cowboy hat to wear. Small has made his own, and now they both have hats and can be proper cowboys. Customer: Casey the Cowgirl Food they made: Star Bean Burger
72	16	"Vet"	Adrian Hedley	Tracey Hammett	15 November 2006
Ben is wiggling in the café today. Small wants to wiggle too, but unfortunately, he has lost his wiggle and cannot do it. Vera the Vet visits the café and Ben and Small make her a delicious pitta bread dog. Small flies off to see how olives grow, and to say thank you for her meal, Vera leaves Small some special wiggle biscuits. He tries one and as if by magic, he starts to wiggle again. Customer: Vera the Vet Food they made: Pitta Bread Dog
73	17	"Gardener"	Adrian Hedley	Adrian Hedley	16 November 2006
Small waits for Ben to pick some flowers from the garden to put in a vase. Unfortunately, all he returns with are vegetables, as his flowers have not grown. Gary the Gardener pays a visit and Ben and Small make him some delicious gardener's pickle. Small flies off to find out how pickled vegetables are made. To say thank you for his meal, Gary leaves a plant pot and a packet of special fast-growing flower seeds. Customer: Gary the Gardener Food they made: Gardener's Pickle
74	18	"Golden Goose"	Adrian Hedley	Tracey Hammett	17 November 2006
Ben's upset as his sleeping bag has lost its stuffing. Goldie the Golden Goose visits the café and Ben and Small cook her some delicious golden plum eggs. Small flies off to find out where plums grow. In return for her meal, Goldie leaves some lovely soft goose down. Now Ben can mend his sleeping bag. Customer: Goldie the Golden Goose Food they made: Golden Plum Eggs
75	19	"Snake"	Adrian Hedley	Vanessa Amberleigh	20 November 2006
Ben and Small are playing snakes and ladders in the café when Ben loses the dice. Sylvester the Snake pays a visit, so Ben and Small decide to make him some delicious snaky pasta. To say thank you for his meal, Sylvester leaves Ben and Small a shaker for their dice. Customer: Sylvester the Snake Food they made: Snaky Pasta
76	20	"Jack and Jill"	Adrian Hedley	Alison Stewart	21 November 2006
Small is upset as he doesn't get any post. Ben explains that he needs to send letters in order to receive some. Jack and Jill visit the café and Ben and Small make them a delicious citrus punch. Small whizzes off to find out where spring water comes from. Jack and Jill leave a thank you card for Small, so now he has some post. But there's more cards, as Ben and Small have both made each other special cards! Customers: Jack and Jill Food they made: Citrus Punch
77	21	"Goldfish"	Adrian Hedley	Unknown	22 November 2006
Ben and Small want to get a pet, but can't make up their minds. Gupta the Goldfish is today's customer and Ben and Small make him a fish tank quiche. Small whizzes off to find some broccoli for the recipe, and to say thank you for his meal, Gupta solves the pet problem. He leaves them a tank with two toy goldfish in it. Ben and Small decide to call their new pets Broccoli and Carrot. Customer: Gupta the Goldfish Food they made: Fish Tank Quiche
78	22	"Bus Driver"	Adrian Hedley	Adrian Hedley	23 November 2006
Ben is riding his bike around the café when his tyre bursts. Small offers him a ride on his skateboard, but it is too small. Betty the Bus Driver drops by and Ben and Small make her some delicious bagel wheels. Small flies off to find out how bagels are made. To say thanks for her meal, Betty leaves a puncture repair kit for Ben to mend his bike and invites them both to come for a ride on her bus. Customer: Betty the Bus Driver Food they made: Bagel Wheels
79	23	"Wee Willie Winkie"	John Rowe	Tracey Hammett	24 November 2006
Small is exercising when Ben arrives in the café, still in his dressing gown. Small says Ben's dressing gown is much nicer than his. Today's customer is Wee Willie Winkie, and Ben and Small bake him a perfect eight o'clock cake. Small flies off to find out how drinking chocolate is made, and to thank the two chefs, Wee Willie Winkie leaves two presents – a new dressing gown for Small, and a lavender pillow to help Ben sleep. Customer: Wee Willie Winkie Food they made: Eight O'Clock Cake
80	24	"Archaeologist"	John Rowe	Tracey Mulcrone	27 November 2006
Ben comes in from the garden excited, as he's dug up a bone which he thinks might be from a dinosaur. Small shows Ben the model dinosaurs he's collected, and Amanda the Archaeologist pays a visit to the café. Ben and Small make her dinosaur mash and Small flies off to find some asparagus for the recipe. Amanda leaves a note saying she was digging in their garden and found a bone buried by the neighbour's dog. Customer: Amanda the Archaeologist Food they made: Dinosaur Mash
81	25	"Yeti"	John Rowe	Alison Stewart	28 November 2006
Ben and Small have come in from playing in the garden in the snow, as they don't have warm footwear. Yan the Yeti visits the café and Ben and Small make him yeti pear pudding. Small flies off to find out how rice pudding is made, and to thank Ben and Small for his meal, Yan leaves them both a pair of furry snow boots. Now they can go back into the garden and play. Customer: Yan the Yeti Food they made: Yeti Pear Pudding
82	26	"Butterfly"	John Rowe	Unknown	29 November 2006
Ben finds a baby's rattle and tells Small about what he was like as a baby. He shows Small his baby photos, and there are also some of Small's photos in the pile. Belinda the Butterfly drops by and Ben and Small make her a delicious Cabbage Butterfly. Small flies off to find some red cabbage to use in the recipe, and to say thank you, Belinda leaves them a photo album as a present. Now Ben and Small can organise their baby photos. Customer: Belinda the Butterfly Food they made: Cabbage Butterfly
83	27	"Twins"	John Rowe	Tracey Hammett	30 November 2006
Ben gives Small a demonstration of his spoon playing. Two identical customers arrive – Bob and Bill the twins, and Ben and Small find a perfect recipe for them, a Twin Bean Salad. Small flies off to see how beansprouts grow. To say thank you for their meal, Bob and Bill leave Ben and Small a pack of cards so they can play a game of snap. Customers: Bob and Bill the Twins Food they made: Twin Bean Salad
84	28	"Magpie"	John Rowe	Unknown	1 December 2006
Ben is upset because has lost his gold ring, which was a present from his grandad. Monica the Magpie is today's customer, and Ben and Small decide to make her a delicious fruity nest, so Small flies off to find out how frozen yogurt is made. Monica enjoys her meal and she leaves a thank-you note, along with Ben's ring, which she has found. Customer: Monica the Magpie Food they made: Fruity Nest
85	29	"Three Billy Goats Gruff"	John Rowe	Unknown	4 December 2006
In disguise, Ben enters the café, but Small spots him straight away as his face looks the same. The Three Billy Goats Gruff visit the café, and Ben and Small make them a baguette bridge. Small flies off to find some goat's cheese to use in the recipe. To thank Big Cook and Little Cook for their meal, the goats leave Small some mossy shoes and a false goatee beard for Ben's disguise. Customers: Three Billy Goats Gruff Food they made: Baguette Bridge
86	30	"Snail"	John Rowe	Vanessa Amberleigh	5 December 2006
Ben does everything very slowly. Small does everything very quickly, but keeps knocking things over and breaking things. A very slow customer visits the café – Sarah the Snail. Ben and Small make her delicious cheese and spinach snails. Small flies off to find some spinach for the recipe, and to say thank you for her meal, Sarah leaves a new sugar bowl. Customer: Sarah the Snail Food they made: Cheese and Spinach Snails
87	31	"Gingerbread Man"	John Rowe	Alison Stewart	6 December 2006
Ben and Small get ready for the Cooks' Fun Day. Small is upset, as he's too small to enter most of the races, and worries he'll never win. The Gingerbread Man then pays a visit to the café and Ben and Small make him some gingerbread people. To thank Ben and Small for his meal, the Gingerbread Man leaves a small egg, so Small can enter the egg and spoon race. Customer: Gingerbread Man Food they made: Gingerbread People
88	32	"Weather Forecaster"	John Rowe	Tracey Hammett	7 December 2006
Ben has been caught in the rain and is not happy. Small explains why it is important that it rains when Wendy the Weather Forecaster drops by. Ben and Small decide to make her cauliflower clouds, and to thank the two chefs for her meal, Wendy gives Ben and Small their own special forecast in a rhyme. It stops raining outside and the sun comes out! Customer: Wendy the Weather Forecaster Food they made: Cauliflower Clouds
89	33	"Seagull"	John Rowe	Jo Killingley	8 December 2006
Small has been keeping lots of rubbish for recycling and Ben wants to recycle, too. Siegfried the Seagull is today's customer, and Ben and Small make him a delicious seafood cocktail. Small flies off to find out where shellfish comes from. In exchange, Siegfried leaves Ben and Small three recycling bins so now they can sort all their recycling easily. Customer: Siegfried the Seagull Food they made: Seafood Cocktail
90	34	"Donkey"	John Rowe	Tracey Hammett	11 December 2006
Ben and Small are invited to a party at Old King Cole's palace. They are very excited, but they have to take a game with them that everyone can play, and they can't decide what to take. Daphne the Donkey visits the café and Ben and Small decide to make her a munchy crunchy carrot. In return, she leaves them a game of Stick the Tail on the Donkey that they can take to the party. Customer: Daphne the Donkey Food they made: Munchy Crunchy Carrot
91	35	"Lion"	John Rowe	Tracey Hammett	12 December 2006
Ben has a splinter in his finger but he's not brave enough to let Small try and take it out. Today's customer is Lionel the Lion and Ben and Small make him a delicious lion crumble. Small whizzes off to find a mango to use in the recipe. To thank Ben and Small for his meal, Lionel leaves special medals for Ben and Small for being so brave. Big Cook and Little Cook are kings of the kitchen! Customer: Lionel the Lion Food they made: Lion Crumble
92	36	"King from Sing a Song of Sixpence"	John Rowe	Unknown	13 December 2006
Ben is having a bad day – he keeps dropping things and breaking them, and they cannot afford replacements. The king from Sing a Song of Sixpence asks for a king pie. The king's thank you gift is a bag of gold coins. Customer: King from Sing a Song of Sixpence Food they made: King Pie
93	37	"Sleeping Beauty"	John Rowe	Vanessa Amberleigh	14 December 2006
Small feels sleepy. However, there is no time for sleeping when there is a customer to be served. Sleeping Beauty visits and Ben and Small make her some delicious wake-up juice. To thank the chefs for her drink, she leaves a special magical wake-up kiss for Small. Customer: Sleeping Beauty Food they made: Wake Up Juice
94	38	"Pied Piper"	John Rowe	Tracey Mulcrone	15 December 2006
Panic ensues when a rat is found in the kitchen. A customer arrives – the Pied Piper! Ben and Small make him some delicious cheeky potato rats. In return, he gives them a magic pipe to shoo away the rat. Customer: Pied Piper Food they made: Cheeky Potato Rats
95	39	"Conductor"	John Rowe	Jo Killingley	18 December 2006
Ben listens to classical music while Small acts out all the different instruments. Today's customer is Colin the Conductor, who is served some delicious cheesy batons with a salsa dip. In return, he leaves them his conducting baton. Customer: Colin the Conductor Food they made: Cheesy Batons
96	40	"Astronomer"	John Rowe	Tracey Hammett	19 December 2006
The chefs go to bed wishing on a star. The next day, Astrid the Astronomer visits for a delicious marrow telescope. To thank the chefs for her meal, she names a recently-discovered star after Small. Customer: Astrid the Astronomer Food they made: Marrow Telescope
97	41	"Mole"	John Rowe	Unknown	20 December 2006
Small wants to go for a ride on his scooter, but he's lost the key to the store cupboard. Marco the Mole visits the café and the chefs make him some mince pie moles. In exchange, he gives them something he found under the floorboards – the key to the cupboard. Customer: Marco the Mole Food they made: Mince Pie Moles
98	42	"Kangaroo"	John Rowe	Unknown	21 December 2006
Ben and Small can't find any of their things. Kim the kangaroo hops into the cafe and Ben and Small make her a kangaroo pouch. In return, she leaves them pouches of their own to keep things in. Customer: Kim the Kangaroo Food they made: Kangaroo Pouch
99	43	"Optician"	John Rowe	Unknown	22 December 2006
Omar the Optician visits. Ben and Small make him some delicious aubergine spectacles. As a thank you for his meal, Omar mends Small's glasses. Customer: Omar the Optician Food they made: Aubergine Spectacles
100	44	"Father Christmas"	John Rowe	Tracey Mulcrone	25 December 2006
Ben and Small put up the Christmas decorations in the café. Father Christmas is their customer today and they make him a meringue snowman. Small flies off to get some marmalade to use in the recipe, and to thank Ben and Small for his meal, Father Christmas leaves them a present. It's a star to go on top of their tree. Customer: Father Christmas Food they made: Meringue Snowman

== Revival series (2022) ==
Series	Episodes	Originally released	
Series	Episodes	First released	Last released
4	25	28 February 2022	1 April 2022
5	25	5 November 2022	31 December 2022

=== Series 4 (2022) ===
No. overall	No. in series	Title	Directed by	Written by	Original release date
101	1	"Ginger the Gingerbread Man"	Helen Scott	Tracey Hammett	28 February 2022
Jen amazes Small with her tap-dancing skills. Small finds out how ginger is grown and ground. Plus, the two chefs cheer up a lonely gingerbread man with some gingerbread friends. Customer: Gingerbread Man Food they made: Gingerbread Friends
102	2	"Straw-berry the Scarecrow"	Helen Scott	Unknown	1 March 2022
Small tries to grow a sunflower so she can enter it into the tallest sunflower competition. Big Cook's Big Cookery Book gives them a sunflower-inspired recipe for Straw-berry the Scarecrow. Customer: Straw-berry the Scarecrow Food they made: Sunflower Surprise
103	3	"Wayne the Whale"	Helen Scott	Unknown	2 March 2022
Jen brings a boat into the café and teaches Small about sailing. Meanwhile, Small finds out how aubergines grow. They use them to make Wayne the Whale a delicious plate of food. Customer: Wayne the Whale Food they made: Aubergine Whale
104	4	"Ferdinand the Frog Prince"	Helen Scott	Alison Stewart	3 March 2022
Jen and Small cook up a delicious froggy fruit salad for Ferdinand the Frog Prince. Ferdinand loves it so much, that he gives them some royal presents to say thank you. Customer: Ferdinand the Frog Prince Food they made: Froggie Fruit Salad
105	5	"Peanut the Parrot"	Helen Scott	Unknown	4 March 2022
Jen finds a message in a bottle in the washing up and Small believes it's from Pirate Tiny Spoon. While on a treasure hunt, they get a visit from Peanut the Parrot and make her a treasure pie recipe. Customer: Peanut the Parrot Food they made: Treasure Pie
106	6	"The Big Bad Wolf"	Helen Scott	Tracey Hammett	7 March 2022
Jen and Small attempt to win a place in the Silly Book of World Records. Meanwhile, they cook a big bad bean burger for the Big Bad Wolf. Customer: The Big Bad Wolf Food they made: Big Bad Bean Burger
107	7	"Maisie the Mechanic"	Helen Scott	Tracey Hammett	8 March 2022
The café is very noisy because all of the cupboards are creaking and Small's scooter is squeaking. Today's recipe is crispy tools for Maisie the Mechanic, who may be able to help with their noisy problems. Customer: Maisie the Mechanic Food they made: Crispy Tools
108	8	"Cosmo the Butterfly"	Helen Scott	Howard Davidson	9 March 2022
Jen and Small are going camping, but Small doesn't have a sleeping bag. Hungry Cosmo the Caterpillar comes to the cafe and they cook him a delicious caterpillar wrap. Customer: Cosmo the Butterfly Food they made: Caterpillar Wrap
109	9	"Georgina the Gymnast"	Helen Scott	Tracey Hammett	10 March 2022
Small attempts to teach Jen how to do a forward roll, but Jen is finding it tricky. Meanwhile, Georgina the Gymnast visits the cafe where Jen and Small cook her a delicious twirly pasta dish. Customer: Georgina the Gymnast Food they made: Twirly Ribbons
110	10	"Incy Wincy Spider"	Helen Scott	Tracey Hammett	11 March 2022
Jen and Small have a blocked sink. Incy Wincy Spider visits the café for a bite to eat. The café is out of peanut butter, so Small flies on her 'spoonmobile' to find some as they make a spider power balls recipe. Customer: Incy Wincy Spider Food they made: Spider Power Balls
111	11	"Maverick Mouse"	Helen Scott	Unknown	14 March 2022
Jen and Small are having a movie night, but Jen has forgotten to buy some treats. Today's customer is Maverick the Movie Mouse, so they cook him a dish worthy of a movie star. Customer: Maverick the Movie Mouse Food they made: Pizza Clock
112	12	"Sid the Snowman"	Helen Scott	Unknown	15 March 2022
Jen pretends to be Jiggly Cook, the jelly juggler. Small is worried that jelly is going to be hard to juggle. Small finds out where potatoes grow, and they make snow family pie for today's customer, Sid the Snowman. Customer: Sid the Snowman Food they made: Snow Family Pie
113	13	"Maeve the Mountaineer"	Helen Scott	Tracey Mulcrone	16 March 2022
Small makes a mess in the kitchen, sending raisins everywhere. They receive a visit from Maeve the Mountaineer and cook her some rock cake mountains. Customer: Maeve the Mountaineer Food they made: Rock Cake Mountains
114	14	"Denzil the Dragon"	Helen Scott	Alison Stewart	17 March 2022
Jen and Small pretend to be knights. Small finds out how naan bread is made, and they cook a perfect dhal recipe for Denzil the Dragon. Customer: Denzil the Dragon Food they made: Dragon Dhal
115	15	"Ada the Artist"	Helen Scott	Tracey Hammett	18 March 2022
Jen tries to paint a cheetah, but she has run out of paint for the spots. They are visited by Ada the Artist and cook her a delicious arty pancake. Customer: Ada the Artist Food they made: Arty Pancake Palette
116	16	"Humpty Dumpty the Egg"	Helen Scott	Unknown	21 March 2022
Jen and Small are visited by Humpty Dumpty. Small flies off to find out where eggs come from and brings back an egg perfect for the Humpty's scotch egg recipe. Customer: Humpty Dumpty the Egg Food they made: Humpty's Scotch Egg
117	17	"Busy the Bee"	Helen Scott	Alan Robinson	22 March 2022
Jen is a rock star in the café today, but Small is too small to play any of the instruments. Meanwhile, Busy the Bee visits the cafe for a speedy snack and leaves them the perfect gift. Customer: Busy the Bee Food they made: Honey Pots
118	18	"Pickle Power Girl"	Helen Scott	Tracey Hammett	24 March 2022
Big Cook Jen and Little Cook Small are playing superheroes today and are ready to save the world. But poor Jen has ripped her cape! Meanwhile, they're visited by Pickle Power Girl, a real superhero. Customer: Pickle Power Girl Food they made: Power Pickles
119	19	"Eric the Explorer"	Helen Scott	Tracey Mulcrone	23 March 2022
Jen is birdwatching on a kitchen safari, while Small guesses which birds and animals they can see. Eric the Explorer visits the cafe for something to eat, so they cook him something exciting and unusual, just like the things Eric discovers in the wild. Customer: Eric the Explorer Food they made: Tiger Scones
120	20	"Bounce the Bunny"	Helen Scott	Alan Robinson	25 March 2022
Small wants to be the first at everything in the café, including greeting today's customer, Bounce the Bunny. Jen and Small decide to make Bounce a rabbity carrot cake. Customer: Bounce the Bunny Food they made: Rabbity Carrot Cake
121	21	"Princess Pea"	Helen Scott	Howard Davidson	28 March 2022
Jen and Small want to cook pillow samosas for Princess Pea, but they have run out of peas. Small flies on her spoon to find some in order to make the perfect recipe. Customer: Princess Pea Food they made: Samosa Pillow
122	22	"Old MacDonald the Farmer"	Helen Scott	Unknown	29 March 2022
Big Cook sets up her toy farm in the kitchen, but she doesn't have Small's favourite animal to add. Meanwhile, Old MacDonald visits the cafe, so Jen and Small cook him some cauliflower sheep. Customer: Old MacDonald the Farmer Food they made: Cauliflower Sheep
123	23	"The Pipe-Playing Piper"	Helen Scott	Unknown	30 March 2022
Small has a new recorder but is having trouble learning how to play it. Jen and Small cook something tasty and tuneful for the Pied Piper. Customer: Pied Piper Food they made: Veggie Rat Rolls
124	24	"Billy Goats"	Helen Scott	Tracey Hammett	31 March 2022
Small guards her final biscuit, but Jen wants to eat it too! Big and Small cook up a delicious veggie bow bridge for today's visitors, the Three Billy Goats Gruff. Customers: Three Billy Goats Gruff Food they made: Veggie-Bow Bridge
125	25	"Ruby Robot"	Helen Scott	Howard Davidson	1 April 2022
Jen starts a kitchen disco in the café while they bake cakes, but the radio runs out of batteries. Meanwhile, they cook a delicious robot fridge cake for Ruby Robot. Customer: Ruby the Robot Food they made: Robot Fridge Cake

=== Series 5 (2022) ===
No. overall	No. in series	Title	Directed by	Written by	Original release date
126	1	"Olive the Opera Singer"	Helen Scott	Unknown	5 November 2022
Jen and Small find it hard to hear each other today. Olive the Opera Singer comes to visit, Small finds out how lemons grow and they make musical muffins for their special tuneful guest. Customer: Olive the Opera Singer Food they made: Musical Muffins
127	2	"Hatty the Hedgehog"	Helen Scott	Tracey Hammett	6 November 2022
The chefs have a scavenger hunt in the café, finding spiky things. Hatty the Hedgehog comes to visit, Small flies off to find out how flour is made and the two chefs whisk up delicious hedgehog rolls for their snuffly guest. Customer: Hatty the Hedgehog Food they made: Hedgehog Rolls
128	3	"Walter the Wizard"	Helen Scott	Howard Davidson	12 November 2022
It's treat time in the café, and the chefs want to eat ice cream, but the freezer is too cold to go near. Walter Wizard visits them, Small flies off to see how beetroot grows, and the two friends whisk up cauldron soup for their magical guest. Customer: Walter the Wizard Food they made: Cauldron Soup
129	4	"Peter and Paul the Dicky Birds"	Helen Scott	Stefan Gibbons-Arif	13 November 2022
Small spends the day trying to make a sad Jen laugh after she breaks her pastry brush. The dicky birds Peter and Paul visit the cafe, Small flies off to see how strawberries grow, and the two chefs cook up tweety shortbread for their feathered guests. Customers: Peter and Paul the Dicky Birds Food they made: Tweety Shortbread
130	5	"Isaac the Inventor"	Helen Scott	Tracey Hammett	19 November 2022
Jen makes a rain stick using rice, and Small wants one too. Isaac the Inventor visits the cafe, Small flies off to find out how popcorn is made, and the chefs cook up cheesy corn clouds for their clever guest. Customer: Isaac the Inventor Food they made: Cheesy Corn Clouds
131	6	"Mike the Music Man"	Helen Scott	Unknown	20 November 2022
Small is entering the local talent show, but she's forgotten the words to her song. Meanwhile, Mike the Music Man comes to visit, Small flies off to see how celery grows, and the two chefs serve a delicious risotto drum to their talented guest. Customer: Mike the Music Man Food they made: Risotto Drum
132	7	"Larry the Lighthouse Keeper"	Helen Scott	Tracey Hammett	26 November 2022
Jen's brought in her special marble collection to show Small. Larry the Lighthouse Keeper visits the café, Small flies off to find out how baked beans are made, and the two friends make a starry breakfast sky for their light-shining guest. Customer: Larry the Lighthouse Keeper Food they made: Starry Breakfast Sky
133	8	"Wiggly Woo the Worm"	Helen Scott	Unknown	27 November 2022
Small pretends to be a detective, as something has eaten all the salad in the garden. Wiggly Woo the Worm comes to visit, Small flies off on her spoon to find out how rhubarb is harvested, and the two chefs cook a delicious worm crumble for their wiggly guest. Customer: Wiggly Woo the Worm Food they made: Worm Crumble
134	9	"Camar the Crocodile"	Helen Scott	Liam Farrell	3 December 2022
Jen has brought in the board game snakes and ladders, but has lost the dice. Camar the Crocodile visits the café, Small whizzes off to see how courgettes grow, and the two chefs make a courgette crocodile for their snappy guest. Customer: Camar the Crocodile Food they made: Courgette Crocodile
135	10	"Hasina the Hairdresser"	Helen Scott	Tracey Hammett	4 December 2022
Jen has brought in a bag of wigs, but she needs a mirror to see what she looks like. Hasina the Hairdresser comes to visit, Small flies on her magic spoon to find out how biscuits are iced, and they make hairdo cookies for their fancy friend. Customer: Hasina the Hairdresser Food they made: Hairdo Cookies
136	11	"Sunny the Sun"	Helen Scott	Alan Robinson	10 December 2022
The chefs are getting ready for a wedding, and Jen is wearing her prized hat. Sunny Sun comes to visit, Small flies off to see how ketchup is made, and the two chefs cook a sweet and sour hat for their beaming guest. Customer: Sunny the Sun Food they made: Sweet and Sour Hat
137	12	"Tess the Train Driver"	Helen Scott	Tracey Hammett	11 December 2022
Jen is playing with her toy train set, but she really wants to go on a real steam train. Tess the Train Driver comes to visit, Small flies off to see how leeks grow, and they make a choo-choo party platter for their special guest. Customer: Tess the Train Driver Food they made: Choo-Choo Party Platter
138	13	"Paddie the Polar Bear"	Helen Scott	Tracey Hammett	17 December 2022
It's the hottest day of the year, but Small wants it to snow. Paddie the Polar Bear visits the cafe, Small flies off to see how chocolate buttons are made, and the two friends make chilly polar cones for their Arctic guest. Customer: Paddie the Polar Bear Food they made: Polar Cones
139	14	"Doctor Dolly"	Helen Scott	James Bishop; Chris Douch	18 December 2022
Small is feeling very sleepy today. Jen is having fun with her marble run, but she's missing a part. Doctor Dolly visits the cafe, Small flies off to see how broccoli grows, and the chefs whizz up a five-a-day pasta recipe for their kind guest. Customer: Doctor Dolly Food they made: Five-a-day Pasta
140	15	"Puss in Boots the Cat"	Helen Scott	Alan Robinson; Tracey Hammett	19 December 2022
Jen has been playing in the puddles after the rain, but Small doesn't have any sensible shoes to wear. Puss in Boots, the magical cat, comes to visit. Small flies off on her spoon to find out how to catch fish, and the two chefs cook a fishcake crown for their purrfect guest. Customer: Puss in Boots the Cat Food they made: Fishcake Crown
141	16	"Gabby the Goalkeeper"	Helen Scott	Howard Davidson	20 December 2022
Jen is doing the washing up, but her hands are going wrinkly. Gabby the Goalkeeper visits the cafe, Small flies off on her spoon to find out where milk comes from, and the two chefs make a power shake to give Gabby an energy boost for her next game of football. Customer: Gabby the Goalkeeper Food they made: Power Shake
142	17	"Old Mother Hubbard and her Dog"	Helen Scott	Clare Bradley	21 December 2022
Jen has hidden some toys in the cafe for Small to find, but she can't remember where she hid Dog. Old Mother Hubbard comes to visit, Small finds out how mushrooms grow, and the chefs cook up a tortilla pup for their dog-loving guest. Customer: Old Mother Hubbard and her Dog Food they made: Tortilla Pup
143	18	"Aladdin and his Carpet"	Helen Scott	Tracey Mulcrone	22 December 2022
Everything is going missing in the cafe today. Aladdin comes to visit, Small whizzes off on her spoon to find out how raisins are made, and the chefs make a magical couscous carpet for their fairytale friend. Customer: Aladdin Food they made: Magic Couscous Carpet
144	19	"Goldilocks and the Three Bears"	Helen Scott	Tracey Hammett	23 December 2022
Jen and Small are getting ready for a picnic, but the basket and cutlery are too big for Small. Goldilocks visits the café, Small finds out how porridge oats grow, and the chefs cook up delicious `bear bites' for their bear-loving guest. Customer: Goldilocks Food they made: Bear Bites
145	20	"Marla the Mermaid"	Helen Scott	Unknown	26 December 2022
The two chefs pretend to have a beach holiday, but they haven't got a flag for Small's sandcastle or a sun hat for Jen. Marla the Mermaid comes to visit, Small finds out how spinach grows, and they cook delicious sweet potato boats for their enchanting guest. Customer: Marla the Mermaid Food they made: Sweet Potato Boats
146	21	"Jack from Jack and the Beanstalk"	Helen Scott	Tracey Hammett	27 December 2022
Jen's brought in her sticker album to show Small, and she wants to finish filling it. Jack from Jack and the Beanstalk comes to visit, Small flies off to see how runner beans grow, and the two cooks rustle up a magic bean curry for their beanstalk-climbing guest. Customer: Jack from Jack and the Beanstalk Food they made: Magic Bean Curry
147	22	"Cinderella and her Slippers"	Helen Scott	Unknown	28 December 2022
Jen and Small are off to a disco, but they need to finish dusting before they can go. Cinderella visits the cafe, Small flies off to see how pumpkins grow, and the chefs make pumpkin slippers for their magical friend. Customer: Cinderella Food they made: Pumpkin Slippers
148	23	"Asteroid the Alien"	Helen Scott	Tracey Mulcrone	29 December 2022
Jen's being really clumsy in the cafe and can't work out why. Asteroid the Alien comes to visit, Small flies off to see how apples grow, and the cooks make wobbly space jelly for their intergalactic guest. Customer: Asteroid the Alien Food they made: Space Jelly
149	24	"Dylan the Dinosaur"	Helen Scott	Tracey Hammett	30 December 2022
Jen and Small have a sleepover, but Small doesn't have a toothbrush that's her size. Dylan the Dinosaur comes to visit, Small flies off to see how peppers grow, and the two friends cook up a falafel-saurus for their Jurassic guest. Customer: Dylan the Dinosaur Food they made: Falafelsaurus
150	25	"Flora the Fairy"	Helen Scott	Unknown	31 December 2022
The chefs are off to Granny Small's big birthday party, but Jen is worried, as she hasn't got a present. Flora the Flower Fairy visits the cafe, Small flies off to find out how jam is made, and the two cooks magic up some flower fairy tarts for their special fluttery guest. Customer: Flora the Fairy Food they made: Flower Fairy Tarts

== Home media ==
BBC Worldwide released several DVDs of the series in the United Kingdom.

Title	Episodes	Release date
Welcome to Our Cafe	Pirate Holiday Maker; Queen of Hearts; Penguin; Cat	21 March 2005
We Love to Cook	Footballer Clown; Dentist; Disco Dancer; Racing Driver	19 September 2005
Fairytale Feast	Princess and the Pea Little Bo Peep; Snow White; Old Macdonald; Mary Mary	31 October 2005
Farmyard Friends	Cow Donkey; Golden Goose; Vet; Three Billy Goats Gruff; Cowgirl	6 March 2006
Christmas Puddings	Father Christmas Mole; Yeti; Cinderella; Fashion Designer; Magpie	13 November 2006
The Frog Prince and Other Stories	Frog Prince Bus Driver; Snake; Wee Willie Winkie	26 March 2007
