= Sheila Bernette =

English singer and actress (1931–2026)

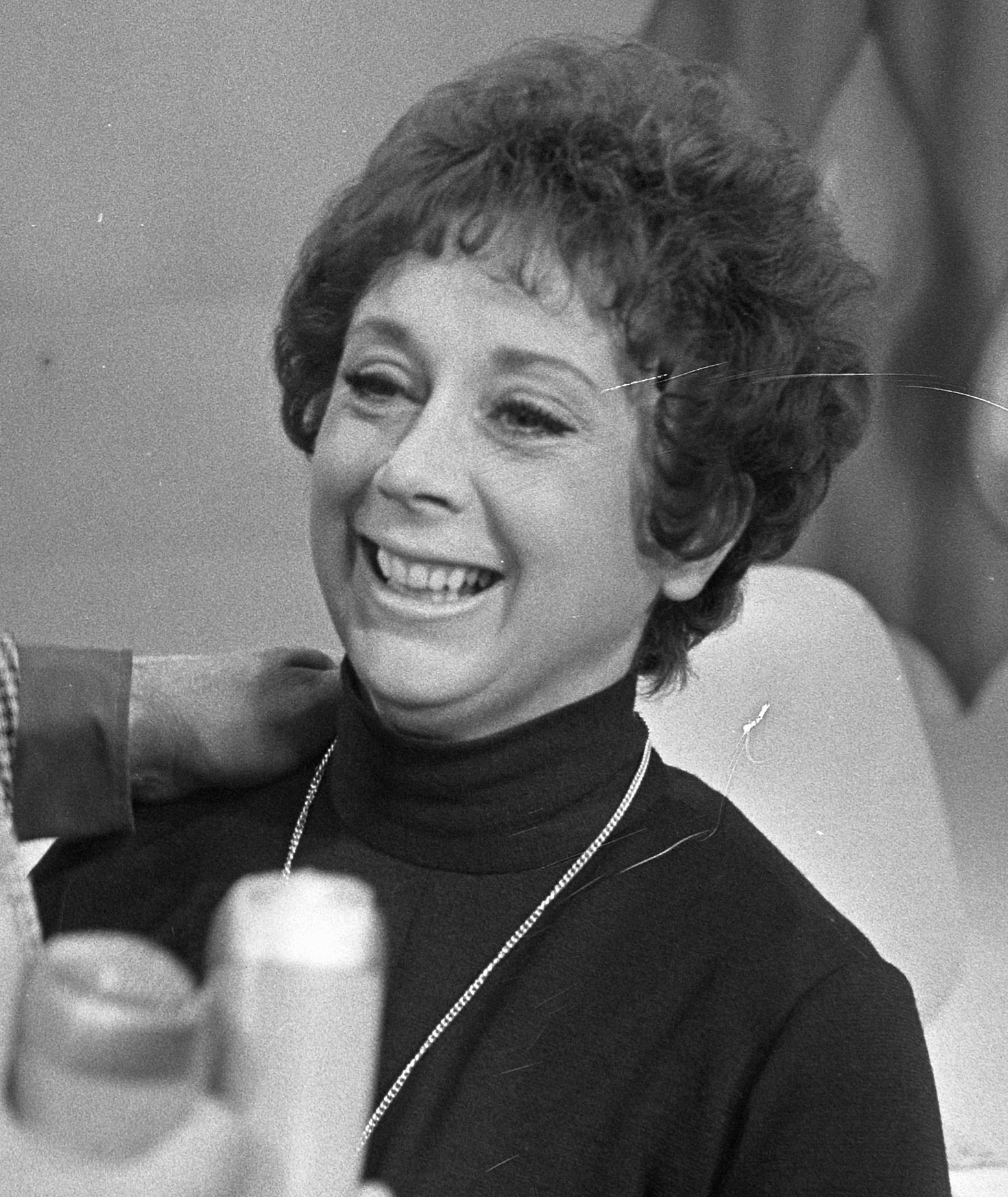
- Bernette in 1971
- Born: Sheila Mary Poncini; 30 March 1931; Marylebone, London, England
- Died: 12 January 2026 (aged 94)
- Occupations: Actress; singer
- Years active: 1955–2011

Sheila Bernette (occasionally Burnette; 30 March 1931 – 12 January 2026) was an English actress and singer who appeared in film, television and radio with a career spanning over 50 years.

== Early life ==
Bernette was born Sheila Mary Poncini in Marylebone, London on 30 March 1931. She was the daughter of Charles Poncini, a restaurant waiter of Italian descent, and his wife Freda (nee Morris).. She attended the Italia Conti Stage Academy from the age of two, specialising in ballet, leaving after five years to concentrate on acting at the Aida Foster Theatre School.

== Career ==
Bernette began her television career in 1955. She was popular and appeared as herself from 1968 in multiple UK television shows. Largely appearing in comedy roles, she was a regular sidekick to many stars including Dick Emery and Leslie Crowther. Bernette appeared as herself in many television productions. She is remembered as one of the regular practical jokers in the UK version of Candid Camera. Very petite, Bernette usually wore her hair up to increase her height. A competent singer, she was a regular on variety shows such as the Good Old Days and The Black and White Minstrel Show and appeared on the Royal Variety Performance show of 1970. In addition to her film and television roles, Bernette was a regular performer at the Players' Theatre in Covent Garden.

In her Royal Variety Performance, she was introduced by Leslie Crowther as a Russian defector, the ballerina "Natalia Nokemova", and performed the Dance of the Sugar Plum Fairy with Crowther playing ballet cricketer "Freddie Trumanov". Her final film role was in Driving Aphrodite in 2009, playing a pickpocket and shoplifter. Her final television role was in Hotel Trubble, appearing in every episode from 2008 to 2011 as the long-term hotel resident and later cleaner, Mrs. Poshington.

== Death ==
Bernette lived in North London. She died on 12 January 2026, at the age of 94.

== Filmography ==
=== Television ===
Year	Title	Role	Notes
1955	Fabian of the Yard	—N/a	
1960	Arthur's Treasured Volumes	Agnes Barrett	with Arthur Askey
1961	The Angry Gods	Dorcas	
1962	Harpers West One	Pat Williams	
1963	Hancock	Canteen lady	with Tony Hancock
1963	Walter and Connie	Janet	
1963–1966	Hugh and I	Jimmy's mother	with Terry Scott and Hugh Lloyd
1964	Dave's Kingdom	—N/a	
1965	Crowther Takes a Look	—N/a	with Leslie Crowther
1967	Beggar My Neighbour	Olive	
1967–1969	The Black and White Minstrel Show	Regular singer	
1968	BBC Show of the Week	Herself	
1968	Two of a Kind	Herself	Three episodes; with Morecambe and Wise
1968–1983	The Good Old Days	Regular performer	
1968	The Morecambe and Wise Show	—	
1969	The Saturday Crowd	Singer	All 28 episodes
1970	Sandler and Young's Kraft Music Hall	Singer	
1970	From a Bird's Eye View	Mrs Cake	
1970	Crowther's Back in Town	—N/a	with Leslie Crowther
1971	The Leslie Crowther Show	Herself	
1972	Tarbuck's Luck	—N/a	with Jimmy Tarbuck
1972	The Dick Emery Show	—	4 episodes
1973	Shut That Door!	—N/a	with Larry Grayson
1973	Coronation Street	Sister Delaney	
1974	Candid Camera	Female joker	29 episodes
1976	Nobody Does it Like Marti	—N/a	with Marti Caine
1977	The Fall and Rise of Reginald Perrin	Gladys	
1978	Cooper, Just Like That	Tommy Cooper's stage assistant	
1979	Butterflies	Keep-fit instructor	
1981	The Ballyskillen Opera House	Annie O'Kelly	
1981	Saturday Night at the Mill	Performer	
1983	Punchlines!	Herself	
1987–1990	The Little and Large Show	—N/a	
1992	Virtual Murder	Mrs Hall	
1992	Uncle Jack	Miss Fortune	
1995	Agony Again	Faygey	
2001	The Queen's Nose	Gran's sister	
2008–2011	Hotel Trubble	Mrs. Poshington	Series regular; 39 episodes

=== Film ===
Year	Title	Role	Notes
1960	Sons and Lovers	Polly	
1961	Ticket to Paradise	Clarice	
1967	Daft as a Brush	—N/a	TV movie
1971	The Magnificent Seven Deadly Sins	Mrs Spencer	
1975	Eskimo Nell	Casting girl	
1975	Three for All	Rhoda	
1978	What's Up Nurse!	Mrs Garrard	
1986	Car Trouble	—N/a	
1987	Kin of the Castle	—N/a	TV movie
2009	Driving Aphrodite	Dorcas	

=== Documentaries ===
Year	Title	Role	Notes
1968	A Little of What You Fancy	Herself	Performer/singer (e.g., "She Was Poor But She Was Honest"); documentary on British Music Hall with revivals at the Players' Theatre
1994	This Is Your Life	Herself	Episode on Leslie Crowther
2010	Smile... This Was Candid Camera	Herself	TV special; 50th anniversary celebration of the UK Candid Camera (performer of theme song and featured as original prankster)
