= Sam Phillips (English actor) =

English actor (born 1984)

- Born: 31 May 1984 (age 42)
- Education: Guildhall School of Music and Drama
- Occupations: Actor, writer
- Notable work: Hotel Trubble; The Syndicate

Sam Phillips (born 31 May 1984) is an English actor and writer.

Phillips is the son of television director Nic Phillips and graduate of the Guildhall School of Music and Drama. Phillips is perhaps best known for his roles in children's comedy Hotel Trubble as Jamie and as Spencer Cavendish in the third series of Kay Mellor's The Syndicate starring alongside Anthony Andrews, Alice Krige, Lenny Henry, and Richard Rankin.

Phillips has also had roles in Far From The Madding Crowd, In The Flesh, Pete versus Life, Micro Men, My Family, EastEnders: E20, and The Crown. He guest stars in the Netflix hit Bridgerton series in season three as new character Lord Debling. He is a potential love interest and new suitor to the show's lead character, Penelope Featherington.

His theatre work includes the National Theatre production of The History Boys as Lockwood, Much Ado About Nothing at Shakespeare's Globe as Claudio and Bertram Cates in the acclaimed production of Inherit The Wind at the Old Vic where he starred alongside Kevin Spacey under the direction of Trevor Nunn.
