= Anglo European School =

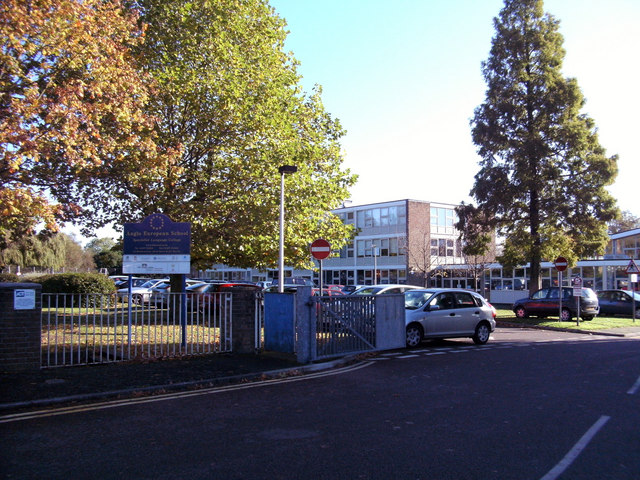

Location
- Willow Green; Ingatestone, Essex, CM4 0DJ; England; 51.67314°N 0.38640°E

Information
- Type: Academy/International School
- Motto: 'Making a World of difference'
- Established: 1973
- Department for Education URN: 137727 Tables
- Ofsted: Reports
- Headteachers: Jody Gee
- Gender: Co-educational
- Age: 11 to 19
- Enrolment: 1,307 pupils

Anglo European School is a self-governing, co-educational international academy school situated in Ingatestone, Essex. It is a school for boys and girls of all abilities, with 1,306 pupils aged 11 to 19. It was the first state school in Britain to offer the International Baccalaureate Diploma and the first to become a Language College. The school offers opportunities to travel abroad, often on exchanges and learn many languages such as French, German, Spanish, Russian, Japanese, Italian, Chinese and Arabic. The school became an academy in 2011, but still has languages as a specialism.

David Barrs and Jill Martin took over as headteachers of Anglo European School following the death of Bob Reed, who was headteacher at the time. They were officially appointed in 2006. With David Barrs leaving in 2021, the current headteacher is Jody Gee.

The school uses the twelve star European Flag as its crest and uses the phrase Making a World of difference as a motto. It is common to hear the school and its pupils and staff referred to as The Anglo Family.

== Notable former pupils ==
- David Abraham, Chief Executive of Channel 4
- Lydia Rose Bright, reality television star
- Annie Doble, Fashion Designer and Founder
- Ben Drew, known as Plan B, rapper
- Mario Falcone, reality television star
- James Harper, footballer
- John Heffernan, actor
- Nadine Lewington, actress
- Dan Wright, comedian
- Lotte Wubben-Moy, footballer
- Samuel Amo-Ameyaw, footballer

== See also ==
- List of international schools
