= Ibinabo Jack =

English actress

- Born: Wigan, England
- Education: St Peter's Catholic High School; Winstanley College; Mountview Academy of Theatre Arts
- Occupation: Actress
- Years active: 2015–present
- Television: Doctors; Vera

Ibinabo Jack is an English actress, known for her role as Theresa Sutton on the BBC soap opera Doctors (2019) and as DC Jacqueline Williams on the ITV crime drama television series Vera (2018–2023).

== Filmography ==
Year	Title	Role	Notes
2018–2023	Vera	DC Jacqueline 'Jac' Williams	Series regular
2018	Two for Joy	Policewoman	Film
2019	Warren	Mrs Taylor	Episode: The Father Figure
2019	Hollyoaks	Jessica	Episode: #1.5196
2019	Doctors	Theresa Sutton	Recurring role
2022	Big Cook, Little Cook	Big Cook Jen	Main role

== Stage ==
Year	Title	Role	Notes
2010	Legally Blonde	Pilar	Directed by Jerry Mitchell, Savoy Theatre, London
2015	Hot Stuff	Julie	Directed by Kevin Shaw, Oldham Coliseum, Oldham
2016	The Bodyguard	Ensemble/1st cover Nicki Marron	Directed by Thea Sharrock, UK Tour
2017	Dreamgirls	Lorrell Robinson	Directed by Casey Nicholaw, Savoy Theatre, London
2019	Our Lady of Kibeho by Katori Hall	Immaculée	Directed by James Dacre, Royal & Derngate Theatre, Northampton
2020	The High Table by Temi Wilkey	Leah/Adebisi	Directed by Daniel Bailey, The Bush Theatre, London
