= Daniel Kluger =

Israeli writer (1951–2025)

- Даниэль (Даниил) Мусеевич Клугер
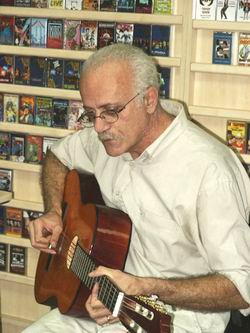
- Born: 8 October 1951; Simferopol, Ukrainian SSR, Soviet Union
- Died: 3 April 2025 (aged 73); Rehovot, Israel
- Occupation: Writer
- Writing career
- Language: Russian
- Genres: Science fiction, Detective fiction
- Notable works: The Cruel Sun (1989); The Silent Guest (1991); The Trap for the Sleuth (1998); Those Who Crossed the River (2000); The Baskerville Mystery (2005); Shylock's Last Act (2005)

Daniel (Daniil) Kluger (Russian: Даниэль (Даниил) Мусеевич Клугер; 8 October 1951 – 3 April 2025) was an Israeli writer in science fiction and detective genres. He wrote in Russian.

== Life and career ==
Daniel Kluger was born on 8 October 1951 in Simferopol, Ukrainian SSR (now Ukraine). He graduated from Simferopol State University as a physicist.

Kluger began to publish his works in the 1970s. He was the author of the books The Cruel Sun («Жестокое солнце», изд."Таврия", 1989), The Silent Guest («Молчаливый гость», «Текст», 1991), The Trap for the Sleuth («Западня для сыщика», «Искатель», 1998), Those Who Crossed the River («Перешедшие реку», ХАМА, 2000), as well as several detective novels, including Death in Caesarea («Смерть в Кесарии») and Unpredicted Murder («Непредсказанное убийство»). He also wrote an essay on the history of classical detective stories, The Baskerville Mystery («Баскервильская мистерия», «Текст», 2005).

His last work, Shylock's Last Act («Последний выход Шейлока», 2005) is a detective story that takes place in a Jewish ghetto during World War II, where heroes, witnesses and the murderer end their lives at Auschwitz.

Kluger died in Rehovot, Israel on 3 April 2025, at the age of 73.

== Bibliography ==
1. Daniel Kluger (1989). The Cruel Sun. Simpheropol: Tavria Publishers.
2. Daniel Kluger (1991). The Silent Guest. Moscow: Text.
3. Daniel Kluger (1998). The Trap for the Sleuth. Moscow: Iskatel.
4. Daniel Kluger (2000). To Cross the River. Jerusalem: CHAMA.
5. Daniel Kluger (2001). Death in Caesarea. Moscow: Vagrius.
6. Daniel Kluger (2001). The Deadly Masquerade. Moscow: Vagrius.
7. Daniel Kluger; Alexander Rybalka (2001). A Millennium on Loan. Moscow: Armada-Press.
8. Daniel Kluger (2002). Escape from the Art School. Moscow: Veche.
9. Daniel Kluger (2003). Magical Affairs. Moscow: AST-Astrel.
10. Daniel Kluger (2004). Satan's Harbor. Kiev: U kamina.
11. Daniel Kluger (2005). The Baskerville Mystery. Moscow: Text.
12. Daniel Kluger (2006). Shylock's Last Act. Moscow: Text.
13. Daniel Kluger; Vitali Babenko (2006). Liszt's Twentieth Rhapsody. Moscow: Club 36.6.
14. Daniel Kluger; Vitali Babenko (2007). Lilac's Fourth Victim. Moscow: Club 36.6.
15. Daniel Kluger (2010). Mystery of Captain Nemo. Lomonosov.
16. Daniel Kluger (2013). Flying In the Dark Chambers, Coming In the Night. Jerusalem: Milky Way.
