= Steve Marsh (comedian) =

British comedian

- Years active: 2003–present

Stephen "Steve" Marsh is a British actor, former co-host of the CBeebies programme Big Cook, Little Cook, and co-host of Space Hoppers. Marsh plays the part of the big cook, Ben. He and his Big Cook, Little Cook co-host Dan Wright form the comedy duo Electric Forecast. He also appeared in Wright's documentary F*** Off, I'm Ginger and as himself in Sky One's Crash Test Dummies during 2007.

From 10 July to 14 July 2007, Marsh and Wright were guest hosts on Big Brother's Big Mouth, and, in January 2008, the pair starred as feuding brothers in an episode of ITV drama Kingdom. He also had a part in Emmerdale as a policeman during the storyline involving Nick Henshall, who killed main character Viv Hope. He made two more appearances in Emmerdale in 2021 as Warren Tucker, the alcoholic dad of Ben Tucker.

He appears in the Ken Loach film Looking for Eric as the main antagonist, Zac. The film was released in June 2009 and co-stars Steve Evets, John Henshaw, and Eric Cantona. On 16 February 2007, Marsh and Wright starred in their own show, Crash Test Dummies, narrated by Brian Blessed.

In January 2012, he appeared in Hollyoaks as Graham Hardman. Marsh was involved in a human trafficking storyline that involved one of the soap's main characters, George Smith, and new character Phoebe Jackson from Kirkby, Liverpool.

He also presented Steve and Janine in the Morning on Rock FM in Lancashire.
