= The Osmonds (musical) =

2021 jukebox musical

- A New Musical
- Official poster
- Music: Various
- Lyrics: Various
- Book: Julian Bigg; Shaun Kerrison
- Basis: An autobiographical story by Jay Osmond
- Premiere: 3 February 2022: Curve Theatre, Leicester OFC Creations Theatre Center, Rochester NY
- Productions: 2022 UK and Ireland tour; 2027 US Regional premiere

The Osmonds is a musical based on the life and music of The Osmonds. The musical's story is by Jay Osmond and features a book by Julian Bigg and Shaun Kerrison.

== Synopsis ==
The musical tells the story of the five Osmond brothers, Alan, Wayne, Merrill, Jay and Donny from Utah in the 1970s who formed The Osmonds band selling 100 million records and winning 59 Gold and Platinum awards.

The production is written solely from Jay Osmond's perspective, as all of the other members of the family declined to assist him on the project. His brothers Alan and Merrill opted to write their own versions of the family life story in their autobiographies, released in 2024 and 2025, and Merrill endorsed a different stage production, Can You Hear the Music.

== Production ==
=== UK and Ireland tour (2022) ===
The musical had its world premiere at the Curve Theatre, Leicester on 3 February 2022 before touring the UK and Ireland until December 2022. The production is directed by Shaun Kerrison and features choreography by Bill Deamer, with Musical Supervision/Arrangements by Julian Bigg and Rich Morris. The musical was due to premiere in August 2021, however was postponed due to the COVID-19 pandemic. On 12 October 2021, the lead casting was announced. Full casting was announced on 11 January 2022.

=== U.S. premiere (2027) ===
The musical was set to make its American debut at the Covey Center for the Arts in Provo, Utah in March 2026, with an updated script, local cast and revamped staging. Jay Osmond stated his intent to take the show on a "North American leg" of a tour.

In January 2026, Osmond announced that the Covey Center had cancelled the production of the show and that Osmond would instead begin directly licensing the musical to community theater organizations and high schools, along with a different professional company.

In April 2027, OFC Creations in Rochester, New York will be the first regional theater to produce the show in the United States.

== Musical numbers ==
The musical features songs made famous by The Osmonds, including;

- "Love Me for a Reason"
- "Crazy Horses"
- "Let Me In"
- "Puppy Love"
- "One Bad Apple"
- "Long Haired Lover from Liverpool"
- "Paper Roses"
- "Yo-Yo"
- "Through the Years"
- "Down by the Lazy River"
- "Having a Party"

== Cast and characters ==
Character	Description	UK tour (2022)	North American Premiere (2027)
Merrill Osmond	The lead vocalist and bassist, the most business-oriented of the family.	Ryan Anderson	Daniel Levi Guest
Alan Osmond	The de facto behind-the-scenes leader of the group. He is depicted as struggling under the weight of his responsibilities.	Jamie Chatterton	Noah Alexander Price
Jay Osmond	The drummer of the group, who witnesses much of the activity from behind his drum set and is depicted as a peacemaker.	Alex Lodge	Lane Adam Williamson
Wayne Osmond	The guitarist of the group, and the driving force behind its rock and roll work.	Danny Nattrass	Anthony Lafornara
Donny Osmond	The keyboardist and youngest performing member of the quintet.	Joseph Peacock	Ben Orzell
Marie Osmond	The lone sister of the Osmond brothers.	Georgia Lennon	Brianna Ross
George Osmond	The father to all seven Osmond siblings.	Charlie Allen	Tripp Hanson
Olive Osmond	The mother to all seven Osmond siblings.	Nicola Bryan	Laura Jean Diekmann
Jimmy Osmond	The youngest of the Osmond siblings.	Tristan Whincup	Gianni Saverio
Young Merrill Osmond		Alfie Murray; Jasper Penny; Joey Unitt	
Young Alan Osmond		Jack Jones; Harvey Loakes; Charlie Stripp	
Young Jay Osmond		James Flintoff; Charlie Tumbridge; Tom Walsh	
Young Wayne Osmond		Alfie Jones; Austin Redwood; Thomas Ryan	
Young Donny Osmond		Matthias Green; Osian Salter; Nicholas Teixeira	
Young Jimmy Osmond		Fraser Fowkes; Austin Riley; Harrison Skinner	
Ensemble	Three men and three women.	Alex Cardall; Henry Firth; Alex Hardford; Katy Hards; Aidan Harkins; Luke Hogan; Lotus Lowry; Stephanie McKenzie; Jay Osborne; Samuel Routley; Tristan Whincup; Peter Bindloss	Kamarah Gilbert Abigail Graham Lillian Jarzabek Nicholas Ford Kinney Maxwell Parmelee Brianna Ross Kameron Sturdivant Gianni Saverio Ray Trim
