= Osmond (surname) =

Osmond is a surname of English and Norman origin. It is derived from Anglo-Saxon and / or Norman, itself from Old Norse Osmundr; Old English Osmund, a variant form of Old Norse Ásmundr.

== Osmond family ==
- The Osmond family, a Mormon family from Ogden, Utah whose members formed American pop group The Osmonds
  - First generation:
    - George Osmond (politician) (1836–1913), English-American politician
  - Third generation:
    - George Virl Osmond, Sr. (1917–2007), Osmond family patriarch
    - Olive Osmond (1925–2004), wife of George V. Osmond
  - Fourth generation:
    All children of George V. and Olive Osmond
    - Virl Osmond (George Virl Osmond, Jr., born 1945), choreographer and missionary
    - Tom Osmond (born 1947), missionary and postal worker
    - Alan Osmond (1949–2026), multi-instrumentalist and songwriter
    - Wayne Osmond (1951–2025), guitarist and songwriter
    - Merrill Osmond (born 1953), lead vocalist, bassist and songwriter
    - Jay Osmond (born 1955), drummer and choreographer
    - Donny Osmond (born 1957), keyboardist and vocalist
    - Marie Osmond (born 1959), country singer and Broadway actress
    - Jimmy Osmond (born 1963), vocalist and businessman
  - Fifth generation:
    - Aaron Osmond (born 1969), politician and former member of Utah State senate, son of Virl
    - David Osmond (born 1979), musician and television personality, son of Alan

== Other people ==
- Andrew Osmond (journalist)
- Andrew Osmond (novelist)
- Andrew Osmond (satirist)
- Antony Osmond, member of The Barron Knights
- Cliff Osmond, American actor and screenwriter
- Douglas Osmond, British Chief Constable
- Floris Osmond, French engineer
- Frank Osmond, Welsh rugby union and rugby league footballer
- Humphry Osmond, British psychiatrist
- JoAnn D. Osmond, American politician from Illinois
- John Osmond, director of the Institute of Welsh Affairs
- Kaetlyn Osmond, Canadian figure skater
- Ken Osmond (1943–2020), American actor
- Margy Osmond, Australian businesswoman
- Timothy H. Osmond, American politician from Illinois, husband of JoAnn
- William Osmond, 19th-century English sculptor

== See also ==
- Osmond (disambiguation)
- Osmund
- Osmont
- Osment
- Osman (name)
