= Side by Side (1982 film) =

- Also known as: Side by Side: The True Story of the Osmond Family
- Genre: Biography; Drama
- Screenplay by: E.F. Wallengren
- Story by: Tom Lazarus
- Directed by: Russ Mayberry
- Starring: Marie Osmond; Joseph Bottoms
- Music by: George Aliceson Tipton
- Country of origin: United States
- Original language: English

Production
- Executive producer: Deanne Barkley
- Producers: Richard A. Briggs; Don Garrison
- Production location: Provo, Utah
- Cinematography: Roland Ozzie Smith
- Editors: Fred A. Chulack; Milton Swift
- Running time: 100 mins.
- Production company: Osmond Entertainment Productions

Original release
- Network: NBC
- Release: April 26, 1982

Related
- Inside the Osmonds

Side by Side: The True Story of the Osmond Family is a 1982 American made-for-television biographical film about the earlier years of the famed entertainment family, starring Marie Osmond as matriarch Olive Osmond, and Joseph Bottoms as patriarch George Osmond. This film was released on VHS tape in 1998 but has never had an official DVD issue.

Side by Side would be followed 19 years later by Inside the Osmonds, which focuses on the family's breakthrough years as pop stars with an entirely new cast.

== Plot ==
The film focuses on the early life of the Osmond Brothers and how they became successful musicians. It also highlights the origins of their parents George Osmond and Olive Davis from as early as World War II. The Osmonds' voices are heard on songs such as "I'm a Ding Dong Daddy from Dumas", "I Wouldn't Trade The Silver in My Mother's Hair", "Be My Little Baby Bumble Bee", and "Side by Side".

At the end of the film, the video of the Osmonds singing "Side by Side" on The Andy Williams Show in 1962 is shown briefly, followed by a montage of vintage photos clips of the family. As the montage progresses, more clips of the family are shown over the years, leading up to the present timeframe. Also, the song turns to a newly updated show-stopping version of "Side by Side", performed by the Osmonds (including Donny, Marie and Jimmy) on stage. Their parents (played by themselves) are watching in attendance and admiring their performance.

== Cast ==
- Marie Osmond as Olive Osmond
- Joseph Bottoms as George Osmond
- Karen Alston as Belva
- Cheryl Chase as Marianne (credited as Cheryl Hudock)
- Scott Wilkinson as Lt. Goetz
- David Eaves as Virl
- Shane Chournos as Tom
- Daryl Bingham as Young Alan
- Todd Dutson as Alan
- Brian Poelman as Young Wayne
- Vince Massa as Wayne
- Spencer Alston as Young Merrill
- Shane Wallace as Merrill
- Jason Sanders as Young Jay
- Jeremy Haslam as Jay
- Jamon Rivera as Young Donny

In addition to Marie Osmond, other members of The Osmond family including:

- Travis Osmond (Merrill Osmond's son) as Young Virl
- Justin Osmond (Merrill Osmond's son) as Young Tom; Justin was born deaf like his uncles Virl and Tom
- Amy Osmond (Wayne Osmond's daughter) as Young Marie

== Production ==
Parts of the film were shot in Orem, Utah, at Osmond Studios.
