= Inside the Osmonds =

- Promotional Poster
- Genre: Biography; Drama; Music
- Written by: Matt Dorff
- Directed by: Neill Fearnley
- Starring: Bruce McGill; Veronica Cartwright
- Theme music composer: Patrick Williams
- Country of origin: United States
- Original language: English

Production
- Executive producers: Matt Dorff; Merv Griffin; Jimmy Osmond; Mark Sennet; Robert M. Sertner; Frank von Zerneck
- Producers: Richard Fischoff; Randy Sutter
- Cinematography: David Geddes
- Editor: Scott Vickrey
- Running time: 100 minutes
- Production companies: Merv Griffin Entertainment; Mark Sennett Productions von Zerneck-Sertner Films; Hallmark Entertainment

Original release
- Network: ABC
- Release: February 5, 2001

Related
- Side by Side: The True Story of the Osmond Family

Inside the Osmonds is a 2001 ABC-TV movie about the personal lives and professional careers of The Osmonds, and how the stresses and strains of their careers and the turbulent 1970s and 1980s affected their relationships with each other and their families. The ending that takes place in January 2001 features a special appearance by the real Osmonds.

Inside the Osmonds was the second biopic of the Osmond family, following 19 years after the 1982 film Side by Side: The True Story of the Osmond Family, which had focused on the family's earlier years.

== Main cast ==
- Bruce McGill — George Osmond
- Veronica Cartwright — Olive Osmond
- Milton Bruchanski — Virl Osmond
- Shane Davison — Tom Osmond
- Joel Berti — Alan Osmond
- Jason Knight — Wayne Osmond
- Ryan G. Kirkpatrick — Merrill Osmond
- Miklos Perlus — Jay Osmond
- Thomas Dekker — Donny Osmond (younger)
- Patrick Levis — Donny Osmond (older)
- Taylin Wilson — Marie Osmond (younger)
- Janaya Stephens — Marie Osmond (older)
- Taylor Abrahamse — Jimmy Osmond (younger)
- Trevor Blumas — Jimmy Osmond (older)
- Tammy Gillis — Mary Osmond (Merrill's wife)
