= Ozment =

Ozment is a surname. Notable people with the surname include:

- Dennis Ozment (born 1945), American politician
- Steven Ozment (1939–2019), American historian

== See also ==
- Osment
- Osmond (surname)
