= Osmond =

Osmond or Osmonds may refer to:

== People ==
- Osmond (surname)
- Osmund, a list of people with the given name Osmond or Osmund

== Arts and entertainment ==
- Gilbert Osmond, in the novel The Portrait of a Lady, by Henry James
- Osmond Bates, in Sahara, a war movie, and the 1995 remake
- The Osmonds, an American family music group
  - Osmonds (album), their third album
  - The Osmonds (TV series), a 1972 cartoon series starring the Osmonds
  - The Osmonds (musical), a 2022 stage musical based on the family
  - Osmond Studios, a television production studio in Utah used by the Osmonds

== Places ==
- Osmond, Nebraska, United States, a city
- Osmond, Wyoming, United States, a census-designated place
- Osmond, Newfoundland and Labrador, Canada
- Melbury Osmond, Dorset, England

== See also ==
- Osmond process, a way to make wrought iron starting around the 13th century
- Åsmund (disambiguation)
- Osmund (disambiguation)
