= Jimmy Osmond =

American singer (born 1963)

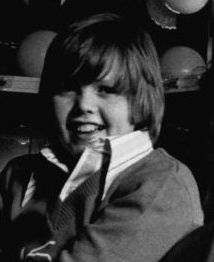
- Osmond in 1974
- Born: James Arthur Osmond; April 16, 1963 (age 63); Canoga Park, California, U.S.
- Other name: Little Jimmy Osmond
- Occupations: Singer; actor; businessman
- Years active: 1967–2018
- Spouse: Michelle Larson (m. 1991)
- Children: 4
- Parents: George Osmond; Olive Davis
- Musical career
- Genres: Pop
- Instruments: Vocals; bass
- Labels: MGM; Kolob; Uni; Denon; Polydor
- Formerly of: The Osmonds

James Arthur Osmond (born April 16, 1963) is an American singer and businessman. He is the youngest member of the sibling musical group the Osmonds. As a solo artist, Osmond has accumulated six gold records, one platinum record, and two gold albums. He is best known for the 1972 Christmas number one "Long Haired Lover from Liverpool".

== Early life and family ==
He was born in Canoga Park, California, the ninth and last child of Olive and George Osmond. His older siblings are Virl, Tom, Alan, Wayne, Merrill, Jay, Donny, and Marie. He is the only one of the nine Osmond siblings not to have been born in the family's hometown of Ogden, Utah. He was taught by tutors to accommodate his professional life. He was also educated by Mary Osmond, his brother Merrill's wife.

== Career ==
He received his first gold record at age five for a song he recorded in Japanese, "My Little Darling". He was the first Osmond to achieve this. His recording of "Long Haired Lover from Liverpool" in 1972 resulted in The Guinness Book of World Records designating him the youngest performer to have a #1 single on the UK Singles Chart. He was known as "Little Jimmy". The song was credited to "Little Jimmy Osmond". In Japan, he had the moniker "Jimmy Boy".

In 1978, Osmond starred in the feature film The Great Brain. He starred in other acting roles as well, including two episodes of the TV series Fame. He performed on stage and television often with his older siblings. In 1985, he met Latino impresario Manuel Montoya at A&M Records, and this led to his only Spanish recording, "Siempre Tu". He toured Latin American markets, including Puerto Rico, Mexico, Venezuela and Chile. On the heels of this, he served as a juror at the 1986 edition of the OTI Festival. The 2012 Osmonds album I Can't Get There Without You was performed with Jimmy Osmond on lead vocals; it was the first album to feature Jimmy as lead singer, as older brother Merrill Osmond historically held that role in the band. In live performances, Jimmy often serves as a co-lead singer with Merrill, a role previously held by Donny during the band's heyday in the early 1970s.

Osmond is president of Osmond Entertainment. He has developed and supervised most of the Osmonds' merchandising business, as well as producing hundreds of hours of programming for networks including ABC, PBS, the BBC and the Disney Channel.

He has also performed in musical theater. Like his brother Donny and nephew David many years earlier, he starred in Joseph and the Amazing Technicolor Dreamcoat. He also starred in Boogie Nights in 2004 at the Grand Theatre, Blackpool. In 2005, Jimmy Osmond's American Jukebox Show toured the UK in 2005, again to the Grand Theatre in Blackpool. Co-stars of the show included Billy Pearce and Jimmy's brothers Jay and Wayne. From December 11, 2010 to January 2, 2011, he played Buttons in Cinderella at the White Rock Theatre in Hastings; from December 16, 2011, to January 15, 2012, he played the role of Wishee Washee in Aladdin at Grand Theatre, Swansea; and from December 1, 2017, to January 7, 2018, the role of Abanzar in the pantomime Aladdin at His Majesty's Theatre in Aberdeen.

He has appeared on several UK TV shows, including the reality TV series I'm a Celebrity... Get Me Out of Here! broadcast by ITV in 2005 (he finished in fourth place), a 2006 appearance on All Star Family Fortunes, a celebrity version of Come Dine with Me, Celebrity Family Fortunes, and Everybody Dance Now. In January 2010, Osmond participated in the British ITV1 celebrity reality television programme Popstar to Operastar. In 2016 Jimmy was a finalist on the UK version of Celebrity Masterchef.

In 2014, Osmond authored a semi-autobiographical children's picture book, Awesome Possum Family Band. The same year, he took over the operations of the Andy Williams Moon River Theatre in Branson, Missouri, where he took charge of producing and booking shows. In 2015, Osmond was awarded an honorary doctorate of arts and humanities by Iowa Wesleyan University. The first Osmond family member to receive that distinction, he delivered the keynote commencement speech on May 9, 2015.

== Personal life ==
On December 27, 2018, following his performance as Captain Hook in the Birmingham Hippodrome's staging of the pantomime Peter Pan, Osmond was taken to the hospital where he was diagnosed with having had a stroke. Osmond finished the performance before going to the hospital. He had previously suffered a stroke in 2004 caused by a since-corrected patent foramen ovale. He spoke publicly for the first time since the stroke in April 2019, stating that he was in good health and was taking a "long-overdue break" from show business for the time being. He has not spoken publicly since then but has continued to operate his businesses including the Andy Williams Performing Arts Center until its 2022 closure. In a February 2020 interview, Jimmy's brother Merrill stated that Jimmy continued to recover, still planned on maintaining his business ventures, and that Merrill hoped that Jimmy would eventually return to the group. Jimmy did become President of Osmond Entertainment. As of 2024, he was, according to his nephew Nathan, happily retired and "enjoying life as a family man."

He married his wife, Michelle Larson, in 1991. They have four children. Their names are Sophie, Zachary, Wyatt and Bella.

== Discography ==
=== Albums ===
- Little Jimmy Osmond (Japan, 1972)
- Killer Joe (1972) (# 105 Hot 200)
- Little Arrows (1975)
- Kimi Wa Pretty (Japan, 1981)
- Siempre Tu (in Spanish; Mexico, 1985)
- Keep the Fire Burnin’ (US 2000, UK 2001)
- Moon River & Me (2016)

=== Singles ===
Year	Single Both sides from same album except where indicated	Peak chart positions			Album
Year	Single Both sides from same album except where indicated	US	AUS	UK	Album
1971	"If Santa Were My Daddy" b/w "Silent Night"		-		Non-album tracks
1972	"Long Haired Lover from Liverpool"	38	2	1	Killer Joe
1972	"Mother of Mine"	101	-		Killer Joe
1972	"Tweedle Dee" b/w "Mama'd Know What to Do"	59	25	4	Killer Joe
1974	"Yes Virginia, There Is a Santa Claus" b/w "If Santa Were My Daddy"		-		Non-album tracks
1974	"I'm Gonna Knock on Your Door" b/w "Give Me a Good Old Mammy Song"		93	11	Little Arrows
1974	"Little Arrows" b/w "Don't You Remember"		-	54	Little Arrows
1978	"Theme from 'The Great Brain' (You're There)" b/w "Life Is Just What You Make It" (non-album track)		-		"The Great Brain" soundtrack
1980	"She Put the Light On" b/w "Uncertain"		-		Kimi Wa Pretty

=== Singles released in other countries ===
- "My Little Darling" / "Peg o' My Heart" (Japan)
- "Chuk Chuk" / "Jimmy's Lullaby" (Japan)
- "Jingle Bells" / "I Saw Mommy Kissing Santa Claus" (Japan)
- "Red Roses for a Blue Lady" (Sweden)
- "Happy Robbers" / "I Found a Little Happiness" (Japan)
- "Goodbye Mr. Tears" / "Put Your Hand in the Hand"
- "Kimi Wa Pretty" / "Tokyo Savannah" (Japan)
- "Long Distance" / "After All" (Japan)
- "Living in Love" / "One More Chance" (Japan)
- "Siempre Tu" (Mexico)
- "Dos en Uno" (Mexico)
- "Otono y Primavera" / "Tu Me Haces Falta" (Mexico)
- "Shine"

=== Soundtracks ===
- The Osmonds (animated TV series, 1972)
- Yes Virginia, There Is a Santa Claus (1974)
- Hugo the Hippo (1976)
- The Great Brain (1978)

== Filmography ==
=== Television ===
- The Osmonds (1972) – animated TV series
- The NBC Saturday Morning Preview Revue (1974)
- Donny & Marie (1976–1979)
- Nichiyō Owarai Gekijyō (日曜お笑い劇場; lit. "Sunday Comedy Theater") (1981) - Nippon TV
- Fame (1982)
- The Love Boat (1982)
- The Love Boat (1985)
- Inside the Osmonds (2001)
- We Are Family (2003)
- Branson Jubilee (2005)
- I'm a Celebrity... Get Me Out of Here! (2005)
- All Star Family Fortunes (2006)
- Celebrity Come Dine with Me
- Never Mind The Buzzcocks (2011)
- Celebrity Bedlam (2012)
- Celebrity MasterChef (2016)
- Celebrity Antiques Road Trip (2016)
- Countdown (2017)
- A Christmas Chase: Celebrity Special (2017)
- Celebrity Pointless (2017)

=== Films ===
- The Great Brain (1978) based on the book by John D. Fitzgerald, portraying title character.
- Hugo the Hippo (1976), singer

== Books ==
- Osmond, Jimmy (2014). Awesome Possum Family Band. Illustrations by Bob Ostrom. Washington, D.C.: Regnery Kids. ISBN 9781621572114. LCCN 2014003306. OCLC 854611747.
