= Andrew Osmond =

Andrew Osmond may refer to:

- Andrew Osmond (journalist)
- Andrew Osmond (novelist)
- Andrew Osmond (satirist)
