= Wonderama =

American television series

- Genre: Variety show
- Presented by: various (see below)
- Opening theme: "I Ain't Down Yet"
- Ending theme: "Kids Are People Too" (1967–1977)
- Country of origin: United States
- No. of seasons: 26

Production
- Production location: New York City
- Running time: 1955: 6 hours; 1955–1977: Sunday version: 3 hours; ?–1970: weekday version: 1 hour; 1977: 2 hours; 1980–1987; 2017–present: 1 hour

Original release
- Release: September 25, 1955 – December 25, 1977
- Release: 1980 – 1987
- Release: December 25, 2016 – present

Wonderama is a children's television program that originally aired on the Metromedia-owned stations from 1955 to 1977. The show was revived from 1980 to 1987, and again in 2016.

== Hosts ==
- Al Hodge (as Captain Video 1955–1956)
- Jon Gnagy (mid–late 1950s)
- Sandy Becker (1955–56)
- Chuck McCann (1955–56)
- Pat Meikle (co-hosting 1955–1956)
- Herb Sheldon (1956–1958)
- Bill Britten (co-host in 1958; later known as New York's Bozo the Clown)
- Doris Faye (co-host in 1958)
- Sonny Fox (1959–1967)
- Bob McAllister (1967–1977)
- various teenagers (1980–1987)
- David Osmond (2017–present)

== Original series ==
Wonderama aired on its originating station, WABD in New York City, and later also in five other markets in which Metromedia owned television stations: WTTG in Washington D.C., KMBC-TV in Kansas City, KTTV in Los Angeles, WXIX-TV in Cincinnati, and WTCN-TV in Minneapolis – Saint Paul. Originally running for six hours, the show would eventually last three hours long for most of its run on Sunday mornings. The show was originally hosted by actor-comedian Sandy Becker, who became a New York children's program star in his own right, with Pat Meikle making a cooking segment and a fashion presentation.

In September 1969, Wonderama added a one-hour weekday version in addition to the Sunday show, which by then ran three hours. The weekday program lasted until 1970.

The show scaled back to two hours in September 1977, before WNEW canceled it in November of that year. The last produced show was taped on December 15, before airing on December 25. In an interview on WNEW's local talk show Midday with Bill Boggs on the day of Wonderama's cancellation, host Bob McAllister claimed to have no idea why the show ended, while a Metromedia spokesman said that the programme was dropped due to declining ratings. However, in a 1993 interview with the Pennsylvania newspaper The Morning Call, McAllister stated that an advertisement that he bought in The New York Times telling viewers to stop watching Wonderama might have led to the program's cancellation. McAllister bought the Times ad after he became upset when an ad for the 1972 Charles Bronson movie The Mechanic aired during the show. "When I was doing Wonderama," McAllister said, "I always made sure that there was never any violence within the framework of the show. They claimed that the ads were computer programmed, but I didn't buy it. I took out a full-page $10,000 ad in The New York Times warning parents not to let their children watch the show. Unfortunately, I bummed myself out of broadcasting permanently with that little faux pas, but I still stand by it."

After its cancellation, Wonderama continued in two-hour Sunday morning reruns from January 1978 to June 1980. McAllister reportedly was unhappy with edits to the reruns, which usually eliminated celebrity performances in order to avoid having to pay royalties.

=== The Sonny Fox years ===
Independent television network Metromedia (born from the former DuMont Network) hired Fox to host Wonderama on its New York flagship station WNEW-TV, succeeding the team of Bill Britten and Doris Faye. Hiring Fox ended what some called the "musical-hosts syndrome" that Wonderama had for its first few years. Fox became Wonderama's sole host for eight years, until August 1967.

During this time, Fox made countless personal appearances throughout the New York metropolitan area. The Wonderama show was featured at the Hollywood Arena at the Freedomland U.S.A. theme park in The Bronx. Several shows at Freedomland were filmed and broadcast on the following Sunday mornings.

=== The Bob McAllister years ===
Following the frequent turnover of hosts throughout the 1950s, Wonderama experienced its greatest viewership by way of one-time Baltimore kids' show host Bob McAllister, who replaced Sonny Fox as host in 1967 and remained in that role until 1977. Each show's taping included features like education, music, audience participation, games, interviews, and cartoon shorts.

The program aired for three hours, including several breaks to allow for cartoon insertions. On most of Metromedia's stations, these would be Warner Bros. cartoons from the 1940s and 1950s. On KMBC in Kansas City, an ABC affiliate, the show only ran two hours without the cartoon inserts since this station did not own broadcast rights to cartoon shorts.

The program's closing theme song, sung by McAllister, was called "Kids Are People Too", which was later adapted as the show's title when ABC picked it up as a Sunday morning kids show. The song was also featured on an album of music from Wonderama by McAllister called Oh, Gee, it's Great to be a Kid.

==== Features ====
Popular features of Wonderama during the McAllister years included the following:

- "Snake Cans": the classic game in which Bob would pick kids from the audience one by one to open one of ten cans, nine of which were filled with spring-loaded "snakes". The tenth one contained an artificial flower bouquet, which earned the holder the grand prize (usually a Ross Apollo bicycle), along with other prizes for answering trivia questions.
- "Wonderama A Go-Go" (later called "Disco City", and currently known as "Dance Emergency"): a dance contest similar in style to American Bandstand, in which the best dancer won a prize. After it was renamed "Disco City", each contestant did his or her own dance to the same record; the record was introduced at the beginning of the segment by The Disco Kid, a boy dressed in a costume reminiscent of The Lone Ranger. Originally, The Disco Kid's theme was a loop of the chorus from The Raspberries' "Overnight Sensation", but this was later replaced with the song "Ride On, Disco Kid".
- "Does Anybody Here Have an Aardvark?": a song which Bob sang before a segment asking members of the audience to produce unusual objects for prizes. This usually occurred at the beginning of the show.
- "Exercise, Exercise!": this most often included jumping jacks and three-way burpees, involving all the kids in the audience. The segment had its own theme song:

Exercise, exercise!
Come on everybody do your exercise!
Exercise, exercise!
Come on everybody do your exercise!

- "Good News": audience members were selected to read "good" news items from around the country before McAllister sang a song:

Have you heard any good news today, today?
I wanna hear what you have to say,
wait till I get to the count of three,
and tell me all the good news you have for me, one-two-three!

After singing, Bob would ask audience members for their own good news.

- "Guess Your Best": a game show segment in which three contestants made predictions of the outcome of audience polls and relay races. McAllister hosted the game, using the pseudonym Bert Beautiful.
- "Eye Spy" (aka "Disguise Delimit"): A masquerade game, in which five pre-selected kids, all pretending to be the same person and all wearing the same type of costume, were ushered on stage, and an audience member was selected to figure out which one was the actual person.
- "Whose is Whose is Whose": contestants were introduced to four children and four adults, and had to guess which adult was which child's father. To help, the children and parents were sometimes asked to do things such as jump up in the air (ostensibly because a child and his parent might jump in a similar style). McAllister adopted a silly pseudonym for this segment as well, calling himself either Chuck Chuckles or Chuck Roast.
- "Head Of The House": selected kids took part in a series of quirky competitions, including gerbil races, balloon-breaking contests, and so forth. The child who won the most events or scored the most points was crowned the Head of the House.

==== Parting gifts ====
Each week, audience members received a package of parting gifts as detailed on the show, containing varying items, including the following:

- A Lactona toothbrush
- An issue of Dynamite Magazine or Golden Magazine
- A supply of Good Humor ice cream
- A box of Hostess Twinkies
- A 6-pack of RC Cola
- A Goo Goo Cluster candy bar
- A tube of Hold! cough lozenges
- A package of Fruit Stripe Gum
- A gift certificate for Burger King or McDonald's
- Nandy Candy, a chocolate bar containing fruit (McAllister would stretch out the pronunciation, i.e., "Naaaandy Caaaaandy")
- A pack of Lender's Bagelettes; each child also got a necklace made from a real, shellacked Lenders Bagelette, which had either their name or their last initial painted on it
- A 45 rpm record of one of the music artists who had performed on the Wonderama episode that week
- Harvey Comics comic books

==== Guests ====
Top stars from all genres of entertainment (music, movies, television, etc.) made appearances on New York-based Wonderama, including the following:

- Southside Johnny and the Asbury Jukes
- The Sylvers
- BT Express
- ABBA
- Jerry Lewis
- Jodie Foster
- Van Halen
- Neil Sedaka
- Roger Daltrey
- David Cassidy
- Muhammad Ali and Joe Frazier: in a build-up to their rematch bout, Ali and Frazier appeared in January 1974, competing in a game of marbles.
- José Feliciano
- The Jackson 5
- Monty Python
- The Amazing Randi
- DeForest Kelley
- Leif Garrett
- Soupy Sales
- Billy Crystal
- Wolfman Jack
- Lena Zavaroni
- Eddie Money
- Evel Knievel
- The Bay City Rollers
- Ann B. Davis
- Rosey Grier
- Doug Henning
- Gladys Knight & The Pips
- Grandmaster Flash and the Furious Five
- Melba Moore
- Don McLean
- Richard Rodgers
- Maria Von Trapp
- Marvin Hamlisch
- Penny Marshall
- Cindy Williams
- Will Geer
- Tracy Austin
- Johnny Bench
- Reggie Jackson
- Walt Frazier
- Don Newcombe
- the cast of Annie
- Scott Baio
- Donovan
- Eddie Kendricks
- Van McCoy
- Tavares
- Kenny Rankin
- Abraham Beame
- Sam Savitt
- Lee Salk
- Henry Heimlich
- David Essex
- The Hues Corporation
- Joanne Worley
- Joe Raposo
- Jacques Cousteau
- Sister Sledge
- Paul Williams
- Burt Bacharach
- Melissa Manchester
- Kiki Dee
- Billy Preston
- Ray Stevens
- Bob Keeshan
- Harry Chapin
- Pearl Bailey
- Dick Van Dyke
- The cast of Grease
- The Muppets
- Jim Henson
- Tim Moore
- Rodney Dangerfield
- George Barris
- Al Flosso
- Ann Reinking
- Dick Clark
- Don Most
- Colonel Sanders
- Mark Wilson
- Arthur Ashe
- Billie Jean King
- Ringling Bros. and Barnum & Bailey Circus
- Marcel Marceau
- Vanilla Fudge
- Kool & the Gang
- Elton John
- Kiss
- Mac Davis
- Dolenz, Jones, Boyce & Hart

== 1980 revival ==
Beginning in 1980, a documentary magazine show for children, hosted by teens, ran on Sunday mornings on WNEW-TV. While this show retained the Wonderama title, it bore no resemblance to the original. This hour-long incarnation ran until 1983; reruns edited to 30 minutes aired from 1984 to 1986 on WNEW-TV/WNYW on Saturday mornings. Hosts included Pam Potillo and J.D. Roth. Guests included Rick Schroeder, Stacy Lattisaw, and the Sugarhill Gang.

== 2017 revival ==
A new version of Wonderama, hosted by David Osmond, debuted on WPIX-TV in New York with "A Wonderama Christmas" special on December 25, 2016, followed by a national rollout on Tribune Broadcasting stations on January 8, 2017. The series has since returned to WNYW and its sister station, WWOR-TV and airs weekly via syndication. New episodes, under the name Wonderama Wonder Games, were produced in 2024.

The new revival features classic segments (such as the popular "Snake in a Can" game) alongside new show elements including "Wonder-mojis," "Cool Science" and "DJ Dance Emergency" featuring DJs Coco and Breezy, with "DJ Dance Emergency" being a revamp of "Wonderama A Go-Go" / "Disco City" from the classic show. Season 1 of the revival featured 16 episodes.

== See also ==
- Kids Are People Too, created and initially hosted by Bob McAllister, 1978 to 1982 on ABC
- Total Panic, a show with a similar premise.
