= Bill Britten =

American actor (1928–2020)

- Born: William Cohen; 1928; Philadelphia, Pennsylvania, U.S.
- Died: February 4, 2020 (aged 91 or 92)
- Education: University of Washington
- Occupations: Actor; Opera singer; Teacher
- Spouse: Mary Louise Jones

William Cohen (1928 – February 4, 2020) was an American actor born in Philadelphia, to an opera actor and singer. As Bill Britten, he is best known for his portrayal of Bozo the Clown in the New York City market.

== College education and early career ==
Britten performed as a mimic and pantomimist for local parties in Philadelphia to finance his college education. He earned a degree in drama at Temple University. After serving in the U.S. Army, where he wrote, performed and produced shows for Special Services, he earned a Master's Degree in drama at the University of Washington in Seattle. He taught speech and drama at a Seattle high school, performed on local television, appeared as a clown for a local gas station franchise and trained with two puppet theaters funded by the University of Washington.

Following his college education, Britten studied puppetry with Frank Paris, who created and was puppeteer for the original Howdy Doody marionette that appeared on Puppet Playhouse Presents.

Britten later was employed by a resort in New England (either New Hampshire or Vermont). According to television children's programming historian Kevin Butler, Britten conveyed to Butler during a 1980s interview that he had worked for “Wantashanta Lodge on glorious Lake Winemesote” (neither have been documented and this could have been a Britten joke) as a toomler, a Yiddish word explained as someone who takes the initiative to make things happen. It was during this time, according to Britten, that he was assigned by the lodge management to perform comedy skits and to create many games and activities for the benefit of the guests. Working with the staff, Britten and his fellow toomlers created ”Can You Top This?” night, a friendly competition allowing guests and Britten to attempt to tell the funniest jokes. Britten also played guitar and likely included his musical talent as part of the entertainment. This experience, along with reading books and magazines that featured ideas, games, craft making and hobbies, aided Britten in developing activities that he utilized later on television shows such as Time For Fun, Wonderama, Bozo The Clown and The Bozo’s Big Top Circus Show.

Britten's sources for creating and performing comedic ideas also included old movie comedies that he watched at a theater in Philadelphia and, years later, at a film history society run by film historian, author and lecturer William K.Everson. Britten also listened to popular radio comedy series of the 1930s and 1940s. He became a fan of Eddie Cantor, ”Baron Munchhausen”(portrayed by Jack Pearl), Ed Wynn and many other well-known comedy performers. He watched Your Show of Shows and was inspired by the comedy skits and characters created by Sid Caesar.

== Career in New York television ==
Britten moved to New York City to work in nightclubs. At about this time, he met ventriloquist Doris Faye and they formed Britten-Faye Productions. One of their joint creations was Britten's tramp clown character Prof. Okey Dokey. As the tramp clown, Britten entered and won the Funniest New Clown Of The Year audition with the Ringling Brothers and Barnum & Bailey Circus, besting approximately 400 other candidates. He received national publicity as the schoolteacher turned clown after performing a pantomime routine in which he attempted to sit in a collapsible chair. Britten performed with the circus at Madison Square Garden during the spring of 1954. He remained in the city when the circus moved to the next destination on its itinerary.

Britten made his first television appearance during 1955 (several sources give the year as 1954) on WJZ-TV (later WABC-TV) for the "Jolly Gene And His Fun Machine" show.

Britten succeeded Herb Sheldon on August 10, 1958 to become the host of WABD's (later WNEW-TV and now WNYW-TV) "Wonderama" program. It was the first children's show to be taped before a live studio audience. Britten initially hosted the show as "Three Gun Willie The Kid" and he was accompanied by Doris Faye's "Princess Ticklefeather" character. Britten's character, however, proved unpopular and was dropped from the show. Britten also hosted "The Looney Tunes Show" on Saturday nights from August 9, 1958 until August 30, 1958, and the weekday evenings "Bugs Bunny Presents" and "Funnytoones" shows at the same station until his December 1958 departure.

On Monday, September 14, 1959, Britten moved to WPIX-TV in New York City and began to portray the character "Bozo the Clown" for "The Bozo Show" that aired until March 1, 1963. On March 4, the series changed time slots and was renamed "Bozo's Big Top Circus". This show lasted until June 2, 1963. During this period, Britten also hosted the Saturday morning cartoon show "The Cartoon Express", from October 13 to November 3 of 1962. Faye joined him on these shows as "Princess Ticklefeather."

Britten's last show was "Bozo's Cartoon Circus Lunchtime Show". The program was broadcast from June 24, 1963 until August 14, 1964, marking the end of his involvement with children's television.

== Programming, teaching, broadway, film ==
Following his work in front of the camera, Britten served as a programming director for WNYC and as a drama teacher at Performing Arts High School in New York City. He also appeared on Broadway, most notably as the Barber in the original Broadway production of Man of La Mancha alongside Robert Rounsville and Richard Kiley. Britten also appeared in the 1980 film Fame as drama teacher Mr. England.

== Personal life ==
Britten was married to Mary Louise Jones for 48 years. He died on February 4, 2020.
