= Little Arrows (album) =

Studio album by Jimmy Osmond
- Released: 1975
- Recorded: 1974
- Studio: MGM Recording Studios, Kolob Studios
- Genre: Pop; bubblegum pop
- Label: MGM
- Producer: Mike Curb; Don Costa; Michael Lloyd; The Osmonds

Jimmy Osmond chronology
| Killer Joe (1972) | Little Arrows (1975) | Kimi Wa Pretty (1981) |

Singles from Little Arrows
- 1. "I'm Gonna Knock on Your Door" Released: 1974; 2. "Little Arrows" Released: 1974

Little Arrows is the third studio album released by Jimmy Osmond in 1975. Two singles, "Little Arrows" and "I'm Gonna Knock on Your Door", were released from the album.

== Track listing ==
| No. | Title | Writer(s) | Length |
|---|---|---|---|
| 1. | "Little Arrows" | Albert Hammond, Mike Hazlewood | 2:38 |
| 2. | "I'm Gonna Knock on Your Door" | Aaron Schroeder, Sid Wayne | 2:06 |
| 3. | "The Banana Boat Song (Day-O)" | | 2:30 |
| 4. | "Tic Tac Toe" | | 2:21 |
| 5. | "Keep Your Eye on the Girlie You Love" | | 2:21 |
| 6. | "The Good Old Bad Old Days" | | 3:00 |
| 7. | "Angry" | | 2:50 |
| 8. | "Purple People Eater" | | 2:42 |
| 9. | "Don't You Remember" | | 2:43 |
| 10. | "Good Ole Mammy Song" | | 2:58 |

== Personnel ==
- Don Costa, Thomas Oliver - arrangements
- Humberto Gatica, Ed Green - engineers
