= Killer Joe (Jimmy Osmond album) =

Studio album by Jimmy Osmond
- Released: December 2, 1972
- Genre: Pop
- Length: 22:14
- Label: MGM/Kolob
- Producer: Don Costa; "Long Haired Lover from Liverpool" by Mike Curb, Perry Botkin Jr.

Jimmy Osmond chronology
Little Jimmy Osmond (1972)	Killer Joe (1972)	Little Arrows (1975)

Killer Joe is the second album by "Little" Jimmy Osmond, released in 1972 on MGM Records.

The first single from this album, "Long Haired Lover from Liverpool", copyright Virgin Ear Music, reached #1 on the U.K. singles, making the then nine-year-old Osmond the youngest chart-topper in British charts history. It was produced by Mike Curb and Perry Botkin Jr.; unlike the rest of the album which was produced and arranged by Don Costa. Ed Caraeff was responsible for the front cover photography.

== Track listing ==
Side one

1. "Killer Joe" (Bert Berns, Bob Elgin, Phil Medley) – 2:40
2. "Little Girls are Fun" (Ron Myers) – 1:37
3. "My Girl" (Smokey Robinson, Ronald White) – 2:47
4. "Mama'd Know What to Do" (Bruno Zorelli) – 4:00
5. "Let Me Be Your Teddy Bear" (Kal Mann, Bernie Lowe) – 2:45

Side two

1. "Long Haired Lover from Liverpool" (Christopher Kingsley) – 2:14
2. "If My Dad Were President" (Bruno Zorelli) – 3:40
3. "Tweedlee Dee" (Winfield Scott) – 3:41
4. "Mother of Mine" (Bill Parkinson) – 3:21
5. "Rubber Ball" (Gene Pitney, Aaron Schroeder) – 2:14

== Charts ==
Chart (1973)	Peak position
Australia (Kent Music Report)	64
