= Olive Osmond =

Mother of Osmond singing family (1925–2004)

- Born: Olive May Davis; May 4, 1925; Samaria, Idaho, U.S.
- Died: May 9, 2004 (aged 79); Provo, Utah, U.S.
- Other name: Mother Osmond
- Spouse: George Osmond (m. 1944)
- Children: 9, including Tom, Alan, Wayne, Merrill, Jay, Donny, Marie, and Jimmy

Olive May Osmond (née Davis; May 4, 1925 – May 9, 2004) was the matriarch of the American Osmond singing family.

== Life and career ==
She was born in Malad City, Idaho, to Thomas Martin Davis, a university professor; and his wife Vera Ann (née Nichols). After high school, she moved to Ogden, Utah. She met George Osmond at Defense Depot Ogden where he was stationed, and she worked as a secretary. They married on December 1, 1944. Both were devout members of the Church of Jesus Christ of Latter-day Saints.

Their first two children, Virl and Tom, were born with a degenerative condition which left them nearly deaf. Doctors warned the couple that future children had a higher chance of having hearing loss, but George and Olive wanted a large family. The other children, Alan, Wayne, Merrill, Jay, Donny, Marie, and Jimmy, were born able to hear.

George formed a barbershop quartet consisting of Alan, Wayne, Merrill, and Jay, and eventually got them booked at Disneyland, where the boys caught the attention of Walt Disney himself, and Andy Williams's father. From 1962 to 1971, the Osmond Brothers appeared on The Andy Williams Show. Donny made his debut on the program the day after his sixth birthday.

The brothers eventually left Williams and were regulars on the second incarnation of The Jerry Lewis Show (1967-1969) before launching a successful recording career. The siblings - including Donny, Marie, and Jimmy as solo artists - scored several hits, The Osmonds' biggest being "One Bad Apple", which climbed to #1. From 1976 to 1979, Donny and Marie hosted The Donny and Marie Show.

Olive's role in the family was largely that of being the children's mother, ensuring the children were properly homeschooled through correspondence courses and that they were protected from predatory media coverage; she developed a strong working relationship with Ann Moses, the reporter from Tiger Beat assigned to the Osmond family beat. Other teen magazines were not always as fortunate: Olive was reportedly furious when 16 magazine photographer Gloria Staver had managed to photograph Donny shirtless. Olive was, as Moses recalled, a "business wizard" but largely left the business side of the family operation to her husband, George. In the early years of the Osmond Brothers, she also handled the vocal arrangements until Wayne, who was found to have perfect pitch, was old enough to take that responsibility. Though Tom Osmond was largely deaf, Olive developed a method to teach him how to play the piano.

Marie played Olive in 1982's Side by Side: The True Story of the Osmond Family. 2001's Inside the Osmonds (produced by Jimmy) depicted the siblings' egos and their frustration at not being taken seriously as artists by the music industry, George's fiscal mismanagement, and the quest to establish a "new Hollywood" in Utah as leading to the family's downfall.

In 2001, Osmond experienced a stroke. She faced complications from the condition for the rest of her life and died in Provo, on May 9, 2004. She was 79 years old.

== Children ==
George and Olive Osmond had nine children:

- (George) Virl Osmond Jr. (born October 19, 1945)
- Thomas Rulon "Tom" Osmond (born October 26, 1947)
- Alan Ralph Osmond (June 22, 1949 – April 20, 2026)
- (Melvin) Wayne Osmond (August 28, 1951 – January 1, 2025)
- Merrill Davis Osmond (born April 30, 1953)
- Jay Wesley Osmond (born March 2, 1955)
- Donald "Donny" Clark Osmond (born December 9, 1957)
- (Olive) Marie Osmond (born October 13, 1959)
- James Arthur "Jimmy" Osmond (born April 16, 1963)
