= The Travels of Jaimie McPheeters (TV series) =

American western television series

- Genre: Western
- Starring: Kurt Russell; Dan O'Herlihy; Charles Bronson; Donna Anderson; Michael Witney; Meg Wyllie
- Theme music composer: Leigh Harline; Jerry Winn
- Country of origin: United States
- Original language: English
- No. of seasons: 1
- No. of episodes: 26

Production
- Executive producer: Boris Sagal
- Producers: Don Ingalls; Boris Ingster; Robert Sparks; Robert E. Thompson
- Camera setup: Single-camera
- Running time: 48 minutes
- Production company: MGM Television

Original release
- Network: ABC
- Release: September 29, 1963 – March 15, 1964

Related
- Guns of Diablo (film)

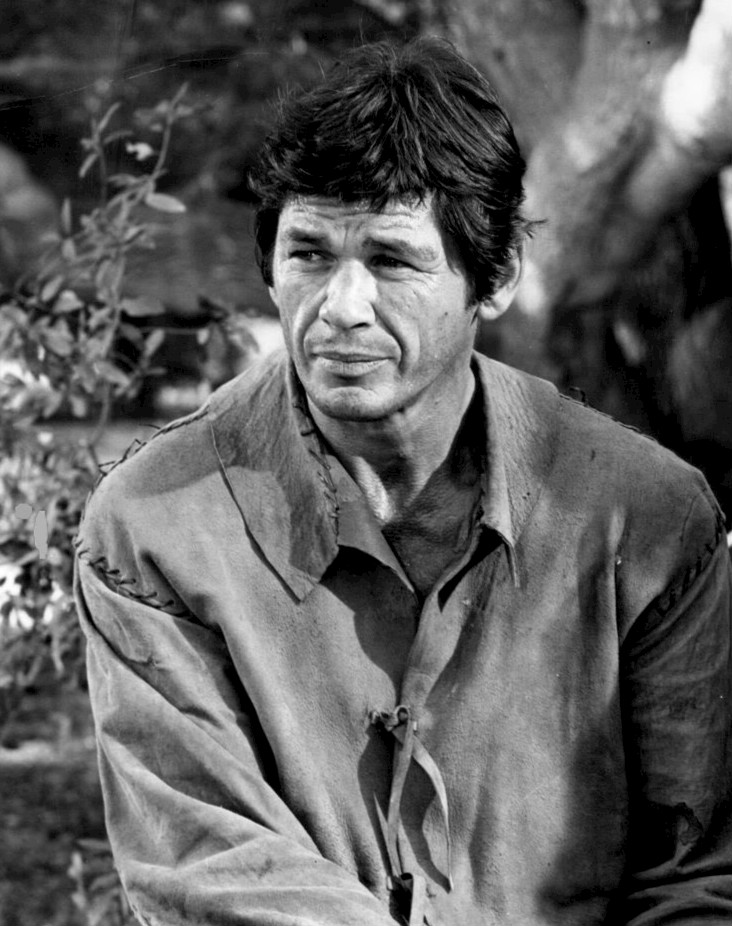
Charles Bronson as Linc Murdock

The Travels of Jaimie McPheeters is an American Western television series based on Robert Lewis Taylor's 1958 Pulitzer Prize-winning novel of the same name, and starring Kurt Russell, Dan O'Herlihy and (in the final 13 episodes) Charles Bronson. The series aired on ABC for one season, 1963–64, and was produced by MGM Television.

== Synopsis ==
The series was aimed at teenaged boys and young families. It was known for the breakthrough performances of the 12-year-old Kurt Russell in the title role and Charles Bronson as Linc Murdock, the second wagon master in the last 13 episodes. Bronson began his role in the episode "The Day of the Toll Takers" (January 5, 1964). Each episode begins with the title "The Day of ..."

Although it started out with an ensemble cast, by the end of the run, the cast had largely been reduced to the characters of Jaimie and Linc. The original cast included Dan O'Herlihy in the role of Jaimie's father, Sardius "Doc" McPheeters, who often yields to alcohol and gambling. Donna Anderson played Jenny, a young pioneer woman who befriends Jaimie during the perilous journey westward.

Mark Allen was cast in 19 episodes as Matt Kissel, with Meg Wyllie in 18 segments as Mrs. Kissel. In nine episodes, the real-life child barbershop quartet The Osmond Brothers, who would become a successful musical act in the 1970s, portrayed the singing sons of the Kissel family, all with given names of books of the Old Testament: Alan Osmond as Micah Kissel, Merrill Osmond as Deuteronomy Kissel, Jay Osmond as Lamentations Kissel, and Wayne Osmond as Leviticus Kissel.

Michael Witney in 14 episodes portrayed the first wagon master, Buck Coulter, with his last appearance in "The Day of the Pawnees, Part 2" (December 29, 1963). Witney was replaced by Bronson in the next episode. Hedley Mattingly was cast eight times as Coe, and James Westerfield appeared seven times as John Murrel. Other recurring roles were filled by Sandy Kenyon in five episodes as Shep Baggott, stuntman Paul Baxley four times as Tracey, and Mike DeAnda in five assorted roles. Vernett Allen, III, was cast as Othello in nine episodes.

Guthrie Thomas, the now-veteran singer-songwriter, was also included in the cast of character actors as a "double" for Kurt Russell when horses were involved. Thomas and Russell were only months apart in age and the TV producers did not want Russell harmed because of insurance liabilities. Thomas had been raised on several ranches, one of which was owned by film actor Francis Lederer, and fulfilled the age and horse-riding requirements of Russell's role as Jaimie McPheeters. Thomas was accustomed to the film business, as several motion pictures, one being John Ford's Sergeant Rutledge, had been filmed at Lederer's Mission Stables, now an historical California landmark. Veteran Western actor Slim Pickens, a close friend of Thomas' family, was responsible for his getting a screen test and subsequent roles.

== Episodes ==
No.	Title	Directed by	Written by	Original release date
1	"The Day of Leaving"	Boris Sagal	S : Robert Lewis Taylor; T : John Gay	September 15, 1963
2	"The Day of the First Trail"	Fred Jackman Jr.	S : Robert Lewis Taylor; T : John Gay	September 22, 1963
3	"The Day of the First Suitor"	Don Medford	S : Robert Lewis Taylor; T : Herman Groves	September 29, 1963
4	"The Day of the Golden Fleece"	Walter Doniger	T : Joseph Cavelli, Don Ingalls; S/T : Leon Paul	October 6, 1963
5	"The Day of the Last Bugle"	Allen H. Miner	T : Don Ingalls; S/T : Noel Langley	October 13, 1963
6	"The Day of the Skinners"	Fred Jackman Jr.	S : N.B. Stone Jr. S/T : Don Ingalls	October 20, 1963
7	"The Day of the Taboo Man"	Andrew V. McLaglen	T : Margaret Armen	October 27, 1963
8	"The Day of the Giants"	Unknown	T : Herman Groves	November 3, 1963
9	"The Day of the Long Night"	Abner Biberman	T : Joseph Cavelli	November 10, 1963
10	"The Day of the Killer"	Walter Doniger	T : Robert E. Thompson	November 17, 1963
11	"The Day of the Flying Dutchman"	Don Taylor	T : Jay Simms	December 1, 1963
12	"The Day of the Homeless"	Boris Sagal	T : Shimon Wincelberg	December 8, 1963
13	"The Day of the Misfits"	Jack Arnold	T : Shimon Wincelberg	December 15, 1963
14	"The Day of the Pawnees: Part 1"	Tom Gries	S : Louis Pelletier; T : Leon Paul	December 22, 1963
15	"The Day of the Pawnees: Part 2"	Fred Jackman Jr.	T : Don Ingalls	December 29, 1963
16	"The Day of the Toll Takers"	Walter Doniger	T : Ken Trevey	January 5, 1964
17	"The Day of the Wizard"	Boris Sagal	T : Shimon Wincelberg	January 12, 1964
18	"The Day of the Search"	James Goldstone	T : Robert E. Thompson	January 19, 1964
19	"The Day of the Haunted Trail"	Stuart Heisler	T : Ardel Wray	January 26, 1964
20	"The Day of the Tin Trumpet"	Ted Post	T : Edwin Blum	February 2, 1964
21	"The Day of the Lame Duck"	Boris Sagal	T : Shimon Wincelberg	February 9, 1964
22	"The Day of the Picnic"	Richard Donner	T : John Gay	February 16, 1964
23	"The Day of the 12 Candles"	Ted Post	T : Shirl Hendryx	February 23, 1964
24	"The Day of the Pretenders"	Charles F. Haas	T : Roland Wolpert	March 1, 1964
25	"The Day of the Dark Deeds"	Donald C. Klune	T : Edwin Blum	March 8, 1964
26	"The Day of the Reckoning"	Boris Sagal	T : Bernie Giler	March 15, 1964

== Guest stars ==
- Ed Ames
- Dehl Berti
- James Brown
- Barry Cahill
- Howard Caine
- Lloyd Corrigan
- Royal Dano
- Jena Engstrom
- Leif Erickson
- Carl Esmond
- Kathy Garver
- Mariette Hartley
- George Kennedy
- Martin Landau
- Ruta Lee
- David McCallum
- Burgess Meredith
- Barbara Nichols
- Warren Oates
- Susan Oliver
- Slim Pickens
- Roy Roberts
- Chris Robinson
- Albert Salmi
- Frank Silvera
- Lee Van Cleef
- Doodles Weaver
- Keenan Wynn

== Reception ==
The program faced stiff competition on CBS at 7:30 Eastern on Sundays from My Favorite Martian and the first half of The Ed Sullivan Show. NBC aired Walt Disney's Wonderful World of Color in the same time slot.

== Film ==
After the series was cancelled, Kurt Russell and Charles Bronson reprised their roles of Jaimie McPheeters and Linc Murdock in the 1964 theatrical movie called Guns of Diablo, an expanded color version of the series' final episode, "The Day of the Reckoning" (March 15, 1964). Russ Conway appeared in the film as "Doc" McPheeters, replacing Dan O'Herlihy in new sequences.
