= Osmund =

Osmund (Latin Osmundus) is a Germanic name composed of the word Os meaning "god" and mund meaning "protection."

Osmund or Osmond may refer to:

== Pre-modern era ==
Ordered chronologically

- Osmund of Sussex (fl. 760–772), a king of Sussex
- Osmund (bishop of London), (died c. 808)
- Osmond Drengot (c. 985–1018), Norman adventurer who fought with and against the Byzantines
- Osmund (missionary bishop) (fl. 11th century), first Swedish bishop
- Saint Osmund (died 1099), Norman count, bishop of Salisbury and Catholic and Anglican saint

== Modern era ==
Ordered alphabetically

- Osmond Ardagh (1900–1954), English cricketer
- Osmond Barnes (1834–1930), British colonel in the Indian Army
- Osmond Borradaile (1898–1999), Canadian cameraman and cinematographer
- Osmond Brock (1869–1947), British Royal Navy admiral of the fleet
- Osmund Bullock (born 1951), an English art historian and actor
- Osmund de Silva (1901–1980), Inspector-General of Sri Lanka Police from 1955 to 1959
- Sir Osmond Esmonde, 12th Baronet (1896–1936), Irish politician
- Osmond Ezinwa (born 1971), Nigerian sprinter
- Osmond Fisher (1817–1914), English geologist and geophysicist
- Osmond Ingram (1887–1917), United States Navy sailor and posthumous recipient of the Medal of Honor
- Osmond Kendall, developer in 1953 of the Composer-Tron for the Canadian Marconi Company
- Osmund Jayaratne (1924–2006), Sri Lankan politician and academic
- Sir Osmond Williams, 1st Baronet (1849–1927), Welsh politician
- Osmond Wright (fl. 1994–present), Jamaican-born and London-based singer, songwriter, and producer, stage name Mozez

== See also ==
- Åsmund (disambiguation)
- Osmond (disambiguation)
