= Tom Osmond =

American Mormon (born 1947)

- Born: Thomas Rulon Osmond; October 26, 1947 (age 78); Ogden, Utah, U.S.
- Known for: One of the first deaf missionaries of the Church of Jesus Christ of Latter-day Saints; Older brother to The Osmonds
- Spouses: Lyn Heslop (m. 1972; div. 1989) Carolyn Olsen (m. 1989)
- Children: 7
- Parents: George Osmond; Olive Davis

Thomas Rulon Osmond (born October 26, 1947) is a member of the Osmond family, though he rarely performs with his musical family.

== Life and career ==
=== Childhood ===
Osmond was born in Ogden, Utah, to Olive May (née Davis; 1925–2004) and George Virl Osmond (1917–2007). The second of nine children, he has one older brother, George Virl Osmond Jr., and seven younger siblings: Alan, Wayne, Merrill, Jay, Donny, Marie and Jimmy. All of his younger siblings have been professional musicians since childhood.

Tom and Virl were both born with severe hearing loss. While Virl can hear and feel a musical beat, Tom is almost completely deaf. Despite his lack of hearing, he developed a love for music by feeling the vibrations of a piano, and with the help of his mother Olive, eventually learned the piano and saxophone.

Their younger brothers originally conceived the musical group in part to support Tom and Virl in purchasing hearing aids. Tom and Virl eventually learned how to play several instruments and in later years made occasional appearances with their brothers and sister, most notably the Christmas specials during the 1970s and early 1980s, and in the group's last performance together, in 2022, before Wayne's death.

=== Personal life ===
Tom married Lyn Heslop on January 13, 1972. They had five children together, including one who died as an infant, before divorcing in 1989. Tom worked for the United States Postal Service for 28 years before retiring in 2014. He resides with his second wife Carolyn in Ephraim, Utah; they have two children together. Tom also has two stepchildren from Carolyn's previous relationship.

On July 7, 2018, Osmond underwent a quadruple bypass surgery, but had complications and was put on life support for several days before improving.

Both hearing-impaired Osmond brothers became the inspiration for the Children's Miracle Network. Tom has gained some hearing through medical treatment.

Tom and Virl were also the first deaf missionaries from the Church of Jesus Christ of Latter-day Saints.
