= Osment =

Osment is a surname of Anglo-Saxon English origin, a variant of Osmond. Notable people with the surname include:

- Darren Osment, English convicted murderer
- Emily Osment (born 1992), American actress and singer-songwriter
- Haley Joel Osment (born 1988), American actor
- Matthew Osment, New Zealand drummer
