= David Osmond =

American musician and television host

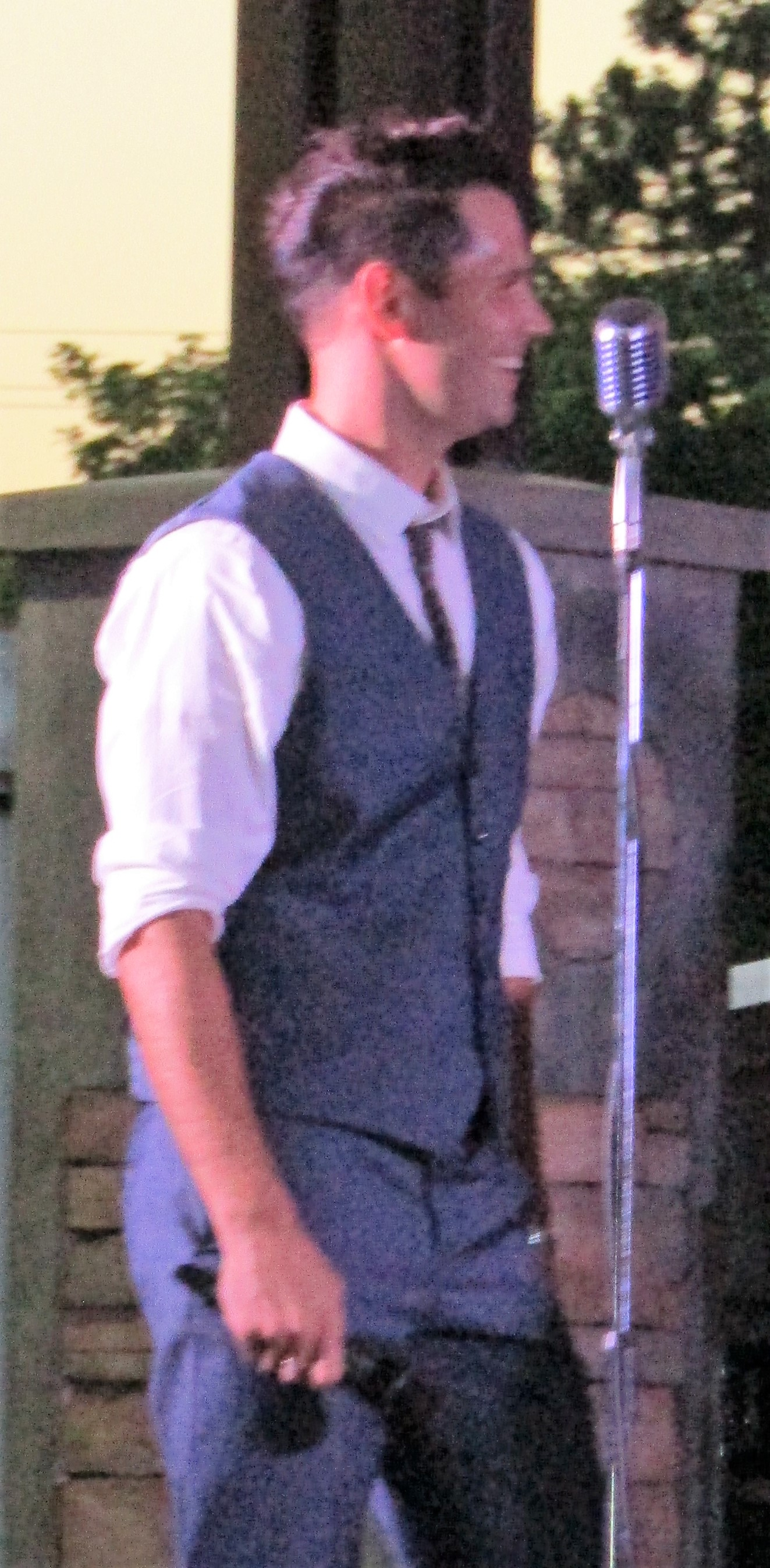
David Osmond in 2018.

David Levi Osmond (born 1979) is an American musician and television personality, a second-generation member of the Osmond family.

== Career ==
Osmond was born in 1979, the fourth of eight sons born to Alan Osmond and Suzanne Pinegar.

=== The Osmonds Second Generation ===
Recognizing and encouraging their musical talents, Alan trained David and his older brothers Michael, Nathan and Doug as a child barbershop quartet, using the Osmond Brothers' early repertoire. In 1986, they publicly debuted as the Osmond Boys, with six-year-old David as lead vocalist. The quartet eventually expanded into an octet as the younger brothers grew up, later performing as the Osmonds Second Generation. By the early 1990s, the Osmonds Second Generation, although they never charted a hit record, had achieved substantial success as a touring act, appearing as the openers for the New Kids on the Block. They signed to Curb Records, in part because Mike Curb sought revenge on the Osmonds after Donny signed with another label for his 1989 comeback and made attempts to pit the family members against each other. They settled in Branson, Missouri in the early 1990s and took up a residency at their uncle Jimmy Osmond's theater, and another record deal had the group sign with Epic Records.

The Osmonds Second Generation initially split up in the late 1990s as they served church missions; Alan Osmond had initially warned his children against following him into the entertainment business in adulthood because of the touring commitments and the detrimental effect it would have on their family lives. In addition to David and Nathan (who performs as a country singer) pursuing solo careers, the eight brothers have occasionally reunited to sing together, usually for tributes to Alan. Near the end of his life, Alan expressed pride in his children continuing the Osmond family musical tradition.

=== Solo career and multiple sclerosis diagnosis ===
In 1997, Osmond assumed the title role in the touring production of Joseph and the Amazing Technicolor Dreamcoat, a role previously played by his uncle, Donny Osmond.

Osmond moved to Los Angeles following his run in Joseph and continued to tour and perform through the end of 2005, when he began experiencing pain in his extremities that rapidly escalated to paralysis, to the point where he was bound to a wheelchair and could no longer play his usual instrument, the guitar. This eventually led to a diagnosis of relapse-remit multiple sclerosis. Steroid treatments eventually allowed him to regain his function, and monthly injections of B cell suppressants ocrelizumab and ofatumumab have largely prevented long-term progression that largely ended the performing career of his father Alan. He also credited a clean diet and an optimistic attitude instilled from his father's experience with the disease for allowing him to continue performing despite lingering pain from the condition.

Seeking to make a comeback, he auditioned for the eighth season of American Idol; though the Osmonds 2nd Generation had signed record deals during the peak of their early careers, he had never done so as a solo act, which meant he still qualified. He advanced to the Hollywood round on the episode aired January 28, 2009. However, due to laryngitis, he was not able to make it past Hollywood week. His song "We Are One" was used as the theme song to the Glenn Beck Radio Program from 2016 to 2017.

Osmond also co-leads the Osmond Chapman Orchestra, a big band. He has occasionally appeared with the members of the Osmond family who are still performing, including a 2019 appearance with his aunt Marie and uncles Merrill and Jay, billed as Marie and the Osmonds.

=== Television ===
Osmond hosts a revival of Wonderama that has been in periodic production since 2017. Since 2021, David Osmond has been a host of KUTV's lifestyle/infotainment program Fresh Living.

== Personal life ==
Osmond is married to the former Valerie McClain and has three children, two girls and a boy. Like the rest of the Osmond family, he, his wife and children are members of the Church of Jesus Christ of Latter-day Saints.
