= KQEO =

Coordinates: 43.352°N 112.009°W

- Idaho Falls, Idaho; United States
- Broadcast area: Idaho Falls, Idaho
- Frequency: 107.1 MHz (HD Radio)
- Branding: Arrow 107.1

Programming
- Format: Classic hits
- Subchannels: HD2: KUPI Legends (Classic country); HD3: La Super Caliente (Regional Mexican); HD4: Radio by Grace (Contemporary Christian)

Ownership
- Owner: Sandhill Radio

History
- First air date: 2003

Technical information
- Licensing authority: FCC
- Facility ID: 87926
- Class: C1
- ERP: 100,000 watts
- HAAT: 193 meters
- Translators: HD2: 92.5 K223BU (Idaho Falls); HD3: 100.1 K261DB (Rigby); HD3: 103.7 K279AU (Idaho Falls); HD4: 95.7 K239BN (Idaho Falls)
- Repeater: 107.1 KQEO-FM1 (Pocatello)

Links
- Public license information: Public file; LMS
- Webcast: Listen live HD2: Listen live HD3: Listen live
- Website: arrow1071.com kupilegends.com (HD2) lasupercaliente.com (HD3) radiobygrace.com (HD4)

KQEO (107.1 FM) is a commercial radio station located in Idaho Falls, Idaho. KQEO airs a classic hits music format branded as "Arrow 107.1". Disc Jockeys are Big Stu, Jay and Karina Osmond, John Balginy, and Marvelous Marv. In late 2013, the station began evolving from a classic rock station to a classic hits presentation under PD Paul Walker.

In 2014, Big Stu became the Program Director (a.k.a. Rick Stewart a.k.a. Rick Sutherlin). Rick is also the Brand Manager for 99 KUPI & 100.7 My-FM.
