= Osmond Studios =

Utah recording facility

- Industry: Television and Audio Production
- Founded: 1977; 49 years ago
- Fate: Sold
- Headquarters: Orem, Utah, United States

Osmond Studios (known as the Osmond Entertainment Center) was a television and audio recording production studio built in Orem, Utah by The Osmonds in 1977. It housed the Osmond's production company, Osmond Productions. The studio was where many of the Donny & Marie television series and The Osmond Family Show, were produced.

The studio was located at 777 N Palisades Drive in Orem, Utah. The 91,000-square foot complex offered a 17,800 two-story office area and two major production studios with a combined 21,300 square feet of space. A mobile ice-skating rink was incorporated for presenting a weekly ice-skating number. The main production floor had sectional seating for 280 audience members. Facilities of the studios included a 5,000 square foot rehearsal hall connected to a state-of-the-art 24-track recording studio, which was able to accommodate a full-size symphony orchestra. There were nine dressing rooms, makeup room, wardrobe and fitting room, audio and video control booths, still-photo studio and photo lab, lighting department and set design shops, scenery storage areas, electrical shops, reception area and lounges. Principal architect for the project was J. Shirl Cornwall of Cornwall Associates, Pasadena.

The first major production at the studio was the Donny & Marie variety TV series, which relocated from Los Angeles to the new Osmond facility in 1977 for what would be its final season. In 1981, the "Osmond Family Christmas Festival" was held at the studios as an event for families during Christmas featuring ice skating, drinking hot chocolate or cider, and visiting with Santa Claus. The in-studio ice-skating rink was moved to the parking lot for the occasion. Other variety shows produced by the Osmonds were filmed at the studio, including "The Donna Fargo Show" and "Mel and Susan Together" (Mel Tillis and Susan Anton), both 1978. It was also the locale of Marie Osmond's solo variety series, "Marie," which lasted for seven episodes in 1980 to 1981.

The Osmonds sold the studio in 1989 to Ventura Entertainment Group when it was no longer feasible to continue operating it.

James "Jimmy" Osmond later purchased the studio buildings back and refurbished them. For a while it housed the main offices of the Osmond Real Estate company until 1993, when it moved to a different location. Currently, the building is being used by Cirque Lodge as a private alcohol and drug abuse rehab center.
