= George Osmond =

American missionary (1917–2007)

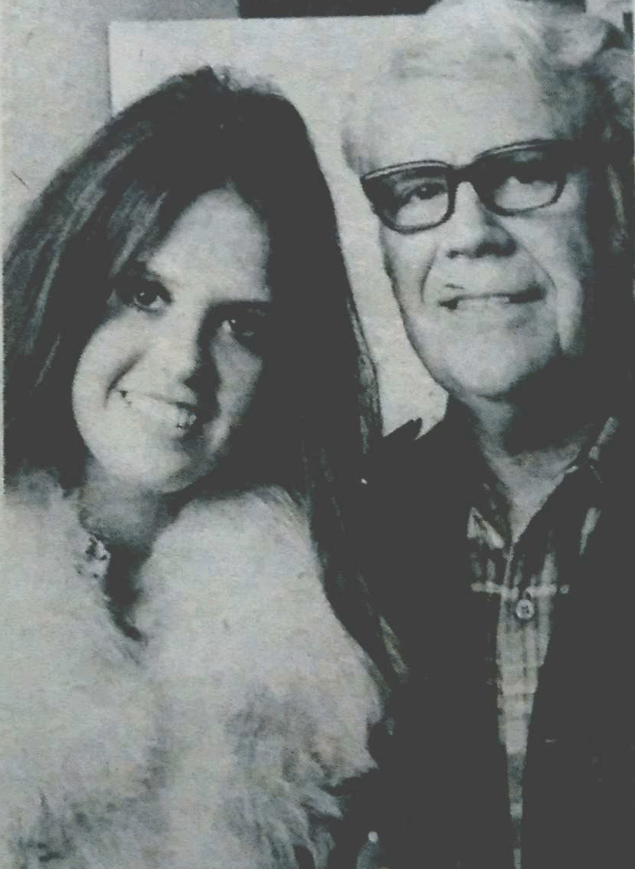
- Osmond with daughter, Marie Osmond, in 1974
- Born: George Virl Osmond; October 13, 1917; Etna, Wyoming, U.S.
- Died: November 6, 2007 (aged 90); Provo, Utah, U.S.
- Other name: Father Osmond
- Spouse: Olive May Davis (m. 1944; died 2004)
- Children: 9, including Tom, Alan, Wayne, Merrill, Jay, Donny, Marie, and Jimmy

George Virl Osmond Sr. (October 13, 1917 – November 6, 2007) was the patriarch of the singing Osmond family.

== Life and career ==
He was born in Etna, Wyoming, the youngest of Agnes (née Van Noy) and Rulon Osmond's three sons. Rulon's father, George, emigrated from England and became an early leader in The Church of Jesus Christ of Latter-day Saints. Rulon died on November 24, 1917, 42 days after George was born. Agnes married and later divorced John Neyman, with whom she had a daughter. She then married Clarence Hoopes, a widower with five children, and remained with him until his death; they had no children. Agnes survived long enough to see the rise and fall of George's children's musical careers.

A devout Latter-day Saint, Osmond served two LDS Church missions (Hawaii; the United Kingdom) after his discharge from the United States Army.

Stationed at Defense Depot Ogden in 1944, he met Olive Davis who worked there as a secretary; they married that December 1. The couple had nine children: George Jr. (Virl), Tom, Alan, Wayne, Merrill, Jay, Donny, Marie, and Jimmy. Virl and Tom were born with a degenerative condition which left them nearly deaf. Doctors warned the couple that future children had a higher chance of having a hearing loss, but George and Olive wanted a large family. While all of their other children were born hearing, Wayne Osmond eventually experienced severe hearing loss in the late 1990s as a result of treatment he received following removal of a brain tumor.

Osmond worked in real estate, insurance, and as postmaster for Ogden, as well as operating a homestead dairy farm with his brothers Rulon Jr. and Ralph. He loved to sing and taught his sons barbershop harmony, eventually forming Alan, Wayne, Merrill, and Jay into a quartet. The boys' natural talent soon received public notice, which led to frequent appearances at church functions and local civil events. An audition for The Lawrence Welk Show went awry after Welk snubbed the quartet, but an encounter with the Lennon Sisters led to a booking at Disneyland, where they caught the eye of Walt Disney himself, who took a personal interest in them. The boys then auditioned for Andy Williams, whose show helped launch them into the national spotlight.

As his sons' fortunes rose, Osmond devoted himself full-time to managing them. He moved the family to California to place them closer to the heart of the entertainment industry, returning the family to Utah after they had broken through to mainstream fame. Osmond continued to micromanage his sons' careers well into their adulthood. When their careers began to wane in the late 1970s, he entered into business partnerships that eventually put the family into substantial debt. The patriarch refused to let the family declare bankruptcy, ordering his children to go on tour until the family's debts were paid off.

Jay Osmond described his father as strict, but not abusive, in that he held the Osmond Brothers to a high standard knowing that such professionalism was necessary for them to succeed. Merrill expressed similar sentiments in 2008, noting that life was reminiscent of the United States Marine Corps and that he would not recommend it, but that his father was more loving than, for example, Jackson 5 patriarch Joe Jackson.

Donny struggled the most with his father's approach to parenting (Donny recalled an incident where George spanked him when, at age 8, he attempted to write to his mother to take him off the tour and send him home); by the early 1980s, he became less able to hide his frustration with what had been foisted upon him in his childhood. The Osmond family was out of debt by 1983.

In 2004, Olive died shortly before her and George's 60th wedding anniversary. On November 6, 2007, Osmond died at his home in Provo, Utah, of natural causes. Affectionately known to the family's fans as "Father Osmond", he is buried at the East Lawn Memorial Hills Cemetery in Provo beside Olive. Along with his nine children, George Osmond was survived by 56 grandchildren (among them politician Aaron Osmond and television host David Osmond) and many great-grandchildren.

== Children ==
Osmond had nine children with his wife Olive:

- George Virl Osmond Jr. (born October 19, 1945)
- Thomas Rulon Osmond (born October 26, 1947)
- Alan Ralph Osmond (June 22, 1949 – April 20, 2026)
- Melvin Wayne Osmond (August 28, 1951 – January 1, 2025)
- Merrill Davis Osmond (born April 30, 1953)
- Jay Wesley Osmond (born March 2, 1955)
- Donald Clark "Donny" Osmond (born December 9, 1957)
- Olive Marie Osmond (born October 13, 1959, her father's 42nd birthday)
- James Arthur Osmond (born April 16, 1963)
