= The Osmonds =

American family pop band (1959–2019)

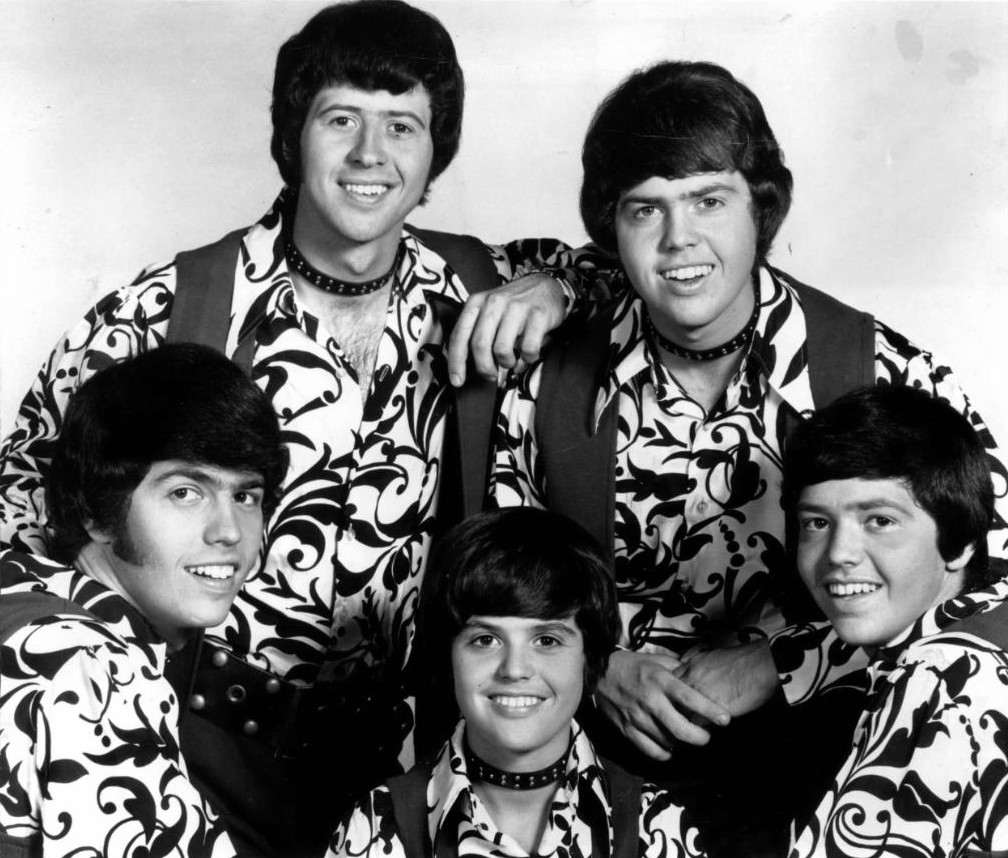
- The Osmonds in 1971 (Clockwise from lower left: Alan, Wayne, Merrill, Jay, Donny)

Background information
- Also known as: The Osmond Brothers
- Origin: Ogden, Utah, U.S.
- Genres: Bubblegum; pop rock; country
- Years active: 1959–2019
- Labels: MGM; Barnaby; Kolob; Polydor; Mercury; Elektra; Curb; Warner Bros.
- Past members: Alan Osmond; Merrill Osmond; Jay Osmond; Wayne Osmond; Donny Osmond; Jimmy Osmond

The Osmonds were an American pop band composed of members of the Osmond family. The group had its best-known configurations as a quartet (billed the Osmond Brothers) and a quintet (the Osmonds). The group consisted of siblings, all members of a family of musicians from Ogden, Utah.

The Osmond Brothers began as a barbershop quartet consisting of brothers Alan, Wayne, Merrill and Jay. They were later joined by younger siblings Donny and Jimmy, both of whom enjoyed success as solo artists. With the addition of Donny, the group became known as the Osmonds; performing both as teen idols and as a rock band. Their only sister Marie, who rarely sang with her brothers at that time, launched a successful career in 1973, both as a solo artist and as Donny's duet partner. By 1976, the band was no longer producing hit singles; that year, they transitioned into television with Donny & Marie, a popular variety show that ran until 1979.

A revival of the original Osmond Brothers lineup in the 1980s achieved moderate success in country music, and both Donny and Marie separately made comebacks in their respective fields in the late 1980s. The Osmonds have sold over 77 million records worldwide.

The quartet continued to perform through their 50th anniversary in 2007, at which point Alan and, later, Wayne retired due to health issues; Jimmy was recruited after Alan's retirement, with the group performing as a trio until Jimmy suffered a stroke and retired in 2018. On 14 October 2019, the original Osmond Brothers quartet reunited for CBS' The Talk for their sister Marie's 60th birthday, which would be the last appearance for the lineup before Wayne's death in 2025. The brothers performed "The Last Chapter", written as a farewell song and introduced in 2018. Merrill and Jay professionally split from each other and began performing separately in late 2019; both now perform on reduced schedules, while Donny continues a full performance schedule.

== History ==
=== 1959–1970: Early years ===
George Virl Osmond Sr. and Olive Osmond, members of the Church of Jesus Christ of Latter-day Saints, resided on a farm in Ogden, Utah, with their family. George was a postal worker with a military background; both he and Olive were musicians within their church. They had nine children: Virl (George Virl Jr.), Tom, Alan, Wayne, Merrill, Jay, Donny, Marie, and Jimmy. Virl and Tom were both born with severe hearing impairments. After Virl and Tom's births, doctors had warned the couple that further children would likely also have hearing impairment, but "sensing a divine message" not to stop having children, they continued having children anyway; all seven of the later children would be born with full hearing.

The eldest of the Osmond brothers who were members of the band, Alan was recognized as leader of The Osmonds, with his brothers referring to him as "No. 1."

The Osmond Brothers' career began in 1959 when Alan, Wayne, Merrill, and Jay began singing barbershop music for local audiences in and around Ogden, as well as during their weekly church services. In their made-for-TV movie Inside the Osmonds, they explain that they originally performed to earn money to help buy hearing aids for Virl and Tom and to finance their future church missions. In February 1959, Val Hicks began coaching the Osmonds brothers to sing barbershop harmony after their mother heard one of his quartets performing at a church fundraising event. Despite their young ages (ranging from nine to three years old), within a few years the boys' talent and stage presence were strong enough that their father took them to compete in an amateur barbershop singing competition in California. On the same trip they visited Disneyland, where Tommy Walker, Disneyland's Director of Entertainment and Customer Relations from 1955 to 1966, found the Osmond Brothers singing with the Dapper Dans on Main Street. Walker hired the Osmonds to perform in the park during the following summer and to perform minor roles in the television series The Travels of Jaimie McPheeters, starring actor Kurt Russell. The family also appeared on a segment of Disneyland After Dark, which first aired in April 1962. The group also visited The Lennon Sisters, hoping to get their feedback given their reputation as a family harmony group; this led to a long-running friendship between the two families and (some time after a missed connection had prevented the Osmonds from auditioning for Lawrence Welk) the occasional guest appearance on The Lawrence Welk Show in the mid-1960s.

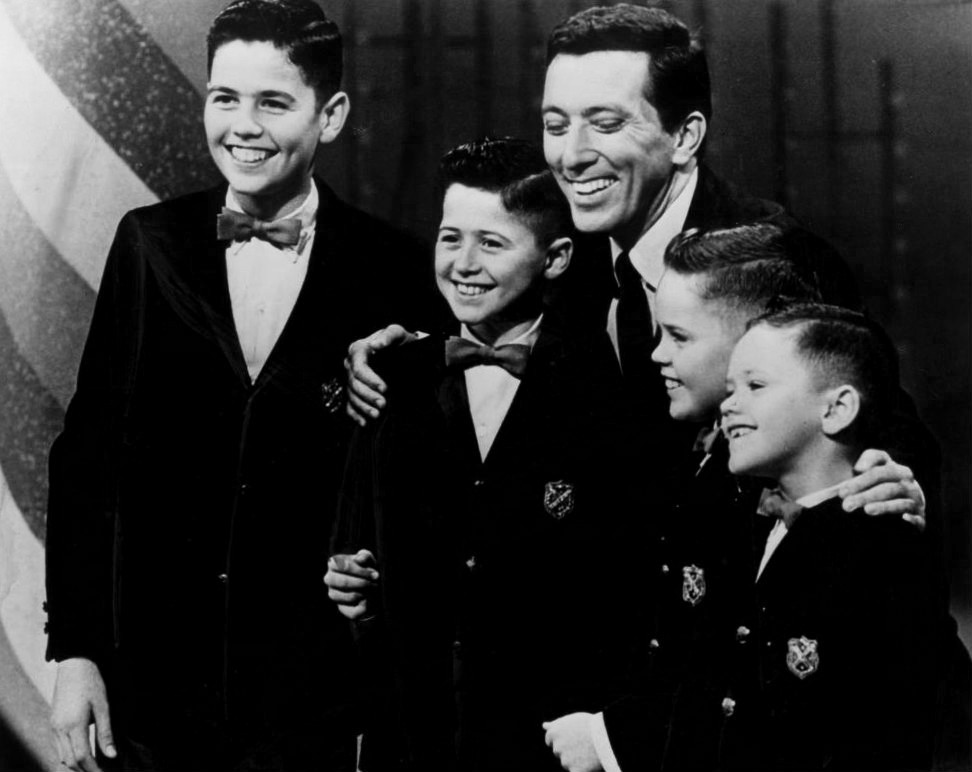
The boys with Andy Williams in 1964. From left: Alan, Wayne, Williams, Merrill, and Jay.

While the Osmond Brothers were working on Disneyland After Dark, Andy Williams's father Jay saw them and was so impressed he told his son to book them on his television show, The Andy Williams Show. Andy did, and the Osmond Brothers became regulars on the show from 1962 to 1967, where they earned the nickname "one-take Osmonds" among staff due to their professionalism and tireless rehearsing. Donny soon joined them on the show, making the Osmond Brothers a five-member group. Marie and Jimmy were also introduced on the show a few years later. During this time the Osmonds also toured Europe, performing with Sweden's most popular singer, Lars Lönndahl, and even releasing a single where they sang a Swedish version of "Two Dirty Little Hands" ("Fem smutsiga små fingrar").

The Andy Williams Show ended its first run in 1967, after which the Osmond Brothers were signed to The Jerry Lewis Show, staying with that show until it was canceled in 1969, after which they rejoined The Andy Williams Show, which had just returned for its second run. They soon decided they wanted to perform popular music and become a rock and roll band, prompting them to shed their variety-show image. This change was difficult for their father, who was suspicious of rock and roll, but he was persuaded and the boys began performing as a pop band. George Osmond used his military training to keep his sons strictly regimented.

In 1967, the Osmonds had the single "Flower Music" b/w "I Can't Stop" released by UNI Records. The song failed to become a hit. In 1968, the group signed with Barnaby Records which was founded by Andy Williams. They released multiple singles including "Candy Dew". The group saw several other singles released over the next four years, failing to score a hit until the 1971 chart debut of "One Bad Apple".

=== 1970–1972: Bubblegum, Osmonds and Homemade ===
Record producer Mike Curb saw the Osmonds perform as a band and recognized that they combined a rare mix of polished performing style, instrumental skill, and vocal talent. Curb, at the time, was in the midst of a crusade against rock musicians who promoted drug use, and the Osmond Brothers represented a wholesome and drug-free alternative to the psychedelic rock of the late 1960s. He signed the Osmonds to MGM Records and arranged for them to record at Muscle Shoals with R&B producer Rick Hall. Under Hall's guidance, the Osmonds hit the top spot on the pop chart with "One Bad Apple" in 1971. The song, "One Bad Apple", written by George Jackson, was composed in the style of the Jackson 5 (Jackson denied that he had ever offered it to the Jackson 5, though the Osmonds would later state that the Jackson 5 considered recording it). The Osmond and Jackson families would eventually meet in 1972 and become friends, with Donny and Michael Jackson becoming particularly close and Donny being deeply affected when Michael died in 2009. "One Bad Apple" debuted on the Billboard Hot 100 on 2 January 1971, first hitting No. 1 in February, where it stayed for five weeks.

The Osmonds soon had hits with other light, R&B-style pop numbers like "Double Lovin'" (No. 14, which was essentially a "One Bad Apple" sound-alike record) and "Yo-Yo" (No. 3). In each of these hits, the formula was the same; Merrill sang lead, and Donny was "co-lead" in essence, singing the "hook" or "chorus" of the song. At this time the Osmonds also recorded several songs that were billed to Donny, the lead soloist on the songs: "Sweet and Innocent" (No. 7), "Go Away Little Girl" (No. 1), "Hey Girl" (No. 9) and "Puppy Love" (No. 3). Uni Records also re-released their 1967 single "Flower Music", this time with "I Can't Stop" as the A-side, where it reached No. 96. Their transition to pop stars required more elaborate choreography than their original work had required, so older brother Virl Osmond—whose limited hearing was enough to follow a musical beat—taught the quintet how to dance. Olive Osmond initially taught the quintet how to sing harmony; the harmony arrangements eventually fell upon Wayne, who was found to have perfect pitch.

=== Transition to rock: Phase III and Crazy Horses ===
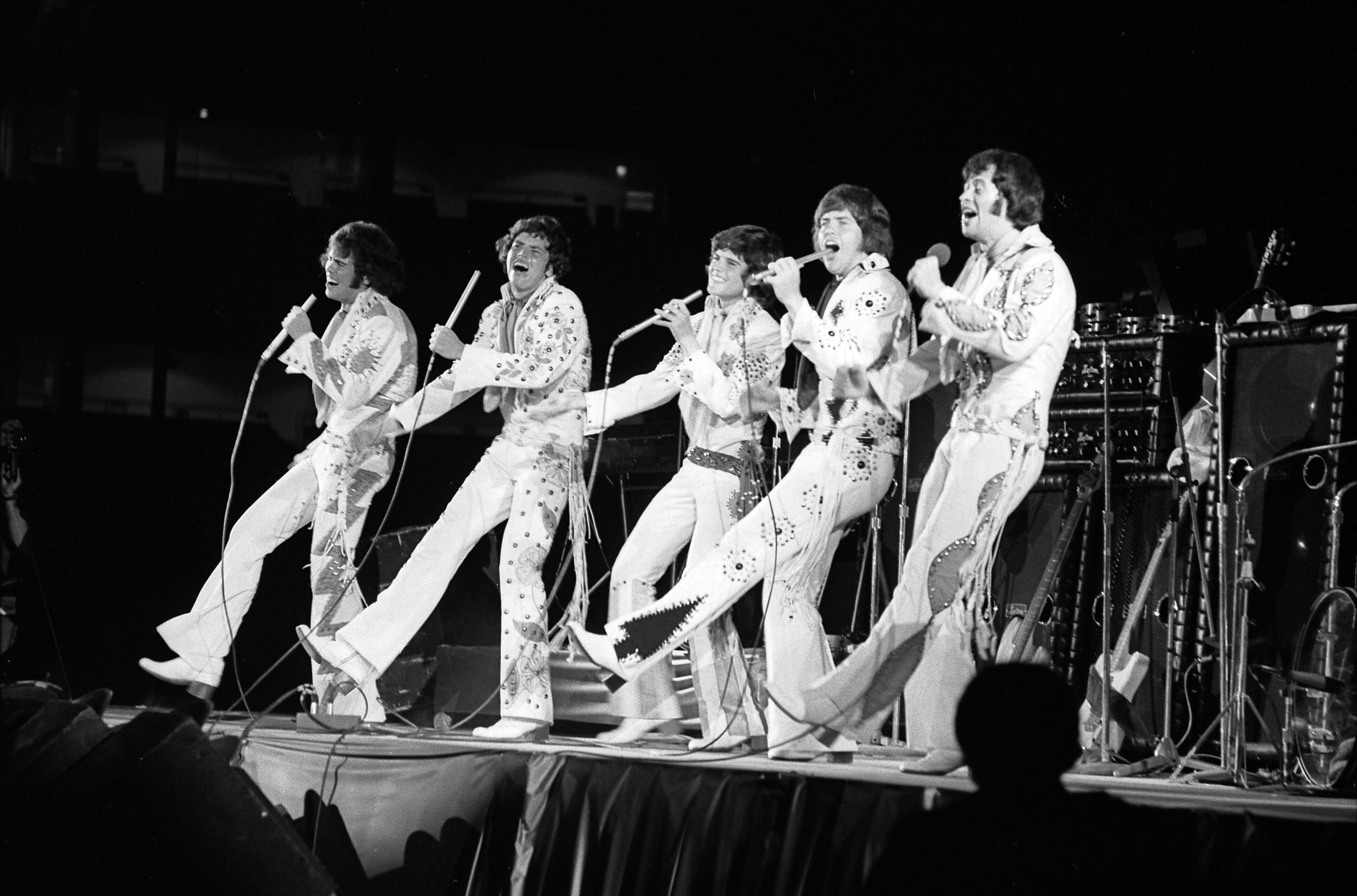
The Osmonds in their famed jumpsuits, performing in 1972.

The Osmonds began writing and performing their own music, and their sound moved towards rock music beginning with their album Phase III. Part of the transition to self-written music was, according to Wayne in 2004, the fact that the family was becoming dissatisfied with some of the material being offered to them not fitting their moral standards, so they started writing their own. Wayne was a major influence on the family's decision to move into rock, which was a source of tension as some of the brothers would rather have remained a pop band. In addition to "Yo-Yo", Phase III produced the major hit "Down by the Lazy River" (No. 4). Their next Crazy Horses album was the band's first personal statement – the brothers have been quoted as saying that the title song refers to air pollution from cars, and its instrumentation featured an even harder rock sound bordering on early heavy metal. They wrote all the songs and played all the instruments with Alan on rhythm guitar, Wayne on lead guitar, Merrill on lead vocals and bass, Jay on drums, and Donny on keyboards; all of the brothers sang backing vocals and an occasional lead on album cuts. The quintet also received a wardrobe makeover; upon the recommendation of Elvis Presley, they donned similar sequined jumpsuits designed by Bill Belew, which became their trademark look until the outfits were stolen from a van while the group was touring in Tennessee. (Merrill recalled in 2025 that the suits were instead designed by Bob Mackie.) There are no extant pictures of Presley with the Osmonds, because Colonel Tom Parker prohibited any from being taken. Donny largely switched to instrumental contributions for much of 1972 to accommodate his changing voice; by 1973, Donny had settled from his former boy soprano range into a smooth baritenor voice.

Donny's voice change was a major upset to the group's original formula for success, largely eliminating Merrill's young-sounding co-lead's voice and forcing Merrill's mature tenor voice to strain to cover most of the higher notes, with audible difficulty, through the next few years. The success of Crazy Horses singles "Hold Her Tight" (No. 14) and title track "Crazy Horses" (on which Donny did not sing, but did contribute with a prominent keyboard riff) kept the group very popular through 1973. As the group toured, Donny continued to sing his solo hits, with the band progressively lowering the key until his voice change was complete.

With their clean-cut image, talent, and energetic pop-rock sound, the Osmonds toured to crowds of fans across the United States. By this time, the Osmonds had broken through in the United Kingdom as well: counting group and solo recordings, members of the Osmond family charted 13 singles on the UK charts in 1973. Some observers coined a new word, "Osmondmania", to describe the phenomenon, by analogy with the similar "Beatlemania" of the previous decade. The group also had their own Saturday-morning cartoon series in 1972 and 1973, The Osmonds, on ABC-TV. Initially this audience was mostly girls who viewed the band as teen idols, but "Crazy Horses" would eventually introduce the band's stylings to a male audience.

=== Emergence as teen balladeers: The Plan and Love Me for a Reason ===
In their late teens, the older Osmond brothers were of age to go on church missions, typically expected for male members of the church. Noting that the Osmonds' music career was a major publicity boon for the church that had brought tens of thousands of new members, high-ranking church leadership exempted the Osmonds from missionary service on the logic that the group served as de facto missionaries for the faith through their fame and music. Merrill would eventually serve a mission in 2022 after the group disbanded.

They recorded an ambitious album in 1973 called The Plan, perhaps best described as a Mormon concept album with progressive rock aspirations, with Alan describing it as aiming to reach The Beatles' "white album" in scope. One reviewer for Billboard suggested that The Plan carried a too-strong religious message, given that Mormonism is perceived as fairly conservative and not usually associated with the themes of rock-and-roll. The reviewer likewise suggested that the music was too varied and too experimental. In a retrospective review, Allmusic stated The Plan showed the Osmonds had "versatility and skills as musical craftsmen" but they attempted too many musical styles to make the album cohesive as a whole and some of the lyrics were "preachy". The album produced only two minor hits: "Let Me In" and "Goin' Home" (both No. 36 in the United States, although they both went top 5 in the United Kingdom and "Let Me In" was also a major hit on the easy listening charts). Alan considers The Plan to be the group's magnum opus.

Following the release of The Plan, the popularity of the Osmonds as a group began to decline. Alan, Wayne, and Merrill all married their wives in 1973 and 1974 (Donny married in 1978; Jay would not marry until 1987), and the band began to slow their tour circuit. The Plan was also a major departure from the pop music which made them so popular. The combination of this album, along with Donny's voice change the year before, meant that the Osmonds' popularity with young fans would wane.

Another major factor in the band's decline was the sheer diversity of its output: within three years, the Osmonds released bubblegum pop, hard rock, and easy listening, and Donny's solo career as an oldies cover artist further muddled the band's direction. Donny's collaboration with Steve and Eydie, "We Can Make it Together" (which Alan, Wayne, and Merrill had penned for Donny), came out on the easy listening charts at the same time the much harder "Crazy Horses" song was charting.

=== Donny's solo career, and the emergence of Marie and Jimmy as spin-off acts ===
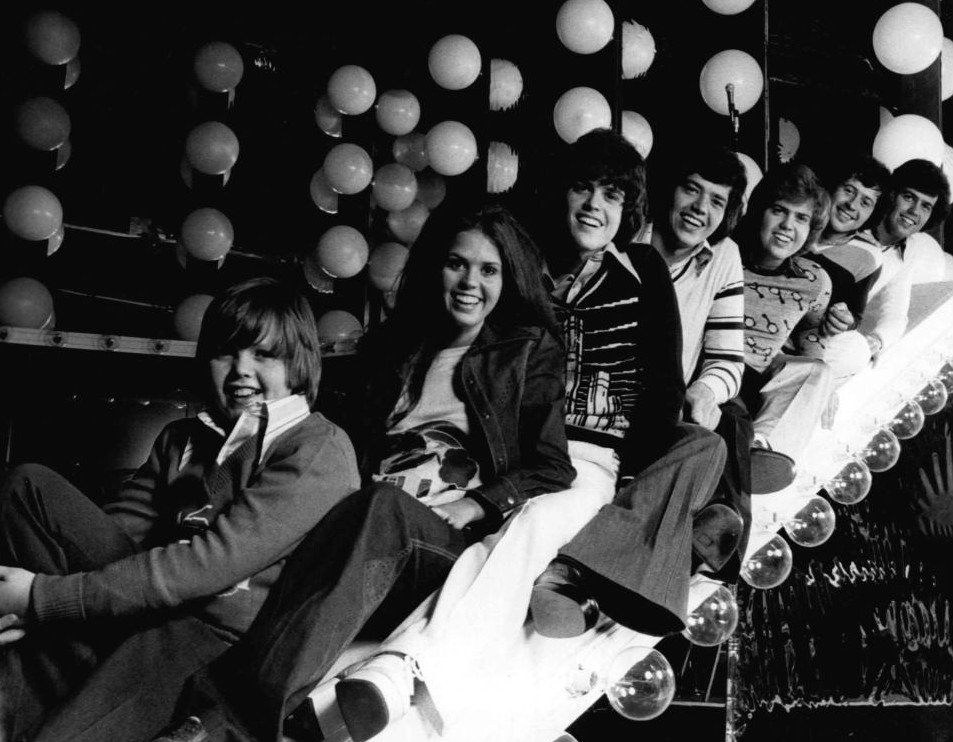
The siblings in 1974 (l/r): Jimmy, Marie, Donny, Jay, Merrill, Wayne, Alan

Donny, Marie, and Jimmy soon began to emerge as solo artists. Jimmy was becoming "big in Japan" and, in 1972, had a No. 1 hit in the United Kingdom with "Long Haired Lover from Liverpool". Marie, then 13 years old, hit No. 1 on the US country chart in 1973 with "Paper Roses" (a song originally recorded by Anita Bryant a decade before). Donny had a string of pop hits with covers of earlier teen-pop songs, including "Go Away Little Girl" (No. 1, originally by Steve Lawrence), "Puppy Love" (No. 3, a Paul Anka composition) and "The Twelfth of Never" (No. 8, originally recorded by Johnny Mathis). Between 1971 and 1976, Donny had twelve Top 40 hits, including five in the Top 10; for most of these, the Osmonds were still performing as a full band, but backing and giving star billing to Donny while he sang lead.

Donny's numerous solo hits have led many to assume he was the group's lead singer. Merrill was usually the lead singer; Donny would usually sing the choruses on songs billed to the Osmonds, thus being a "co-lead". (All five members of the group sang lead at various times; Jay would sing lead on some of the group's harder rock tunes, while Alan and Wayne would occasionally contribute a lead vocal on some album tracks.) Donny's emergence as a solo star and the record company's desire to appeal to the teen-girl audience often thrust Donny out in front of the group; the work of Tiger Beat editor Ann Moses was particularly influential in promoting Donny as a teen idol.

By now the family was touring, recording, creating, and producing for five technically separate artists: The Osmonds, Donny Osmond, Marie Osmond, and Jimmy Osmond – plus Donny and Marie had begun recording duets and had hits with "I'm Leaving It Up to You" (No. 4) and "Morning Side of the Mountain" (No. 8). Through all the stress and pressures created by these many efforts, the family hung together, largely at George's command. The 2001 ABC-TV movie Inside the Osmonds depicts the family mottoes as being "It doesn't matter who's out front, as long as it's an Osmond" and "family, faith, and career. In that order". (Alan and Jay recalled a slightly different variant: "God, then family, and then career, in that order.")

The original Osmonds as a group still produced hits. In 1974, "Love Me for a Reason" reached No. 10 in the United States and No. 1 in the United Kingdom. The Irish boy band Boyzone took the song to No. 2 in the UK in 1994. "Love Me for a Reason" was the title track to the album of the same name, which featured a blue-eyed soul format (their fourth style change in less than a decade) arranged by H. B. Barnum.

=== Fall from pop prominence: The Proud One and Brainstorm ===
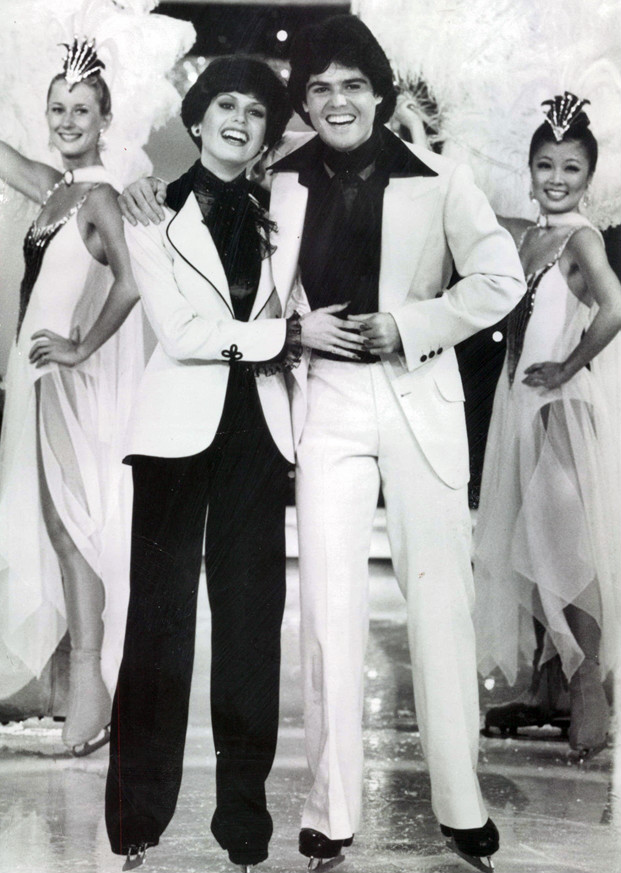
Donny and Marie, 1977

By 1976, though, the group's record sales were softening. Their 1975 album The Proud One sold poorly (despite the title track, a cover of a Frankie Valli minor hit, providing a chart-topping easy listening hit and the group's last US top-40 hit to date), and MGM Records was sold to PolyGram. Their first album on the subsidiary label Polydor was the album Brainstorm; that album sold only slightly better than its predecessor, and its lead single, "I Can't Live a Dream" (another Valli cover), fell short of the top 40.

=== Television era ===
In 1976, ABC offered Donny and Marie their own television show, The Donny & Marie Show. George demanded that the Osmond Brothers work behind the scenes on the show. The family and ABC built and operated Osmond Studios, a first-class television studio in Orem, Utah, where the show was produced beginning in 1977. As a result, the Osmonds as a performing band became a lower priority to Donny and Marie. The older brothers deferred or gave up their dreams of being a rock-and-roll band, although Donny and Marie as a duo continued to record hits into 1978. Alan recalled not having regrets at the decision, noting that they were able to fulfill a dream while at the same time escaping the hedonism of Hollywood by building the Osmond Studios in Utah. In an interview with The Lost 45s, Wayne Osmond suggested their abandonment of songwriting and not working on material during the TV run may have been a mistake, as their career never recovered from the hiatus. Various members of the family struggled with the transition; Donny experienced stage anxiety, Merrill struggled with bipolar disorder, and Marie had a brief bout with an eating disorder after a network executive told her she looked heavy. Both Donny and Marie were offered roles in the 1978 film adaptation of the hit musical Grease, with Donny being considered for the role of the Teen Angel and Marie for the role of Sandy; Marie turned the role down, concerned that the character's rebellious turn at the end was not a fit for her. Donny and Marie instead chose to star in Goin' Coconuts, under the belief that it would be more family-friendly, which ended up being a critical and commercial failure.

The Donny & Marie Show was canceled in 1979, and the Osmonds found themselves in debt and without a clear direction. The group switched from Polydor to corporate affiliate Mercury Records and released another album, Steppin' Out, was a transitional album for the Osmonds and was produced by Maurice Gibb, as Curb had temporarily left the recording industry after being unexpectedly elected Lieutenant Governor of California. Among its tracks was the first recorded version of "Rest Your Love on Me", a country song that became a hit for Gibb's group, the Bee Gees, and topped the country charts in a cover version by Conway Twitty. Steppin' Out itself was a major failure, with the album failing to chart and its only charting single, "You're Mine", reaching only to No. 138 on the Record World charts; it would be their only album on the Mercury label.

The family also produced two unsuccessful projects for Marie, a sitcom pilot that never aired and a variety show revival that lasted seven episodes in 1980 and 1981. The family also fell prey to embezzlers who came on as business partners to help finance the television show; several went to prison for their crimes.

George Osmond refused to let the family declare bankruptcy and ordered his children honor all of their financial obligations by whatever means necessary, effectively forcing the Osmonds to return to the road. Donny was largely exempted from this requirement, as George had correctly determined that Donny's marriage would eliminate his bankability and end his career. Donny, angry at being typecast as a teen idol, retreated from the public spotlight shortly thereafter. The family paid off their debts by 1983.

=== After television ===
In the early 1980s, the original four Osmond Brothers began performing as a country music quartet, recording a number of minor hits on the country charts, the most successful of which was the top-20 hit "I Think About Your Lovin'." Merrill also made a brief foray into solo work during this period and secured a minor chart hit with "You're Here to Remember (I'm Here to Forget)," a duet with Jessica Boucher. As Marie and Donny made comebacks in their respective country and pop music fields in the late 1980s, Donny made an effort to cut his brothers in on the revival of interest in the Osmonds, but feuds with their former benefactor Mike Curb and Alan beginning to show symptoms of progressive multiple sclerosis largely ended the brothers' recording careers. The family continued to tour and perform in Branson, Missouri in the 1990s and 2000s. In 1986, Alan began training his four oldest sons (Michael, Nathan, Doug and David Osmond) to serve as a "second generation" of the Osmond family. The Osmonds 2nd Generation had minor touring success in the late 1980s and early 1990s before joining their uncles, father and eventually their younger brothers and cousins in Branson. David and Nathan continue to perform as solo performers, in addition to occasionally reuniting with their brothers. Alan was no longer touring by 2004, but he appeared at the family's 50th anniversary concert in 2007. Wayne retired in 2012 following a stroke. Jimmy joined his brothers in later years, in addition to his solo performances as an actor, until he withdrew from the public spotlight in 2019 following a stroke of his own.

The four original Osmond Brothers made their last two appearances together in 2018 and 2019, appearing at a concert in Honolulu in the former case, and on The Talk (where Marie was serving as co-host) in the latter; they acknowledged that Marie had arranged the reunions to earn them some spending money. Merrill and Jay made some appearances in 2019, occasionally with David Osmond, but had split from each other by the end of 2019, as by then, Merrill had described himself as the last of the Osmond Brothers still in the band and Jay was touring and performing separately. Merrill substantially curtailed his touring schedule in 2022 but continues to occasionally perform and record new music. Jay, as of 2026, is a midday host at radio station KQEO in Idaho Falls, Idaho and is scheduled to tour the United Kingdom in late 2027. Donny continues to maintain a full performance schedule, including a permanent Las Vegas residency in 2026.

Wayne Osmond died January 1, 2025, following another stroke. Alan Osmond died April 20, 2026 following a long, slow decline related to his multiple sclerosis.

== Legacy ==
The Osmonds rank among the poorest performers in terms of having their hits of the 1970s survive in recurrent rotation; classic hits and oldies stations rarely play any of their music, with the occasional exception of "One Bad Apple". According to Sean Ross at RadioInsight, discussing the fifteen popular songs of 1971 that saw the biggest declines in airplay:

Teen acts had been with us from the beginning, of course, but not since the early '60s had they seemed so particularly stigmatized (...) Five songs by teen idols – four of them Osmonds-related. We haven't shown individual breakouts for every year of the '70s, but we can tell you that there's an Osmonds-related song every year between 1971 and 1976, except for 1973, when Donny Osmond was being challenged by the DeFranco Family and didn't have a big enough hit.

Ross later noted of the top 100 songs in the 1970 to 1974 period ranked by a drop-off in airplay, the Osmond family had six listed, the most of any collection of acts; this was twice as high as the next two artists on the list—Cher and Helen Reddy, each of whom recorded three. The Osmond family as a whole ranked the most neglected musical act of the era of the classic hit, from 1970 to 1994. Broadening to the period of 1960 to 1999, the top 100 most neglected songs (which had a disproportionate number of early 1960s songs largely neglected by modern radio) had three performed by at least one Osmond, tied for the most with Connie Francis on the list; this was especially unusual because other neglected 1970s artists such as Reddy and Barbra Streisand failed to make the broader list at all. Such was the Osmonds' fall into obscurity that Donny's son Chris advanced all the way to the final episode of season 2 of Claim to Fame largely because most of the contestants were repeatedly unaware who Donny was. Jay Osmond's second wife Karina had previously claimed that she "didn't know anything about the Osmonds" before meeting him, but she retracted this in 2025, noting that it was the Osmonds' fame for being well-mannered that allowed her to trust Jay.

The Osmonds have seen occasional admirers among professional musicians, particularly with a reassessment of their rock era work. Guitarist Paul Gilbert ranked the hard rock Phase III album as one of his "not-so-guilty pleasures" and stating "Do not underestimate Merrill Osmond in 1971". An obituary in Forbes lauded Wayne Osmond's guitar work with the band and his rock influence, describing him as a "criminally overlooked shredder."

=== Stage musicals ===
The Osmonds, a musical based on the family's career, was commissioned by Jay Osmond and debuted with a tour of the United Kingdom in 2022. Its United States debut is slated for 2027.

Can You Hear the Music is a musical revue that debuted in 2026, which earned the endorsement of Merrill Osmond.

== Awards and nominations ==
On July 5, 1986, the Osmond Brothers were awarded lifetime membership in the Barbershop Harmony Society.

On August 7, 2003, the Osmond family were honored for their achievements in the entertainment industry with a star on the Hollywood Walk of Fame in Los Angeles, California.

== Band members ==
The members of the band transitioned from exclusively vocal performance to playing instruments, all around the time that Crazy Horses was released.

Band members

- Merrill Osmond – vocals (1959–2019); bass guitar (1970–2019)
- Donny Osmond – vocals (1963–1979, occasional afterward); keyboards (1970–1979)
- Alan Osmond – vocals (1959–2007); rhythm guitar (1968–2007) (died 2026)
- Wayne Osmond – vocals (1959–2007); lead guitar (1970–2007) (died 2025)
- Jay Osmond – vocals (1959–2019); drums (1970–2019)
- Jimmy Osmond – vocals (1992–2018)

== Discography ==
=== Studio albums ===
- Songs We Sang on the Andy Williams Show (1963)
- We Sing You a Merry Christmas (1963)
- The Osmond Brothers Sing the All Time Hymn Favorites (1964)
- The New Sound of The Osmond Brothers (1965)
- The Wonderful World of The Osmond Brothers (1968)
- Hello! The Osmond Brothers (1970)
- Osmonds (1971)
- Homemade (1971)
- Phase III (1972)
- Crazy Horses (1972)
- The Plan (1973)
- Love Me for a Reason (1974)
- The Proud One (1975)
- Brainstorm (1976)
- Osmond Christmas Album (1976)
- Steppin' Out (1979)
- The Osmond Brothers (1982)
- One Way Rider (1984)
- I Can't Get There Without You (2012)

== Tours ==
- The Osmonds First National Tour (1971)
- The Osmonds Second National Tour (1972)
- The Plan Tour (1973)
- The Osmonds Summer Tour (1974)
- The Osmonds Summer Tour (1975)
- The Osmonds Summer Tour (1976)
- The Osmonds Summer Tour (1977)
- UK/Australia/Asia Tour (1980)
- 50th Anniversary Tour (2008)
- Final Tour – Up Close & Personal (2012)
