= Andrew Osmond (novelist) =

Andrew Osmond (born 4 March 1967) is a contemporary British novelist.

== Literary career ==
Osmond is the author of cult fiction titles such as Big Fish (2004), High (2004) and Young British Slacker (2006). Big Fish was described by Spike as a must read for wannabe globe-trotters, armchair travellers and mystery fans, alike. Midwest Book Reviews said of Young British Slacker: "...compels the readers' attention with its unique writing style and tactile-perfect realism in its stream of consciousness thoughts and emotions of a wage slave."
