= Herb Sheldon =

American television personality and entertainer

Herb Sheldon (born Herbert Sussman in Brooklyn, New York, January 1913 - July 21, 1964) was an American television personality and entertainer.

== Television career ==
Sheldon was originally slated to train for a career in textiles, but a scholarship at the American Academy of Dramatic Arts and some work in the theater sidetracked his plans.

He worked in some Broadway shows in small character parts. Eventually, he left the stage for a career as a radio broadcaster. Sheldon made his radio debut on WINS Radio as the host and interviewer and as a performer of a daily talk/variety show in 1941. The show became a hit with NYC's listeners and from there he went on to a long and successful career mc'ing several programs, including one with interviewer Maggie McNellis (Sheldon And McNellis At The Latin Quarter).

Sheldon made his TV debut on WNBT-TV in New York City in 1946, with the first of several children's TV shows Kids Today on WNBT. From 1946 to 1956, he hosted such kids shows as Saturdays With Herb Sheldon, Sheldon At Six, Kids Today, and One Is For Sheldon

Sheldon's tenure at WRCA was short-lived: he violated his contract with WNBT by also working for other stations in the city. After contract was terminated he joined WABD TV Channel 5 as the host of their kids TV shows. He succeeded Sandy Becker as the second host of their successful Sunday comedy/variety kids TV show Wonderama

He also hosted a teens rock and roll dance and music program Studio Party and a late night old movie show Rickey Tickey Playhouse. He again had problems with management for working for other stations, and for working as an MC for nightclub acts. Sheldon was ousted by WABD TV's management on August 8, 1958.

He briefly served as the host of two TV shows for WNTA TV Channel 13 in Newark, N.J. "Hold That Camera" (a late night TV game show for adults) and "Funderama" (a Saturday morning clone of Wonderama) in 1958 and 1959.

On Monday September 14, 1959, Herb Sheldon succeeded Paul Tripp as the third host of WOR-TV Channel 9 NYC's Looney Tunes Show. Sheldon wore a straw skimmer, bow tie and striped blazer, and set the show against the backdrop of an enchanted cottage in the woods; he would entertain his viewers between the reruns of the cartoons. The show was so popular that the program's title was soon changed to The Herb Sheldon Show. He also hosted The Mischief Makers (the syndicated title for the silent Little Rascals films) weekday evenings on WOR from Monday September 19, 1960 to Friday June 9, 1961.

== Retirement ==
Sheldon continued to host the stations TV's kids shows until heart problems forced him to retire from regular TV work on May 18, 1962.

During his retirement years, he co-owned a restaurant in Hempstead, N.Y. and also staged, produced and performed in plays at two theaters that he owned, The Tinkerpond Playhouse in Syosset, New York, and The Montauk Point Playhouse. Sheldon also worked with many charities, most notably The United Cerebrial Palsy Telethons with Jane Pickens Hoving, Dennis James and Steve Lawrence and Eydie Gorme.

He succumbed to a massive heart attack on July 21, 1964, at age 51.
