= Wayne Osmond =

American musician (1951–2025)

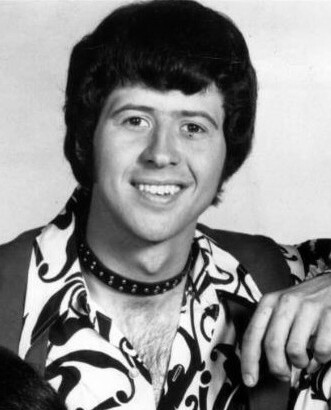
- Osmond in 1971
- Born: Melvin Wayne Osmond; August 28, 1951; Ogden, Utah, U.S.
- Died: January 1, 2025 (aged 73); Salt Lake City, Utah, U.S.
- Occupations: Singer; songwriter; record producer
- Years active: 1959–2014, 2018–2019
- Spouse: Kathlyn White (m. 1974)
- Children: 5
- Parents: George Osmond; Olive Davis
- Musical career
- Genres: Bubblegum; pop rock; country
- Instruments: Vocals; guitar
- Labels: MGM; Kolob; Uni; Denon; Polydor; Mercury; Elektra; Curb; Warner Bros.; Range
- Formerly of: The Osmonds

Melvin Wayne Osmond (August 28, 1951 – January 1, 2025) was an American musician. He was the second-oldest of the original Osmond Brothers singers and the fourth oldest of the nine Osmond siblings.

== The Osmonds ==
Starting in 1958, Wayne and three of his brothers (Alan, Merrill, and Jay) began singing as a barbershop quartet. They were later discovered in 1961 by Jay Emerson Williams, the father of Andy Williams, at a performance at Disneyland which was being filmed for the "Disneyland After Dark"⁷ episode of Walt Disney's Wonderful World of Color. In 1962, the four Osmonds were cast over a seven-year period on NBC's The Andy Williams Show, a musical variety program. After their early singles failed, MGM Records signed the band, inspired by the success of the Jackson 5, and sent them to Muscle Shoals, where they recorded One Bad Apple, a song initially written for the Jacksons but rejected by their label. Each of these four Osmond brothers were also cast in nine episodes of the 1963–1964 ABC Western series, The Travels of Jaimie McPheeters, with Wayne in the role of young Leviticus Kissel.

In the band's rock formation, Osmond played guitar and occasionally drums, among many other instruments. Shortly before his death, Osmond stated that he learned to play eight instruments during his time with the band. He was found to have perfect pitch and took over the vocal arrangement duties from his mother once he was old enough to do so. His guitar work and songwriting contributions were particularly influential on the group's rock tracks, with an obituary in Forbes lauding him as an "overlooked shredder(.)"

His last intended appearance with the Osmonds was October 13, 2018; however, the four brothers performed as a group a year later at CBS daytime show The Talk, as a birthday present to their sister, Marie.

== Personal life and death ==
Osmond was born on August 28, 1951, to Olive May (née Davis; 1925–2004) and George Virl Osmond (1917–2007) in Ogden, Utah. He was the fourth of nine children. Like the rest of his family, he was a member of the Church of Jesus Christ of Latter-day Saints, mainly because he "like(d) being part of that organization," one that aligned with his personal values. In 2004, he said of his faith: "we have a very high moral and ethical code that we live by ... it's not something that's forced upon us. Anyone can do what they want to; everyone has their free agency. In fact, that's God's greatest gift to mankind, his free agency." He also noted that he had never felt substantial temptation to engage in the stereotypical sinful activities such as affairs, vulgar language or substance abuse.

On December 13, 1974, Osmond married Kathlyn White from Bountiful, Utah, a former Miss Davis County Fair and Miss Utah of 1974. They had five children, three daughters and two sons. In the 1990s, Osmond moved to Branson, Missouri. In 1997, he was diagnosed with a brain tumor, which was successfully treated at the expense of his hearing; the treatment left Osmond nearly deaf and reliant on a cochlear implant. He continued to tour and perform with Merrill and Jay (Alan had left the touring production due to multiple sclerosis), until a stroke in 2012 left him unable to play guitar. He held a pilot's certificate, from which he earned the nickname "Wings," and continued to fly aircraft until mobility issues prevented him from doing so near the end of his life. He also mentored Alan's son David Osmond, who had followed in the Osmond family musical tradition.

Osmond suffered another, more severe stroke and died at the University of Utah Hospital in Salt Lake City, Utah, on January 1, 2025, at the age of 73.

== See also ==
- List of people with brain tumors
