= Disneyland After Dark =

- Walt Disney's Wonderful World of Color episode
- Episode no.: Season 8 Episode 26
- Directed by: Hamilton Luske; William Beaudine; Bernard McEveety
- Written by: Larry Clemmons
- Cinematography by: Gordon Avil
- Editing by: Lloyd L. Richardson
- Original air date: April 15, 1962
- Running time: 0:49:12

Guest appearances
- The Osmond Brothers; Annette Funicello; Bobby Burgess; Bobby Rydell; Louis Armstrong; Monette Moore

"Disneyland After Dark" is an episode of Walt Disney's Wonderful World of Color that aired April 15, 1962 on NBC. Later, it was released theatrically both nationally and internationally as a short subject.

As the name of the episode implies, Walt Disney presents, in person, a view of Disneyland at night. It features some nighttime entertainment, including a fireworks display (complete with Tinker Bell flying across the sky) and Tahitian dancers performing for Adventureland dinner patrons. However, this episode focuses less on Disneyland itself and more on the many celebrity singers at the different sections of the park, including the Osmond Brothers, former Mouseketeers Annette Funicello and Bobby Burgess, teen heartthrob Bobby Rydell, Monette Moore, and Louis Armstrong. In a running gag, Walt Disney introduces but is unable to attend these attractions and performances, being pinned down by an endless supply of autograph seekers (including a repeat customer) throughout the program.

== Home media ==
The short was released on December 4, 2001, on Walt Disney Treasures: Disneyland, USA and presented in its original, uncut NBC broadcast presentation.
