= Alan Osmond =

American musician (1949–2026)

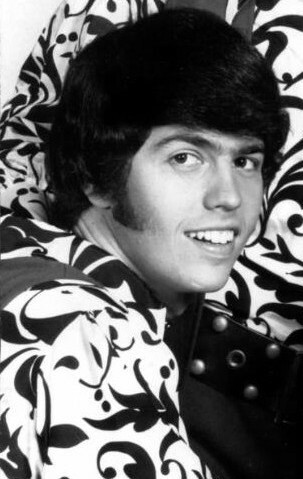
- Osmond in 1971
- Born: Alan Ralph Osmond; June 22, 1949; Ogden, Utah, U.S.
- Died: April 20, 2026 (aged 76); Lehi, Utah, U.S.
- Occupations: Singer; songwriter; record producer
- Years active: 1959–2007, 2018–2019
- Spouse: Suzanne Pinegar (m. 1974)
- Children: 8, including David
- Parents: George Osmond; Olive Davis
- Musical career
- Genres: Bubblegum; pop rock; country
- Instruments: Vocals; guitar; piano
- Labels: MGM; Kolob; Uni; Denon; Polydor; Mercury; Elektra; Curb; Warner Bros.; Range
- Formerly of: The Osmonds

Alan Ralph Osmond (June 22, 1949 – April 20, 2026) was an American musician. He was a member of the family musical group The Osmonds. Prior to that, Alan (aged 12) and his brothers performed as the Osmond Brothers Boys' Quartet. He served as the leader of the group.

== Early life ==
Alan Ralph Osmond was born on June 22, 1949, in Ogden, Utah, the son of Olive May (née Davis; 1925–2004) and George Virl Osmond (1917–2007). He was the oldest of the seven siblings who could sing, as the two oldest brothers, Virl and Tom, are hearing impaired.

== Music career ==
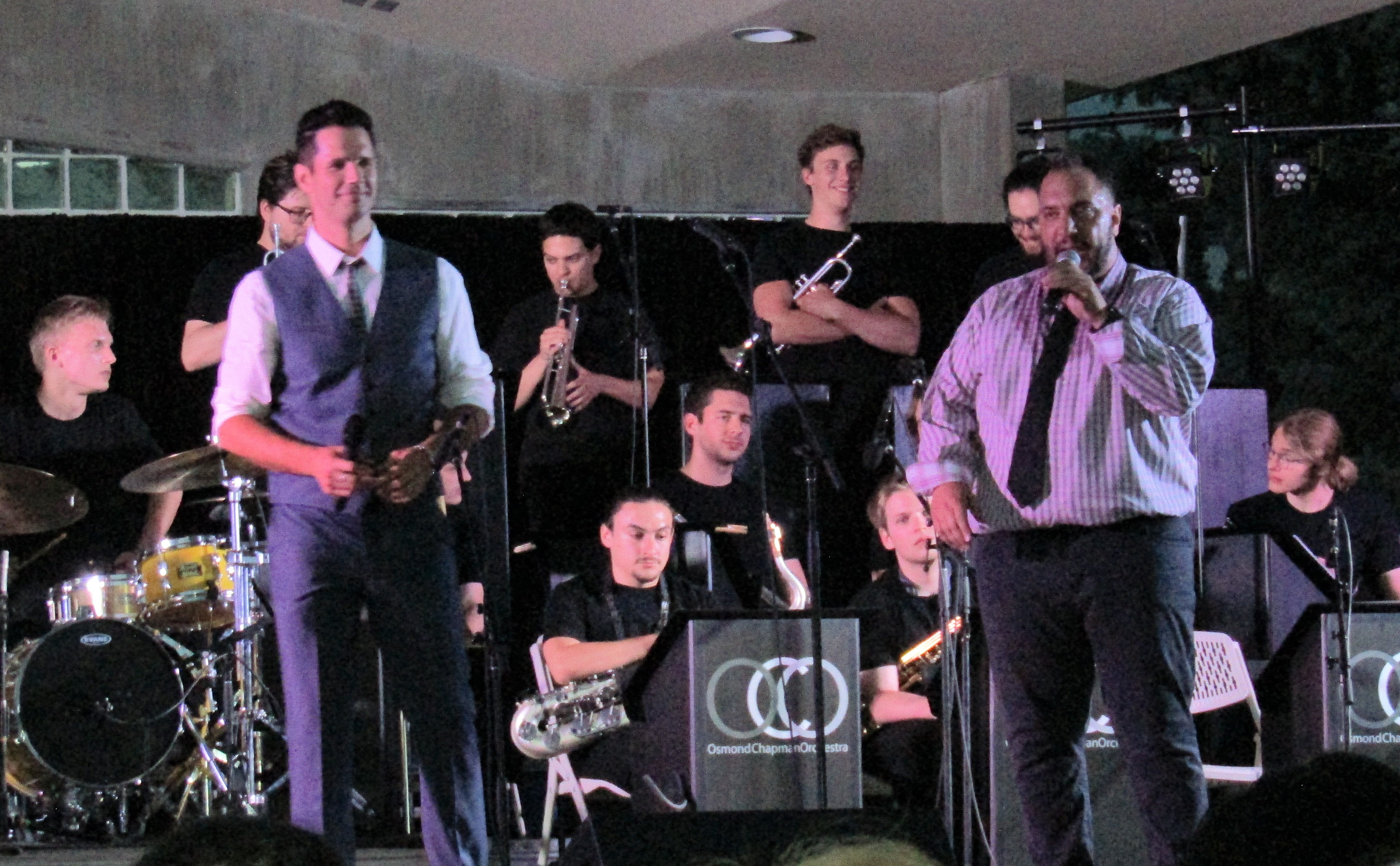
David Osmond (front left) with the Osmond Chapman Orchestra.

Starting in 1958, Alan and three of his younger brothers (Wayne, Merrill, and Jay in their respective age orders) began singing as a barbershop quartet. In 1961, the group headed to Los Angeles to audition for The Lawrence Welk Show, only for host Lawrence Welk to refuse to hear them sing; they met The Lennon Sisters at this audition, who directed them to Disneyland, where they found paying work as performers. It was at Disneyland that Jay Emerson Williams, Andy Williams's father, discovered the group. In 1962, the four Osmonds were cast over a seven-year period on NBC's The Andy Williams Show, a musical variety program. They also appeared in nine episodes of the 1963–1964 ABC western television series, The Travels of Jaimie McPheeters, with Alan in the role of young Micah Kissel.

During much of the Osmonds' career, Alan, being the oldest of the group, was the band's creative leader, playing piano and guitar, co-writing many of their songs with Merrill, co-producing most of their recordings, and arranging the dance choreography. He nevertheless seldom sang anything more than backing vocals, in contrast to his younger brothers. Leading The Osmonds at a young age, Alan was called "No. 1" by his brothers.

He mostly stopped performing with the group after 2007, and what he professed to be his final performance with them was October 13, 2018, at Neal Blaisdell Arena in Honolulu, although, Alan did appear for a get-together with Jay, Wayne and Merrill in 2019, as per request for their sister Marie Osmond's 60th birthday. He was still writing songs at the time of his last performances, including a composition to celebrate the centennial anniversary of Orem, Utah.

== Personal life ==
Alan, like all the Osmonds, was a member of The Church of Jesus Christ of Latter-day Saints.

Alan enlisted in the California Army National Guard in the late 1960s. He served at Fort Ord in northern California as a 144th artillery unit clerk. During his time in the service, he was known as the Mormon Dream.

In 1980, Alan Osmond, along with his brother Merrill Osmond, created Stadium of Fire, which has become one of the largest Independence Day celebrations in the United States. He stated that this, along with his move into country music in the early 1980s, was a reflection of their patriotic values: "we're kind of flag-wavers. You find that in the country area, too." Stadium of Fire also reflected his lifelong love of pyrotechnics, such that Osmond arranged for a daytime fireworks display for his funeral.

In September 2024, Osmond released his autobiography, One Way Ticket.

=== Health ===
Osmond began to experience dysfunction in his right hand during an Osmond Brothers concert in 1987. He was later diagnosed with progressive multiple sclerosis (MS), which he publicly announced during the MDA Labor Day Telethon in 1994. The Osmond Brothers initially adjusted their routines to accommodate Alan's condition before he was forced to retire from the road in the late 1990s. Osmond credited his faith, and belief in the preexistence of the soul, with giving him hope and optimism for the future in the face of his condition. In turn, Osmond credited this optimism with prolonging his life and quality thereof (mentioning as a counterexample Annette Funicello, who also began experiencing MS symptoms in 1987 but fell into deep despair afterward and eventually died 13 years before Osmond did).

=== Relationships, marriage and children ===
Osmond married Suzanne Pinegar, at the time a cheerleader at Brigham Young University, on July 16, 1974. He and Suzanne had eight sons, including entertainer David Osmond.

Osmond had initially warned his children against following him into the entertainment business because of the touring commitments but later relented, stating his pride in his children following in the Osmond family tradition. The four oldest performed as the Osmond Boys beginning in 1986, and later expanded to include the younger brothers as The Osmonds Second Generation. At the time of his death, he had 30 grandchildren and five great-grandchildren.

Prior to his marriage, Osmond dated extensively, including a brief courtship with singer Karen Carpenter in the early 1970s.

=== Death ===
Osmond died at his home in Lehi, Utah, on April 20, 2026, at the age of 76. He had spent a week hospitalized in intensive care before returning home to receive hospice care four days before his death. He was buried at Spanish Fork City Cemetery in Spanish Fork. Osmond’s younger brother Wayne passed away the previous year at the age of 73.

== Awards ==
In November 2021, Alan and Suzanne Osmond were honored as Pillars of Utah Valley. In 2000, Alan Osmond received the Dorothy Corwin Spirit of Life Award from the National Multiple Sclerosis Society. In his acceptance speech, he stated that he had done some time in the military reserve and that he had taken karate lessons from Chuck Norris, both of which reinforced the "you can do it" attitude that he learned from his father. His motto was, "I may have MS, but MS does NOT have me!" He ran the OneHeart Foundation, which Alan and his wife founded, and also worked as a motivational speaker.

In 1986, Alan and his brothers were granted an honorary lifetime membership into the Society for the Preservation and Encouragement of Barber Shop Quartet Singing in America.
