= Merrill Osmond =

American musician (born 1953)

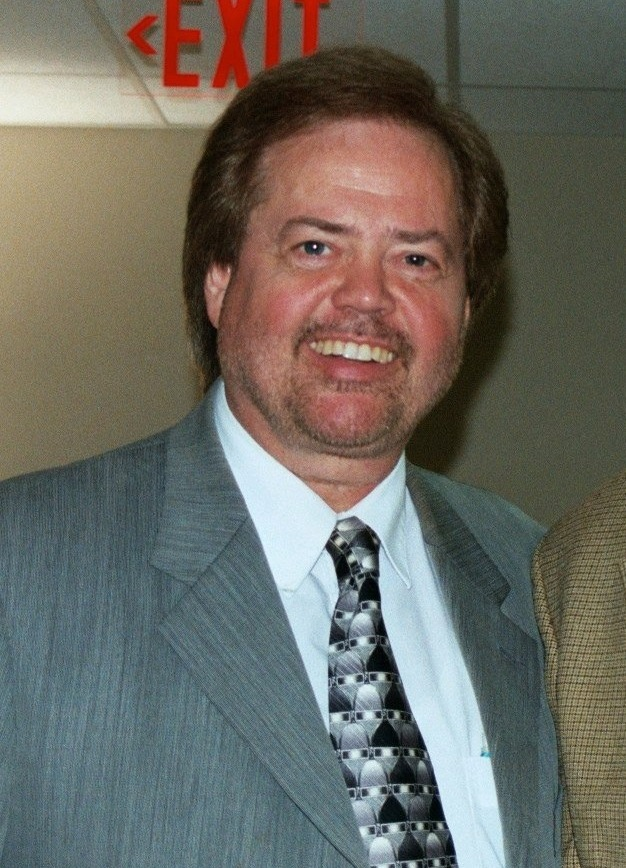
- Osmond in 2002
- Born: Merrill Davis Osmond; April 30, 1953 (age 73); Ogden, Utah, U.S.
- Occupations: Singer; songwriter
- Years active: 1959–present
- Spouse: Mary Carlson (m. 1973)
- Children: 6
- Parents: George Osmond; Olive Davis
- Musical career
- Genres: Bubblegum; pop rock; country
- Instruments: Vocals; bass
- Labels: MGM; Kolob; Uni; Denon; Polydor; Mercury; Elektra; Curb; Warner Bros.; Range
- Formerly of: The Osmonds
- Website: merrillosmond.com

Merrill Davis Osmond (born April 30, 1953) is an American musician. He is best known for being the lead vocalist and bassist of the family music group The Osmonds and The Osmond Brothers, as well as an occasional solo artist.

== Early life ==
Osmond was born in Ogden, Utah, the fifth of the nine children of Olive May (née Davis; 1925–2004) and George Virl Osmond (1917–2007).

== The Osmonds ==
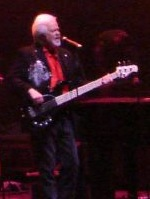
Osmond performing in 2008

Starting in 1958, Merrill and three of his brothers (Alan, Wayne, and Jay in their respective age orders) began singing as a barbershop quartet. They were later discovered in 1961 by Jay Emerson Williams, Andy Williams's father, at a performance at Disneyland which was being filmed for the Disneyland After Dark episode of Walt Disney's Wonderful World of Color. In 1962, the four Osmonds were regular guests over a seven-year period on NBC's The Andy Williams Show, a musical variety program. They also appeared in nine episodes of the 1963–64 ABC western television series The Travels of Jaimie McPheeters, with Merrill in the role of young Deuteronomy Kissel.

A tenor/countertenor vocalist well into adulthood, Merrill was either lead singer or co-lead singer (usually sharing duties with younger brother Donny) on almost all of the Osmonds' songs and co-wrote, along with older brother Alan, many of them. Jay Osmond, in his development of the Osmonds musical, described Merrill as having the strongest business acumen of the brothers. In the early 1980s, Merrill grew out his beard, let it naturally go gray, and, along with his brothers, shifted to country music, placing singles on the country charts in the 1980s; he also had a single independent of his fellow Osmonds, a duet with session singer Jessica Boucher (younger sister of Savannah and Sherry Boucher), "You're Here to Remember (I'm Here to Forget)," which peaked at number 62 on the Hot Country Singles chart in 1987. Osmond announced his intent to retire from performing in 2022 and performed his last American show in April of that year, with a UK tour to follow. Merrill's final show took place at the barn, Ringwood on January 19, 2023. Since then, he has performed a limited number of special engagements each year. As of early 2024, there were plans to have Nathan Osmond, one of Alan's sons, replace Merrill in certain Osmond enterprises, such as the family's Branson residencies. In April 2026, he announced that he had been recording a new solo album, Unbroken, along with two albums of collaborations with his children and grandchildren.

== Other works ==
Osmond has sporadically hosted the podcast Sound Advice with his son Justin since 2020, produced by KSL radio.

Osmond's autobiography, Black Bear: My Life Story, was released in July 2025.

== Personal life ==
Merrill was the first of the performing Osmond siblings to marry. He wed Mary Carlson on September 17, 1973; they have four sons, two daughters, and 15 grandchildren. Merrill's second son, Justin, is deaf, as are Justin's uncles, Virl and Tom Osmond, Merrill's two oldest brothers. Justin Osmond works with several organizations and launched the Olive Osmond Perpetual Hearing Fund in 2010. Merrill's youngest son, Troy, died in his sleep at age 33 on November 9, 2018 from an undiagnosed heart condition. Merrill's son Travis Osmond performed with the Osmond Brothers irregularly from 1991 until Merrill's retirement in 2024; Travis stated he did not want to pursue a career as a touring musician and instead pursued a career in agriculture, following in a tradition of his great-uncles.

Like the rest of his family, Merrill is a member of the Church of Jesus Christ of Latter-day Saints. A statement of faith on his Web site expresses support for the Book of Mormon and the prophecies of Joseph Smith, as well as the church's compatibility with mainstream Christianity. In keeping with church tradition, all his sons have served as missionaries.

In a 2021 interview with GB News, Osmond described himself as "very conservative" person. He expressed mixed feelings toward former President Donald Trump, noting that his experience with Trump was that Trump was a "nice guy" but that Osmond was never comfortable with the way Trump spoke.

Merrill and his wife served as missionaries for their church at the Washington, D.C. temple in 2022.

== Awards and honours ==
In May 2017, he received an honorary doctorate in humanities from Dixie State University, now known as Utah Tech University.
