= Jay Osmond =

American musician (born 1955)

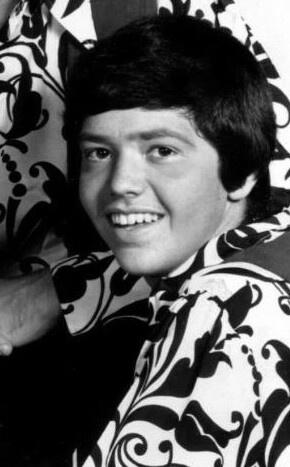
- Osmond in 1971
- Born: Jay Wesley Osmond; March 2, 1955 (age 71); Ogden, Utah, U.S.
- Occupations: Singer; film producer; television producer
- Years active: 1959–present
- Spouses: Kandilyn Harris (m. 1987; div. 2011) Karen Randall (m. 2014)
- Children: 3
- Parents: George Osmond; Olive Davis
- Musical career
- Genres: Bubblegum; pop rock; country
- Instruments: Vocals; drums; percussion
- Labels: MGM; Kolob; Uni; Denon; Polydor; Mercury; Elektra; Curb; Warner Bros.; Range
- Formerly of: The Osmonds
- Website: jayosmond.com

Jay Wesley Osmond (born March 2, 1955) is an American musician. He is a member of the Osmond family of performers. He wrote the story to the 2022 musical The Osmonds, a musical based on the life and music of the family. The musical was shown around the United Kingdom and Ireland in 2022, after being previously postponed due to the COVID-19 pandemic.

== Early life ==
Jay Wesley Osmond was born in Ogden, Utah, the sixth son of Olive May (née Davis; 1925–2004) and George Virl Osmond (1917–2007).

== The Osmonds ==
Starting in 1958, Jay and three of his older brothers (Alan, Wayne, and Merrill in their respective age orders) began singing as a barbershop quartet. They were later discovered in 1961 by Jay Emerson Williams, Andy Williams's father, at a performance at Disneyland which was being filmed for the "Disneyland After Dark" episode of Walt Disney's Wonderful World of Color. In 1962, the four Osmonds were cast over a seven-year period on NBC's The Andy Williams Show, a musical variety program:

We were under tremendous pressure whenever we performed on The Andy Williams Show. We only ever had one take to do it right. Eventually they called us the 'One Take Osmonds' because boy, we had to be right on it, there simply wasn't the time for us to make a mistake. Every week we had to do something different whether it was pianos, tap dancing, ice skating, karate or saxophones, we had to learn to do something new every week. One time they wanted me to play a drum solo and I hadn't even learnt how to play the drums; man I was six years old.

They also appeared in nine episodes of the 1963-1964 ABC western television series, The Travels of Jaimie McPheeters, with Jay in the role of young Lamentations Kissel.

Jay was primarily the group's drummer, but also sang backing vocals and played piano, trumpet, banjo and saxophone. He shared lead vocals on the group's hit "Crazy Horses", a hard rock song where it was felt Jay's more guttural voice was better suited than usual lead vocalists Merrill or Donny. Jay occasionally contributed lead vocals to other tracks, usually ones with a harder-driving sound, such as "One Way Ticket to Anywhere" and "Having a Party". Jay continued with Merrill and Wayne (later joined by Jimmy) as a member of the Osmond Brothers when the group shifted to country music in the 1980s.

Jay is last of the original four Osmond Brothers still singing full-time. As of March 2024 he began headlining his own show in Branson, Missouri.

In late 2025, Osmond began hosting middays at KQEO in Idaho Falls, Idaho.

In October 2024, Osmond began appearing as one of the rotating guest stars in Now That's What I Call a Musical, an English jukebox musical based on the Now That's What I Call Music! album series.

=== The Osmonds Musical ===
Osmond wrote the story to the 2022 musical The Osmonds. It is based on the life and music of The Osmonds musical group and family. The musical was originally set to premiere in August 2021, but had to be postponed due to the COVID-19 pandemic. The musical had its world premiere at the Curve Theatre, in Leicester, England on 3 February 2022. The musical embarked on a tour around the United Kingdom and Ireland in 2022. OFC Creations Theatre Center in Rochester, NY is set to present the North American premiere of the musical in April 2027.

== Personal life ==
Osmond dated Debbie Glenn for a period in the mid-1970s, before she left him and began dating (and would eventually marry) his brother Donny.

Jay married Kandilyn Harris on August 25, 1987. They were divorced in 2011, with Osmond later describing the marriage as a difficult one. Together, they have three sons: Jason George (born September 23, 1988), Eric Clinton (born January 2, 1991) and Marcus Jay (born January 8, 1996). Jay has three grandchildren from his oldest son Jason.

Jay married Karen "Karina" Randall, whom he met via online dating, in May 2014. Karina was a fellow divorcee and eventually became involved in the Osmonds' business enterprises, including the Osmonds musical. Karina was rumored to have never heard of The Osmonds before meeting Jay. But she denied this account, saying she was aware of the Osmonds' music career but had not been a fan. She believed the family's clean reputation and lack of scandal in the tabloids made him a more reliable potential partner than some of the other men she had encountered. Jay and Karina Osmond reside in Idaho Falls, Idaho.

His step-granddaughter London Brise Mortensen (born October 14, 2006) died in a trailer accident on September 18, 2014, at age 7.

Like the rest of his family, Jay Osmond is a member of the Church of Jesus Christ of Latter-day Saints.
