= The Andy Williams Show =

American television variety show (1962–1971)

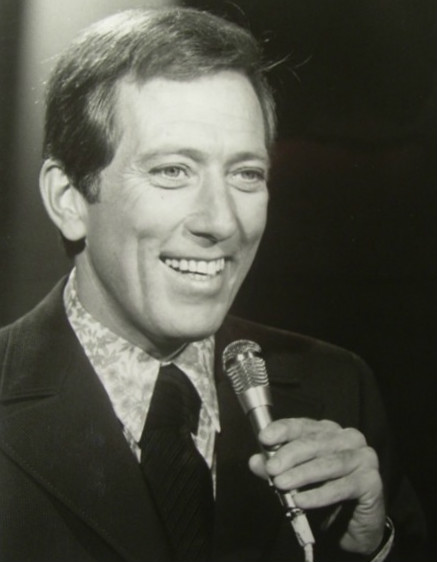
- Andy Williams in 1969
- Genre: Variety show
- Written by: John Aylesworth, Frank Peppiatt
- Presented by: Andy Williams
- Opening theme: Moon River
- Composers: Henry Mancini, Johnny Mercer
- Country of origin: United States
- Original language: English

Production
- Running time: 60 minutes
- Production company: Barnaby Productions

Original release
- Network: NBC
- Release: 1962 – 1967
- Release: 1969 – 1971
- Release: 1976 – 1977

The Andy Williams Show is an American television variety show hosted by Andy Williams that ran on NBC (and was videotaped in color) first from 1962 to 1967, then again from 1969 to 1971 (alternating during the summer of 1970 with Andy Williams Presents Ray Stevens). It became a half-hour syndicated series beginning in the fall of 1976.

== Series regulars ==
The Andy Williams Show featured a number of regular performers including:

- Dick Van Dyke (1958)
- The New Christy Minstrels (1962-1963)
- R.G. Brown (1962)
- Marian Mercer (1962)
- The Osmond Brothers (1962-1971)
- Jonathan Winters (1965-1967, 1970-1971)
- The Good Time Singers (1963-1966)
- Professor Irwin Corey (1969-1970)
- Ray Stevens (1969-1971)
- The Lennon Sisters (1970-1971)
- Charlie Callas (1970-1971)
- Janos Prohaska (The Cookie Bear) (1969-1971)

== Series synopsis ==
The first series began as a summer replacement on ABC in 1958 and on CBS in 1959. The weekly year-round series premiered on NBC in 1962, where it ran until 1967, when Williams reduced his workload to three specials a year. He returned to having a weekly series from 1969 through 1971.

At the beginning of the weekly series The New Christy Minstrels were the backup singers, but on December 20, 1962 The Osmond Brothers appeared on the show, and they became the regular backup performers for the rest of the series run.

In 1967 Williams decided to cut back to three specials per year. However, two years later he returned to weekly television in a revised format that included rock and roll acts and psychedelic lighting.

Starting with the 1969 season more emphasis was placed on comedy. Hungarian acrobat and stuntman Janos Prohaska began appearing in a bear costume, asking for cookies. The bear never got any cookies in the series, but fans began mailing baked goods to Prohaska.

Five years after his second weekly run at NBC had ended, Williams hosted a half-hour syndicated weekly variety show with Wayland Flowers and orchestra leader George Wyle.

== Awards and nominations ==
Year	Category	Nominee(s)	Result	Ref.
1963	Outstanding Variety Series	The Andy Williams Show	Won	
1963	Outstanding Performance in a Variety or Musical Program or Series	Andy Williams	Nominated	

== Partial list of guest stars ==
- Judy Garland
- Don Adams
- Jack Benny
- Joey Bishop
- Bob Hope
- Sid Caesar
- Petula Clark
- Ella Fitzgerald
- George Gobel
- Peggy Lee
- Janet Leigh
- Henry Mancini
- Vaughn Meader
- Maureen O'Hara
- The Osmonds
- André Previn
- Smothers Brothers
- Danny Thomas
- Jonathan Winters
