= Rexburg Children's Choir =

American community children's choir

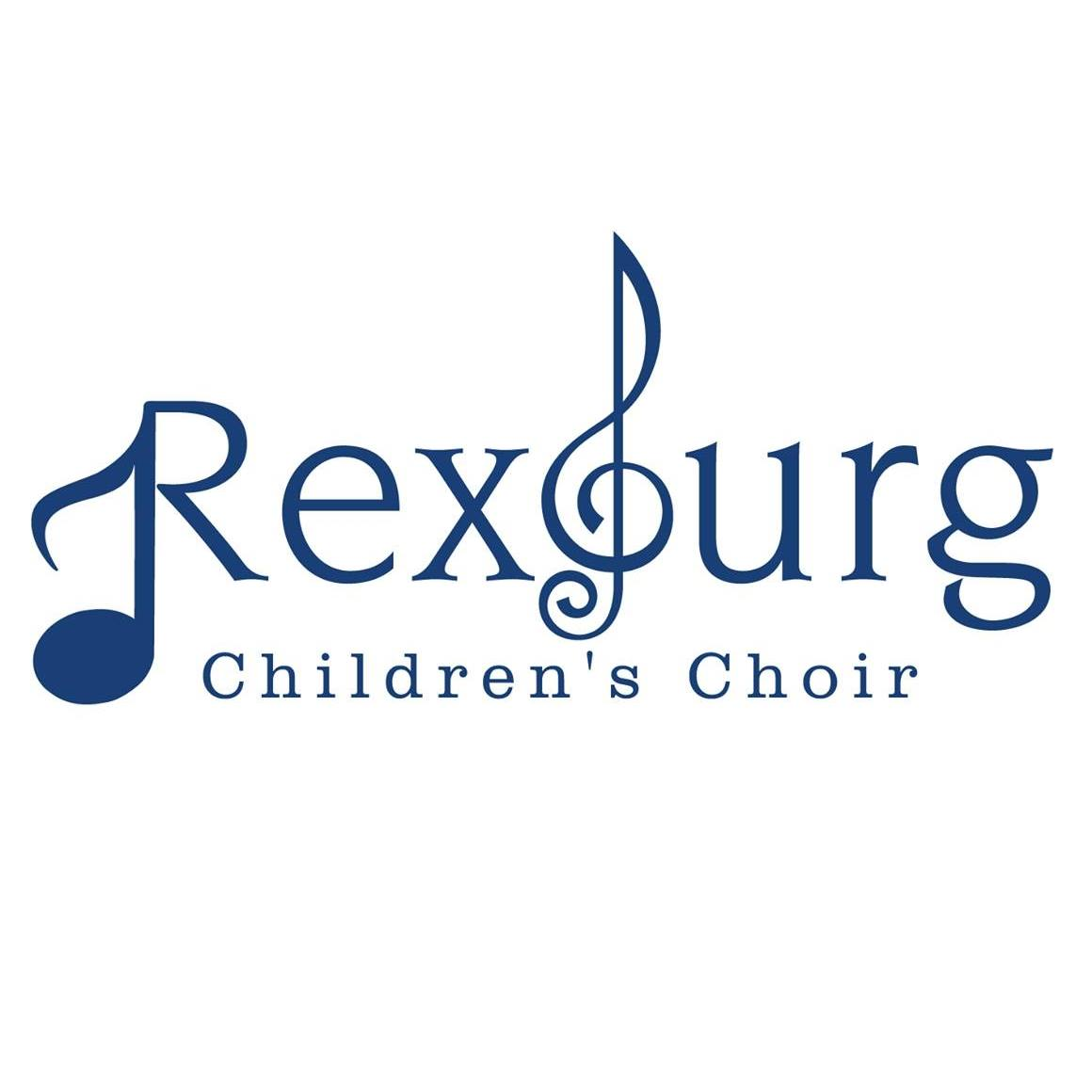
- Formation: February 6, 2018; 8 years ago
- Founder: Benjamin Watson
- Headquarters: Rexburg, Idaho
- Region served: East Idaho
- Members: 100
- Director: Benjamin Watson
- Website: www.rexburgchildrenschoir.com

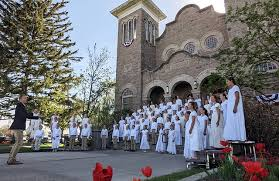
Rexburg Children's Choir

The Rexburg Children's Choir is a community children's choir headquartered in Rexburg, Idaho. Founded as a 501(c)3 nonprofit organization in 2018, the choir is composed of 100 children ages 9 to 17. Since its founding, the choir has regularly produced choral music videos and other productions in collaboration with notable artists. In 2020, NBC Nightly News with Lester Holt and Inside Edition highlighted one of the choir's productions in their national broadcasts. In 2024, Oxford University Press included the Rexburg Children's Choir as a case study in the Oxford Handbook of Community Singing.

== Founding ==
The Rexburg Children's Choir was founded as a 501(c)3, non-audition children's choral ensemble by Ben Watson on February 6, 2018, with the historic Rexburg Tabernacle as its residence for rehearsals and performances.

The motto of the choir is "Seek to express, not to impress."

== Notable projects and collaborations ==
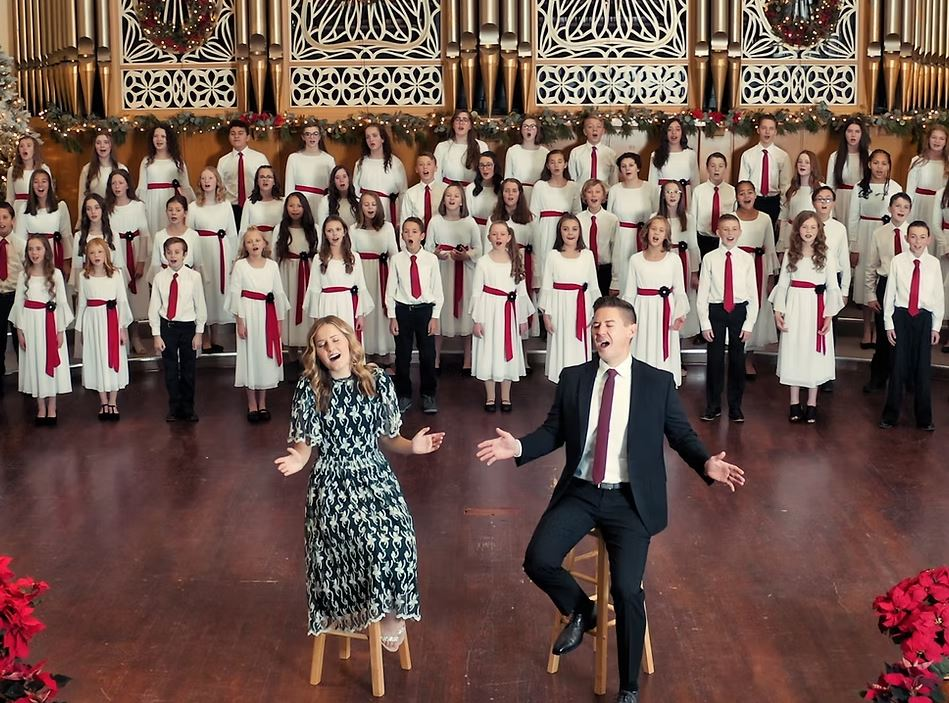
Rexburg Children's Choir performing Believe with Mat and Savanna Shaw

=== Music videos ===
- "Silent Night" with American Idol winner Iam Tongi
- "From a Distance" with American Idol alum David Archuleta
- "We Don't Talk About Bruno" with Disney Encanto star Adassa
- "Give Me Jesus" with DOVE-award winner Fernando Ortega
- "Believe" with No. 1 Billboard artists Mat and Savanna Shaw
- "Do You Hear What I Hear" with No. 1 Billboard artists GENTRI
- "Christ Is at the Helm" with Australian Broadway star Patrice Tipoki

=== Live concerts ===
The choir has performed live concerts in Rexburg with the following artists:

- Jenny Oaks Baker
- Frederica von Stade
- GENTRI
- Adassa
- 25th Army Band
- Lincoln Highway
- Mat and Savanna Shaw
- Iam Tongi

== Covid-19 green screen choir ==
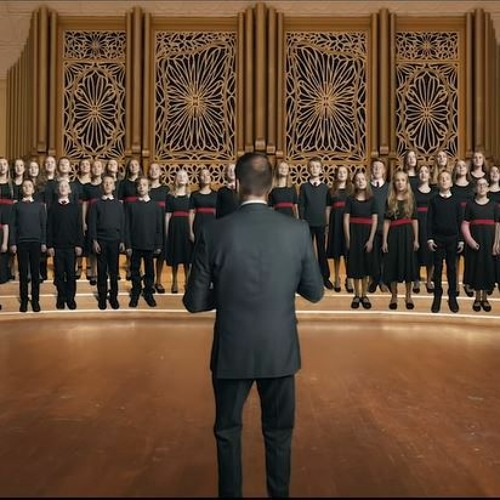
Snapshot from the green screen choir music video

In 2020, while the choir was not meeting together for rehearsals or performances during the Covid-19 pandemic, choir director Ben Watson developed a means whereby the choir would perform an arrangement of "For unto us a Child is born" from Handel's Messiah, using green screen technology. Watson recorded each child from the 100-person ensemble, one-at-a-time, singing in front of a green screen. Afterwards, the choir's videographer edited together the 100 video tracks into one video track superimposed over a background image of the interior of the Rexburg Tabernacle. What resulted was a video performance that gave the impression that there were 100 singers standing side-by-side on stage at the Rexburg Tabernacle, singing "For unto us a Child is born", when in fact they were all recorded individually, and edited to make it appear as if they were standing side-by-side.

When the video was published, NBC Nightly News with Lester Holt and Inside Edition highlighted the project in national broadcasts that week.

In 2024, the project was included as a case study on innovation in children's choral programming by the Oxford Handbook of Community Singing.
