= Stadium of Fire =

Annual celebration held in Provo, Utah, United States

Coordinates: 40°15′27″N 111°39′16″W

The Stadium of Fire is annual event held in Provo, Utah at LaVell Edwards Stadium on the campus of Brigham Young University (BYU) on or near each July 4th, celebrated as the United States' Independence Day.

The event is the culmination of a broader week of celebrations called America's Freedom Festival. The Stadium of Fire is intended as a patriotic extravaganza and features prominent musical performers (often including members of the Osmonds, who founded the event), comedians, dancers, stunt performers, tributes to military personnel and first responders and other events, along with one of the largest stadium fireworks show in the USA, all of which are televised internationally. The venue holds over 50,000 people and tends to sell most or all available seats for the Stadium of Fire, and many tens of thousands more crowd around the area to observe the fireworks.

The Stadium of Fire has been held annually in its current form every year since 1980, with the exception of 2020 due to the Covid-19 pandemic, when a televised best-of special was broadcast showing highlights from past events.

== History ==
Stadium of Fire originated as the Freedom Festival Panorama. It took on its current format and name in 1980 after Alan Osmond and Merrill Osmond acquired control of the festival.

In this era, the Osmonds developed a number of businesses or other money-making events to recover from financial losses due to their father George Osmond's bad business decisions that left the family in deep debt. Stadium of Fire reflected Alan's love of large fireworks celebrations and American patriotism. Since 1980, the Stadium of Fire has become one of the largest Independence Day celebrations in the United States with super-star performers. Since 2004, it has been created and produced by Baruch Gayton Productions.

At the 2024 Stadium of Fire event, a firework malfunction injured 26 people.

== Yearly headline performers ==
Stadium performers
Year	Performer(s)
1980	The Osmonds
1981	The Osmonds
1982	The Osmonds
1983	The Osmonds
1984	Lee Greenwood; Donny, Marie, and Jimmy Osmond
1985	Roy Clark, David Hasselhoff, Miss America Sharlene Wells, The Osmond Brothers
1986	Crystal Gayle, Mr. T, Donny & Marie Osmond
1987	Bob Hope, The Osmond Boys (2nd Generation), Miss America Kellye Cash, Thurl Bailey
1988	Rich Little; Mary Hart; Emmanuel Lewis, Osmond Brothers
1989	NBC weatherman Willard Scott, Keshia Knight Pulliam, The Osmond Boys, The Jets
1990	Osmond Family, Wayne Newton, Highway 101
1991	Andy Williams, Phylicia Rashad, Lorrie Morgan
1992	The Beach Boys
1993	Kenny Loggins, Jeffrey Osborne, Miss America Leanza Cornett
1994	The Oak Ridge Boys, Mormon Tabernacle Choir, Mickey Mouse & his ToonTown friends
1995	Barbara Mandrell, Jay Leno, Utah Symphony
1996	Donny Osmond, Kurt Bestor
1997	Natalie Cole, The Jets
1998	Huey Lewis and the News
1999	Gladys Knight, All-4-One, Harry James Orchestra, Lex de Azevedo
2000	Alabama, The Osmonds-Second Generation
2001	Sawyer Brown
2002	Toby Keith
2003	Martina McBride, Sean Hannity
2004	Reba McEntire, Sean Hannity
2005	Mandy Moore, Lonestar, Debbie Reynolds, Lucy Lawless, The Osmonds
2006	Taylor Hicks, Lee Ann Womack, Raven-Symoné
2007	Brooks & Dunn, Corbin Bleu, Glenn Beck
2008	Miley Cyrus, Blue Man Group, Glenn Beck
2009	Jonas Brothers, SHeDAISY, Glenn Beck
2010	Carrie Underwood, The 5 Browns, Jenny Oaks Baker, The Osmonds Second Generation, Eric Dodge
2011	Brad Paisley, David Archuleta, The Whits, Eve Asplund, Artie Hemphill and the Iron Horse Band
2012	The Beach Boys, Scotty McCreery, Ryan Innes
2013	Kelly Clarkson, Carly Rae Jepsen, and Cirque du Soleil
2014	Carrie Underwood, Studio C
2015	Journey, Olivia Holt and GENTRI
2016	Tim McGraw
2017	Little Big Town, Brian Regan, and Hunter Hayes
2018	OneRepublic, GENTRI and Lexi Walker
2019	Keith Urban, Chuck Norris, and Flippenout
2020	(KSL-TV Channel 5 airs a special presentation of the Best of Stadium of Fire on July 4, 2020 at 9pm due to the COVID-19 Pandemic.)
2021	Lee Greenwood, Collin Raye, David Archuleta, Jenny Oaks Baker, Millennial Choirs and Orchestras, Nitro Circus, Stadium of Fire 4One
2022	Tim McGraw, Marie Osmond
2023	Journey
2024	Jonas Brothers |Zion’s Youth Symphony and Chorus |
2025	Rascal Flatts
2026	Brad Paisley, Nitro Circus, and GENTRI

== TV Special ==
Year	Special title	Aired date and time	Station name	Channel number
2020	The Best of Stadium of Fire	July 4, 2020 9pm	KSL-TV	5
