= Gentri =

Gentri may refer to:

- General Trias, a component city in the province of Cavite, Philippines
- Gentri (musical group), the Gentlemen Trio, an American musical trio
