= Provo, Utah =

City in Utah, United States

- City
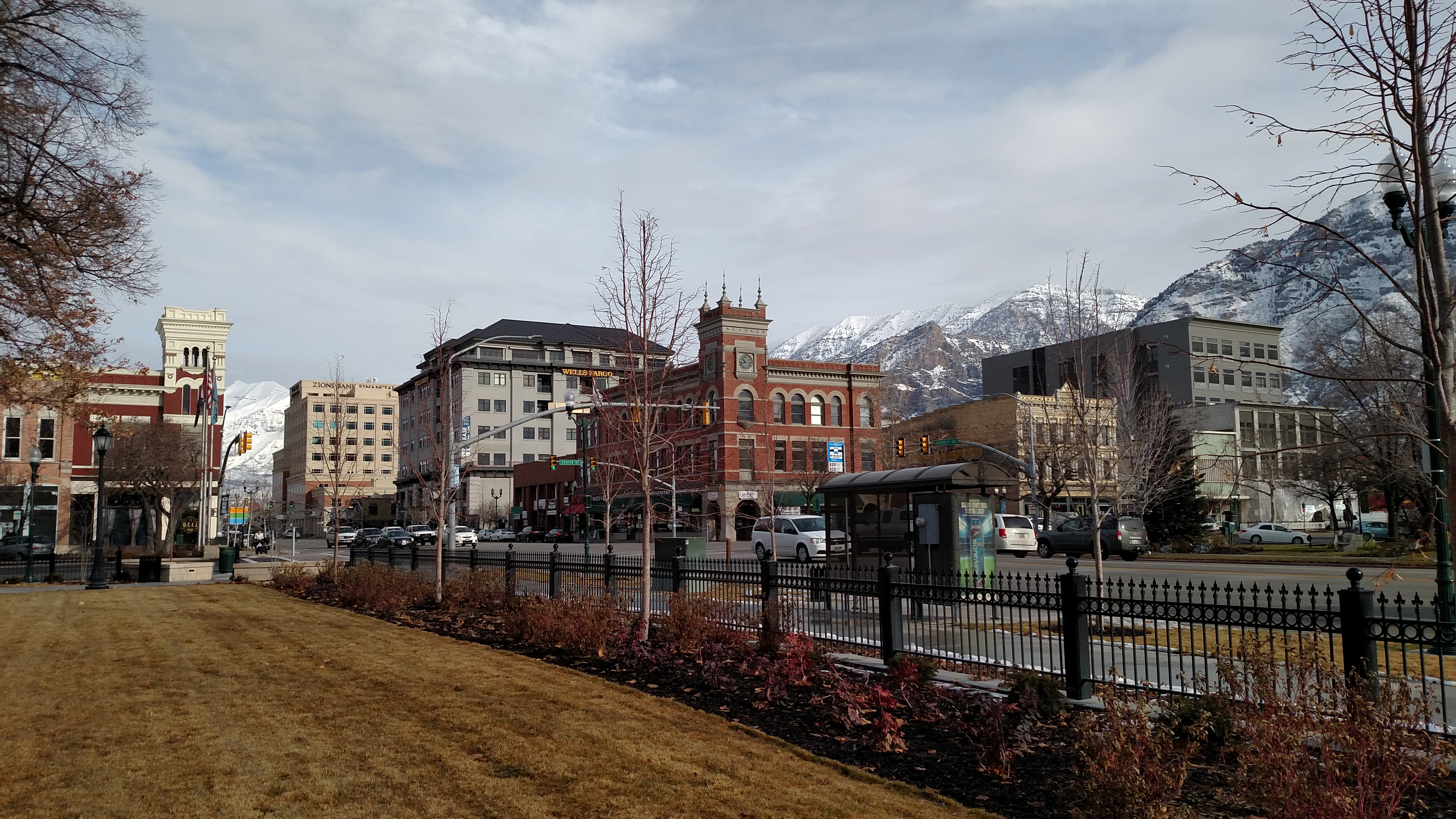
- Downtown Provo in January 2016

- Flag
- Motto: "Welcome Home"
- Interactive map of Provo, Utah
- Location within Utah Location within the United States
- Coordinates: 40°14′2″N 111°39′31″W
- Country: United States
- State: Utah
- County: Utah
- Founded: 1849
- Incorporated: April 1850
- Named for: Étienne Provost

Government
  - Type: Mayor–council
  - Mayor: Marsha Judkins

Area
  - City: 44.19 sq mi (114.44 km^{2})
  - Land: 41.69 sq mi (107.97 km^{2})
  - Water: 2.50 sq mi (6.47 km^{2})
- Elevation: 4,551 ft (1,387 m)

Population (2020)
  - City: 115,162
  - Density: 2,762.5/sq mi (1,066.61/km^{2})
  - Urban: 588,609 (US: 75th)
  - Urban density: 3,653/sq mi (1,410.6/km^{2})
  - Metro: 697,141 (US: 86th)
- Time zone: UTC−7 (Mountain (MST))
  - Summer (DST): UTC−6 (MDT)
- ZIP Codes: 84601–84606
- Area codes: 385, 801
- FIPS code: 49-62470
- Website: www.provo.gov

Provo (/ˈproʊ.voʊ/ PROH-voh) is a city in and the county seat of Utah County, Utah, United States. It had a population of 115,162 at the 2020 census, making it the fourth-most-populous city in Utah and the most populous in Utah outside the Salt Lake City metropolitan area. It is the principal city in the Provo–Orem–Lehi metropolitan area, which had a population of 671,185 at the 2020 census. Provo anchors the second-largest metropolitan area in Utah, after the Salt Lake City metropolitan area.

Provo is about 40 miles (64 km) south of Salt Lake City along the Wasatch Front, with Orem to the north and Springville to the south. Provo is the home to Brigham Young University, a private higher-education institution operated by The Church of Jesus Christ of Latter-day Saints. Provo also has the church's largest Missionary Training Center. The city is a focus area for technology development in Utah, with several billion-dollar startups. The city's Peaks Ice Arena was a venue for the 2002 Winter Olympics and is scheduled to host ice hockey again for the 2034 Winter Olympics.

== History ==
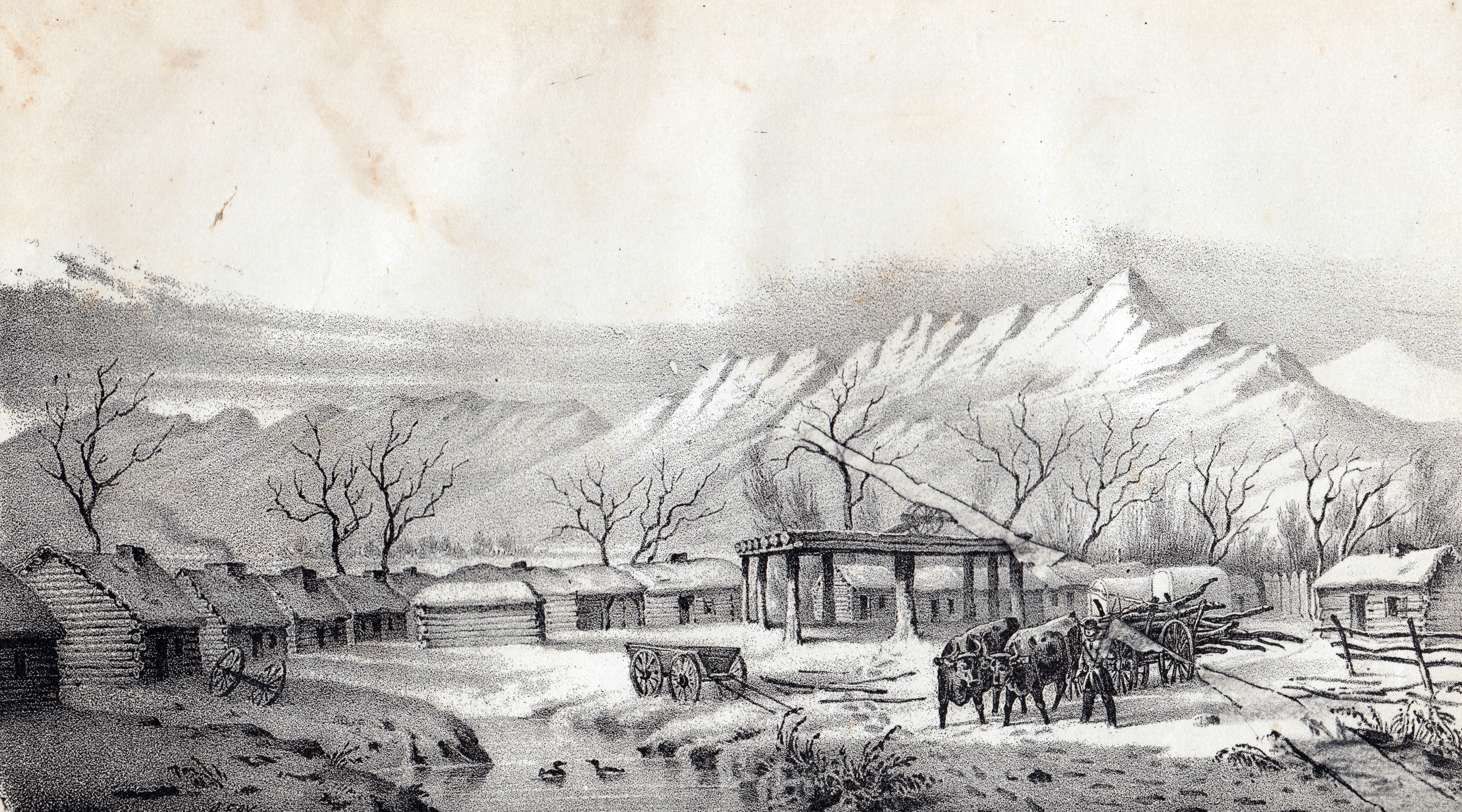
Ft. Utah in 1850

The Provo area was originally called Timpanogas (or Timpanogos), a Numic (Ute people) word perhaps meaning "rock river", after the Timpanogos people who inhabited the region. With abundant fish from Utah Lake and the Provo River, Utah Valley was the most densely populated Ute settlement area in modern-day Utah. The valley also served as a traditional gathering place where Timpanogos, Ute, and Shoshone bands met to trade, fish, and hold religious ceremonies.

Silvestre Vélez de Escalante and Francisco Atanasio Domínguez, Spanish Franciscan missionary-explorers, led the first recorded European expedition into the area in September 1776, guided by two Timpanogos Utes whom they called Silvestre and Joaquín. Escalante chronicled this exploration across the Great Basin Desert. The Spaniards did not build a permanent settlement, though they traded with the Timpanogos, whom they called Lagunas (lake people) or Come Pescado (fish eaters).

In 1847, the Mormon pioneers arrived in the Salt Lake Valley, just north of Timpanogos Mountain. At first, relations between the settlers and local Indigenous groups were friendly, but tensions rose as settler livestock and land claims encroached on Shoshone and Ute territory. Following reports of stolen cattle by Utes in early 1849, Brigham Young gave a small militia orders "to take such measures as would put a final end to their [Indian] depredations in future." This resulted in the March 1849 Battle Creek massacre, in modern-day Pleasant Grove, Utah.

The Mormons continued expanding into Timpanogos lands. Later in March 1849, 33 Mormon families from Salt Lake City established Fort Utah. In February 1850, Brigham Young sent a territorial militia from Salt Lake City against the Timpanogos in what is known as the Provo War. Escalating conflicts with the Timpanogos subsequently contributed to the Walker War (1853–1854). On January 31, 1850, Fort Utah was renamed Provo for Étienne Provost, an early French-Canadian trapper who arrived in the region in 1825.

In 1850, the first schoolhouse was constructed in Provo, built within Fort Utah. As more Latter-day Saints arrived, Provo quickly grew as a city. It soon became known as the "Garden City" because of its extensive fruit orchards, trees, and gardens.

In 1872, the Provo Woolen Mills opened as the first large factory in Utah; it employed roughly 150 people, initially relying on skilled textile workers who had immigrated from Britain. In November 1873, the Utah Southern Railroad reached Provo, connecting the city to Salt Lake City.

The construction of the Columbia Steel Company's Ironton blast furnace plant just south of Provo in 1923–1924 marked the arrival of heavy industry in the area, though most of its pig iron was shipped to the company's steel mills in California. The plant supplied manufactured gas to Utah Valley until 1948, when Provo was connected to the interstate natural gas transmission system via a pipeline from Salt Lake City.

== Geography ==
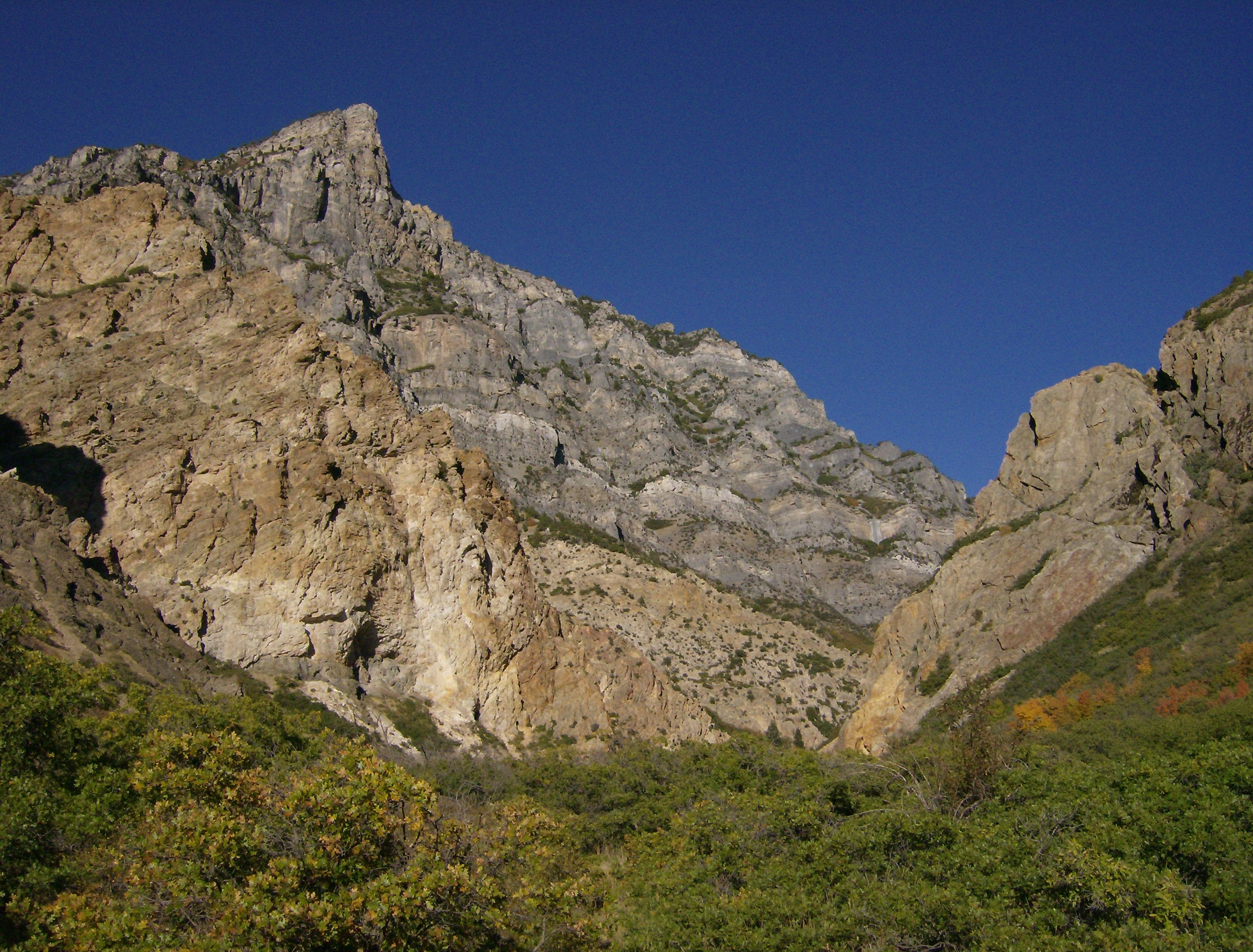
Rock Canyon in Provo

Provo lies on the eastern bank of Utah Lake in Utah Valley at an elevation of 4,549 feet (1,387 m). According to the United States Census Bureau, the city has an area of 44.2 square miles (114.4 km^{2}), of which 2.5 square miles (6.5 km^{2}), or 5.66%, are covered by water.

The Wasatch Range contains many peaks within Utah County along the east side of the Wasatch Front. One of them, known as Y Mountain, towers over the city. A large hillside letter Y made of whitewashed concrete lies halfway up the steep mountain, built in the early part of the 20th century to commemorate BYU (original plans included construction use of all three letters). Wild deer (and less frequently, cougars and moose) still roam the mountains (and occasionally the city streets). The geography allows for hiking, skiing, fishing, and other outdoor activities.

=== Climate ===
Provo's climate can be classified as either a hot-summer Mediterranean climate classification (Köppen: Csa) or as a cool, semiarid climate (Köppen: BSk). Overall, annual rainfall at the location of BYU is around 17.23 in (440 mm); however, the western part of the metropolitan area near Orem is substantially drier, receiving only around 13.5 in (340 mm) of precipitation and consequently has a cool, semiarid climate (Köppen: BSk). The wettest calendar year in Provo has been 1983 with 37.54 in (953.5 mm) and the driest 2020 with 7.28 in (184.9 mm).

Winters are cold, with substantial snowfall averaging 57.2 inches (145 cm) and a record monthly total of 66.0 inches (168 cm) in January 1918, during which the record snow cover of 34 inches (86 cm) was recorded on the 17th. Seasonal snowfall has ranged from 127.5 inches (324 cm) in 1983–84 to 10.1 inches (26 cm) in 2014–15. Very cold weather may occur when cold air from over the Continental Divide invades the region; although only four mornings fall to or below 0 °F or −17.8 °C during an average winter and this temperature was not reached at all between 1999 and 2006, during the very cold January 1917 (average temperature 14.9 °F; −9.5 °C), 17 mornings fell this cold. By contrast, in several recent winters like 1994–95, 1995–96, 1999–2000, 2004–05, and 2005–06, averages have been above freezing every month.

Temperatures warm rapidly during the spring, with the first afternoon over 70 °F (21.1 °C) on March 21, the last freeze expected on April 29, and the first temperature equal to or hotter than 90 °F (32.2 °C) on May 30. Rainfall is not infrequent during the spring; over 5.10 in (130 mm) were recorded in the Mays of 1995 and 2011, and a total of 12.29 in (312.2 mm) fell during the four-month span of March to June 2005 – in contrast to as little as 2.04 in (51.8 mm) in the same months of 2012.

Being too far north to gain any influence from the monsoon except in rare cases, such as the 4.38 in (111.3 mm) of rainfall of August 1983, Provo's summers are hot and dry, though relatively short – no maxima above 100 °F (37.8 °C) have been recorded outside the range of June 7 to August 27. Monthly maxima average over 91 °F (32.8 °C) in July and August, and precipitation averages under 1 inch per month with a 2-month total in 2016 as low as 0.06 in (1.5 mm). The hottest month on record is July 2003 with a mean of 81.8 °F (27.7 °C), and a mean maximum of 99.0 °F (37.2 °C). The hottest temperature on record is 108 °F (42.2 °C) on July 13, 2002.

The fall season has steady cooling and a transition to winter weather, with rare influences of rain systems from further south, as in the record wet month of September 1982, which had 6.53 in (165.9 mm) of total precipitation, including 4.15 in (105.4 mm) over the last 6 days from a storm moving in from Arizona. The last maximum of 90 °F (32.2 °C) can be expected around September 10, and the first morning below freezing would be on October 14.

Climate data for Provo, Utah (BYU campus), 1991–2020 normals, extremes 1916–present
Month	Jan	Feb	Mar	Apr	May	Jun	Jul	Aug	Sep	Oct	Nov	Dec	Year
Record high °F (°C)	63 (17)	73 (23)	89 (32)	89 (32)	98 (37)	105 (41)	108 (42)	107 (42)	102 (39)	91 (33)	77 (25)	72 (22)	108 (42)
Mean maximum °F (°C)	55.3 (12.9)	62.6 (17.0)	73.8 (23.2)	81.9 (27.7)	90.2 (32.3)	98.5 (36.9)	102.7 (39.3)	100.0 (37.8)	94.4 (34.7)	83.9 (28.8)	70.0 (21.1)	57.9 (14.4)	103.2 (39.6)
Mean daily maximum °F (°C)	41.0 (5.0)	47.5 (8.6)	58.3 (14.6)	65.5 (18.6)	75.5 (24.2)	87.0 (30.6)	95.0 (35.0)	92.7 (33.7)	82.9 (28.3)	68.4 (20.2)	53.0 (11.7)	41.2 (5.1)	67.3 (19.6)
Daily mean °F (°C)	32.3 (0.2)	37.4 (3.0)	46.3 (7.9)	52.5 (11.4)	61.4 (16.3)	70.9 (21.6)	78.6 (25.9)	76.7 (24.8)	67.3 (19.6)	54.5 (12.5)	42.2 (5.7)	32.7 (0.4)	54.4 (12.4)
Mean daily minimum °F (°C)	23.5 (−4.7)	27.2 (−2.7)	34.3 (1.3)	39.5 (4.2)	47.2 (8.4)	54.7 (12.6)	62.1 (16.7)	60.8 (16.0)	51.8 (11.0)	40.7 (4.8)	31.4 (−0.3)	24.2 (−4.3)	41.5 (5.3)
Mean minimum °F (°C)	8.4 (−13.1)	13.4 (−10.3)	22.0 (−5.6)	28.1 (−2.2)	34.8 (1.6)	42.7 (5.9)	53.4 (11.9)	52.2 (11.2)	39.7 (4.3)	28.0 (−2.2)	17.2 (−8.2)	9.8 (−12.3)	5.4 (−14.8)
Record low °F (°C)	−20 (−29)	−20 (−29)	0 (−18)	12 (−11)	27 (−3)	29 (−2)	35 (2)	39 (4)	21 (−6)	11 (−12)	3 (−16)	−30 (−34)	−30 (−34)
Average precipitation inches (mm)	1.95 (50)	1.56 (40)	1.55 (39)	1.92 (49)	2.01 (51)	0.93 (24)	0.51 (13)	0.73 (19)	1.24 (31)	1.59 (40)	1.39 (35)	1.81 (46)	17.19 (437)
Average snowfall inches (cm)	12.5 (32)	8.7 (22)	4.0 (10)	3.1 (7.9)	0.2 (0.51)	0.0 (0.0)	0.0 (0.0)	0.0 (0.0)	0.0 (0.0)	0.6 (1.5)	4.6 (12)	11.2 (28)	44.9 (113.91)
Average precipitation days (≥ 0.01 in)	9.9	9.5	8.8	9.7	9.2	5.4	4.5	5.4	6.1	6.8	8.0	9.3	92.6
Average snowy days (≥ 0.1 in)	5.6	4.2	2.5	1.5	0.1	0.0	0.0	0.0	0.0	0.3	2.7	5.7	22.6
Percentage possible sunshine	50	55	67	69	71	80	73	79	83	73	50	56	67
Average ultraviolet index	2	3	5	7	9	10	10	9	7	4	3	2	6
Source 1: NOAA
Source 2: Weather Atlas

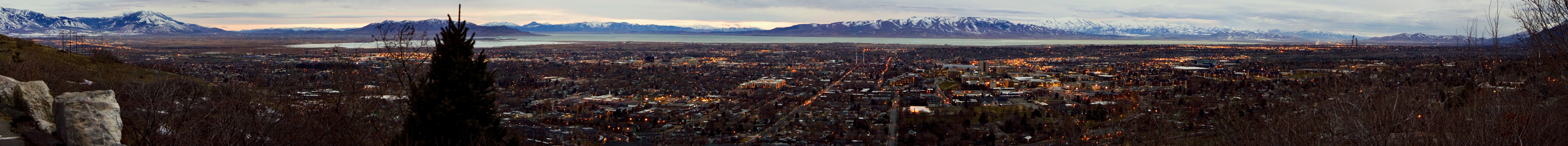
A panoramic view of Provo after sunset, in February 2014

== Demographics ==
According to U.S. Census Bureau estimates, Provo had a population of 114,527 in 2025. Between 2020 and 2024, the city's population was 70.8% non-Hispanic White and 19.2% Hispanic or Latino, with 45.2% of residents aged 25 and older holding a bachelor's degree or higher.

Provo's demographic profile differs significantly from the national average. WalletHub conducted a study in 2015 that weighed race, housing, income, and education, and their findings ranked the Provo-Orem metropolitan area 376 out of 381 large U.S. metro areas in terms of resemblance to the country.

Historical population
Census	Pop.	Note	%±
1860	2,030		—
1870	2,384		17.4%
1880	3,432		44.0%
1890	5,159		50.3%
1900	6,185		19.9%
1910	8,925		44.3%
1920	10,303		15.4%
1930	14,766		43.3%
1940	18,071		22.4%
1950	28,937		60.1%
1960	36,047		24.6%
1970	53,131		47.4%
1980	74,108		39.5%
1990	86,835		17.2%
2000	105,166		21.1%
2010	112,488		7.0%
2020	115,162		2.4%
U.S. Decennial Census

=== Racial and ethnic composition ===
Provo, Utah – racial and ethnic composition Note: the US Census treats Hispanic/Latino as an ethnic category. This table excludes Latinos from the racial categories and assigns them to a separate category. Hispanics/Latinos may be of any race.
Race / ethnicity (NH = Non-Hispanic)	Pop 2000	Pop 2010	Pop 2020	% 2000	% 2010	% 2020
White alone (NH)	88,311	87,186	81,655	83.97%	77.51%	70.90%
Black or African American alone (NH)	432	672	971	0.41%	0.60%	0.84%
Native American or Alaska Native alone (NH)	703	719	590	0.67%	0.64%	0.51%
Asian alone (NH)	1,903	2,743	2,772	1.81%	2.44%	2.41%
Native Hawaiian or Pacific Islander alone (NH)	873	1,229	1,655	0.83%	1.09%	1.44%
Other race alone (NH)	141	194	406	0.13%	0.17%	0.35%
Multiracial (NH)	1,790	2,654	5,718	1.70%	2.36%	4.97%
Hispanic or Latino (any race)	11,013	17,091	21,395	10.47%	15.19%	18.58%
Total	105,166	112,488	115,162	100.00%	100.00%	100.00%

=== Census data ===
==== 2020 census ====
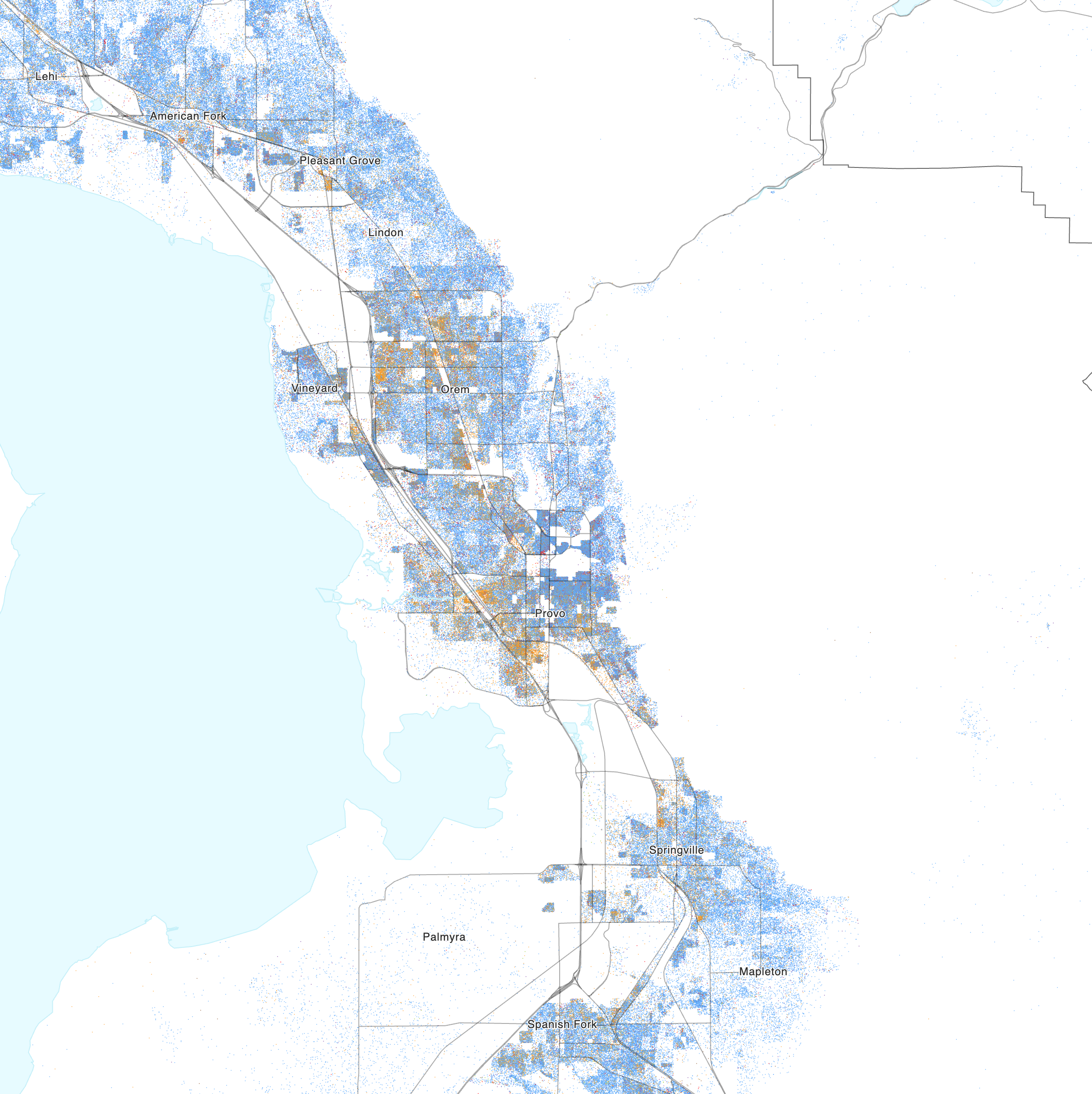
Map of racial distribution in Provo, 2020 U.S. census. Each dot is one person: ⬤ White ⬤ Black ⬤ Asian ⬤ Hispanic ⬤ Multiracial ⬤ Native American/other

As of the 2020 census, Provo had a population of 115,162. The median age was 23.8 years; 21.6% of the residents were under 18 and 7.1% were 65 or older. For every 100 females, there were 97.8 males, and for every 100 females 18 and over, there were 95.6 males.

Almost all of the residents lived in urban areas, while 0.6% lived in rural areas.

Of the 34,067 households in Provo, 31.9% had children under 18 living in them, 54.1% were married-couple households, 18.9% were households with a male householder and no spouse or partner present, and 24.7% were households with a female householder and no spouse or partner present. About 16.3% of all households were made up of individuals, and 4.9% had someone living alone who was 65 or older.

The city had 36,106 housing units, of which 5.6% were vacant. The homeowner vacancy rate was 1.1% and the rental vacancy rate was 4.3%.

Racial composition as of the 2020 census
Race	Number	Percentage
White	85,955	74.6%
Black or African American	1,072	0.9%
American Indian and Alaska Native	1,168	1.0%
Asian	2,844	2.5%
Native Hawaiian and other Pacific Islander	1,695	1.5%
Some other race	9,433	8.2%
Two or more races	12,995	11.3%

==== 2010 census ====
At the 2010 census, 112,488 people, 31,524 households, and 21,166 families resided in the city. The population density was 2,697.6 inhabitants per square mile (1,041.5/km^{2}). The racial makeup of the city was 84.8% White, 0.7% Black or African American, 0.8% American Indian, 2.5% Asian, 1.1% Pacific Islander, 6.6% from other races, and 3.4% from two or more races. Hispanics or Latinos of any race were 15.2% of the population.

Of the 31,524 households, 34.8% had children under 18 living with them, 55.4% were married couples living together, 8.2% had a female householder with no husband present, and 32.9% were not families. About 12.8% of all households were made up of individuals, and 4.7% had someone living alone who was 65 or older. The average household size was 3.24, and the average family size was 3.41.

In the city, the age distribution was 22.3% under 18, 36.4% from 18 to 24, 24.8% from 25 to 44, 10.5% from 45 to 64, and 5.8% were 65 or older. The median age was 23.3 years. For every 100 females, there were 98.2 males. For every 100 females 18 and over, there were 96.4 males.

==== 2000 census ====
At the 2000 census, 105,166 people, 29,192 households, and 19,938 families resided in the city. The population density was 2,653.2 inhabitants per square mile (1,024.4/km^{2}). The 30,374 housing units had an average density of 766.3/sq mi (295.9/km^{2}). The racial makeup of the city was 88.52% White, 0.46% Black or African American, 0.80% American Indian, 1.83% Asian, 0.84% Pacific Islander, 5.10% from other races, and 2.44% from two or more races. Hispanic or Latino residents of any race were 10.47% of the population.

Of the 29,192 households, 33.8% had children under 18 living with them, 57.0% were married couples living together, 7.8% had a female householder with no husband present, and 31.7% were not families; 11.8% were made up of a single individual, and 4.6% had someone living alone who was 65 or older. The average household size was 3.34, and the average family size was 3.40.

In the city, 22.3% of residents were under 18, 40.2% from 18 to 24, 23.2% from 25 to 44, 8.6% from 45 to 64, and 5.7% were 65 years of age or older. The median age was 23 years. For every 100 females, there were 92.6 males. For every 100 females 18 and over, there were 89.3 males.

The median household income was $34,313, and the median family income was $36,393. Males had a median income of $32,010 and females $20,928. The per capita income was $13,207. About 12.5% of families and 26.8% of the population were below the poverty line, including 14.4% of those under 18 and 4.3% of those 65 or over.

=== Religion ===
Religion in Provo, Utah (2010)
Religion
LDS	88.7%
Catholic	1.3%
Protestant	0.6%
Other	0.3%
None	9.1%

The residents of Provo are predominantly members of the LDS Church. According to data taken in 2000 by the ARDA, 88% of the overall population, and 98% of religious adherents in the Provo-Orem area are Latter-day Saints. According to the breakdown for Utah County in 2010, most people (90.6%) were Christian, with Latter-day Saints constituting 88.7% of the population. Catholics constituted 1.3% and Protestants constituted 0.6%. Other religions constituted 0.3% of the population. 9.1% of the population did not adhere to any religion.

== Economy ==
=== Local companies ===
Provo has more than 100 restaurants (with over 60 in the downtown area) and a couple of shopping centers. The Shops At Riverwoods and Provo Towne Centre, both shopping malls, operate in Provo. Several small shops, music venues, and boutiques have popped up downtown, along Center Street and University Avenue. Downtown has also begun to host "gallery strolls" every first Friday of the month that features local artists. There are many dining establishments in and around downtown Provo.

Five Provo companies are listed on Inc.com's Inc. 5000 list of the fastest-growing private companies in the United States. The largest, DieCuts With a View, is ranked number 1403 and has revenues of $26.2 million. Other companies on the list are VitalSmarts (ranked 4109, with $41.4 million in revenue), and Connect Public Relations (ranked 3694, with $6.1 million in revenue). The global recreation and entertainment company Ryze Trampoline Parks, with locations throughout Asia, Europe and the U.S., is headquartered in Provo.

Novell, the dominant personal computer networking company from the mid-1980s through the mid-1990s, was headquartered in Provo and occupied several buildings at the height of its success. It was eventually acquired by The Attachmate Group and then by Micro Focus, which still maintains facilities there.

The Food and Care Coalition is a local organization providing services to the homeless and low-income citizens of Provo and Utah County. It also provides volunteer opportunities.

=== International companies ===
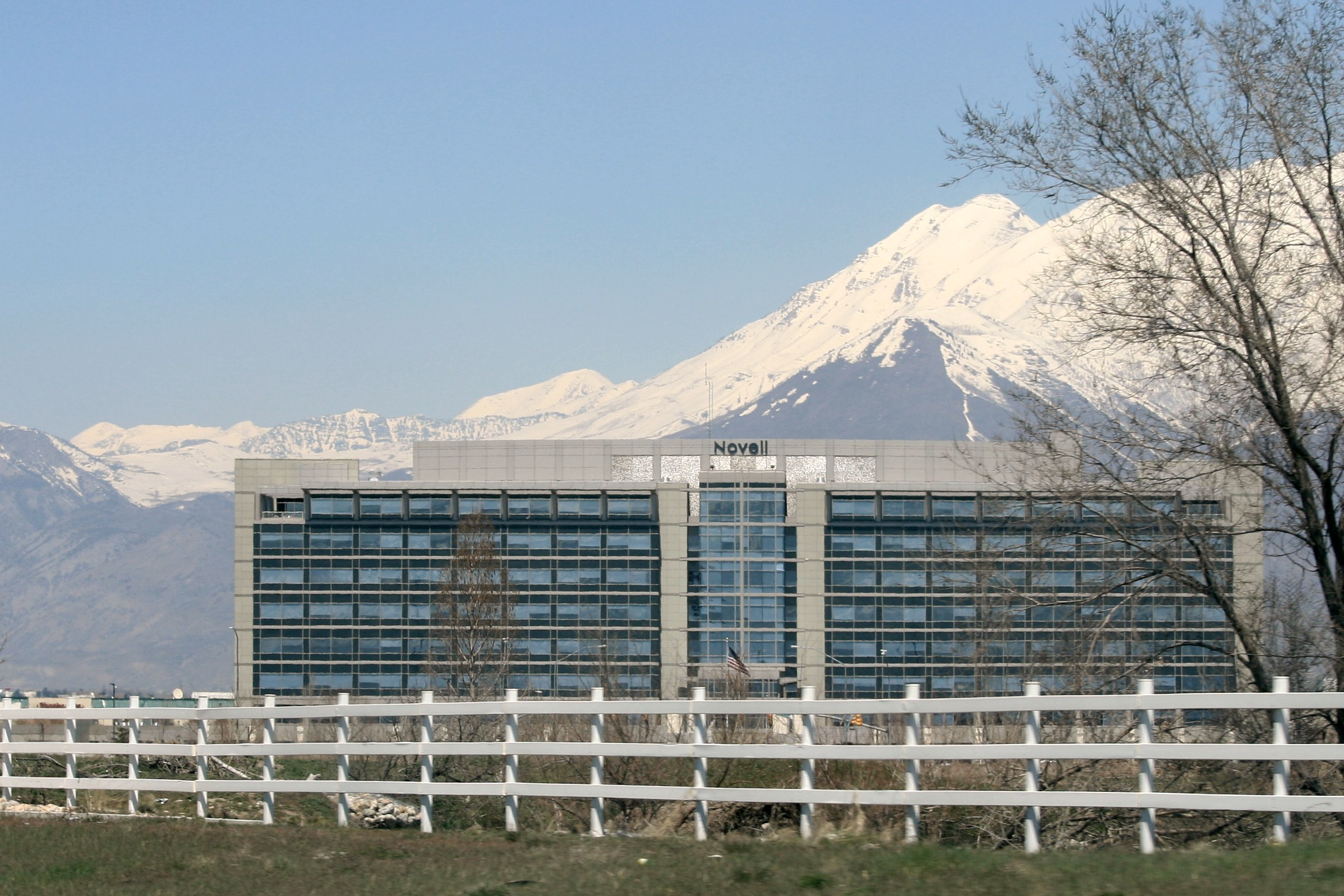
Novell headquarters

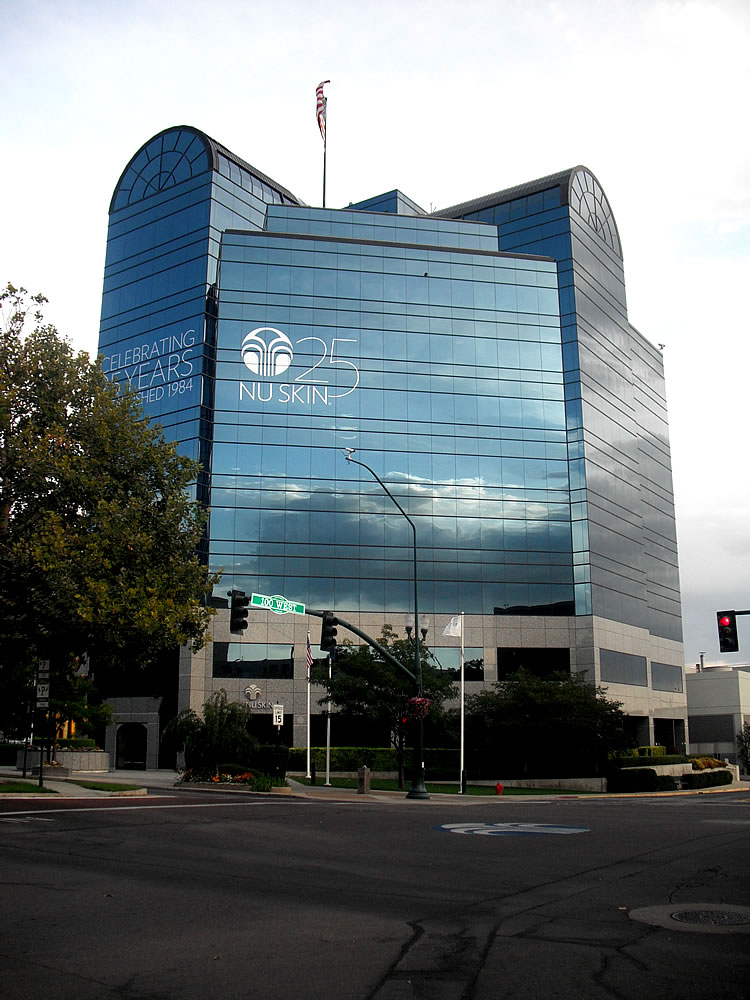
Nu Skin headquarters

- Action Target, a shooting range manufacturer
- Morinda Bioactives (formerly Tahitian Noni International), a multi-level marketing health and skin care manufacturer whose products are based on the Tahitian fruit called noni
- North American Arms, a firearms manufacturer
- Nu Skin Enterprises, a multi-level marketing firm for skin care products founded in 1984
- Qualtrics, a private research software company
- Vivint (formerly APX Alarm Security Solutions), a residential security company

=== Top employers ===
According to Provo's 2019 Comprehensive Annual Financial Report, the top employers in the city were:

#	Employer	# of employees
1	Brigham Young University	5,000-6,999
2	Utah Valley Regional Medical Center	3,000-3,999
3	Vivint	3,000-3,999
4	Arm Security	1,000-1,999
5	Revere Health	1,000-1,999
6	Chrysalis Utah	1,000-1,999
7	Qualtrics	1,000-1,999
8	RBD Acquisition	1,000-1,999
9	Frontier Communications	500-999
10	Nu Skin International	500-999

== Arts and culture ==
=== Annual cultural events ===
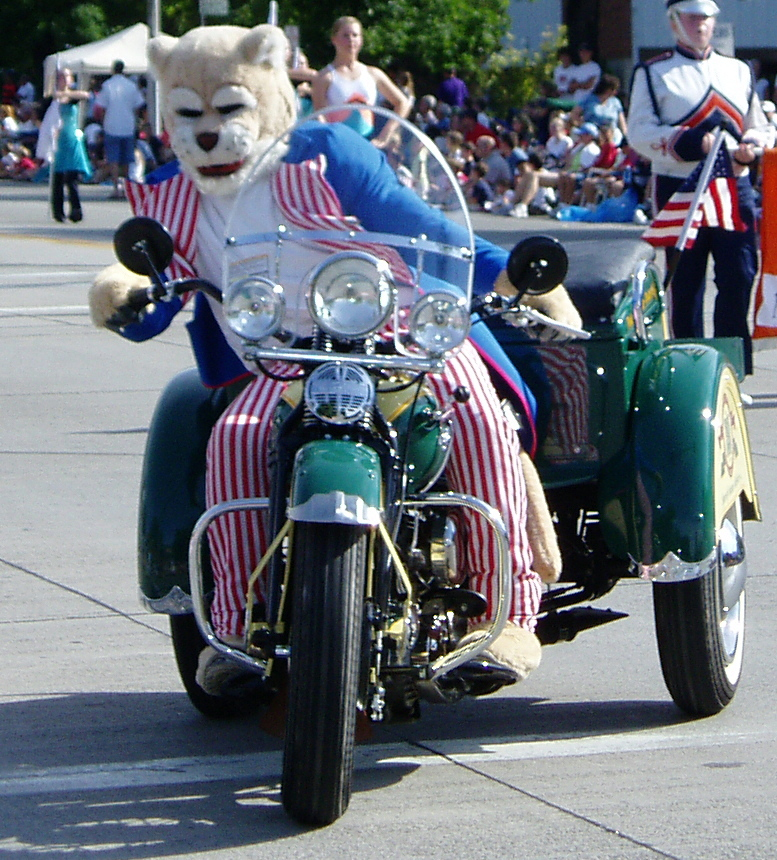
Cosmo the Cougar at America's Freedom Festival at Provo

Every July, Provo hosts America's Freedom Festival at Provo which includes the Stadium of Fire at BYU. It is held in LaVell Edwards Stadium, home to BYU's NCAA football team. The Independence Day festivities are popular among residents and have featured such notable figures as Bob Hope, David Hasselhoff, Reba McEntire, Kelly Clarkson, Mandy Moore, Huey Lewis and the News, Toby Keith, Sean Hannity, Glenn Beck, Fred Willard, and Taylor Hicks. In 2015, the event included performances by Journey and Olivia Holt, and was hosted by television personality Montel Williams.

Provo has two other large festivals each fall. Festival Latinoamericano is an annual family-oriented Labor Day weekend event in downtown Provo that offers the community a taste of the region's Hispanic culture through ethnic food, vendors, and performances.

The city has hosted an annual LGBT Provo Pride Festival since 2013.

In 2023, Provo's historic courthouse hosted Utah County's first public Hanukkah menorah lighting, led by BYU quarterback Jake Retzlaff.

=== Points of interest ===
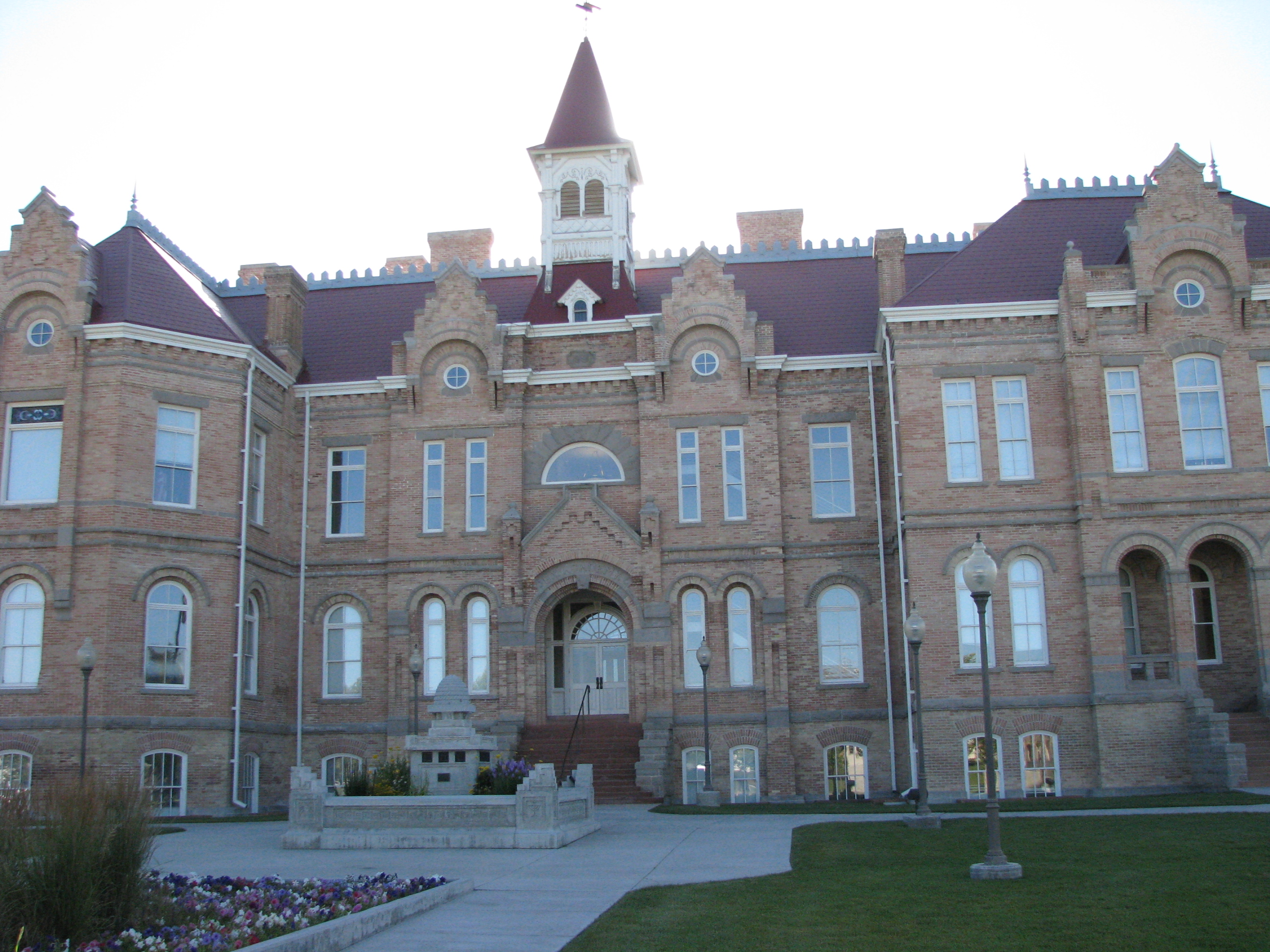
Provo City Library in the former Brigham Young Academy

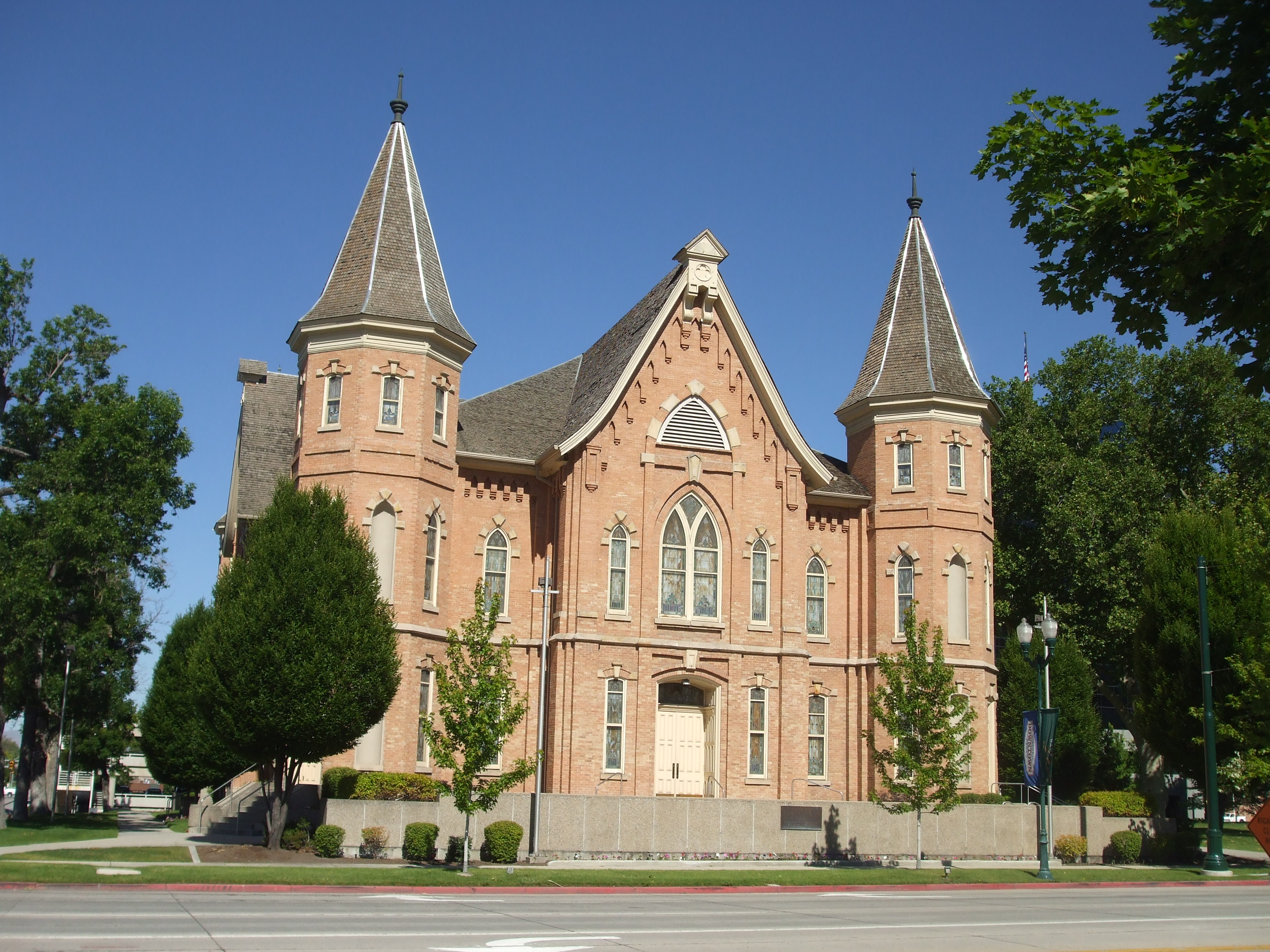
The Provo Tabernacle before destruction by fire in 2010. It was later renovated into Provo City Center Temple.

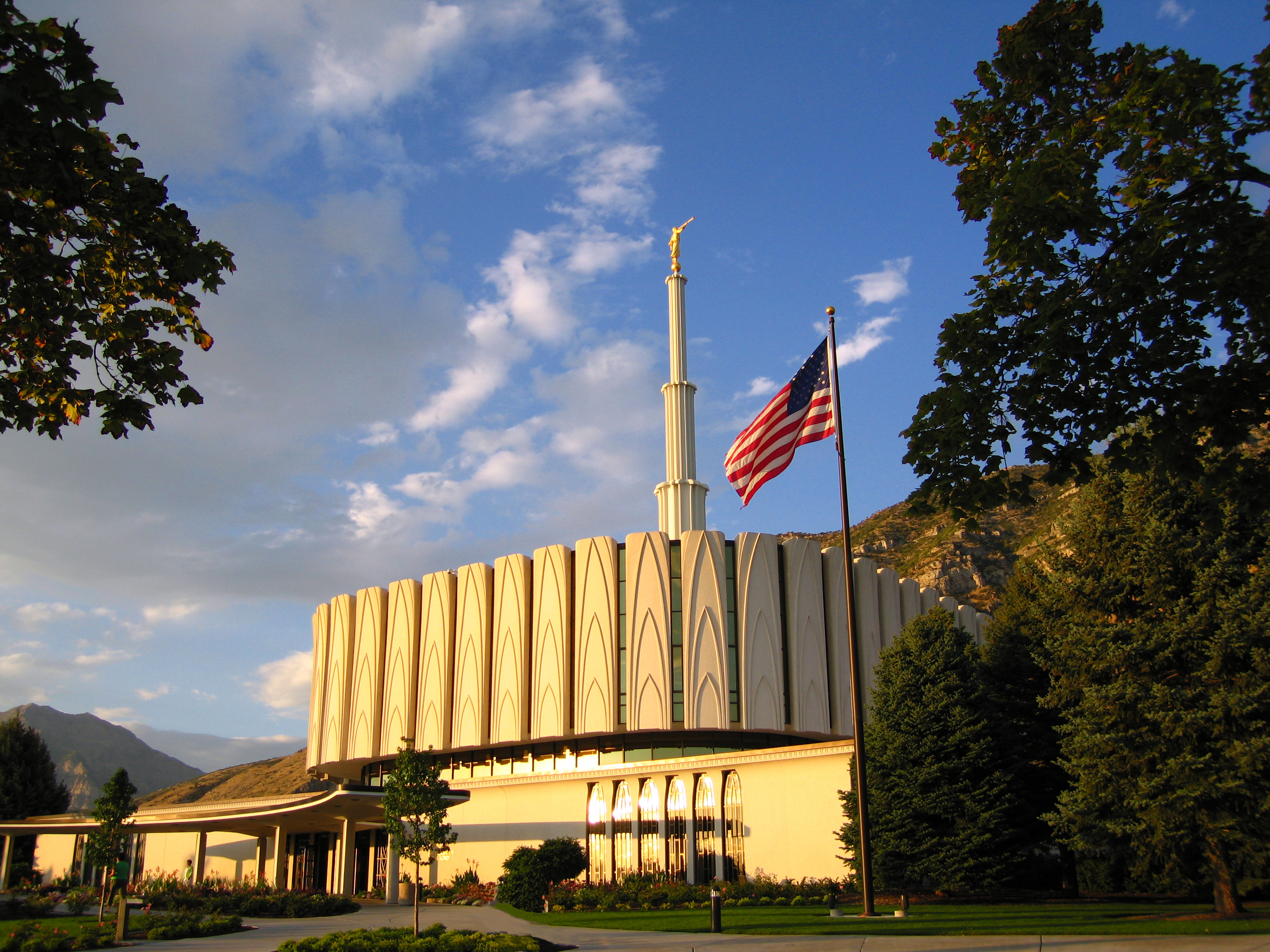
The Provo Utah Temple

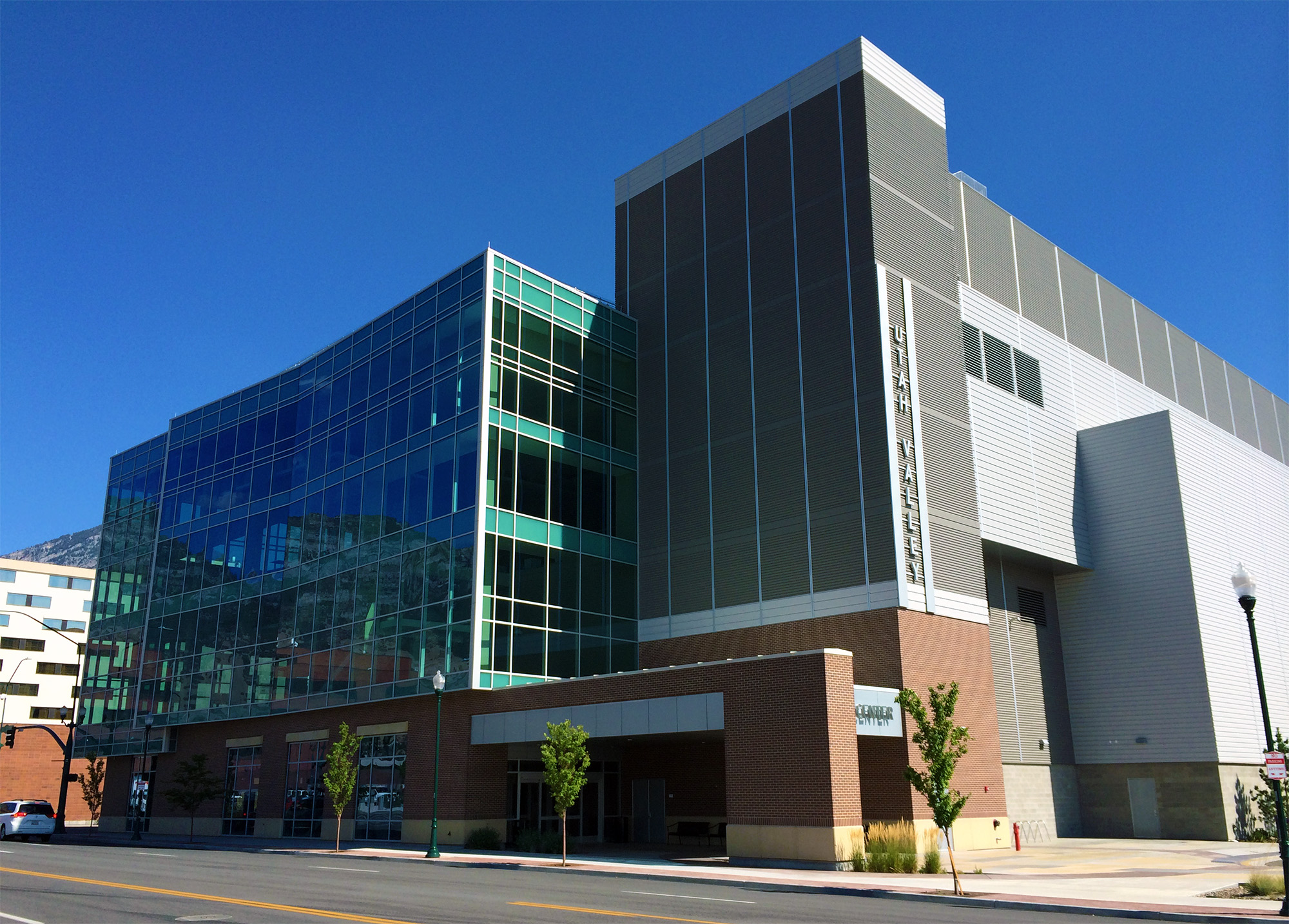
The Utah Valley Convention Center

==== Covey Center for the Arts ====
The Covey Center for the Arts, a performing arts center, is at 425 West Center Street. It features plays, ballets, art showcases, and musical performances throughout the year. The size of the building is a total of 42,000 square feet (3,902 m^{2}). The main performance hall seats 670 people. Three dance studios are furnished with a piano, ballet bars, and mirrors. Another theater, the Brinton Black Box Theater, seats 60 for smaller, more intimate events. There are also two art galleries: the 1,620-square-foot (151 m^{2}) Secured Gallery and the Eccles Gallery in the lower lobby.

==== LDS Church MTC ====
Provo is the location of the church's largest MTC. Each week approximately 475 missionaries enter for 3–9 weeks of training before they depart for the mission field, becoming part of more than 58,000 in more than 120 countries. About 1,100 instructors (many of them returned missionaries) teach 62 languages. The MTC in Provo began construction in July 1974 and was completed in July 1976. The MTC was expanded in the early 1990s to become the largest of the 17 such centers than in the world. Additional construction was completed in 2017.

==== Provo City Library at Academy Square ====
The Provo City Library is a public library that occupies the building of the former Brigham Young Academy, built-in 1892. The building was added to the National Register of Historic Places in 1976. Its collection contains over 277,000 media. The library is on University Avenue and 550 North.

==== Provo Recreation Center ====
With construction finished in 2013, the center provides a location for aquatic and gym recreation next to the Provo Power plant.

==== Provo Utah Temple ====
The Provo Utah Temple is at the base of Rock Canyon in Provo. This temple has been among the busiest in the LDS Church due to its proximity to BYU and the MTC. The temple closed in February 2024, has been razed, and is currently being reconstructed. The temple, estimated for completion in 2027, will reopen as the Provo Utah Rock Canyon Temple.

==== Provo City Center Temple ====
Located at the corner of University Avenue and Center Street, the Provo City Center Temple serves as another temple for the Provo area's Latter-day Saint population. After a fire in 2010 destroyed the Provo Tabernacle, Thomas S. Monson, then LDS Church president, announced the site would become the city's second temple. Renovations were finished and the temple was dedicated in March 2016.

==== Utah Valley Convention Center ====
The Utah Valley Convention Center opened in 2012. It has 83,578 square feet (7,764.7 m^{2}) of combined meeting, pre-function and garden space.

==== Other points of interest ====
- Brigham Young University Arboretum
- BYU Museum of Paleontology
- LaVell Edwards Stadium, home of the NCAA college football BYU Cougars as well as Stadium of Fire, an annual 4th of July fireworks show and concert
- The Marriott Center, home of the NCAA college basketball BYU Cougars. The Marriott Center is also used for large university gatherings, such as devotionals, guest lectures, and graduation ceremonies
- Peaks Ice Arena, hockey venue for the 2002 Winter Olympic Games
- The Provo River, known for fishing, and the Provo River Parkway, a paved bicycle and walking trail adjacent to the river
- Reed O. Smoot House, a National Historic Landmark, at 183 East 100 South
- Seven Peaks Water Park, the largest water park in Utah.
- The Shops At Riverwoods, a center of residences, retail, and entertainment at the mouth of Provo Canyon
- Timpanogos Cave National Monument
- Uinta-Wasatch-Cache National Forest, a national forest on the Wasatch Front bordering the east edge of Provo and Utah Valley
- Utah Lake, a fresh-water lake popular for fishing, boating, and other recreational activities

== Government ==
Federally, Provo is part of Utah's 3rd congressional district, represented by Republican Mike Kennedy, elected in 2024.

=== City administration ===
Elected officials of Provo City as of 2024
Official	Position	Term
Marsha Judkins	Mayor	2026-2030
City council members
Katrice Mackay	City Wide I	2022-2026
Gary Garrett	City Wide II	2024-2028
Craig Christensen	District 1	2024-2028
George Handley	District 2	2022-2026
Becky Bogdin	District 3	2024-2028
Travis Hoban	District 4	2024-2028
Rachel Whipple	District 5	2022-2026

Provo is administered by a seven-member city council and a mayor. Five of the council seats are elected by individual city districts, and two of the seats are elected by the city as a whole. These elected officials serve four-year terms, with elections alternating every two years. Provo has a Mayor–council government, which creates two separate but equal branches of government. The mayor is chief executive of the city and the council is the legislative and policy-making body of the city. The mayor is Marsha Judkins, who has been in office since January 5, 2026.

== Education ==
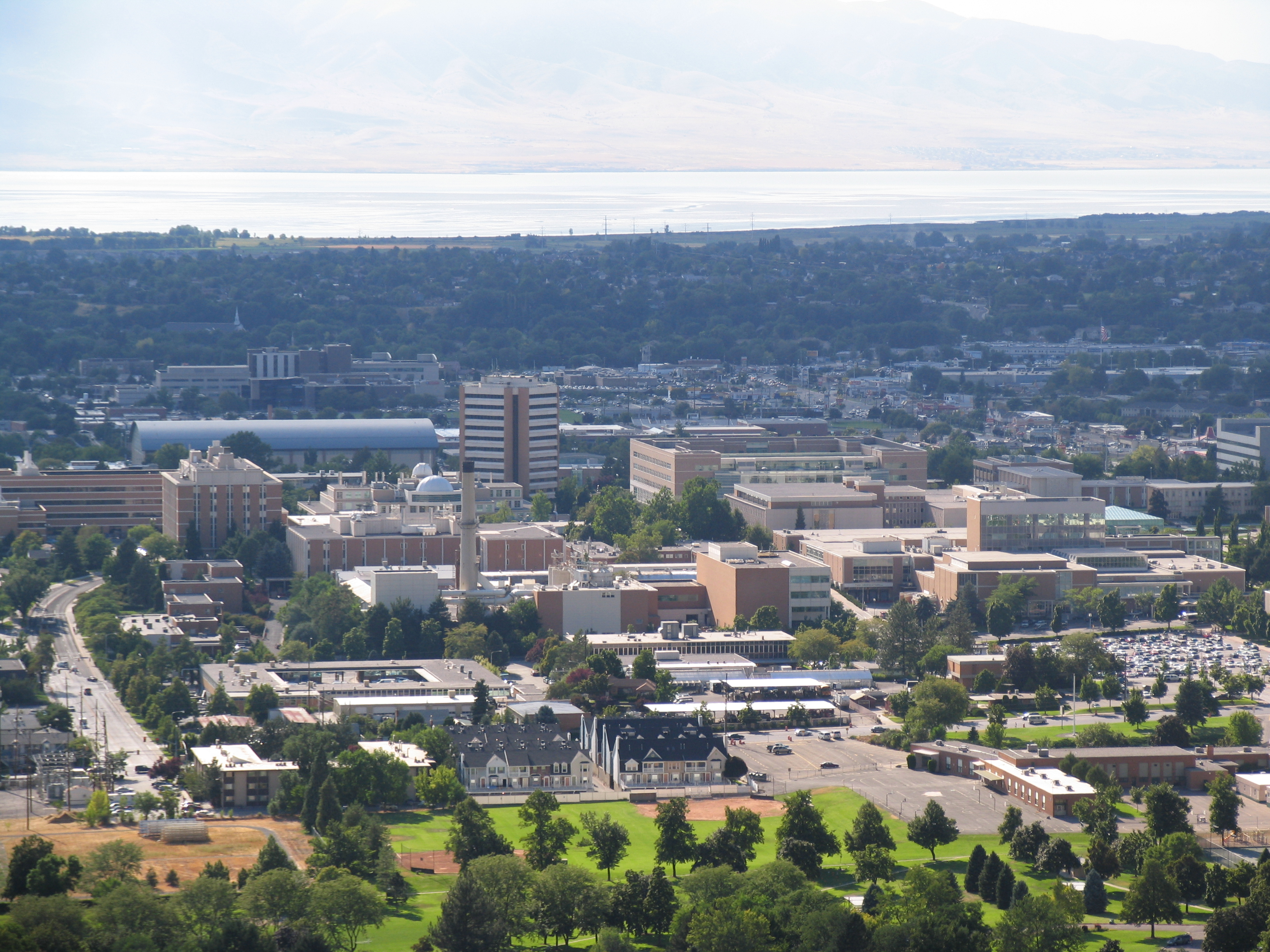
Brigham Young University taken from the east of the campus

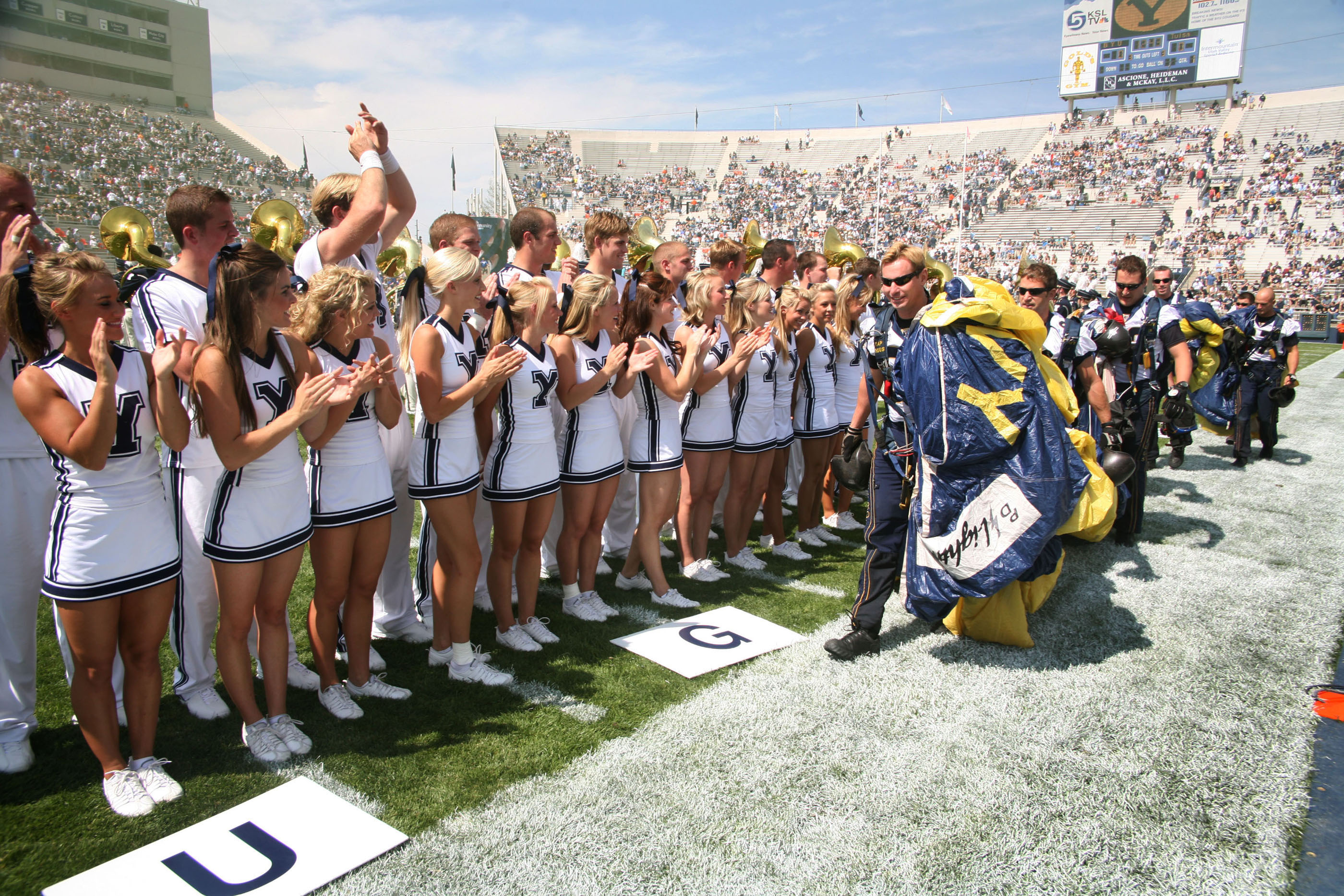
Pre-game entertainment parachuters at LaVell Edwards Stadium

=== Higher education ===
BYU is a private university operated by the LDS Church. BYU is the largest private religious university in the United States, with more than 30,000 students. It is the flagship of the Church Educational System. On the campus is the Spencer W. Kimball Tower, the tallest building in Provo.

Rocky Mountain University of Health Professions is a private, for-profit university emphasizing graduate healthcare education. The Northwest Commission accredits the university of Colleges and Universities (NWCCU). RMUoHP offers programs in nursing practice, physical therapy, occupational therapy, and health science. RMUoHP will be building Utah County's first new medical school.

Provo College is a private, for-profit educational institution specializing in career education. The school is accredited by the Accrediting Council for Independent Colleges and Schools (ACICS). Provo College offers associate degrees and diplomas in fields such as nursing, medical assisting, criminal justice, graphic design, and office administration.

=== Primary and secondary education ===
Almost all of Provo is within the Provo School District. The school board has seven members, each representing a different district of the city. There are thirteen elementary schools, two middle schools, and three high schools. Provo High School was the first school in Utah County to be an IB World school. The school has a record of 4A state basketball championships, more state champions than any other school in the state. Timpview High School has a record of 4A state football championships.

A small section of the city lies within Alpine School District.

== Infrastructure ==
=== Transportation ===
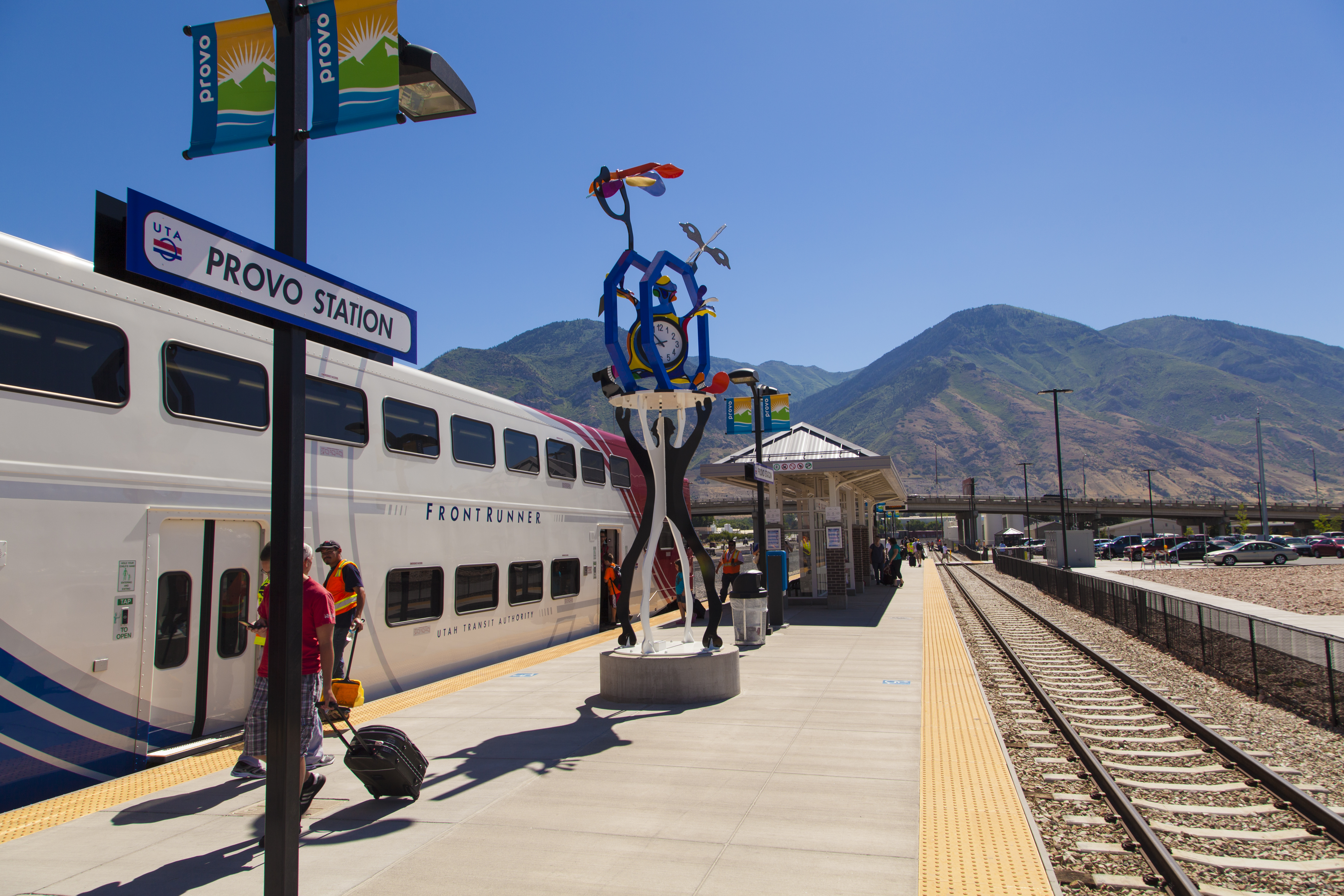
The FrontRunner at Utah Transit Authority's Provo station, July 2013

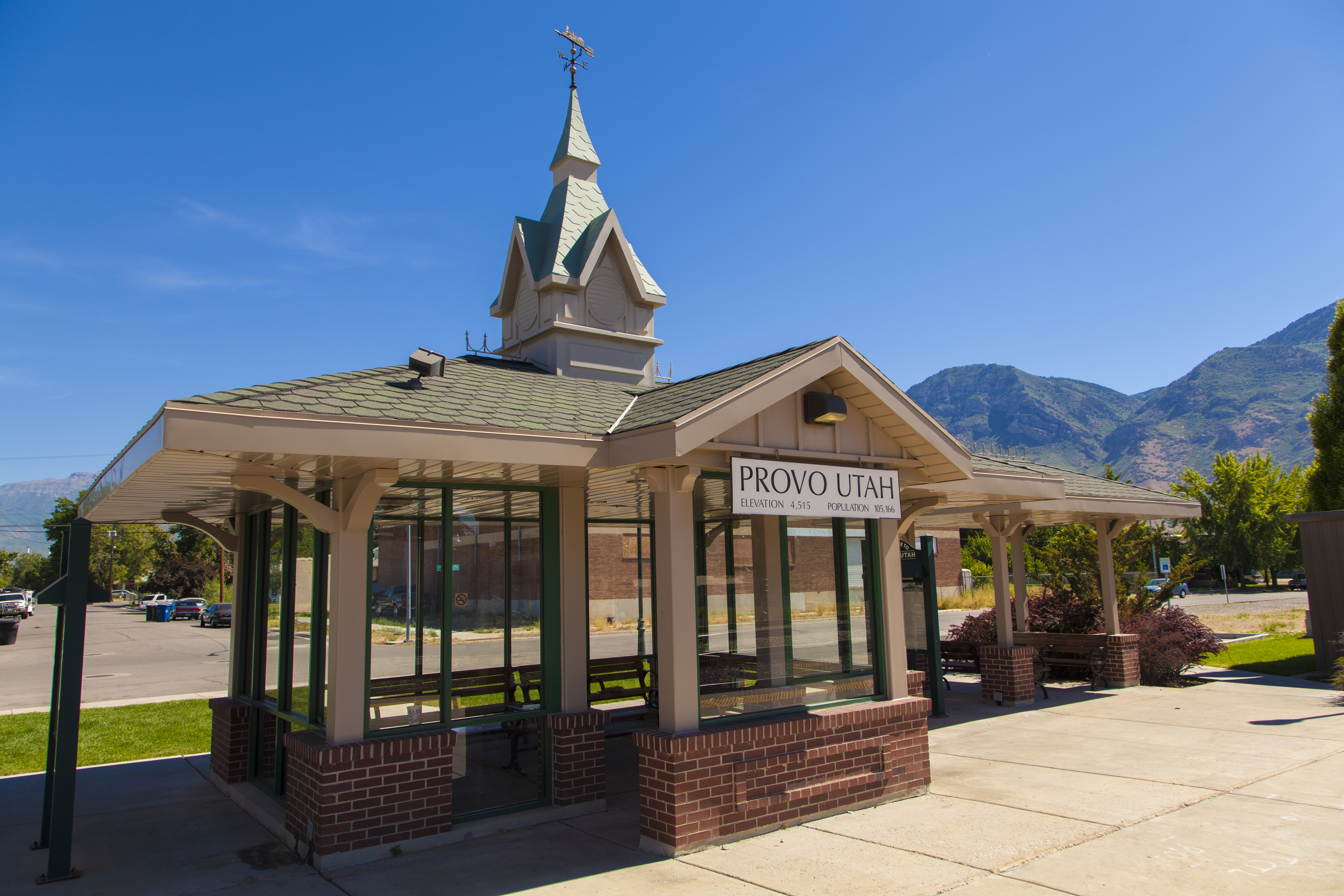
Amtrak's Provo station, July 2013

Interstate 15 runs through western Provo, connecting it with the rest of the Wasatch Front and much of Utah. US-89 runs northwest to southeast through the city as State Street, while US-189 connects US-89 with I-15, BYU, and Orem to the north. At the north edge of the city, US-189 heads northeast into Provo Canyon, where it connects with Heber.

Amtrak, the national passenger rail system, provides service to Provo station, operating its California Zephyr daily in both directions between Chicago, Illinois, and Emeryville, California (in the San Francisco Bay Area). Provo also can be accessed by Salt Lake Express intercity buses and the extensive Utah Transit Authority (UTA) bus system. UTA's commuter rail service, the FrontRunner, opened an extension to Provo from Salt Lake City on December 10, 2012. The Provo Intermodal Center, near the Amtrak station, connects the FrontRunner with local bus routes, as well as Greyhound service.

The Provo Municipal Airport is Utah's second busiest airport regarding the number of aircraft take-offs and landings. Allegiant Airlines has been based out of the airport since 2022.

== Notable people ==
Provo is home to (or the hometown of) many well-known people, including The Osmonds (including Donny, Marie, and the Osmond Brothers), LDS Church president Dallin H. Oaks, and NFL and BYU quarterback Steve Young. Goodwin Knight, who served as the 35th Governor of California (1947–1953), was born in Provo. The global economist Dambisa Moyo moved to Provo following her marriage to Qualtrics co-founder Jared Smith.

== Sister cities ==
Provo's sister cities are:

- Nanning, China
- Chengdu, China
- Huế, Vietnam
- Meissen, Germany

== See also ==
- List of cities and towns in Utah
