= The Shops at Riverwoods =

Shopping center in Provo, Utah, United States

Coordinates: 40°17′56″N 111°39′28″W

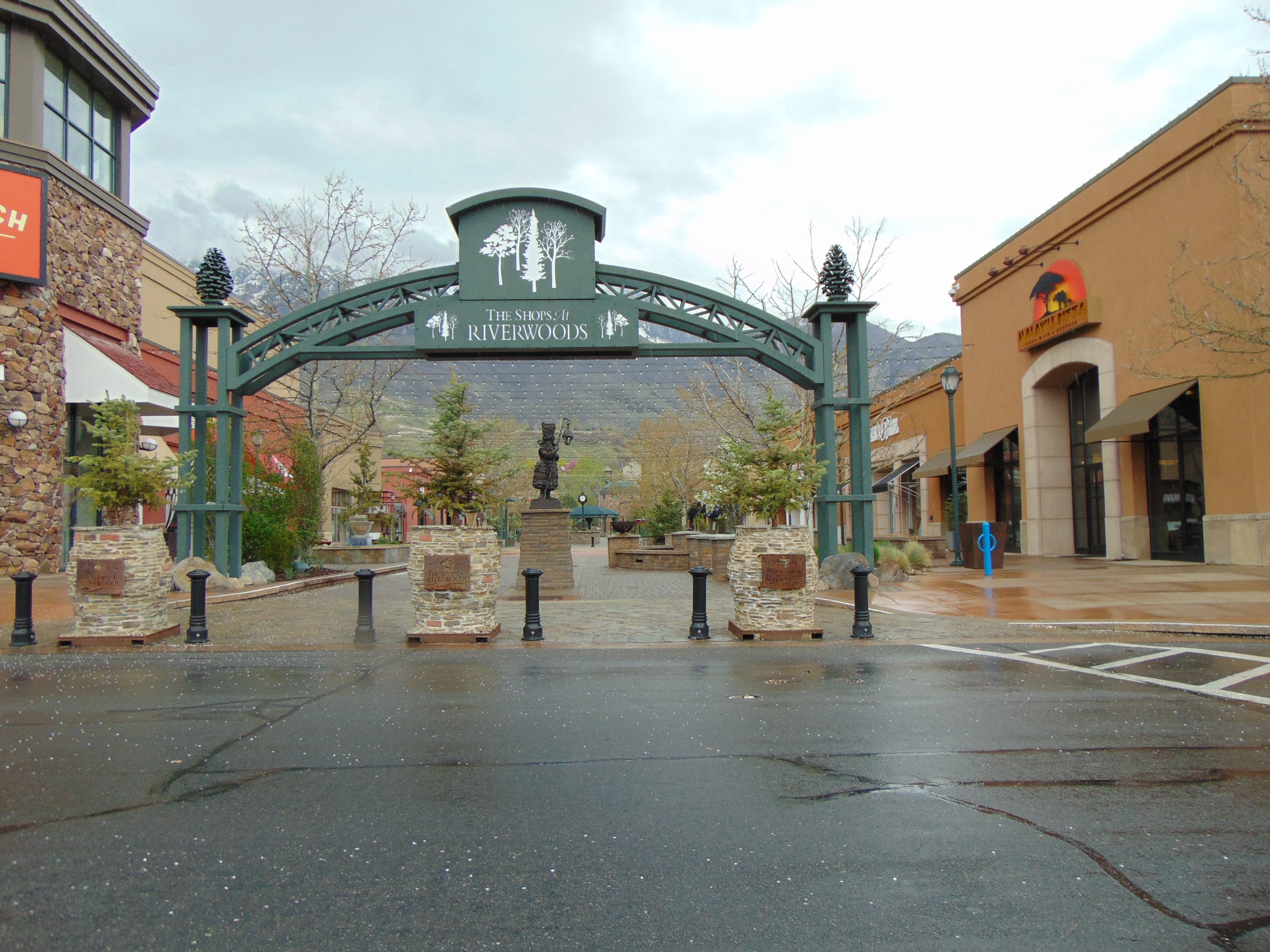
The shops at Riverwoods

The Shops At Riverwoods is located at 4801 North University Ave. (US Highway 189) in Provo, Utah at the base of the Wasatch Mountains near the entrance to Provo Canyon. The Shops at Riverwoods is at the center of the Riverwoods Community, a 120-acre (0.49 km^{2}) village containing 186,667 square feet (17,341.9 m^{2}) of retail space, 143 residences, retail, restaurants, and entertainment venues. The Shops opened 8 August 1998 with a number of national retailers who have since left: Eddie Bauer, Copeland Sports, Gap, Banana Republic, Abercrombie & Fitch Co., and Ann Taylor. The shops went into foreclosure and were bought in 2009 by Tigriswoods, LLC. The Shops hosts both local and national retailers.

The development is set in a riverfront environment designed to be community-centered. The Shops At Riverwoods have received various awards including: The Reed Smoot Beautification Award in 2006, The Grand Invision Utah Award in 2001, and The National Concrete Award in 1998.

The property was designed by San Francisco–based Field Paoli Architects, which was awarded the 2001 Superior Achievement in Design & Imaging (SADI) for its design work on the project in the category of New or Renovated Open Centers. The Shops also feature sculptures by James C. Christensen.
