= Mat and Savanna Shaw =

American musical duo

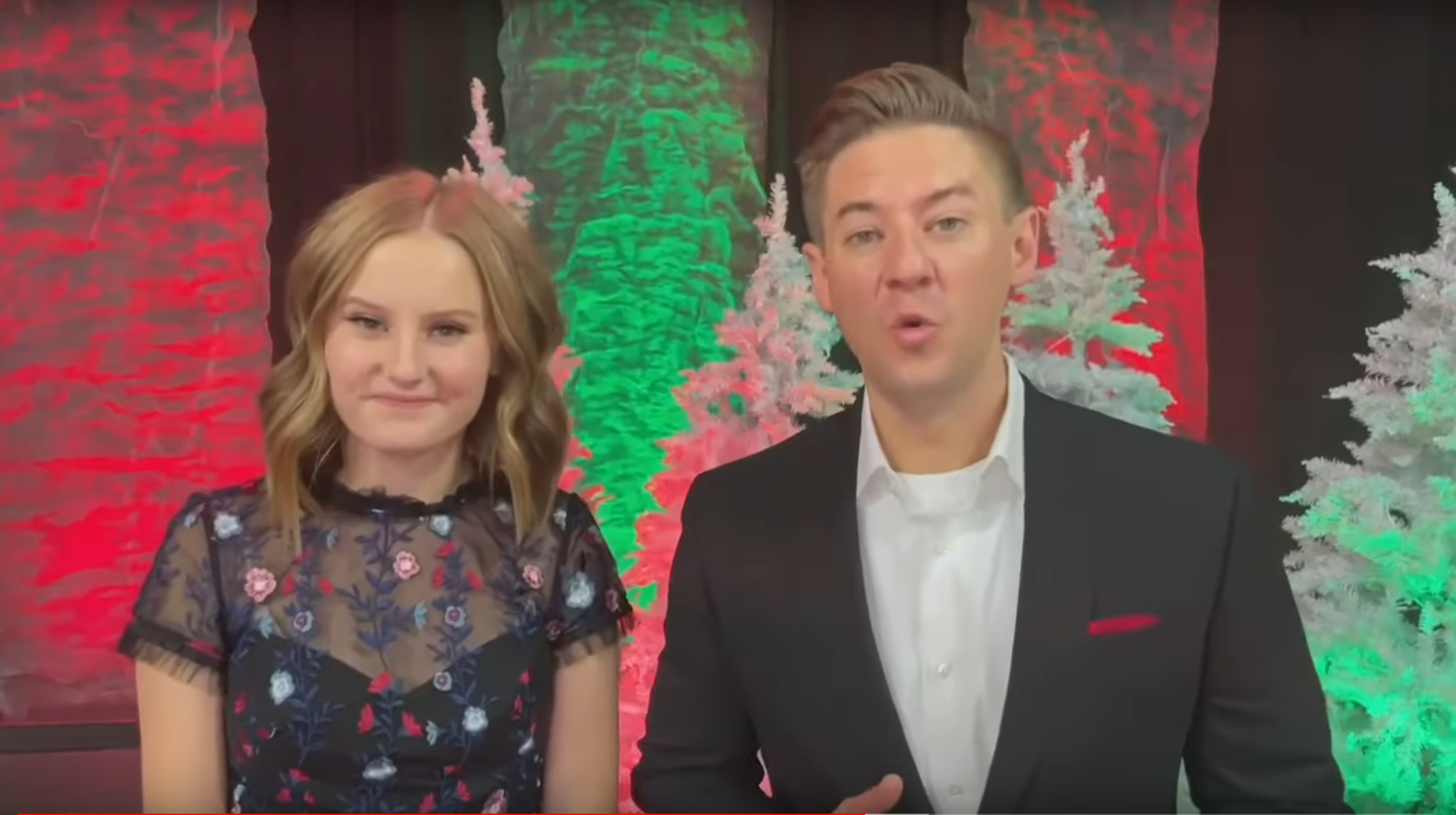
- Savanna and Mat Shaw performed in a livestream Christmas concert hosted by the United States Army Field Band in 2020
- Born: Mat Shaw Savanna Shaw; August 4, 2004 (age 21)
- Occupation: Singers

YouTube information
- Channel: Mat and Savanna Shaw
- Years active: 2020–present
- Genre: Singing
- Subscribers: 700 thousand
- Views: 102 million
- Last updated: Apr 15, 2026

Mathew Shaw and his daughter Savanna Shaw (born August 4, 2004 (Note: An article in Deseret News published on May 15, 2020, said Savanna Shaw was 15 years old. An article in Bombo Radyo Philippines published on August 19, 2020, said Savanna Shaw was 16 years old. The combination of the two sources verifies that Savanna Shaw turned 16 in 2020, which means she was born in 2004. The duo's Facebook account said on August 4, 2021, "17 years ago today the most precious little gift was placed in our arms! August 4, 2004 was an incredibly blessed day - yet nothing could have prepared us for the beautiful journey being Savanna's parents would take us on.")) are an American musical duo from Utah. They began releasing music videos when the COVID-19 pandemic started in 2020.

At the beginning of the pandemic, Savanna's choir practices were canceled. To remain connected with her friends, she created her first social media account, an Instagram account. For her first post on the account, she asked Mat, her father, to sing "The Prayer" with her since she was too shy to sing by herself. After recording it, they published it on Instagram in late February 2020 and then Facebook, where it went viral. They created a YouTube account on March 6, 2020. The Shaws were interviewed by Good Morning America, The Kelly Clarkson Show, and a show in Japan.

On October 23, 2020, they released a 13-song album titled Picture This, which had an eponymous original song that told the story of how they shot to fame. After selling 12,000 copies, the album was ranked number one on Billboard's Emerging Artists and Classical Albums charts and 54th on the Billboard 200. On November 20, 2020, they released a seven-song extended play titled Merry Little Christmas. The Shaws released a third album, Stand By Me, on May 21, 2021 and a fourth album, The Joy of Christmas, on November 5, 2021. In 2022, the duo released their fifth and sixth albums, Happy Like That and Christmas Together.

== Personal life and music career ==
Mathew (Mat) Shaw, was born on July 26, 1980. (Note: An article in Bombo Radyo Philippines published on August 19, 2020, said Mat Shaw was 40 years old. The combination of the two sources verifies that Mat Shaw turned 40 in 2020, which means he was born in 1980. On July 24, 2020, Mat Shaw said on Twitter that his birthday was on July 26. The combination of the three sources verifies that Mat Shaw was born on July 26, 1980.) His grandparents and great-grandparents lived in Valencia and he lived in Newhall in his early years. Both Valencia and Newhall are in Santa Clarita, California. After Shaw's father died when he was 14, the family experienced monetary difficulties and he moved with his family to Kaysville, Utah. In his youth, he was passionate about singing and had aspirations to become a Broadway performer and create music. During his high school years Shaw was a choir member and musical theater performer.

Shaw was a student at Farmington Junior High School, where he performed in a play adaptation of the novel The Best Christmas Pageant Ever in 1994. He went to Davis High School, where in 1996 he played the banker Bobby Childs in the musical Crazy for You and in 1997 he played the factory superintendent Sid Scrokin in the musical The Pajama Game. He served as a Church of Jesus Christ of Latter-day Saints missionary for two years beginning in 2000 in Cebu, a province of the Philippines. With funding from a vocal performance scholarship, he studied at Weber State University, graduating with an accounting degree. Shaw was a member of the Army National Guard for eight years. He and a partner own a real estate business. Concentrating on building up his real estate firm, he devoted less energy to music, saying in an interview, "My priority was to make sure that my family was secure and taken care of and I knew music wasn't going to do that for my family." At home, Shaw continued to sing which sparked his daughter, Savanna, to start singing. He is married to Brooke Shaw, and they live in Kaysville, Utah with their four children, Savanna, Easton, Eric, and Pennie Jean. Mat said that his favorite love song was Jim Brickman's song "Love of My Life", which was the earliest song he sang for Brooke before they were married. During their wedding, Mat and Brooke Shaw sang the song as a duet.

Savanna Shaw was born on August 4, 2004, the oldest of the four Shaw children. As a young child, she enrolled in voice lessons and harp classes. Savanna enrolled in a choir for children organized by the Hale Center Theatre. A shy girl, she developed close friendships with the choir members. Owing to the COVID-19 pandemic, the rehearsals were discontinued at the beginning of March 2020. Shaw created an Instagram account to remain connected with friends from her choir. The account was her inaugural foray into social media. As her initial post on the account, she wanted to record a cover of the Celine Dion and Andrea Bocelli song "The Prayer", however she didn't want to sing it by herself. Savanna approached Mat while he was doing yard work to ask him to sing the song with her. He was wearing a Brigham Young University cap and a family reunion T-shirt and Savanna wanted him to be more presentable, but he brushed her suggestion off, saying, "Savanna, your choir friends aren't going to care what I'm wearing. It's not a big deal."

The first platform they chose to upload the four-minute video to was Instagram. Mat next uploaded the video to Facebook to allow family members including his mother who lacked an Instagram account to view it. Receiving a substantial amount of attention on Facebook, they started their "Mat and Savanna Shaw" YouTube account on March 6, 2020. Having little technical experience, they spent several hours to complete the YouTube upload. By a few days later, it had 2,700 views and 60 shares; three months later it had received more than six million views. After the video received one million views, Mat and Savanna uploaded their cover of a second song, "A Million Dreams". At the end of March 2020, the duo did their first two interviews with the local television stations KSTU and KTVX. By October 2023 they had over 650,000 YouTube subscribers. According to Deseret News journalist Lottie Elizabeth Johnson, the Shaws' cover of "The Prayer" acquired them "a massive following" and "[w]ith one video, they've achieved more success than many people who go on shows like America's Got Talent and The Voice".

The duo use a closet as their recording studio and practice location. They use a small mic connected to an iPad and supported by some pajama pants to record their singing. While playing the audio recording of their closet performance, they sit at their kitchen table videotaping themselves singing to it. In May 2020 Ken Davenport, an executive producer for Andrew Lloyd Webber, interviewed the Shaws. He introduced them to the Broadway actress Sierra Boggess, who played Christine Daaé in The Phantom of the Opera and whom Savanna greatly admires. When Mat was a youth, The Phantom of the Opera was the first live performance he saw. His mother required him to read the book before he could watch the show. During the pandemic, Savanna regularly viewed performances of the musical while sheltering at home. Davenport offered to pay for the father and daughter to travel to New York and watch the musical live after the Broadway shutdown ended. Davenport said to them, "You have put such love and such joy and such positivity in the world. You've done obviously such good for so many millions… of people that this is just a little small something to say thank you from all of us on Broadway."

The Shaws perform songs which resonate with them, including the Colbie Caillat song "Try" and the Coco song "Remember Me". They share on social media why they selected those songs. Mat Shaw said on Facebook that "Try", a song about body image, speaks about identity and about how other people's views about you can affect you. He wrote, "I want my daughters to know that they never need to change themselves to belong. Find your people. Love yourself. I will love you forever." They like to perform songs from Broadway musicals and big band songs as well as 1950s and 1960s songs.

In a July 2020 livestream video, Mat said the duo are "intentionally vague" regarding the topics of religion and politics. He said, "We want people to come to our music and have it be a safe place where you can feel what you want to feel without us pushing our beliefs or agenda." In August 2020, they created the website The Shaw Fam backed by Patreon; it lets their fans send them money to receive membership benefits such as recommending the songs they should sing next and the ability to view videos before non-members can see them. They decided against signing with a label because they wanted to have full power over what music they could make and what events they could attend. The Shaws organized a food drive on November 24, 2020 in Sandy, Utah and Kaysville, Utah, after they discovered that the Utah Food Bank was having difficulty in meeting the need for food caused by the COVID-19 pandemic. After the 2022 Russian invasion of Ukraine, Mat Shaw sang a cover of "Bring Him Home" from Les Misérables and donated profits to International Rescue Committee, which used the funds to help Ukrainian families.

The Shaws have received substantial media attention including Good Morning America and The Kelly Clarkson Show. The New York Times's Jon Caramanica said the duo "became a quarantine-era YouTube success story for their acoustic duets of religious-esque songs that were pinpoint precise, verging on stern". They have been recognized during trips in public such as to Costco. Mat put in less time working at his real estate firm, which had had its business diminished at the beginning of COVID-19, opting to devote his time to singing practices, recording, and promoting their albums. His colleague at the practice picked up the slack. Although she was very bashful before having success with "The Prayer", she gained confidence and soon became more sociable. Savanna transferred from her high school, going to virtual school to give her the ability to spend her energies on making music. She graduated a year in advance of her class completing her final two years of high school by 2021.

== Albums ==
=== Picture This ===
The Shaws initially wanted to write an original song to share more information about themselves. Instead of releasing a single song, they decided to create an album since they had wanted to make one. While recording their first album, Picture This, they used a "professional" recording studio instead of the home closet studio they had been using for their videos. On the album are songs that had been suggested by their fans, that they liked, or had been chosen by Stephen Nelson, who arranged the music. They released their first album on October 23, 2020, containing 13 songs. The Shaws enlisted the assistance of their extended family to load and send 10,000 CDs of the album. Initially expecting it to take about half a year for the 10,000 CDs to sell out, they received a large number of pre-orders and ran out before their album's release date, which was two weeks after they had placed the order. The duo placed a second order for 10,000 additional CDs. Their house turned into a repository for CDs, and they worked in the living room and kitchen to prepare the albums. The Shaw children assisted and received pocket money for their effort. Pennie Jean Shaw, Mat's six-year-old daughter contributed by writing her initials and penciling in a small heart on some of the labels on envelopes used to mail the albums. The album was ranked first on the iTunes pop and classical charts, ranked third on the iTunes chart that included all song genres, and ranked third on Amazon. After it sold "12,000 equivalent album units" based on MRC Data, it was ranked first on Billboard's Emerging Artists chart on November 7, first on its Classical Albums chart, and 54th on the Billboard 200.

The first song is a mashup of the songs "Fly Me to the Moon" and "Come Fly with Me". Savanna selected the song calling herself an "old soul". The second song is "I Hope You Dance" and was recommended by Nelson, their arranger. The third song is "Picture This", an original song that the father and daughter began composing in July 2020 to describe how they suddenly became famous. They published a music video for the song on the same day they released their album. Mat said, "This song is about just being brave, and what if all it takes is a moment believing, a single moment of courage, putting yourself out there, and you just never know what will happen, what kinds of opportunities, what kinds of dreams will come true." The fourth song is "You Raise Me Up", which they first published the cover for in August 2020 and was the song that their audience most asked for. The fifth song was suggested by their audience and is "What the World Needs Now Is Love", which they published a cover for in September 2020. The sixth song is the Colbie Caillat song "Try" and the seventh is "Only Hope", which had been sung by Mandy Moore, whom Savanna admires. The eighth song is the Coco song "Remember Me". The ninth song is the Beatles' "Let It Be". They published their cover of it as a single in July 2020 and it was the initial song they made in "professional" recording studio.

The tenth song is Phillip Phillips's "Gone, Gone, Gone" and was proposed for inclusion by Stephen Nelson. Although they were initially reluctant to perform it, they grew to appreciate it. The eleventh song is "Hallelujah" with Nelson participating as a singer. Around 2009, the father and daughter were audience members at a recital where Nelson was playing the piano and singing "Hallelujah". Mat was "spellbound" by the performance. Mat and Savanna have another version of "Hallelujah" which they recorded with Peter Hollens. The twelfth song is "Tonight You Belong to Me" and the thirteenth song is "The Prayer", which has a different arrangement from the cover they released in February 2020.

=== Merry Little Christmas ===
The duo released an extended play on November 20, 2020, titled Merry Little Christmas that had seven songs. By November 27, they had sold over 12,000 copies of the album. For their debut album the Shaws had worked on preparing the albums in their living room and kitchen. For their Christmas EP, they relocated the packaging work to their basement where they labored at night to encase the CDs. The first song is "O Come, All Ye Faithful", which has music from a guitar, drums, a cello, and a piano accompanying their singing. The second song is "Have Yourself a Merry Little Christmas" and has their arranger Stephen Nelson playing the piano. The third song is "Mary, Did You Know?" and was the most asked for by their audience. The fourth song is a jazz arrangement and mashup of "Let It Snow" and "Walking in a Winter Wonderland". The fifth song is "O Holy Night" and was the second most asked for by their audience. The Shaws chose to include the song in their album very late into its production. The same week that they were preparing to mail out CDs of their first album, they practiced how to sing the song and record it. The sixth and seventh songs are "I Heard the Bells on Christmas Day" and Josh Groban's "Thankful" from his album Noël. In its first week and for the week of December 4, the album was ranked first on Billboard's "Classical Crossover Albums" chart.

In Jon Caramanica's review of the album, he said that their cover of "Mary, Did You Know?" is "poignant and elegantly spacious, almost nervy in its conviction", their performance of "I Heard the Bells on Christmas Day" has surprising parallels to the Extreme song "More Than Words", and their cover of "Thankful" has the two "harmoniz[ing] into billowy bliss". He noted that in their album Mat "booms like a drill sergeant" and Savanna "sings with airy sweep". In an AllMusic review, critic Marcy Donelson gave the album 3.5 stars out of five, and praised the duo for their "graceful, stage musical-friendly singing deliveries". She said that they "fare best here with their piano-accompanied arrangements of the more tender selections" such as a "string-embellished" "Mary, Did You Know?", "Thankful", and "a well-harmonized" "O Holy Night".

=== Stand By Me ===
The Shaws released their third album titled Stand By Me on May 21, 2021. On that day, to mark the occasion, the two performed at Salt Lake City's Eccles Theater for the first time. The concert had in-person attendees and also was livestreamed for online viewers. They completed the album's recording around March 2021. Arranged by Stephen Nelson, the album has 13 songs. The first song is the Coldplay song "Something Just Like This" and uses strings and background singing. The second song is a mashup of Ben E. King's "Stand by Me" and The Temptations's "My Girl". The third song is "You'll Be in My Heart", a Phil Collins song written for the 1999 film Tarzan. The Shaws sang it with Madilyn Paige, a contestant on The Voice's sixth season. The fourth song is the Hunter Hayes song "Invisible", which the Shaws made available in April 2021 to promote Autism Awareness Month. The fifth song is the "Pie Jesu" segment of Andrew Lloyd Webber's Requiem. As an admirer of Lloyd Webber's music, Savanna enjoyed "Pie Jesu" though was worried about singing it. After performing the song, she found that it allowed her to exercise new aspects of her voice, which gave her more confidence. The sixth song is "Annie's Song", a John Denver song. Out of the entreaties the Shaws receive, their followers called for them to perform a Denver song the most. Mat, who had listened to Denver songs as a youth with his dad who was a Denver fan, had a sentimental experience performing the song. The seventh song was "For Good" from the musical Wicked. When Savanna watched Wicked as a 10-year-old, the experience kindled her strong interest in becoming a singer.

The eighth song is the Christian hymn "Amazing Grace". With their arranger Nelson playing the piano, the Shaws collaborated with a gospel choir and the soloists Aitana Alapa and Mark Vaki. The ninth song is "Better Song" by Jack Johnson. The duo added the song to the album at Savanna's urging despite originally not planning to do so. The tenth song is "Homeward Bound", a song composed and written during World War I. When his children were younger, Mat sang it to them like a lullaby. Nicole Pinnell, a cellist, accompanied Mat and Savanna in their cover of the song. The eleventh song is "Dear Fear", which is the Shaws' second original song. The song is a message about Savanna facing uneasiness and apprehension. Savanna's mother, Brooke, participated in writing the song and said, "The purpose of this song and the message that we really hope to portray is that you can be afraid and also be brave at the same time. Vulnerability is just part of progression in our lives, and Savanna really felt like she wanted to write a song about this because it's been such a big part of her year... It's learning that you don't have to run from the things that scare you, it's OK to allow them to exist inside of you while still just pressing on." The twelfth song is "You Will Be Found", a Dear Evan Hansen song that the duo received numerous entreaties from viewers to cover. Mat said, "People have just been put through the wringer this past year, and there's a lot of loneliness, anxiety, insecurity. This song is just an anthem to say, 'We're here for you, if nothing else through our music. You're not alone.'" The thirteenth song is "Keep Us Safe", a song that Carrie Underwood helped co-write and sang during the 2014 concert event "ACM Presents: An All-Star Salute to the Troops". The song is a reference to the Shaws cover of "The Prayer", which made them go viral. Lottie Elizabeth Johnson of Deseret News summed up the album, "For the Shaws, the common thread across all of the songs on the album is a message of hope—which has been their main focus ever since performing 'The Prayer' from their kitchen table more than a year ago."

=== The Joy of Christmas ===
Mat and Savanna released their fourth album, The Joy of Christmas, on November 5, 2021. With an original song and classic Christmas music, the eleven-song album includes performances with other artists. The first song in the album is "Sleigh Ride" which features a collaboration with Caleb Chapman's Crescent Super Band who provide a "jazzy, big band feel". The second song is The Polar Express song "Believe". It had been sung by Josh Groban who is among Mat's most admired singers. Viewers noted there are many similarities in Groban's and Mat Shaw's singing. The third song is "More than Hands Can Hold", an original about how Christmas is not about material things. While he was in the Philippines, Mat Shaw saw the children being elated during Christmas. He was moved by how the children's jubilance was rooted not in gifts but in basic stuff. The fourth song is the Jim Brickman song "A Little Bit of Christmas" with whom they sang the song. When Mat Shaw started studying the piano, Brickman's song "Love of My Life" was an early one he mastered. Mat Shaw used the song to woo his wife, and during their wedding they did a duet of it. The fifth song is "White Christmas" and has "a bossa nova style twist".

The sixth song is a mashup of "Where Are You Christmas?" and "When Christmas Comes to Town" and features Pennie Jean Shaw, Savanna's seven-year-old sister. Although Pennie Jean at first was uneasy about performing, she overcame her nervousness, singing her piece confidently in a recording studio. The seventh song is "You're a Mean One, Mr. Grinch" and is their second collaboration in the album with Caleb Chapman's Crescent Super Band. The Shaws originally had bantered about including the Grinch in their album before deciding to do a full-length rendition. The eighth song is Amy Grant's "Breath of Heaven", which from Mary, mother of Jesus's point of view shares the Nativity of Jesus. The ninth song is a mashup of "Silent Night" and "Still, Still, Still". The ninth song is "Angels We Have Heard on High" and includes a collaboration from a gospel choir. Several choir members had collaborated with the Shaws for their "Amazing Grace" cover. The eleventh song, "Mary, Did You Know?", has the duo performing with Gentri, a trio of tenors with whom they had sung at a Christmas concert in 2020.

=== Happy Like That and Christmas Together ===
The Shaws released a fifth album titled Happy Like That on July 29, 2022. The album featured three original songs and renditions of the Joni Mitchell song "Both Sides, Now", The Prince of Egypt song "When You Believe", the Beatles song "Here Comes the Sun", and the MercyMe song "I Can Only Imagine". The duo made a music video for "When You Believe" at Spiral Jetty, a sculpture on the shore of Great South Lake. They said they chose the location because it "show[s] that when you're in the middle of life—from an earthly perspective—it might appear chaotic and without much purpose. However, when you zoom out and look at things from a heavenly perspective, you see that what you thought was chaotic was actually a beautiful work of art after all."

The duo released a sixth album titled Christmas Together in November 2022. The album featured an original song and eight other Christmas songs. Brickman, BYU Vocal Point, and father-daughter duo Dave and Claire Crosby contributed to the album. In the week it was released, Christmas Together ranked first on the iTunes Holiday chart.

== Shows ==
The Shaws performed in an inaugural concert on September 5, 2020 for Operation Underground Railroad at River Bottoms Ranch in Midway, Utah. Mat became emotional during the concert reflecting on how the audience applauded his daughter's singing ability after she put in a lot of time and effort rehearsing. Savanna called it "a special moment on stage" since she had never observed him to cry. On November 28, 2020, the duo performed at a live virtual concert titled "What The World Needs Now: An Evening of Music and Inspiration with Mat and Savanna Shaw". Sierra Boggess was the concert's director. They sang Broadway and holiday songs, sang their original song "Picture This", and told stories about their lives. Prior to the November 2020 concert, Savanna's mother presented her with a gift, a bracelet decorated with silverfish and goldfish shown swimming in different directions. Brooke Shaw told her, "This just reminded me of you because you're choosing a different path." On December 1, 2020, the Shaws were the first performers in the Temple Square Christmas concert "Celebrating the Light of the World" during which they sang "O Come, All Ye Faithful".

On December 5, 2020, the Shaws performed at two shows at the Maverik Center alongside Gentri in "'Tis the Season — A Christmas Concert with GENTRI and Friends". On December 20, 2020, they participated in a livestream Christmas concert hosted by the United States Army Field Band. Between November 30, 2021, and December 22, 2021, the Shaws went on a small tour called "The Joy of Christmas Tour" with 10 performances in cities in Alabama, Arizona, California, Oregon, and Utah. The Shaws performed at Vivint Arena on May 14, 2022 during the LoveLoud Festival, which shows support for LGBTQ young people. In November and December 2022, alongside Jim Brickman, the duo headlined a Christmas-themed tour in 11 locations in the United States in the states of California, Colorado, Idaho, Kansas, Michigan, New York, Ohio, Oregon, South Dakota, and Washington.
