= America's Freedom Festival at Provo =

Non-profit foundation located in Provo, Utah, United States

Coordinates: 40°15′27″N 111°39′16″W

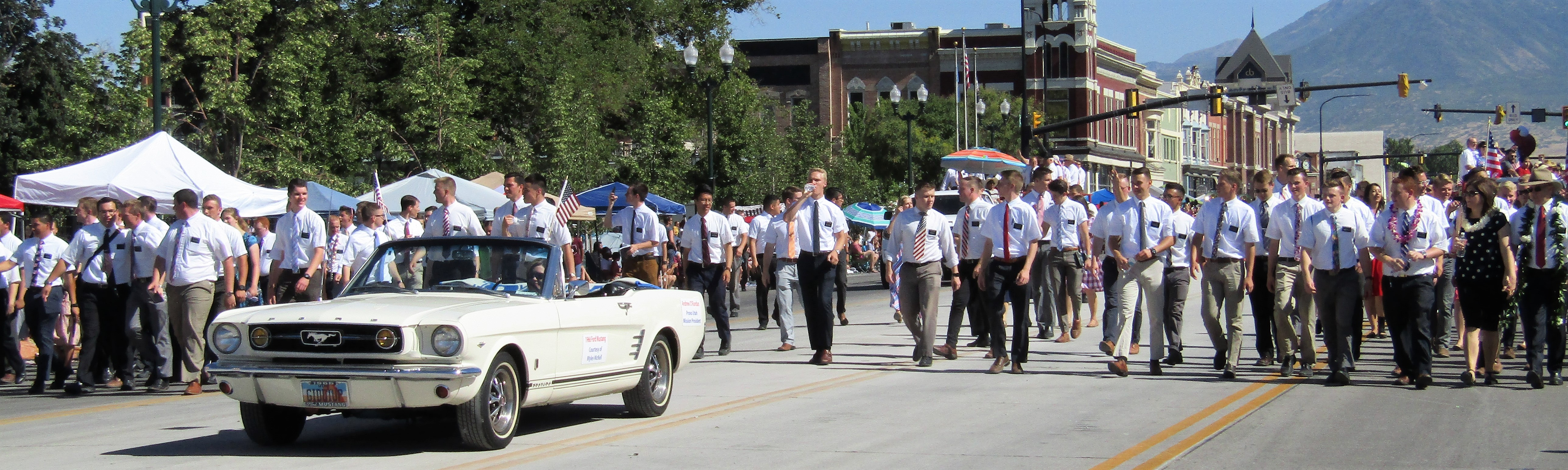
Latter Day Saints missionaries at the Freedom Festival in 2018

America's Freedom Festival at Provo (also America's Freedom Festival or Freedom Festival) is a private, non-profit foundation known for organizing more than 25 annual patriotic events in and around Provo, Utah. It is one of the largest and longest (usually May - July) patriotic celebrations in the nation. The organization's stated mission is to "celebrate, teach, honor, and strengthen the traditional American values of family, freedom, God, and country." America's Freedom Festival sponsors one of the nation's largest Fourth of July celebrations, Stadium of Fire, held each year at LaVell Edwards Stadium on the campus of Brigham Young University. Recent performers at Stadium of Fire include Journey (band), Cirque du Soleil, Carrie Underwood, Brad Paisley, and the Blue Man Group. The United States Department of Defense has chosen to broadcast parts of the festival to millions of servicemen and women serving abroad in the Armed Forces for the past several years.

The festivities usually include a patriotic service, hot air balloon launches, a carnival, and a parade. Among the most popular events included is a Colonial Heritage fair, in which colonial skills, craftsmanship, and history are taught and celebrated.

== Controversies ==
In 2008, disbarred attorney Jack Thompson was awarded the Freedom Award by the Freedom Festival, despite trying to remove first amendment protections for video games and social media posts.

In May, 2015, America's Freedom Festival disallowed the group Mormons Building Bridges from marching in the America's Freedom Festival Parade, after an unsuccessful bid to join the parade the prior year. Mormons Building Bridges was planning a march of gay and transgender military veterans. No explanation was given for the rejection.

On July 3, 2017, Encircle, a Provo-based LGBT+ resource center reported that they were no longer allowed to participate in the America's Freedom Festival Parade, despite prior approval. They were told that they could not participate because they were being classified as an “advocacy group." State Senator Jim Dabakis called on the state legislature to discontinue the $100,000 per year funding the state provided the festival, stating, "to force state taxpayers to participate and support this board, which is clearly over the line, is morally reprehensible."
