= Gentri (musical group) =

Music group

- Genres: Classical; Pop; Cinematic pop
- Years active: 2014-present
- Members: Casey Elliott; Bradley Quinn Lever; Brad Robins; Stephen Nelson (Producer)
- Website: gentrimusic.com

Gentri, stylized as GENTRI, an abbreviation of the Gentlemen Trio, is an American musical trio. Founded in 2014, the group is known for its blend of classical and pop music, referred to as "cinematic pop." The group consists of tenors Casey Elliott, Bradley Quinn Lever, and Brad Robins, along with producer Stephen Nelson. Gentri's work has been met with positive reception, reaching the top of multiple Billboard charts.

== History ==
GENTRI, short for "The Gentlemen Trio," was founded in June 2014 in Salt Lake City, Utah, by tenors Brad Robins, Casey Elliott, and Bradley Quinn Lever, along with composer and producer Stephen Nelson. The group was formed with the goal of creating music that combined classical and cinematic influences with popular music, a style they later dubbed "cinematic pop."

The idea for GENTRI originated when the three vocalists were cast together in a regional production of Les Misérables at Hale Centre Theatre in Sandy, Utah and discovered their shared artistic vision. Nelson, an accomplished composer and arranger, joined shortly thereafter to help shape the group's distinct sound. The group quickly gained attention for their powerful harmonies, inspirational message, and emotionally resonant performances.

In 2015, GENTRI released their self-titled debut EP, which climbed to #2 on Billboard’s Classical Crossover chart and #5 on the Classical chart. Their follow-up full-length album, Rise, released in 2016, reached #1 on the Billboard Classical Crossover chart, solidifying their position in the genre.

Since then, GENTRI has released multiple albums and EPs, including Finding Christmas (2016), Hymns (2018), Season of Light (2021), and Hymns II (2024). Their music videos, known for their cinematic production quality, have amassed over 200 million views across social media platforms and have been featured by outlets such as ABC World News, NBC Nightly News, and Inside Edition.

The trio has performed across the United States and internationally, sharing the stage with artists such as Kristin Chenoweth, Idina Menzel, and Alfie Boe, and headlining concerts in venues like the Eccles Theater in Salt Lake City and Tuacahn Amphitheatre in Ivins, Utah. They have also collaborated with notable organizations including the Tabernacle Choir at Temple Square and Millennial Choirs & Orchestras.

Throughout their career, GENTRI has remained committed to promoting uplifting and faith-centered values through their music, often drawing from their shared backgrounds in musical theater and their roots in the Intermountain West.

== Discography ==
Albums:

- GENTRI (2015)
- Rise (2016)
- Finding Christmas (2016)
- Hymns (2018)
- Prologue (2018)
- Noel (2019)
- Season of Light (2021)
- Hymns II (2024)

EPs:

- Merry Christmas (2015)

Singles:

- Say Something/Angel feat. Madilyn Paige (2016)
- Let It Be (2017)
- Just the Way You Are (2017)
- Bless the Broken Road (2017)
- Blackbird (2018)
- You Say / Wind Beneath My Wings feat. Ryan Innes, Yahosh, O/B/A, & EJ Michels (2019)
- God Bless the USA (2019)
- Circle of Life feat. Yahosh, O/B/A, & Conlon Bonner (2019)
- Edelweiss (2019)
- Danny Boy (2019)
- Somewhere Over the Rainbow / I'm Yours (2019)
- Phantom of the Opera feat. Richard Elliott (2019)
- Somebody to Love (2020)
- Choose You Still (2020)
- Choose You Still - Live Studio Version feat. Jessie Funk (2020)
- You Are the Reason feat. Ashley Hess (2020)
- You Are the Reason - Live Studio Version feat. Ashley Hess (2020)
- Because You Loved Me feat. Jay Warren (2020)
- Because You Loved Me - Live Studio Version feat. Jay Warren (2020)
- Rise Up / I Lived (2020)
- Do You Hear What I Hear - Live Studio Version feat. Bri Ray (2020)
- Hard to Say I'm Sorry (2021)
- Les Miserables Medley - Live Version (2021)
- The First Noel feat. Peter Hollens (2021)
- Love is Alive (2022)
- Bring a Torch, Jeanette, Isabella (2022)
- Defying Gravity (2024)
- Away in a Manger (2024)
