= The Osmonds discography =

The discography of American music group The Osmond Brothers consists of twenty-eight albums and forty-three singles.

They came to prominence as The Osmonds, being regular guests on The Andy Williams Show through the 1960s as children. Their greatest period of commercial success was in the early 1970s, performing a variety of pop genres as teen idols before a transition into hard rock for several albums. They broke up in 1980, and several of the family members later reformed as The Osmond Brothers to perform country-pop with moderate commercial success.

This discography only covers songs recorded as and billed to The Osmonds or The Osmond Brothers as a whole. It does not include solo or duet recordings by members of the Osmond family, which are chronicled separately. From oldest to youngest, members of the Osmonds included siblings Alan Osmond, Wayne Osmond, Merrill Osmond, Jay Osmond, Donny Osmond and Jimmy Osmond. Not all the brothers performed with every incarnation of the group. Their sister Marie Osmond was also never officially a member of the group, but occasionally performed with them as a guest in addition to having her own solo career and performing as a duo with Donny.

Until 2008, The Osmonds' 1960s and 1970s albums had not been released on CD legitimately in any country, though the Maestro label issued numerous unauthorized bootleg recordings. The albums were finally officially reissued in 2008 by British label 7ts, a division of Cherry Red Records.

== Albums ==
=== Studio albums ===
Year	Album details	Peak chart positions					Certifications
Year	Album details	US	US Country	AUS	CAN	UK	Certifications
1963	Songs We Sang on The Andy Williams Show; Label: MGM Records E-4146 (mono)/ SE-4146 (stereo)	—	—	—	—	—	
1963	We Sing You a Merry Christmas; Label: MGM Records E-4187 (mono)/ SE-4187 (stereo)	—	—	—	—	—	
1963	Preview: The Travels of Jaimie McPheeters; Label: MGM Records PM-7	—	—	—	—	—	
1964	The Osmond Brothers Sing The All Time Hymn Favorites; Label: MGM Records E-4235 (mono)/ SE-4235 (stereo)	—	—	—	—	—	
1965	The New Sound of The Osmond Brothers Singing More Songs They Sang on The Andy Williams Show; Label: MGM Records E-4291 (mono)/ SE-4291 (stereo)	—	—	—	—	—	
1968	The Wonderful World of The Osmond Brothers; Label: CBS / Sony Records	—	—	—	—	—	
1970	Hello! The Osmond Brothers; Label: Denon International CD-77	—	—	—	—	—	
1970	Osmonds; Label: MGM Records SE-4724	14	—	—	34	—	RIAA: Gold
1971	Homemade; Label: MGM Records SE-4770	22	—	—	27	—	RIAA: Gold
1972	Phase III; *Label: MGM Records SE-4796	10	—	38	6	—	RIAA: Gold
1972	Crazy Horses; Label: MGM/Kolob Records SE-4871	14	—	37	10	9	RIAA: Gold
1973	The Plan; Label: MGM/Kolob Records SE-4902	58	—	58	20	6	BPI: Gold
1974	Love Me for a Reason; Label: MGM/Kolob Records SE-4939	47	—	46	29	13	BPI: Silver
1975	The Proud One "I'm Still Gonna Need You" in the UK; Label: MGM/Kolob Records M3G-4993	160	—	—	89	19	BPI: Silver
1976	Brainstorm; Label: Polydor/Kolob Records PD-1-6077	145	—	—	—	—	
1976	Osmond Family Christmas; Label: Polydor/Kolob Records PD-1-6083	127	—	—	—	—	
1979	Steppin' Out; Label: Mercury SRM-1-3766	—	—	—	—	—	
1982	The Osmond Brothers; Label: Elektra Asylum Records 60180	—	54	—	—	—	
1984	One Way Rider; Label: Warner Bros. Records 1-25070	—	57	—	—	—	
2012	I Can't Get There Without You; Label: Osmond Entertainment	—	—	—	—	—	
2016	Merry Christmas; Label: Osmond Entertainment	—	—	—	—	—	
2021	A Rockin' Merry Christmas; Label: Osmond Entertainment; Billed as "Jay and Merrill, The Osmonds"	—	—	—	—	—	

=== Live albums ===
Year	Album details	Peak chart positions				Certifications
Year	Album details	US	AUS	CAN	UK	Certifications
1972	The Osmonds Live; Label: MGM Records 2SE-4826	13	57	8	13	RIAA: Gold
1975	Around the World: Live in Concert; Label: MGM/Kolob Records M3JB-5012	148	—	—	41	BPI: Silver
2008	50th Anniversary Reunion Concert; Label: Denon 17678	177	—	—	—	

=== Compilation albums ===
Year	Album details	Peak chart positions	
Year	Album details	US	UK
1972	The Sensational Incredible Fantastic Osmonds; Label: MGM Records 2315 110 (New Zealand release)	—	—
1973	Greatest Hits; The Osmonds (6 songs), Donny Osmond (4 songs), Little Jimmy Osmond (2 songs); Label: MGM/Kolob Records 2315 190 (Germany release)	—	—
1977	The Osmonds Greatest Hits; Label: Polydor Records/Kolob Records PD-2-9005	192	—
2000	The All-Time Greatest Hits of the Osmond Family (Box set); Label: Curb Records	—	—
2002	20th Century Masters - The Millennium Collection: The Best of The Osmonds; Label: Polydor Records	—	—
2003	Osmondmania! Label: Polydor Records	—	—
2003	Ultimate Collection; Label: UMTV Records	—	4

== Singles ==
Year	Title	Peak chart positions							B-side	Label	Album	Certifications
Year	Title	US	US AC	US Country	CAN	CAN AC	UK	AUS	B-side	Label	Album	Certifications
1963	"Be My Little Baby Bumblebee"	—	—	—	—	—	—	—	"I Wouldn't Trade the Silver in My Mothers Hair (For All the Gold in the World)"	MGM Records	Songs We Sang on The Andy Williams Show	
1963	"The Travels of Jaimie McPheeters"	—	—	—	—	—	—	—	"Aura Lee"	MGM Records	Preview: The Travels of Jaimie McPheeters	
1964	"Mister Sandman"	—	—	—	—	—	—	—	"My Mom"	MGM Records	The New Sound of The Osmond Brothers	
1965	"Vi Sjunger Pa Svenska"	—	—	—	—	—	—	—		MGM Records	non-album single	
1966	"Ovan Regnbagen"	—	—	—	—	—	—	—			non-album single	
1967	"Flower Music"	—	—	—	—	—	—	—	"I Can't Stop"	Uni Records	non-album single	
1968	"Mary Elizabeth"	(Note: "Mary Elizabeth" reached number 103 on the Cashbox singles charts.)	—	—	—	—	—	—	"Speak Like a Child"	Barnaby Records	The Wonderful World of The Osmond Brothers	
1968	"I've Got Loving on My Mind"	—	—	—	—	—	—	—	"Mollie - "A""	Barnaby Records	The Wonderful World of The Osmond Brothers	
1969	"Taking a Chance on Love"	—	—	—	—	—	—	—	"Groove with What You Got"	Barnaby Records	The Wonderful World of The Osmond Brothers	
1970	"Movin' Along"	(Note: "Movin' Along" reached number 136 on the Record World singles charts.)	—	—	—	—	—	—	"Open Up Your Heart"	Barnaby Records	Hello! The Osmond Brothers	
1970	"One Bad Apple"	1	37	—	1	—	42 (Note: Chart position is from the official UK "Breakers List".)	35	"He Ain't Heavy, He's My Brother"	MGM Records	Osmonds	RIAA: Gold
1971	"I Can't Stop"	96	—	—	—	—	—	—	"Flower Music"	Uni Records	single reissue	
1971	"Double Lovin'"	14	—	—	9	—	—	—	"Chilly Winds"	MGM Records	Homemade	
1971	"Yo-Yo"	3	—	—	1	—	—	87	"Keep on My Side"	MGM Records	Phase III	RIAA: Gold
1972	"Down by the Lazy River"	4	—	—	1	—	40	33	"He's the Light of the World"	MGM Records	Phase III	RIAA: Gold
1972	"Hold Her Tight"	14	—	—	6	—	—	—	"Love Is"	MGM Records	Crazy Horses	
1972	"We Can Make it Together" (w/ Steve and Eydie)	68	7	—	60	—	—	—		MGM Records	The World of Steve & Eydie	
1972	"Crazy Horses"	14	—	—	12	—	2	23	"That's My Girl"	MGM Records	Crazy Horses	BPI: Silver
1973	"Goin' Home"	36	—	—	30	91	4	55	"Are You Up There?"	MGM Records	The Plan	BPI: Silver
1973	"Let Me In"	36	4	—	15	5	2	65	"One Way Ticket to Anywhere"	MGM Records	The Plan	BPI: Silver
1973	"Movie Man"	—	—	—	—	—	—	—	"Traffic in My Mind"	MGM Records	The Plan	
1974	"I Can't Stop"	—	—	—	—	—	12	64	"Flower Music"	MCA Records	single reissue	
1974	"Love Me for a Reason"	10	2	—	18	5	1	53	"Fever"	MGM Records	Love Me for a Reason	BPI: Gold
1975	"Having a Party"	—	—	—	—	—	28	85	"Sun, Sun, Sun"	MGM Records	Love Me for a Reason	
1975	"The Proud One"	22	1	—	25	4	5	—	"The Last Day Is Coming"	MGM Records	The Proud One	BPI: Silver
1975	"I'm Still Gonna Need You"	(Note: "I'm Still Gonna Need You" reached number 102 on the Cashbox singles charts.)	38	—	—	—	32	—	"Thank You"	MGM Records	The Proud One	
1976	"I Can't Live a Dream"	46	38	—	50	35	37	—	"Check It Out"	Polydor Records	Brainstorm	
1976	"Back on the Road Again"	—	—	—	—	—	—	—		Polydor Records	Brainstorm	
1979	"Emily"	—	—	—	—	—	—	—	"Rainin'"	Mercury Records	Steppin' Out	
1979	"You're Mine"	(Note: "You're Mine" reached number 138 on the Record World singles charts.)	—	—	—	—	—	—	"Hold On"	Mercury Records	Steppin' Out	
1979	"Steppin' Out"	—	—	—	—	—	—	—	"Put Your Love on the Line"	Mercury Records	Steppin' Out	
1982	"I Think About Your Lovin'"	—	—	17	—	—	—	—	"Working Man's Blues"	Elektra Records	The Osmond Brothers	
1982	"It's Like Falling in Love (Over and Over)"	—	—	28	—	—	—	—	"Your Leaving Was the Last Thing on My Mind"	Elektra Records	The Osmond Brothers	
1982	"Never Ending Song of Love"	—	—	43	—	—	—	—	"You'll Be Seeing Me"	Elektra Records	The Osmond Brothers	
1983	"She's Ready for Someone to Love Her"	—	—	67	—	—	—	—			One Way Rider	
1984	"Where Does an Angel Go When She Cries"	—	—	43	—	—	—	—			One Way Rider	
1984	"One Way Rider"	—	—	—	—	—	—	—			One Way Rider	
1984	"If Every Man Had a Woman Like You"	—	—	39	—	—	—	—			One Way Rider	
1985	"Anytime"	—	—	54	—	—	—	—			non-album single	
1985	"Baby, When Your Heart Breaks Down"	—	—	56	—	—	—	—			non-album single	
1986	"Baby Wants"	—	—	45	—	—	—	—	"Lovin' Proof"	EMI America Records	non-album single	
1986	"You Look Like the One I Love"	—	—	69	—	—	—	—		EMI America Records	non-album single	
1986	"Looking for Suzanne"	—	—	70	—	—	—	—		EMI America Records	non-album single	
1987	"Slow Ride"	—	—	—	—	27	—	—		EMI America Records	non-album single	
2018	"The Last Chapter"	—	—	—	—	—	—	—		Osmond Entertainment	non-album single	
"—" denotes releases that did not chart.

== See also ==
- Donny and Marie Osmond discography
- Donny Osmond discography
- Marie Osmond discography
- Little Jimmy Osmond discography
