= Osmondmania! =

Compilation album by The Osmonds
- Released: March 25, 2003
- Recorded: November 14, 1970 – December 13, 1975
- Genre: Pop, bubblegum pop, R&B, soul, rock
- Length: 73:43
- Label: Polydor Records

The Osmonds chronology
20th Century Masters - The Millennium Collection: The Best of The Osmonds (2002)	Osmondmania! (2003)	50th Anniversary Reunion Concert (2008)

Professional ratings
Review scores
Source	Rating
AllMusic	4/5 stars

Osmondmania! is a compilation album by The Osmonds released in 2003. It contains hit songs from The Osmonds (Alan, Wayne, Merrill, Jay and Donny) as well as Donny's solo hits, Marie's solo hits and Donny & Marie's duet hits. Although Jimmy Osmond appears on the album cover, none of his material was featured.

== Track listing ==
No.	Title	Writer	Length
1.	"One Bad Apple" (Osmonds, Osmonds)	George Jackson	2:43
2.	"Sweet and Innocent" (Donny, The Donny Osmond Album)	Rick Hall, Billy Sherrill	3:00
3.	"Double Lovin'" (Osmonds, Homemade)	Mickey Buckins, George Jackson	2:32
4.	"Go Away Little Girl" (Donny, To You With Love, Donny)	Gerry Goffin, Carole King	2:27
5.	"Yo-Yo" (Osmonds, Phase III)	Joe South	3:10
6.	"Hey Girl" (Donny, Portrait Of Donny)	Gerry Goffin, Carole King	3:06
7.	"I Knew You When" (Donny, To You With Love, Donny)	Joe South	2:45
8.	"Down by the Lazy River" (Osmonds, Phase III)	Alan Osmond, Merrill Osmond	2:36
9.	"Puppy Love" (Donny, Portrait Of Donny)	Paul Anka	3:02
10.	"Too Young" (Donny, Too Young)	Sidney Lippman, Sylvia Dee	2:59
11.	"Hold Her Tight" (Osmonds, Crazy Horses)	Alan Osmond, Merrill Osmond, Wayne Osmond	3:12
12.	"Why" (Donny, Too Young)	Peter De Angelis, Bob Marcucci	2:39
13.	"Lonely Boy" (Donny, Too Young)	Paul Anka	2:50
14.	"Crazy Horses" (Osmonds, Crazy Horses)	Alan Osmond, Merrill Osmond, Wayne Osmond	2:27
15.	"Goin' Home" (Osmonds, The Plan)	Merrill Osmond, Wayne Osmond	2:25
16.	"The Twelfth of Never" (Donny, Alone Together)	Jerry Livingston, Paul Francis Webster	2:41
17.	"A Million to One" (Donny, A Time For Us)	Phil Medley	2:53
18.	"Young Love" (Donny, Alone Together)	Ric Cartey, Carole Joyner	2:28
19.	"Let Me In" (Osmonds, The Plan)	Merrill Osmond, Wayne Osmond	3:34
20.	"Paper Roses" (Marie, Paper Roses)	Fred Spielman, Janice Torre	2:38
21.	"Are You Lonesome Tonight" (Donny, A Time For Us)	Lou Handman, Roy Turk	3:08
22.	"I'm Leavin' it (All) up to You" (Donny & Marie, I'm Leaving It All Up To You)	Don F. Harris, Dewey Terry	2:47
23.	"In My Little Corner of the World" (Marie, In My Little Corner Of The World)	Bob Hilliard, Lee Pockriss	2:48
24.	"Love Me for a Reason" (Osmonds, Love Me For A Reason)	Wade Brown, David Jones, Jr., Johnny Bristol	3:59
25.	"Morning Side of the Mountain" (Donny & Marie, I'm Leaving It All Up To You)	Larry Stock, Dick Manning	2:59
26.	"Who's Sorry Now" (Marie, Who's Sorry Now)	Ted Snyder, Bert Kalmar, Harry Ruby	2:09
27.	"The Proud One" (Osmonds, The Proud One)	Bob Gaudio, Bob Crewe	2:59
28.	"Deep Purple" (Donny & Marie, Featuring Songs From Their Television Show)	Peter DeRose, Mitchell Parish	2:47
