= The Wonder Who? =

Alias of The Four Seasons

- Also known as: The Four Seasons
- Origin: Newark, New Jersey, United States
- Genres: Pop rock
- Years active: 1965–1967
- Labels: Philips, Vee-Jay
- Members: Frankie Valli; Tommy DeVito; Bob Gaudio; Nick Massi; Joe Long

The Wonder Who? was a nom de disque of the Four Seasons for four single records released from 1965 to 1967. It was one of a handful of names used by the group at that time, including Frankie Valli (as a "solo" artist even though the Four Seasons were present on the record) and the Valli Boys. Wonder Who? recordings generally feature the falsetto singing by Valli, but with a softer falsetto than on "typical" Four Seasons recordings.

== Background ==
=== The Four Lovers ===
The Four Seasons evolved from the Four Lovers, which recorded under a variety of names between 1956 and 1960. Lead singer Valli had recorded under several pseudonyms as well, including Frankie Tyler and Frankie Valley. Songwriter/guitarist/keyboardist Bob Gaudio did the same (as Turner Disentri, i.e., "Turn of the Century") and bassist/arranger Nick Massi (as Alex Alda) after they joined the Four Lovers in 1959.

Aside from the first Four Lovers single, "You're the Apple of My Eye" in 1956, the group's (and Valli's) records failed to chart. In 1958, the Four Lovers obtained a three-year artist contract with producer Bob Crewe, which gave the group a steady stream of session work (Valli can be heard singing in the background of "Rock and Roll Is Here to Stay" by Danny and the Juniors) in addition to recording for Crewe's Peri Records.

Since the beginning of the Four Lovers, the group performed in clubs and lounges in New Jersey and offered songs in a variety of styles, from country and western to pop to doo wop to rockabilly to Broadway tunes, with a sprinkling of Italian love songs thrown in.

=== The Four Seasons hit factory ===
In 1960, the Four Lovers became the 4 Seasons, named after a bowling alley in Union Township, New Jersey. The session work (and recording under various names) continued, but now with Valli, Gaudio, and Crewe trying to sell both Gaudio compositions and Four Seasons recordings, the group finally achieved national distribution under its own name for the first time in four years. While the first single failed to sell, the second one, "Sherry", started a string of successes for the Four Seasons. From 1962 to 1966, it has been estimated that the Four Seasons had sold about 50 million records, more than any recording act except the Beatles.

In the midst of a royalty dispute with Vee-Jay Records in late 1963, the Four Seasons left the label for Philips. While Vee-Jay started recycling Four Seasons products in 1964, Philips started releasing new Four Seasons records with increasing frequency as the British Invasion began. With the blessing of Philips officials, Valli rekindled his solo career in the latter part of 1965, releasing records that were credited to him and having the group as backing musicians. In 1966 and 1967, Four Seasons records and Frankie Valli singles were listed on the Billboard Hot 100 chart, with both names appearing simultaneously in the chart in several issues of the magazine.

== The Wonder Who? history and beyond ==
On the heels of recording a live album of Broadway tunes (to complete the settlement of the group's lawsuit with Vee-Jay), Valli, Crewe, and Gaudio had planned on recording an album consisting entirely of songs written by Bob Dylan, but as recording progressed, the concept was modified to include songs by Burt Bacharach and Hal David. Valli was not happy with his vocals on the various takes of "Don't Think Twice, It's All Right" when he recorded the song with a "joke" falsetto vocal (an impression of jazz musician Rose Murphy) to reduce the tension in the studio.

An executive of Philips Records heard the recording with a "joke" vocal and wanted it to be released as a single — two years earlier, Peter, Paul, and Mary had reached the No. 9 position on the Hot 100 with their version of the song — but the recording by Valli and the band could not be released as either a Valli solo single or a Four Seasons single. Sold in a picture sleeve with a connect the dots puzzle, the record with the truncated name ("Don't Think Twice") was released as by "the Wonder Who?" in November 1965. It reached No. 12 on the Hot 100, and as it was sliding down the chart in January 1966, a Frankie Valli solo single ("(You're Gonna) Hurt Yourself") and a Four Seasons single ("Working My Way Back to You") were also in the upper half of the chart, giving three simultaneous hit records by the group under different guises.

In the wake of "Don't Think Twice", Vee-Jay reissued a Four Seasons recording, "Peanuts" (originally a 1957 hit by Little Joe and the Thrillers), credited as the Wonder Who (without the question mark). As was the case with previous Four Seasons releases of the song, the Wonder Who single did not sell and did not chart.

Two more Wonder Who? singles were released by Philips. Three of the four sides made it onto the lower reaches of the Hot 100.

"Don't Think Twice" and the other charting Wonder Who? recordings were included on Four Seasons albums, which, in their original releases, made no mention of the name that was created for single release.

While "Lonesome Road" became the last Wonder Who? single, the group continued to release both Four Seasons and Frankie Valli solo singles until 1975, when Valli had recorded "Swearin' to God" without any participation from the group (his previous hit, "My Eyes Adored You" was recorded as a Four Seasons recording, but was released as a solo record).

== Members ==
- Frankie Valli
- Tommy DeVito (died 2020)
- Bob Gaudio
- Nick Massi (died 2000)
- Joe Long (died 2021)

== Singles by the Wonder Who? ==
All Wonder Who? singles were produced by Bob Crewe.

=== "Don't Think Twice"/"Sassy" ===
Philips 40324, released October 1965. "Don't Think Twice" was originally recorded by composer Bob Dylan (as "Don't Think Twice, It's All Right") on his 1963 album, The Freewheelin' Bob Dylan. Peter, Paul, and Mary released the most commercially successful version of the song in September 1963. It reached No. 9 on the Hot 100 singles chart. The Wonder Who? version peaked at No. 12 in December 1965.

"Sassy" was an original instrumental by the Four Seasons. Composing credit was given to Bob Gaudio and Bob Crewe.

=== "On the Good Ship Lollipop"/"You're Nobody till Somebody Loves You" ===
Philips 40380, released June 1966. Composed by Richard A. Whiting and Sidney Clare, "On the Good Ship Lollipop" debuted in the 1934 Shirley Temple motion picture Bright Eyes and is most identified with Temple singing it, but the most successful commercial release of the song was by Rudy Vallee, reaching No. 4 on the Billboard chart in 1935. The Four Seasons/Wonder Who version barely made a dent on the Hot 100, reaching No. 87.

"You're Nobody till Somebody Loves You" was another chestnut, having been a hit for Russ Morgan in 1946 and recorded by numerous artists since then. It was composed by Morgan, Larry Stock, and Harry Cavanaugh. When the version credited to the Wonder Who? appeared on the Hot 100 at No. 96, it marked the only time that two positions were simultaneously occupied by the fictitious group, and the only Wonder Who? single that had both sides chart.

=== "The Lonesome Road"/"Around and Around (andaroundandaroundandaroundandaround)" ===
Philips 40471, released July 1967. Composed by Gene Austin and Nathaniel Shilkret, "Lonesome Road" was first recorded by Austin, accompanied by Shilkret directing the Victor Orchestra, in 1927 and has since been recorded by over two hundred famous artists. It was used in five motion pictures, including the motion picture Show Boat. The version by the Wonder Who? reached No. 89 in its brief appearance on the Hot 100.

"Around and Around" was a Four Seasons original composed by Gaudio and Crewe. While it appeared on this single as a song by the Wonder Who?, the same take later appeared on the B-side of the 1968 Four Seasons single "Will You Love Me Tomorrow" and was credited to the group.

=== "Peanuts"/"My Sugar" (as the Wonder Who) ===
Vee-Jay 717, released March 1966. Composed by "Little Joe" Cook, "Peanuts" was originally a No. 22 hit for Little Joe and the Thrillers in 1957 (their only chart recording). In January 1963, Vee-Jay Records released a Four Seasons single with "Peanuts" as the A-side and "Stay" as the B-side. After various disc jockeys started playing "Stay" on the radio, Vee-Jay superseded the release, issuing new singles with "Stay" on the A-side and "Goodnight My Love" as the B-side. Several subsequent reissues with "Peanuts" as the A-side failed to sell or chart, including the one credited to the Wonder Who (without the question mark).

"My Sugar" is a Gaudio-Crewe composition that made its first appearance on the 1963 Four Seasons album Big Girls Don't Cry and Twelve Others. This marked the first release of this recording on a Four Seasons (or Wonder Who) single.

== See also ==
- List of U.S. singles by Frankie Valli and The Four Seasons
- The Four Seasons
- Frankie Valli
