= The Osmonds Live =

Live album by The Osmonds
- Released: June 5, 1972
- Recorded: December 4, 1971
- Venue: The Forum (Inglewood, California)
- Genre: Bubblegum pop
- Length: 48:45
- Label: MGM
- Producer: Alan Osmond; Michael Lloyd

The Osmonds chronology
| Phase III (1972) | The Osmonds Live (1972) | Crazy Horses (1972) |

Professional ratings
Review scores
| Source | Rating |
|---|---|
| AllMusic | 3.5/5 stars |

The Osmonds Live is the first live album by The Osmonds and was released in 1972 by MGM Records. It reached No. 13 on the Billboard 200 on July 29, 1972. The album was certified Gold by the RIAA on December 30, 1972.

== Track listing ==
| No. | Title | Writer | Length |
|---|---|---|---|
| 1. | "Motown Special: My World Is Empty Without You/I'm Gonna Make You Love Me/I Can't Get Next to You" | Holland–Dozier–Holland/Kenneth Gamble, Jerry Ross/Norman Whitfield, Barrett Strong | 4:32 |
| 2. | "Double Lovin'" | Mickey Buckins, George Jackson | 1:59 |
| 3. | "Your Song" | Elton John, Bernie Taupin | 2:34 |
| 4. | "Sweet and Innocent" | Rick Hall, Billy Sherrill | 3:00 |
| 5. | "You've Lost That Lovin' Feelin'" | Phil Spector, Barry Mann, Cynthia Weil | 3:33 |
| 6. | "Proud Mary/Free" | John Fogerty, Robert Lamm | 5:56 |
| 7. | "Go Away Little Girl" | Gerry Goffin, Carole King | 2:10 |
| 8. | "Sometimes I Feel Like a Motherless Child/Where Could I Go But to the Lord?" | Traditional/James B. Coats | 3:48 |
| 9. | "We Gotta Live Together" | Buddy Miles | 4:30 |
| 10. | "Trouble/I Got a Woman" | Jerry Leiber, Mike Stoller, Ray Charles, Renald Richard | 2:18 |
| 11. | "Hey Girl" | Gerry Goffin, Carole King | 2:50 |
| 12. | "Down by the Lazy River" | Alan Osmond, Merrill Osmond | 2:50 |
| 13. | "Yo-Yo" | Joe South | 2:20 |
| 14. | "One Bad Apple" | George Jackson | 2:30 |

== Personnel ==
- Producer: Alan Osmond, Michael Lloyd
- Engineer: Ed Greene
- Anthony Loew, Sam Emerson - photography
- Recorded in concert at the Forum, Los Angeles, California, December 4, 1971

== Charts ==
=== Album ===
| Chart (1972) | Peak position |
|---|---|
| Australian Albums (Kent Music Report) | 57 |
| Canadian Albums (RPM) | 8 |
| UK Albums (OCC) | 13 |
| US Billboard 200 | 13 |

== Certifications ==
| Region | Certification | Certified units/sales |
|---|---|---|
| United States (RIAA) | Gold | 500,000^{^} |
^{^} Shipments figures based on certification alone.
