= The Proud One =

The Proud One may refer to:

- The Proud One (song), a 1966 single by Frankie Valli, covered by The Osmonds
- The Proud One (album), a 1975 album by The Osmonds

== See also ==
- The Proud Ones, a 1956 American Western film
