= Marty Mitchell =

Marty Mitchell may refer to:

- Martin Mitchell (born 1986), rugby league player
- Marty Mitchell (singer), American singer-songwriter and guitarist
