= I'm Still Gonna Need You =

- U.K. 7" single

Single by The Osmonds

from the album The Proud One
- B-side: "Thank You"
- Released: November 1, 1975
- Recorded: November 25, 1974
- Genre: Pop, Bubblegum Pop
- Length: 3:14
- Label: MGM 14831
- Songwriter(s): Vernon Bullock, Ron Preyer, Charles Ingersoll, Bobby Soloman
- Producer(s): Mike Curb

The Osmonds singles chronology
"The Proud One" (1975)	"I'm Still Gonna Need You" (1975)	"I Can't Live a Dream" (1976)

"I'm Still Gonna Need You" is a song performed by The Osmonds in 1975. It is on their 1975 album, The Proud One. Its B-side, "Thank You", is also on the album. It reached No. 38 on the U.S. Adult Contemporary chart and No. 32 in the U.K.

The mid-tempo ballad is sung primarily by Merrill Osmond and the other Osmond brothers filling in the various harmony parts during the chorus.

== Charts ==
Chart (1975)	Peak position
US Billboard Easy Listening	38
US Cashbox	102
UK Singles Chart	32
