= Crazy Horses (album) =

1972 studio album by The Osmonds

Studio album by The Osmonds
- Released: October 1972
- Recorded: March 17 – June 23, 1972
- Studio: MGM Recording Studios (Hollywood, Los Angeles)
- Genres: Hard rock; heavy metal
- Length: 33:53
- Labels: Kolob; MGM
- Producers: Alan Osmond; Michael Lloyd

The Osmonds chronology
The Osmonds Live (1972)	Crazy Horses (1972)	The Plan (1973)

Singles from Crazy Horses
- 1. "Hold Her Tight" Released: June 24, 1972; 2. "Crazy Horses" Released: October 14, 1972

Professional ratings
Review scores
Source	Rating
AllMusic	2.5/5 stars

Crazy Horses is the ninth studio album by the American singing group The Osmonds, released in 1972 by Kolob Records and distributed by MGM Records. It was the group's first album to be released under their own Kolob Records label. It entered the Billboard Top LPs chart on October 14, where it reached number 14 on December 23, 1972. Two singles were released in support of the album, "Hold Her Tight" and "Crazy Horses", both of which reached number 14 on the Billboard Hot 100 singles chart. It was certified Gold by the RIAA on January 24, 1973.

Building upon the sound of the band's previous album, Phase III, Crazy Horses is a hard rock and heavy metal album. Cited as particularly significant in the evolution of heavy metal music, author and music journalist Chuck Eddy ranked Crazy Horses as #66 in his 1991 book "The Five Hundred Best Heavy Metal Albums in the Universe". Merrill was the lead singer on most songs as he was the lead singer for the Osmonds. Jay was the lead on Crazy Horses with Alan, Wayne and Donny each taking a portions of the lead vocals on some of the songs.

== Track listing ==
All tracks are written by Alan Osmond, Merrill Osmond and Wayne Osmond except where noted.

Side 1
No.	Title	Writer(s)	Recorded	Length
1.	"Hold Her Tight"		March 17, 1972	3:18
2.	"Utah"	Merrill Osmond	June 23, 1972	2:20
3.	"Girl"	Alan Osmond, Merrill Osmond	March 17, 1972	3:38
4.	"What Could It Be"	Alan Osmond	March 17, 1972	3:20
5.	"We All Fall Down"	Alan Osmond, Jay Osmond, Merrill Osmond, Wayne Osmond	June 23, 1972	2:55
6.	"And You Love Me"	Wayne Osmond	March 17, 1972	3:40

Side 2
No.	Title	Writer(s)	Recorded	Length
1.	"Crazy Horses"		June 23, 1972	2:40
2.	"Life is Hard Enough Without Goodbyes"		June 23, 1972	3:45
3.	"Hey, Mr. Taxi"		June 23, 1972	3:05
4.	"That's My Girl"	Alan Osmond	May 3, 1972	3:12
5.	"Julie"		March 17, 1972	3:14
6.	"Big Finish"		June 23, 1972	0:18

== Personnel ==
- Producer: Alan Osmond, Michael Lloyd
- Arranger (horns): Jim Horn (Tracks 2, 5, 7, 9)
- Engineer: Ed Greene
- Recorded at MGM Recording Studios

== Charts ==
=== Album ===
Chart (1972)	Peak position
Australian Albums (Kent Music Report)	37
Canadian Albums (RPM)	10
Dutch Albums (Album Top 100)	4
Finnish Albums (Suomen virallinen lista)	16
French Albums (SNEP)	9
German Albums (Offizielle Top 100)	26
UK Albums (OCC)	9
US Billboard 200	14

=== Singles ===
Year	Single	Chart	Position
1972	"Hold Her Tight"	Billboard Hot 100	14
1972	"Hold Her Tight"	Canada	6
1972	"Crazy Horses"	Billboard Hot 100	14
1972	"Crazy Horses"	Canada	12
1972	"Crazy Horses"	United Kingdom	2
1972	"Crazy Horses"	Australia	23

== Certifications ==
Region	Certification	Certified units/sales
United States (RIAA)	Gold	500,000^{^}
^{^} Shipments figures based on certification alone.
