= The Plan (The Osmonds album) =

1973 studio album by The Osmonds

Studio album by The Osmonds
- Released: June 30, 1973
- Recorded: March 1973
- Studio: Kolob Studios (Los Angeles, California)
- Length: 38:19
- Labels: Kolob; MGM
- Producer: Alan Osmond

The Osmonds chronology
Crazy Horses (1972)	The Plan (1973)	Love Me for a Reason (1974)

Singles from The Plan
- 1. "Goin' Home" Released: June 2, 1973; 2. "Let Me In" Released: September 1, 1973; 3. "Movie Man" Released: 1973

The Plan is the tenth studio album by The Osmonds, released in 1973 by Kolob Records and distributed by MGM Records. The album contains songs that are about the Mormon faith; its name derives from the Plan of Salvation, a key tenet of the Mormon faith. It reached number 58 on the Billboard Top LPs chart. Two of the album's singles, "Goin' Home" and "Let Me In", both peaked at number 36 on the Billboard Hot 100. The album's third single, "Movie Man" (an experimental synthpop cut featuring Alan Osmond on lead vocals), did not chart.

== Development ==
According to Alan Osmond, The Plan was written while on the road both as a statement of faith and an ambitious effort to create a work on par with The Beatles' "white album". During the writing of the album, a fire at a hotel in Tennessee destroyed much of the original manuscripts, forcing the family to restart from scratch. He stated that although "Crazy Horses" was his favorite song to perform, he considered The Plan to be the group's best album and its magnum opus. Alan took the name of his autobiography One Way Ticket from a track on The Plan, "One Way Ticket to Anywhere," which he said was based on the family's life philosophy of persistently pushing forward toward their goals and never conceding defeat.

== Critical reception ==
Professional ratings
Review scores
Source	Rating
AllMusic	2.5/5 stars

In a retrospective review for AllMusic, Donald A. Guarisco gave the album a mixed 2.5 stars out a possible 5. He wrote, "Anyone who thinks of this family group as a bubblegum soul outfit will be bowled over by this incredibly ambitious outing, which attempts to explain the family's Mormon beliefs through a series of songs that cut across a wide variety of pop genres." The Osmonds proved themselves versatile at tackling a variety of musical styles, according to Guarisco, but the album was ultimately a "misfire" because the creative diversity led to a lack of cohesion for The Plan as a whole.

Sean Ross of RadioInsight noted that the Osmonds' singles in 1973 had fallen in popularity and radio airplay compared to 1971 and 1972, in part due to increased teen idol competition from The DeFranco Family.

The Church of Jesus Christ of Latter-day Saints considered the album a major success; it was speculated that the quintet had increased the number of new converts to the church by twenty-six thousand that year.

== Track listing ==
All songs written and composed by Alan Osmond, Merrill Osmond, and Wayne Osmond.

No.	Title	Recorded	Length
1.	"War In Heaven"		1:38
2.	"Traffic In My Mind"		3:55
3.	"Before The Beginning"	March 7, 1973	4:05
4.	"Movie Man"		3:36
5.	"Let Me In"	March 7, 1973	3:39
6.	"One Way Ticket To Anywhere"		3:05
7.	"Are You Up There"	March 5, 1973	4:42
8.	"It's Alright"		2:36
9.	"Mirror, Mirror"	March 5, 1973	2:24
10.	"Darlin'"	March 5, 1973	3:10
11.	"The Last Days"		3:01
12.	"Goin' Home"		2:28
Total length:			38:19

== Credits ==
- Producer: Alan Osmond
- Engineer: Ed Greene
- Recorded at Kolob Studios

== Promo video ==
To commemorate the album's release, the band produced a 10-minute music video, performing a medley of the selected songs in the following order: "Traffic in My Mind", "Let Me In", "Are You Up There?", "The Last Days", "One Way Ticket to Anywhere", and "Goin' Home". This medley was performed live, and during Wayne's flute solo intro to "Let Me In", Alan announced the recent release of "The Plan". A full video version of "Let Me In" was also released from the same taping.

== Charts ==
=== Album ===
Chart (1973)	Peak position
Australian Albums (Kent Music Report)	58
Canadian Albums (RPM)	20
Finnish Albums (Suomen virallinen lista)	16
French Albums (SNEP)	10
UK Albums (OCC)	6
US Billboard 200	58

=== Singles ===
Year	Single	Chart	Position
1973	"Goin' Home"	Billboard Hot 100	36
1973	"Goin' Home"	Canada	30
1973	"Goin' Home"	Canadian AC	91
1973	"Goin' Home"	United Kingdom	4
1973	"Goin' Home"	Australia	55
1973	"Let Me In"	Billboard Hot 100	36
1973	"Let Me In"	U.S. AC	4
1973	"Let Me In"	Canada	15
1973	"Let Me In"	Canadian AC	5
1973	"Let Me In"	United Kingdom	2
1973	"Let Me In"	Australia	65

== Certifications ==
Country	Certification	Sales
United Kingdom	Gold	100,000
