= Closeup (Frankie Valli album) =

Studio album by Frankie Valli
- Released: February 1975
- Recorded: 1974
- Studio: Mediasound (New York); Sound Factory (Hollywood)
- Genre: Rock; funk; soul; pop
- Length: 36:07
- Label: Private Stock
- Producer: Bob Crewe, Bob Gaudio

Frankie Valli chronology
Timeless (1968)	Closeup (1975)	Inside You (1975)

Closeup is an album by Frankie Valli, released in February 1975 on the Private Stock label. It had been seven years since his prior album and afforded Valli his first of two number-one solo hits in the US (in addition to five as lead singer of The Four Seasons). The LP reached number 51 on the U.S. Billboard albums chart.

The album contains two hit singles: "My Eyes Adored You" (US No. 1) and "Swearin' to God" (US No. 6). It also contains Valli's original version of "I Can't Live a Dream", which became a hit for the Osmond Brothers in late 1976.

== Reception ==
In a retrospective review, Joe Viglione of AllMusic recalled that the album "is singer Frankie Valli again finding the magic without his Four Seasons, this time in the '70s with two big hits in two different genres" and called it "an important and forgotten catalog item that needs to be expanded and re-released with bonus tracks and liner notes that give it its proper place in music history."

In his August 1975 review for Stereo Review magazine, Peter Reilly allegedly remarked that:

Frankie Valli's album and his flabby performances have a fake Fifties sound that made me think of Fabian, Annette Funicello, beach party movies, Edsels, and, eventually, the Franco-Prussian war. This last because it holds even less interest for me than the goings-on in the Eisenhower Era—I grow listless at the mere thought of even trying to find out why it happened.

== Track listing ==
Side one

1. "I Got Love for You, Ruby" (Sandy Linzer) – 3:22
2. "Why" (Bob Gaudio, Judy Parker) – 2:44
3. "He Sure Blessed You" (Bob Gaudio, Judy Parker) – 3:27
4. "Waking Up to Love" (Bob Crewe, Kenny Nolan) – 4:30
5. "I Can't Live a Dream" (Arnold Capitanelli) – 3:15

Side two

1. "My Eyes Adored You" (Bob Crewe, Kenny Nolan) – 3:33
2. "In My Eyes" (Bob Crewe, Kenny Nolan) – 4:21
3. "Swearin' to God" (Bob Crewe, Denny Randell) – 10:09

== Personnel ==
- Frankie Valli – vocals
- Larry Carlton, Mike Deasy, Jerry Friedman, Neil LeVang, Bob Mann, Jeff Mironov, Cliff Morris, Elliott Randall, Eric Weissberg – guitar
- Gordon Edwards, Chuck Rainey – bass guitar
- Ken Asher, Michel Rubini – piano
- Jim Keltner, Rick Marotta, Ronnie Zito – drums
- Victor Feldman, Jimmy Maelen – percussion
- Miss Bobbye Hall – congas
- Carl Caldwell, Carolyn Willis, Clydie King, Jackie Ward, Jo Armstead, Marti McCall, Patti Austin, Tasha Thomas – backing vocals
- Dave Tofani, George Young, Joe Farrell, Robert Keller – saxophone
- Lew Del Gatto – baritone saxophone
- Alan Rubin, Jon Faddis, Lew Soloff – trumpet
- Meco Monardo, Wayne Andre – trombone
- David Taylor – bass trombone
- Margaret Ross – harp
- George Ricci, Kermit Moore – cello
- Charles Veal Jr., Emanuel Green, Harold Kohon, Harry Cykman, Henry Roth, Jack Shulman, Jesse Ehrlich, Marshall Sosson, Max Ellen, Max Pollikoff, Peter Dimitriades, Shirley Cornell, William Hymanson – violin
- Charlie Calello – arrangements

On "My Eyes Adored You":

- Joe Long – bass
- Demetri Callas – guitar
- Gerry Polci – drums
- Lee Shapiro – keyboards
- Nick Massi – vocal arrangements

Technical

- Michael DeLugg, Val Garay – engineer
- Joel Brodsky – photography

== Charts ==
Chart (1975)	Position
Australian Albums (Kent Music Report)	70
US Billboard 200	51
