= I Can't Stop (The Osmonds song) =

- U.S. 7" single

Single by The Osmonds
- B-side: "Flower Music"
- Released: March 1971; reissued 1974
- Genre: Pop
- Length: 2:55
- Label: MCA Records 129, Uni Records 55276
- Songwriter(s): Jerry Goldstein, Wes Farrell
- Producer(s): Jerry Goldstein

The Osmonds singles chronology
| "Let Me In" (1973) | "I Can't Stop" (1971) | "Love Me for a Reason" (1974) |

"I Can't Stop" is a song written by Jerry Goldstein and Wes Farrell and performed by The Osmonds. The group released the song as a single three different times. The song was originally released in 1967, but did not chart.

After the Osmonds left Uni Records and broke through as pop stars with "One Bad Apple" for MGM Records, Uni re-released "I Can't Stop" in 1971, when it reached #96 on the Billboard chart. Uni's successor MCA Records again re-released "I Can't Stop" in 1974 for the United Kingdom market, which reached #12 on the UK Singles chart.

The song was produced by Goldstein.
