= Marty Mitchell (singer) =

American singer-songwriter and guitarist

- Origin: Birmingham, Alabama, United States
- Genres: Country
- Occupations: Singer-songwriter, guitarist
- Instrument: Electric guitar
- Years active: 1974–present

Marty Mitchell is an American singer-songwriter and guitarist, best known for his top-forty country hit "You Are the Sunshine of My Life" and the album of the same name.

== Biography ==
Mitchell was born in Birmingham, Alabama. He was discovered by Marty Robbins and performed alongside Robbins at the Grand Ole Opry at the age of 14. In 1974, he signed with Atlantic Records and released two singles. He then signed with Motown Hitsville, releasing his version of "My Eyes Adored You" that reached No. 87 on the country chart. His debut album You Are the Sunshine of My Life was released in 1977, with the title track reaching No. 34.

In subsequent years, Mitchell performed in numerous bands in the Southwest, including The Arizona Band and Stumpwater-Jak. He continues to perform in the Phoenix area.

== Discography ==
=== Albums ===
- You Are the Sunshine of My Life (1977), MC Records MC6-511S1

=== Singles ===
- "Midnight Man" (1974), Atlantic CY-4023
- "Juke Box Band" (1974), Atlantic CY-4205
- "My Eyes Adored You" (1976), Hitsville
- "Devil Woman" (1976), Hitsville
- "All Alone in Austin" (1977), MC
- "You Are the Sunshine of My Life" (1978), MC
- "In the Arms of a Woman" (1987), Door Knob
