= I Can't Live a Dream =

Single by The Osmond Brothers

from the album Brainstorm
- B-side: "Check It Out"
- Released: September 1976
- Genre: Easy Listening, Pop
- Label: Polydor Records
- Songwriter: Arnold Capitanelli
- Producers: Mike Curb, Michael Lloyd

The Osmond Brothers singles chronology
| "I'm Still Gonna Need You" (1975) | "I Can't Live a Dream" (1976) |

"I Can't Live a Dream" is a 1976 single by The Osmonds as the first track on their Brainstorm LP..

It was written by Arnold Capitanelli and first recorded by Frankie Valli in 1975 on his solo album Closeup. After The Osmonds charted a top-40 hit and easy listening chart-topper in 1975 with another Valli cover, "The Proud One," the quintet recorded "I Can't Live a Dream" as a follow-up. It was the lead single of two released from the album, and was the only one to chart. As was the case with most of the Osmonds' mid-1970s singles, only Merrill Osmond (by this point sporting a short-lived mustache to help distinguish himself from his brothers) sang lead vocals.

The song reached number 46 in the U.S. and number 50 in Canada. It was a marginally better performer on the Easy Listening charts, peaking at number 38 in the U.S. and number 35 in Canada. In the United Kingdom, "I Can't Live a Dream" reached number 37. "I Can't Live a Dream" would be the final top-100 pop hit in any country for the Osmonds in their classic lineup, and the last of any configuration of the group to date (not counting solo records).

== Chart history ==
| Chart (1976–77) | Peak position |
|---|---|
| Canadian RPM Top Singles | 50 |
| Canadian RPM Adult Contemporary | 35 |
| UK Singles Chart (The Official Charts Company) | 37 |
| U.S. Billboard Hot 100 | 46 |
| U.S. Billboard Easy Listening | 38 |
| U.S. Cash Box Top 100 | 53 |

== Other versions ==
"I Can't Live a Dream" was covered by Engelbert Humperdinck on his 1976 LP, After the Lovin'.
