= Homemade (The Osmonds album) =

1971 studio album by The Osmonds

Studio album by The Osmonds
- Released: June 19, 1971
- Recorded: February 16–21, 1971
- Studio: FAME (Muscle Shoals)
- Genre: Bubblegum
- Length: 27:33
- Label: MGM
- Producer: Rick Hall

The Osmonds chronology
Osmonds (1970)	Homemade (1971)	Phase III (1972)

Singles from Homemade
- 1. "Double Lovin'" Released: May 8, 1971

Homemade is the seventh studio album released by The Osmonds (second under that name). It reached No. 22 on the Billboard Top LPs chart on August 7, 1971. The album was certified Gold by the RIAA on January 20, 1972.

The single "Double Lovin'", a sound-alike follow-up to their previous hit "One Bad Apple" from the same songwriter, peaked at No. 14 on the Billboard Hot 100. The album included the first songwriting contributions from the Osmond Brothers themselves, with Wayne Osmond noting in 2004 that the band had to reject multiple songs, some of which became major hits, because they did not reflect their morals, and decided to start writing their own. The band would write the majority of their own songs for the next three albums.

== Critical reception ==
Professional ratings
Review scores
Source	Rating
AllMusic	3/5 stars

Dave Thompson of AllMusic described the album as "Little more than the highlights of a stage act honed through appearances at sundry cabaret clubs and on TV", also calling it "good-natured pop with a saccharine bent, and so utterly directionless that even the Jackson 5-isms that would soon be sweeping into their set (and had already distinguished their maiden hit, "One Bad Apple") have yet to be tapped."

== Track listing ==
No.	Title	Writer(s)	Recorded	Length
1.	"The Honey Bee Song (A Taste of Honey)"	Mickey Buckins	February 21, 1971	2:20
2.	"Carrie"	Merrill Osmond, Wayne Osmond	February 16, 1971	2:45
3.	"Double Lovin'"	Mickey Buckins, George Jackson	February 16, 1971	2:30
4.	"Chilly Winds"	Lalo Schifrin, Mike Charles	February 20, 1971	2:54
5.	"Shuckin' and Jivin'"	George Jackson, Mickey Buckins	February 16, 1971	2:10
6.	"The Promised Land"	Mickey Buckins	February 16, 1971	2:45
7.	"If You're Gonna Leave Me"	Alan Osmond, Merrill Osmond	February 17, 1971	3:27
8.	"We Never Said Forever"	Austin Roberts, Chris Welch	February 18, 1971	2:48
9.	"She Makes Me Warm"	Paul Williams	February 18, 1971	2:24
10.	"Sho Would Be Nice"	Alan Osmond, Merrill Osmond	February 17, 1971	3:30

== Personnel ==
- Producer: Rick Hall
- Arranger (Horns): Harrison Calloway, Jr.
- Arranger (Strings): Peter Carpenter
- Recorded at Fame Recording Studios

== Charts ==
=== Album ===
Chart (1971)	Peak position
Canadian Albums (RPM)	27
US Billboard 200	22

=== Singles ===
Year	Single	Chart	Position
1971	"Double Lovin'"	US Billboard Hot 100	14
1971	"Double Lovin'"	US Cash Box Top 100	9
1971	"Double Lovin'"	Canada RPM Top Singles	9

== Certifications ==
Region	Certification	Certified units/sales
United States (RIAA)	Gold	500,000^{^}
^{^} Shipments figures based on certification alone.
