= The Wonderful World of The Osmond Brothers =

Studio album by the Osmonds
- Released: October 1968
- Genre: Bubblegum
- Label: CBS
- Producer: Gary Klein

The Osmonds chronology
The New Sound of The Osmond Brothers (1965)	The Wonderful World of The Osmond Brothers (1968)	Hello! The Osmond Brothers (1970)

Singles from The Wonderful World of The Osmond Brothers
- 1. "I've Got Lovin' on My Mind" Released: October 1968; 2. "Clouds (Both Sides Now)" Released: January 1969; 3. "Groove with What You've Got" Released: February 1969; 4. "Make the Music Flow" Released: August 1969

The Wonderful World of The Osmond Brothers is the fourth album released by the Osmonds in 1968. Four singles were released from the album: "I've Got Lovin' on My Mind", "Clouds" (a cover version of "Both Sides, Now"), "Groove with What You've Got", and "Make the Music Flow".

== Track listing ==
No.	Title	Writer	Length
1.	"I've Got Lovin' on My Mind"	Stephen Schlaks, Charlie Weiss	2:27
2.	"Mollie "A""	Alexander C. Bernard, S.A. Saltman	2:34
3.	"Make the Music Flow"	Tony Powers, Bill Cowsill, Bob Cowsill	2:35
4.	"Clouds (Both Sides Now)"	Joni Mitchell	2:20
5.	"Mary Elizabeth"	Alan Gordon, Garry Bonner	2:20
6.	"Speak Like a Child"	Tim Hardin	2:48
7.	"Taking a Chance on Love"	Vernon Duke, John La Touche, Ted Fetter	2:40
8.	"Groove with What You've Got"	Pat Vegas, Ralph Burns	2:22
9.	"Good News"	Addrisi Brothers	2:37
10.	"Beauty and the Sweet Talk"	Bob Stone	2:46
11.	"Takin' on a Big Thing"	Alan Osmond, Wayne Osmond, Merrill Osmond, Jay Osmond	6:12

== Charts ==
Chart (1970)	Peak position
Japanese Albums (Oricon)	58
