= Swearin' to God =

- German release single

Single by Frankie Valli

from the album Closeup
- B-side: "Why"
- Released: April 1975
- Genre: Disco
- Length: 10:09 (album version); 4:05 (single)
- Label: Private Stock
- Songwriters: Bob Crewe, Denny Randell
- Producer: Bob Crewe

Frankie Valli singles chronology
"My Eyes Adored You" (1974)	"Swearin' to God" (1975)	"Our Day Will Come" (1975)

Alternative release
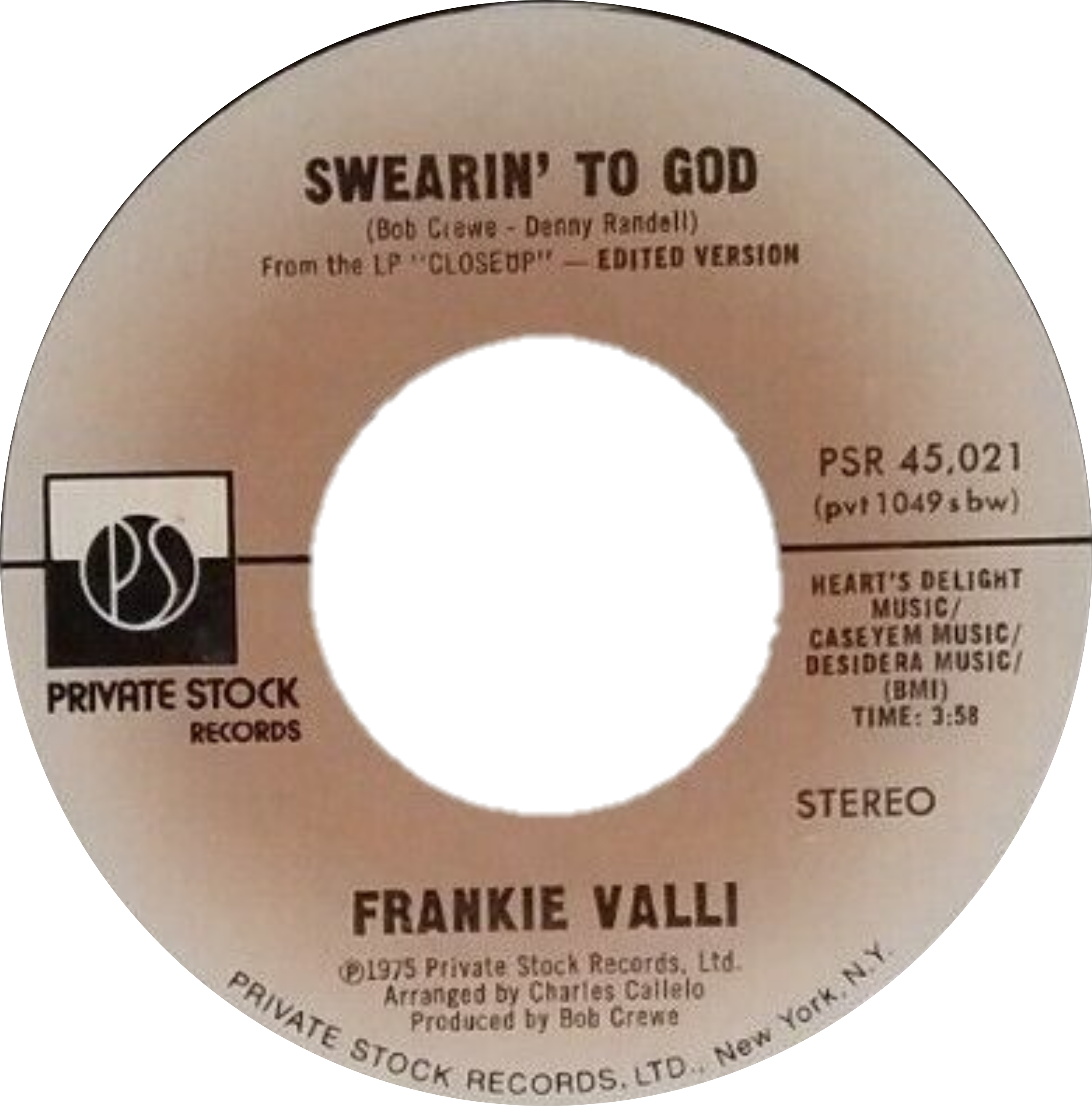
- Side A of the US single

"Swearin' to God" is a song written by Bob Crewe and Denny Randell. It was recorded by Frankie Valli and released in May 1975 as a single from his album Closeup. It is a love song whose lyrical hook is a more literal use of the expression "I swear to God" (i.e., "I mean this sincerely"):

I'm swearin' to God / So glad He's givin' me you

The first Valli song to incorporate the disco style (it runs four minutes as a single but just over ten minutes on the album), "Swearin' to God" features Patti Austin singing a response to Valli's praise in the bridge. "Swearin' to God" hit number 6 on the U.S. Billboard charts and also charted #31 in the UK.

Cash Box said of the edited single version that "Frankie's distinct vocal delivery meets a big, brassy arrangement and the result is a song that will surely skyrocket to the top."

== Charts ==
=== Weekly charts ===
Chart (1975)	Peak position
Australia (Kent Music Report)	67
Canada RPM Top Singles	10
Canada RPM Adult Contemporary	1
UK (OCC)	31
US Billboard Hot 100	6
US Adult Contemporary (Billboard)	9
US Cash Box Top 100	7

=== Year-end charts ===
Chart (1975)	Rank
Canada RPM Top Singles	43
Canada RPM Adult Contemporary	13
US Billboard Hot 100	99
US Cash Box Top 100	52
