= Tommy DeVito (musician) =

American guitarist and singer (1928–2020)

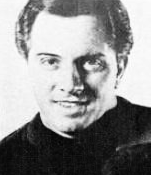
- DeVito in 1966

Background information
- Born: Gaetano DeVito; June 19, 1928; Belleville, New Jersey, U.S.
- Died: September 21, 2020 (aged 92) Las Vegas, Nevada, U.S.
- Genres: Rock, pop
- Occupation: Musician
- Instruments: Vocals, guitar
- Years active: 1950–2020
- Formerly of: The Four Seasons

Gaetano "Tommy" DeVito (June 19, 1928 – September 21, 2020) was an American musician. He was best known as a founding member, vocalist, and lead guitarist of rock band the Four Seasons.

== Early years ==
DeVito was born in Belleville, New Jersey, the youngest of nine children in an Italian-American family. At eight years old, he taught himself to play his brother's guitar by listening to country music on the radio. By the time he was 12, he was playing for tips in neighborhood taverns. He quit school after the eighth grade. (Belleville High School made him an honorary graduate in 2007.) DeVito was arrested for petty crimes and during time in prison improved on his guitar skills and by the time he was sixteen, he had his own R&B band and was making $20 or $25 a night.

== Career ==
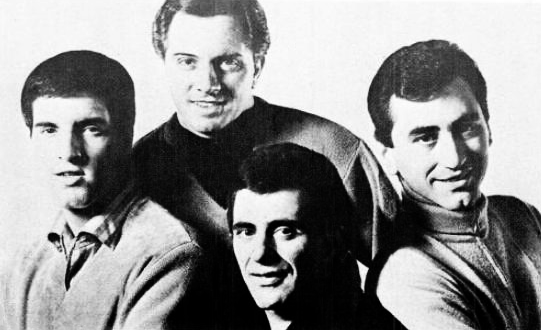
DeVito, at top, with the Four Seasons in 1966

In the early 1950s, DeVito formed "the Variety Trio" with his brother Nick DeVito and Hank Majewski. This core group performed under various names and changing lineups. The band expanded to a quartet as early as 1954 and changed its name to "the Variatones" including the addition in 1954 of singer Francis Castelluccio (later known as Frankie Valli). When they were signed to a recording contract with RCA Victor, in 1956, the quartet of DeVito/DeVito/Hank Majewski/Valli had renamed themselves "The Four Lovers". Tommy and Frankie remained the only consistent members of the Four Lovers, as the group released seven singles and one album under the Four Lovers name. Their 1956 debut single, Otis Blackwell's "You're the Apple of My Eye", achieved enough national sales to appear as a minor hit on the Billboard Hot 100 singles chart. The single landed Tommy his first national television appearance, when the Four Lovers appeared on The Ed Sullivan Show in 1956.

While his brother Nick left the group, Tommy DeVito continued his musical pursuits, reforming and realigning the group. He was close friends with Joe Pesci, who introduced DeVito and Valli to keyboardist and songwriter Bob Gaudio. By 1960 The Four Lovers consisted of DeVito, Valli, Gaudio and vocal arranger Nick Massi, and were mainly used as a backup band for producer Bob Crewe under contract. This is the lineup which adopted the name "The Four Seasons" (billed numerically as the 4 Seasons on most of their early albums), named after a bowling alley in Union, New Jersey, that had a lounge where they had auditioned. Signed by songwriter/producer Bob Crewe, the Four Seasons cut their first single under that name, "Bermuda", in November 1961. It was released by Gone Records, but did not succeed. Their next single did, in 1962 Gaudio's composition No. 1 single "Sherry". Released by Vee-Jay Records in July 1962, "Sherry" hit number one in September, the first of three consecutive chart-topping hits by the Four Seasons, the others being "Big Girls Don't Cry" and "Walk Like a Man". In 1963, DeVito and Massi co-founded Vito-Mass Productions, an independent music production business. From 1965 onward, Massi handled most of the day-to-day operations of the company while DeVito remained with the band.

DeVito left the group in April 1970 before the album Half and Half was released. He told the Las Vegas Review-Journal in 2009, "I had had it up to here with the traveling and changing clothes three times a day, and taking two planes and then driving 100 miles to do a date. Getting on stage and doing the same stuff—I just had it." Four Seasons bassist Joe Long recalled that DeVito had been adamantly against recording their most recent album, the 1969 concept album The Genuine Imitation Life Gazette. He sold Valli and Gaudio his rights to the Four Seasons' material, name, and touring act upon leaving in 1970. The reason for his departure was originally indicated as a hearing problem, but it was later revealed that he had accrued significant debt and financial trouble through gambling, which Valli and Gaudio eventually absorbed as part of the buyout, leaving the band millions of dollars in debt that would take until 1973 for them to pay off. DeVito was succeeded by Maryland native Demetri Callas, who would become a friend of DeVito's. DeVito's departure marked a shift in direction for the band; they found it difficult to replicate his style of entertainment (he and Long had proved to be particularly adept at improvisational comedy), and his successors were hired more for their talent as straight musicians.

DeVito started his amateur acting career in 1995, when he played a poker dealer in the film Casino. He was then a construction foreman in Gone Fishin' in 1997 and his last film credit was as Palmi's bodyguard in the 2006 film The Good Shepherd. All three films featured Joe Pesci in a starring role.

DeVito rejoined Valli and Gaudio (Massi had died in 2000) on stage at the 2005 Broadway opening of the documentary-style musical Jersey Boys, a Tony Award winning hit chronicling the story of the group's early days, which was later adapted to a 2014 feature film directed by Clint Eastwood.

== Later life ==
DeVito later explained that he had grown tired with the traveling demands, and in 1970 he moved to Las Vegas where several siblings lived at the time. After settling his gambling debts and affairs with an ex-wife, he had $100,000 in cash remaining from the buyout by the time he arrived in Las Vegas but squandered it all within a year of his arrival. He started a new life, and became a card dealer for three years. Times were tough for him for a while, as he discussed in a 2009 interview with Doug Elfman in the Las Vegas Review-Journal.

== Legacy ==
DeVito, along with fellow original Four Seasons Valli, Massi, and Gaudio, was inducted into the Rock and Roll Hall of Fame in 1990 and the Vocal Group Hall of Fame in 1999.

DeVito worked as an assistant to his friend, actor Joe Pesci, who named his character in the 1990 film Goodfellas after him.

== Death ==
DeVito died in Las Vegas, on September 21, 2020, at the age of 92. His death was announced on Facebook by his friend, actor Alfred Nittoli, who stated that DeVito had recently been hospitalized after contracting COVID-19 amidst the COVID-19 pandemic in Nevada.

== Filmography ==
Year	Title	Role
1995	Casino	Poker dealer
1997	Gone Fishin'	Construction foreman
2006	The Good Shepherd	Palmi's bodyguard
