= Hello! The Osmond Brothers =

Studio album by The Osmonds
- Released: September 1970
- Genre: Bubblegum
- Languages: English; Japanese
- Label: Denon
- Producer: Denon Orchestra

The Osmonds chronology
| The Wonderful World of The Osmond Brothers (1968) | Hello! The Osmond Brothers (1970) | Osmonds (1970) |

Singles from Hello! The Osmond Brothers
- 1. "Chitchana Koibito" Released: April 1970; 2. "Young Love Swing" Released: July 1970; 3. "Movin' Along" Released: August 1, 1970; 4. "Chance" Released: October 1970

Hello! The Osmond Brothers is the fifth album released by The Osmonds in 1970. Most songs were recorded in Japanese, and some were recorded in English. The album was released in Japan. Four singles were released from the album. Chitchana Koibito, Young Love Swing, Movin' Along and Chance. The single, Chitchana Koibito, (which means "My Little Darling" in Japanese) was sung by Jimmy and reached No. 1 on the Japan charts. The album was released about a month before they signed with MGM Records.

== Track listing ==
| No. | Title | Writer | Length |
|---|---|---|---|
| 1. | "Golden Rainbow" | Walter Marks | 1:59 |
| 2. | "Keep the Customer Satisfied" | Paul Simon | 2:20 |
| 3. | "Open up Your Heart" | Mike Curb | 4:51 |
| 4. | "Raindrops Keep Fallin' on My Head" | Hal David, Burt Bacharach | 2:41 |
| 5. | "Bridge over Troubled Water" | Paul Simon | 4:32 |
| 6. | "Chitchana Koibito (My Little Darling)" | M. Nakayama, Katsuo Inoue | 3:20 |
| 7. | "Young Love Swing" | Yumiko Seki | 3:39 |
| 8. | "Movin' Along" | Alan Osmond, Merrill Osmond | 2:26 |
| 9. | "Chance" | Hiroshi Aso, Katsuo Inoue | 2:27 |
| 10. | "Sha La La" | G. Go | 2:46 |
| 11. | "Scarborough Fair" | Paul Simon, Art Garfunkel | 3:08 |
| 12. | "Aquarius/Let the Sunshine In" | James Rado, Gerome Ragni, Galt MacDermot | 3:43 |

== Charts ==
| Chart (1970) | Peak position |
|---|---|
| Japanese Albums (Oricon) | 23 |
