= You're the Apple of My Eye =

1956 song by Otis Blackwell

"You're the Apple of My Eye" is a song written by Otis Blackwell and initially recorded and released as a single in 1956 by The Four Lovers, the precursor to The Four Seasons. Recorded after they were denied the opportunity to record another Blackwell song, "Don't Be Cruel", "You're the Apple of My Eye" was The Four Lovers' first exposure to U.S. national publicity, reaching the #62 position on the Billboard Hot 100 and earning the quartet an appearance on The Ed Sullivan Show. One of two Four Lovers singles issued by RCA Victor simultaneously, it was the quartet's only foray onto the Hot 100 before the formation of The Four Seasons five years later.

== Background ==
The Four Lovers (1956 personnel: Frankie Valli, Nick and Tommy DeVito, and Hank Majewski) was the eventual result of Valli joining The Variety Trio in 1954 to form The Variatones (which briefly included mutual friends on a part-time basis). The group performed at various New Jersey clubs and lounges and established a reputation for its musical versatility, incorporating country music, pop music, doo wop, Broadway standards, rhythm and blues, and an occasional foray into Italian love songs.

An RCA Records executive saw a Four Lovers performance and was impressed with the presentation enough to recommend the quartet to the company's artists and repertoire department. They were signed to the RCA Victor label for a series of records to be released in 1956 and 1957. In May 1956, "You're the Apple of My Eye"/"The Girl of My Dreams" and "Lovey Dovey"/"Please Don't Love Me" were released simultaneously by RCA. The four sides were recorded in a single April session (with two other songs that were released as a single in January 1957).

== Legacy ==
The song was featured in the jukebox musical: Jersey Boys as well as the film version.

== "You're the Apple of My Eye"/"The Girl of My Dreams" ==
"You're the Apple of My Eye"

Single by The Four Lovers
- B-side: "The Girl of My Dreams"
- Released: May 1956
- Recorded: April 1956
- Genre: Doo-wop, Rock
- Length: 2:11
- Label: RCA Victor Records
- Songwriter: Otis Blackwell
- Producer: Otis Blackwell

The Four Lovers singles chronology
"You're the Apple of My Eye" (1956)	"Lovey Dovey" (1956)

RCA Victor 47-6518. "You're the Apple of My Eye" was a last-minute substitution for another song that Frankie Valli and the group was preparing to do in the recording session, "Don't Be Cruel". Accounts differ as to the precise mechanism behind their not recording the Otis Blackwell song. Some sources indicate that The Four Lovers were told not to record the song as Elvis Presley expressed a desire to record the song himself; other sources indicate that Blackwell himself requested that the Four Lovers not record the song so he could "shop around" for a bigger act (and a better royalty deal) for the song (and succeeded when Presley's manager approached Blackwell with the idea of Presley recording "Don't Be Cruel").

Blackwell later apologized for "taking the song away from" The Four Lovers and offered a different original composition for the quartet to record. Produced by Blackwell, "You're the Apple of My Eye" was composed as a "traditional" rhythm-and-blues song, but the Four Lovers gave it more of a rock'n'roll interpretation (some music critics referred to it as so "over the top" as to be close in style to burlesque).

The single was the group's first attempt into national publicity, with sales and airplay sufficient for the record to enter the Hot 100 and to generate enough interest for Ed Sullivan to invite the group onto his weekly television program. "Apple of My Eye" was the only Four Lovers Single to achieve chart status as the other six successive singles sank without a trace in 1956 and 1957.

After the Four Lovers became The Four Seasons in 1961, "You're the Apple of My Eye" was re-recorded (as "Apple of My Eye") for the Sherry and 11 Others album (1962). The re-recording was released as a single in October 1964 and appeared briefly on the Billboard Bubbling Under the Hot 100 record chart.

The B-side of The Four Lovers single, "The Girl of My Dreams", is a cover of a song composed by Maxwell Davis, Joe Josea, Jules Taub, and Sam Ling. Jessie Belvin and Eugene Church recorded and released a recording of the song in 1956 as The Cliques.

"Honey Love"

Single by The Four Lovers
- B-side: "Please Don't Leave Me"
- Released: May 1956
- Recorded: April 1956
- Genre: Rock
- Length: 2:31
- Label: RCA Victor Records
- Songwriter: Clyde McPhatter-Gerald Wexler
- Producer: Otis Blackwell

The Four Lovers singles chronology
"You're the Apple of My Eye" (1956)	"Honey Love" (1956)	"Jambalaya" (1956)

== "Honey Love"/"Please Don't Leave Me" ==
RCA Victor 47-6519. Released the same day as "You're the Apple of My Eye", The Four Lovers' second single featured covers of two rhythm-and-blues hits from the mid-1950s. The A-side, "Honey Love", was a considerable R&B hit for The Drifters in 1956. It was composed by Drifters lead singer Clyde McPhatter and Atlantic Records producer Jerry Wexler. The Four Lovers' version was similar in style to the original, but didn't come close to attaining the level of success of either the original or "You're the Apple of Your Eye".

The B-side of the group's second single, "Please Don't Leave Me", was composed by Antoine "Fats" Domino and was originally recorded by him in 1953. It is one of the more blues-based songs in the Fats Domino catalog — and one of the most blues-based songs ever recorded by Frankie Valli and his friends, regardless of the name or membership of the group.

== After "Apple" and "Honey" ==
The management or RCA Victor and The Four Lovers were encouraged by the success of "You're the Apple of My Eye" to make arrangements for recording an album for release for Christmas sales. The result, Joyride, had a collection of rhythm-and-blues and western covers, with a few pop standards and a handful of never-before-released songs, complete with a rollicking version of "White Christmas", patterned similar to the Drifters' version from 1955. In addition, RCA was releasing Four Lovers' singles roughly every two weeks, including covers of Hank Williams' "Jambalaya", Faye Adams' "Shake a Hand", and an early vocal version of "Night Train".

Joyride and the last five RCA Victor Four Lovers singles failed to chart and failed to sell. Today, they are collector's items, with the album being worth up to $400 (US) in near mint condition and some of the singles at roughly one-third that. The group's last single, "My Life for You Love"/"Pucker Up", sold so few that the relative handful of existing copies are now selling for up to $3000 each.

By the end of 1957, The Four Lovers had no recording contract and returned to performing in clubs and lounges before being put "on hiatus", albeit briefly before a new artists contract with Bob Crewe's Peri Records gave the group a new purpose for its existence, that of supporting musicians with the occasional opportunity to record songs on their own (which they did — and release under a variety of names between 1958 and 1961). This began a sequence of events which, in four years, resulted in the group becoming The Four Seasons. The Four Seasons would then include a re-recording of the track (now with Bob Gaudio and Nick Massi in the lineup in place of Nick DeVito and Hank Majewski) on their debut album Sherry & 11 Others.
