= Love Me for a Reason (album) =

1974 studio album by The Osmonds

Studio album by The Osmonds
- Released: November 2, 1974
- Recorded: May 3 – June 6, 1974
- Studios: Kolob Studios (Provo, Utah); MGM Recording Studio (Los Angeles, California); Polydor Records Studio (London, England)
- Genre: Pop
- Labels: Kolob; MGM
- Producers: The Osmonds (exec.); Mike Curb

The Osmonds chronology
| The Plan (1973) | Love Me for a Reason (1974) | The Proud One (1975) |

Singles from Love Me for a Reason
- 1. "Love Me for a Reason" Released: 1974; 2. "Having A Party" Released: 1975

Professional ratings
Review scores
| Source | Rating |
|---|---|
| AllMusic | 3/5 stars |

Love Me for a Reason is the eleventh studio album by The Osmonds, released in 1974 by Kolob Records and distributed by MGM Records. The album peaked at No. 47 on the Billboard Top LPs chart. Two singles were released from the album: the title track "Love Me for a Reason" (No. 1 UK, No. 10 US) and "Having a Party" (No. 28 UK).

After a string of three albums (Phase III, Crazy Horses and The Plan) in which the Osmonds performed mostly their own material and focused on rock music, Love Me for a Reason consisted mostly of the work of professional songwriters, most prominently H. B. Barnum, who arranged all of the songs on the album and co-wrote three. The title track in particular was aimed at the easy listening market, continuing a string of easy listening hits for the quintet (it peaked at No. 2 on the Billboard easy listening chart). The retrenchment, reuniting with former producer Mike Curb, and focus on pop was an effort to regain some popularity the group had lost in 1973, driven by brief but intense competition from The DeFranco Family, Donny's voice changing, and the less commercially friendly content of The Plan.

== Track listing ==
| No. | Title | Writer(s) | Recorded | Length |
|---|---|---|---|---|
| 1. | "Having a Party" | Bobby Massey, H. B. Barnum | May 21, 1974 | 3:20 |
| 2. | "The Girl I Love" | Bobby Massey, H. B. Barnum | May 21, 1974 | 3:45 |
| 3. | "Love Me for a Reason" | Wade Brown, David Jones, Jr., Johnny Bristol | May 21, 1974 | 4:04 |
| 4. | "Ballin' the Jack" | Jim Burris, Chris Smith | May 21, 1974 | 3:08 |
| 5. | "Send a Little Love" | Solomon Burke | June 5, 1974 | 3:20 |
| 6. | "Peace" | Bobby Massey, H. B. Barnum | June 5, 1974 | 4:50 |
| 7. | "Gabrielle" | Denny Randell, Letty Jo Randell | May 21, 1974 | 3:30 |
| 8. | "I Can't Get Next to You" | Norman Whitfield, Barrett Strong | May 3, 1974 | 3:08 |
| 9. | "Sun, Sun, Sun" | Alan Osmond, Merrill Osmond, Wayne Osmond | May 21, 1974 | 3:32 |
| 10. | "I Can See Love in You and Me" | Gary Dalton, Kent Dubarri | June 6, 1974 | 3:08 |
| 11. | "Fever" | Denny Randell, Letty Jo Randell | May 21, 1974 | 3:15 |

== Personnel ==
- Producer: Mike Curb
- Arranger: H.B. Barnum
- Engineer: Ed Greene
- Bass Guitar: Merrill Osmond
- Drums/Percussion: Jay Osmond
- Guitar/Woodwind: Wayne Osmond
- Piano/Guitar: Alan Osmond
- Synthesizer: Donny Osmond

== Charts ==
=== Album ===
| Chart (1974) | Peak position |
|---|---|
| Australian Albums (Kent Music Report) | 46 |
| Canadian Albums (RPM) | 29 |
| UK Albums (OCC) | 13 |
| US Billboard 200 | 47 |

=== Singles ===
| Year | Single | Chart | Position |
|---|---|---|---|
| 1974 | "Love Me for a Reason" | Billboard Hot 100 | 10 |
| 1974 | "Love Me for a Reason" | US AC | 2 |
| 1974 | "Love Me for a Reason" | Canada | 18 |
| 1974 | "Love Me for a Reason" | Canada AC | 5 |
| 1974 | "Love Me for a Reason" | United Kingdom | 1 |
| 1974 | "Love Me for a Reason" | Australia | 53 |
| 1975 | "Having a Party" | United Kingdom | 28 |
| 1975 | "Having a Party" | Australia | 85 |

== Certifications ==
| Country | Certification | Sales |
|---|---|---|
| United Kingdom | Silver | 60,000 |
