= Osmonds (album) =

Studio album by the Osmonds
- Released: January 1971
- Recorded: October 26 – November 13, 1970
- Studios: FAME Studios (Muscle Shoals, Alabama); Independent Recorders (Studio City, Los Angeles)
- Genre: Bubblegum
- Length: 29:24
- Label: MGM
- Producer: Rick Hall

The Osmonds chronology
Hello! The Osmond Brothers (1970)	Osmonds (1971)	Homemade (1971)

Singles from Osmonds
- 1. "One Bad Apple" Released: November 14, 1970; 2. "Sweet and Innocent" Released: February 27, 1971

Osmonds is the sixth album released by the Osmonds, the first under MGM as the Osmonds and the first to feature lead vocal roles from Donny. The first single from the album, "One Bad Apple", became a number-one hit according to the Billboard Hot 100 singles chart. The second single from the album, "Sweet and Innocent", reached number seven, with the single sleeve crediting group member Donny Osmond as the artist. The album reached number 14 on the Billboard Top LPs chart on February 27, 1971. It was certified Gold by the RIAA on September 13, 1971.

== Critical reception ==
Professional ratings
Review scores
Source	Rating
AllMusic	3/5 stars
Christgau's Record Guide	D

Dave Thompson of AllMusic criticised the album's "Motown medley that contrarily ranks among the least soulful excursions you could imagine" and said that the album "nevertheless finds them [the Osmonds] still putting performance ahead of personality, and barely hinting at the heights they would soon be scaling".

== Track listing ==
No.	Title	Writer(s)	Recorded	Length
1.	"(Would It Make You) Think"	Bodie Chandler	November 10, 1970	2:56
2.	"One Bad Apple"	George Jackson	October 26, 1970	2:45
3.	"Catch Me Baby"	Alan Osmond	November 10, 1970	4:11
4.	"Lonesome They Call Me, Lonesome I Am"	Jimmy Elledge, Dave Day	November 10, 1970	2:38
5.	"Motown Special"	Earl Brown, Holland-Dozier-Holland, Kenneth Gamble, Matthew Ross, Williams, Barrett Strong, Norman Whitfield	November 13, 1970	3:28
6.	"Sweet and Innocent"	Rick Hall, Billy Sherrill	November 10, 1970	3:04
7.	"He Ain't Heavy, He's My Brother"	Bob Russell, Bobby Scott	November 10, 1970	3:56
8.	"Find'em, Fool'em, and Forget'em"	Rick Hall, George Jackson	November 10, 1970	2:29
9.	"Most of All"	Buddy Buie, J. R. Cobb	November 10, 1970	3:02
10.	"Flirtin'"	Kenny Nolan	October 26, 1970	2:55

== Personnel ==
- Bob Wray - bass
- Albert S. Lowe, Jr, Travis Wammack - guitar
- Leo LeBlanc - steel guitar
- Clayton Ivey - keyboards
- Fred L. Prouty - drums
- Ronnie Eades - baritone saxophone
- Harvey Thompson - tenor saxophone
- Dale Quillen - trombone
- Harrison Calloway, Jr., Jack Peck - trumpet

== Charts ==
Chart (1971)	Peak position
Canadian Albums (RPM)	34
Japanese Albums (Oricon)	65
US Billboard 200	14
US Best Selling Soul LP's	13

== Certifications ==
Region	Certification	Certified units/sales
United States (RIAA)	Gold	500,000^{^}
^{^} Shipments figures based on certification alone.
