= My Eyes Adored You =

Single by Frankie Valli

from the album Closeup
- B-side: "Watch Where You Walk"
- Released: October 1974
- Genre: Soft rock; soul
- Length: 3:32
- Label: Private Stock
- Songwriters: Bob Crewe; Kenny Nolan
- Producer: Bob Crewe

Frankie Valli singles chronology
"The Girl I'll Never Know (Angels Never Fly This Low)" (1969)	"My Eyes Adored You" (1974)	"Swearin' to God" (1975)

"My Eyes Adored You" is a 1974 song written by Bob Crewe and Kenny Nolan. It was originally recorded by The Four Seasons in early 1974. After the Motown label balked at the idea of releasing it, the recording was sold to lead singer Frankie Valli for $4000. After rejections by Capitol and Atlantic Records, Valli succeeded in getting the recording released on Private Stock Records, but the owner/founder of the label, Larry Uttal, wanted only Valli's name on the label. The record features the full group, marking the debut of Gerry Polci on tenor (harmony) vocals, with Joe Long taking lead on the final chorus. It is from the album Closeup. The Seasons debuted the song in late September 1974 at the Tulsa State Fair for an episode of The Midnight Special ahead of its release as a single in the US in November 1974; it topped the Billboard Hot 100 in March 1975. "My Eyes Adored You" also went to number 2 on the Easy Listening chart. Billboard ranked it as the No. 5 song for 1975.

The single was Valli's first number 1 hit as a solo artist on the Billboard Hot 100, and remained there for one week, being knocked out of the top spot by another Crewe/Nolan-penned song, "Lady Marmalade" by Labelle.

Cash Box called it "a mellow ballad sung only the way Frankie's sweet vocal could sing it," saying "lush instrumentation heightens the record's overall effect which is one of a fine musical outing." Record World said that "Charlie Calello charts bring Valli back up top 40 mountain." Seasons guitarist Demetri Callas, who had replaced founding member Tommy DeVito in the early 1970s, considered it his favorite record of his work with the Seasons. The song was one of several recorded during a session in which Nick Massi had briefly reunited with the band after a nine-year absence.

The success of "My Eyes Adored You" triggered a revival of interest in recordings by The Four Seasons. The band was subsequently signed to Warner Bros. Records as Valli's follow-up single "Swearin' to God" was climbing to number 6 on the Hot 100.

== Charts ==
=== Weekly charts ===
Chart (1974–1975)	Peak position
Australia (Kent Music Report)	3
Canada Top Singles (RPM)	2
Canada Adult Contemporary (RPM)	3
Ireland (IRMA)	4
New Zealand (Recorded Music NZ)	1
UK Singles (Official Charts)	5
US Billboard Hot 100	1
US Adult Contemporary (Billboard)	2

=== Year-end charts ===
Chart (1975)	Position
Australia (Kent Music Report)	36
Canada Top Singles (RPM)	47
New Zealand (RIANZ)	5
UK Singles (Official Charts Company)	62
US Billboard Hot 100	5

== Certifications ==
Region	Certification	Certified units/sales
New Zealand (RMNZ)	Gold	15,000^{‡}
^{‡} Sales+streaming figures based on certification alone.

== Personnel ==
- Frankie Valli – lead vocals
- Joe Long – vocals, bass guitar
- Demetri Callas – vocals, lead guitar
- Gerry Polci – vocals, drums
- Lee Shapiro – vocals, keyboards
- Charlie Calello – orchestral arrangements
- Nick Massi – vocal arrangements, vocals

== Other versions ==
- Andy Williams included it on his 1975 on his album, The Other Side of Me.
- The song was recorded in 1976 by Fred Astaire with the Pete Moore Orchestra for the album Attitude Dancing (United Artists Records UA-LA580-G).
- Marty Mitchell's 1976 version reached number 87 on the country chart.
- Toni Gonzaga and Sam Milby's 2007 version was the soundtrack of You Got Me! in the Philippines.
