= Having a Party (The Osmonds song) =

Single by the Osmonds

from the album Love Me for a Reason
- B-side: "Wanted"
- Released: 1974
- Recorded: 1974
- Genre: Pop, funk
- Length: 3:20
- Label: MGM
- Songwriter(s): Bobby Massey, H. B. Barnum
- Producer(s): Mike Curb

The Osmonds UK singles chronology
| "Love Me for a Reason" (1974) | "Having a Party" (1974) | "The Proud One" (1975) |

"Having a Party" is a song written by Bobby Massey and H. B. Barnum and originally recorded by the Osmonds. It was included as the opening track on their Love Me for a Reason album.

In the UK and Australia where it was released as a single, it reached No. 28 on the UK Singles Chart and No. 85 on the Australian Singles Chart.

It was used as a theme in the final series of UK Saturday night light entertainment show Noel's House Party in 1998-99.

== Song content ==
The song describes a large but secret house party being thrown while the singers' parents are away, consisting mostly of singing and raucous dancing. At the end, the parents unexpectedly arrive home early, forcing everyone to scramble and leaving a massive mess, even as the hosts promise another party "next week, same place, same time."

Merrill, Jay and Donny Osmond each take turns singing lead vocals on portions of the verses. All five Osmonds sang on the chorus, with Alan and Wayne each singing brief snippets of the last verse.

A promotional music video was shot for the song, featuring a choreographed lip sync routine of the song in front of a blue screen, superimposed over unrelated footage of women dancing.
