= Goin' Home (The Osmonds song) =

Single by The Osmonds

from the album The Plan
- B-side: "Are You Up There?"
- Released: June 2, 1973
- Genre: Pop rock
- Length: 2:29
- Label: MGM Records 14562
- Songwriter(s): Alan Osmond, Merrill Osmond, Wayne Osmond
- Producer(s): Alan Osmond

The Osmonds singles chronology
| "Crazy Horses" (1972) | "Goin' Home" (1973) | "Let Me In" (1973) |

"Goin' Home" is a song written by Alan Osmond, Merrill Osmond, and Wayne Osmond and performed by The Osmonds. It reached #4 on the UK Singles Chart, #30 on the Canadian pop chart, #36 on the Billboard chart, and #91 on Canadian adult contemporary chart in 1973. It was featured on their 1973 album, The Plan.

The song was produced by Alan Osmond. It followed the same basic arrangement as their previous string of rock hits and, like the other songs on The Plan, carried a Mormon undertone ("going home" being a euphemism for heaven, and one point mentioning being a space traveler in a veiled reference to Kolob).

== Certifications ==
| Region | Certification | Certified units/sales |
|---|---|---|
| United Kingdom (BPI) | Silver | 250,000^{^} |
^{^} Shipments figures based on certification alone.
