= Hold Her Tight =

- U.S. 7" single

Single by The Osmonds

from the album Crazy Horses
- B-side: "Love Is"
- Released: June 24, 1972
- Recorded: March 17, 1972
- Genre: Hard rock
- Length: 3:16
- Label: MGM
- Songwriters: Alan Osmond, Wayne Osmond, Merrill Osmond
- Producers: Alan Osmond, Michael Lloyd

The Osmonds singles chronology
"Down by the Lazy River" (1972)	"Hold Her Tight" (1972)	"Crazy Horses" (1972)

"Hold Her Tight" is a song written by Alan Osmond, Wayne Osmond, and Merrill Osmond and released by The Osmonds on June 24, 1972. It was featured on their 1972 album, Crazy Horses. The song reached No. 14 on the Billboard Hot 100 on August 5, 1972. The verses of the song are sung by Merrill and the chorus is sung by the whole group.

Like many of the songs on the Crazy Horses album, this song was inspired by Rock music the Osmonds were hearing from other bands. The song heavily borrows its opening riff from Led Zeppelin's Immigrant Song which was released 2 years earlier.
