= The Four Lovers =

American rhythm and blues band

- Origin: Newark, New Jersey, U.S.
- Genres: Rhythm and blues
- Years active: 1956–1960
- Labels: RCA Victor, Epic
- Past members: Frankie Valli; Tommy DeVito; Frank Cottone (accordion, guitar); Henry Majewski; Nicolas DeVito; Hugh Garrity; Charles Calello; Nick Massi; Bob Gaudio; Phillip Mongiovi

The Four Lovers was a band formed in 1956 which was the result of vocalist Frankie Valli joining The Variatones (first Tommy DeVito, lead guitar; James Gregorio Valeo, then Henry Majewski, rhythm guitar; Frank Cottone, accordion; and Billy Thompson, drums) in 1954. The Four Lovers achieved minor success before a name change to The Four Seasons in 1960. During those five years, the group members also included Nicolas DeVito (vocals, electric bass), Hugh Garrity (vocals, guitar), Charles Calello (bass), Nick Massi (bass, vocals), Bob Gaudio (keyboards, vocals), and Philip Mongiovi (drums).

== History ==
=== RCA Victor, 1956–1958 ===
The Four Lovers' big break came in early 1956 when backing up a female singer's audition for two New York record men. One of the two record men, Peter Paul, was suitably impressed enough to become their manager. A week later, they were themselves auditioning for RCA Victor and were signed that day. The group selected a new name, The Four Lovers. The group consisted of Frankie Valli (lead vocal, drums), Gaetano "Tommy" DeVito (vocal, guitar), Philip Mongiovi (Drums), Henry Majewski (vocal, guitar) and Nicolas DeVito (vocal, bass).

The quartet released seven singles and one album under the Four Lovers name, with only their debut single, Otis Blackwell's "You're the Apple of My Eye" achieving significant national sales to appear on the Billboard Hot 100 singles chart. The single got them their first national television appearance, on The Ed Sullivan Show in 1956.

In 1957, RCA Victor dropped the Four Lovers after the group's fifth straight single failed to chart. They were promptly signed to Epic Records but once again were dropped when their first single for the label also failed to chart. Discouraged, the group temporarily disbanded.

=== Bob Crewe, 1958–1960 ===
At a 1958 recording session, Valli met record producer Bob Crewe, who signed the Four Lovers to a three-year artist contract. The Four Lovers worked steadily as session artists, primarily as background singers and background musicians, in addition to resuming their live performances in various clubs and lounges between New York City and Philadelphia They continued to tour nationwide in small gigs for a short time ending when Tommy DeVito fired his brother Nick and Majewski because, as Tommy DeVito recalled in 2008, they refused to travel to a gig he had booked at which they were to have opened for Tony Bennett. Majewski attributed his departure to creative differences between him and the rest of the group. Two members of the Hollywood Playboys, keyboardist Hugh Garrity and guitarist/arranger Nickie Massey, temporarily filled in, although for part of 1959 Massey left to front his own group and Charles Calello took over his position. At a gig in Baltimore, the group met Bob Gaudio, keyboardist and songwriter for The Royal Teens; when Garrity returned to the Hollywood Playboys, Gaudio agreed to join the band, while Massey (who eventually changed the spelling of his name to "Massi," matching Valli's) abandoned his solo career after one single to rejoin the band permanently in 1960.

In addition, their contract with Crewe allowed them to record individually or collectively for Crewe's Peri Records, as they did under multiple "stage names".

By the end of the contract, the Four Lovers had become a complete outfit with an "in-house" composer (Gaudio) and an associated producer (Crewe) and arranger (Massi). They were no longer dependent on outside songwriters to provide them with hits. In mid-1960, as the contract was expiring, a failed audition at a New Jersey bowling establishment led to a handshake agreement between Valli and Gaudio that signified a change: the Four Lovers were no more, and The Four Seasons Partnership was founded. By the end of 1962, the quartet of Valli, Gaudio, Massi, and Tommy DeVito would have two singles reach the top spot on the Hot 100.

Four Lovers archival material continued to be re-released once the Four Seasons broke through to national fame; Coronet Records released a compilation album featuring Four Lovers material and misrepresented it as containing The Four Seasons, prompting a 1966 lawsuit from Massi (who by then had left the group) and Gaudio, who were not on the recordings being sold but whose images and likeness appeared on the album artwork.

== Discography ==
=== Singles credited to The Four Lovers (1956–1957) ===
1956
"You're the Apple of My Eye"/"The Girl in My Dreams" – RCA Victor
"Honey Love"/"Please Don't Leave Me" – RCA Victor
"Jambalaya (On the Bayou)"/"Be Lovey Dovey" – RCA Victor

1957
"Never Never"/"Happy Am I" – RCA Victor
"Shake a Hand"/"The Stranger" – RCA Victor
"The Stranger"/"Night Train" – RCA Victor
"My Life for your Love"/"Pucker Up" – Epic

=== Singles released under other names (1958–1960) ===
1958
"I Go Ape"/"If You Care" (as Frankie Tyler) – Okeh

1959
"Please Take a Chance"/"It May Be Wrong" (as Frankie Vally) – Decca
"Come Si Bella" (as Franke Valle and the Romans)/"Real (This Is Real)" (as Frankie Valley) – Cindy
"Too Young to Start"/"Red Lips" (as The Village Voices) – Topix/Peri

1960
"Spanish Lace"/"1,000,000 Tears" (Bob Gaudio as Turner Disentri) – Topix/Peri
"I Am All Alone"/"Trance" (as Billy Dixon and The Topics) – Topix/Peri
"An Angel Cried"/"Hope, Faith and Dreams" (as Harold Miller and The Rays) – Topix/Peri
"Lost Lullaby"/"Trance" (as Billy Dixon and The Topics) – Topix/Peri
"Betty Jean"/"More Lovin' Less Talkin'" (as Johnny Halo) – Topix/Peri

=== Albums ===
==== Joyride ====
RCA Victor LPM 1317, released September 1956 (reissued in 1978 as RCA LP 7131). It is a collection of cover versions with a few originals tossed in. A variety of musical styles are represented here, rhythm and blues ("This Is My Story" and "Lawdy Miss Clawdy", the latter a Lloyd Price chestnut), western ("San Antonio Rose", later a hit for Floyd Cramer), pop ("For Sentimental Reasons" and "Memories of You"), and early rock'n'roll (their version of "White Christmas" and "Such a Night", both popularized by The Drifters).

SIDE 1

- "I Want A Girl (Just Like The Girl That Married Dear Old Dad)
- "Such a Night
- "(I Love You) For Sentimental Reasons
- "Joyride
- "This Is My Story
- "Memories of You

SIDE 2

- "It's Too Soon to Know
- "San Antonio Rose
- "White Christmas
- "Night Train
- Cimarron
- "Lawdy Miss Clawdy

==== The Four Lovers ====
Rhino R2 90142 (CD), released July 1993. This is essentially a reissue of a 1989 German compilation album (The Four Lovers 1956) with a few alternate takes thrown in. In addition to the complete contents of the Joyride album and a few songs that were recorded in the Joyride sessions, the CD contains all songs that The Four Lovers released as singles on RCA Victor. Thus it contains the entire Four Lovers output except the two sides on their 1957 Epic single ("My Life for Your Love" and "Pucker Up").

- "What Is This Thing Called Love"
- "Joyride"
- "Such a Night"
- "The Girl in My Dreams"
- "The Stranger"
- "Diddilly Diddilly Babe"
- "Shake a Hand"
- "Please Don't Leave Me"
- "You're the Apple of My Eye"
- "White Christmas"
- "It's Too Soon to Know"
- "San Antonio Rose"
- "Night Train"
- "Cimarron"
- "Lawdy Miss Clawdy"
- "This Is My Story"
- "(I Love You) For Sentimental Reasons"
- "I Want a Girl (Just Like the Girl That Married Dear Old Dad)"
- "Jambalaya (On the Bayou)"
- "Be Lovey Dovey"
- "Love Sweet Love"
- "Happy Am I"
- "Never Never"
- "Honey Love"
- "(I Love You) For Sentimental Reasons (Take 1)"
- "White Christmas (Take 1)"
- "The Girl in My Dreams (Take 4)"
- "Diddilly Diddilly Babe (Take 9)"
- "Such a Night (Take 1)"
- "Honey Love (Take 1)"
