= Let Me In (The Osmonds song) =

Single by The Osmonds

from the album The Plan
- B-side: "One Way Ticket to Anywhere"
- Released: September 1, 1973
- Recorded: March 7, 1973
- Genre: Philadelphia soul; pop rock
- Length: 3:38
- Label: MGM Records 14617
- Songwriters: Alan Osmond, Merrill Osmond, Wayne Osmond
- Producer: Alan Osmond

The Osmonds singles chronology
"Goin' Home" (1973)	"Let Me In" (1973)	"I Can't Stop" (1974)

"Let Me In" is a song written by Alan Osmond, Merrill Osmond, and Wayne Osmond and performed by The Osmonds. It was featured on their 1973 album, The Plan. The song was produced by Alan Osmond.

== Background ==
It broke from the group's string of harder rock-sounding hits through the early 1970s and began a string in which the band began playing up their image as teen idols and began releasing love ballads as singles. As with other songs on The Plan, "Let Me In" carries a dual message of secular and Mormon/Christian themes, both as a straightforward love song and as a plea to God for redemption from the singer's past abandonment of Him and a request to return to His love (akin to the parable of the prodigal son). The song marked the return of the formula of Merrill and Donny Osmond alternating on lead vocals, the formula the band had used while Donny was a boy soprano; by this point, Donny's voice had lowered to the tenor/baritone range he would have in adulthood. Merrill sang on the verses, with Donny (aided by Alan and Wayne in unison) singing the chorus.

== Chart performance ==
In 1973, "Let Me In" reached No. 2 on the UK Singles Chart, #36 on the Billboard chart, No. 4 on the U.S. easy listening chart, No. 5 on Canadian adult contemporary chart, and #15 on the Canadian pop chart.

=== Weekly charts ===
Chart (1973)	Peak position
Australia (Kent Music Report)	65
Canada RPM Adult Contemporary	5
Canada RPM Top Singles	15
Ireland (IRMA)	7
UK Singles (OCC)	2
U.S. Billboard Hot 100	36
U.S. Billboard Adult Contemporary	4
U.S. Cash Box Top 100	24

=== Year-end charts ===
Chart (1973)	Rank
Canada	150
U.S. (Joel Whitburn's Pop Annual)	221

== Other versions ==
- Irish boy band OTT released a version of the song as a single in 1996 that reached No. 2 in Ireland. A reissue in 1997 reached No. 12 on the UK Singles Chart.
