= Sweet and Innocent (Osmonds song) =

Single by Donny Osmond

from the album Osmonds and The Donny Osmond Album
- B-side: "Flirtin'"
- Released: February 27, 1971
- Recorded: November 10, 1970
- Genre: Bubblegum pop
- Length: 3:02
- Label: MGM
- Songwriters: Rick Hall and Billy Sherrill

Donny Osmond singles chronology
"Sweet and Innocent" (1971)	"Go Away Little Girl" (1971)

"Sweet and Innocent" is a song written by Rick Hall and Billy Sherrill, first recorded by Roy Orbison in 1958. It was released as the B-side to the single, "Seems to Me".

== The Osmonds recording ==
In 1970, pop singing group The Osmonds recorded a substantially reworked version of the song with Donny handling the lead vocals, and it was billed as his first solo single release. The lyrics were shifted from Orbison's original words being a compliment to a young woman, to Osmond's remake being repulsed by her behavior. Donny took the song to No. 7 on the Billboard Hot 100 singles chart on June 5, 1971, and number 32 for all of 1971. It was certified Gold by the RIAA on August 30, 1971.

== Charts ==
Chart (1971)	Peak position
Canada Top Singles (RPM)	3
US Billboard Hot 100	7

== Certifications ==
Region	Certification	Certified units/sales
United States (RIAA)	Gold	1,000,000^{^}
^{^} Shipments figures based on certification alone.
