= The Proud One (album) =

1975 studio album by The Osmonds

Studio album by The Osmonds
- Released: August 30, 1975
- Recorded: November 11 – December 28, 1974
- Studios: Kolob Studios (Provo, Utah); MGM Recording Studios (Hollywood, Los Angeles)
- Genre: Pop
- Length: 33:01
- Labels: Kolob; MGM
- Producers: The Osmonds (exec.); Mike Curb; Alan Osmond; Michael Lloyd

The Osmonds chronology
Love Me for a Reason (1974)	The Proud One (1975)	Brainstorm (1976)

Singles from The Proud One
- 1. "The Proud One" Released: May 24, 1975; 2. "I'm Still Gonna Need You" Released: November 1, 1975

Professional ratings
Review scores
Source	Rating
AllMusic	2.5/5 stars

The Proud One is the twelfth studio album released by The Osmonds in 1975 released by Kolob Records distributed by MGM Records. It was their last to be released on MGM Records before moving to Polydor Records the following year. Two singles, "The Proud One" and "I'm Still Gonna Need You" were released from the album. The album peaked at No. 160 on the Billboard Top LPs chart, a precipitous drop from their previous albums.

The title track gave the quintet its last top 40 hit in the US to date as well as its first and only number-one on the easy listening charts. "I'm Still Gonna Need You" did not make the Billboard Hot 100 but did make the top 40 in the UK and appeared on the easy listening charts.

The UK version of the album, released with the same tracks but under the title I'm Still Gonna Need You, reached No. 19 on the UK Albums Chart, their last studio album to make an appearance on the chart.

== Track listing ==
No.	Title	Recorded	Length
1.	"I'm Still Gonna Need You"	November 25, 1974	3:14
2.	"Where Would I Be Without You"	November 11, 1974	3:42
3.	"Kind of Woman That a Man Wants"	December 28, 1974	2:24
4.	"Thank You"	December 28, 1974	3:44
5.	"Someone to Go Home To"	November 25, 1974	2:55
6.	"Take Love If You Ever Find Love"	November 25, 1974	2:30
7.	"The Proud One"	November 11, 1974	3:06
8.	"Frightened Eyes"	December 28, 1974	3:12
9.	"The Last Day Is Coming"		3:27
10.	"Where Are You Going to My Love"	November 11, 1974	3:14

== Charts ==
Chart (1975)	Peak position
Canadian Albums (RPM)	89
UK Albums (OCC)	19
US Billboard 200	160

== Certifications ==
Country	Certification	Sales
UK	Silver	60,000
