= Phase III (album) =

1972 studio album by The Osmonds

Studio album by The Osmonds
- Released: January 1972
- Recorded: June 21 – September 25, 1971
- Genres: Soul; rock
- Label: MGM
- Producers: Alan Osmond, Michael Lloyd, Rick Hall, Mike Curb, Ray Ruff, Don Costa

The Osmonds chronology
Homemade (1971)	Phase III (1972)	The Osmonds Live (1972)

Singles from Phase III
- 1. "Yo-Yo" Released: September 4, 1971; 2. "Down by the Lazy River" Released: January 15, 1972

Professional ratings
Review scores
Source	Rating
AllMusic	3.5/5 stars
Christgau's Record Guide	B

Phase III is the eighth studio album by the American singing group The Osmonds, released in 1972. The album entered the Billboard Top LPs chart on January 29, and reached number ten on March 11. Two singles released from the album, "Yo-Yo" and "Down by the Lazy River", reached No. 3 and No. 4 on the Billboard Hot 100 singles chart, respectively. The album was certified Gold by the RIAA on May 29, 1972.

Phase III was, as its name implied, a shift in direction for the band, after its 1960s era as variety-show child stars and the band's early breakthrough as bubblegum pop idols, much of this album featured the band moving into a hard rock sound and writing more of their own material. According to Wayne Osmond, the family was being pitched several songs that did not meet their moral standards at the time and thus decided to start writing their own. Mike Curb brought on a young producer named Michael Lloyd, who had just scored a hit with "A Natural Man" for Lou Rawls, to produce the new effort; Lloyd would also produce their subsequent rock album Crazy Horses.

== Track listing ==
No.	Title	Writer(s)	Recorded	Length
1.	"Down by the Lazy River"	Alan Osmond, Merrill Osmond	July 29, 1971	2:37
2.	"Business"	Alan Osmond, Merrill Osmond, Wayne Osmond	September 20, 1971	3:01
3.	"Love Is"	Alan Osmond, Merrill Osmond, Wayne Osmond	September 25, 1971	2:20
4.	"A Taste of Rhythm and Blues"	Terry Thompson	June 21, 1971	2:52
5.	"Yo-Yo"	Joe South	June 21, 1971	3:13
6.	"He's the Light of the World"	Helen Lewis, Kay Lewis		2:22
7.	"My Drum"	Alan Osmond, Jay Osmond, Merrill Osmond	September 25, 1971	3:18
8.	"It's You Babe"	Alan Osmond		3:25
9.	"In the Rest of My Life"	Doug Thaler		3:12
10.	"Don't Panic"	Alan Osmond, Merrill Osmond, Wayne Osmond	July 29, 1971	3:43

== Personnel ==
- Producer: Alan Osmond, Michael Lloyd (Tracks 1–3, 7–8, 10)
- Producer: Rick Hall (Track 4–5)
- Producer: Alan Osmond, Mike Curb, Ray Ruff (Track 6)
- Producer: Alan Osmond, Don Costa, Mike Curb (Track 9)

== Charts ==
=== Album ===
Chart (1972)	Peak position
Australian Albums (Kent Music Report)	38
Canadian Albums (RPM)	6
Japanese Albums (Oricon)	75
US Billboard 200	10

=== Singles ===
Year	Single	Chart	Position
1971	"Yo-Yo"	Billboard Hot 100	3
1971	"Yo-Yo"	Canada	1
1971	"Yo-Yo"	Australia	1
1972	"Down by the Lazy River"	Billboard Hot 100	4
1972	"Down by the Lazy River"	Canada	1
1972	"Down by the Lazy River"	United Kingdom	40
1972	"Down by the Lazy River"	Australia	33

== Certifications ==
Region	Certification	Certified units/sales
United States (RIAA)	Gold	500,000^{^}
^{^} Shipments figures based on certification alone.
