= Yo-Yo (Billy Joe Royal song) =

1966 single by Billy Joe Royal

Single by Billy Joe Royal
- B-side: "We Tried"
- Released: November 3, 1966
- Recorded: 1966
- Genre: Soul
- Length: 2:30
- Label: Columbia
- Songwriter: Joe South
- Producer: Joe South

Billy Joe Royal singles chronology
"Campfire Girls" (1966)	"Yo-Yo" (1966)	"These Are Not My People" (1967)

"Yo-Yo" is a song by American singer Billy Joe Royal. It was released on November 3, 1966 through Columbia Records, peaking at #117 on the Billboard Hot 100 chart, and #28 in Canada. The song was written and produced by Joe South. The Osmonds covered the song and released it as a single on September 4, 1971.

It reached #3 on the Billboard Hot 100 on October 16, 1971. The song was included on the Osmonds' 1972 album, Phase III. It was certified Gold by the RIAA on November 17, 1971. Joe South also recorded his own version for his self-titled 1971 album.

== Charts ==
Chart (1966–1967)	Peak position
Canadian RPM Top Singles	28

== The Osmonds version ==
"Yo-Yo"
- U.S. 7" single

Single by The Osmonds

from the album Phase III
- B-side: "Keep on My Side"
- Released: September 4, 1971
- Recorded: June 21, 1971
- Length: 3:11
- Label: MGM
- Songwriter: Joe South
- Producer: Rick Hall

The Osmonds singles chronology
"Double Lovin'" (1971)	"Yo-Yo" (1971)	"Down by the Lazy River" (1972)

=== Charts ===
The Osmonds version

Chart (1971)	Peak position
US Billboard Hot 100	3
Australian Kent Music Report	87
Canadian RPM Top Singles	1

=== Certifications ===
Region	Certification	Certified units/sales
United States (RIAA)	Gold	1,000,000^{^}
^{^} Shipments figures based on certification alone.
