= Crazy Horses =

Single by The Osmonds

from the album Crazy Horses
- B-side: "That's My Girl"
- Released: October 14, 1972
- Recorded: June 23, 1972
- Genre: Hard rock; heavy metal; glam rock
- Length: 2:40
- Label: MGM
- Songwriters: Alan Osmond; Merrill Osmond; Wayne Osmond
- Producers: Alan Osmond; Michael Lloyd

The Osmonds singles chronology
"Hold Her Tight" (1972)	"Crazy Horses" (1972)	"Goin' Home" (1973)

"Crazy Horses" is a song by the Osmonds from the album Crazy Horses. It was released as the album's second single and reached number 14 on the US Billboard Hot 100 and number 2 on the UK Singles Chart. The song is the only hit record from the Osmonds to feature Jay Osmond as lead vocalist. It has since been covered by numerous other performers.

== Recording and content ==
Singer Merrill Osmond said of the song, "Before that, my brothers and I had been what's now called a boy band: all our songs were chosen for us by the record company. But now, having been successful, we wanted to freak out and make our own music. We were rehearsing in a basement one day when Wayne started playing this heavy rock riff. I came up with a melody and Alan got the chords. Within an hour, we had the song. I had always been the lead singer, but I sang Crazy Horses with Jay. The line "What a show, there they go, smoking up the sky" had to be sung higher, so I did that and Jay did the verses because his voice was growlier, and this track was heavier than anything we'd ever done." Merrill Osmond also added that the record company initially was skeptical the song would be successful but relented when it performed well in the charts (particularly in the United Kingdom, where the song proved to be a breakthrough for the quintet, as well as much of the rest of Europe). "Crazy Horses" also helped open up the band to a male audience that had largely ignored the group until then; Alan once recalled touring to promote the song and, instead of being greeted by screaming girls hoping to hear Donny's teen idol songs, found themselves in front of a raucous crowd of boys and young men, prompting Alan to turn to the rest of the band and tell them, "Cut 'Puppy Love!'"

Jay Osmond said:

The song was recorded at MGM in Hollywood and we added that distinctive "Wah! Wah!" intro sound afterwards. Alan had written the lyrics, which talked about horsepower, and he said: "It's got to sound like a horse somehow". We tried everything, then finally found something on Donny's organ that sounded like a neighing stallion.

Concerning the opening part of the song, Donny said:

It wasn't [a] theremin, it was a Y[C]-30 Yamaha organ with a portamento slide. We had a wall of Marshalls in the studio. It was so loud that you couldn't even walk in the studio, so we had to play the organ from the control room. My brother Alan actually played it on the record. I played it live. But the secret to it was a wah-wah pedal. We opened the wah-wah just enough to get that really harsh kind of a piercing sound, but it was the loudness of the Marshalls that got us that sound. And then we doubled it. That was the secret to that sound.

Donny, the usual co-lead, had no vocal parts because his voice was changing, due to puberty. The record was co-produced by Alan Osmond and Michael Lloyd, who had previously been in the psychedelic rock group The West Coast Pop Art Experimental Band.

Jay Osmond said, "'Crazy Horses' was way ahead of its time. It's a song about ecology and the environment: those 'crazy horses, smoking up the sky' are gas-guzzling cars, destroying the planet with their fumes. We shot the record sleeve in a junkyard, surrounded by big old cars."

During some of the live performances, as Jay stepped out front to sing lead, Merrill played the drums while Alan played bass guitar.

=== Censorship ===
Sales of the song were prohibited in South Africa, where government censors interpreted the word 'horses' as referring to heroin. The song was also initially banned in France when authorities believed the lyric "smoking up the sky" was about drugs. The censorship amused Wayne Osmond, especially in light of the band's rejection of drug and alcohol use for religious reasons.

=== Appreciation ===
According to Donny, Ozzy Osbourne once told him that "Crazy Horses" was "one of his favorite rock and roll songs." Alan considered it to be his favorite song to perform, as did Merrill.

=== Tracklist ===
Dave Aude Remixes

1. "Crazy Horses" (Dave Aude Future Rave Remix) - 2:31
2. "Crazy Horses" (Dave Aude Remix) - 3:12
3. "Crazy Horses" (Dave Aude Future Rave Extended Remix) - 3:48
4. "Crazy Horses" (Dave Aude Extended Remix) - 4:11

== Charts ==
Chart (1972–1973)	Peak position
Belgian Singles Chart (Flanders)	1
Canadian RPM Top Singles	12
Dutch Top 40	1
Netherlands (Single Top 100)	1
France (IFOP)	1
Irish Singles Chart	17
Swiss Singles Chart	5
UK Singles Chart	2
US Billboard Hot 100	14

== Cover versions ==
It has been covered by numerous other artists. Westlife covered the song live in 2003, and even performed the song alongside Donny Osmond. Donny recorded the song and released it as a hidden track on his 2002 covers album Somewhere in Time.

In 1995, the electronic music group Utah Saints released a remixed version of the song, which reached number 50 on the UK Singles Chart. This version was reissued in 1999 and peaked at number 34.

The Dictators released a cover version in 2023.
