= Down by the Lazy River =

- U.S. 7" single

Single by The Osmonds

from the album Phase III
- B-side: "He's the Light of the World"
- Released: January 15, 1972
- Recorded: July 29, 1971
- Length: 2:37
- Label: MGM
- Songwriters: Alan Osmond, Merrill Osmond
- Producers: Alan Osmond, Michael Lloyd

The Osmonds singles chronology
| "Yo-Yo" (1971) | "Down by the Lazy River" (1972) | "Hold Her Tight" (1972) |

"Down by the Lazy River" is a song written by Alan and Merrill Osmond and performed by The Osmonds, it was produced by Alan Osmond and Michael Lloyd. "Down By the Lazy River" was released on January 15, 1972 and appeared on the band's 1972 album, Phase III. It was certified Gold by the RIAA on March 24, 1972.

== Charts ==
=== Weekly charts ===
| Chart (1972) | Peak position |
|---|---|
| Canada RPM 100 | 1 |
| France (IFOP) | 21 |
| Netherlands (Dutch Top 40) | 1 |
| UK Singles Chart | 40 |
| U.S. Billboard Hot 100 | 4 |
| U.S. Cash Box Top 100 | 3 |

=== Year-end charts ===
| Chart (1972) | Rank |
|---|---|
| Canada | 50 |
| U.S. Billboard Hot 100 | 36 |
| U.S. Cash Box | 30 |

The song reached No. 4 on the Billboard Hot 100 on March 4, 1972, and spent two weeks at No. 3 on the Cash Box Top 100. It also reached No. 40 on the UK Singles Chart in 1972. The song reached No. 1 for two weeks in both the Netherlands and Canada. The song was ranked No. 36 on Billboard magazine's Top Hot 100 songs of 1972. Cash Box had it at No. 30 for the year. The song, like almost all of the Osmonds' discography, was largely left out of recurrent rotation as radio stations no longer play the record; of all of the Osmonds' songs, "Down by the Lazy River" fared the worst relative to its popularity at the time.

== Certifications ==
| Region | Certification | Certified units/sales |
|---|---|---|
| United States (RIAA) | Gold | 1,000,000^{^} |
^{^} Shipments figures based on certification alone.
