= The Proud One (song) =

Single by The Osmonds

from the album The Proud One
- B-side: "The Last Day Is Coming"
- Released: May 24, 1975
- Recorded: November 11, 1974
- Genre: Pop rock
- Length: 3:02
- Label: MGM 14791
- Songwriters: Bob Gaudio, Bob Crewe
- Producer: Mike Curb

The Osmonds singles chronology
"Having a Party" (1975)	"The Proud One" (1975)	"I'm Still Gonna Need You" (1975)

"The Proud One" is a 1966 song written by Bob Gaudio and Bob Crewe and originally performed by Frankie Valli as part of his debut solo album, The 4 Seasons Present Frankie Valli Solo. A minor hit for Valli, it became a top-40 hit (and easy listening chart-topper) for The Osmonds with their 1975 cover version of the record.

== Frankie Valli version ==
=== Background ===
"The Proud One" was the first single released in an effort to relaunch Valli's solo career as a side project from The 4 Seasons. (Valli had briefly been a solo artist in the 1950s, most successfully with the minor hit "My Mother's Eyes," before joining The Four Lovers, the group Valli fronted before the formation of The 4 Seasons.) Valli and Gaudio had originally planned on releasing "Can't Take My Eyes Off You" as the lead-off single from the new project, but reluctance on the part of the Seasons' label Philips Records (stemming from concerns about the band's stability after Nick Massi's 1965 resignation) prompted them to release "The Proud One," a record more in line with the Seasons' established stylings and sound, as the lead-off single.

=== Chart performance ===
Valli's version, which featured the Seasons on instrumental backing but not vocals, peaked at #68 in the U.S. and #64 in Canada.

=== Reception ===
Billboard claimed that "the electric sound of Valli is used to perfection in this powerful ballad, stating that the "easy-go dance beat [is] effective." Cash Box said that it is a "powerhouse" and that "the Valli sound holds the moving, teen-oriented tale of love together and the sweeping arrangement adds a must spin again quality to it."

== The Osmonds cover ==
The Osmonds recorded the song and released it in the spring of 1975. It was their final appearance in the US Top 40, peaking at number 22 on the Billboard Hot 100, and their only number one on the Easy Listening chart, where it spent one week at number one in September 1975. The song also reached number one in Ireland.

== Chart history ==
=== Weekly charts ===
Chart (1975)	Peak position
Canada RPM Top Singles	25
Canada RPM Adult Contemporary	4
Irish Singles Chart	1
New Zealand (RIANZ)	17
UK Singles Chart	5
US Billboard Hot 100	22
US Billboard Easy Listening	1
US Cash Box Top 100	33

=== Year-end charts ===
Chart (1975)	Rank
Canada RPM Top Singles	190
UK	75
US Billboard Easy Listening	46
US (Joel Whitburn's Pop Annual)	174

== See also ==
- List of number-one adult contemporary singles of 1975 (U.S.)
