= One Bad Apple =

Single by the Osmonds

from the album Osmonds
- B-side: "He Ain't Heavy, He's My Brother"
- Released: November 14, 1970
- Recorded: October 26, 1970
- Studio: FAME Studios (Muscle Shoals, Alabama)
- Genre: Bubblegum; pop; teen pop; pop rock; pop soul; country pop
- Length: 2:45
- Label: MGM
- Songwriter: George Jackson
- Producer: Rick Hall

The Osmonds singles chronology
"I've Got Loving on My Mind" (1970)	"One Bad Apple" (1970)	"Double Lovin'" (1971)

"One Bad Apple" is a song by the Osmonds, released as a single on November 14, 1970. It debuted on the Billboard Hot 100 on January 2, 1971. It hit the top of the chart on February 13, 1971 and stayed there for five weeks. It also reached No. 6 on the R&B chart. Billboard ranked it as the No. 4 song for 1971. Both "One Bad Apple" and the Donny Osmond-credited single "Sweet and Innocent" are on the 1970 album Osmonds. It was certified Gold by the RIAA on February 4, 1971.

The song was written by George Jackson, who originally had the Jackson 5 in mind when he wrote it. According to Donny Osmond, Michael Jackson later told him that the Jackson 5 almost recorded this song first, but chose to record "ABC" instead. Rick Hall recorded and produced the song at his FAME Studios in Muscle Shoals; to determine who would sing lead, he lined up all of the brothers (including Jimmy) and had each one sing the opening line, choosing Merrill and Donny. Ultimately, songs led primarily by Merrill would be released as being by the Osmonds, while those by Donny would be released under Donny's name (with the brothers still accompanying him). MGM Records head Mike Curb then brought it to Terry Manning in Memphis to mix.

"One Bad Apple" was also used as the theme to The Osmonds cartoon show on ABC-TV.

Aaron Carter covered the song for his self-titled debut album in 1997.

== Charts ==
=== Weekly charts ===
Weekly chart performance for "One Bad Apple"
Chart (1970–1971)	Peak position
Australia KMR	35
Canada RPM Top Singles	1
New Zealand (Listener)	17
UK (Melody Maker)	38
US Billboard Hot 100	1
US Billboard R&B/Soul	6
US Billboard Adult Contemporary	37
US Cash Box Top 100	1

1988 weekly chart performance for "One Bad Apple"
Chart (1988)	Peak position
UK	89

=== Year-end charts ===
Year-end chart performance for "One Bad Apple"
Chart (1971)	Rank
Canada	20
US Billboard Hot 100	4
US R&B/Soul (Billboard)	48
US Cash Box Top 100	9

== Certifications ==
Certifications for "One Bad Apple"
Region	Certification	Certified units/sales
United States (RIAA)	Gold	1,000,000^{^}
^{^} Shipments figures based on certification alone.
