= The 5th Dimension discography =

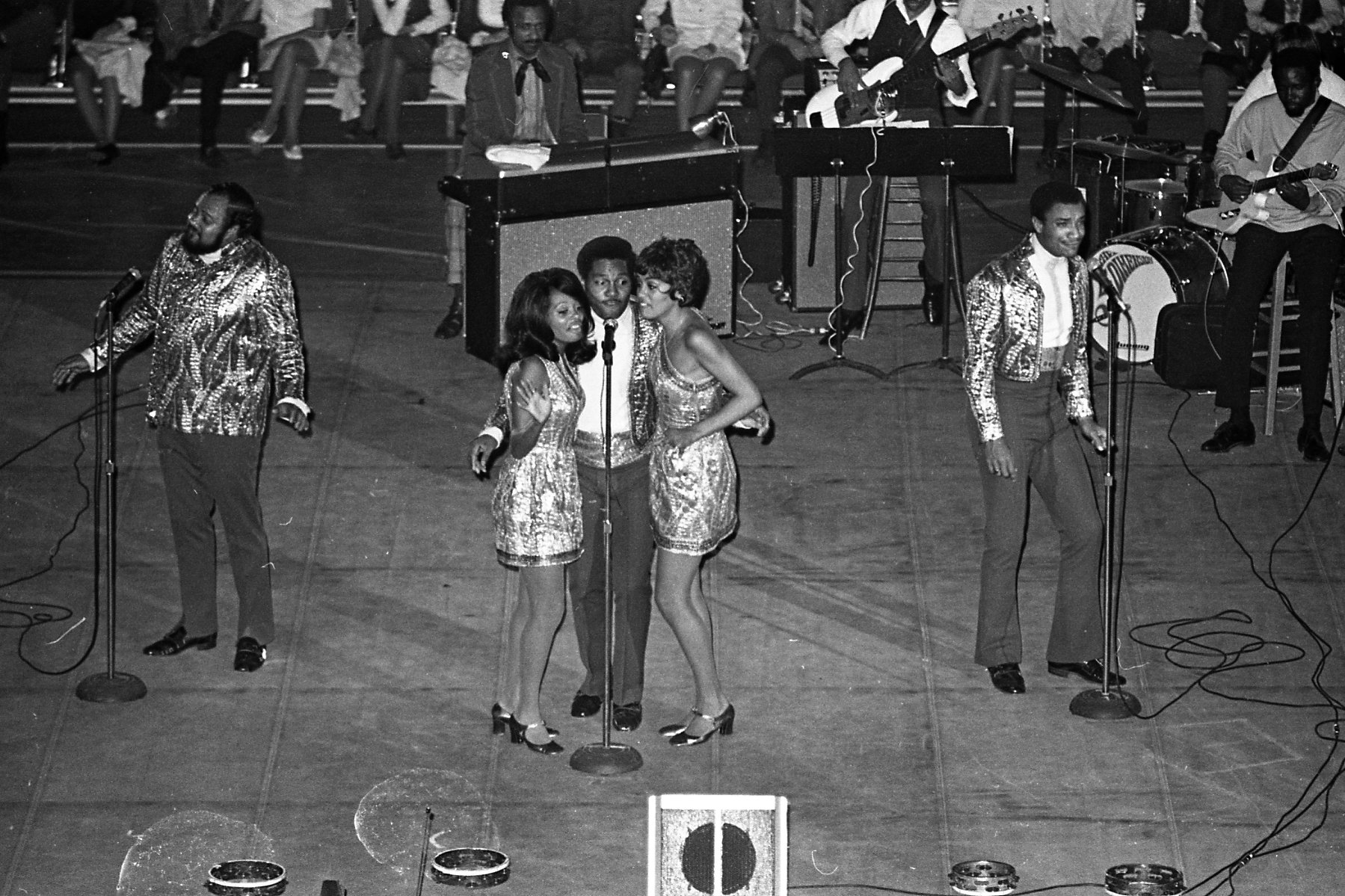
- The group performing in 1970
- Studio albums: 13
- Live albums: 2
- Compilation albums: 18
- Singles: 44

This is a discography of The 5th Dimension music group.

== Albums ==
=== Studio albums ===
Title	Album details	Peak chart positions				Certifications
Title	Album details	US	US R&B	CAN	GER	Certifications
Up – Up and Away	Released: May 1967; Label: Soul City; Formats: LP, 8-track, reel-to-reel	8	10	6	—	US: Gold
The Magic Garden	Released: December 1967; Label: Soul City; Formats: LP, MC, 8-track	105	43	—	—	
Stoned Soul Picnic	Released: August 1968; Label: Soul City; Formats: LP, MC, 8-track, reel-to-reel	21	10	28	—	
The Age of Aquarius	Released: May 1969; Label: Soul City; Formats: LP, MC, 4-track, 8-track, reel-to-reel	2	2	2	4	US: Gold
Portrait	Released: April 1970; Label: Bell; Formats: LP, MC, 8-track, reel-to-reel	20	6	30	—	US: Gold
Love's Lines, Angles and Rhymes	Released: February 1971; Label: Bell; Formats: LP, MC, 8-track, reel-to-reel	17	10	14	—	US: Gold
Individually & Collectively	Released: March 1972; Label: Bell; Formats: LP, MC, 8-track, reel-to-reel	58	21	—	—	
Living Together, Growing Together	Released: March 1973; Label: Bell; Formats: LP, MC, 8-track, reel-to-reel	108	25	77	—	
Soul & Inspiration	Released: October 1974; Label: Bell; Formats: LP, MC, 8-track, reel-to-reel	—	55	—	—	
Earthbound	Released: August 1975; Label: ABC; Formats: LP, MC, 8-track	136	30	—	—	
Star Dancing	Released: January 1978; Label: Motown; Formats: LP, MC, 8-track	—	—	—	—	
High on Sunshine	Released: January 1979; Label: Motown; Formats: LP, MC, 8-track	—	—	—	—	
In the House	Released: March 20, 1995; Label: Columbia; Formats: CD, MC	—	—	—	—	
"—" denotes a recording that did not chart or was not released in that territory.

=== Live albums ===
Title	Album details	Peak chart positions			Certifications
Title	Album details	US	US R&B	CAN	Certifications
The 5th Dimension / Live!!	Released: October 1971; Label: Bell; Formats: 2xLP, MC, 8-track, reel-to-reel	32	13	26	US: Gold
Respect – Live	Released: 1995; Label: Success; Formats: CD; Reissued in 2005 as Live! Plus Other Rare Studio Recordings	—	—	—	
"—" denotes a recording that did not chart or was not released in that territory.

=== Compilation albums ===
Title	Album details	Peak chart positions				Certifications
Title	Album details	US	US R&B	CAN	GER	Certifications
The Fantastic 5th Dimension	Released: 1969; Label: Liberty; Formats: LP	—	—	—	3	
Greatest Hits	Released: May 16, 1970; Label: Soul City; Formats: LP, MC, 8-track, reel-to-reel	5	8	3	—	US: Gold
The July 5th Album – More Hits by the Fabulous 5th Dimension	Released: August 1970; Label: Soul City; Formats: LP, MC, 8-track	63	—	43	—	
Reflections	Released: October 1971; Label: Bell; Formats: LP, MC, 8-track	112	—	—	—	
Greatest Hits on Earth	Released: August 1972; Label: Soul City; Formats: LP, MC, 8-track, reel-to-reel	14	10	17	—	US: Gold
22 of Their Fabulous Hits	Released: 1976; Label: Bell; Formats: 2xLP, MC, 8-track	—	—	—	—	
The Very Best of 5th Dimension	Released: February 1982; Label: Warwick; Formats: LP, MC; UK-only release	—	—	—	—	
Anthology 1967–1973	Released: June 1986; Label: Rhino; Formats: 2xLP, MC	—	—	—	—	
Up-Up and Away – The Definitive Collection	Released: May 20, 1997; Label: Arista; Formats: 2xCD	—	—	—	—	
The Very Best of the 5th Dimension	Released: July 12, 1999; Label: Camden; Formats: CD	—	—	—	—	
Up-Up and Away – The Encore Collection	Released: August 3, 1999; Label: BMG/Arista; Formats: CD, MC	—	—	—	—	
36 All-Time Greatest Hits	Released: 1999; Label: GSC Music/BMG; Formats: 3xCD	—	—	—	—	
The Ultimate 5th Dimension	Released: January 27, 2004; Label: Arista/BMG Heritage; Formats: CD	—	—	—	—	
Collections	Released: May 2006; Label: Sony BMG; Formats: CD	—	—	—	—	
Super Hits	Released: August 28, 2007; Label: Sony BMG; Formats: CD	—	—	—	—	
The Essential 5th Dimension	Released: March 15, 2011; Label: Arista/Legacy; Formats: 2xCD	—	—	—	—	
Playlist – The Very Best of the 5th Dimension	Released: May 27, 2014; Label: Bell/Arista/Legacy; Formats: CD	—	—	—	—	
The Complete Soul City/Bell Singles 1966–1975	Released: December 23, 2016; Label: Real Gone Music; Formats: 3xCD	—	—	—	—	
"—" denotes a recording that did not chart or was not released in that territory.

== Singles ==
Title	Year	Peak chart positions									Certifications	Album
Title	Year	US	US AC	US R&B	AUS	CAN	GER	NZ	SWI	UK	Certifications	Album
"You're Good Enough for Me" (as the Versatiles) b/w "Bye Bye Baby"	1966	—	—	—	—	—	—	—	—	—		Non-album singles
"I'll Be Lovin' You Forever" b/w "Train, Keep On Movin'"	1966	—	—	—	—	—	—	—	—	—		Non-album singles
"Go Where You Wanna Go" b/w "Too Poor to Die" (Non-album track)	1966	16	—	—	75	18	—	—	—	—		Up – Up and Away
"Another Day, Another Heartache" b/w "Rosecrans Blvd."	1967	45	—	—	—	41	—	—	—	—		Up – Up and Away
"Up – Up and Away" b/w "Which Way to Nowhere" (from Up – Up and Away)	1967	7	9	—	1	1	—	9	—	—	US: Platinum	Up – Up and Away
"Paper Cup" b/w "Poor Side of Town"	1967	34	—	—	47	10	—	—	—	—		The Magic Garden
"Carpet Man" b/w "The Magic Garden"	1968	29	—	—	94	11	—	—	—	—		The Magic Garden
"Ticket to Ride" (UK-only release) b/w "Orange Air"	1968	—	—	—	—	—	—	—	—	—		The Magic Garden
"Stoned Soul Picnic" b/w "The Sailboat Song"	1968	3	—	2	—	3	—	—	—	—	US: Platinum	Stoned Soul Picnic
"Sweet Blindness" b/w "Bobbie's Blues (Who Do You Think Of?)"	1968	13	—	45	19	6	—	10	—	—		Stoned Soul Picnic
"Good News" (UK-only release) b/w "Sweet Blindness"	1968	—	—	—	—	—	—	—	—	—		Stoned Soul Picnic
"California Soul" b/w "It'll Never Be the Same Again"	1968	25	—	49	—	22	—	—	—	—		Stoned Soul Picnic
"Medley: Aquarius/Let the Sunshine In (The Flesh Failures)" b/w "Don'tcha Hear Me Callin' to Ya"	1969	1	1	6	4	1	2	6	4	11	US: Platinum	The Age of Aquarius
"Workin' on a Groovy Thing" b/w "Broken Wing Bird" (from Stoned Soul Picnic)	1969	20	9	15	48	18	—	—	—	—		The Age of Aquarius
"Sunshine of Your Love" (UK and Europe-only release) b/w "Workin' on a Groovy Thing"	1969	—	—	—	—	—	33	—	—	—		The Age of Aquarius
"Wedding Bell Blues" b/w "Lovin' Stew" (from Stoned Soul Picnic)	1969	1	1	23	20	1	—	3	—	16	US: Platinum	The Age of Aquarius
"Blowing Away" b/w "Skinny Man"	1969	21	7	—	55	10	—	18	—	—		The Age of Aquarius
"The Declaration" b/w "Medley: A Change Is Gonna Come/People Gotta Be Free"	1970	60	35	—	—	67	—	—	—	—		Portrait
"The Girls' Song" b/w "It'll Never Be the Same Again" (from Stoned Soul Picnic)	1970	43	6	—	97	45	—	—	—	—		Greatest Hits
"Puppet Man" b/w "A Love Like Ours"	1970	24	31	—	19	31	—	—	—	—		Portrait
"Save the Country" b/w "Dimension 5"	1970	27	10	41	79	17	—	—	—	—		Portrait
"On the Beach (In the Summertime)" b/w "This Is Your Life" (from Portrait)	1970	54	12	—	—	29	—	—	—	—		Non-album single
"One Less Bell to Answer" b/w "Feelin' Alright?"	1970	2	1	4	—	11	—	—	—	—	US: Platinum	Portrait
"Love's Lines, Angles and Rhymes" b/w "The Singer"	1971	19	6	28	—	18	—	—	—	—		Love's Lines, Angles and Rhymes
"Light Sings" b/w "Viva! (Viva Tirado)"	1971	44	12	—	—	22	—	—	—	—		Love's Lines, Angles and Rhymes
"The Rainmaker" (New Zealand-only release) b/w "Puppet Man" (from Portrait)	1971	—	—	—	—	—	—	7	—	—		Love's Lines, Angles and Rhymes
"Never My Love" b/w "A Love Like Ours" (from Portrait)	1971	12	1	45	85	9	—	—	—	—		Live!!
"Shake Your Tambourine" (France-only release) b/w "I Just Wanta Be Your Friend"	1971	—	—	—	—	—	—	—	—	—		Live!!
"Together Let's Find Love" b/w "I Just Wanta Be Your Friend"	1971	37	8	22	—	19	—	—	—	—		Live!!
"(Last Night) I Didn't Get to Sleep at All" b/w "The River Witch" (from Living Together, Growing Together)	1972	8	2	28	7	6	—	—	—	—	US: Platinum	Individually & Collectively
"If I Could Reach You" b/w "Tomorrow Belongs to the Children"	1972	10	1	—	—	8	—	—	—	—		Individually & Collectively
"Living Together, Growing Together" b/w "What Do I Need to Be Me"	1972	32	5	—	—	24	—	—	—	—		Living Together, Growing Together
"Everything's Been Changed" b/w "There Never Was a Day"	1973	70	18	—	—	49	—	—	—	—		Living Together, Growing Together
"Ashes to Ashes" b/w "The Singer" (from Love's Lines, Angles and Rhymes)	1973	52	7	54	—	50	—	—	—	—		Living Together, Growing Together
"Flashback" b/w "Diggin' for a Livin'"	1973	82	30	75	60	94	—	—	—	—		Non-album single
"Harlem" b/w "My Song"	1974	—	—	87	—	—	—	—	—	—		Soul & Inspiration
"No Love in the Room" b/w "I Don't Know How to Look for Love"	1975	105	11	—	—	—	—	—	—	—		Soul & Inspiration
"Magic in My Life" b/w "Lean on Me Always"	1975	—	—	—	—	—	—	—	—	—		Earthbound
"Walk Your Feet in the Sunshine" b/w "Speaking with My Heart"	1975	—	—	—	—	—	—	—	—	—		Earthbound
"Love Hangover" b/w "Will You Be There"	1976	80	—	39	—	—	—	—	—	—		Non-album single
"You Are the Reason (I Feel Like Dancing)" b/w "Slipping into Something New"	1978	—	—	66	—	—	—	—	—	—		Star Dancing
"Star Dancing" (Australia-only release) b/w "Slipping Into Something New"	1978	—	—	—	—	—	—	—	—	—		Star Dancing
"Everybody's Got to Give It Up" b/w "You're My Star"	1978	—	—	—	—	—	—	—	—	—		High On Sunshine
"Surrender" b/w "Fantasy"	1983	—	—	—	—	—	—	—	—	—		Non-album single
"—" denotes a recording that did not chart or was not released in that territory.
