= Greatest Hits (The 5th Dimension album) =

Greatest hits album by the 5th Dimension
- Released: May 16, 1970
- Label: Soul City
- Producer: Bones Howe

The 5th Dimension chronology
The Age of Aquarius (1969)	Greatest Hits (1970)	Portrait (1970)

Greatest Hits is the first compilation album by American Pop group The 5th Dimension, released in 1970 by Soul City. It includes all but two of their charting singles to date: "Go Where You Wanna Go", their first Top 20 record in the USA, would appear on the follow-up compilation, The July 5th Album, released later that year, while "Another Day, Another Heartache" was not included on either compilation. Greatest Hits and The July 5 Album were the final two album releases for Soul City Records' distribution deal with Liberty Records. The 5th Dimension subsequently signed with Bell Records. The album peaked at no. 5 on Billboard's Top LP's chart in the summer of 1970, achieving gold record status.

Greatest Hits remained in print until replaced by Bell Records' 1972 compilation album, Greatest Hits on Earth which confirmed The 5th Dimension's enduring popularity by charting at no. 14 in the year of its release. Greatest Hits on Earth remained in print for decades.

Of note:

- The version of "Aquarius/Let the Sunshine In" included here is a shortened version of the 4:49 single release which ranked no. 2 in Billboard's listing of top Hot 100 singles of 1969. It omits the reprise of the first verse. The album cover makes no mention of this being a shortened version of the hit.
- "The Worst That Could Happen" was not a hit for The 5th Dimension, as it was not released as a single. Johnny Maestro & The Brooklyn Bridge had a hit with the song in early 1969. However, The 5th Dimension's version came first, released on their album entitled The Magic Garden.
- "The Girls' Song" is the 5th Dimension's final single release on Soul City and was issued specifically to coincide with this album. Originally appearing on The Magic Garden, the single was the band's least successful in three years, due in part to competing with Bell Records' release of new material.

== Track listing ==
Side One

1. "Aquarius/Let the Sunshine In"
2. "The Girls' Song"
3. "Stoned Soul Picnic"
4. "The Worst That Could Happen"
5. "Wedding Bell Blues"
6. "California Soul"

Side Two

1. "Up – Up and Away"
2. "Blowin' Away"
3. "Carpet Man"
4. "Workin' On a Groovy Thing"
5. "Paper Cup"
6. "Sweet Blindness"

== Personnel ==
- Marilyn McCoo – vocals
- Florence LaRue – vocals
- Billy Davis, Jr. – vocals
- Lamonte McLemore – vocals
- Ron Townson – vocals

== Musicians ==
- Hal Blaine – drums, percussion
- Joe Osborn, Larry Knechtel – bass
- Jimmy Webb, Larry Knechtel, Jimmy Rowles, Pete Jolly – keyboards
- Ray Pohlman, Johnny Rivers, Al Casey, Dennis Budimir, Mike Deasy, Bill Fulton – guitars
- Larry Bunker – congas, mallets, percussion

== Charts ==
Weekly chart peaks for Greatest Hits
Chart (1970)	Peak position
CAN RPM Top 100 Albums	3
US Billboard Top LP's	5
US Billboard Best-Selling Soul LP's	8
US Cashbox Top 100 Albums	7

Year-end positions for Greatest Hits
Chart (1970)	Peak position
Billboard 200	35
Cashbox 100	28

== Certifications ==
Region	Certification	Certified units/sales
United States (RIAA)	Gold	500,000^{^}
^{^} Shipments figures based on certification alone.
