= Greatest Hits on Earth =

Greatest hits album by The 5th Dimension
- Released: 1972
- Genre: Rock/Pop
- Length: 37:14
- Label: Bell Records
- Producer: Bones Howe

The 5th Dimension chronology
Individually & Collectively (1972)	Greatest Hits on Earth (1972)	Living Together, Growing Together (1973)

Professional ratings
Review scores
Source	Rating
AllMusic	4.5/5 stars
The Encyclopedia of Popular Music	3/5 stars
The New Rolling Stone Record Guide	3/5 stars

Greatest Hits on Earth is a greatest hits compilation by The 5th Dimension, released in 1972.

== Chart performance ==
Consisting of charted singles from both Soul City and Bell labels, it spent 24 weeks on the Billboard Top LP's & Tape chart and peaked at No. 14. The album reached the top-10 on the Billboard Best-Selling Soul LP's and nearly missed the pop top-15 in Canada.

In December 1972 the album was certified Gold by the RIAA.

== Track listing ==
=== Side 1 ===
1. "(Last Night) I Didn't Get to Sleep at All" – 3:12
2. "Stoned Soul Picnic" – 3:23
3. "One Less Bell to Answer" – 3:29
4. "Medley: Aquarius/Let the Sunshine In (The Flesh Failures)" – 4:49
5. "Wedding Bell Blues" – 2:42

=== Side 2 ===
1. "Save the Country" – 2:39
2. "Love's Lines, Angles and Rhymes (song)" – 3:57
3. "Puppet Man" – 2:58
4. "Up, Up and Away" – 2:40
5. "Never My Love" – 3:55
6. "Together Let's Find Love" – 3:30

== Charts ==
Chart peaks for Greatest Hits on Earth
Chart (1972)	Peak position
CAN RPM Top 100 Albums	17
US Billboard Top LP's & Tape	14
US Billboard Best-Selling Soul LP's	10
US Cashbox Top 100 Albums	22

== Certifications ==
Region	Certification	Certified units/sales
United States (RIAA)	Gold	500,000^{^}
^{^} Shipments figures based on certification alone.
