= The July 5th Album =

The July 5 Album

Compilation album by the 5th Dimension
- Released: August 15, 1970
- Label: Soul City

The 5th Dimension chronology
Portrait (1970)	The July 5 Album (1970)	Love's Lines, Angles and Rhymes (1971)

The July 5 Album is the second compilation album by American pop group the 5th Dimension, released in 1970 by Soul City. It is composed primarily of album tracks from amongst the group's four albums of original material for Soul City Records, many of which were B-sides to charting singles. It also includes the group's first top 20 single, a cover of the Mamas & the Papas hit "Go Where You Wanna Go". Choosing that single, and seeing it become successful, became something of a mixed blessing for The 5th Dimension, as they were frequently referred to in the media as "The Black Mamas & the Papas", a label the group sought to escape while creating their own unique identity.

The July 5 Album was the final album release for Soul City Records' distribution deal with Liberty Records. The 5th Dimension subsequently signed with Bell Records.

== Chart performance ==
Released on August 15, 1970, just three months after their prior Greatest Hits (Soul City) album, The July 5 Album peaked at No. 63 on Billboard magazine's Top 200 LP's chart. It also reached the top-20 in Australia and the top-50 in Canada.

In the second week of its release, The July 5 Album was one of four albums by the 5th Dimension in the top 100 of Billboard's albums chart: Greatest Hits (Soul City) was at No. 23, The Age of Aquarius – from which four of The July 5 Album's tracks were pulled – sat at No. 98, and Portrait appeared at No. 64.

== Track listing ==
Track	Song	Album
1	Sunshine of Your Love	The Age of Aquarius
2	It'll Never Be The Same Again	Stoned Soul Picnic
3	Don'tcha Hear Me Callin' To Ya	The Age of Aquarius
4	Those Were the Days	The Age of Aquarius
5	The Sailboat Song	Stoned Soul Picnic
6	Ticket to Ride	The Magic Garden
7	California My Way	Up, Up and Away
8	Let It Be Me	The Age of Aquarius
9	Go Where You Wanna Go	Up, Up and Away
10	Poor Side of Town	Up, Up and Away
11	Bobbie's Blues (Who Do You Think Of)	Stoned Soul Picnic
12	Lovin' Stew	Stoned Soul Picnic

== Charts ==
Chart peaks for The July 5th Album
Chart (1970)	Peak position
Australia (Kent Music Report)	14
CAN RPM Top 100 Albums	43
US Billboard Top LP's	63
US Cashbox Top 100 Albums	54

== Personnel ==
- Marilyn McCoo – vocals
- Florence LaRue – vocals
- Billy Davis, Jr. – vocals
- Lamonte McLemore – vocals
- Ron Townson – vocals
