= Reflections (The 5th Dimension album) =

Compilation album by the 5th Dimension
- Released: October 1, 1971
- Label: Bell

The 5th Dimension chronology
Love's Lines, Angles and Rhymes (1971)	Reflections (1971)	The 5th Dimension / Live!! (1971)

Reflections is a compilation album by the American pop group the 5th Dimension, released in 1971.

== Overview ==
It contains songs from while the band was recording for Soul City Records. It includes four songs that were originally released as A-side singles, although only one was a Top 20 hit ("California Soul", #25; "Blowin' Away", #21; "Carpet Man", #29; "Workin' On a Groovy Thing", #20). Bell Records released Greatest Hits on Earth the following year, which would include The 5th Dimension's biggest hits from both current label Bell Records and prior label Soul City Records.

The #16 hit "Go Where You Wanna Go" – The 5th Dimension's first Top 20 single – does not appear on either album nor did it appear on their original Greatest Hits compilation for Soul City, a Top 5 smash in 1970. The song only appears on The July 5th Album, released in 1970 and a compilation akin to a Greatest Hits, Volume 2. It was rated three stars by AllMusic.

== Chart performance ==
The album debuted on Billboard magazine's Top LP's chart in the issue dated November 6, 1971, peaking at No. 112 during a seven-week run on the chart.

== Track listing ==
1. "California Soul"
2. "Let It Be Me"
3. "Sunshine of Your Love"
4. "Poor Side of Town"
5. "Ticket to Ride"
6. "Blowin' Away"
7. "Workin' On a Groovy Thing"
8. "Carpet Man"
9. "Those Were the Days"
10. "It'll Never Be The Same Again"
11. "California My Way"

== Personnel ==
- Marilyn McCoo - vocals
- Florence LaRue - vocals
- Billy Davis Jr. - vocals
- Lamonte McLemore - vocals
- Ron Townson - vocals

== Charts ==
Chart peaks for Reflections
Chart (1970)	Peak position
US Billboard Top LP's	112
US Cashbox Top 100 Albums	94
