= Portrait (The 5th Dimension album) =

Studio album by the 5th Dimension
- Released: April 1970
- Recorded: August 22, 1969 – March 20, 1970
- Studios: Wally Heider, Hollywood
- Genre: Pop
- Length: 38:25
- Label: Bell
- Producer: Bones Howe

The 5th Dimension chronology
Greatest Hits (1970)	Portrait (1970)	The July 5th Album (1970)

Professional ratings
Review scores
Source	Rating
AllMusic	4/5 stars

Portrait is the fifth album by the American pop group the 5th Dimension, released in 1970. This is the group's first album for Bell Records, having switched from the Soul City Records label. The cover features an impressionistic portrait by famous artist LeRoy Neiman.

The album languished in the mid-60s on the Billboard Top LPs chart after the release of its first three singles, none of which entered the top 20 of the American pop music charts. Bell Records, hoping to see a return on the investment they made by signing the 5th Dimension after the group's contract at Soul City Records ended, made a fourth and final attempt at a hit – a relatively uncommon practice at the time – with the release of Burt Bacharach and Hal David's "One Less Bell to Answer". The single rose all the way to No. 2 by Christmas 1970, becoming one of the group's greatest hits of all time. As a result, Portrait began climbing the charts once again, eventually peaking at No. 20. The single features Marilyn McCoo on lead vocal, and ushers in the 5th Dimension's transition from pop to adult contemporary artists. McCoo from this point became the primary vocalist for the group's subsequent chart hits, including "Last Night (I Didn't Get to Sleep at All)", "Love's Lines, Angles and Rhymes", "Never My Love", "If I Could Reach You", "House for Sale", "Everything's Been Changed" and "Flashback". This became a source of friction for the group as time went on, and was in part responsible for McCoo and husband Billy Davis Jr. leaving the group after the release of Earthbound in 1975.

== Track listing ==
Side one

1. "Puppet Man" (Howard Greenfield, Neil Sedaka) – 3:00
2. "One Less Bell to Answer" (Burt Bacharach, Hal David) – 3:31
3. "Feelin' Alright?" (Dave Mason) – 4:28
4. "This Is Your Life" (Jimmy Webb) – 4:13
5. "A Love Like Ours" (Bob Alcivar, Lamonte McLemore) – 2:39

Side two

6. "Save the Country" (Laura Nyro) – 2:39
7. "Medley" – 10:12
  - "The Declaration" (words are from the U.S. Declaration of Independence, the only known setting of it to music) (Julius Johnsen, René DeKnight) from the play "Bread, Beans & Things"
  - "A Change Is Gonna Come" (Sam Cooke)
  - "People Gotta Be Free" (Eddie Brigati, Felix Cavaliere)
8. "Dimension 5ive" (Bob Alcivar) – 4:15

Bonus track on CD

9. "On the Beach (In the Summertime)" (Landy McNeil) – 3:28

== Personnel ==
- Billy Davis Jr. - lead vocals (tracks 3, 7), background vocals
- Florence LaRue - lead vocals (tracks 1, 4), background vocals
- Marilyn McCoo - lead vocals (tracks 1–2), background vocals
- Lamonte McLemore - lead vocals (track 5), background vocals
- Ron Townson - lead vocals (track 9), background vocals

Additional personnel

- Michael Anthony, Mike Deasy - electric guitar
- Dennis Budimir, Tommy Tedesco - rhythm guitar
- Fred Tackett - finger pickin' guitar
- Joe Osborn - bass
- Hal Blaine - drums, percussion
- Larry Bunker - congas, mallets, percussion, drums
- Gary Coleman - mallets, percussion
- Larry Knechtel - piano, organ, tack piano
- Jimmy Rowles - piano
- Gary Illingworth - electric piano
- Bob Alcivar - arranger

== Production ==
As mentioned on the liner notes of the album, this was one of the first albums to be recorded on a 16-track recorder, and was recorded at the Wally Heider Studios in Hollywood. The sketches of the vocal recording sessions included in the album cover art are dated January 13 and January 14, 1970.

- Producer: Bones Howe
- Engineer: Bones Howe
- Mastering: Elliot Federman
- Digital transfers: Mike Hartry
- Reissue producer: Rob Santos
- Production coordination: Jeremy Holiday
- Production assistant: Bones Howe, Ann McClelland, Tom Tierney, Russ Wapensky
- Product manager: Mandana Eidgah
- Project coordinator: Arlessa Barnes, Glenn Delgado, Christina DeSimone, Karyn Friedland, Felicia Gearhart, Laura Gregory, Robin Manning, Brooke Nochomson, Ed Osborne, Larry Parra, Dana Renert, Bill Stafford, Steve Strauss
- Archivist: Joanne Feltman, Glenn Korman
- Research: Joel Whitburn
- Assistants: Larry Cox, Johnny Golden, Rik Pekkonen
- Arranger: Bob Alcivar, Bill Holman, Bones Howe
- Art direction: Beverly Weinstein
- Reissue art director: Mathieu Bitton
- Design: Mathieu Bitton
- Cover painting: LeRoy Neiman
- Liner notes: Mike Ragogna

== Charts ==
=== Albums ===
Year	Chart	Peak position
1971	CAN RPM Top 100 Albums	30
1971	US Billboard Top LPs	20
1971	US Billboard Best-Selling Soul LPs	6
1971	US Cashbox Top 100 Albums	7

=== Singles ===
Year	Title	Chart	Peak position
1970	"The Declaration"	US Hot 100	60
1970	"The Declaration"	US Easy Listening	35
1970	"On the Beach (In the Summertime)"	US Hot 100	54
1970	"On the Beach (In the Summertime)"	US Easy Listening	12
1970	"Puppet Man"	US Hot 100	24
1970	"Puppet Man"	US Easy Listening	31
1970	"Save the Country"	US R&B Singles	41
1970	"Save the Country"	US Hot 100	27
1970	"Save the Country"	US Easy Listening	10
1970	"One Less Bell to Answer"	US Hot 100	2
1970	"One Less Bell to Answer"	US R&B Singles	4
1970	"One Less Bell to Answer"	US Easy Listening	1

== Certifications ==
Region	Certification	Certified units/sales
United States (RIAA)	Gold	500,000^{^}
^{^} Shipments figures based on certification alone.
