= Soul & Inspiration (album) =

Studio album by The 5th Dimension
- Released: October, 1974
- Recorded: Artisan Sound Recorders
- Studio: Artisan Sound Recorders, Hollywood, Calif.
- Label: Bell
- Producer: Bones Howe, John Florez, H.B. Barnum, Richard Cason, The 5th Dimension

The 5th Dimension chronology
Living Together, Growing Together (1973)	Soul & Inspiration (1974)	Earthbound (1975)

Professional ratings
Review scores
Source	Rating
AllMusic	3.5/5 stars

Soul & Inspiration is the ninth studio album by the American pop group the 5th Dimension. It was released in October 1974. "Soul & Inspiration'" reached No. 55 on the Billboard U.S. Hot R&B chart, but did not place on Billboard's Top 200 Album Chart. The album was the last 5th Dimension recording released on Bell Records, and also marked the end of the group's association with their longtime producer Bones Howe. The album tracks were produced by various people, including The 5th Dimension members themselves. With the exception of a few songs such as "Harlem," "My Song," and arguably "No Love in the Room," much of the album's production leaned heavily towards the adult contemporary and easy listening music genres. The inclusion of six previously unreleased tracks on the compact disc edition greatly improved the offering.

Two singles were released from the "Soul & Inspiration" album in the USA:

- "Harlem" b/w "My Song" did not make the Billboard Hot 100 chart but reached No. 87 on the Billboard Hot R&B chart.
- "No Love in the Room" b/w "I Don't Know How to Look for Love" just missed making the Billboard Hot 100 chart, peaking at No. 105 in 1975. The track peaked at No. 11 on the Billboard Easy Listening chart.

== Track listing ==
Side A

1. "Soul & Inspiration" (Barry Mann, Cynthia Weil)
2. "Harlem" (Bill Withers)
3. "Best of My Love" (Don Henley, Glenn Frey, JD Souther)
4. "My Song" (Charles Richard Cason)
5. "Hard Core Poetry" (Brian Potter, Dennis Lambert)

Side B

1. "No Love in the Room" (L. Pedroski, P. McManus)
2. "House for Sale" (Larry Brown, Oleg Lopatin)
3. "Somebody Warm Like Me" (Bobby Arvon)
4. "Salty Tears" (T. Randazzo, V. Pike)
5. "I Don't Know How To Look For Love" (Ralph Graham)

CD Bonus Tracks

1. "As Long as There's an Apple Tree" (Burt Bacharach, Hal David)
2. "Out in the Country" (Paul Williams, Roger Nichols)
3. "Rusty Hands of Time" (Tony Macaulay)
4. "Somebody Warm Like Me" (Marilyn McCoo version)
5. "Love Story" (Francis Lai, Carl Sigman)
6. "Back Together" (Donald Addrisi, Richard Addrisi)

== Personnel ==
=== The 5th Dimension ===
- Marilyn McCoo - Soprano voice, lead vocals (track A3, B1, B2, CD track 14), background vocals
- Florence LaRue - Alto voice, lead vocals (track B4), background vocals
- Billy Davis Jr. - Baritone voice, lead vocals (tracks A4, B3, B5), background vocals
- Ron Townson - Tenor voice, lead vocals (CD track 15), background vocals
- Lamonte McLemore - Baritone and bass voice, background vocals

(Billy Davis Jr. and Marilyn McCoo sing duet on A1)

=== Instrumentalists ===
- Hal Blaine – drums, percussion
- John Myles – drums, tambourine, percussion (track A1)
- Joe Osborn – bass guitar
- Artie Butler – piano, electric piano
- Dennis Budimir – electric and acoustic guitar
- Louis Shelton – electric guitar
- Bud Shank – alto saxophone
- Bob Alcivar – conductor

=== Production ===
- Producer – Bones Howe (tracks A1, B2, B4, B5), Hidle Brown Barnum (track B3), John Florez (tracks A2, A3, A5, B1), Charles Richard Cason (track A4), The 5th Dimension (tracks A1, A4, B3, B4, B5)
- Engineer – Bones Howe, Armin Steiner, Grover Helsley, Michael Leitz
- Vocal Arranger – Bob Alcivar
- Arranger – D'Arneill Pershing
- Art Direction – Robert L. Heimall

== Singles ==
Year	Song	Chart	Position
1974	"Harlem"	Billboard Hot R&B Singles	87
1975	"No Love in the Room"	Bubbling Under the Billboard Hot 100	105
1975	"No Love in the Room"	Billboard Easy Listening	11
