= The Age of Aquarius (album) =

Studio album by the 5th Dimension
- Released: May 1969
- Recorded: 1968–1969
- Studios: Wally Heider (Hollywood, California); United (Las Vegas, Nevada)
- Length: 40:47
- Label: Soul City
- Producer: Bones Howe

The 5th Dimension chronology
Stoned Soul Picnic (1968)	The Age of Aquarius (1969)	Greatest Hits (1970)

Singles from The Age of Aquarius
- 1. "Medley: Aquarius/Let the Sunshine In (The Flesh Failures)" Released: March 1, 1969; 2. "Workin' On a Groovy Thing" Released: June 1969; 3. "Wedding Bell Blues" Released: September 1969; 4. "Blowing Away" Released: December 1969

Professional ratings
Review scores
Source	Rating
Allmusic	4/5 stars

The Age of Aquarius is the fourth album by the American pop group the 5th Dimension, released in 1969. It was the group's biggest commercial success in the United States, peaking at number two on the Billboard pop albums chart and the R&B albums chart.

== Track listing ==
Side One

1. "Medley: Aquarius/Let the Sunshine In (The Flesh Failures)" (Galt MacDermot, James Rado, Gerome Ragni) – 4:51
2. "Blowing Away" (Laura Nyro) – 2:32
3. "Skinny Man" (Michael Kollander, Ginger Kollander) – 2:51
4. "Wedding Bell Blues" (Laura Nyro) – 2:44
5. "Don'tcha Hear Me Callin' to Ya" (Rudy Stevenson) – 3:56
6. "The Hideaway" (Jimmy Webb) – 2:45

Side Two

1. "Workin' On a Groovy Thing" (Roger Atkins, Neil Sedaka) – 3:10
2. "Let It Be Me" (Gilbert Bécaud, Mann Curtis, Pierre Delanoë) – 3:54
3. "Sunshine of Your Love" (Pete Brown, Jack Bruce, Eric Clapton) – 3:18
4. "The Winds of Heaven" (Bob Dorough, Fran Landesman) – 3:14
5. "Those Were the Days" (Gene Raskin) – 3:03
6. "Let the Sunshine In (Reprise)" (MacDermot, Rado, Ragni) – 1:29

Bonus tracks

1. "Chissa Se Tornera (Who Knows If He Will Return)" (Mario De Sanctis, Antonio Salis, Lucio Salis) – 3:00 [Bonus track; 2000 CD reissue only]

== Personnel ==
- Billy Davis Jr. – lead vocals (tracks 1, 8), background vocals
- Florence LaRue – lead vocals (track 2), background vocals
- Marilyn McCoo – lead vocals (tracks 2, 4), background vocals
- Lamonte McLemore – background vocals
- Ron Townson – background vocals

Additional personnel

- Dennis Budimir, Mike Deasy, Bill Fulton, Tommy Tedesco – guitar
- Joe Osborn – bass
- Hal Blaine – drums, percussion
- Larry Bunker – mallets, congas, percussion
- Milt Holland – percussion
- Pete Jolly, Larry Knechtel, Jimmy Rowles – keyboards
- Bill Holman – strings & brass – string section, horn section
- Tony Terran – trumpet

== Production ==
- Producer: Bones Howe
- Engineer: Bones Howe
- Mastering: Elliot Federman
- Digital transfers: Mike Hartry
- Reissue producer: Rob Santos
- Production coordination: Jeremy Holiday
- Production assistant: Ann McClelland, Tom Tierney, Russ Wapensky
- Project coordinator: Arlessa Barnes, Glenn Delgado, Christina DeSimone, Robin Diamond, Karyn Friedland, Felicia Gearhart, Laura Gregory, Robin Manning, Brooke Nochomson, Ed Osborne, Larry Parra, Dana Renert, Bill Stafford, Steve Strauss
- Archives coordinator: Joanne Feltman, Glenn Korman
- Musical arrangements: Bob Alcivar, Bill Holman, Bones Howe
- Vocal arrangement: Bob Alcivar
- Art direction: Ron Wolin
- Reissue art director: Mathieu Bitton
- Design: Mathieu Bitton, Ron Wolin
- Photography: Ed Caraeff
- Liner notes: Mike Ragogna

== Charts and awards ==
=== Album ===
Weekly chart peaks for The Age of Aquarius
Chart (1969)	Peak position
Canadian RPM Top 100 Albums	2
German Media Control Charts	4
US Billboard Top LP's	2
US Billboard Hot R&B LP's	2
US Cashbox Top 100 Albums	2

Year-end positions for The Age of Aquarius
Chart (1969)	Position
US Billboard 200	21
US Cashbox 100	15

=== Singles ===
Billboard (United States)

Year	Single	Chart	Peak position
1969	"Medley: Aquarius/Let The Sunshine In (The Flesh Failures)"	Black Singles	6
1969	"Medley: Aquarius/Let The Sunshine In (The Flesh Failures)"	Pop Singles	1
1969	"Medley: Aquarius/Let The Sunshine In (The Flesh Failures)"	Adult Contemporary	1
1969	"Wedding Bell Blues"	Adult Contemporary	1
1969	"Wedding Bell Blues"	Black Singles	23
1969	"Wedding Bell Blues"	Pop Singles	1
1969	"Workin' On a Groovy Thing"	Black Singles	15
1969	"Workin' On a Groovy Thing"	Pop Singles	20
1970	"Blowing Away"	Adult Contemporary	7
1970	"Blowing Away"	Pop Singles	21

=== Grammys ===
Year	Nominee / work	Award	Result
1970	The Age of Aquarius	Album of the Year	Nominated
1970	The Age of Aquarius	Best Engineered Album, Non-Classical	Nominated
1970	"Aquarius/Let the Sunshine In"	Record of the Year	Won
1970	"Aquarius/Let the Sunshine In"	Best Pop Performance by a Duo or Group with Vocals	Won
1970	"Aquarius/Let the Sunshine In"	Best Arrangement, Instrumental and Vocals	Nominated

== Certifications ==
Region	Certification	Certified units/sales
United States (RIAA)	Gold	500,000^{^}
^{^} Shipments figures based on certification alone.
