= Stoned Soul Picnic (song) =

Single by The 5th Dimension

from the album Stoned Soul Picnic
- B-side: "The Sailboat Song"
- Released: May 1968
- Genre: Psychedelic soul; sunshine pop
- Length: 3:30
- Label: Soul City
- Songwriter: Laura Nyro
- Producer: Bones Howe

The 5th Dimension singles chronology
"Carpet Man" (1968)	"Stoned Soul Picnic" (1968)	"Sweet Blindness" (1968)

"Stoned Soul Picnic" is a 1968 song by Laura Nyro. The best-known version of the song was recorded by the 5th Dimension, and was the first single released from their album of the same title. It was the most successful single from that album, reaching No. 3 on the U.S. Pop chart and No. 2 on the Billboard R&B chart. It became a platinum record.

The song was composed and recorded by Nyro for her album Eli and the Thirteenth Confession, released in March 1968. According to Marilyn McCoo, it was producer Bones Howe who suggested that it would be a good song for the 5th Dimension to cover. The group would go on to record several more hits with Nyro songs, including "Sweet Blindness", "Wedding Bell Blues", "Blowin' Away", and "Save the Country".

An instrumental version was recorded by jazz vibraphonist Roy Ayers and became the title track to his 1968 album.

The word surry, used frequently in the lyric (e.g. "Surry down to a stoned soul picnic"), is a neologism by Nyro; its meaning is unclear. When producer Charlie Calello asked what the word meant, Nyro told him, "Oh, it's just a nice word." Possible origins include:

- slurry as in mining, a wash of sediment that flows down from an excavation site.
- contraction of let's hurry.
- surrey. a type of horse-drawn carriage popular in the late 19th and early 20th centuries, as popularized in the musical Oklahoma! with the song "Surrey with the fringe on top"; a way of getting to the picnic.

== Personnel ==
- Billy Davis Jr.
- Florence LaRue
- Marilyn McCoo
- Lamonte McLemore
- Ron Townson

Additional personnel

- Mike Deasy – electric guitar
- Joe Osborn – bass
- Hal Blaine – drums, percussion
- Larry Bunker – percussion
- Larry Knechtel – piano
- Jimmy Rowles – organ
- The Sid Sharp Strings – string section
- The Bill Holman Brass – horn section

== Chart history ==
=== Weekly charts ===
Chart (1968)	Peak position
Canada RPM Top Singles	3
U.S. Billboard Hot 100	3
U.S. Billboard R&B Singles	2
U.S. Cash Box Top 100	6

=== Year-end charts ===
Chart (1968)	Rank
Canada	28
U.S. Billboard Hot 100	17
U.S. Billboard R&B	32
U.S. Cash Box	29

== Certifications ==
Region	Certification	Certified units/sales
United States (RIAA)	Platinum	1,000,000^{^}
^{^} Shipments figures based on certification alone.

== Sampling and covers ==
"Stoned Soul Picnic" has been covered by:

- Julie London on Yummy, Yummy, Yummy, 1969
- British pop group Swing Out Sister on Shapes and Patterns, 1997
- Afro-Celtic artist Laura Love on Fourteen Days, 2000
- Jill Sobule as a single, 2001
- British jazz singer Claire Teal on Don't Talk, 2004
- the New York Voices on A Day Like This, 2007
- Billy Childs on Map to the Treasure: Reimagining Laura Nyro, sung by Ledisi, 2014

It has also been sampled by:

- Crystal Waters in "Ghetto Day" on Storyteller, 1994
- Australian electronic duo Madison Avenue in "Edible French Chic" on The Polyester Embassy, 2000
- The Go! Team in "Everyone's a V.I.P. to Someone" on their debut album Thunder, Lightning, Strike, 2004

Chicano Batman has a song with the same title on their 2014 album Cycles Of Existential Rhyme.
