= Stoned Soul Picnic (The 5th Dimension album) =

Studio album by the 5th Dimension
- Released: August 1968
- Recorded: March 11 – June 19, 1968
- Studios: United Western, Los Angeles
- Length: 33:14
- Label: Soul City
- Producer: Bones Howe

The 5th Dimension chronology
| The Magic Garden (1967) | Stoned Soul Picnic (1968) | The Age of Aquarius (1969) |

Singles from Stoned Soul Picnic
- 1. "Stoned Soul Picnic" Released: June 1968; 2. "Sweet Blindness" Released: 1968; 3. "California Soul" Released: 1968

Professional ratings
Review scores
| Source | Rating |
|---|---|
| AllMusic | 3/5 stars |

Stoned Soul Picnic is the third album by the American pop group The 5th Dimension, released in 1968. Early versions of the album had a lyric sheet inserted in the sleeve.

Stoned Soul Picnic was the third and final album by the group to be issued in both mono (SCM 91002) and stereo (SCS 92002) as monaural albums were being phased out during its release in 1968. As a result, mono copies were pressed in a limited quantity and are considered rare in the collectors market.

== Track listing ==
=== Side 1 ===
1. "Sweet Blindness" (Laura Nyro) – 3:27
2. "It'll Never Be the Same Again" (Jeff Comanor) – 3:08
3. "The Sailboat Song" (Jeff Comanor) – 2:52
4. "It's a Great Life" (Denny McReynolds, Karen O'Hara) – 3:08
5. "Stoned Soul Picnic" (Laura Nyro) – 3:30

=== Side 2 ===
1. "California Soul" (Nickolas Ashford, Valerie Simpson) – 3:16
2. "Lovin' Stew" (Jules Alexander, Jeff Comanor) – 2:51
3. "Broken Wing Bird" (Bob Alcivar, Kellie McKinney) – 2:41
4. "Good News" (Dick Addrisi, Don Addrisi) – 2:37
5. "Bobbie's Blues (Who Do You Think of?)" (Jeff Comanor) – 3:18
6. "The Eleventh Song (What a Groovy Day!)" (Jimmy Webb) – 2:26

=== Previously unreleased bonus track on CD ===
1. "East of Java" (Frank Unzueta) – 3:06

== Personnel ==
- Billy Davis Jr. - vocals
- Florence LaRue - vocals
- Marilyn McCoo - vocals
- Lamonte McLemore - vocals
- Ron Townson - vocals

Additional personnel

- Mike Deasy, Tommy Tedesco - acoustic guitar, electric guitar
- Joe Osborn - bass
- Ray Pohlman - guitar, "super-twang" bass
- Hal Blaine - drums, percussion
- Larry Bunker - marimba, bells, vibraphone, temple blocks, percussion
- Larry Knechtel, Jimmy Rowles - piano, organ, keyboards
- The Sid Sharp Strings - String Section
- The Bill Holman Brass - Horn Section

== Production ==
- Producer: Bones Howe
- Engineers: Captain Nemo (Michael Shields), Bones Howe, Alex Kazanegras, Phil Ramone, Joe Sidore, Sol Weiss, Winston Wong, Mary Wood
- Mastering: Elliot Federman
- Reissue producer: Rob Santos
- Digital transfers: Mike Hartry
- Project coordination: Arlessa Barnes, Glenn Delgado, Christina DeSimone, Robin Diamond, Karyn Friedland, Felicia Gearhart, Marc Gordon, Laura Gregory, Jeremy Holiday, Robin Manning, Brooke Nochomson, Ed Osborne, Larry Parra, Dana Renert, Steve Strauss
- Product manager: Mandana Eidgah
- Production assistant: Bones Howe, Tom Tierney, Russ Wapensky
- Orchestra manager: Hal Blaine
- Musical director: René DeKnight
- Vocal coach: Ray Pohlman
- Realization: Johnny Rivers
- Horns & Strings arranged by: Bill Holman
- Vocal arrangements: Bob Alcivar
- Musical arrangements: Bones Howe
- Musical arrangements: Ray Pohlman
- Art direction: Woody Woodward
- Reissue art direction: Mathieu Britton
- Graphic design: Wayne Kimbell
- Reissue design: Mathieu Britton
- Photography: Rob Santos
- Liner notes: Mike Ragogna

== Charts ==
=== Album ===
Weekly chart peaks for Stoned Soul Picnic
| Chart (1968) | Peak position |
|---|---|
| CAN RPM Top 100 Albums | 28 |
| US Billboard Top LP's | 21 |
| US Billboard Hot R&B LP's | 10 |
| US Cashbox Top 100 Albums | 23 |

=== Singles ===
US Billboard charts

| Year | Single | Chart | Peak position |
|---|---|---|---|
| 1968 | "Stoned Soul Picnic" | Top R&B Singles | 2 |
| 1968 | "Stoned Soul Picnic" | Pop Singles | 3 |
| 1968 | "Sweet Blindness" | Top R&B Singles | 45 |
| 1968 | "Sweet Blindness" | Pop Singles | 13 |
| 1969 | "California Soul" | Top R&B Singles | 49 |
| 1969 | "California Soul" | Pop Singles | 25 |
