= Earthbound (The 5th Dimension album) =

Studio album by the 5th Dimension
- Released: August 1975
- Studio: Sunset Sound, Hollywood; Village Recorders, West Hollywood
- Length: 37:28
- Label: ABC
- Producer: Jimmy Webb

The 5th Dimension chronology
Soul & Inspiration (1974)	Earthbound (1975)	Star Dancing (1978)

Earthbound is the twelfth album by American pop group the 5th Dimension, released in 1975 by ABC Records. It is the last album for the group's original line-up of Billy Davis Jr., Marilyn McCoo, Florence LaRue, Lamonte McLemore and Ron Townson. After touring with the 5th Dimension in support of this album, Billy Davis Jr. and Marilyn McCoo (being married since 1969) left the group to work as a duo and as solo artists.

In contrast to most of their previous albums, Earthbound features synthesizers prominently in many of its tracks—particularly "Magic In My Life" and "Moonlight Mile". "Magic in My Life", the second and final single released from the album (after "Walk Your Feet in the Sunshine"), was also unusual in that it was the first 5th Dimension single to feature Florence LaRue on the lead. She would frequently be the lead on successive 5th Dimension singles with various line-ups.

Perhaps owing to its singular status as an ABC Records release, for decades the album remained the only one recorded by the original 5th Dimension line-up to not be issued on CD. It finally was released on CD in June 2014, through Real Gone Music.

== Track listing ==
All songs were written by Jimmy Webb, except where indicated.

1. "Prologue" (Jimmy Webb) / "Be Here Now" (George Harrison) – 4:05
2. "Don't Stop For Nothing" (James C. Johnson) – 2:43
3. "I've Got a Feeling" (John Lennon, Paul McCartney) – 4:23
4. "Magic in My Life" (James C. Johnson) – 3:17
5. "Walk Your Feet in the Sunshine" – 4:13
6. "When Did I Lose Your Love" – 2:47
7. "Lean On Me Always" – 4:28
8. "Speaking With My Heart" – 3:40
9. "Moonlight Mile" (Mick Jagger, Keith Richards) – 5:15
10. "Epilogue" – 2:37

== Personnel ==
Music

- Billy Davis Jr. – baritone vocals
- Florence LaRue – alto vocals
- Marilyn McCoo – soprano vocals
- Lamonte McLemore – bass vocals
- Ron Townson – tenor vocals
- Harvey Mason – drums, percussion
- Jeff Porcaro – drums ("Moonlight Mile")
- Fred Tackett – guitar
- Jesse Ed Davis – guitar
- Dennis Budimir – guitar
- Dan Ferguson – guitar
- Paul Stallworth – bass
- Bill Cuomo – ARP synthesizer
- John Myles – keyboards
- David Paich – keyboards ("Magic In My Life")
- Michael Lawrence – brass
- David Duke – French horn
- Vincent DeRosa – French horn
- Sid Sharp – strings
- John Myles – vocal arrangements and special vocal backgrounds
- Larry Coryell – acoustic guitar solos

Production

- Jimmy Webb – producer and arranger
- John Haeny – engineer (basic tracks)
- Alan O'Duffy – engineer (vocals, strings, and mixing)
- Carole Rubinstein – cover painting
- Sunset Sound and Village Recorders – recording
- Wally Heider – mixing
- ABC Recording Studios Inc. – mastering

== Charts ==
Chart (1975)	Peak position
US Billboard 200	136
US Top R&B/Hip-Hop Albums (Billboard)	30
