= Blackbird Lennon-McCartney Icons =

Studio album by Marilyn McCoo and Billy Davis Jr.
- Released: April 30, 2021
- Studio: EE1, California; Redstar, Silver Lake, California
- Genre: Pop; R&B
- Length: 64:37
- Label: BMG
- Producer: Nic Mendoza and Tim Sonnefeld

Singles from Blackbird
- 1. "Blackbird" Released: June 21, 2021

Blackbird Lennon-McCartney Icons is a studio album by American singers Marilyn McCoo and Billy Davis Jr., released on April 30, 2021. It was their first album under business mogul Kathy Ireland's new record label EE1 in partnership with international music company BMG. Davis credits Ireland and producer Nic Mendoza for bringing the project to life. The duo also felt encouraged to get in a studio due to concerns in the country and similar divisions experienced in the 1960s. The duo said it was a civil rights movement which became a human rights movement with a goal to encourage people to come together during trying times.

During an interview about the album on June 29, 2021, Questlove called Marilyn McCoo & Billy Davis Jr "the first couple of Pop and Soul." They would later appear in Quest's directorial debut, Summer of Soul. During Questlove's acceptance speech for his Oscar as best documentary feature, he called McCoo heart of the film.

== Singles ==
The album's lead single, "Blackbird", was released on April 19, 2021. Davis thanked Mendoza and Questlove for their involvement. "We thank Questlove, EE1, BMG and our Producer, Nic Mendoza, for giving us a platform at this age, to use our artistry as part of the activism we've always practiced." "Blackbird, fly ... even when the bodies of our babies are shot down or choked to death … their spirits continue to fight to equality. Those of us that are still here in the nest of life will continue this peaceful war for justice."

== Chart ==
Chart (2021)	Peak position
US Top Album Sales (Billboard)	78

== Release history ==
List of release dates, showing region, format(s), label, and references
Region	Date	Format(s)	Label	Ref.
Worldwide	April 30, 2021	CD; digital download; LP	BMG	
