= Together Let's Find Love =

- German release picture sleeve

Single by The 5th Dimension

from the album The 5th Dimension Live!!
- B-side: "I Just Wanta Be Your Friend"
- Released: December 1971
- Genre: Pop
- Length: 3:31
- Label: Bell
- Songwriter(s): J. W. Alexander, Willie Hutchingson
- Producer(s): Bones Howe

The 5th Dimension singles chronology
"Never My Love (Live)" (1971)	"Together Let's Find Love" (1971)	"(Last Night) I Didn't Get to Sleep at All" (1972)

"Together Let's Find Love" is a song written by J. W. Alexander and Willie Hutchingson and performed live by The 5th Dimension. It reached #8 on the U.S. adult contemporary chart, #12 on the Canadian adult contemporary chart, #19 on the Canadian pop chart, #22 on the U.S. R&B chart, and #37 on the Billboard Hot 100 in 1972. It was featured on their 1971 album, The 5th Dimension Live!!

The song was produced by Bones Howe and arranged by Bob Alcivar and Dave Blumberg.

== Sampling ==
- O.C. sampled the song in his song "Ga Head" from his 1994 album Word...Life.
- Lauryn Hill sampled the song in her song "Doo Wop (That Thing)" from her 1998 album The Miseducation of Lauryn Hill.
- Boot Camp Clik sampled the song in their song "I Need More" from their 2007 album Casualties of War.
