= On the Beach (In the Summertime) =

- Italian release picture sleeve

Single by The 5th Dimension
- B-side: "This Is Your Life"
- Released: August 1970
- Genre: Soul
- Length: 3:30
- Label: Bell
- Songwriter(s): Landy McNeil
- Producer(s): Bones Howe

The 5th Dimension singles chronology
"Save the Country" (1970)	"On the Beach (In the Summertime)" (1970)	"One Less Bell to Answer" (1970)

"On the Beach (In the Summertime)" is a song written by Landy McNeil and performed by The 5th Dimension. It reached No. 12 on the U.S. Adult Contemporary chart, No. 29 in Canada, and No. 54 on the Billboard Hot 100 in 1970.

The song was produced by Bones Howe and arranged by Bill Holman, Bob Alcivar, and Howe.
