= Love's Lines, Angles and Rhymes (song) =

Single by The 5th Dimension

from the album Love's Lines, Angles and Rhymes
- B-side: "The Singer"
- Released: February 1971
- Genre: Soul
- Length: 4:11
- Label: Bell 965
- Songwriter(s): Dorothea Joyce
- Producer(s): Bones Howe

The 5th Dimension singles chronology
"One Less Bell to Answer" (1970)	"Love's Lines, Angles and Rhymes" (1971)	"Light Sings" (1971)

"Love's Lines, Angles and Rhymes" is a song written by Dorothea Joyce and performed by The 5th Dimension. It reached #6 on the U.S. adult contemporary chart, #19 in Canada, #19 on the Billboard Hot 100, and #28 on the U.S. R&B chart in 1971. It was featured on their 1971 album, Love's Lines, Angles and Rhymes.

The song was produced by Bones Howe and arranged by Bob Alcivar.

== Other versions ==
- Diana Ross recorded a version of the song in 1970 that was eventually released as a bonus track on the 2002 Expanded Edition of Diana Ross
- Brotherhood of Man released a version of the song on their 1972 album, We're the Brotherhood of Man
