= Sweet Blindness =

Single by The 5th Dimension

from the album Stoned Soul Picnic
- B-side: "Bobbie's Blues (Who Do You Think Of?)"
- Released: September 1968
- Genre: Sunshine pop; soul; drinking song
- Length: 3:24
- Label: Soul City 768
- Songwriter: Laura Nyro
- Producer: Bones Howe

The 5th Dimension singles chronology
"Stoned Soul Picnic" (1968)	"Sweet Blindness" (1968)	"California Soul" (1968)

"Sweet Blindness" is a song written by Laura Nyro, released in 1968, and included on her Eli and the Thirteenth Confession.

== Background ==
The song is a drinking song with an old fashioned sound, with tempo changes and a brass section. Critics have said the "song captures a carefree spirit and the liberating feeling of letting go of inhibitions to find joy in the moment."

== The 5th Dimension recording ==
The best-known version, however, was recorded by The 5th Dimension later in 1968. It was featured on their 1968 album Stoned Soul Picnic. The song was produced by Bones Howe and arranged by Bill Holman, Bob Alcivar, Ray Pohlman, and Howe. It reached #13 on the Billboard Hot 100 and #45 on the U.S. R&B chart. Outside the US, "Sweet Blindness" went to #15 in Canada, #10 in New Zealand and #19 in Australia.

== Other versions ==
- Liza Minnelli performed the song, with two male dancers, on The Ed Sullivan Show.
- Holly Cole released a version of the song on the 1997 tribute album Time and Love: The Music of Laura Nyro.

== In media ==
- The 5th Dimension sang a version of the song with Frank Sinatra on his 1968 television special, Francis Albert Sinatra Does His Thing.
