= Blowing Away =

- French release picture sleeve

Single by The 5th Dimension

from the album The Age of Aquarius
- B-side: "Skinny Man"
- Released: December 1969
- Genre: Soul
- Length: 2:30
- Label: Soul City
- Songwriter(s): Laura Nyro
- Producer(s): Bones Howe

The 5th Dimension singles chronology
"Wedding Bell Blues" (1969)	"Blowing Away" (1969)	"A Change Is Gonna Come/People Got to Be Free" (1970)

"Blowing Away" (sometimes written as "Blowin' Away") is a song written by Laura Nyro and included on her 1967 album More Than a New Discovery. In 1969, the 5th Dimension recorded it for their album The Age of Aquarius. Also released as a single, the 5th Dimension's version reached number 21 on the Billboard Hot 100. The song was produced by Bones Howe and arranged by Bill Holman, Bob Alcivar, and Howe.
