= One Less Bell to Answer =

1970 single by the 5th Dimension

Single by The 5th Dimension

from the album Portrait
- B-side: "Feelin' Alright?"
- Released: April 1970
- Recorded: 1969–1970
- Genre: Easy listening; pop-soul
- Length: 3:31
- Label: Bell
- Composer: Burt Bacharach
- Lyricist: Hal David
- Producer: Bones Howe

The 5th Dimension singles chronology
"On the Beach (In the Summertime)" (1970)	"One Less Bell to Answer" (1970)	"Love's Lines, Angles and Rhymes" (1971)

"One Less Bell to Answer" is a song written by Burt Bacharach and Hal David. Originally written in 1967 for Keely Smith, the song was rediscovered in late 1969 by Bones Howe, the producer for the 5th Dimension, and the song was included on the group's 1970 debut album for Bell Records, Portrait. Lead vocals on the single were sung by Marilyn McCoo.

"One Less Bell to Answer" was a platinum record. The song peaked at No.2 on the Billboard Hot 100 behind "My Sweet Lord" by George Harrison for the weeks of December 26, 1970 and January 2, 1971. On other US charts, it went to No.1 on the Adult Contemporary chart, as well as No.4 on the Best Selling Soul Singles chart.

== Background ==
Burt Bacharach and Hal David disagree on the origin of "One Less Bell to Answer". Bacharach told Paul Zollo, the author of Songwriters on Songwriting, that the song was inspired by an incident that occurred with his then-girlfriend, actress Angie Dickinson. "That was kind of a freak that it happened. The title was born from working on 'What's New Pussycat', and Angie Dickinson was living with me in London. A doorbell rang, and I think she made the comment, 'One less bell to answer, when I get out of here.' It was pretty intense, and it bothered her. We weren't married yet but we were living together. I think Hal heard her say, 'One less bell to answer'. He thought, that's a good song title and we wrote it."

In the liner notes of Bacharach's "The Look of Love" box set, Hal David described a different inspiration for the song: "Burt and I were in London working on a project, and I was invited to a dinner party. The hostess said to me, 'When you arrive, don't ring the bell, just come in. It'll make one less bell for me to answer.' I was wise enough to know it was a good title!"

== Personnel ==
The powerful, emotionally charged vocals are by the 5th Dimension's lead vocalist, Marilyn McCoo.

According to the AFM contract sheets, the following musicians played on the track.

- Hal Blaine: Drums, percussion
- Bones Howe
- Larry Knechtel: Keyboards
- Joe Osborn: Bass
- Tommy Tedesco: Guitars
- Gary Illingworth
- Fred Tackett: Guitars
- Jimmy Rowles: Keyboards, Piano
- Robert Alcivar
- Bill Holman: Saxophone
- Sid Sharp
- William Kurasch
- Ralph Schaeffer
- Arnold Belnick
- Assa Drori
- Tibor Zelig
- Bernard Kundell
- Henry Ferber
- Robert Konrad
- Bud Shank: Flute, Alto Saxophone
- Jim Horn: Saxophone
- Emil Richards: Vibraphone, Percussion
- William Hinshaw
- Jim Decker
- Richard Perissi

== Chart history ==
=== Weekly charts ===
Chart (1970–1971)	Peak position
Canada RPM Adult Contemporary	7
Canada RPM Top Singles	11
U.S. Billboard Hot 100	2
U.S. Billboard Easy Listening	1
U.S. Billboard Soul Singles	4
U.S. Cash Box Top 100	2

=== Year-end charts ===
Chart (1971)	Rank
U.S. Billboard Hot 100	98
U.S. Cash Box	91

== Certifications ==
Region	Certification	Certified units/sales
United States (RIAA)	Platinum	1,000,000^{^}
^{^} Shipments figures based on certification alone.

== Use in media ==
The 5th Dimension version of the song was prominently featured at the same time in an episode of the Robert Wagner TV series It Takes a Thief.

== Other versions ==
Bacharach himself included a version of it as the closing number, with Cissy Houston singing, on his own 1971 eponymous A&M album.

Rosemary Clooney had a national easy listening chart record of this song in 1968 (US No.34). Barbra Streisand partially covered the song in the medley "One Less Bell to Answer/A House Is Not a Home" on her 1971 album Barbra Joan Streisand. Also in 1971, Rita Reys recorded the song for her album Rita Reys Sings Burt Bacharach, which won her an Edison Award. Dionne Warwick recorded a version of the song on her 1972 Warner Bros. album Dionne; Bacharach and David produced their track for Warwick. Another 1972 cover was by Shirley Bassey on her album I Capricorn. Vikki Carr, Michael Ball, Vanessa Williams from Everlasting Love (2005), Trijntje Oosterhuis, and Sheryl Crow also have performed covers, and the song (specifically the Streisand medley version) was performed by Matthew Morrison and Kristin Chenoweth in an episode of the American television series Glee. In 2012 Steps covered the song on their album Light Up the World.

== See also ==
- List of number-one adult contemporary singles of 1971 (U.S.)
