= (Last Night) I Didn't Get to Sleep at All =

Single by The 5th Dimension

from the album Individually & Collectively
- B-side: "The River Witch"
- Released: March 1972
- Genre: Pop
- Length: 3:10
- Label: Bell
- Songwriter: Tony Macaulay
- Producer: Bones Howe

The 5th Dimension singles chronology
"Together Let's Find Love" (1971)	"(Last Night) I Didn't Get to Sleep at All" (1972)	"If I Could Reach You" (1972)

"(Last Night) I Didn't Get to Sleep at All" is a song written by Tony Macaulay and performed by The 5th Dimension with instrumental backing from L.A. session musicians from the Wrecking Crew. The song appeared on the band's album Individually & Collectively, produced by Bones Howe and arranged by Bill Holman. The song was a top 10 hit for the group in the U.S., and their sixth and final platinum record.

== Composition and recording ==
Tony Macaulay began work on the song while in Tokyo for the World Popular Song Festival of 1972. He met fellow attendees the Carpenters and was inspired to write a song emulating their hit "We've Only Just Begun" (Macaulay: "I liked the feel of that, the shuffle feel of it"). Macaulay recalls that due to changing time zones "I was awake all night and sleeping all day [in Tokyo]. So I just got up in the night and I wrote it". Although he was having sleepless nights in Tokyo, it was the melody rather than the lyrics that he wrote there. The lyrics were completed after Macaulay's return to London "in a taxi stuck in a traffic jam ... in about an hour going from one side of London to another".

Macaulay sent a demo of the song to the Carpenters. "They said they loved it and they'd do it. [Later] I got a phone call about 2 o'clock in the morning that woke me up (they hadn't figured out the time change between here and America). They said 'Oh, we can't record it because it mentions sleeping pills and they are drugs and we don't mention drugs.' So I got up in the middle of the night and rewrote the last verse without the sleeping pills." However, Macaulay was not happy with the change to the lyric, so when Bones Howe contacted him the next week, Macaulay pitched "(Last Night)..." for the 5th Dimension, who recorded it with the sleeping pill reference intact.

The lead vocals on the 5th Dimension's recording are performed by Marilyn McCoo.

== Chart performance ==
In the United States, the song reached No. 2 on the adult contemporary chart, No. 8 on the Billboard Hot 100 chart, and No. 28 on the Billboard R&B chart in 1972. It became the group's sixth and final platinum record. In Canada, it spent a week at No. 6 on the RPM 100 in July 1972.

== Other media ==
The Canadian apocalyptic black comedy film Last Night takes its title from the song, which is also featured on the soundtrack. At one point during the film, the song is heard playing over the radio as part of a "Top 100 Songs" countdown prior to the destruction of the world.

=== Weekly charts ===
Chart (1972)	Peak position
Australia (Kent Music Report)	7
Canada RPM Top Singles	6
U.S. Billboard Hot 100	8
U.S. Billboard Easy Listening	2
U.S. Billboard R&B	28
U.S. Cash Box Top 100	6

=== Year-end charts ===
Chart (1972)	Rank
Canada	77
U.S. Billboard Hot 100	31
U.S. Cash Box	28

== Certifications ==
Region	Certification	Certified units/sales
United States (RIAA)	Platinum	1,000,000^{^}
^{^} Shipments figures based on certification alone.

== Other versions ==
- Vikki Carr on her 1972 album, The First Time Ever (I Saw Your Face).
- Johnny Mathis on his 1972 album, The First Time Ever (I Saw Your Face).
- The Reels on their 1982 album, Beautiful.
- Guys 'n' Dolls
