= Up, Up and Away (song) =

1967 album by the 5th Dimension

Single by the 5th Dimension

from the album Up, Up and Away
- B-side: "Which Way to Nowhere"
- Released: May 1967
- Recorded: February 22, 1967
- Studio: Sound Recorders, Hollywood, California
- Genre: Sunshine pop; soul
- Length: 2:40
- Label: Soul City
- Songwriter: Jimmy Webb
- Producers: Johnny Rivers and Marc Gordon

The 5th Dimension singles chronology
"Another Day, Another Heartache" (1967)	"Up, Up and Away" (1967)	"Paper Cup" (1967)

"Up, Up and Away"
The 5th Dimension's "Up, Up and Away" from Up, Up and Away

"Up, Up and Away" is a 1967 song written by Jimmy Webb and recorded (as "Up–Up and Away") by US soul-pop act the 5th Dimension with backing from members of The Wrecking Crew. Their original version reached no. 7 on Billboard's Hot 100 in July 1967 and no. 9 on its Easy Listening chart, and number one in both Canada and Australia. In 1999, Webb's song placed 43 on BMI's "Top 100 Songs of the Century".

A canonical example of sunshine pop, themed around images of hot air ballooning, it cleaned up at the 10th Annual Grammy Awards in 1968, winning for Record of the Year, Song of the Year, Best Pop Performance by a Duo or Group with Vocals, Best Performance by a Vocal Group, Best Performance by a Chorus and Best Contemporary Song. The five Grammy wins was a standalone record for most Grammys received by a single song until 2025 when Kendrick Lamar's "Not Like Us" tied it at the 67th Annual Grammy Awards. In 2003, the song was inducted into the Grammy Hall of Fame.

== Personnel ==
The musical backing was dominated by members of The Wrecking Crew, including trumpeter Tony Terran.

According to the AFM contract sheet, the following musicians laid down the initial instrumental track on February 22, 1967:

- Hal Blaine (drums)
- Larry Knechtel (keyboards)
- Gayle Levant (harp)
- Joe Osborn (bass)
- Johnny Rivers (guitar)
- Tommy Tedesco (guitar)
- Jimmy Webb (piano)

Two other session players featuring prominently in the final mix were Al Casey (acoustic guitar) and Bud Shank (piccolo).

== Chart history ==
=== Weekly charts ===
Chart (1967)	Peak position
Australia (Kent Music Report)	1
Canada RPM Top Singles	1
New Zealand (Listener)	9
U.S. Billboard Hot 100	7
U.S. Billboard Easy Listening	9
U.S. Cash Box Top 100	4

=== Year-end charts ===
Chart (1967)	Rank
Canada	66
US Billboard Hot 100	48
US Cash Box	57

== Notable cover versions ==
- Johnny Mathis released a cover version of the song on an album with the same name on October 23, 1997.
- In the United Kingdom the 5th Dimension single failed to chart. Released first, a version by US vocal act the Johnny Mann Singers reached no. 6 in August 1967. This rendition won a Grammy Award for Best Performance by a Chorus in 1968, while the version by 5th Dimension won the Record of the Year.
- Frank Ifield released a cover version on EMI (UK) Columbia label as a 1967 A-side single (released on July 7, 1967).

== Usage in media ==
- For a time, Dionne Warwick's song "I'll Never Love This Way Again" preceded reports about people with HIV/AIDS on Rush Limbaugh’s radio show. These later became "condom updates", preceded by "Up, Up and Away".
- The song was adapted, with new lyrics, as an advertising jingle for Trans World Airlines, which then used "Up, Up, and Away — TWA" as its slogan. It was also adapted into a jingle in Australia for the now defunct Trans Australia Airlines in the 1970s.
