= Save the Country =

- German release picture sleeve

Single by The 5th Dimension

from the album Portrait
- B-side: "Dimension 5ive"
- Released: June 1970
- Genre: Soul
- Length: 2:39
- Label: Bell Records 895
- Songwriter(s): Laura Nyro
- Producer(s): Bones Howe

The 5th Dimension singles chronology
"Puppet Man" (1970)	"Save the Country" (1970)	"On the Beach (In the Summertime)" (1970)

"Save the Country" is a song written by Laura Nyro, first released by her as a single in 1968. Nyro released another version of the song on her 1969 album New York Tendaberry.

== Background ==
Nyro was inspired to write the song after the June 5, 1968 assassination of Robert Kennedy.

== 5th Dimension recording ==
The most successful version was performed by The 5th Dimension. It reached #10 on the U.S. adult contemporary chart, #24 in Canada, #27 on the Billboard Hot 100, and #79 in Australia in 1970. It was featured on their 1970 album Portrait. The song was produced by Bones Howe and arranged by Bill Holman, Bob Alcivar, and Howe.

== Other versions ==
- Julie Driscoll with Brian Auger and the Trinity released a version of the song on their 1969 album Streetnoise.
- Canadian band The Sugar Shoppe, which included actor and singer Victor Garber, released a version of the song in 1969.
- Paul Revere & The Raiders (under the shortened name Raiders) made the song the opening track of their 1970 album Collage.
- Thelma Houston released a version of the song in 1970 that reached #73 in Canada and #74 on the Billboard Hot 100.
- Rosanne Cash released a version of the song on the 1997 Nyro tribute album Time and Love: The Music of Laura Nyro.
- Roberta Flack performed her version of the song in a live broadcast from KCET in the 1970s.
- Nyro's version was sampled by Kanye West on his song "The Glory" off his third studio album Graduation.
