= Florence LaRue =

American actress and singer (born 1942)

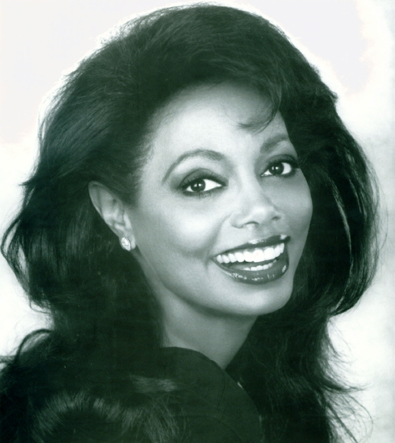
- Florence LaRue

Background information
- Born: February 4, 1942 (age 84)
- Education: California State University, Los Angeles
- Genres: Pop music
- Occupations: Singer, actress
- Years active: 1966–present
- Labels: Soul City, Imperial, Bell Records, Arista, ABC Records, Motown

Florence LaRue (born February 4, 1942) is an American singer and actress, best known as an original member of the 5th Dimension vocal group.

== Early life ==
She received a Bachelor of Arts degree in Elementary Education from California State University, Los Angeles.

== Work with the 5th Dimension ==
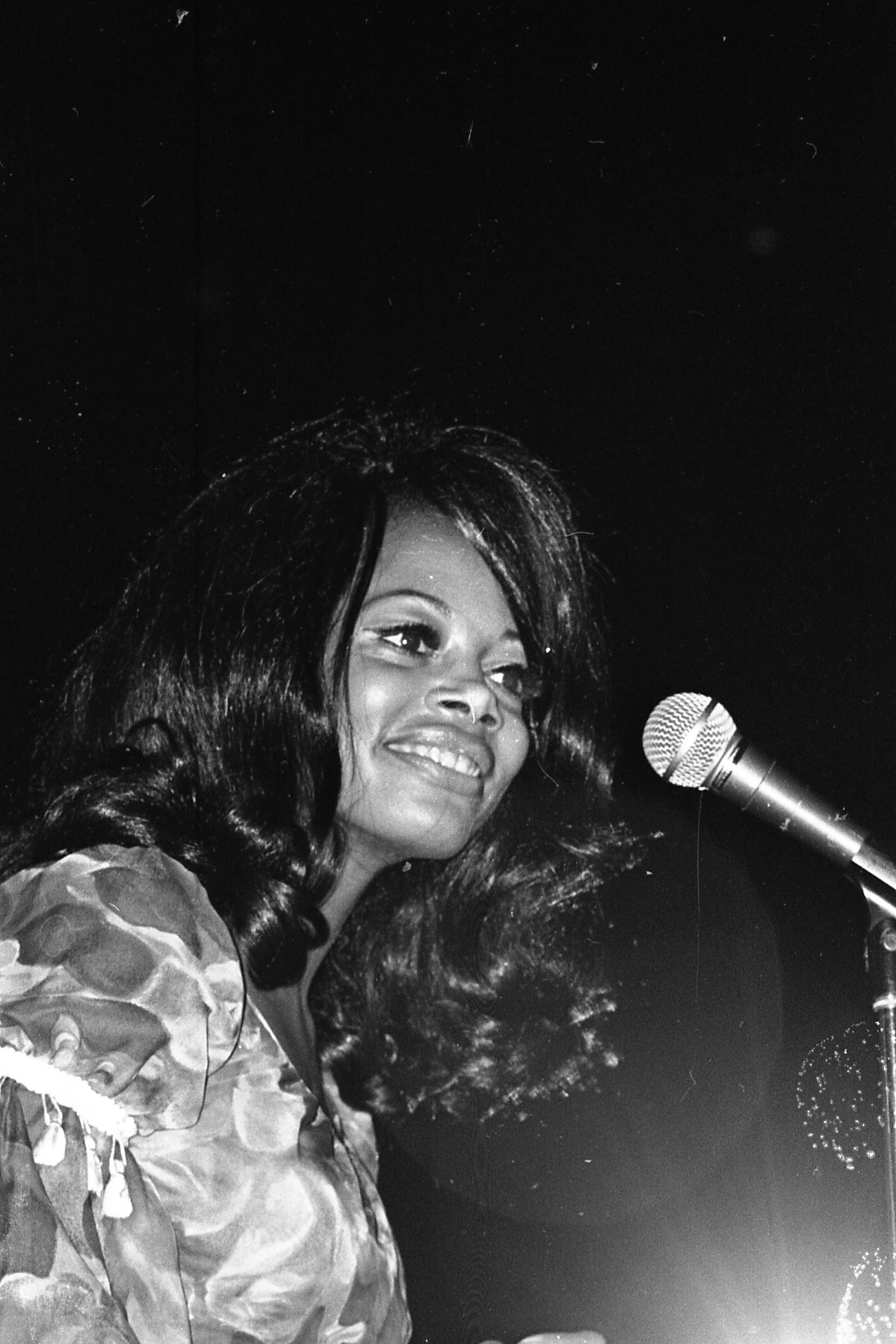
LaRue performing at Eastern Michigan University in 1970.

In 1966, LaRue was approached by Lamonte McLemore and Marilyn McCoo to join their recently formed group the 5th Dimension. LaRue nearly always sang female lead on one song per album, with McCoo taking the lead on one song as well; otherwise she sang the alto voice parts along with McCoo's soprano, being featured prominently on Stoned Soul Picnic, or shared the lead with McCoo on songs including "Blowing Away", "Puppet Man", "Save the Country", and "Sweet Blindness". After McCoo's departure, LaRue was lead singer on hit songs including "Love Hangover" (1976).

As a member of the 5th Dimension, LaRue received six Grammy Awards, including Grammy Award for Record of the Year for "Up, Up and Away" (1968) and "Aquarius/Let the Sunshine In" (1969).

== Acting and theater career ==
LaRue appeared in the CBS movie of the week Happy with Dom DeLuise. She also performed in the national tour of Broadway's Tony Award winning musical Ain't Misbehavin, and starred in the Toronto and Calgary productions of Mo' Magic.

LaRue co-hosted the Arthritis Telethon with Jane Wyman, judged two segments of Puttin' on the Hits, appeared as a celebrity guest on Star Search, and has been a special guest on numerous television shows, including several appearances on The Dale Evans Show, The Today Show, The Carol Lawrence Show, and numerous other Christian and secular programs.

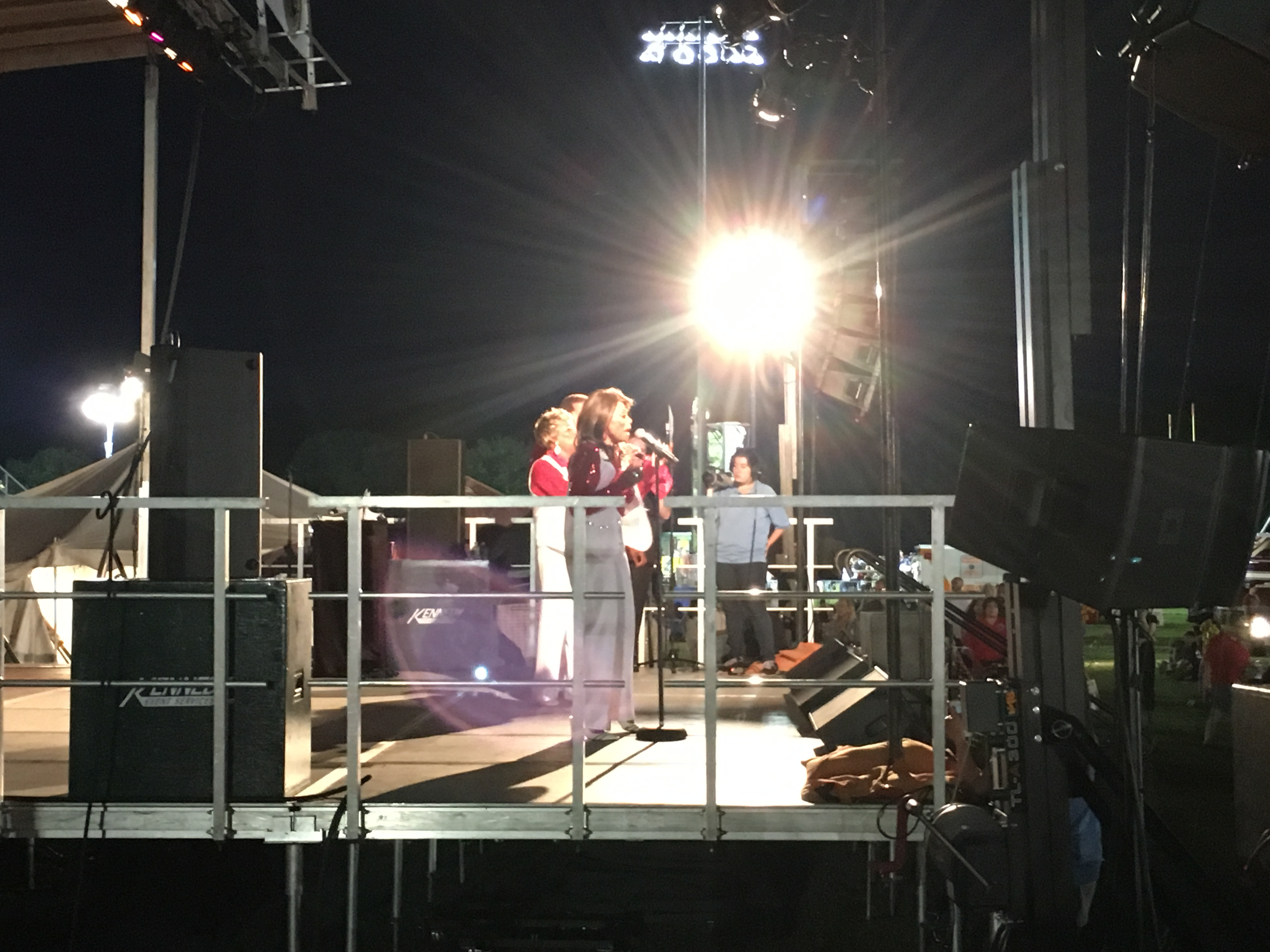
LaRue singing in a lead in a 2018 performance by Florence LaRue and the 5th Dimension in Manalapan, New Jersey

== Singing career ==
In April 2014, the group toured as "Florence LaRue & The 5th Dimension" led by LaRue with Willie Williams, Leonard Tucker, Patrice Morris, and Floyd Smith.

In June 2016, LaRue and the group performed in The Villages, Florida, just days after the Orlando nightclub shooting. LaRue shared her thoughts on the events saying, "We will not be terrorized. We know what’s happening in the world, but this is a song about good health, love, peace and happiness. We still believe in those things today," she stated before performing one of the band's hit singles, "Aquarius/Let the Sunshine In".
