= Aquarius/Let the Sunshine In =

"Medley: Aquarius/Let the Sunshine In"

Single by the 5th Dimension

from the album The Age of Aquarius
- B-side: "Don'tcha Hear Me Callin' to Ya"
- Released: March 1969
- Recorded: 1968
- Genre: Psychedelic soul; sunshine pop; bubblegum pop
- Length: 4:49 (album version); 3:50 (promo single edit)
- Label: Soul City
- Composer: Galt MacDermot
- Lyricists: James Rado; Gerome Ragni
- Producer: Bones Howe

The 5th Dimension singles chronology
"California Soul" (1969)	"Medley: Aquarius/Let the Sunshine In" (1969)	"Workin' On a Groovy Thing" (1969)

"Medley: Aquarius/Let the Sunshine In" (Note: Commonly called "Aquarius/Let the Sunshine In", "The Age of Aquarius" or "Let the Sunshine In") is a medley of two songs written for the 1967 musical Hair by James Rado and Gerome Ragni (lyrics), and Galt MacDermot (music), released as a single by American R&B group the 5th Dimension. The song spent six weeks at number one on the US Billboard Hot 100 pop singles chart in the spring of 1969 and was eventually certified platinum in the US by the RIAA. Instrumental backing was written by Bill Holman and provided by a group of session musicians commonly known as the Wrecking Crew.

The song is listed at number 66 on Billboard's "Greatest Songs of All Time".

== Background ==
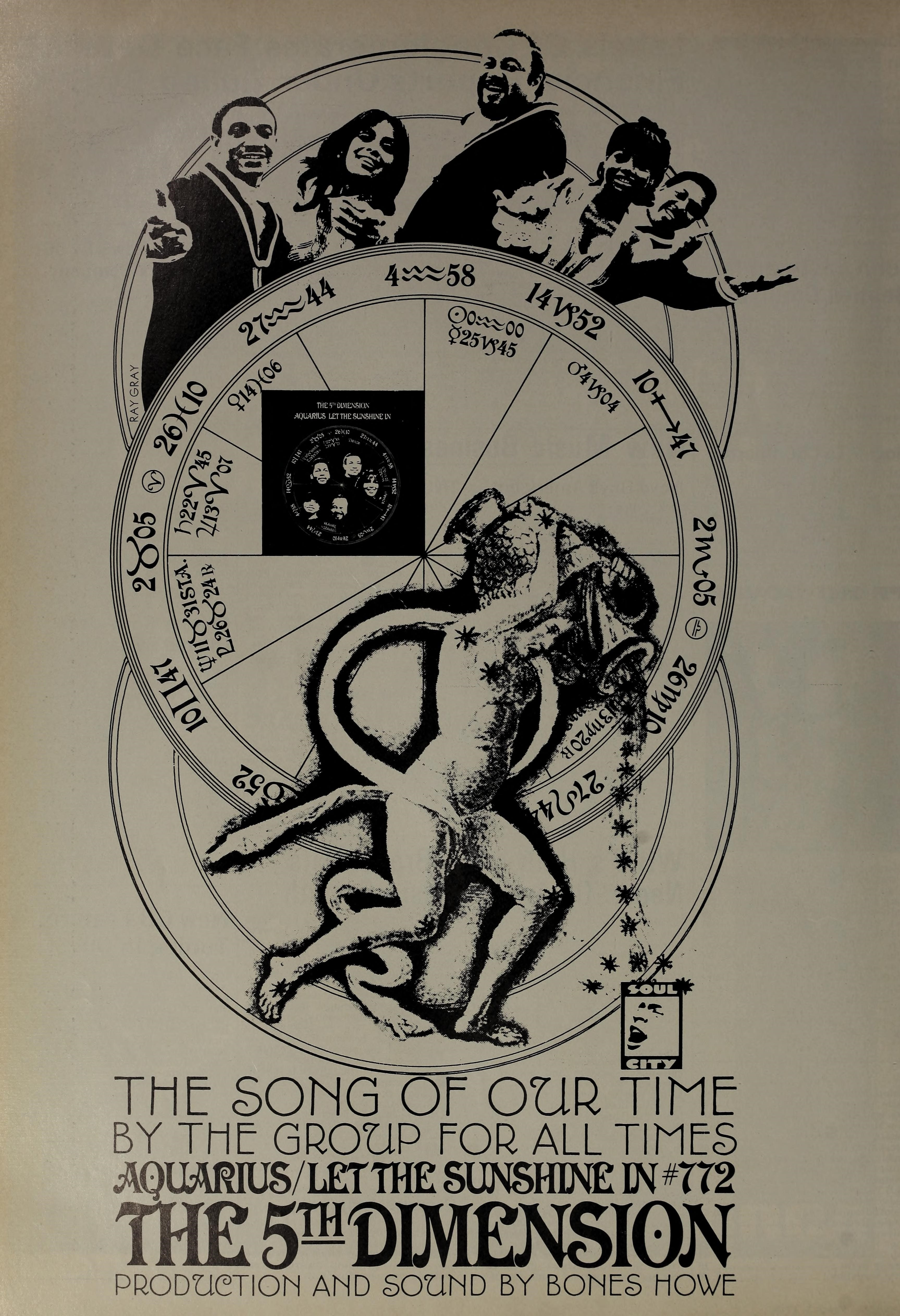
Cashbox advertisement (March 1, 1969).

The medley was constructed of two songs from the musical Hair: "Aquarius", and "The Flesh Failures: Let the Sunshine In". The lyrics of "Aquarius" were based on the astrological belief that the world would soon be entering the "Age of Aquarius", an age of love, light, and humanity, moving out of the "Age of Pisces". The circumstances for the change are given as: "When the moon is in the seventh house, and Jupiter aligns with Mars." (Astrologer Neil Spencer denounced this line as "astrological gibberish", noting that Jupiter forms an astrological aspect with Mars several times a year and the Moon is in the 7th House for two hours every day.)

The 5th Dimension's lead singer Billy Davis Jr. left his wallet in a New York City cab; the man who found the wallet was involved in the production of Hair and invited the group to see the show. The group called their producer Bones Howe in California: "After they'd seen it I received a phone call in which they were all talking over one another, saying 'We've got to cut this song "Aquarius". It's the best thing ever.'"

Howe was skeptical ("This isn't a complete song. It's an introduction."), but after seeing the show on stage he got the idea to combine "Aquarius" with another musical moment from the show, the last few bars from the song "The Flesh Failures: Let the Sunshine In" that consist of the repeated words "let the sunshine in". Although the two song fragments are in different keys and tempos, Howe resolved to "jam them together like two trains".

Returning to California, Howe supervised the first recording session. The instrumental track was set to tape at Wally Heider's Studio 3 in Hollywood by Wrecking Crew members Hal Blaine on drums, Joe Osborn on bass, Larry Knechtel on keyboards, Tommy Tedesco and Dennis Budimir on guitars and Tony Terran on trumpet. It also featured strings, winds, and brass instrumentations. The vocals were recorded later in Las Vegas, where the 5th Dimension was performing at the time, using only two microphones for the five singers. Davis's solo during "Let the Sunshine In" was improvised during the session; songwriter Jimmy Webb, who happened into the studio during the solo's recording, remarked to Howe: "My God, that's a number one record."

This song was one of the most popular songs of 1969 worldwide, and in the United States it reached the number one position on both the Billboard Hot 100 (for six weeks in April and May) and the Billboard Easy Listening chart. It also reached the top of the sales charts in Canada and elsewhere. Billboard ranked it as the No. 2 Hot 100 single for 1969, although "Aquarius (Let the Sunshine In)" would go on to outsell the Number 1 Hot 100 single for 1969, "Sugar, Sugar" by the Archies, and consistently ranks several positions above it in the all-time chart.

The recording won both the Grammy Award for Record of the Year and Best Pop Vocal Performance by a Group for the Grammy Awards of 1970, after its release as a track on the group's album The Age of Aquarius, and as a 7-inch single. The popularity of the song prompted the Apollo 13 crew to name their Apollo Lunar Module Aquarius, in part to send a message that astronauts were also "hip". In 2004, the song was inducted into the Grammy Hall of Fame.

The American Film Institute's 100 Years...100 Songs list, published in 2004, ranked "Medley: Aquarius/Let the Sunshine In" as number 33. In June 2026, CBS News included the song in its list of the 250 essential American songs of the past 250 years.

== Charts ==
=== Weekly charts ===
Chart (1969)	Peak position
Australia (Kent Music Report)	4
Austria (Musikmarkt)	11
Belgium (Ultratop 50 Wallonia)	23
Canada RPM Top Singles	1
Canada RPM Adult Contemporary	1
Ireland (IRMA)	15
Netherlands (Dutch Top 40)	12
Netherlands (Single Top 100)	14
New Zealand (Listener)	6
South Africa (Springbok)	3
Sweden (Kvällstoppen)	3
Switzerland (Schweizer Hitparade)	4
UK Singles (Official Charts)	11
US Billboard Hot 100	1
US Billboard Easy Listening	1
US Billboard Rhythm & Blues Singles	6
US Cash Box Top 100	1
West Germany (Musikmarkt)	2

=== Year-end charts ===
Chart (1969)	Rank
Canada - RPM's 100 Hits of 1969	3
US Billboard Hot 100	2
US Top Easy Listening Singles (Billboard)	13
US Top Soul Singles (Billboard)	50
US Cash Box Top 100	3

=== All-time charts ===
Chart (1958-2018)	Rank
US Billboard Hot 100	73

== Certifications ==
Region	Certification	Certified units/sales
United States (RIAA)	Platinum	1,000,000^{^}
^{^} Shipments figures based on certification alone.

== See also ==
- List of Billboard Hot 100 number-one singles of 1969
- List of recordings of songs Hal Blaine has played on
