= Marilyn McCoo =

American singer, actress, television presenter (born 1943)

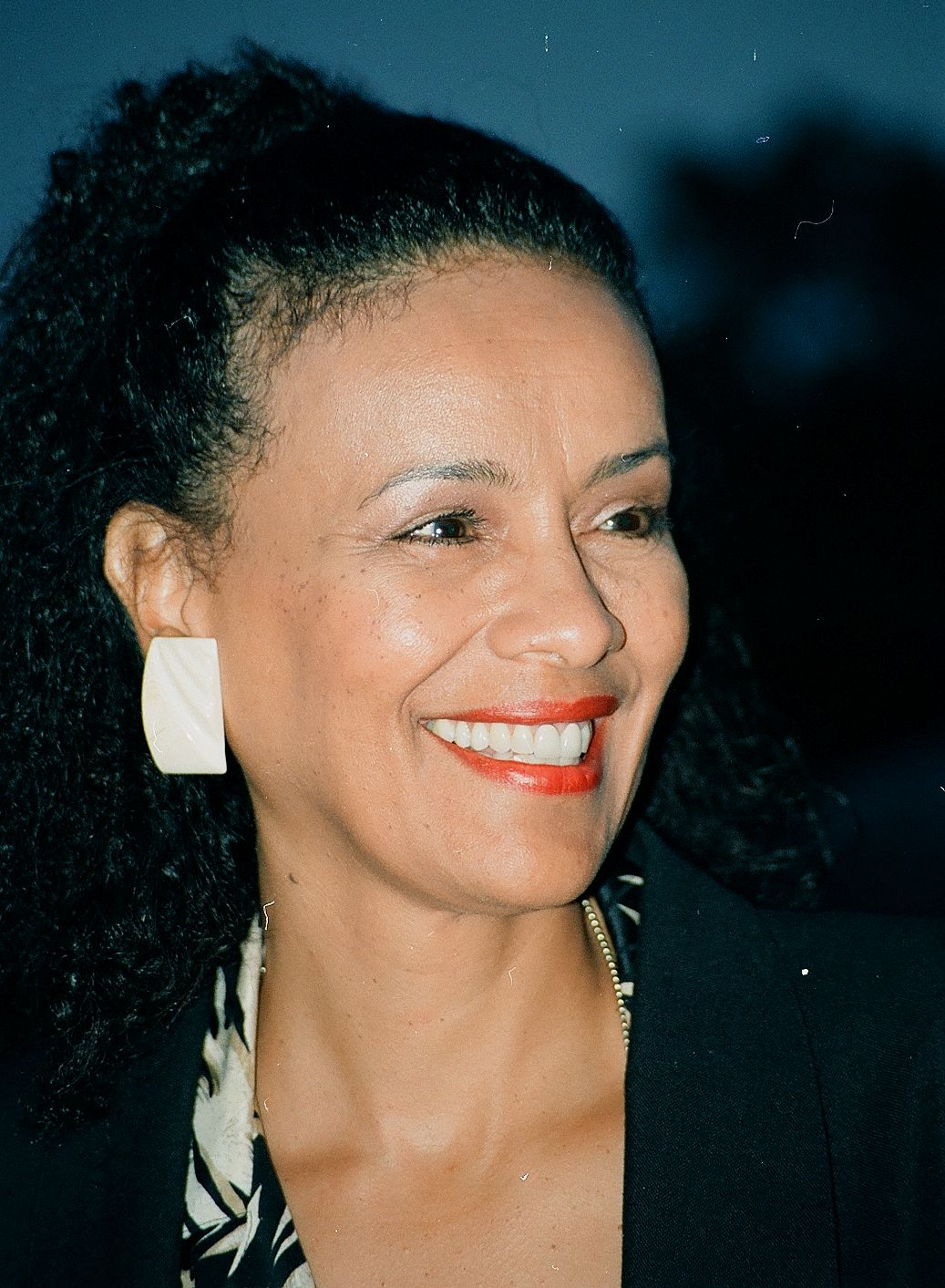
- McCoo in 1995

Background information
- Born: September 30, 1943 (age 82); Columbus, GA, U.S.
- Genres: R&B, pop
- Occupations: Singer, actress, presenter
- Instrument: Vocals
- Years active: 1966–present
- Labels: ABC Records; CBS Records
- Spouse: Billy Davis Jr. (m. 1969)
- Website: www.mccoodavis.com

Marilyn McCoo (born September 30, 1943) is an American singer, actress, and television presenter, who is best known for being the lead female vocalist in the group the 5th Dimension as well as hosting the 1980s music television show Solid Gold.

She has a three-octave vocal range.

== Early life and education ==
Marilyn McCoo was born in Jersey City, New Jersey, to Mary (née Holloway) and Waymon McCoo, who were both physicians. Her grandfather was doctor Thomas Vivian McCoo of Eufaula, Alabama. She is African American. She spent her first seven years in Columbus, Georgia. At the age of seven, she moved with her parents, two sisters, and brother to Los Angeles, where she began voice, piano, and dance lessons. At the age of 15, she made her television debut on Art Linkletter's Talent Show and began modelling. After graduating from Susan Miller Dorsey High School, she enrolled in UCLA, where she earned a degree in business administration. In 1962, McCoo entered the Miss Bronze California beauty pageant where she won "Miss Grand Talent".

== Career ==
=== Music ===
In the early and mid-1960s, McCoo was a member of the Hi-Fi's, who often opened for Ray Charles. She had been invited to join the group by photographer Lamonte McLemore, who later joined McCoo in the 5th Dimension. Other Hi-Fi members included Harry Elston and Floyd Butler, who later formed the Friends of Distinction. She met Billy Davis Jr. in 1966 when he established the 5th Dimension, then called the Versatiles, which also included Ron Townson and Florence LaRue. The group's first big hit was with 1967's "Up, Up and Away", written by Jimmy Webb. The song won four 1968 Grammy Awards and was the title track to 5th Dimension's first hit LP. A year later, the group recorded Laura Nyro's "Stoned Soul Picnic". A medley of "Aquarius/Let the Sunshine In" (from the musical Hair) reached No. 1 on the Billboard Hot 100 chart in April to May 1969 and won the Grammy for 'Record of the Year'. The group's recording of another Nyro composition, "Wedding Bell Blues", topped the Hot 100 in November 1969.

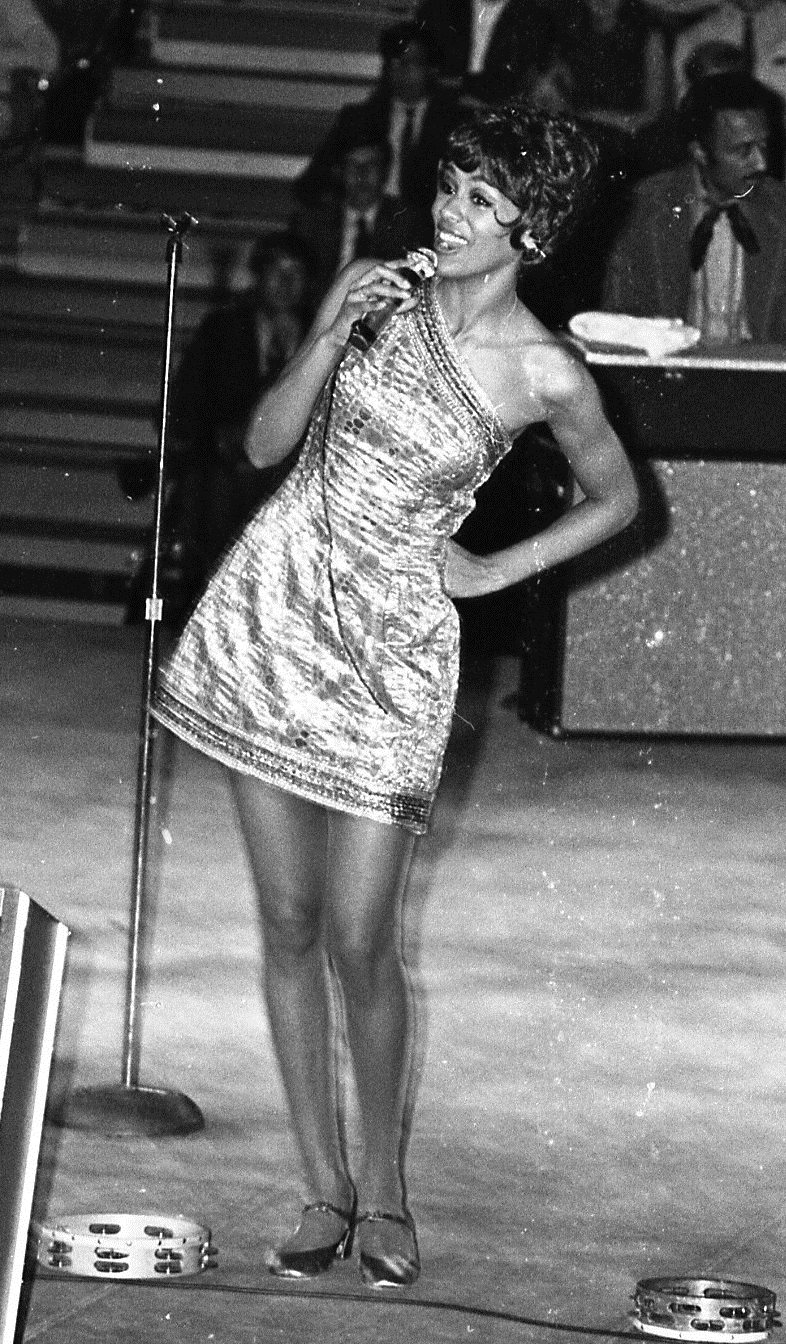
McCoo performing at Eastern Michigan University

By the early 1970s, McCoo began to sing lead on the group's remaining hits, "One Less Bell to Answer", "(Last Night) I Didn't Get to Sleep at All", and "If I Could Reach You".

In 1975, McCoo and Davis left the 5th Dimension and began performing as a duo. Landing a contract with ABC Records, they recorded their 1976 debut album, I Hope We Get to Love in Time. As a duo, McCoo and Davis were not as successful as the 5th Dimension; however, their first album did score two major hits and three overall singles: "I Hope We Get To Love In Time" (No. 91, March 1978), "You Don't Have to Be a Star (To Be in My Show)" (No. 1, September 1976), and "Your Love" (No. 15, March 1977). McCoo and Davis won the Grammy Award for Best R&B Performance by a Duo or Group with Vocals for "You Don't Have to Be a Star". The song peaked at No. 21 in Australia. They became the first African American married couple to host a network television series, The Marilyn McCoo & Billy Davis Jr. Show, on CBS in summer 1977. The duo released their next album on ABC in 1977, titled The Two Of Us. The album spawned the single "Look What You've Done To My Heart" (No. 51, August 1977). The pair signed with CBS Records and released their next album, 1978's Marilyn + Billy, although it did not include any Hot 100 hits. This would be the duo's last album until thirty years later; in October 2008 the pair released The Many Faces of Love, a collection of hit songs from the 1960s and 1970s.

After breaking from the 5th Dimension to perform as a duo and subsequently releasing three albums, McCoo and Davis Jr. next decided to go solo professionally in the early 1980s. McCoo began hosting the popular American music television show Solid Gold from 1981 to 1984 and returned from 1986 to 1988. She also embarked on a nightclub and concert act and went on to play the role of Tamara Price on the soap opera Days of Our Lives in 1986, as a friend of the character Marlena Evans. Price later became involved with James Reynolds' character Abe Carver. McCoo left the series in 1987.

McCoo's 1991 album, The Me Nobody Knows, was nominated for a Grammy. She also released a Christmas album in 1996. McCoo won her eighth Grammy (which also included work with the 5th Dimension) for her contributions to Quincy Jones' Handel's Messiah.

In 2021, McCoo and Davis released Blackbird Lennon-McCartney Icons, their first studio album in over 30 years. Entrepreneur Kathy Ireland released the album through her record label EE1. The duo said it was a civil rights movement which became a human rights movement with a goal to encourage people to come together during trying times. During an interview about the album on June 29, 2021, Questlove called McCoo and Davis "the first couple of Pop and Soul". They would later appear in Quest's directorial debut, Summer of Soul.

=== Acting ===
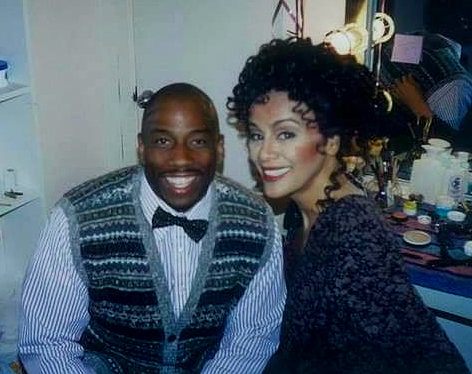
McCoo with singer Stacey Robinson

McCoo has acted in several movies, including Grizzly Adams and the Legend of Dark Mountain (1999), My Mom's a Werewolf (1989) and several television movies, often playing herself. She has appeared on stage in productions of Anything Goes, A...My Name is Alice, Man of La Mancha, and the Broadway production of Show Boat in 1995 through 1996. McCoo appeared together with Davis on The Jamie Foxx Show as Fancy's parents, the Monroes. McCoo also guest-starred on a Canadian game show in the 1990s, called Acting Crazy.

== Personal life ==
McCoo is married to fellow 5th Dimension bandmate Billy Davis Jr. On July 26, 2019, they celebrated their 50th wedding anniversary. The couple shared their story of love and faith in the 2004 book, Up, Up and Away. They continue to perform together in venues around the country. McCoo is a member of Sigma Gamma Rho sorority. She is an emerita member of the board of directors of the Los Angeles Mission. McCoo and Davis are born-again Christians. She has also recorded for the Warner Alliance Christian record label.

== Selected filmography ==
=== Features ===
- My Mom's a Werewolf (1989)
- Grizzly Adams and the Legend of Dark Mountain (1999)
- Summer of Soul (2021)

=== Television ===
- It Takes a Thief (1 episode, 1970)
- The Love Boat (1 episode, 1978)
- Solid Gold (host, 1981–1984, 1986–1988)
- The Fantastic World of D.C. Collins (1984)
- New Love, American Style (1 episode, 1986)
- The Fall Guy (1 episode, 1986)
- Days of Our Lives (1986–1987, 2019–2020)
- Punky Brewster (1 episode, 1988)
- Night Court (1 episode, 1990)
- The Kingdom Chums Original Top Ten (voice, 1990)
- The New Adventures of Captain Planet (voice, 2 episodes, 1993)
- Women of the House (1 episode, 1995)
- The Jamie Foxx Show (2 episodes, 1999–2001)
