= The 5th Dimension =

American popular music vocal group

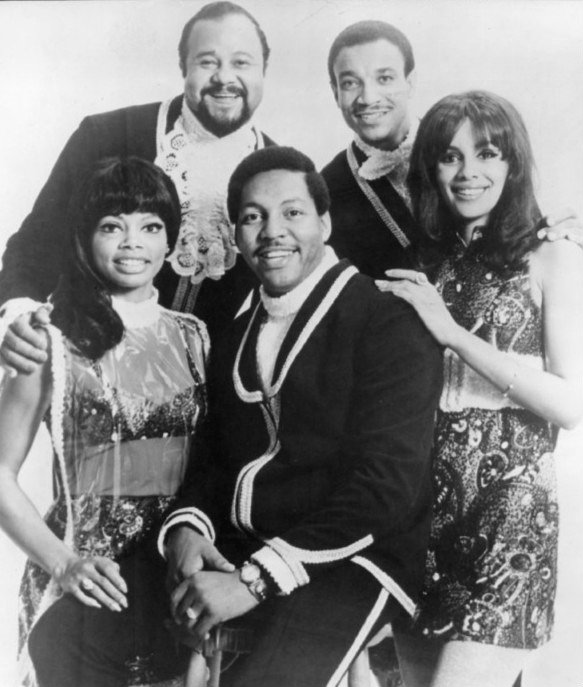
- The 5th Dimension in 1969; Back row: Townson and McLemore; Front row: LaRue, Davis and McCoo

Background information
- Also known as: The Versatiles (1965–1966)
- Origin: Los Angeles, California, US
- Genres: Sunshine pop; pop soul; psychedelic soul
- Years active: 1966–present (until 1975 in original incarnation)
- Labels: Soul City, Imperial, Bell/Arista, ABC, Motown, Columbia
- Members: Florence LaRue; Patrice Morris; Leonard Tucker; Floyd Smith; Sidney Jacobs
- Past members: Billy Davis Jr.; Phyllis Battle; Lamonte McLemore; Ronald Townson; Greg Walker; Marilyn McCoo; See: Membership section for detailed listing

The 5th Dimension is an American vocal group. Its music encompasses sunshine pop, pop soul, and psychedelic soul. The band was an important crossover music act of the 1960s and 1970s, although both praised and derided for their particular musical approach and mass appeal. During the original group's heyday, they were twice invited to perform at the White House, and accepting those invitations was controversial during that era of social upheaval.

Formed as The Versatiles in late 1965, the group changed its name to "The 5th Dimension" by 1966. Between 1967 and 1973, they charted with 20 Top 40 hits on the Billboard Hot 100, two of which – "Up, Up and Away" (No. 7, 1967) and the 1969 No. 1 "Medley: Aquarius/Let the Sunshine In (The Flesh Failures)"—won the Grammy Award for Record of the Year. Other big hits include "Stoned Soul Picnic" (No. 3), "Wedding Bell Blues" (No. 1), "One Less Bell to Answer" (No. 2), a cover of "Never My Love" (Pop chart, No. 12/Easy Listening No. 1), "(Last Night) I Didn't Get to Sleep at All" (No. 8), and "If I Could Reach You" (Pop chart No. 10/Easy Listening No. 1). Three of their records reached the Top Ten of Billboard's Rhythm & Blues/Soul chart. Five of their 19 "Top 20" hits on the Easy Listening chart reached the No. 1 position.

The five original members were Lamonte McLemore, Marilyn McCoo, Florence LaRue, Ronald Townson, and Billy Davis Jr. Their earliest recordings were on the Soul City record label, which was started by recording artist Johnny Rivers. The group later recorded for Bell/Arista Records, ABC Records, and Motown Records.

== Career ==
=== Formation ===
In 1963, Lamonte McLemore and Marilyn McCoo got together with three fellow vocalists from Los Angeles—Harry Elston, Lawrence Summers, and Fritz Baskett—to form a jazz-oriented vocal group called The Hi-Fi's. Ray Charles signed The Hi-Fi's as his touring opening act in 1963. The vocal group's name was changed to The Vocals, and they recorded a single, "Lonesome Mood" on Tangerine Records in 1963. When The Vocals broke up in 1964, McLemore and McCoo teamed up with two of McLemore's childhood acquaintances from St. Louis (now looking for music opportunities in Los Angeles): aspiring opera singer Ron Townson, and gospel and R&B singer Billy Davis Jr. And a second female singer was recruited: Florence LaRue, who—like McCoo—had won the Grand Talent award in the annual Miss Bronze beauty pageant, and had also been photographed by McLemore for the event.

The members began rehearsing as The Versatiles in late 1965. McLemore had been a staff photographer at Motown West in Los Angeles for a short period, so he connected with Marc Gordon, Motown's Senior Vice President in Los Angeles, to arrange for a meeting. Gordon gave The Versatiles permission to record some existing Motown songs as a demo tape, but it was left to McLemore to fly to Detroit and meet with Motown head, Berry Gordy and play the audition tape for him. According to McLemore, Gordy's response to the tape was non-committal:

Man, you all sound great, but I don't hear no hit. So just go back and cut some more.

Although Gordy had not immediately offered a recording contract to The Versatiles, Marc Gordon believed they had something special, and offered to manage the group. Gordon brought them to the attention of popular singer Johnny Rivers, who had just started his own label, Soul City Records. Soul City signed the group on the spot, but Rivers insisted on a new name. Townson and his wife came up with "The 5th Dimension," and as Davis recalled later, "We all heard it, we all agreed right away, 'That's got to be it!'" In November 1966, Soul City released their first single as The 5th Dimension, "I'll Be Lovin' You Forever", with a decidedly Motown-flavored arrangement. However, the song failed to chart.

=== Major hits ===
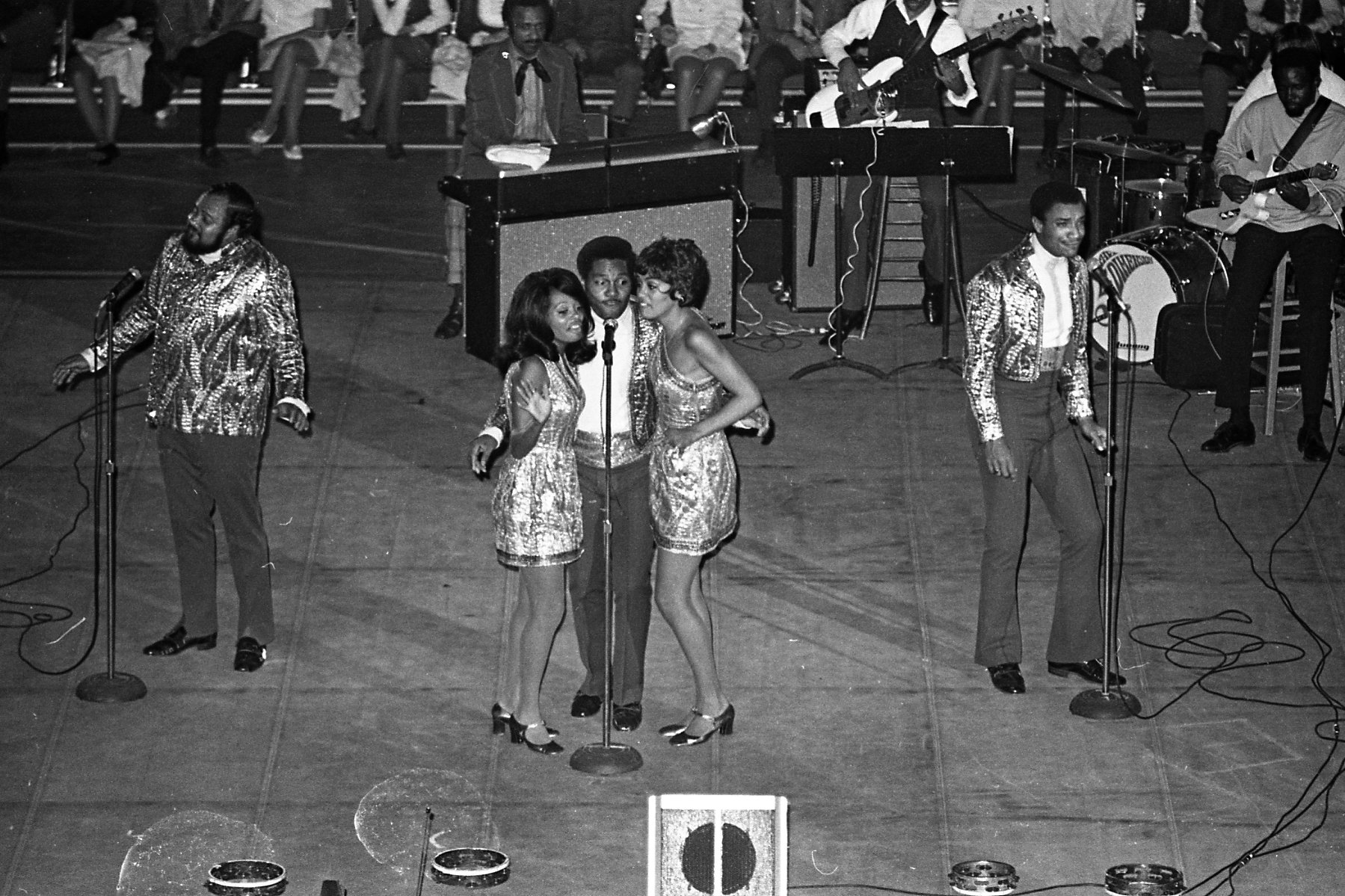
The group performing in 1970

In 1967 The 5th Dimension recorded "Go Where You Wanna Go," which became a breakthrough hit for them. The song was a John Phillips tune and reached No. 16 on the US Hot 100 chart. The group followed this with "Up, Up and Away", which reached No. 7 later that same year and went on to win five Grammy Awards. The following year, the group scored major hit singles with Laura Nyro's songs "Stoned Soul Picnic" (U.S. No. 3) and "Sweet Blindness" (U.S. No. 13). The group received a gold record for their album Stoned Soul Picnic, presented by Frank Sinatra at Caesars Palace, following a 1968 performance.

That album included "California Soul", which peaked at No. 25 in February 1969. Weeks later the group's success broke wide open, with "Aquarius/Let the Sunshine In" from the musical Hair topping the Hot 100 for six straight weeks in April and May and another Nyro song, "Wedding Bell Blues", doing the same for the first three full weeks in November. Their cover of Neil Sedaka's "Workin' On a Groovy Thing" went to No. 20 in between. Those four singles kept the group on the Hot 100 for all but four weeks in 1969. By some reckonings, "Aquarius/Let the Sunshine In" was the biggest hit single for 1969.

Later top 20 hits included 1970's "One Less Bell to Answer" (U.S. No. 2), 1971's "Love's Lines, Angles and Rhymes" (U.S. No. 19) and "Never My Love" (U.S. No. 12), and 1972's "(Last Night) I Didn't Get to Sleep at All" (U.S. No. 8) and "If I Could Reach You" (U.S. No. 10). The group had seven other top 40 hits, the last being 1973's "Living Together, Growing Together" (U.S. No. 32) from the film Lost Horizon.

=== TV and film appearances ===
- The 5th Dimension made numerous appearances on The Ed Sullivan Show, including shows on March 10, 1968; February 23, 1969; May 18, 1969; and in the last season of The Ed Sullivan Show, Sullivan dedicated the entire February 21, 1971, episode to the "5th Anniversary of The 5th Dimension."
- The group appeared on the Francis Albert Sinatra Does His Thing TV Special (1968), performing "It's a Great Life", "Stoned Soul Picnic", and "Sweet Blindness," sharing the stage with Sinatra for the final song.
- The 5th Dimension was the featured act of a July 28, 1969, CBS broadcast of highlights from the Harlem Cultural Festival, the "Black Woodstock" gathering in Mount Morris Park that drew 300,000 festival attendees over six shows. The New York Times reported The 5th Dimension show drew 60,000 alone.
- The group appeared on four separate episodes of the British Top of the Pops TV show from 1969 to 1972.
- The 5th Dimension appeared on Robert Wagner's popular adventure TV show, It Takes a Thief in 1970, performing "The Puppet Man" and "One Less Bell to Answer."
- The 5th Dimension Special: An Odyssey in the Cosmic Universe of Peter Max aired on May 21, 1970.
- On August 18, 1971, its television special The 5th Dimension Traveling Sunshine Show first aired.
- The group performed "Living Together, Growing Together," and "Nobody Knows the Trouble I've Seen" in Burt Bacharach in Shangri-La, a 1973 special promoting Lost Horizon.
- The 5th Dimension made appearances on Soul Train, American Bandstand, The Flip Wilson Show, The Mike Douglas Show, The Tonight Show Starring Johnny Carson, The Bobby Goldsboro Show, and The Glen Campbell Goodtime Hour.

=== Regrouping ===
In 1975, McCoo and Davis, who had married on July 26, 1969, left the group to do collective and individual projects. The duo had success with "Your Love" and the chart topper "You Don't Have to Be a Star (To Be in My Show)", which won them their seventh Grammy award as well as its own television variety program, The Marilyn McCoo & Billy Davis Jr. Show. Marilyn McCoo served a lengthy 1980s stint as the host of the TV show Solid Gold.

=== 21st century ===
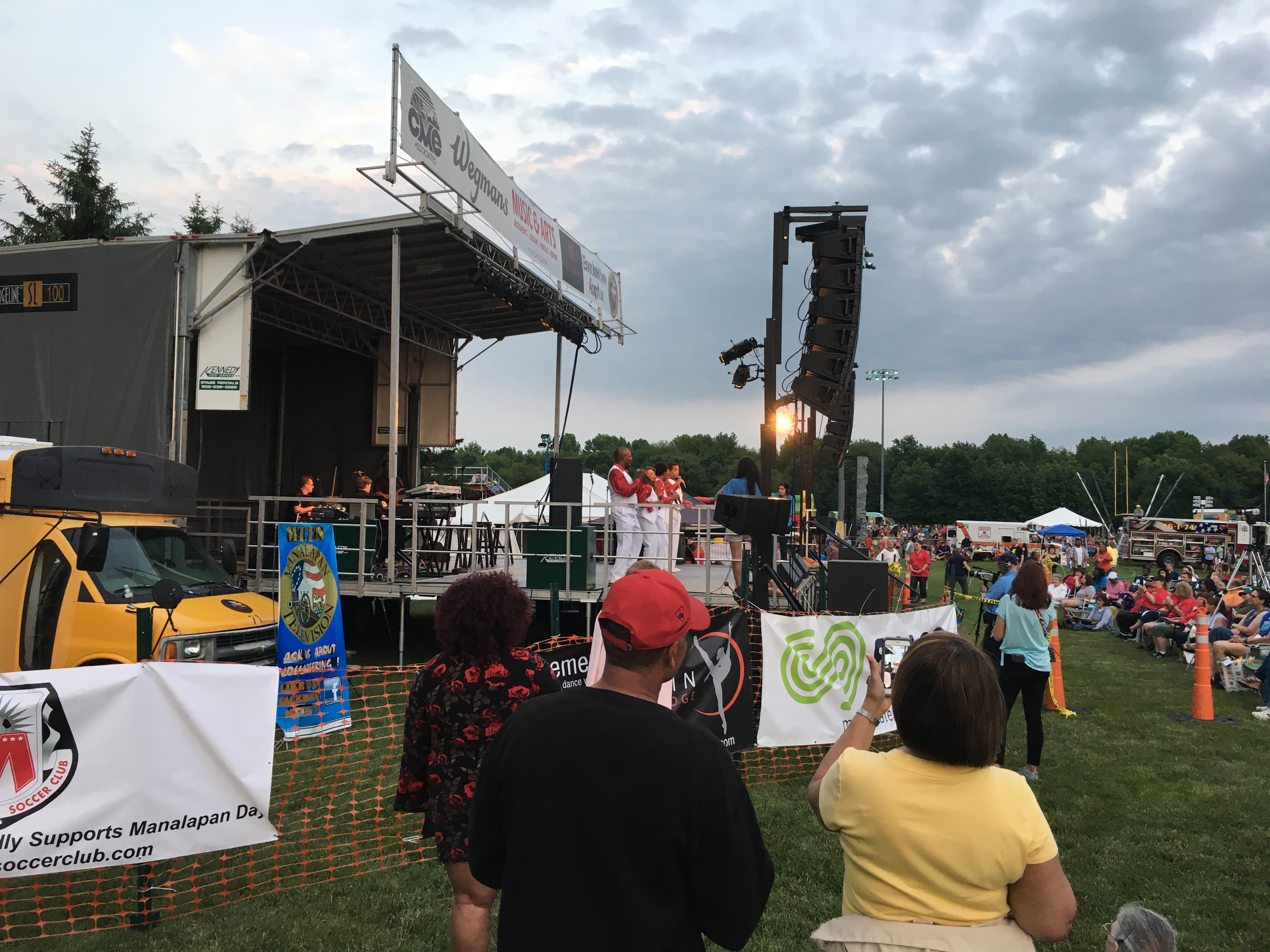
Florence LaRue and The 5th Dimension performing a free outdoor concert in Manalapan, New Jersey in 2018

As of April 2009, the group was actively touring as "The 5th Dimension featuring Florence LaRue," led by LaRue, with Willie Williams, Leonard Tucker, Patrice Morris and Floyd Smith.

On June 21, 2016, The 5th Dimension featuring Florence LaRue performed in The Villages, Florida, just days after the Orlando nightclub shooting. LaRue took the opportunity to share her thoughts on the shooting: "We will not be terrorized. We know what's happening in the world, but this is a song about good health, love, peace, and happiness. We still believe in those things today," she stated before the group performed "Aquarius/Let the Sunshine In".

In November 2017, The 5th Dimension appeared for 18 performances at the Andy Williams Performing Arts Center in Branson, Missouri, in the Andy Williams Christmas Extravaganza hosted by Jimmy Osmond.

== Legacy and critical reception ==
For a brief period in the late 1960s, the 5th Dimension fully realized the post-racial crossover success that [Motown's] Gordy had imagined for his stars, while raising the legitimate question of what it means to sound Black in music.

To listen to the 5th Dimension was to hear a mélange of middle-of-the road Pop, show-tunes, folk music, with flourishes of Jazz, Soul, and a tinge of Gospel. If music were to sound like America, it might sound like the 5th Dimension – at least in the 1960s.

— David Brown

But in a scenario that's nearly impossible to imagine for a modern act, the 5th Dimension also became victims of their own success. In an extended Summer of Soul [film] segment, Davis and Marilyn McCoo, the group's most prominent female member, rewatch the footage with equal degrees pride and pain. "We were constantly being attacked because we weren't 'black enough,'" McCoo says. "Sometimes we were called the black group with the white sound, and we didn't like that. ... Our voices sound the way they sound. How do you color a sound?" As Davis adds, "Everyone thought we were a white act until they saw pictures." Those poignant moments recall similar put-downs that Whitney Houston endured two decades later, after she began pulling in both black and white audiences with her first two albums.

— Mark Anthony Neal

Playing a show at the White House for then U.S. president Richard Nixon in 1970 only cemented the idea that they were part of the establishment, though LaRue, the only original member who still tours under the 5th Dimension name, has said they were not fans of Nixon. "It was an honor to perform for the president of the United States, [but he] wasn't necessarily the president of our choice." No matter; they couldn't undo what we would now call the reputational damage, despite the fact that one of the songs they played at the White House was "The Declaration", a powerful folk-pop appeal for racial unity.

[The medley of "The Declaration/A Change Is Gonna Come/People Gotta Be Free" was recorded for the Portrait album. The United States Declaration of Independence as written by Thomas Jefferson is sung by the group before segueing into Sam Cooke's socially-conscious "A Change Is Gonna Come." The musical treatment of "The Declaration" was first created for the play "Bread, Beans and Things." The recorded version by The 5th Dimension was refused play on Armed Forces radio during the Vietnam era "as they felt it depicted overthrowing the government".]

— Caroline Sullivan

=== Contribution of the composers ===
The 5th Dimension recorded songs by a wide variety of artists, many of whom were well known in the music industry of the era: Harry Nilsson, John Phillips, Paul Anka, Elton John and Bernie Taupin, Neil Sedaka, Paul Williams and Roger Nichols, as well as Lennon and McCartney, and George Harrison of The Beatles. They recorded a small number of Burt Bacharach and Hal David-penned songs, most notably "One Less Bell to Answer" and "Living Together, Growing Together" (the CD rarity track, "As Long as There's an Apple Tree" was never released on album). Lamonte McLemore of The 5th Dimension contributed lyrics and melody on two recordings, "A Love Like Ours" and "The Singer".

The vocal group also recorded multiple songs by lesser known artists such as Motown's Willie Hutch (Hutchison), an American singer, songwriter and producer who supplied them with some of the more funky, soulful songs in their repertoire. Jeffrey Comanor, an American singer-songwriter and actor, provided the group with at least seven of their more memorable album tracks and single B sides. They also recorded a couple of songs by the celebrated British composer Tony Macaulay, one of which, "(Last Night) I Didn't Get to Sleep at All," was a major hit.

Some of the songwriters who worked with The 5th Dimension went on to establish successful performance careers of their own, notably Ashford & Simpson, who wrote the song "California Soul". The group is also notable for having more success with the songs of Laura Nyro than Nyro did herself, particularly with "Stoned Soul Picnic", "Sweet Blindness", "Wedding Bell Blues", "Blowin' Away" and "Save the Country". The same was true for Jimmy Webb, an American singer-songwriter and arranger who won far more accolades supplying songs to artists like Johnny Rivers, Glen Campbell, Judy Collins, Art Garfunkel, Nina Simone, Thelma Houston, The Supremes and even Frank Sinatra and the actor Richard Harris, than he did for his own solo releases. He would become the group's most prolific contributor. Webb wrote the first significant hit for both The 5th Dimension and himself: 1967's "Up, Up and Away". The group's 1967 LP, The Magic Garden, features an 11 track song-cycle composed by Webb. In all, the original lineup of The 5th Dimension recorded 24 different Jimmy Webb compositions by the end of 1975, most with his instrumental arrangements.

=== Contribution of producer "Bones" Howe and session musicians ===
All but two of The 5th Dimension's original albums were produced by Bones Howe, who had been a sound engineer for the likes of Frank Sinatra, Bobby Darin, Mel Torme, Johnny Rivers and Phil Spector, before producing and engineering hits for a number of young, contemporary acts, including The Association, The Turtles and The Mamas & the Papas. Howe employed members of the "Wrecking Crew" on all of The 5th Dimension recordings under his direction. (The Wrecking Crew provided backing or replacement instrumentation for many bands recording in Los Angeles whose own musicianship skills were deemed not of a professional level by their record producer - a common practice of the era). In the case of The 5th Dimension, there were no backing musicians for the vocal group so the Wrecking Crew became their de facto accompanists and instrumental arrangers. The contributions of the rhythm section in particular (consisting of Joe Osborn on bass, Hal Blaine on drums, and Larry Bunker on percussion) on these recordings are notable: Osborn and Blaine opting to be the rhythm section on most every 5th Dimension album and single recorded up through 1975. And their Wrecking Crew cohort, keyboardist/guitarist Larry Knechtel, was a constant presence as well. Being able to rely upon the same producer and group of musicians helped to give The 5th Dimension recordings a distinct and cohesive sound from album to album. Most other purely vocal groups of the time were stuck working with whoever got assigned to individual recording sessions—and didn't have much say in it.

Vocal arrangements on The 5th Dimension albums were handled by Bob Alcivar, an American music producer, arranger, composer, conductor and keyboard player.

== Honors ==
The group was inducted into the Vocal Group Hall of Fame in 2002.

The 5th Dimension was inducted into the Grammy Hall of Fame in 2003 for the 1967 single "Up, Up and Away".

The original lineup of The 5th Dimension performed for the U.S. president, staff, and invitees at the White House in 1970 and 1972.

The Florence LaRue–led group later performed again at the White House in September 1982.

The group was invited by the U.S. State Department to represent the country as part of the US Cultural Exchange Program in 1973. This involved a Goodwill Tour of Eastern Europe, giving concerts and talks in Ankara and Istanbul, Turkey; Bucharest and Ploesti, Romania; Warsaw and Katowice, Poland; and Ostrava, Bratislava, and Prague in Czechoslovakia.

The group has a star on the Hollywood Walk of Fame, inducted August 9, 1991, and the St. Louis Walk of Fame, inducted on March 18, 2010.

== Membership ==
=== Original members ===
- Marilyn McCoo (born September 30, 1943, Jersey City, New Jersey)
- Florence LaRue (born February 4, 1942 Philadelphia, Pennsylvania)
- Billy Davis Jr. (born June 26, 1938, St. Louis, Missouri)
- Lamonte McLemore (born September 17, 1935, St. Louis, Missouri, died February 3, 2026, of natural causes, Las Vegas, Nevada)
- Ronald L. "Ron" Townson, nicknamed "Sweets" (born January 20, 1933, St. Louis, Missouri, died August 2, 2001, of kidney failure, Las Vegas, Nevada)

=== Current members ===
- Florence LaRue (1966–present)
- Sidney Jacobs (1998–present)
- Leonard Tucker (2006–present)
- Patrice Morris (2008–present)
- Floyd Smith (2009–present)

=== Former members ===
- Lamonte McLemore (1966–2006)
- Ronald L. "Ron" Townson (1966–1978, 1980–1997)
- Marilyn McCoo (1966–1975)
- Billy Davis Jr. (1966–1975)
- Eloise Laws (1975)
- Danny Beard (1975–1978)
- Marjorie Barnes (1976–1977)
- Terri Bryant (1978–1979)
- Mic Bell (1978–1979)
- Lou Courtney (1978–1979)
- Pat Bass (1979)
- Tanya Boyd (1979)
- Joyce Wright Pierce (1979–1986 and 1987)
- Michael Procter (1979–1988)
- Ron Townson (1979–1997)
- Estrelita (1986)
- Phyllis Battle (1988–2001)
- Eugene Barry-Hill (1989–1992)
- Greg Walker (1993–2006)
- Cydney Davis (1996)
- Willie Williams (1998–2018)
- Van Jewell (2002, 2005)
- Julie Delgado (2002–2005)
- Jamila Ajibade (2005–2006 and 2007–2008)
- Valerie Davis (2006–2007)
- Jennifer Leigh Warren (2007)
- Gwyn Foxx (December 2007)
- Michael Mishaw (2006–2008)

Original lineup	Florence LaRue	Marilyn McCoo	Billy Davis Jr.	Lamonte McLemore	Ron Townson
1966–75	Florence LaRue	Marilyn McCoo	Billy Davis Jr.	Lamonte McLemore	Ron Townson
1975	Florence LaRue	Eloise Laws	Danny Beard	Lamonte McLemore	Ron Townson
1976–76	Florence LaRue	Marjorie Barnes	Danny Beard	Lamonte McLemore	Ron Townson
1978	Florence LaRue	Terri Bryant	Danny Beard	Lamonte McLemore	Ron Townson
1978–79	Florence LaRue	Terri Bryant	Lou Courtney	Lamonte McLemore	Mic Bell
1979	Florence LaRue	Pat Bass/ Tanya Boyd/ Joyce Wright Pierce	Lou Courtney	Lamonte McLemore	Mic Bell
1979	Florence LaRue	Pat Bass/ Tanya Boyd/ Joyce Wright Pierce	Michael Procter	Lamonte McLemore	Mic Bell
1980–86	Florence LaRue	Joyce Wright Pierce	Michael Procter	Lamonte McLemore	Ron Townson
1986	Florence LaRue	Estrelita	Michael Procter	Lamonte McLemore	Ron Townson
1987	Florence LaRue	Joyce Wright Pierce	Michael Procter	Lamonte McLemore	Ron Townson
1988	Florence LaRue	Phyllis Battle	Michael Procter	Lamonte McLemore	Ron Townson
1989–92	Florence LaRue	Phyllis Battle	Eugene Barry Hill	Lamonte McLemore	Ron Townson
1993–98	Florence LaRue	Phyllis Battle	Greg Walker	Lamonte McLemore	Ron Townson
1998–2002	Florence LaRue	Phyllis Battle	Greg Walker	Lamonte McLemore	Sidney Jacobs
2002	Florence LaRue	Van Jewell	Greg Walker	Lamonte McLemore	Sidney Jacobs
2002–05	Florence LaRue	Julie Delgado	Greg Walker	Lamonte McLemore	Sidney Jacobs
2005	Florence LaRue	Van Jewell	Greg Walker	Lamonte McLemore	Sidney Jacobs
2005–06	Florence LaRue	Jamila Ajibade	Greg Walker	Lamonte McLemore	Sidney Jacobs
2006–07	Florence LaRue	Valerie Davis	Leonard Tucker	Michael Mishaw	Sidney Jacobs
2007	Florence LaRue	Jennifer Lee Warren/ Gwyn Foxx	Leonard Tucker	Michael Mishaw	Sidney Jacobs
2008	Florence LaRue	Patrice Morris	Leonard Tucker	Michael Mishaw	Sidney Jacobs
2009–present	Florence LaRue	Patrice Morris	Leonard Tucker	Floyd Smith	Sidney Jacobs

== Discography ==
- Up, Up and Away (1967)
- The Magic Garden (1968)
- Stoned Soul Picnic (1968)
- The Age of Aquarius (1969)
- Portrait (1970)
- Love's Lines, Angles and Rhymes (1971)
- Individually & Collectively (1972)
- Living Together, Growing Together (1973)
- Soul & Inspiration (1974)
- Earthbound (1975)
- Star Dancing (1978)
- High on Sunshine (1979)
- In the House (1995)

== Publications ==
- The Encyclopedia of Pop, Rock & Soul (revised edition); Irwin Stambler; 1989; St. Martin's Press, New York
- All Music Guide to Soul: The Definitive Guide to R&B and Soul; Vladimir Bogdanov; 2003; Rowman & Littlefield Publishers / Backbeat Books, San Francisco
- From Hobo Flats to the 5th Dimension: A Life Fulfilled in Baseball, Photography and Music; LaMonte McLemore; 2015; The Soul of the Voice, Ltd.
- Up, Up, and Away: How We Found Love, Faith, and Lasting Marriage in the Entertainment World; Marilyn McCoo and Billy Davis Jr., with Mike Yorkey; 2004; Northfield Publishing, New York
- Hal Blaine & The Wrecking Crew; Hal Blaine & David Goggin; 2003; Rebeats Publications, Alma

Chapter: "Jimmy Webb and The 5th Dimension"

- The Cake and the Rain; Jimmy Webb; 2017; St. Martin's Press, New York

See anecdotes starting on pages 156 and 199. Unfortunately, Webb's book ends with 1973 and doesn't cover his reunion album with The 5th Dimension, "Earthbound", recorded in 1975.
