= Ronald Townson =

American singer (1933–2001)

Ron Townson
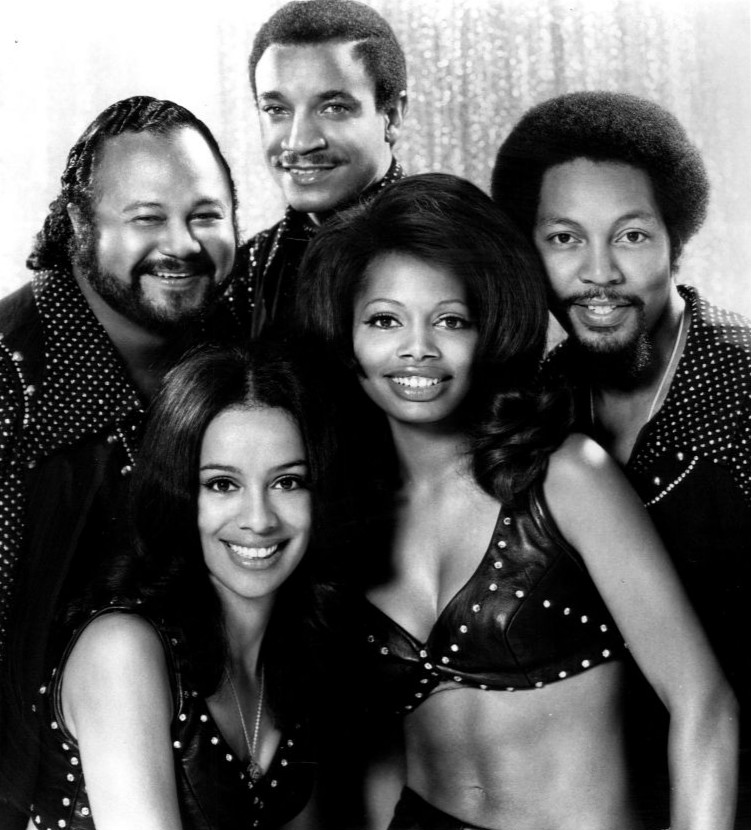
- Townson (left) with the 5th Dimension, 1971

Background information
- Born: Ronald Townson; January 29, 1933; St. Louis, Missouri, U.S.
- Died: August 2, 2001 (aged 68) Las Vegas, Nevada, U.S.
- Genres: Pop music
- Occupations: Singer, actor
- Formerly of: The 5th Dimension

Ronald Townson (January 29, 1933 – August 2, 2001) was an American vocalist. He was an original member of The 5th Dimension, a popular vocal group of the late 1960s and early 1970s.

== Family background ==
Townson was married to Bobette and had two sons, Kim and Kyle. Raised Methodist, he began taking an interest in his wife's Jehovah's Witnesses faith in the early 1980s. Prior to that, it had caused friction within their marriage.

== Biography ==
Townson was born in St. Louis, Missouri. He started singing at age six and was a featured soloist on various choirs throughout his school years. His grandmother inspired him to sing and his parents arranged for him to have private singing and acting lessons. During high school, he appeared for three seasons in productions of Bloomer Girl, Annie Get Your Gun, and Show Boat. He also won third place in the Missouri State trials for the Metropolitan Opera.

Townson toured with Wings Over Jordan for eight years while still in school and was their choir director for two years. He worked his way through Lincoln University in Jefferson City, Missouri, by conducting the university and church choirs; he also played football and ran track in college. At some stage he was in Canada playing professional football.

Townson left St. Louis to pursue a musical career in Los Angeles. He met Dorothy Dandridge and toured with her for two years, took part in the Samuel Goldwyn motion-picture production of Porgy & Bess, and toured with Nat King Cole. He also organized and conducted his own 35-voice a cappella choir in Los Angeles.

In 1965, Townson and fellow St. Louis natives Billy Davis Jr. and Lamonte McLemore joined female vocalists Marilyn McCoo and Florence LaRue to form The Versatiles. The name was a reference to their varied style in music, but producer Johnny Rivers thought the name was outdated. He wanted a newer sounding name for the group, and they soon came up with The 5th Dimension. They began cutting records for Rivers' Soul City Records music label that year.

In 1976, after ten successful years with the 5th Dimension, Townson left the group. In subsequent years he made a guest appearance on the TV series Switch, cut records, performed solo, and formed his own group, Ron Townson and Wild Honey. He also managed five-piece soul/funk vocal group Creative Source, who enjoyed moderate success between 1973 and 1977. From 1977 to 1980, he pursued his interest in classical music. With the encouragement of group member Florence LaRue Townson rejoined the 5th Dimension in 1980.

In 1981, he and fellow group members Joyce Wright Pierce, Michael Procter, Florence LaRue, and Lamonte McLemore starred in Fats Waller's Ain't Misbehavin' to excellent reviews. In 1990, the original five members of the group reunited for a New Year's Eve performance in Atlantic City, New Jersey. It was a huge success. In 1991, they went on the road for some performances billed as The Original 5th Dimension. That year, the group received a star on the Hollywood Walk of Fame. In 1992, Townson appeared in the Warner Brothers film The Mambo Kings.

Townson left the 5th Dimension for good in 1997. He involved himself with other business ventures and served on the board of directors of the Cambridge-Kilpatrick Acting School. He was honored at Lincoln University with the school's Distinguished Alumni Award.

== Death ==
In 1999, Townson moved to Las Vegas and died in his home on August 2, 2001, of kidney failure after a four-year battle with kidney disease. A service was held on August 11, 2001, at the Kingdom Hall of Jehovah's Witnesses.
