= Soul City Records (American label) =

American record label

Soul City Records is an American record label founded by the singer Johnny Rivers in 1966. The most notable acts on Soul City were The 5th Dimension, Al Wilson and Rivers himself. The label was distributed by Liberty Records, which is now part of Capitol Records and Universal Music Group. With the help of David Geffen, Rivers sold the label’s catalog (but not the rights to the name) to Bell Records in 1970. Rivers' 1977 hit "Swayin to the Music (Slow Dancin')" on Big Tree Records bore the Soul City logo. Rivers reactivated the label in 1988 to issue his own recordings, hence making Soul City a private boutique label. To date, Rivers is its only recording artist.
