= Impressions (Laura Nyro album) =

Compilation album by Laura Nyro
- Released: 1980
- Recorded: New York City, 1966–1970
- Genre: Pop
- Label: Embassy (UK)
- Producer: Laura Nyro, Herb Bernstein, Milt Okun, Roy Halee, Felix Cavaliere, Charlie Calello, Arif Mardin

Laura Nyro chronology
| Nested (1978) | Impressions (1980) | Mother's Spiritual (1984) |

Professional ratings
Review scores
| Source | Rating |
|---|---|
| Allmusic | 3/5 stars |

Impressions is the first compilation retrospective album by Bronx-born singer, songwriter, and pianist Laura Nyro.

It was released in the UK in 1980 and features material from her first four albums for Verve and Columbia Records, completely omitting material after 1970.

The album was released seemingly without Nyro's approval or knowledge, at the time Nyro was in a period of semi-retirement, living with her young son in Danbury, but flopped and Impressions remains out of print, having never been issued on CD. She did not release another album until 1984. Nyro curated her own retrospective album, Stoned Soul Picnic: The Best of Laura Nyro, shortly before her death in 1997.

== Overview ==
Impressions brings together both some of Nyro's best-known songs and also hidden gems, making it more adventurous than standard retrospectives and more representative of her work - but despite its 1980 release date, only included material from her first four albums - More Than A New Discovery (1967), Eli and the Thirteenth Confession (1968), New York Tendaberry (1969), and Christmas and the Beads of Sweat (1970).

Impressions was not a commercial success and remains rare and out-of-print.

== Analysis ==
Impressions leans strongly on material from Nyro's second opus, 1968's Eli and the Thirteenth Confession, which became a cult favourite. Her debut album More Than A New Discovery features the majority of her best-known work, and three songs from the album are featured here, with the same number from 1970's more mystical Christmas and the Beads of Sweat, while two tracks from her sole US Top 40 hit, 1969's stark New York Tendaberry are included.

== Track listing ==
All tracks composed by Laura Nyro

| Track | Original album |
|---|---|
| "Map to the Treasure" | Christmas and the Beads of Sweat (1970) |
| "Captain Saint Lucifer" | New York Tendaberry (1969) |
| "Christmas In My Soul" | Christmas and the Beads of Sweat (1970) |
| "Wedding Bell Blues" | More Than A New Discovery (1967) |
| "Stoned Soul Picnic" | Eli and the Thirteenth Confession (1968) |
| "Save the Country" | New York Tendaberry (1969) |
| "Sweet Blindness" | Eli and the Thirteenth Confession (1968) |
| "The Confession" | Eli and the Thirteenth Confession (1968) |
| "Beads of Sweat" | Christmas and the Beads of Sweat (1970) |
| "And When I Die" | More Than A New Discovery (1967) |
| "Eli's Comin'" | Eli and the Thirteenth Confession (1968) |
| "Stoney End" | More Than A New Discovery (1967) |
| "Emmie" | Eli and the Thirteenth Confession (1968) |
