= Laura: Live at the Bottom Line =

Live album by Laura Nyro
- Released: October 1989
- Recorded: summer 1988
- Venue: The Bottom Line, New York City
- Length: 62:17
- Label: Cypress
- Producer: Laura Nyro, Jimmy Vivino

Laura Nyro chronology
Mother's Spiritual (1984)	Laura: Live at the Bottom Line (1989)	Walk the Dog and Light the Light (1993)

Professional ratings
Review scores
Source	Rating
Allmusic	link

Laura: Live at the Bottom Line is the second live album by New York City-born singer, songwriter, and pianist Laura Nyro and her tenth original album in total, including the 1977 live album Season of Lights.

Nyro's long-time label Columbia Records wanted a brand new studio album from Nyro, who had stayed with the label despite not having had a reasonable commercial success for well over a decade. Instead, she decided she wanted to go on the road and record a new live album.

Columbia did not approve, and a deal was negotiated allowing Nyro to release the live album on a different label, Cypress, before returning to Columbia for another studio album.

Live at the Bottom Line was recorded at New York's famous intimate venue, The Bottom Line, and mixes some of Nyro's famous compositions with newer ones and also previously unreleased songs.

== Track listing ==
All tracks composed by Laura Nyro; except where indicated

Track	Original album
"The Confession"	Eli and the Thirteenth Confession (1968)
"High-Heeled Sneakers" (Robert Higginbottom)	previously unreleased cover
"Roll of the Ocean"	previously unreleased
"Companion"	previously unreleased
"The Wild World"	previously unreleased
"My Innocence/Sophia"	Nested (1978) / Mother's Spiritual (1984)
"To a Child"	Mother's Spiritual (1984)
"And When I Die"	More Than A New Discovery (1967)
"Park Song"	previously unreleased
"Broken Rainbow"	previously unreleased / written in 1985
"Women of the One World"	previously unreleased
"Emmie"	Eli and the Thirteenth Confession (1968)
"Wedding Bell Blues"	More Than A New Discovery (1967)
"The Japanese Restaurant Song"	previously unreleased
"Stoned Soul Picnic"	Eli and the Thirteenth Confession (1968)
"La La Means I Love You / Trees of the Ages / Up on the Roof" (Thom Bell, William Hart / Nyro / Gerry Goffin, Carole King)	previously unreleased cover / Mother's Spiritual (1984) / Christmas and the Beads of Sweat (1970)

The song "Broken Rainbow" had been written and recorded for an Oscar-nominated documentary of the same name in 1985, and was included in re-recorded form on 1993's Walk the Dog and Light the Light.

The final song is a medley.

== Personnel ==
- Laura Nyro - voice, keyboards
- Jimmy Vivino - guitar, mandolin, co-producer
- David Wofford - bass
- Frank Pagano - drums
- Nydia "Liberty" Mata - percussion
- Diane Wilson, Frank Pagano, Jimmy Vivino - harmony vocals
- Recorded and mixed by Mark Linett
