= Mother's Spiritual =

Studio album by Laura Nyro
- Released: January 1984
- Recorded: Danbury, 1983
- Genre: Pop
- Length: 44:53
- Label: Columbia
- Producers: Laura Nyro, Todd Rundgren, Nydia Mata

Laura Nyro chronology
Impressions (1980)	Mother's Spiritual (1984)	Laura: Live at the Bottom Line (1989)

Mother's Spiritual is the eighth studio album by New York City-born singer, songwriter, and pianist Laura Nyro and her ninth original album in total, including the 1977 live album Season of Lights.

The album was released at the beginning of 1984 after a year of difficult and expensive recording sessions, and came more than five years after its predecessor, 1978's well-received but poor-selling Nested. Thanks to a small buzz surrounding Nyro's return to the spotlight after her second period of semi-retirement (the first came from 1972 to 1975), Mother's Spiritual became Nyro's last US chart entry, reaching No. 182 on the Billboard 200 chart.

Musically, Mother's Spiritual is the most serene and easygoing of all Laura Nyro albums, and was criticised in some quarters for being too sedate and maternal in comparison to her wild, adventurous, and experimental albums such as Eli and the Thirteenth Confession and New York Tendaberry.

Thematically, Nyro's concerns turned from passion and love towards subjects of a more political and sociological nature, including environmentalism, motherhood, and feminism. It met with mixed reviews, and Nyro was lambasted in some quarters for "turning into a tree-hugger."

After being out of print in the U.S. for many years, Mother's Spiritual was finally released on CD in 2009. It was her last studio album for nine years, and she returned only in 1988 to stage a tour. The album represents Nyro's sole original output of the 1980s, during which time she concentrated mostly on raising her son Gil, born in 1978.

== Background ==
The recording of Mother's Spiritual was punctuated by several difficult incidences. Nyro intended to record the album, as with predecessor Nested, at her Danbury home and laid down solo demos of the songs as early as the spring of 1982. Then, Nyro spent 3 to 4 days a week over eight weeks recording at The Boogie Hotel on Long Island, NY, with recording engineer and studio owner Jeffrey Kawalek at the board, and producer Joe Wissert commuting from California for the sessions - but Nyro was not satisfied with the outcome of the music.

So she then spent between $150,000 and $200,000 building a proper studio at her home (as opposed to the mobile studio where Nested was recorded) and continued recording with Roscoe Harring as co-producer.

The album's arrangements are soft and wistful, but Nyro also desired a more fiery edge to the songs as well. Longtime fan Todd Rundgren, however, was not particularly encouraging about Nyro's new sound and soon aborted his role as producer having cited her indecisive and languid approach as factors.

Nyro's younger brother, Jan Nigro, plays acoustic guitar on the album.

== Critical reception ==
Professional ratings
Review scores
Source	Rating
AllMusic	2/5 stars
Robert Christgau	C+

In a contemporary review for The Village Voice, music critic Robert Christgau facetiously remarked that the "romantic generalizations of matrifocal ecofeminism " are suitable to Nyro's moody, gushy style, while citing her "still arresting" dynamics.

== Track listing ==
All songs by Laura Nyro.

1. "To a Child" – 3:53
2. "The Right to Vote" – 3:02
3. "A Wilderness" – 2:56
4. "Melody in the Sky" – 3:45
5. "Late for Love" – 2:57
6. "A Free Thinker" – 3:15
7. "Man in the Moon" – 2:55
8. "Talk to a Green Tree" – 3:44
9. "Trees of the Ages" – 3:39
10. "The Brighter Song" – 2:30
11. "Roadnotes" – 3:18
12. "Sophia" – 4:29
13. "Mother's Spiritual" – 3:12
14. "Refrain" – 1:08
15. (Bonus Track) "Man in the Moon" (live) – 3:28, bonus track on Japanese import and special edition.

== Personnel ==
According to Discogs:

- Laura Nyro - voice, harmonies, acoustic and electric pianos, dulcimer on "Sophia"
- Jan Nigro - Acoustic Guitar
- Lisa Sunshine - Bass
- John Bistro - Electric Guitar
- Nydia "Liberty" Mata - Percussion

Production

- Laura Nyro - Mixer
- Todd Rundgren - Co-Producer
- Roscoe Harring - Engineer
- Arthur Kelm - Engineer, Mixer
- Chris Andersen - Engineer, Mixer
- Barbra Cobb - Mixer
- Nydia Mata - Mixer

Art

- Jo Mannino Hockenhull - Artwork
- Zeppelin Graphics - Design, Research, Art Directions
