= Season of Lights =

Live album by Laura Nyro
- Released: June 1977
- Recorded: Various locations, 1976
- Length: 69:39 (double LP); 41:00 (single LP)
- Label: Columbia
- Producer: Laura Nyro

Laura Nyro chronology
Smile (1976)	Season of Lights (1977)	Nested (1978)

Professional ratings
Review scores
Source	Rating
AllMusic	link
Christgau's Record Guide	B−

Season of Lights... Laura Nyro in Concert is the first live album by American singer-songwriter Laura Nyro.

== Overview ==
Columbia Records issued the album in the summer of 1977, taking the songs from various locations on Nyro's 1976 tour in support of her most recent studio album, Smile. Although the album had no strict producer, Nyro is credited as the "musical director." Dale Ashby was engineer and mixer, assisted by Don Pulse and Ken Robertson.

The album documents Nyro's first full-band tour, with her playing guitar, piano, and other keyboards, backed by a group of musicians including John Tropea on guitar and Richard Davis on bass. The atmosphere of the album is laid back, smooth, and jazz-inspired, musically similar to the explorations on Smile. Nyro re-arranged many songs to fit her new band's sound, such as slowing down "Sweet Blindness" or making "And When I Die" funkier.

The album was originally intended to be a double-LP set consisting of 16 songs, and this version was sent to some outlets as a promotional copy and as a Japanese import. Instead, Columbia released a single-LP set of 10 songs. Reissue imprint Iconoclassic Records released a remastered version of Season of Lights, including all sixteen songs plus a bonus solo version of "Timer," on CD in August 2008.

The album peaked at No. 137 on the Billboard 200 chart, then known as the Pop Albums chart. It was Nyro's penultimate US chart entry after a run of seven successive charting albums stretching back to 1968's Eli and the Thirteenth Confession, before her final chart entry in 1984.

== Track listing (standard single vinyl version) ==
All tracks composed by Laura Nyro

Track	Length	Original album
"The Confession"	3:11	Eli and the Thirteenth Confession (1968)
"And When I Die"	4:03	More Than A New Discovery (1967)
"Upstairs By A Chinese Lamp"	4:56	Christmas and the Beads of Sweat (1970)
"Sweet Blindness"	3:47	Eli and the Thirteenth Confession (1968)
"Captain Saint Lucifer"	5:55	New York Tendaberry (1969)
"Money"	6:04	Smile (1976)
"The Cat Song"	4:22	Smile (1976)
"When I Was a Freeport and You Were the Main Drag"	3:42	Christmas and the Beads of Sweat (1970)
"Timer"	6:15	Eli and the Thirteenth Confession (1968)
"Emmie"	3:56	Eli and the Thirteenth Confession (1968)

== Track listing (original double-vinyl version and Iconoclassic 2008 CD remaster) ==
Track	Length	Original album
"Money"	6:04	Smile (1976)
"Sweet Lovin' Baby"	2:20	New York Tendaberry (1969)
"And When I Die"	4:03	More Than A New Discovery (1967)
"The Morning News"	2:32	previously unreleased
"Upstairs By A Chinese Lamp"	4:56	Christmas and the Beads of Sweat (1970)
"I Am the Blues"	7:00	Smile (1976)
"When I Was a Freeport and You Were the Main Drag"	3:42	Christmas and the Beads of Sweat (1970)
"Captain Saint Lucifer"	5:55	New York Tendaberry (1969)
"Smile"	4:07	Smile (1976)
"Mars"	3:24	Smile (1976) – coda to "Smile"
"Sweet Blindness"	3:47	Eli and the Thirteenth Confession (1968)
"The Cat Song"	4:22	Smile(1976)
"Emmie"	3:56	Eli and the Thirteenth Confession (1968)
"The Confession"	3:11	Eli and the Thirteenth Confession (1968)
"Timer"	6:15	Eli and the Thirteenth Confession (1968)
"Midnite Blue"	4:05	Smile (1976)

== Personnel ==
- Laura Nyro – vocals, piano, musical director
- John Tropea – electric guitar
- Richard Davis – bass
- Andy Newmark – drums
- Carter "C.C." Collins – percussion
- Nydia Mata – congas
- Mike Mainieri – clavinet, marimba, vibraphone
- Jean Fineberg, Jeff King – saxophone
- Ellen Seeling – trumpet

Technical

- Recorded by Dale Ashby
- Mixed by Don Puluse and Ron Johnsen
- Cover painting by Rokuro Taniuchi
