= Angel in the Dark =

Studio album by Laura Nyro
- Released: March 20, 2001
- Recorded: 1994, 1995
- Studios: Gallway Bay, New York City; Magic Shop, New York City; Power Station, New York City; River Sound, New York City
- Length: 56:24
- Language: English
- Label: Rounder
- Producers: Scott Billington; Laura Nyro; Eileen Silver-Lilywhite

Laura Nyro chronology
Live from Mountain Stage (2000)	Angel in the Dark (2001)	Live: The Loom's Desire (2002)

Angel in the Dark is a 2001 album from American singer-songwriter Laura Nyro, released after her death and made up of recordings from 1994 and 1995.

== Recording and release ==
Nyro recorded the album while undergoing chemotherapy for the ovarian cancer that ultimately resulted in her death in 1997; the recordings were not completed. The songs are her final recording sessions and were initially planned for release on a small independent label before being handed over to Rounder Records for a broader release and promotion of Nyro's career.

== Critical reception ==
The editors of AllMusic Guide scored this album four out of five stars, with reviewer Ronnie D. Lankford Jr. calling the album "a lovely recording featuring the graceful vocals and finely crafted songs that everyone expects from Laura Nyro" and "a fine coda, perfect for late-night listening, and a perfect companion to Nyro's other recordings". In The Austin Chronicle, Margaret Moser situates the release as part of Nyro's reflection on her impending death, noting that the cover versions include her influences and the original tracks discuss the most important themes in her life and music. Writing for Billboard, Michael Padletta called the album "aptly titled" for Nyro's "achingly beautiful" vocals, with her career as a songwriter being as accomplished as her influences present on this collection. His colleague Jim Bessman named it the top album of 2001.

== Track listing ==
1. "Angel in the Dark" (Nyro) – 4:04
2. "Triple Goddess Twilight" (Nyro) – 3:59
3. "Will You Still Love Me Tomorrow" (Gerry Goffin and Carole King) – 5:59
4. "He Was Too Good to Me" (Lorenz Hart and Richard Rodgers) – 2:36
5. "Sweet Dream Fade" (Nyro) – 4:26
6. "Serious Playground" (Nyro) – 4:17
7. "Be Aware" (Burt Bacharach and Hal David) – 3:01
8. "Let It Be Me" (Gilbert Bécaud and Pierre Delanoë) – 2:13
9. "Gardenia Talk" (Nyro) – 2:44
10. "Ooh Baby, Baby" (Warren "Pete" Moore and Smokey Robinson) – 3:24
11. "Embraceable You" (George Gershwin and Ira Gershwin) – 2:08
12. "La La Means I Love You" (Thom Bell and William Hart) – 4:18
13. "Walk On By" (Bacharach and David) – 2:17
14. "Animal Grace" (Nyro) – 1:27
15. "Don't Hurt Child" (Nyro) – 3:22
16. "Coda" (Nyro) – 1:05
  silence – 3:00
  "Come and Get These Memories" (Holland–Dozier–Holland) – 1:25

A Super Audio CD release from 2002 includes alternate recordings of "Angel in the Dark" (2:41), "Ooh Baby, Baby" (3:29), and "Don't Hurt the Child" (3:30) before "Coda". These were reissued on the 2024 CD box set "Hear My Song: The Collection 1966-1995" on the 19th disc titled "Rarities and Live Recordings".

== Personnel ==
"Angel in the Dark": recorded by Wayne Yurgelin, assisted by Robert Smith, at The Power Station, August 5, 1995, with additional recording by Steve Rosenthal, assisted by Albert Leusink at The Magic Shop

- Laura Nyro – lead and harmony vocals and electric piano
- Michael Brecker – tenor saxophone
- Randy Brecker – trumpet
- Bashiri Johnson – percussion
- Tommy Mitchell – horn arrangement
- Bernard Purdie – drums
- John Tropea – electric guitar and horn arrangement
- Freddie Washington – bass guitar

"Triple Goddess Twilight": recorded by Dan Gellert, assisted by Robert Smith at The Power Station, April 28, 1995

- Laura Nyro – lead and vocal harmonies and acoustic piano

"Will You Still Love Me Tomorrow": recorded by Daryl Gustamaccio, assisted by Robert Smith at The Power Station, August 29, 1994, with production assistance by Peter Gallway

- Laura Nyro – vocals and acoustic piano
- Will Lee – bass guitar
- Chris Parker – drums
- Jeff Pevar – guitar
- Carol Steele – percussion

"He Was Too Good to Me": recorded by Wayne Yurgelin, assisted by T. Gonz at River Sound, October 22, 1994

- Laura Nyro – vocals and acoustic piano

"Sweet Dream Fade": recorded by Wayne Yurgelin, assisted by Robert Smith at The Power Station, August 5, 1995, with additional recording by Steve Rosenthal, assisted by Albert Leusink at The Magic Shop

- Laura Nyro – vocals and electric piano
- Michael Brecker – tenor saxophone
- Randy Brecker – trumpet
- Bashiri Johnson – percussion
- Tommy Mitchell – horn arrangement
- Bernard Purdie – drums
- John Tropea – electric guitar and horn arrangement
- Freddie Washington – bass guitar

"Serious Playground": recorded by Dan Gellert, assisted by Robert Smith at The Power Station, April 28, 1995

- Laura Nyro – lead and vocal harmonies and acoustic piano

"Be Aware": recorded by Daryl Gustamaccio, assisted by Robert Smith at The Power Station, August 30, 1994, with production assistance by Peter Gallway

- Laura Nyro – vocals and acoustic piano
- Will Lee – bass guitar
- Chris Parker – drums
- Jeff Pevar – guitar
- Carol Steele – percussion

"Let It Be Me": recorded by Wayne Yurgelin, assisted by T. Gonz at River Sound, October 22, 1994

- Laura Nyro – vocals and acoustic piano

"Gardenia Talk": recorded by Wayne Yurgelin, assisted by Robert Smith at The Power Station, August 5, 1995, with additional recording by Steve Rosenthal, assisted by Albert Leusink at The Magic Shop

- Laura Nyro – vocals and electric piano
- Bashiri Johnson – percussion
- Bernard Purdie – drums
- John Tropea – electric guitar and horn arrangement
- Freddie Washington – bass guitar

"Ooh Baby, Baby": recorded by Daryl Gustamaccio, assisted by Robert Smith at The Power Station, August 30, 1994, with production assistance by Peter Gallway

- Laura Nyro – vocals and acoustic piano
- Will Lee – bass guitar
- Chris Parker – drums
- Jeff Pevar – guitar
- Carol Steele – percussion

"Embraceable You": recorded by Daryl Gustamaccio, assisted by Robert Smith at The Power Station, August 28, 1994, with production assistance by Peter Gallway

- Laura Nyro – vocals and acoustic piano

"La La Means I Love You": recorded by Daryl Gustamaccio, assisted by Robert Smith at The Power Station, August 29, 1994, with production assistance by Peter Gallway

- Laura Nyro – vocals and electric piano
- Will Lee – bass guitar
- Chris Parker – drums
- Jeff Pevar – guitar
- Carol Steele – percussion

"Walk On By": recorded by Peter Gallway at Gallway Bay Music, March 1994

- Laura Nyro – vocals and electric piano

"Animal Grace": recorded by Dan Gellert, assisted by Robert Smith at The Power Station, April 28, 1995

- Laura Nyro – lead and vocal harmonies and acoustic piano

"Don't Hurt Child": recorded by Wayne Yurgelin, assisted by Robert Smith, at The Power Station, August 5, 1995, with additional recording by Steve Rosenthal, assisted by Albert Leusink at The Magic Shop

- Laura Nyro – lead and harmony vocals and electric piano
- Bashiri Johnson – percussion
- Bernard Purdie – drums
- John Tropea – electric guitar
- Freddie Washington – bass guitar

"Coda": recorded by Wayne Yurgelin, assisted by Robert Smith, at The Power Station, August 5, 1995, with additional recording by Steve Rosenthal, assisted by Albert Leusink at The Magic Shop

- Laura Nyro – lead and harmony vocals and electric piano
- Bashiri Johnson – percussion
- Bernard Purdie – drums

Technical personnel

- Scott Billington – production
- Tom Coyne – mastering at Sterling Sound, New York
- David Gahr – photography
- Dick Kondas – assistant mixing at Sorcerer Sound, New York, August 2000
- Laura Nyro – production
- Steve Rosenthal – mixing at Sorcerer Sound, New York, August 2000
- Eileen Silver-Lilywhite – production
- Jean Wilcox – design and illustration

== Chart performance ==
Angel in the Dark entered the Top Internet Albums chart on July 28, 2001 at 17 and rose to eighth place on August 4.
