= Walk the Dog and Light the Light =

Studio album by Laura Nyro
- Released: August 17, 1993
- Recorded: 1993
- Studio: River Sound, New York
- Length: 36:17
- Label: Columbia
- Producer: Gary Katz, Laura Nyro

Laura Nyro chronology
Laura: Live at the Bottom Line (1989)	Walk the Dog and Light the Light (1993)	Stoned Soul Picnic: The Best of Laura Nyro (1997)

Professional ratings
Review scores
Source	Rating
Allmusic	3/5 stars
Rolling Stone	3/5 stars

Walk the Dog and Light the Light is the ninth studio album by Bronx-born singer, songwriter, and pianist Laura Nyro. It was released in the late summer of 1993, more than nine years after its predecessor, Mother's Spiritual. It followed Nyro's 1989 live album Laura: Live at the Bottom Line, and the atmosphere here is similarly laidback and easygoing.

It was the last album of new original material that Nyro released during her lifetime, although she began recording another album in 1994, which was released in 2001 as Angel in the Dark. Walk the Dog and Light the Light received positive critical notices, and Nyro supported the album with a string of intimate dates with a harmony vocal group.

== Overview ==
Walk the Dog and Light the Light grew out of Nyro's 1988 tour, which resulted in her live album Laura: Live at the Bottom Line. Thus, the music is similarly laidback and features largely the same cast of musicians, including percussionist Nydia "Liberty" Mata, with whom Nyro had collaborated since the mid-1970s.

The album is produced by Nyro with Steely Dan producer Gary Katz. The sound is smooth and soulful, with Nyro's rich and smokier vocals singing her lyrics concerning topics such as feminism, animal rights and Native American rights.

== Track listing ==
All tracks composed by Laura Nyro; except where indicated

1. "Oh Yeah Maybe Baby (The Heebie Jeebies)" (Hank Hunter, Phil Spector) – 3:18
2. "A Woman of the World" – 4:13
3. "The Descent of Luna Rose" – 3:37
4. "Art of Love" – 3:41
5. "Lite a Flame (The Animal Rights Song)" – 3:22
6. "Louise's Church" – 3:37
7. "Broken Rainbow" – 3:57
8. "Walk the Dog and Light the Light (Song of the Road)" – 3:48
9. "To a Child" – 3:32
10. "I'm So Proud/Dedicated to the One I Love" (Curtis Mayfield/Ralph Bass, Lowman Pauling) –3:40

== Personnel ==
- Laura Nyro – lead voice, harmonies, keyboards
- Bernard Purdie – drums
- Freddie Washington – bass guitar
- Jerry Jemmott – bass guitar on "Walk the Dog and Light the Light (Song of the Road)"
- Elliott Randall, Michael Landau, Ira Siegel – guitar
- Bashiri Johnson, Erik McKain – percussion
- Ellen Uryevick – harp
- Juliet Haffner, Sue Pray, Julie Green, Jeanne Le Blanc, Marilyn Wright, Belinda Whitney Barat, Joyce Hammann, Beryl Diamond, Rani Vaz, Laura Seaton, Gene Orloff, Sanford Allen, Mindy Jostyn – strings
- Lou Marini, Roger Rosenberg, Randy Brecker, Lawrence Feldman – horns
- Michael Brecker – saxophone solo
- Lou Marini – flute solo
- Laura Nyro, Carlos Franzetti – string arrangements
- David Frank – horn and flute arrangements, additional production assistant

== In popular culture ==
- The song "Broken Rainbow" had been written and recorded for an Oscar-nominated documentary of the same name in 1985, and was issued in live form on 1989's Laura: Live at the Bottom Line.
- "To a Child" was originally included in a different version on 1984's Mother's Spiritual.

== Bibliography ==
- Michele Kort's biography Soul Picnic: The Music and Passion of Laura Nyro, St. Martin's Griffin (May 2003) – ISBN 0-312-20941-X
