= Live: The Loom's Desire =

Live album by Laura Nyro
- Released: May 7, 2002
- Recorded: December 24, 1993 and December 24, 1994
- Venue: The Bottom Line, Greenwich Village, Manhattan, New York City, New York, United States
- Length: 81:26
- Language: English
- Label: Rounder
- Producer: Laura Nyro

Laura Nyro chronology
Angel in the Dark (2001)	Live: The Loom's Desire (2002)

Live: The Loom's Desire is a posthumous live double album from American singer-songwriter Laura Nyro released by Rounder Records in 2002. The recordings are made up of Christmas Eve shows that she performed in 1993 and 1994 at The Bottom Line and received positive reviews from critics.

== Recording and release ==
Nyro performed at The Bottom Line each Christmas Eve for years and recorded these two sets with the intention of releasing them as an album. The release was interrupted by her diagnosis of and treatment for ovarian cancer, along with her final recording sessions documented on Angel in the Dark. That album as well as these live shows were initially planned for release on a small independent label before being handed over to Rounder Records for a broader release and promotion of Nyro's career.

== Reception ==
Writing for PopMatters, Matt Cibula sums up the recordings as "confident and bold at the same time that she is introspective and cryptic, mysterious and exuberant, the whole package of life wrapped up in one tiny woman who wrote some of the greatest songs of our time". The editorial staff at AllMusic Guide scored the album three out of five stars, with reviewer Thom Jurek calling the album, "as intimate a portrait of Nyro as we are likely to ever get from a recording". In Billboard, Jim Bessman wrote that this set shows Nyro's "incomparable musical resourcefulness". Richard Williams of The Guardian gave this album five out of five stars, summing up his review that "no one ever distilled the essence of uptown soul music with a more exquisite touch". In The Austin Chronicle, Margaret Moser reviewed this album as well as several studio re-releases published around the same time and gave The Loom's Desire three out of five stars, as the album "captures as much of her magic as can be held". Eric Thom of Exclaim! used his review of this album as a brief overview of Nyro's career and calls these recordings "a frighteningly intimate and utterly hypnotic reminder" of the performer's "timeless" body of work.

Angel in the Dark and Live: The Loom's Desire helped reignite interest in Nyro's work, followed by a series of re-releases of her more famous studio albums.

== Track listing ==
1993 Concert

1. "Oh Yeah, Maybe Baby" (Hank Hunter and Phil Spector) – 3:08
2. "Dedicated to the One I Love" (Ralph Bass and Lowman Pauling) – 3:15
3. "Wind" (Bob "Chico" Edwards, Quentin Eubanks, Juan Guitierrez, Willie Hunter, and Nolan Strong) – 2:10
4. "Lite a Flame (The Animal Rights Song)" (Laura Nyro) – 3:31
5. "Walk the Dog and Light the Light (Song of the Road)" (Nyro) – 3:07
6. "To a Child" (Nyro) – 3:26
7. "And When I Die" (Nyro) – 2:49
8. "Japanese Restaurant Song" (Nyro) – 3:49
9. "My Innocence" / "Sophia" (Nyro) – 2:27
10. "Wedding Bell Blues" (Nyro) – 2:21
11. "Art of Love" (Nyro) – 3:35
12. "Emmie" (Nyro) – 4:29
13. "Let It Be Me" (Gilbert Bécaud and Pierre Delanoë) – 3:01

1994 Concert

14. "Angel in the Dark" (Nyro) – 4:22
15. "Gardenia Talk" (Nyro) – 2:52
16. "Save the Country" (Nyro) – 2:39
17. "Louise's Church" (Nyro) – 3:14
18. "Wild World" (Nyro) – 2:35
19. "A Woman of the World" (Nyro) – 4:16
20. "The Descent of Luna Rosé" (Nyro) – 2:50
21. "Broken Rainbow" (Nyro) – 3:52
22. "Blowin' Away" / "Wedding Bell Blues" (Nyro) – 3:39
23. "Trees of the Ages" / "Emmie" (Nyro) – 6:17
24. "Ooh Baby, Baby" (Warren "Pete" Moore and Smokey Robinson) – 3:46

== Personnel ==
- Laura Nyro – vocals, piano, vocal arrangement, production
- Chandra Armstead – harmony vocals (1993 recordings)
- David Bianchini – photography
- Scott Billington – mixing, editing
- Vivian Cherry – harmony vocals (1993 recordings)
- Robin Clark – harmony vocals (1994 recordings)
- Angela Clemmons – harmony vocals (1993 recordings)
- Tom Coyne – mastering
- David Farrell – mixing, editing
- Diane Garisto – harmony vocals (1994 recordings)
- Kooster McAllister – recording (1993 recordings)
- Steven Remote – recording (1994 recordings)
- Eileen Silver-Lillywhite – executive production, liner notes
- Dian Sorel – harmony vocals (1993 recordings)
- Jean Wilcox – design
- Diane Wilson – harmony vocals (1994 recordings)

== See also ==
- List of 2002 albums
