= Streets of Arklow =

Song by Van Morrison

from the album Veedon Fleece
- Released: October 1974
- Recorded: November 1973
- Genre: Folk rock
- Length: 4:22
- Label: Warner Bros.
- Songwriter(s): Van Morrison
- Producer(s): Van Morrison

"Streets of Arklow" is a song by Northern Irish singer-songwriter Van Morrison. It appears on the album Veedon Fleece, released in 1974.

The song describes a perfect day in "God's green land" and is a tribute to the County Wicklow town of Arklow visited during the singer's 1973 vacation trip back to Ireland after being in the United States since 1967.

The song has also been played regularly in concert since 2002 by Morrison. From 2003 to 2009 it was played in a medley with "You Don't Pull No Punches, But You Don't Push the River".

== Appearances on other albums ==
"Streets of Arklow" was re-mastered in 2007 and included on the limited 3CD edition of the compilation album, Still on Top - The Greatest Hits.

In 2015 it appears on Duets: Re-working the Catalogue in a duet with Mick Hucknall.

== Personnel on original release ==
- Van Morrison – guitar, vocal
- Terry Adams – cello
- David Hayes – bass guitar
- James Rothermel – recorder
- Nathan Rubin – violin
- Dahaud Shaar (David Shaw) – drums
- James Trumbo – piano
- Ralph Walsh - guitar
