= Live from Mountain Stage =

Live from Mountain Stage may refer to:

- Live from Mountain Stage (John Hartford recording)
- Live from Mountain Stage (Laura Nyro recording)
