= Stoned Soul Picnic =

Stoned Soul Picnic may refer to:

- Stoned Soul Picnic (The 5th Dimension album), a 1968 album by the 5th Dimension
  - "Stoned Soul Picnic" (song), a 1968 song from the album
- Stoned Soul Picnic (Roy Ayers album), a 1968 album by jazz vibraphonist Roy Ayers
- Stoned Soul Picnic: The Best of Laura Nyro, a 1997 album by Laura Nyro
