= Cul de Sac (song) =

Single by Van Morrison

from the album Veedon Fleece
- A-side: "Bulbs"
- Released: November 1974
- Genre: Folk rock; soul
- Length: 5:51
- Label: Warner Bros.
- Songwriter: Van Morrison
- Producer: Van Morrison

Van Morrison singles chronology
"Ain't Nothing You Can Do" (1974)	"Cul de Sac" (1974)	"Caledonia" (1974)

"Cul de Sac" is a song written by Irish singer-songwriter Van Morrison. It first appeared as the seventh track on Morrison's 1974 album Veedon Fleece, and was released as the B-side to the single "Bulbs".

== Lyrics and instrumentation ==
The song roughly describes traveling on the road, emigration and homecoming. The lyrics are sparse and added lightly, accenting the melody of the song. "Cul de Sac" is performed in 3/4 time. An alternate version was released in 2008, with slightly different lyrics:

== Background and recording ==
"Cul de Sac" was recorded with a separate lineup of musicians than the rest of Veedon Fleece. "Cul de Sac" along with "Bulbs" was recut at Mercury Studios in New York a few months after the main recording for the album took place. It was made with musicians with whom Morrison had never worked before: guitarist John Tropea, bassist Joe Macho and drummer Allen Schwarzberg. It contrasted slightly with the rest of the album as it was given more of a rock music treatment.

== Release and reception ==
"Cul de Sac" was chosen as the B-side to the single "Bulbs", which was released in 1974 as the lead single for Veedon Fleece. In the UK, it was replaced by "Who Was That Masked Man".

In his book Van Morrison: Inarticulate Speech of the Heart, John Collis writes:

"Cul de sac, for example, begins with a close echo of the classic cheating song by Chips Moman and Dan Penn, 'The Dark End of the Street'. A cul de sac may well have a dark end, but the reason for the aural reference remains mysterious"

== Personnel ==
- Van Morrison – vocals
- John Tropea – guitar
- Jef Labes – piano
- Joe Macho – bass
- Allen Schwartzberg – drums
