= Gonna Take a Miracle =

Studio album by Laura Nyro and Labelle
- Released: November 17, 1971
- Recorded: May – June 1971
- Studios: Sigma Sound, Philadelphia, Pennsylvania
- Genres: R&B; soul; pop
- Length: 33:05 (Original); 41:46 (2002 Reissue)
- Label: Columbia
- Producers: Kenny Gamble, Leon Huff

Laura Nyro and Labelle chronology
Christmas and the Beads of Sweat (1970)	Gonna Take a Miracle (1971)	Smile (1976)

Professional ratings
Review scores
Source	Rating
AllMusic	4.5/5 stars
Christgau's Record Guide	B−
PopMatters	(favorable)
Rolling Stone	(favorable)
The Village Voice	B−

Gonna Take a Miracle is the fifth album by New York City-born singer, songwriter and pianist Laura Nyro, with assistance by vocal trio Labelle. It was released on Columbia Records in November 1971, one year after its predecessor Christmas and the Beads of Sweat. The album is Nyro's only all-covers album, and she interprets mainly 1950s and 1960s soul and R&B standards, using Labelle as a traditional back-up vocal group.

Nyro had originally had the idea to do a covers album during 1970, and on her tour to support the Christmas and the Beads of Sweat album, she introduced several of the songs that later appeared on Gonna Take a Miracle, including "Spanish Harlem" and "Dancing in the Street".

Gonna Take a Miracle remains a critics' favorite Laura Nyro record for its laidback atmosphere and impressive soul grooves and musicianship as well as classic Philadelphia soul production from Kenny Gamble and Leon Huff. It was her last commercially successful album, peaking at No. 46 on the Billboard 200, then known as the Pop Albums chart, as well as No. 41 on the Black Albums chart.

The album was Nyro's last for over four years as she turned her back on the music industry to get married and live a rural life away from the spotlight. Her work with Patti LaBelle on the album formed a lifelong friendship.

In 2005, music magazine The Word voted Gonna Take a Miracle among the 60 Best Underrated Albums of All Time.

== Background ==
Nyro first met Patti LaBelle in 1970 when she was about to give an interview to LaBelle's manager Vicki Wickham. Wickham brought LaBelle along to the interview, where she engaged in deep conversation with Nyro. They went on the road together, with LaBelle cooking for Nyro.

== Production ==
The album was recorded in May and June 1971 at Sigma Sound Studios. The producers were Kenny Gamble and Leon Huff. Patti LaBelle and her vocal partners in Labelle, Nona Hendryx and Sarah Dash, were brought in as backing singers.

Nyro was the main selector of material for the album, and chose songs she was influenced by growing up in the Bronx of the 1950s and 1960s. The songs include The Shirelles' "I Met Him on a Sunday", The Originals' "The Bells" (written by Marvin Gaye), Smokey Robinson & the Miracles' "You've Really Got a Hold on Me", Ben E. King's "Spanish Harlem", The Charts' "Deserie/Desiree", Major Lance's "The Monkey Time" (written by Curtis Mayfield), and The Royalettes' "It's Gonna Take a Miracle".

The album balances the grittier numbers with the more ethereal soul ballad "The Wind" and the sultry love ballad "Désiree". Nyro, Labelle and Gamble and Huff mixed genres including doo-wop, soul, R&B, pop and gospel. "Despite Gamble and Huff's presence on the project, Nyro remained fully in charge," wrote biographer Michele Kort.

== Track listing ==
1. "I Met Him on a Sunday" (Doris Jackson, Addie Harris McPherson, Beverly Lee, Shirley Alston Reeves) – 1:55
2. "The Bells" (Marvin Gaye, Anna Gordy Gaye, Iris Gordy, Elgie Stover) – 2:56
3. "Monkey Time/Dancing in the Street" (Curtis Mayfield, Marvin Gaye, Ivy Jo Hunter, William "Mickey" Stevenson) – 4:57
4. "Désiree" (L.Z. Cooper, Danny Johnson) – 1:52
5. "You've Really Got a Hold on Me" (Smokey Robinson) – 4:07
6. "Spanish Harlem" (Jerry Leiber, Phil Spector) – 2:52
7. "Jimmy Mack" (Holland–Dozier–Holland) – 2:56
8. "The Wind" (Devora Brown, Bob Edwards, Nolan Strong) – 2:58
9. "Nowhere to Run" (Holland–Dozier–Holland) – 5:08
10. "It's Gonna Take a Miracle" (Teddy Randazzo, Bobby Weinstein, Lou Stallman) – 3:24

Live bonus tracks on 2002 CD reissue

11. "Ain't Nothing Like the Real Thing" (Nickolas Ashford, Valerie Simpson) – 0:59
12. "(You Make Me Feel Like) A Natural Woman" (Gerry Goffin, Carole King, Jerry Wexler) – 3:01
13. "O-o-h Child" (Stan Vincent) – 1:30
14. "Up on the Roof" (Gerry Goffin, Carole King) – 3:11

== Personnel ==
- Laura Nyro – vocals, piano
- Nona Hendryx, Patti LaBelle, Sarah Dash – vocals
- Norman Harris, Roland Chambers – guitar
- Ronnie Baker – bass
- Lenny Pakula – organ
- Jim Helmer – drums
- Vincent Montana Jr. – percussion
- Larry Washington – bongos
- Nydia "Liberty" Mata – congas
- Bobby Martin, Lenny Pakula, Thom Bell – string and horn arrangements

Technical

- Tim Geelan – engineer
- Gary Burden – art direction, design
- Stephen Paley – front cover photography

== The 2002 remaster ==
During the summer of 2002, the Legacy imprint of Columbia Records reissued the album in remastered and expanded format. The additional tracks were all recorded live at New York's Fillmore East and were later issued on the live album Spread Your Wings and Fly: Live at the Fillmore East May 30, 1971. They are "Ain't Nothing Like the Real Thing", "(You Make Me Feel Like) A Natural Woman", "Ooh Child" and "Up on the Roof", all fitting with the covers theme of the original album.

The reissue features photographs and recording details as well as new liner notes by Amy Linden and a back-cover personal recollection by Patti LaBelle. The reissue was released alongside similar versions of Eli and the Thirteenth Confession and New York Tendaberry, and were produced and directed by the same Columbia/Legacy team.
