= Bulbs (song) =

Single by Van Morrison

from the album Veedon Fleece
- B-side: "Cul de Sac" (US); "Who Was That Masked Man" (UK)
- Released: November 1974
- Recorded: March 1974, Mercury Studios, New York City, United States
- Genre: Folk rock; soul
- Length: 4:19
- Label: Warner Bros.
- Songwriter: Van Morrison
- Producer: Van Morrison

Van Morrison singles chronology
"Ain't Nothing You Can Do" (1974)	"Bulbs" (1974)	"Caldonia" (1974)

Official audio
- "Bulbs" on YouTube

"Bulbs" is a song written by Northern Irish singer-songwriter Van Morrison. It was the only single to be taken from his 1974 album Veedon Fleece, with a B-side of "Cul de Sac" for the US release and "Who Was That Masked Man" for the UK release.

== Recording and composition ==
"Bulbs" was first recorded, with different lyrics, at the recording session for the 1973 album, Hard Nose the Highway, released in 1973. After the first recording session for Veedon Fleece', "Bulbs" was re-cut at Mercury Studios in New York City in March 1974, along with "Cul de Sac", to give it a more rock feeling. According to Jef Labes this was "cause he (Morrison) didn't feel they had the right feeling... It was me, Van and a bunch of other guys that he'd never played with." Bass player Joe Macho had previously played on the 1966 Bobby Hebb hit song "Sunny".

"Bulbs" has been described as "a pleasant, catchy country ditty, a Dire Straits song before its time" by biographer John Collis. As with many of Morrison's songs, "Bulbs" does not have a clear story line, but in part focuses on immigration to the United States as in the lines:

She's leaving Pan American
Suitcase in her hand
I said her brothers and her sisters
Are all on Atlantic sand

== Critical reception ==
Record World called it "Something like a performance from his Astral Weeks days with a graft of pedal steel" and said that "Van benefits from a renewed power surge."

In an interview with Morrison, Tom Donahue said, after he had listened to "Bulbs": "You always make great noises. The other things you do in songs beside the words."

In a Stylus Magazine review for the album Veedon Fleece, Derek Miller says of the song:

"Of course, the best and most immediately memorable song on Veedon Fleece is "Bulbs". Coming about as close to laying down a groove as he does on the album, the song quickly makes dust of its acoustic start, leaping headstrong into a Waylon Jennings' style bass-roll, rump heavy and plush, pianos shimmering and fingerdense."

Morrison performed the song on the German television show Musikladen on 13 November 1974.

== Title ==
"Bulbs" – Intro
26 seconds of "Bulbs"

The title might come from the lines:

And her batteries are corroded
And her hundred watt bulb just blew
or the repeated chorus:
.. she's standing in the shadows
Where the street lights all turn blue

== Personnel ==
- Van Morrison – vocals, acoustic guitar
- John Tropea – electric guitar
- Jef Labes – piano
- Joe Macho – bass
- Allan Schwartzberg – drums

== Other releases ==
A live performance of this song is featured on the 1974 disc of Morrison's 2006 issued DVD, Live at Montreux 1980/1974. Morrison used a stripped-down band on this Montreaux Jazz Festival appearance consisting of:

- Van Morrison – vocals, guitar
- Pete Wingfield – piano, background vocals
- Jerome Rimson – bass, background vocals
- Dallas Taylor – drums

== Covers ==
- Australian blues and root band The Revelators covered the song on their 2000 album, The Adventures of The Amazing Revelators.
- Ellis Hooks performed a cover version of "Bulbs" on the 2003 released tribute album, Vanthology: A Tribute to Van Morrison.
- "Bulbs" was covered by Jason Boland & the Stragglers on their 2018 album "Hard Times Are Relative."
