= Veedon Fleece =

Studio album by Van Morrison
- Released: October 1974
- Recorded: November 1973 and spring 1974
- Studios: Caledonia Studios, California and Mercury Studios, New York
- Genre: Folk jazz
- Length: 47:36
- Label: Warner Bros.
- Producer: Van Morrison

Van Morrison chronology
It's Too Late to Stop Now (1974)	Veedon Fleece (1974)	A Period of Transition (1977)

Singles from Veedon Fleece
- 1. "Bulbs" b/w "Cul de Sac" Released: November 1974

Veedon Fleece is the eighth studio album by Northern Irish singer-songwriter Van Morrison, released in October 1974. Morrison recorded the album in two weeks while living back in Ireland after 7 years in the USA. With his broken marriage in the past, Morrison visited Ireland on holiday for new inspiration, arriving on 20 October 1973 (with his fiancée at the time, Carol Guida). While there he wrote, in less than three weeks, the songs included on the album (except "Bulbs", "Country Fair" and "Come Here My Love").

It's acutely comparable to Astral Weeks (1968) with the same "stream of consciousness" lyrics but musically it is more Celtic, acoustic and heavily influenced by Morrison's Irish trip. It is a mythic album in every sense and an extraordinary album that gains ever more praise year after year and has been referred to as Morrison's "forgotten masterpiece".

== Background ==
During the summer months of 1973, Morrison had embarked on a three-month tour with his eleven-piece band, the Caledonia Soul Orchestra. Although the resulting concerts and live album, It's Too Late to Stop Now, have come to be known as a performing high for Morrison, the tour was physically and emotionally exhausting. Morrison decided afterwards to take a vacation break, returning to Ireland after a six-year absence ostensibly to record an RTÉ national TV show. Having gone through divorce proceedings earlier in the year, Morrison was now accompanied by his new fiancée, Carol Guida. The vacation visit lasted nearly three weeks during which time he only toured the southern part of the island and did not venture into his native Northern Ireland as the province was engulfed in the Troubles.

== Recording ==
In 1978, Morrison recalled that he recorded the songs about four weeks after writing them: "Veedon Fleece was a bunch of songs that I wrote and then I just recorded it about four weeks after I wrote it. When you make an album you write some songs; you might have four songs and maybe you write two more, suddenly you've got enough songs for an album." According to the drummer Dahaud Shaar, the tracks were laid down in a very informal manner: "During that time I kinda haunted the studio, and Van would come in and we'd just do tracks." David Hayes recalled about the recording sessions: "Every night for about a week he came in with two or three new tunes and we just started playing with him." Jim Rothermel also recalled that during the California recording sessions for the album the songs were often a first take and that the band members had sometimes not heard the songs previously. The strings and woodwinds were arranged by Jef Labes in a New York studio. The song "Come Here My Love" was inspired during the week of the sessions and another song "Country Fair" was left over from the Hard Nose the Highway album and provided a fitting sense of closure. "Bulbs" and "Cul de Sac" were recut in New York later with musicians with whom Morrison had never worked before: guitarist John Tropea, bassist Joe Macho and drummer Allan Schwartzberg. Given a rock music treatment, these songs were released as the single for the album."

== Composition ==
"Veedon Fleece initiates a period of growing poetical confidence, with a muse that, while still often stream-of-consciousness, is more under the control of the lyricist."

— Erik Hage, (2009).

The songs, as recorded on the album, were influenced by his vacation trip to Ireland in 1973; it was his first visit since he left Belfast in 1967. (At this time his parents had moved to California and resided near him.) According to biographer Erik Hage: "Veedon Fleece from a lyrical standpoint, shows maturity, renewed poetical confidence, and a direct nod to actual literary influences." Hage further comments that musically it "can be seen as a companion album to Astral Weeks. The soft and complex musical textures (often augmented by flute) of this album are the closest he will ever again get to that vaunted 1968 album."

The opening track, "Fair Play" derived its name from Morrison's Irish friend, Donall Corvin's repeated use of the Irish colloquialism "fair play to you" as a wry compliment. It's a 3/4 ballad that name checks Oscar Wilde, Edgar Allan Poe and Henry David Thoreau. According to Morrison, the song derived "from what was running through my head" and it marked a return to the stream of consciousness channeled song-writing that had not been evident since several of the songs contained in his 1972 album, Saint Dominic's Preview.

"Linden Arden Stole the Highlights" segues into "Who Was That Masked Man" (sung in falsetto) which has a similar melody. The story line pertains to a mythological Irish expatriate living in San Francisco who, when cornered, turns violent and then goes into hiding, "living with a gun", and references a childhood interest in The Lone Ranger. Morrison described the anti-hero Linden Arden as being "about an image of an Irish American living in San Francisco – it's really a hard man type of thing, whilst the latter was a song about what it's like when you absolutely cannot trust anybody. Not as in some paranoia, but in reality."

"Streets of Arklow" describes a perfect day in "God's green land" and is a tribute to the Wicklow town visited during this vacation trip. The opening lines of the song: "And as we walked through the streets of Arklow, oh the colours of the day warm, and our heads were filled with poetry, in the morning coming onto dawn" were said to "contain the thematic seeds of the whole album: nature, poetry, god, innocence re-found and love lost" by PopMatters critic John Kennedy.

"You Don't Pull No Punches, but You Don't Push the River" is frequently regarded as one of Morrison's most accomplished compositions. He revealed that the song owed a considerable debt to his readings in Gestalt therapy. Johnny Rogan felt that this track was representative of "an experimental peak, a step beyond even his most ambitious work."

On the second side of the album, the songs "Bulbs" and "Cul de Sac" focus on emigration to America and homecoming.

The album concludes with the love songs, "Comfort You", "Come Here My Love", and "Country Fair"—the latter two employing the traditional Irish ballad style. To Clinton Heylin, the songs also spoke to "the healing power of love... here at last are songs that speak of what he can do for her, rather than concerned solely with his needs and wants." Heylin comments on the song, "Come Here My Love": "This is no 'Autumn Song'. Rather, it sounds a lot like a man learning how to love again." Morrison spoke of "Country Fair" as having the same kind of feeling as "And It Stoned Me", although that song was used to open the Moondance album, instead of as a kind of closure.

Years before "Twilight Zone" was released as a bonus track on the 2008 re-mastered version of Veedon Fleece, Brian Hinton had said about the version of the song on The Philosopher's Stone: "'Twilight Zone' is a very slow, bluesy, late-night song that would fit right in on Veedon Fleece."

== Critical reception ==
Professional ratings
Retrospective reviews
Review scores
Source	Rating
AllMusic	4.5/5 stars
Christgau's Record Guide	B+
Q	3/5 stars
Record Collector	4/5 stars
Rolling Stone	4/5 stars
The Rolling Stone Album Guide	5/5 stars
Uncut	2/5 stars

When Veedon Fleece was released, it sold poorly and was received unfavourably by critics from Rolling Stone and Melody Maker. The latter wrote that the first side of the album features "some of his least memorable shots at songwriting since Tupelo Honey". Jim Miller from Rolling Stone found the entire album "self-indulgent" and called it "mood music for mature hippies."

In a retrospective review for The Rolling Stone Album Guide (2004), Rob Sheffield hailed Veedon Fleece as "the culmination of everything Van was doing up to that point, all Celtic mystic tumult in the vocals and pastoral beauty in the music" and ranked it among "his most majestic music". Allmusic critics Jason Ankeny and Thom Jurek called the album "brilliant" and commented that "With its elegiac tone and deeply autobiographical lyrics, this was a Morrison who didn't so readily associate himself with the feel-good, peace, love, and rhythm & blues sound American audiences were used to." John Kennedy from PopMatters felt it is beautiful in the sense defined by French poet Charles Baudelaire, "a poet's album, a jazz lover's album, a masterpiece of soul-singing, a blue and green journey into the places of the heart that were first opened up for dowsing with Astral Weeks." Derek Miller of Stylus Magazine believed it is astonishing, "so frothy and thick, that requires silence when it's over ... To me that's the better explanation for Morrison's three-year absence. He'd just finished Veedon Fleece." Robert Christgau was less enthusiastic in Christgau's Record Guide: Rock Albums of the Seventies (1981), and said it is Morrison's most shamelessly cathartic work since Astral Weeks, "soothing, evocative late-night music", but suffers from his long-windedness and a second side highlighted only by "Bulbs".

== Aftermath ==
This album was followed by a three-year hiatus for Morrison from recording, and except for an appearance with the Band in 1976 on The Last Waltz concert at Winterland, from performing live. Clinton Heylin noted that Veedon Fleece is by far the most underplayed album in Morrison's canon. By 2010, only seven of the ten songs from the album have ever been played by Morrison in concert. Of those seven, only "You Don't Pull No Punches, But You Don't Push the River" and "Streets of Arklow" have been played more than twenty times live. "Fair Play" was performed for the first time live in June 2009. After Veedon Fleece, most of Morrison's albums would chart higher in the UK than in the United States, partly due to his move back to Europe several years afterward.

The 30 June 2008 reissued and remastered version of the album contains an alternative take of "Cul de Sac" and "Twilight Zone". "Who Was That Masked Man" from this album was listed as one of the standout tracks from the six album reissue.

== Influence ==
Biographer Brian Hinton has said that when he agreed to write Celtic Crossroads, it was with the hope that he might "turn a few people on to this album, above all others in Morrison's rich oeuvre."

Sinéad O'Connor reviewed the album on 28 November 2007 on The Dave Fanning Show and praised it as: "the record I always come back to again and again...It is far superior to Astral Weeks and I love Astral Weeks. This is the definitive Van album with the definitive Van song, "Who Was That Masked Man"...It's the most obvious album he's ever done about Ireland...Veedon Fleece is the only thing I listen to just before I go on stage." When asked in an interview in 2005 to name something she considered "a mind-altering work of art", she answered: "Van Morrison's Veedon Fleece."

Singer-songwriter Elvis Costello has referred to this album as one of his favourites and names "Linden Arden Stole the Highlights" as the song that makes this album "special to (him)."

Josh Klinghoffer (Red Hot Chili Peppers and Dot Hacker) hailed the record in Q magazine in November 2011. When asked which record he could not be without, he answered: "At this point I’ve determined that Veedon Fleece by Van Morrison is my favourite record of all time. I love it from start to finish; it’s perfect".

== Album cover ==
The album cover photograph shows Morrison sitting in the grass between two Irish Wolfhounds. The photographer, Tom Collins, took the original photograph that situated Morrison and the dogs adjacent to the Sutton Castle Hotel, a converted mansion overlooking Dublin Bay, where Morrison first stayed upon arriving in Ireland for his vacation.

== Album title ==
Several authors have commented on the mysterious object, "Veedon Fleece" as it appears in the album title and in the lyrics of the song "You Don't Pull No Punches, but You Don't Push the River". Scott Thomas states in his review: "The Morrison-conceived Veedon Fleece is the symbol of everything yearned for in the preceding songs; spiritual enlightenment, wisdom, community, artistic vision and love." Steve Turner concludes: "The Veedon Fleece...appears to be Van's Irish equivalent of the Holy Grail a religious relic that would answer his questions if he could track it down on his quest around the west coast of Ireland." Morrison explained the title with: "I haven't a clue about what the title means. It's actually a person's name. I have a whole set of characters in my head that I'm trying to fit into things. Veedon Fleece is one of them and I just suddenly started singing it in one of these songs, It's like a stream of consciousness thing." Morrison once told a fan when questioned about the meaning, "It doesn't mean anything, I made it up myself."

== Covers ==
The songs "Fair Play" and "Linden Arden Stole the Highlights" were covered by Robyn Hitchcock. Scout Niblett recorded a version of "Comfort You" with Will Oldham on her album This Fool Can Die Now. A version of "Come Here My Love" was recorded by dream pop collective This Mortal Coil on their 1986 album Filigree & Shadow.

== Track listing ==
All songs written by Van Morrison

Side one
No.	Title	Length
1.	"Fair Play"	6:12
2.	"Linden Arden Stole The Highlights"	2:36
3.	"Who Was That Masked Man"	2:42
4.	"Streets of Arklow"	4:32
5.	"You Don't Pull No Punches, but You Don't Push the River"	8:48

Side two
No.	Title	Length
6.	"Bulbs"	4:15
7.	"Cul de Sac"	5:42
8.	"Comfort You"	4:21
9.	"Come Here My Love"	2:18
10.	"Country Fair"	5:35

2008 CD Bonus tracks
No.	Title	Length
11.	"Twilight Zone" (Alternative Take)	5:51
12.	"Cul de Sac" (Alternative Take)	2:56

== Personnel ==
=== Musicians ===
- Van Morrison – vocal, guitar
- James Trumbo – piano
- Jef Labes – piano on "Bulbs" and "Cul de Sac"
- Ralph Walsh – guitar
- John Tropea – guitar on "Bulbs" and "Cul de Sac"
- David Hayes – bass
- Joe Macho – bass on "Bulbs" and "Cul de Sac"
- Dahaud Shaar (David Shaw) – drums
- Allan Schwartzberg – drums on "Bulbs" and "Cul de Sac"
- Nathan Rubin – violin
- Terry Adams – cello
- James Rothermel – flute, recorder
- Jack Schroer – soprano saxophone

=== Production ===
- Producer: Van Morrison
- Engineers: Jim Stern, Dahaud Shaar (David Shaw), Jean Shaar, Elvin Campbell
- Photography: Tom Collins
- Art Direction: Ed Caraeff
- Arrangements: Van Morrison, Jef Labes (string and woodwind)
- Remastering: Ian Cooper, Walter Samuel

== Charts ==
Chart (1974/75)	Position
Australia (Kent Music Report)	59
US Pop Albums	53
UK Album Chart	41
