= Fair Play (song) =

1974 song by Van Morrison

Song by Van Morrison

from the album Veedon Fleece
- Released: October 1974
- Recorded: November 1973
- Genre: Folk rock; folk jazz; free jazz
- Length: 6:14
- Label: Warner Bros.
- Songwriter(s): Van Morrison
- Producer(s): Van Morrison

"Fair Play" is a song by Northern Irish artist Van Morrison. The opening track on the 1974 album Veedon Fleece, it derived its name from Morrison's Irish friend, Donall Corvin's repeated use of the Irish colloquialism "fair play to you" as a wry compliment. The 3/4 ballad references Irish city Killarney, and poets Oscar Wilde, Edgar Allan Poe and Henry David Thoreau, and according to Morrison, the song derived from "what was running through his head", and marked a return to the stream of consciousness channeled song-writing that had not been evident since several of the songs contained in his 1972 album Saint Dominic's Preview. "Fair Play" was included on the 2015 compilation The Essential Van Morrison.

== Reviews ==
Allmusic describes the song as "a jazzy folk song which opens the album with soft strains of an acoustic guitar, upright bass, and natural-sounding piano that slowly start to come to life". The aforementioned sounds were described as "the kinds of sounds that bring to mind an autumn Sunday morning, when things seem rested, meditative, solid, and complete". As Veedon Fleece is often overlooked in favor of critically lauded Van Morrison's first major artistic breakthrough Astral Weeks, the album still picks up where the former record left off and more fully realizes the spiritual and musical quests set forth on Astral Weeks. The song is also described as deep, and "a soul number in the literal sense of the term".

== Live performance ==
"Fair Play" was performed 56 times totally (three times in medleys).
