= Smile (Laura Nyro album) =

Studio album by Laura Nyro
- Released: February 1976
- Recorded: 1975
- Studio: CBS 30th Street Studio, New York City
- Genre: Soul; jazz; pop
- Length: 31:57
- Label: Columbia (UK, US)
- Producer: Laura Nyro, Charlie Calello

Laura Nyro chronology
| Gonna Take a Miracle (1971) | Smile (1976) | Season of Lights (1977) |

Smile is the sixth album by New York singer, songwriter and pianist Laura Nyro. It was released in early 1976, following a four-year hiatus from the music industry during which time she both married and divorced, and lived away from the spotlight. She dedicated the album to her mother.

The music of Smile is smooth jazz-pop, and Nyro was reunited with producer and arranger Charlie Calello, who had worked with Nyro on her 1968 opus Eli and the Thirteenth Confession.

Musically, Smile finds Nyro exploring Chinese culture with traditional Asian instrumentation and lyric allusions, particularly on the mildly controversial "Children of the Junks". Elsewhere, she rails against the music industry ("Money") and sings of her new laidback lifestyle away from the glare of the media.

Despite her long absence, Columbia Records had re-signed Nyro and the album became a small chart success during 1976, peaking at No. 60 on the Billboard 200, then known as the Pop Albums chart. It produced her first full-band tour in 1976, which was documented the following year on the live album Season of Lights.

== Overview ==
After Nyro's huge burst of creativity between 1966 and 1971, when she recorded five well-received albums and well over 40 original songs, she retreated from the limelight, partly stung by her lack of major commercial success in her own right but also because of the lure of love.

Nyro married Vietnam War veteran David Bianchini in 1972 after a whirlwind romance and spent the next three years living with him in a small town in Massachusetts. The marriage ended after three years, during which time she grew accustomed to the country life as opposed to the city life where she had recorded her first five records.

In 1975, Nyro split from Bianchini and also suffered the trauma of the death of her mother Gilda to ovarian cancer at the age of 49; Laura herself died from the same disease at the same age two decades later. She consoled herself largely by recording a new album, enlisting Charlie Calello, with whom she had collaborated on Eli and the Thirteenth Confession.

Musically, Smile begins the "mellow period" that Nyro stayed with on her studio albums for the rest of her career, although it continues her fascination with mysticism with various exotic instruments and arrangements. The title track, particularly, explores a deep flirtation with Japanese music. Several of the tracks, including "Children of the Junks" and "I Am The Blues" had been written and sung by Nyro in concert as early as 1971 and 1972 (as evidenced by bootleg recordings) and were later recorded for this album.

Professional ratings
Review scores
| Source | Rating |
|---|---|
| Allmusic | link |
| Christgau's Record Guide | B− |
| Rolling Stone | (mixed) link |

== Track listing ==
All tracks composed by Laura Nyro, except where indicated.

1. "Sexy Mama" (Al Goodman, Sylvia Robinson, Harry Ray) – 2:41
2. "Children of the Junks" – 2:49
3. "Money" – 4:59
4. "I Am the Blues" – 5:44
5. "Stormy Love" – 4:29
6. "The Cat Song" – 2:34
7. "Midnite Blue" – 3:05
8. "Smile" – 5:36

=== Japanese remastered version with bonus tracks ===
1. "Sexy Mama"
2. "Children of the Junks"
3. "Money"
4. "I Am the Blues"
5. "Stormy Love"
6. "Cat Song"
7. "Midnite Blue"
8. "Smile"
9. "Someone Loves You" (Demo) (Bonus track)
10. "Get Me My Cap" (Demo) (Bonus track)
11. "Coffee Morning" (Demo) (Bonus track)

== Personnel ==
- Laura Nyro – vocals, piano, guitar, wood block
- Joe Beck, Greg Bennett, Jerry Friedman, Hugh McCracken, Jeff Mironov, John Tropea – guitar
- Bob Babbitt, Richard Davis, Will Lee – bass guitar
- Rick Marotta, Chris Parker, Allan Schwartzberg – drums
- Jimmy Maelen – tambourine, wood block
- Carter C.C. Collins, Nydia Mata – congas
- Rubens Bassini – shaker
- David Friedman – vibraphone
- Michael Brecker, Joe Farrell, George Young – saxophone
- Randy Brecker – trumpet
- Paul Messing – triangle
- Reiko Kamota, Nisako Yoshida – koto

Technical

- Don Puluse, Tim Geelan – engineer
- Jay Messina, Lou Waxman, Stan Tonkel – assistant engineer
- Ed Lee – artwork
- Patty Newport – photography
