= The Bottom Line (venue) =

Music venue in Manhattan, New York

Coordinates: 40°43′44″N 73°59′43″W

- Interactive map of The Bottom Line
- Address: 15 West 4th Street; Manhattan, New York City
- Location: Greenwich Village
- Capacity: 400

Construction
- Opened: February 12, 1974
- Closed: 2004

The Bottom Line was a music venue at 15 West 4th Street between Mercer Street and Greene Street in the Greenwich Village neighborhood of Manhattan, New York City. During the 1970s and 1980s the club was a major space for small-scale popular music performances. It opened on February 11, 1974.

== History ==
For three decades the two club owners, Allan Pepper and Stanley Snadowsky, presented major musical acts and premiered new talent. Bruce Springsteen played showcase gigs at the club and Lou Reed recorded the album Live: Take No Prisoners there. Harry Chapin held his 2000th concert at the Bottom Line in January 1981.

The Bottom Line hosted an extremely wide variety of music and musicians. Among the thousands who performed on its stage were Eric Clapton, João Gilberto, Carl Perkins, Linda Ronstadt, The Manhattan Transfer, Patti Smith, Ringo Starr (documented on VH1 Storytellers (Ringo Starr album)), The Police, Stuff, Rockapella, Adrian Belew, Prince, Pat Benatar, Daryl Hall & John Oates, Miles Davis, Laura Nyro (documented on Laura: Live at the Bottom Line and Live: The Loom's Desire), Cheap Trick, Rory Gallagher, Chuck Mangione, Carl Hancock Rux, Emmylou Harris, Neil Young, Leo Kottke, Southside Johnny and the Asbury Jukes, Doc Watson, Barry Manilow, Dire Straits, Son Volt, Grayson Hugh, Tammy Wynette, Dolly Parton, Shawn Colvin, George Jones, The Pointer Sisters, Ravi Shankar, k.d. lang, Ramones, NRBQ, The Brecker Brothers, Allan Holdsworth, Gato Barbieri, Bryan Ferry, Billy Joel, Yellow Magic Orchestra, David Bromberg, The Blue Nile, Fairport Convention, Steeleye Span, Gil Scott-Heron together with Brian Jackson (documented on Live in New York), The Metros (sponsored by WNEW -FM Prisoners of Rock with Meg Griffin, and Van Morrison.

The live parts of Derek and Clive (Live), a spoken-word and music comedy album recorded by Peter Cook and Dudley Moore in late 1973 under their guises of Derek and Clive, were recorded at The Bottom Line.

The club seated 400 people and had a no-smoking policy long before that restriction became New York City law.

In later years the club hosted In Their Own Words: A Bunch Of Songwriters Sittin' Around Singing, a series of performances with commentary organized and initially hosted by radio personality Vin Scelsa. Another staple was the annual Downtown Messiah, a reworking of Handel directed by Richard Barone. At Christmastime, musicians like Vernon Reid and David Johansen made The Messiah their own. The venue also held annual New Year's Eve shows by The Turtles (often performing as Flo & Eddie). Another recurring event was The Beat Goes On, a show in which performers covered pop songs around a theme, such as Christmas songs, or songs from a given time period. That show presented performers including Fountains of Wayne, Richard Lloyd and Hedwig and the Angry Inch's John Cameron Mitchell. The Bottom Line was also the site, in April 1995, of four concerts by Joan Baez, in which she collaborated with a number of female performers, including Dar Williams, Janis Ian, Mary Chapin Carpenter, the Indigo Girls and Mary Black, the results of which were recorded and released as the album Ring Them Bells.

In 2003, due to rent increases from its landlord New York University, the club owed $190,000 in back rent, plus several hundred thousand dollars in other expenses, and was threatened with eviction. Fans started a petition on a "Save the Bottom" website in support of the club. Bruce Springsteen offered to pay the club's back rent if NYU and the owners could settle on a lease. Sirius Satellite Radio offered the same, but rather than risk a takeover, Pepper and Snadowsky closed the club before they could be kicked out. The last Bottom Line show was on January 22, 2004, just shy of the club's 30th anniversary. The building now houses NYU classrooms.

Pepper and Snadowsky attempted to find another venue to carry the Bottom Line name. The club continued to maintain a website with its official history. From 2005 through 2013, the site was updated annually on February 12 (the anniversary of the club's opening), with a letter detailing their current progress. In February 2007 they announced plans to release a box set of archival recordings on Koch Records. In 2011 they announced the box set was in "limbo" pending settling of performance rights issues, and the search was continuing for a new location. Snadowsky died in February 2013 from complications of diabetes. The website was last updated in February 2013 and was no longer up by February 2020.

In 2015 Pepper began to release a series of albums from his recordings, which included more than 1,000 shows, on The Bottom Line Record Company along with starting a new website – The Bottom Line Archive. In March 2015, Pepper released Kenny Rankin Plays The Beatles & More (1990); The Brecker Brothers (1976); and Willie Nile (1980 & 2000). In June 2015, The Bottom Line Archive released more titles: Harry Chapin (1981), Janis Ian (1980) Jack Bruce, Ralph Stanley, Doc Watson, Tony Orlando and a combined performance by Pete Seeger and Roger McGuinn (1994), plus reissues of In Their Own Words, Vols. 1 & 2 (1990–93) with Ric Ocasek, Joey Ramone, Richard Thompson, Suzanne Vega, John Cale, Patty Smyth, and David Johansen. In 2017 Bottom Line Records released a show recording featuring Lou Reed and Kris Kristofferson being interviewed in front of a live audience and performing. As of 2022 there have been no further releases or content updates since 2017.

== See also ==
- My Father's Place
