= Time and Love: The Essential Masters =

Compilation album by Laura Nyro
- Released: October 10, 2000
- Recorded: November 1966 – October 16, 1975
- Genre: Pop
- Label: Columbia (UK, US)
- Producer: Laura Nyro

Laura Nyro chronology
Stoned Soul Picnic: The Best of Laura Nyro (1997)	Time and Love: The Essential Masters (2000)	Live at Mountain Stage (2000)

Professional ratings
Review scores
Source	Rating
Allmusic	link

Time and Love: The Essential Masters is the third retrospective album of New York City singer-songwriter Laura Nyro's work to be released, and the first since her death in April 1997. Released on the Legacy imprint of Columbia Records, it compiles 16 of her more famous compositions into a single-disc volume, focusing on her work from 1966 to 1971, with only one song, 1975's "Sexy Mama", selected from her post-1971 catalog.

== Track listing ==
All songs written by Laura Nyro, except where noted.

1. "Sweet Blindness"
2. "Wedding Bell Blues"
3. "And When I Die"
4. "Blowin' Away"
5. "Eli's Comin'"
6. "Goodbye Joe"
7. "Stoney End"
8. "It's Gonna Take a Miracle" (Teddy Randazzo, Lou Stallman, Bob Weinstein)
9. "Stoned Soul Picnic"
10. "Lu"
11. "Save the Country"
12. "When I Was a Freeport and You Were the Main Drag"
13. "Blackpatch"
14. "Time and Love"
15. "Sexy Mama" (Al Goodman, Harry Ray, Sylvia Robinson)
16. "Up on the Roof" (Gerry Goffin, Carole King)
