= Live from Mountain Stage (Laura Nyro album) =

Live album by Laura Nyro
- Released: October 17, 2000
- Recorded: November 11, 1990
- Genre: Pop
- Label: Blue Plate
- Producer: Al Bunetta, Dan Einstein

Laura Nyro chronology
Time and Love: The Essential Masters (2000)	Live from Mountain Stage (2000)	Angel in the Dark (2001)

Professional ratings
Review scores
Source	Rating
Allmusic	link

Live from Mountain Stage was the first posthumous album release by Bronx-born musician Laura Nyro and her third officially released live album.

The short ten-song live album was recorded as part of the Mountain Stage radio series in late 1990 and features a fairly generic set list that Nyro stuck to for much of her later career. The songs are a mix of songs from her later career as well as some of her more familiar songs and soul medleys.

The album was released on the independent label Blue Plate Music to mixed reaction from fans and critics, but it paved the way for the following year's posthumous album of new material, Angel in the Dark.

== Track listing ==
1. "Oh Yeah, Maybe Baby"
2. "My Innocence"
3. "To a Child"
4. "And When I Die"
5. "Let It Be Me / The Christmas Song" [medley]
6. "Roll of the Ocean"
7. "Lite a Flame (The Animal Rights Song)"
8. "Emmie"
9. "Japanese Restaurant"
10. "I'm So Proud / Dedicated to the One I Love" [medley]
