= You Don't Pull No Punches, but You Don't Push the River =

"You Don't Pull No Punches, But You Don't Push the River"

Song by Van Morrison

from the album Veedon Fleece
- Released: October 1974
- Recorded: November 1973
- Genre: Folk rock
- Length: 8:51
- Label: Warner Bros.
- Songwriter: Van Morrison
- Producer: Van Morrison

"You Don't Pull No Punches, but You Don't Push the River" is a nine-minute song by Northern Irish singer-songwriter Van Morrison. It appears on the album Veedon Fleece, released in 1974.

== Writing and song origins ==
"You Don't Pull No Punches, but You Don't Push the River" was written on Morrison's three-week trip to Ireland in October 1973, along with seven other songs that featured on Veedon Fleece.

According to Morrison's biographer Johnny Rogan, the song begins as a love song celebrating a young girl's childhood and then goes into a journey along the west coast of Ireland and then suddenly goes into a mythological search for an object he calls the "Veedon Fleece". The Veedon Fleece, a phrase from the song, was used as the title of the album. Steve Turner believes that "The Veedon Fleece ... appears to be Van's Irish equivalent of the Holy Grail a religious relic that would answer his questions if he could track it down on his quest around the west coast of Ireland." Morrison later revealed that he came up with the Veedon Fleece as a character for the song: "I haven't a clue about what the title means. It's actually a person's name. I have a whole set of characters in my head that I'm trying to fit into things. Veedon Fleece is one of them and I just suddenly started singing it in one of these songs, It's like a stream of consciousness thing."

A book entitled, Don't Push the River (It Flows by Itself) by Barry Stevens about her use of Gestalt therapy was published in 1970. Morrison admitted—that "aside from 'flashes of Ireland'—the song had 'other flashes on other kinds of people. I was also reading a couple of books at the time ... [there's] a bit of Gestalt theory in it, too." In the song Morrison refers to William Blake and the Eternals from Blake's The Book of Urizen. This is the first time that Morrison name checks Blake in one of his songs. The Sisters of Mercy, also mentioned in the song, is a religious organisation of women founded in Dublin, Ireland.

== Composition ==
Musically, it combines a woodwind section and strings, both played in blocked chords. The song is played at a moderate tempo in the key of G major. The E minor–C major chord progression lasts throughout the duration of the piece. The song's introduction consists of Ralph Wash's acoustic guitar playing chords on the upper registers of the instrument, with James Trumbo playing the legato melody on piano in 12/8 time. Morrison then starts to scat, repeating the same melody twice. The second time is accompanied by Jim Rothermel's flute, playing the same rhythm. The transition between the real and mythological phases is transmitted in a dramatic fashion with the use of flute and strings.

== Recording ==
The song originally lasted twelve minutes, so pianist Jef Labes suggested a cut, which got it down to just under nine minutes. He later wrote the string and woodwind arrangements, as drummer Dahaud Shaar observes:

'You Don't Pull No Punches' is a pretty long track. [When] that happened, it was just acoustic guitar, bass, drums and piano, and that was the track, and it went the whole distance. It was like a nice sine wave. [Jef Labes later] built the string arrangement around that from the parts that were already played.

== Response ==
"You Don't Pull No Punches, but You Don't Push The River" is often considered to be one of Morrison's most accomplished compositions, as biographer Johnny Rogan confirms in 2006: "Morrison's most accomplished composition to date, an experimental peak which took a step beyond even his most ambitious work."

In The Uncut Ultimate Music Guide: Van Morrison Jason Anderson describes "You Don't Pull No Punches, but You Don't Push The River" as "the mesmerising nine-minute centrepiece" of Veedon Fleece.

== Personnel ==
- Van Morrison – guitar, vocal
- Teressa Adams – cello
- David Hayes – bass guitar
- James Rothermel – flute
- Nathan Rubin – violin
- Jack Schroer – soprano saxophone
- Dahaud Shaar (David Shaw) – drums
- James Trumbo – piano
- Ralph Wash – guitar
- Jef Labes – string and woodwind arrangements
