= Laura Nyro =

American singer and songwriter (1947–1997)

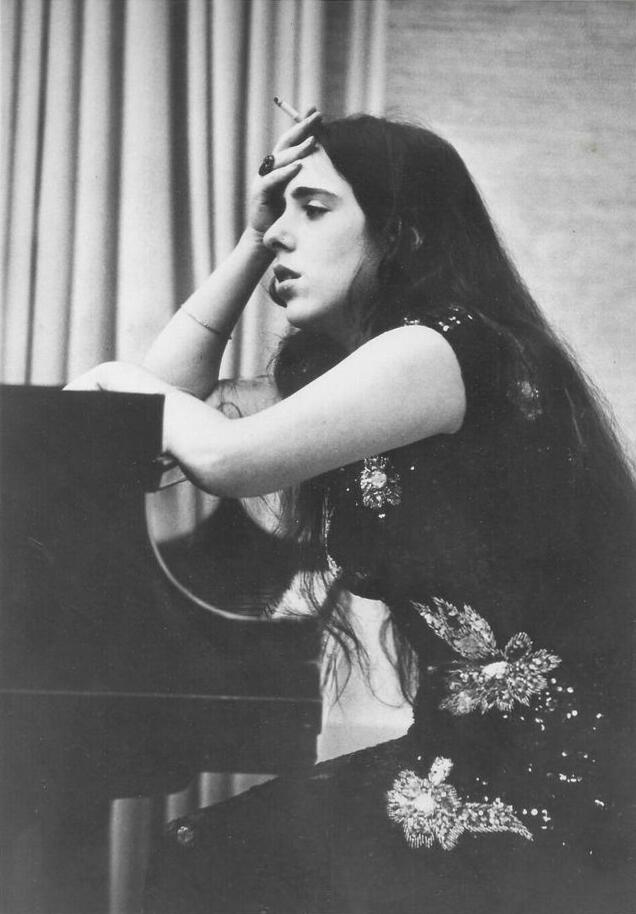
- Nyro in 1970

Background information
- Born: Laura Nigro; October 18, 1947; The Bronx, New York, U.S.
- Died: April 8, 1997 (aged 49) Danbury, Connecticut, U.S.
- Genres: Jazz; soul; soft rock; R&B; doo-wop; pop
- Occupations: Singer; songwriter
- Instruments: Vocals; piano
- Years active: 1966–1997
- Labels: Verve; Columbia
- Website: lauranyro.com at the Wayback Machine (archived November 10, 2024)

Laura Nyro (/ˈnɪəroʊ/ NEER-oh; born Laura Nigro; October 18, 1947 – April 8, 1997) was an American songwriter and singer. She achieved critical acclaim with her own recordings, particularly the albums Eli and the Thirteenth Confession (1968) and New York Tendaberry (1969), and had commercial success with artists such as Barbra Streisand and the 5th Dimension recording her songs. Wider recognition for her artistry was posthumous, while contemporaries such as Elton John and Todd Rundgren idolized her. She was praised for her emotive three-octave mezzo-soprano voice.

Between 1968 and 1970, a number of artists had hits with her songs: the 5th Dimension with "Blowing Away", "Wedding Bell Blues", "Stoned Soul Picnic", "Sweet Blindness", and "Save the Country"; Blood, Sweat & Tears and Peter, Paul and Mary with "And When I Die"; Three Dog Night and Maynard Ferguson with "Eli's Comin' "; and Barbra Streisand with "Stoney End", "Time and Love", and "Hands off the Man (Flim Flam Man)". Nyro's best-selling single was her recording of Carole King's and Gerry Goffin's "Up on the Roof".

Nyro was posthumously inducted into the Songwriters Hall of Fame in 2010, and into the Rock and Roll Hall of Fame in 2012.

== Life and career ==
=== Early life ===
Nyro was born Laura Nigro (pronounced as NIGH-gro) in the Bronx, New York City, the daughter of Louis Nigro, a piano tuner and jazz trumpeter, and Gilda (née Mirsky) Nigro, a bookkeeper. Laura had a younger brother, Jan Nigro, who has become a children's musician. Laura was of Russian Jewish and Polish Jewish descent, with Italian-American ancestry from her paternal grandfather. Her father gave her the name "Laura", after hearing the title theme of the 1944 film Laura. After Laura left high school, she chose her own surname, "Nyro", having it pronounced as NEER-oh.

"I've created my own little world, a world of music, since I was five years old", Nyro told Billboard magazine in 1970, adding that music provided, for her, a means of coping with a difficult childhood: "I was never a bright and happy child." As a child, she taught herself piano, read poetry, and listened to her mother's records by Leontyne Price, Nina Simone, Judy Garland, Billie Holiday, and classical composers such as Debussy and Ravel. She composed her first songs at age eight. With her family, she spent summers in the Catskills, where her father played trumpet at resorts. She credited the Sunday school at the New York Society for Ethical Culture with providing the basis of her education; she also attended Manhattan's High School of Music & Art.

While in high school, she sang with a group of friends in subway stations and on street corners. She said, "I would go out singing, as a teenager, to a party or out on the street, because there were harmony groups there, and that was one of the joys of my youth." She commented: "I was always interested in the social consciousness of certain songs. My mother and grandfather were progressive thinkers, so I felt at home in the peace movement and the women's movement, and that has influenced my music."

=== Early career ===
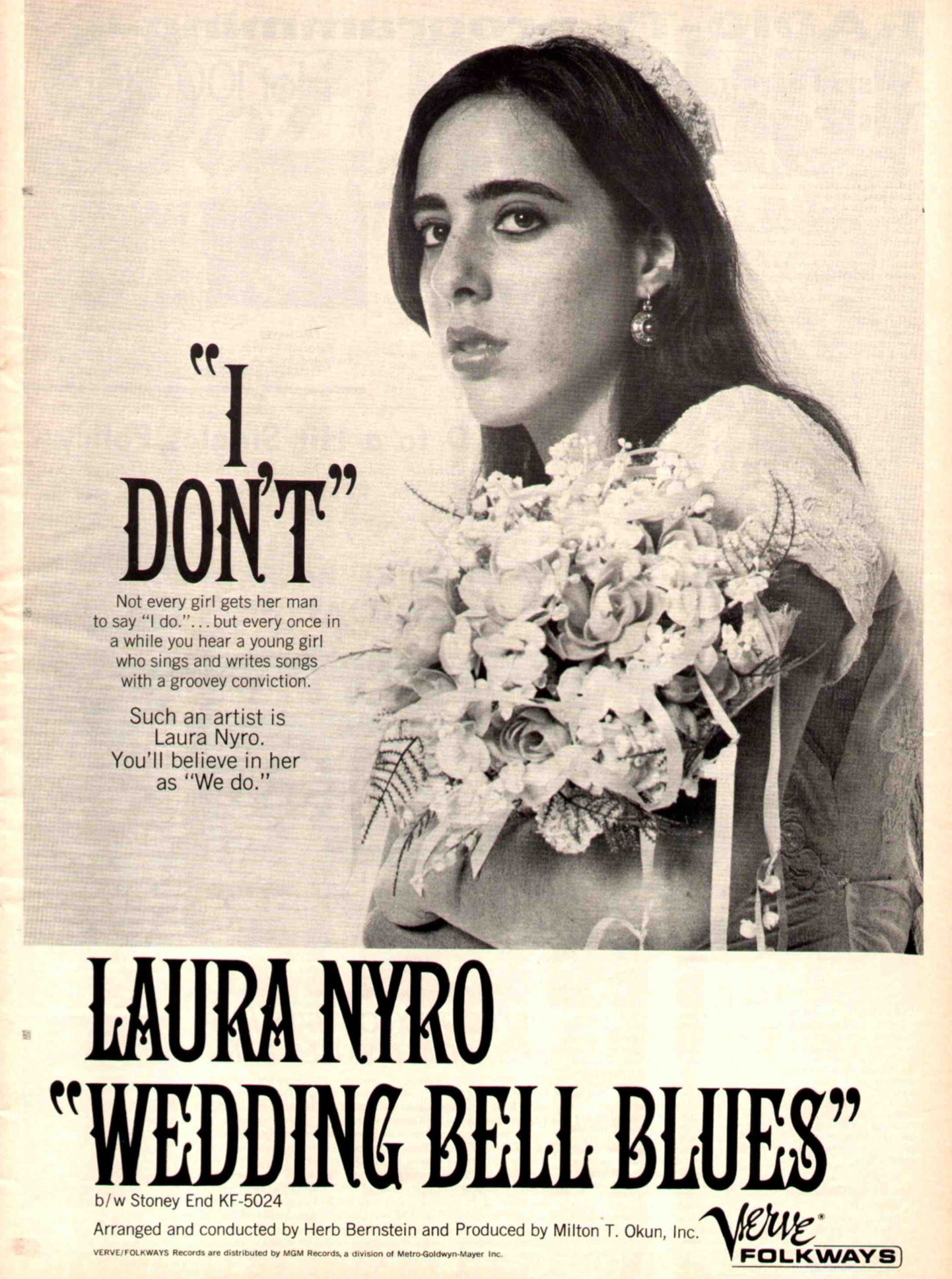
Nyro in a promotional ad for "Wedding Bell Blues" in 1966

Louis Nigro's work brought Laura into contact with record company executive Artie Mogull and his partner Paul Barry, who auditioned Laura in 1966 and became her first managers. However, Nigro later said he did "not even once" mention Laura to any of his clients.

Mogull had negotiated a recording and management contract for her, and Nyro recorded her debut album, More Than a New Discovery, for the Verve Folkways label (later re-named Verve Forecast). Other songs from the album later became hits for The 5th Dimension, Blood, Sweat & Tears, and Barbra Streisand.

On July 13, 1966, Nyro recorded "Stoney End" and "Wedding Bell Blues" as well as an early version of "Time and Love", as part of More Than A New Discovery at Bell Sounds Studios, 237 West 54th Street, Manhattan. About a month later, she sold "And When I Die" to Peter, Paul, and Mary for $5,000. On September 17, 1966, Nyro and Verve Folkways released "Wedding Bell Blues"/"Stoney End" as a single. "Wedding Bell Blues" became a minor hit, especially on the west coast. She completed More Than A New Discovery in New York on November 29, 1966; and, starting on January 16, 1967, made her first extended professional appearance at age 19, performing nightly for about a month at the "hungry i" coffeehouse in San Francisco. In February 1967, Verve Folkways released More Than A New Discovery. On March 4, 1967, Nyro appeared on Clay Cole's Diskoteck, Episode 7.23, along with Dion and the Belmonts and others, but the recording of the episode is lost. On March 21, 1967, she appeared on Where the Action Is (episode 3.140) with videos of "Wedding Bell Blues" (partially extant), "Blowin' Away" (lost) and "Goodbye Joe" (lost).

On June 17, 1967, Nyro appeared at the Monterey Pop Festival. Although some accounts described her performance as a fiasco that culminated in her being booed off the stage, recordings later made publicly available contradict this version of events. Newsweek reporter Michael Lydon reviewed her performance very negatively, writing that "the evening hit bottom" during Nyro's "melodramatic" set.

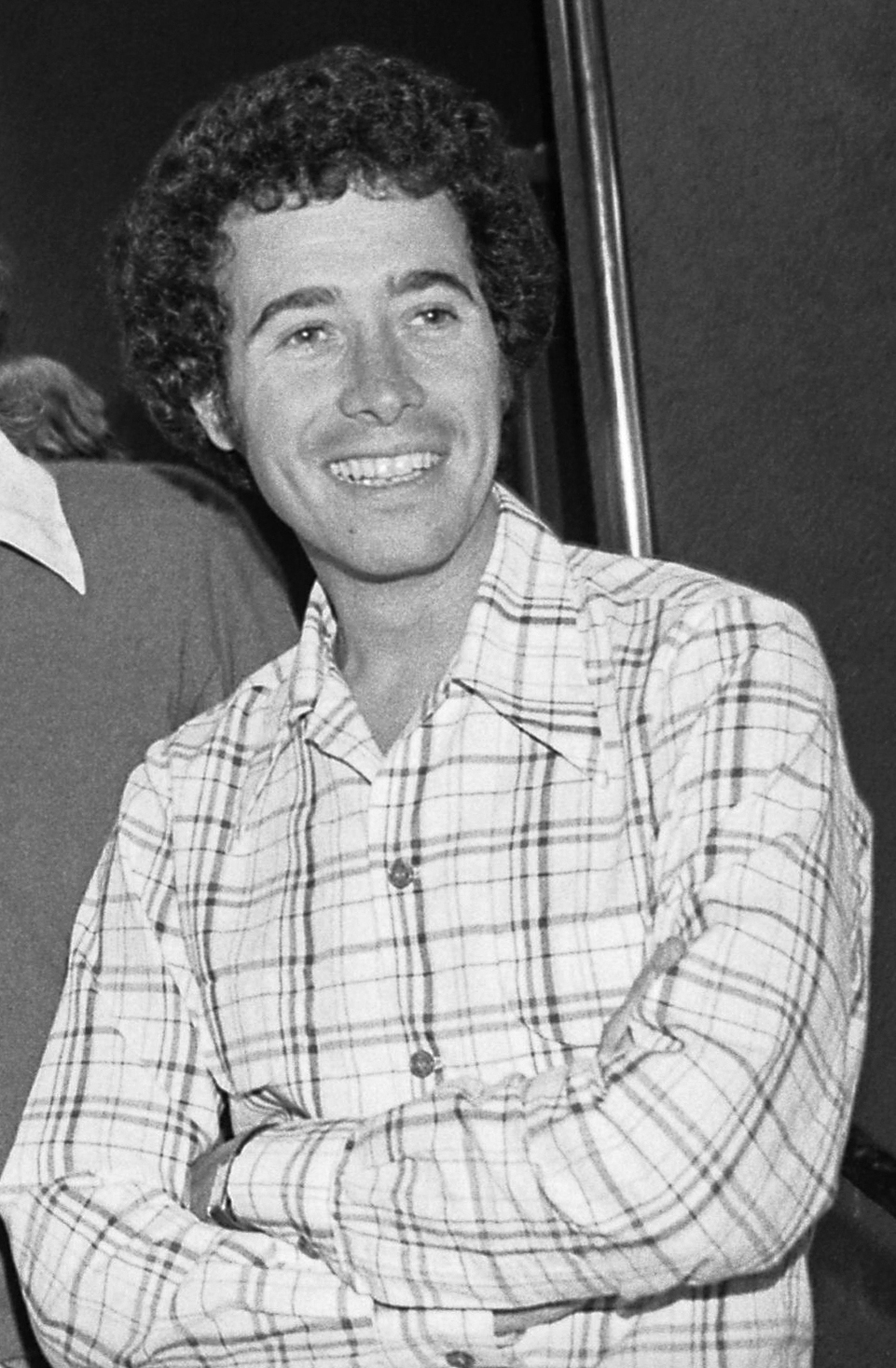
David Geffen (pictured 1973) became Nyro's manager and arranged a contract with Columbia Records.

Soon afterwards, David Geffen approached Mogull about taking over as Nyro's agent. Nyro successfully sued to void her management and recording contracts on the grounds that she had entered into them while still a minor. Geffen became her manager, and the two established a publishing company, Tuna Fish Music, under which the proceeds from her future compositions would be divided equally between them. Geffen also arranged Nyro's new recording contract with Clive Davis at Columbia Records, and purchased the publishing rights to her early compositions. In his memoir Clive: Inside the Record Business, Davis recalled Nyro's audition for him: She had invited him to her New York apartment, turned off every light except that of a television set next to her piano, and played him the material that would become Eli and the Thirteenth Confession. Around this time, she considered becoming lead singer for Blood, Sweat & Tears after the departure of founder Al Kooper, but was dissuaded by Geffen. Blood, Sweat & Tears went on to have a hit with a cover of Nyro's "And When I Die".

The new contract allowed Nyro more artistic freedom and control. In 1968, Columbia released Eli and the Thirteenth Confession, her second album, which received high critical praise for the depth and sophistication of its performance and arrangements, which merged pop structure with inspired imagery, rich vocals, and avant-garde jazz; it is widely considered one of her best works. It was followed in 1969 by New York Tendaberry, another highly acclaimed work that cemented Nyro's artistic credibility. "Time and Love" and "Save the Country" emerged as two of her most well-regarded and popular songs in the hands of other artists. During the weekend after Thanksgiving in November 1969, she gave two concerts at Carnegie Hall. Her own recordings sold mostly to a faithful cadre of followers. This prompted Clive Davis, in his memoir, to note that her recordings, as solid as they were, came to resemble demonstrations for other performers.

In 1969, Verve reissued Nyro's debut album as The First Songs. The same year Geffen and Nyro sold Tuna Fish Music to CBS for $4.5 million. Under the terms of his partnership with Nyro, Geffen received half of the proceeds of the sale, making them both millionaires.

Nyro's fourth album, Christmas and the Beads of Sweat, was released at the end of 1970. It contained "Upstairs By a Chinese Lamp" and "When I Was a Freeport and You Were the Main Drag" and featured Duane Allman and other Muscle Shoals musicians. The following year's Gonna Take a Miracle was a collection of Nyro's favorite "teenage heartbeat songs", recorded with vocal group Labelle (Patti LaBelle, Nona Hendryx, and Sarah Dash) and the production team of Kenny Gamble and Leon Huff. With the exception of her attribution of "Désiree" (originally "Deserie" by the Charts), it was Nyro's sole album of wholly non-original material, featuring such songs as "Jimmy Mack", "Nowhere to Run" and "Spanish Harlem".

During 1971, Geffen worked to establish his own recording label, Asylum Records, in part because of the trouble he had trying to secure a recording contract for another of his clients, Jackson Browne, with whom Nyro was in a relationship at the time. Geffen invited Nyro to join the new label and announced that she would be Asylum's first singer; however, shortly before the signing was due to take place, Geffen learned that Nyro had re-signed with Columbia instead, without telling him. When interviewed about the matter for a 2012 PBS documentary on his life, Geffen, who had considered Nyro his best friend, described her rejection as the biggest betrayal of his life up to that point, and said he "cried for days" afterwards.

By the end of 1971, Nyro was married to carpenter David Bianchini. She was reportedly uncomfortable with attempts to market her as a celebrity and she announced her retirement from the music business at the age of 24. In 1973, her Verve debut album was reissued as The First Songs by Columbia Records.

=== Later career ===
By 1976, her marriage had ended and she released an album of new material, Smile. She then embarked on a four-month tour with a full band, which resulted in the 1977 live album Season of Lights.

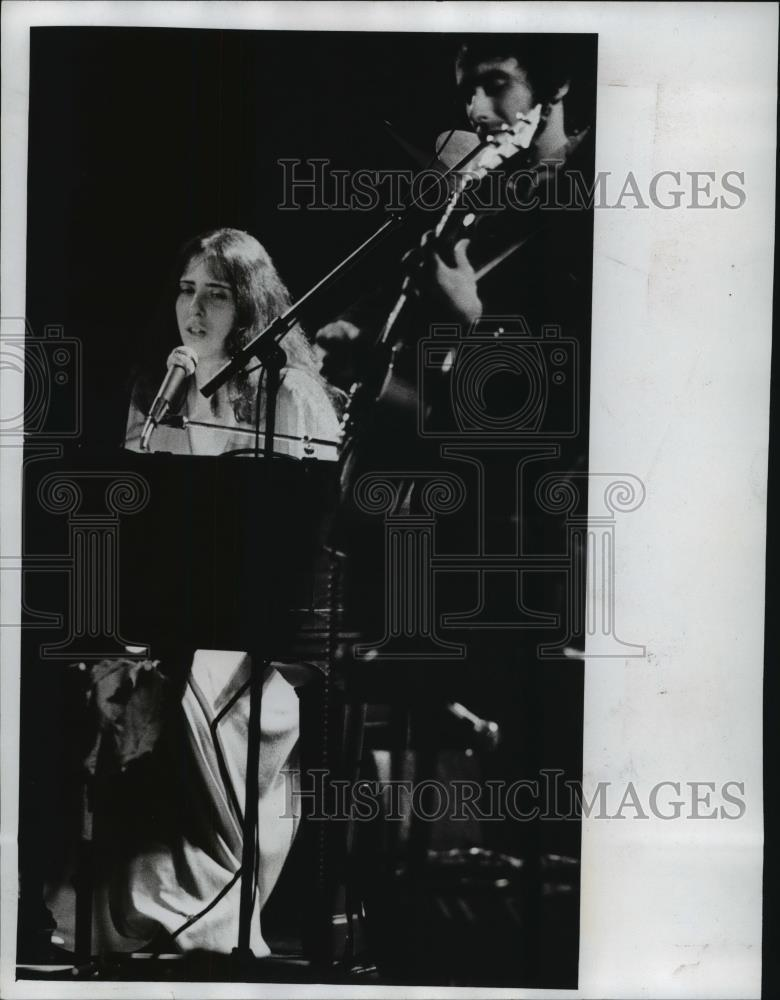
Nyro performing in 1976

After the 1978 album Nested, recorded when she was pregnant with her only child, she again took a break from recording, this time until 1984's Mother's Spiritual. She began touring with a band in 1988, her first concert appearances in 10 years. The tour was dedicated to the animal rights movement. The shows led to her 1989 release, Laura: Live at the Bottom Line, which included six new compositions.

Her final album of predominantly original material, Walk the Dog and Light the Light (1993), her last album for Columbia, was co-produced by Gary Katz, best known for his work with Steely Dan. The release sparked reappraisal of her place in popular music, and new commercial offers began appearing. She turned down lucrative film-composing offers, although she contributed a rare protest song to the Academy Award-winning documentary Broken Rainbow, about the unjust relocation of the Navajo people.

Nyro performed increasingly in the 1980s and 1990s with female musicians, including her friend Nydia "Liberty" Mata, a drummer, and several others from the lesbian-feminist women's music subculture, such as members of the band Isis. She appeared at such venues as the 1989 Michigan Womyn's Music Festival and the 1989 Newport Folk Festival, of which a CD containing portions of her performance was released. On July 4, 1991, she opened for Bob Dylan at the Tanglewood Music Center in Lenox, Massachusetts. Among her last performances were at Union Chapel, Islington, London, England in November 1994; The New York Bottom Line Christmas Eve Show in 1994; and at McCabe's in Los Angeles February 11 and 12, 1995.

The Tonight Show and the Late Show with David Letterman pursued Nyro for television appearances, but she turned them down, citing her discomfort with appearing on television. (She made only a handful of early TV appearances, and one fleeting moment on VH-1 performing the title song from Broken Rainbow on Earth Day in 1990.) According to producer Gary Katz, she also turned down an invitation to be the musical guest on the 1993 season opener of Saturday Night Live. She never released an official video, although there was talk of filming some of The Bottom Line appearances in the 1990s.

== Personal life ==
Nyro was bisexual, though this fact was known only to her closest friends. She had a perhaps year-long relationship with Blood, Sweat & Tears bassist Jim Fielder starting in 1968, and with Crosby, Stills and Nash drummer Dallas Taylor for about six months after that. She also had a brief relationship with singer-songwriter Jackson Browne in late 1970 to early 1971 (Browne was Nyro's opening act at the time.)

Nyro married Vietnam War veteran David Bianchini in October 1971 after a whirlwind romance and spent the next three years living with him in a small town in Massachusetts. The marriage ended after three years, during which time she had grown accustomed to rural life, as opposed to the life in the city, where she had recorded her first five records.

After Nyro split from Bianchini in 1975, she suffered the trauma of the death of her mother Gilda to ovarian cancer at the age of 49. She consoled herself largely by recording a new album, enlisting Charlie Calello, with whom she had collaborated on Eli and the Thirteenth Confession.

In 1978, a short-lived relationship with Harindra Singh produced a son, Gil Bianchini (also known as musician Gil-T), whom she gave the surname of her ex-husband.

In the early 1980s, Nyro began living with painter Maria Desiderio (1954–1999), a relationship that lasted 17 years, the rest of Nyro's life.

Nyro was a feminist and openly discussed it on a number of occasions, once saying, "I may bring a certain feminist perspective to my songwriting, because that's how I see life."

By the late 1980s, Nyro had become an animal rights activist and vegetarian, and began to offer literature on the subject at her concerts.

== Death ==
In late 1996, Nyro, like her mother, was diagnosed with ovarian cancer. After the diagnosis, Columbia Records, with Nyro's involvement, prepared a two-CD retrospective of material from her years at the label. She lived to see the release of Stoned Soul Picnic: The Best of Laura Nyro in 1997.

She died of ovarian cancer in Danbury, Connecticut, on April 8, 1997, at 49, the same age at which her mother died. Her ashes were scattered beneath a maple tree on the grounds of her house in Danbury.

== Legacy ==
=== Posthumous releases ===
Nyro's posthumous releases include Angel In The Dark (2001), which includes her final studio recordings made in 1994 and 1995, and The Loom's Desire (2002), a set of live recordings with solo piano and harmony singers from The Bottom Line Christmas shows of 1993 and 1994. Music greats like Joni Mitchell and Carole King were admirers of Laura Nyro. More recent female musicians, like Alicia Keys and Joustene Lorenz, also cite Nyro as a major influence on their work, personal politics and sexuality.

=== Influence ===
Nyro's influence on popular musicians has also been acknowledged by such artists as Joni Mitchell, Carole King, Tori Amos, Suzanne Vega, Bette Midler, Rickie Lee Jones, Elton John, Jackson Browne, Alice Cooper, Elvis Costello, Cyndi Lauper, Todd Rundgren, and Steely Dan.

Todd Rundgren stated that once he heard her, he "stopped writing songs like the Who and started writing songs like Laura."

Cyndi Lauper said that her rendition of the song "Walk On By", on her Grammy Award-nominated 2003 cover album At Last, was inspired by Nyro.

Elton John and Elvis Costello discussed Nyro's influence on both of them during the premiere episode of Costello's interview show Spectacle. When asked by the host if he could name three great performers/songwriters who have largely been ignored, John cited Nyro as one of his choices. He also addressed Nyro's influence on his 1970 song "Burn Down the Mission", from Tumbleweed Connection, in particular. "I idolized her," he concluded. "The soul, the passion, just the out and out audacity of the way her rhythmic and melody changes came was like nothing I've heard before."

Bruce Arnold, leader of the pioneering soft rock group Orpheus, was a fan of Nyro's music. They both worked with legendary studio drummer Bernard Purdie. While recording with Purdie, Arnold mentioned his love of Nyro's music, and the drummer responded with a story about Nyro: At Nyro's home one night in the late 1970s, Purdie mentioned that he was the uncredited drummer for Orpheus. Nyro got excited and brought him into a room where she kept her record collection. She pulled out well-worn copies of every Orpheus LP, as well as copies sealed for posterity.

Diane Paulus and Bruce Buschel co-created Eli's Comin', a musical revue of the songs of Nyro, which, among others, starred Anika Noni Rose.

Louis Greenstein and Kate Ferber wrote One Child Born: The Music of Laura Nyro, a one-woman show featuring Ferber and directed by Adrienne Campbell-Holt. One Child Born was developed at CAP21 in New York City and has sold out Joe's Pub and the Laurie Beechman Theatre in New York, World Cafe Live in Philadelphia, and other venues.

The Alvin Ailey American Dance Theater and the National Ballet of Canada have also included her music in their performances; notably, "Been On A Train" from Christmas and the Beads of Sweat, in which a woman describes watching her lover die from a drug overdose, comprises the second movement of Ailey's 1971 solo for Judith Jamison, Cry. Alvin Ailey choreographed Quintet in 1968 with 5 female members of his troupe dancing to several of Laura's songs from the first two albums.

On October 2, 2007, three-time Tony nominee Judy Kuhn released her new album Serious Playground: The Songs of Laura Nyro. The album, which debuted as a concert to a sold-out house at Lincoln Center's American Songbook Series in January 2007, includes several of Nyro's biggest hits ("Stoned Soul Picnic", "Stoney End") as well as some of her lesser known gems.

In 1992, English shoegaze/Britpop band Lush released a song about Laura Nyro ("Laura") on their first full-length album Spooky. Several of the band's songs (specifically those written by Emma Anderson) have echoed Nyro's music in their titles – "When I Die", "Single Girl". More recently, in 2012, Anderson has referred to Laura Nyro as "wondrous" on her Twitter account.

On her 2006 album Build a Bridge, the operatic/Broadway soprano Audra McDonald included covers of Nyro's songs "To a Child" and "Tom Cat Goodbye".

The musical theater composer Stephen Schwartz credits Nyro as a major influence on his work.

Alice Cooper has mentioned on his syndicated radio show that Laura Nyro is one of his favorite songwriters.

Jenny Lewis of Rilo Kiley, when promoting her 2006 solo album Rabbit Fur Coat repeatedly cited Nyro's 1971 album Gonna Take a Miracle as a big influence on her music. Lewis performed the first track on that album "I Met Him on a Sunday" on the Rabbit Fur Coat tour.

In the 2004 drama film A Home at the End of the World Nyro's recordings of "Désiree" and "It's Gonna Take a Miracle", both songs from the album Gonna Take a Miracle, can be heard .

Paul Shaffer, bandleader for the CBS Orchestra and sidekick on the Late Show with David Letterman, stated that his desert island album would be Eli and the Thirteenth Confession.

Paul Stanley of Kiss has mentioned on several occasions that he is a big admirer of Nyro's music.

Exene Cervenka of the punk rock band X listed Nyro as one of her favorite songwriters.

TV Girl dedicated the song "Laura" to Nyro. They also namecheck her in the 2016 song "Taking What's Not Yours" ("And how about my Laura Nyro record / She probably threw away when she moved").

=== Biographies, analyses and tributes ===
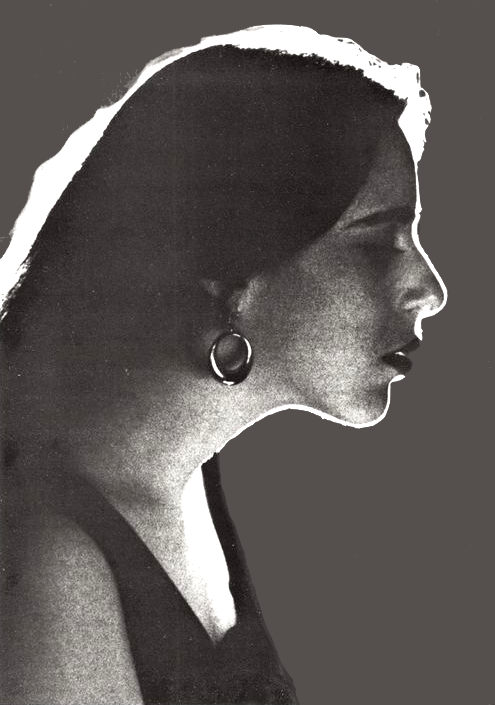
Nyro in a trade ad for Eli and the Thirteenth Confession

On October 27, 1997, a large-scale tribute concert was produced by women at the Beacon Theatre in New York. Performers included Rickie Lee Jones, Sandra Bernhard, Toshi Reagon, and Phoebe Snow.

And a World To Carry On, an original tribute show celebrating the music and life of Laura Nyro, written by Barry Silber and Carole Coppinger, was first performed in 2008 (2nd performance late August 2015) at Carrollwood Players Theatre in Tampa, Fla.

To Carry On, an original tribute show celebrating the music and life of Laura Nyro, starring Mimi Cohen, is in its second return engagement as of January 19, 2011, at Cherry Lane Theatre in Manhattan.

A biography of Nyro, Soul Picnic: The Music and Passion of Laura Nyro, written by Michele Kort, was published in 2002 by Thomas Dunne Books/St. Martin's Press. On Track: Laura Nyro, a detailed song-by-song survey by Philip Ward, was published by Sonicbond in 2022.

An analysis of Nyro's music by music theorist Ari Shagal was written at the University of Chicago in 2003, linking Nyro's work to the Great American Songbook by demonstrating the similarities between her chordal language and those of Harold Arlen, Harry Warren, and George Shearing.

Nyro's life and music were celebrated in a 2005 BBC Radio 2 documentary, Shooting Star – Laura Nyro Remembered, which was narrated by her friend Bette Midler and included contributions from her one-time manager David Geffen, co-producers Arif Mardin and Gary Katz, and performers Suzanne Vega and Janis Ian. It was rebroadcast on April 4, 2006.

Janis Ian, who attended the High School of Music and Art in New York at the same time as Nyro, discussed her friendship with Nyro during the late 1960s in her autobiography, Society's Child. Ian described her as looking like a "Morticia Addams" caricature with her long, dark hair, and called her a "brilliant songwriter" but "oddly inarticulate" in terms of musical terminology. Ian was a fan of Nyro's work with producer Charlie Calello and chose him as the producer of her 1969 album Who Really Cares on the basis of his work with Nyro.

Comedian, writer, and singer Sandra Bernhard has spoken extensively of Laura Nyro as an ongoing inspiration. She dedicated a song, "The Woman I Could've Been" on Excuses for Bad Behavior (Part One), to her. She also sang Nyro's "I Never Meant to Hurt You" in her film Without You I'm Nothing.

Rickie Lee Jones's album Pirates and songs such as "We Belong Together" and "Living It Up" are reminiscent of early Laura Nyro songs, and Jones acknowledged Nyro's influence. In her memoir, Last Chance Texaco, Jones describes discovering Nyro's music in the summer of 1970, saying "Somehow, the moment I fell in love with Laura I loved myself just a little more. I believe an invisible cord came out of me and attached itself to Laura Nyro that summer. Or vice versa."

Todd Rundgren has also acknowledged the strong influence of Nyro's 1960s music on his own songwriting. While a member of the pop group Nazz, his great admiration for Nyro led him to arrange a meeting with her (which took place shortly after she had recorded the Eli and the Thirteenth Confession LP). Nyro invited Rundgren to become the musical director of her backing group, but his commitments to Nazz obliged him to decline. Rundgren's debut solo album Runt (1970) includes the strongly Nyro-influenced "Baby Let's Swing" which was written about her and mentions her by name. Rundgren and Nyro remained friends for much of her professional career and he subsequently assisted her with the recording of her album Mother's Spiritual.

On April 14, 2012, Laura Nyro was inducted into the Rock and Roll Hall of Fame. The induction speech was delivered by singer Bette Midler and the award was accepted by her son, Gil Bianchini. The song "Stoney End" was performed by singer Sara Bareilles at the induction ceremony.

A hybrid daylily named for Laura Nyro was introduced in 2000.

The Scottish band Cosmic Rough Riders released a tribute song, "Laura Nyro," on their 2001 album Pure Escapism.

The song "Mean Streets" by the band Tennis is a tribute to Nyro.

Kanye West sampled Nyro on his widely acclaimed 2007 album Graduation.

TV Girl sampled Nyro on the intro for their song “Louise” in 2014.

On July 22, 2014, composer/arranger Billy Childs released Map to the Treasure: Reimagining Laura Nyro. The album features ten Laura Nyro songs performed by a long list of stars including Rickie Lee Jones, Shawn Colvin, Alison Krauss, Dianne Reeves, and Wayne Shorter. The album was nominated for three Grammys, with the "New York Tendaberry" track featuring Renee Fleming and Yo-Yo Ma winning for Best Arrangement, Instrumental and Vocals.

A documentary on Nyro was announced in 2022, which will be associate produced by her son Gil and partly based on the Michele Kort biography.

Elton John and Brandi Carlile, along with co-writers Andrew Watt and Bernie Taupin, paid tribute to Nyro in "The Rose of Laura Nyro," the lead-off track on John and Carlile's 2025 collaboration album Who Believes in Angels?. The track name checks her song, "Eli's Comin'" in the lyrics.

== Discography ==
=== Studio albums ===
- 1967 – More Than a New Discovery (later reissued as The First Songs) US No. 97
- 1968 – Eli and the Thirteenth Confession (reissued and remastered with bonus tracks, 2002, Columbia) US No. 181
- 1969 – New York Tendaberry (reissued and remastered with bonus tracks, 2002, Columbia) US No. 32
- 1970 – Christmas and the Beads of Sweat March 2008 – BMG Sony (US division) US No. 51
- 1971 – Gonna Take a Miracle (with Labelle) (reissued and remastered with bonus tracks, 2002, Columbia) US No. 46
- 1976 – Smile US No. 60
- 1978 – Nested (reissued and remastered, 2008)
- 1984 – Mother's Spiritual US No. 182
- 1993 – Walk the Dog and Light the Light
- 2001 – Angel in the Dark (posthumous album recorded 1994–1995)

=== Live albums ===
- 1977 – Season of Lights (reissued and remastered, 2008) US No. 137
- 1978 – American Dreamer (recorded live at Bottom Line, NYC, July 12, 1978 and remastered, 2016)
- 1989 – Laura: Live at the Bottom Line (recorded NYC, summer, 1988)
- 2000 – Live from Mountain Stage (recorded for radio program on November 11, 1990)
- 2002 – Live: The Loom's Desire (featuring the 1993 and 1994 Christmas Eve shows recorded at New York's Bottom Line)
- 2003 – Live in Japan (recorded live at Kintetsu Hall, Osaka, Japan on February 22, 1994)
- 2004 – Spread Your Wings and Fly: Live at the Fillmore East (May 30, 1971)
- 2013 – Live at Carnegie Hall: The Classic 1976 Radio Broadcast

=== Compilation albums ===
- 1972 – Laura Nyro sings her Greatest Hits (Japan only)
- 1973 – The First Songs (Columbia Records reissue of the 1967 Verve album)
- 1980 – Impressions
- 1997 – Stoned Soul Picnic: The Best of Laura Nyro (reissued 2011 as The Essential Laura Nyro, Sony Music)
- 1999 – Premium Best Collection-Laura Nyro (Japan only)
- 2000 – Time and Love: The Essential Masters
- 2006 – Laura Nyro-Collections (Sony Europe)
- 2017 – A Little Magic, A Little Kindness: The Complete Mono Albums Collection (Real Gone Music)
- 2021 – American Dreamer (Madfish)
- 2024 – Hear My Song: The Collection 1966-1995 (Madfish)

== Audio samples ==
Sweet Blindness
Laura Nyro, Sweet Blindness (Columbia, 1968)

Eli's Comin
Laura Nyro, Eli's Comin' (Columbia, 1968)
