= Nested =

Studio album by Laura Nyro
- Released: June 1978
- Recorded: Summer 1977 in Danbury, Connecticut
- Genre: Folk; soul
- Length: 37:13
- Label: Columbia (UK, US)
- Producer: Laura Nyro, Roscoe Harring

Laura Nyro chronology
Season of Lights (1977)	Nested (1978)	Impressions (1980)

Nested is the seventh studio album by Bronx-born singer, songwriter, and pianist Laura Nyro. It was released in 1978 on Columbia Records.

Following on from her extensive tour to promote 1976's Smile, which resulted in the 1977 live album Season of Lights, Nyro retreated to her new home in Danbury, Connecticut, where she lived after spending her time in the spotlight in New York City.

Nyro had a studio built at her home and recorded there the songs that comprised Nested. The songs deal with themes such as motherhood and womanhood, and Nyro is notably more relaxed in her singing on the album. The instrumentation is laid back and smooth, similar to that of Smile, but perhaps less jazz-inspired and more melodic. Nyro was assisted in production by Roscoe Harring, while Dale and Pop Ashby were chief engineers.

Critics praised the album as a melodic return to form, and Nyro supported the album with a solo tour when she was heavily pregnant with her son Gil, who was born two months after the album was released. Despite acclaim and a melodic, arguably more commercial sound, Nested was not a commercial success and became Nyro's first album since her 1967 debut More Than a New Discovery to miss the Billboard 200, then known as the Pop Albums chart.

Such was its commercial failure that for years it remained out of print and is unquestionably Nyro's least-known and most rare studio album. After the birth of her son in August 1978, she retreated once again from the limelight after a three-year return to raise her son. She did not record for another five years, and her recording pattern became increasingly intermittent.

Nested was briefly released on CD in Japan only and was out of print for many years. On April 8, 2008, it was reissued on CD in the US in remastered form by Iconoclassic Records.

Guitars were played by Vinnie Cusano, who later became the guitarist for KISS from 1982 to 1984 under the name Vinnie Vincent.

== Overview ==
Nested is the first of two "maternal" Laura Nyro albums, and she appears to revel in her new domesticity. Her marriage had broken down, but she had found love again and the sound is notably more relaxed than before.

Felix Cavaliere returns to play piano and organ on some songs, while Nyro produces with Roscoe Harring. The origins of Nyro's political and social explorations in her lyrics of the 1980s and 1990s can be traced back to Nested.

== Reception ==
Professional ratings
Review scores
Source	Rating
Allmusic	link

== Track listing ==
All tracks composed by Laura Nyro.

1. "Mr. Blue (Song of Communications)" – 5:01
2. "Rhythm and Blues" – 2:57
3. "My Innocence" – 3:24
4. "Crazy Love" – 4:18
5. "American Dreamer" – 4:08
6. "Springblown" – 4:24
7. "The Sweet Sky" – 3:32
8. "Light" – 2:53
9. "Child in a Universe" – 4:09
10. "The Nest" – 2:27

== Personnel ==
- Laura Nyro – vocals, electric and acoustic piano, church organ, guitar, strings
- Will Lee – bass guitar
- Andy Newmark – drums
- Vinnie Cusano – guitar
- John Tropea – guitar
- Nydia "Liberty" Mata – percussion
- John Sebastian – harmonica
- Cyril Cianflone – bass guitar on "Mr. Blue (The Song of Communications)"
- Tony Levin – bass guitar on "American Dreamer"
- Felix Cavaliere – electric piano on "The Sweet Sky", organ on "The Nest"

Technical

- Dale Ashby, Frank Koenig – engineer
- Adger W. Cowans – photography
