= John Tropea =

American guitarist (born 1946)

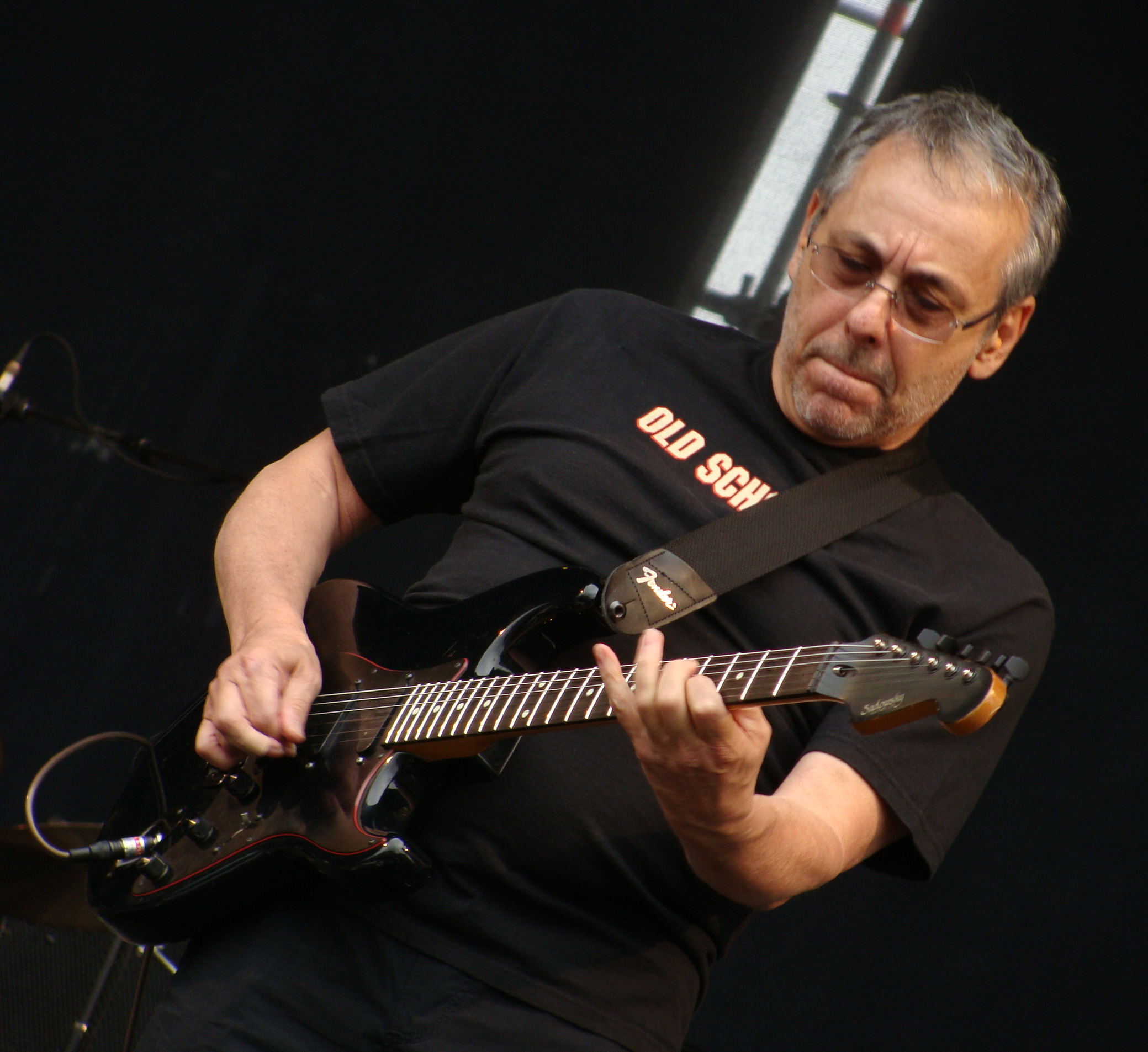
- Tropea performing in 2008

Background information
- Born: January 7, 1946 (age 80); New York City, U.S.
- Genres: Pop, funk, smooth jazz, soul jazz
- Occupation: Musician
- Instrument: Guitar
- Labels: Video Arts, DMP
- Website: www.johntropea.com

John Tropea (TRO-PAY; born January 7, 1946) is an American jazz guitarist and composer.

== Career ==
Tropea began guitar studies at the age of 12. His musical education continued at Berklee College of Music in Boston, where he studied jazz guitar, harmony, musical composition, and big band arranging. After arriving in Boston, Tropea began playing jazz and R&B with local bands, including The Three Degrees. He was influenced by Wes Montgomery, Johnny Smith, Luiz Bonfá, Pat Martino, and George Benson. Among his mentors were Hammond B3 organ players Jack McDuff and Jimmy Smith.

After Berklee, Tropea recorded and toured with Eumir Deodato. Moving to New York City in 1967, he became one of the most sought after session players. In 1974, he played on Van Morrison's "Bulbs" and "Cul de Sac" included on the album Veedon Fleece and issued as the single. Tropea wrote and produced three critically acclaimed solo albums for TK Records. His first solo album Tropea, was released in 1975, followed by Short Trip to Space, and To Touch You Again. With those early recordings and other projects, Tropea formed close musical alliances with other leading New York musicians such as Warren Bernhardt, Michael Brecker, Randy Brecker, Steve Gadd, Don Grolnick, Anthony Jackson, David Sanborn, David Spinozza, and Richard Tee.

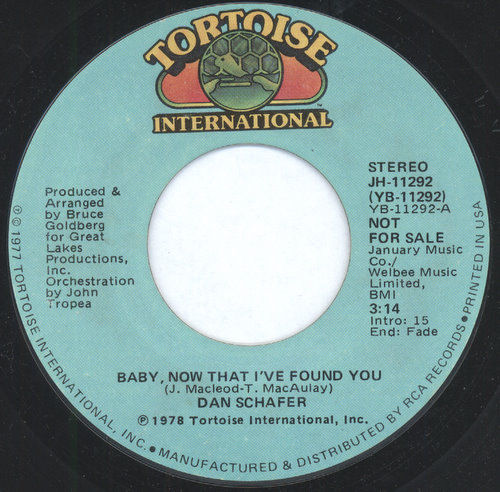
Dan Schafer 1977 Tortoise International/RCA 45 single

He played guitar on "Baby Now That I've Found You" recorded by Dan Schafer on Tortoise International Records, an RCA Records subsidiary released in 1977. In March 2012, this version was included on the compilation album, Perhaps...The Very Best of Dan Schafer. He has played with Billy Cobham, Eumir Deodato, Laura Nyro, Harry Chapin, Paul Simon, Eric Clapton, and Dr. John. Tropea has written and arranged music for film and broadcast advertising. With his frequent co-producer and friend Will Lee, he released Simple Way to Say 'I Love You' , and Something Old, New, Borrowed and Blues, live performances by The Tropea Band at Mikell's in New York City. He composed the song "Tambourine", which was used as the close for WABC's Eyewitness News broadcasts from 1977 to 1980.

== Discography ==
=== Solo ===
- Tropea (Marlin, 1975)
- Short Trip to Space (Marlin, 1977)
- To Touch You Again (Marlin, 1979)
- Live at Mikell's (Video Arts, 1982)
- NYC Cats Direct (DMP 1986)
- A Simple Way to Say I Love You (Video Arts, 1997)
- Something Old, New, Borrowed and Blues (Video Arts, 1999)
- Standard Influence (Video Arts, 2003)
- Standard Influence II: Rock Candy (Video Arts, 2005)
- Tropea 10: The Time Is Right (Video Arts, 2007)
- Take Me Back to the Ol' School (STP, 2007)
- Gotcha Rhythm Right Here (STP, 2014)

=== Guest appearances ===
With Peter Allen

- Continental American (A&M, 1974)
- I Could Have Been a Sailor (A&M, 1979)

With Patti Austin

- Body Language (CTI, 1980)
- In My Life (CTI, 1983)

With Eumir Deodato

- Also Sprach Zarathustra (2001 Theme) (CTI, 1972)
- Deodato 2 (CTI, 1973)
- Whirlwinds (MCA, 1974)
- Artistry (MCA, 1974)
- First Cuckoo (MCA, 1975)

With Michael Franks

- Burchfield Nines (Warner Bros., 1978)
- Passionfruit (Warner Bros., 1983)

With Laura Nyro

- 1975: Smile (Columbia, 1976)
- 1977: Nested (CBS, 1978)

With others

- Luiz Bonfá, Jacaranda (Ranwood, 1973)
- Billy Cobham, Spectrum (Atlantic, 1973)
- Mark Murphy, Mark II (Muse, 1973)
- Bo Diddley, Big Bad Bo (Chess, 1974)
- Blue Mitchell, Many Shades of Blue (Mainstream, 1974)
- Van Morrison, Veedon Fleece (Warner Bros., 1974)
- Bonnie Raitt, Streetlights (Warner Bros., 1974)
- Sonny Stitt, Satan (Cadet, 1974)
- Paul Simon, Still Crazy After All These Years (Columbia, 1975)
- Dionne Warwick, Then Came You (Warner Bros., 1975)
- Lalo Schifrin, Black Widow (CTI, 1976)
- Phoebe Snow, Second Childhood (Columbia, 1976)
- Roberta Flack, Blue Lights in the Basement (Atlantic, 1977)
- Intergalactic Touring Band, Intergalactic Touring Band (Passport, 1977)
- Lalo Schifrin, Towering Toccata (CTI, 1977)
- Ringo Starr, Ringo the 4th (Polydor, 1977)
- Frankie Valli, Lady Put the Light Out (Private Stock, 1977)
- Barbra Streisand, Songbird (Columbia, 1978)
- Peter Criss, Peter Criss (Casablanca, 1978)
- Randy Crawford, Raw Silk (Warner Bros., 1979)
- Art Farmer, Yama (CTI, 1979)
- Stephen Bishop, Red Cab to Manhattan (Warner Bros., 1980)
- Roberta Flack, Roberta Flack Featuring Donny Hathaway (Atlantic, 1980)
- Spyro Gyra, Morning Dance (MCA, 1980)
- Ray Barretto, La Cuna (CTI, 1981)
- Peter Baumann, Repeat Repeat (Virgin, 1981)
- Ron Carter, Super Strings (Milestone, 1981)
- Odyssey, Native New Yorker (1977), I Got the Melody (RCA, 1981)
- Irene Cara, Anyone Can See (Network, 1982)
- Gloria Gaynor, Gloria Gaynor (Atlantic, 1982)
- Claus Ogerman and Michael Brecker, Cityscape (Warner Bros., 1982)
- Yoko Ono, It's Alright (I See Rainbows) (Polydor, 1982)
- John Lennon and Yoko Ono, Milk and Honey (Polydor, 1984)
- Chaka Khan, CK (Warner Bros., 1988)
- Eric Clapton, Journeyman (Reprise, 1989)
- Liza Minnelli, Gently (Angel, 1996)
