= Jim Bessman =

American writer and journalist (1952–2021)

- Born: July 19, 1952; Milwaukee, Wisconsin, U.S.
- Died: June 22, 2021 (aged 68); New York City, U.S.
- Occupation: Journalist

Jim Bessman (July 19, 1952 – June 22, 2021) was an American writer and music journalist. He is best known as a music journalist, having written for Billboard magazine and numerous other publications, liner notes for albums, covering the Songwriters Hall of Fame induction ceremonies, and as an author of "The Ramones – An American Band" and "John Mellencamp – The Concert at Walter Reed".

Bessman was a voting member of the Rock and Roll Hall of Fame.

== Early life and education ==
Bessman was born July 19, 1952, in Milwaukee, Wisconsin. He grew up in Madison and began writing freelance for Variety while in Wisconsin.

== Career ==
Bessman relocated to New York to work at Cashbox. He was hired by Timothy White at Billboard to write the Songwriting and Publishing column, and continued to contribute stories for over twenty-five years, later preferring to remain freelance. He wrote for Spin, Country Rhythms, CenterlineNews.com, his own website blog and other publications.

Bessman wrote liner notes for more than eighty albums. Ann Powers refers to Bessman's liner notes in her New York Times review of Jane Siberry's 1997 album Child.

== Death ==
Bessman died from an aneurysm in Manhattan on June 22, 2021.

== Reception ==
Linda Moran, president of the Songwriters Hall of Fame was quoted as saying: "...he was a great historian...he knew hidden facts about everything. He was a great fan of songwriters..."
