= Michele Kort =

American author, journalist, editor (1950–2015)

Michele Kort (January 30, 1950 – June 26, 2015) was an American journalist, author, and editor.

== Early life and education ==
Michele Kort was born January 30, 1950, and was raised in California's San Fernando Valley.

She attended the University of California, Los Angeles, where she received both a Bachelor's in Art History in 1971 and a Master of Business in Arts Management in 1975.

== Career ==
=== Early career ===
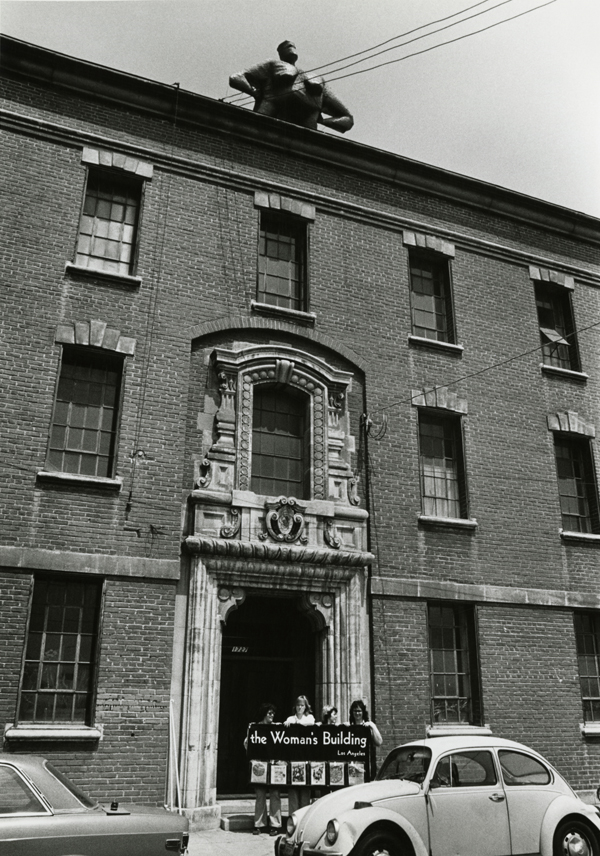
Kort worked an administrator at the Woman's Building in Los Angeles

While completing her MBA, Kort became involved with the Women's Building, an early feminist art space in Los Angeles, where she served as an early administrator and would later serve as director. Kort remained passionate about feminist art, as well as other forms of women's cultural production, a passion which often found its way into her work as a journalist. Of particular interest to Kort was women's sports, and she herself played basketball at UCLA in the 1960s and 1970s, before the advent of Title IX.

=== Journalism ===
Kort's award-winning career in journalism began with The Grantsmanship News and spanned many decades.

Kort served as the senior editor of Ms. Magazine, from 2003 – 2015. During her tenure, she played a major role in developing online content for the publication and mentored many young women writers. Other publications Kort worked on include "Songwriter," "Living Fit," and "UCLA Magazine." As a freelance journalist, her articles have been featured in LA Times Magazine, The Advocate, Ms., L.A. Weekly, Women's Sports and Fitness, and Vegetarian Times. Kort was the author of four published books.

Soul Picnic: The Music and Passion of Laura Nyro was the first published biography of '60s musician Laura Nyro.

== Death ==
Kort died on June 26, 2015.

== Works ==
- Tenure in Museums (1974) Los Angeles: Graduate School of Management, UCLA [with Jacquelyn Maguire]
- Some of My Friends (1975) Los Angeles: Women's Community Press
- The Big Search (1977) Los Angeles: Grantmanship Center [with Philicia Malo]
- The End of Innocence: A Memoir (2002) Los Angeles: Advocate Books [with Chaz Bono]
- Soul Picnic: The Music and Passion of Laura Nyro (2003) New York: St. Martin's Press
- Dinah!: Three Decades of Sex, Golf, and Rock 'n' Roll (2005) Los Angeles: Alyson Books
- Here Come the Brides: Reflections on Lesbian Love and Marriage (2012) Berkeley, Calif.: Seal Press [with Audrey Bilger]

== Awards ==
- Deems Taylor Award
- Western Publishing Association
- ASCAP: 1980, for music journalism
- Council for Advancement and Support of Education (CASE): 1991, for advancement of the support of education
- Women's Sports Foundation: 1993, Miller Light women's Sports Journalism Award
- L.A. Press Club: 1994, journalism award
