= New York Tendaberry =

Studio album by Laura Nyro
- Released: September 24, 1969
- Recorded: September 1968–July 1969 in New York City
- Genre: Pop
- Length: 46:15
- Label: Columbia
- Producers: Laura Nyro; Roy Halee

Laura Nyro chronology
Eli and the Thirteenth Confession (1968)	New York Tendaberry (1969)	Christmas and the Beads of Sweat (1970)

Singles from New York Tendaberry
- 1. "Time and Love"/"The Man Who Sends Me Home" Released: October 1969; 2. "Save the Country"/"New York Tendaberry" Released: January 1970

Professional ratings
Review scores
Source	Rating
AllMusic	4.5/5 stars
Pitchfork	9.4/10

New York Tendaberry is the third album by New York City-born singer, songwriter, and pianist Laura Nyro. It was released in the autumn of 1969, on Columbia Records, some eighteen months after its predecessor, Eli and the Thirteenth Confession. It was helmed by her, with the assistance of producer and engineer Roy Halee. The cover photograph was taken by David Gahr.

New York Tendaberry is also considered to be the second in a trilogy of classic original Nyro records, with Eli and Christmas and the Beads of Sweat on either side. They are all considered musically and thematically similar, although New York Tendaberry is the most intense and stark.

In 1969, Nyro was one of the most popular pop songwriters, and various groups including the 5th Dimension, Three Dog Night, and Blood, Sweat & Tears had enjoyed hits with her compositions. Thanks to the strong word of mouth trailing her work, New York Tendaberry became her most commercially successful record, peaking at No. 32 on the Billboard 200, formerly known as the Pop Albums chart.

The 5th Dimension reached US No. 27 on the Pop Singles chart (the Billboard Hot 100) with their version of "Save the Country", while artists including Barbra Streisand recorded "Time and Love".

In 2003, the album was included in Mojo's Collection book of the best albums of all time, and the reissued version was voted among the Best Albums of 2002 in Uncut magazine.

== Overview ==
New York Tendaberry is strongly influenced by Nyro's hometown, New York City.

Nyro sings of lovers and romances in a notably darker tone than on her previous album Eli and the Thirteenth Confession.

Musically, New York Tendaberry is far more intimate than any other Nyro album. Multi-layered instrumentation is less than on previous efforts, as some songs were built around her voice and piano, though the use of strings and classical instrumentation is notable.

Nyro guided co-producer and engineer Roy Halee using color metaphors. She could not understand musical notation, and used other analogies to communicate what she wanted.

The album also uses sound effects such as the gunshot on "Mercy on Broadway" and the twinkling sky in "New York Tendaberry". Alongside Nyro's piano is a jazz band, an orchestra, and a rock band, though they are used more sparingly than on her previous two releases.

The album was released after a year of night-time recording sessions, and is considered by most to be Nyro's artistic highpoint.

== Reissues ==
The Legacy imprint of Columbia Records reissued the album in remastered and expanded format during the summer of 2002 alongside similar reissues of Eli and the Thirteenth Confession and Gonna Take a Miracle.

The reissue featured the previously unreleased song "In the Country Way," recorded by Nyro in 1971, as well as the mono single version of "Save the Country", which was recorded in the summer of 1968, in an attempt to give Nyro her first chart hit. This attempt backfired, and she stuck to her solo piano renditions for the New York Tendaberry album.

The accompanying booklet features photographs, lyrics, and recording details, as well as new liner notes by David Fricke and a back-cover reminiscence from Suzanne Vega. The reissued version was voted among Uncut magazine's Best Albums of 2002.

Pure Pleasure Records added the album to their catalog in 2008. The remastering was done by Ray Staff using the original analog tapes, and it brings the original artwork in a gatefold cover and an audiophile record vinyl in 180 grams.

== Track listing ==
All tracks are written by Laura Nyro.

Side one
No.	Title	Length
1.	"You Don't Love Me When I Cry"	4:24
2.	"Captain for Dark Mornings"	4:38
3.	"Tom Cat Goodbye"	5:32
4.	"Mercy on Broadway"	2:18
5.	"Save the Country"	4:36

Side two
No.	Title	Length
6.	"Gibsom Street"	4:47
7.	"Time and Love"	4:24
8.	"The Man Who Sends Me Home"	2:52
9.	"Sweet Lovin' Baby"	3:55
10.	"Captain Saint Lucifer"	3:17
11.	"New York Tendaberry"	5:33

2002 reissue bonus tracks
No.	Title	Length
12.	"Save the Country" (Single version) (Mono, recorded July 1968 in Los Angeles, produced by Bones Howe)	2:26
13.	"In the Country Way" (recorded May 18, 1971 in Nashville, produced by Richard Chiaro)	2:10

== Personnel ==
- Laura Nyro – piano, vocals, arrangements
- Jimmie Haskell – conductor, orchestral arrangements
- Gary Chester – drums
- Roy Halee – producer, engineer
- David L. Geffen – management and friend
- David Gahr – cover photography
