= Eli and the Thirteenth Confession =

Studio album by Laura Nyro
- Released: March 3, 1968
- Recorded: January–February 1968
- Genres: Pop; blue-eyed soul; folk jazz
- Length: 46:15
- Label: Columbia
- Producers: Laura Nyro; Charlie Calello

Laura Nyro chronology
More Than a New Discovery (1967)	Eli and the Thirteenth Confession (1968)	New York Tendaberry (1969)

Singles from Eli and the Thirteenth Confession
- 1. "Once It Was Alright Now (Farmer Joe)"/"Lu" Released: April 1968; 2. "Eli's Comin'"/"Sweet Blindness" Released: June 1968; 3. "Stoned Soul Picnic"/"Sweet Blindness" Released: October 1968

Professional ratings
Review scores
Source	Rating
AllMusic	5/5 stars
The Austin Chronicle	5/5 stars
The Guardian	5/5 stars
Rolling Stone	(positive)

Eli and the Thirteenth Confession is the second album by New York City-born singer, songwriter and pianist Laura Nyro, released in 1968.

== History ==
Nyro premiered some of the songs that were to appear on the album at the 1967 Monterey Pop Festival. The song "Luckie" was derived from an earlier composition Nyro had played at her audition for Verve Records in 1966. Before she signed to Columbia Records, Verve had already planned to release the album under the title Soul Picnic. The album saw its actual release in 1968 on the Columbia label and became one of the year's underground successes. The album was written entirely by Nyro, arranged by Charlie Calello and produced by both.

The front cover photo was taken by Bob Cato. Writer Michele Kort said that Nyro resembled a "dark Madonna with luxuriant red lips." The back cover is a black-and-white silhouetted photo of Nyro kissing the head of what appears to be her younger self. According to Nyro, she was "kissing seventeen years of her life—her childhood—goodbye." On Nyro's insistence, the album's lyric sheet was printed with perfumed ink and Kort wrote in 2002 that it still maintained a pleasant scent.

The album's themes are of passion, love, romance, death, and drugs, and the songs are delivered in Nyro's distinctive brash, belting vocals. Musically, it is a multi-layered and opulent work, including multi-tracked vocals and strings. Although loosely categorised as pop the album also incorporates elements of soul, gospel, jazz and rock.

The album is generally considered to be her most accessible work, even if arguably not the most commercially successful or critically favored (both honors go to the follow-up, New York Tendaberry). The album was her first chart entry, reaching No. 181 on the Billboard 200, when it was known as "Pop Albums." In the February 2016 issue of Uncut magazine, it was ranked as the 100th greatest album of all time. Many musicians, including Elton John and Todd Rundgren were directly influenced by the album, and bandleader Paul Shaffer told CBC Television's George Stroumboulopoulos that he considers this album to be his one "desert island record".

The album is second only to its predecessor, 1967's More Than a New Discovery, in producing hit songs for other artists. Three Dog Night took "Eli's Comin'" to US No. 10, while The 5th Dimension went to US No. 3 with "Stoned Soul Picnic" and US No. 13 with "Sweet Blindness".

== Legacy and impact ==
The legacy of the album is prominent on the 1997 compilation Stoned Soul Picnic: The Best of Laura Nyro, which includes six songs from the 1968 album.

Six songs from Eli and the Thirteenth Confession are included in the ballet Quintet performed by the Alvin Ailey American Dance Theater. Rolling Stone ranked it No. 463 in the 2020 edition of their 500 Greatest Albums of All Time.

Eli has grown in reputation and regularly garners acclaim. It is now recognized as a groundbreaking album in pop music. In April 1997, Stephen Holden of The New York Times deemed it one of the late-'60s "most influential pop recordings". He cited Nyro's "fiercely emotional singing" and the songs' "abrupt changes of tempo and style" as reasons why it was "unlike anything that had been heard" in the genre. Later that month, Entertainment Weekly's Alanna Nash wrote that the album confirmed Nyro as "pop's high priestess" and called her one of the genre's "most influential American songwriters."

Eli has been widely credited with laying the foundation for various musicians. Holden saw Nyro kickstart a lasting genre of "quirky, reflective songwriting" led by women. In 2015, Vivien Goldman for The Vinyl Factory wrote that it not only "instantly transfixed a generation" but had "still [been] extensively mined by other artists" years later. She credited it, alongside her next two albums, with shaping the "personal, opera-tinged" style of musicians Kate Bush, Cyndi Lauper, Tori Amos and Alicia Keys.

== Reissues ==
Eli and the Thirteenth Confession was reissued in expanded and remastered format during the summer of 2002. The reissue was produced by Al Quaglieri, with Laura Grover as project director. The reissue featured three previously unreleased demos recorded on November 29, 1967. The 20-year-old Nyro performed the spare, solo demos of "Lu", "Stoned Soul Picnic" and "Emmie" on piano and multi-tracked her own voice to add harmonies. The accompanying booklet includes photographs and recording details as well as liner notes by Rick Petreycik and a back-cover recollection by Phoebe Snow. The remastered version was issued alongside remastered/expanded editions of New York Tendaberry and Gonna Take a Miracle.

In August 2011 the album was re-released in audiophile vinyl by label "Music on Vinyl", using high-resolution digital audio at 96 kHz / 24 bit.

In June 2016, Audio Fidelity reissued the album on hybrid Super Audio CD. It contains the original stereo version in high-resolution digital audio as well as a previously unreleased 4-channel quadraphonic mix, which was created in 1971. Prior to this release, only one track, "Eli's Comin'", had been released in quad - on a rare Columbia Records sampler LP. It was later also released as a quadraphonic SACD in a luxury 7 inch package by Sony Japan.

== Track listing ==
All tracks are written by Laura Nyro.

Side one
No.	Title	Length
1.	"Luckie"	3:00
2.	"Lu"	2:44
3.	"Sweet Blindness"	2:37
4.	"Poverty Train"	4:16
5.	"Lonely Women"	3:32
6.	"Eli's Comin'"	3:58

Side two
No.	Title	Length
7.	"Timer"	3:22
8.	"Stoned Soul Picnic"	3:47
9.	"Emmie"	4:20
10.	"Woman's Blues"	3:46
11.	"Once It Was Alright Now (Farmer Joe)"	2:58
12.	"December's Boudoir"	5:05
13.	"The Confession"	2:50

2002 reissue bonus tracks
No.	Title	Length
14.	"Lu" (Demo)	2:37
15.	"Stoned Soul Picnic" (Demo)	3:37
16.	"Emmie" (Demo)	4:25

== Personnel ==
- Laura Nyro – piano, keyboards, vocals, harmonies, "witness to the confession"
- Chet Amsterdam – acoustic guitar, bass guitar
- Ralph Casale – acoustic guitar
- Hugh McCracken – electric guitar
- Chuck Rainey – bass guitar
- Artie Schroeck – drums, vibes
- Buddy Saltzman – drums
- Dave Carey – percussion
- Bernie Glow, Pat Calello, Ernie Royal – trumpet
- George Young, Zoot Sims – saxophone
- Wayne Andre, Jimmy Cleveland, Ray DeSio – trombone
- Joe Farrell – saxophone, flute
- Paul Griffin – piano on "Eli's Comin'" and "Once It Was Alright Now (Farmer Joe)"

Technical

- Charlie Calello – producer, arrangements
- Roy Segal, Stan Tonkel – engineer
- David Geffen – management "agent and friend"
- Bob Cato – photography

== Bibliography ==
- Michele Kort, Soul Picnic: The Music and Passion of Laura Nyro, ISBN 0-312-20941-X
