= Stoned Soul Picnic: The Best of Laura Nyro =

Greatest hits album by Laura Nyro
- Released: February 18, 1997
- Recorded: 1966–1994
- Genre: Pop
- Length: 118:42
- Label: Columbia
- Producer: Laura Nyro

Laura Nyro chronology
Walk the Dog and Light the Light (1993)	Stoned Soul Picnic: The Best of Laura Nyro (1997)	Time and Love: The Essential Masters (2000)

Professional ratings
Review scores
Source	Rating
Allmusic	link
Uncut	4/5 stars

Stoned Soul Picnic: The Best of Laura Nyro is the second retrospective album by American musician Laura Nyro and the most comprehensive overview of her work to date.

It was the last album Nyro released during her lifetime, and she died from ovarian cancer less than two months after its release. The two-disc set combines highlights from all of her studio albums, as well as some rarities and previously unreleased live songs recorded in 1993 and 1994. Music journalist Paul Zollo's interview with Nyro makes up the liner notes, along with a Nyro biography and song details.

== Overview ==
Stoned Soul Picnic: The Best of Laura Nyro came about in 1996 when the Legacy imprint of Columbia Records requested a single-disc overview of Nyro's work. However, that would have concentrated on her earlier material, and Nyro was adamant that a full career overview should be achieved.

Nyro oversaw the production of the album, and made the track selection her final artistic project. The first disc collects some of her finest and most well-known material from 1966 to 1970, while the second disc concentrates on her later career.

== Track listing ==
Disc 1 – all songs by Laura Nyro

1. "Wedding Bell Blues" – 2:53
2. "Blowin' Away" – 2:19
3. "Billy's Blues" – 3:16
4. "Stoney End" – 2:44
5. "And When I Die" – 2:38
6. "Lu" – 2:44
7. "Eli's Comin'" – 3:56
8. "Stoned Soul Picnic" –;3:47
9. "Timer" – 3:23
10. "Emmie" – 4:19
11. "The Confession" – 2:48
12. "Captain Saint Lucifer" – 3:12
13. "Gibsom Street" – 4:41
14. "New York Tendaberry" – 5:33
15. "Save the Country" [single mix] – 2:24
16. "Blackpatch" – 3:33
17. "Upstairs By a Chinese Lamp" – 5:33
18. "Beads of Sweat" – 4:47
19. "When I Was a Freeport and You Were the Main Drag" – 2:41

Disc 2 – all songs by Laura Nyro except songs 1–2

1. "I Met Him on a Sunday" (Doris Coley, Addie Harris, Beverly Lee, Shirley Owens) – 1:49
2. "The Bells" (Marvin Gaye, Anna Gordy Gaye, Iris Gordy, Elgie Stover) – 2:58
3. "Smile" – 5:34
4. "Sweet Blindness" [live version] – 3:51
5. "Money" [live version] – 5:52
6. "Mr. Blue" – 5:00
7. "A Wilderness" – 2:57
8. "Mother's Spiritual" – 3:16
9. "A Woman of the World" – 4:10
10. "Louise's Church" – 3:32
11. "Broken Rainbow" – 3:51
12. "To a Child" – 3:31
13. "Lite a Flame (The Animal Rights Song)" – 3:17
14. "And When I Die" [live from the Bottom Line] – 2:48
15. "Save the Country" [live from the Bottom Line] – 2:42
