= Christmas and the Beads of Sweat =

Studio album by Laura Nyro
- Released: November 25, 1970
- Recorded: May 1970 in New York City
- Genre: Soul
- Length: 44:55
- Label: Columbia
- Producers: Felix Cavaliere; Arif Mardin

Laura Nyro chronology
New York Tendaberry (1969)	Christmas and the Beads of Sweat (1970)	Gonna Take a Miracle (1971)

Singles from Christmas and the Beads of Sweat
- 1. "Up on the Roof"/"Captain Saint Lucifer" Released: August 1970; 2. "When I Was a Freeport and You Were the Main Drag"/"Been on a Train" Released: January 1971

Professional ratings
Review scores
Source	Rating
Allmusic	4/5 stars
Christgau's Record Guide	C+
Rolling Stone	(mixed)

Christmas and the Beads of Sweat is the fourth album by New York-born singer, songwriter, and pianist Laura Nyro. The album was released on the Columbia Records label in November 1970 after Nyro had recorded it in the early summer with producers Felix Cavaliere and Arif Mardin. Whilst Nyro had handed over production reins, she was still in control of the project and co-arranged her compositions.

The album is the closing part of a trilogy that also comprises 1968's Eli and the Thirteenth Confession and 1969's New York Tendaberry. Musically, the album is a bridge between the two, balancing the lighter and more joyful tones of Eli with the dark, sensual, and piano-dominated Tendaberry.

The presence of The Muscle Shoals Rhythm Section on side one lends the album a more easygoing, rock-inspired sound, but this is countered by Nyro's evocative lyrics and moody piano delivery. Nyro had by this time built up a strong reputation as a songwriter, and the album features star turns from Duane Allman, who adds a guitar solo to the driving "Beads of Sweat," and Alice Coltrane, who adds harp to side two.

The album, buoyed by Nyro's popularity as a songwriter, became her second commercially successful album in succession, peaking at No. 51 on the Billboard 200 Pop Albums chart. The album is also responsible for spawning Nyro's sole chart hit single, with a cover of Gerry Goffin and Carole King's "Up on the Roof," which peaked at No. 92 on the Pop Singles chart, now known as the Billboard Hot 100.

== Track listing ==
All songs written by Laura Nyro, except where noted.

Side one

1. "Brown Earth" – 4:09
2. "When I Was a Freeport and You Were the Main Drag" – 2:42
3. "Blackpatch" – 3:33
4. "Been on a Train" – 5:49
5. "Up on the Roof" (Gerry Goffin, Carole King) – 3:13

Side two

6. "Upstairs by a Chinese Lamp" – 5:34
7. "Map to the Treasure" – 8:08
8. "Beads of Sweat" – 4:47
9. "Christmas in My Soul" – 7:00

== Personnel ==
- Laura Nyro – piano, vocals, arrangements

Additional musicians on side one

- Barry Beckett – vibraphone
- Felix Cavaliere – organ, bells, producer
- David Hood – bass guitar
- Roger Hawkins – drums
- Eddie Hinton – electric guitar
- Jack Jennings – percussion
- Stuart Scharf – acoustic guitar

Other musicians The album credits these musicians but does not indicate which tracks they played on.

- Duane Allman – guitar
- Richard Davis – bass guitar

Additional musicians on side two

- Alice Coltrane – harp
- Dino Danelli – drums
- Cornell Dupree – electric guitar
- Joe Farrell – woodwinds
- Ashod Garabedian – oud
- Ralph MacDonald – percussion
- Chuck Rainey – bass guitar
- Michael Szittai – cimbalon

Technical

- Arif Mardin – arrangements, conductor, producer
- Roy Segal – engineer
- Tim Geelan – engineer
- Jerry Lee Smith – assistant engineer
- Doug Pomeroy – assistant engineer
- Beth O'Brien – cover portrait
