= Porche Foreign Auto =

American auto wrecker

Coordinates: 33.954769°N 118.230876°W

- Industry: Vehicle recycling
- Founded: April 22, 1980
- Headquarters: 8935 Alameda St, Los Angeles, California
- Website: Archived official website at the Wayback Machine (archived 2024-07-06)

Porche Foreign Auto Wrecking, Inc. is an American vehicle recycling business that has been in operation since 1980. The business, known colloquially as PorFor, was founded in Los Angeles by Rudi Klein (1936–2001), a German immigrant who began purchasing wrecked European exotic cars in the late 1960s and incorporated his business in 1980. Over the course of his career, Klein amassed a vast collection of highly valuable vehicles that were left in derelict condition. In the 21st century, Porche Foreign Auto gained notability in the media for its secrecy and for several of the ultra-rare vehicles it owned. After the owner's death, his family gradually began selling off cars from the collection. In October 2024, the remainder of the junkyard's contents will be auctioned by RM Sotheby's, with the full collection estimated to be in the tens of millions of dollars.

== History ==
Rudi Klein was born in Rüsselsheim am Main in 1936 and began his career as a butcher. Around 1961 he immigrated to Canada, and then moved to the United States shortly thereafter. In the late 1960s, Klein purchased his first wrecked car, a Mercedes-Benz 300 SL. Following this, he continued to purchase wrecked German cars from insurance companies and auctions. In 1971, he and a friend opened a scrapyard under and unknown name. Other early purchases included a Mercedes-Benz that had belonged to Burt Lancaster, a Rolls-Royce convertible that had belonged to Tony Curtis, and a Ferrari 250 LM that had belonged to Sonny and Cher. During the 1973 oil crisis, Klein amassed huge numbers of European cars for fractions of their value. In the mid-1970s, he acquired at least 20 Mercedes-Benz 300 SLs, which he sent back to Germany for resale at substantial profit. In 1980, Klein incorporated his business as Porche Foreign Auto Wrecking, Inc. The business name excluded the "s" from "Porsche" purposefully to avoid lawsuit.

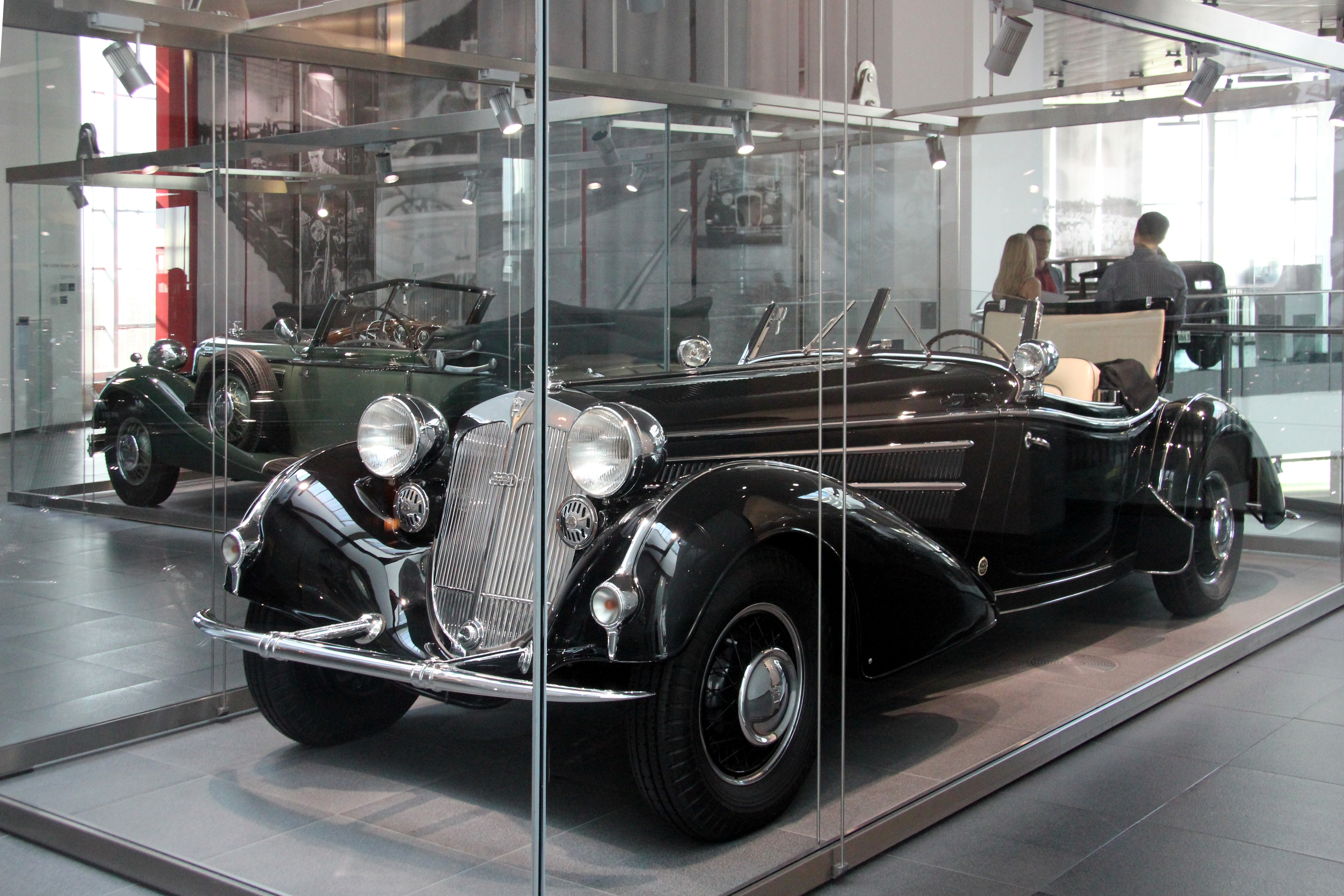
The PorFor Horch 855 on display at the Audi museum mobile in 2013.

At its peak, the inventory of Porche Foreign Auto comprised around 5,000 cars, including 2,000 Porsches and 1,500 Mercedes. Highlights of the junkyard included the 1935 Mercedes-Benz 500K built for Rudolf Caracciola; three Lamborghini Miuras; a 1939 Horch 855; and an alloy-bodied 1956 Mercedes-Benz 300 SL. In 1998, Klein worked with Ferdinand Piëch to loan his Horch 855 and Horch 780 to the Audi museum mobile, on the condition that Audi would undertake a full restoration of the 855. The cars were loaned for a 20-year period.

Klein died on October 21, 2001 at age 65. After his death, his sons Jason and Benjamin took over the business, while his wife Barbara became the chief executive officer. The business launched a website in late 1999, and after Rudi's death, his sons began selling off the cars bit by bit. The Porche Foreign Auto collection remained closed to the public and shrouded in secrecy. In the late 1990s, author Roland Löwisch and photographer Dieter Rebmann gained access to the property to document the collection. In 2017, the pair published a book called Junk Yard in German based on the visit, and in 2020 published an English translation. Periodically, automotive magazines would publish features on the junkyard. In 2012, Town & Country published a feature.

In August 2024, RM Sotheby's announced that it would be auctioning the remaining contents of Porche Foreign Auto in October of that year. The collection would be sold in two auctions. The first, called "The Junkyard: The Rudi Klein Collection," includes 208 lots, including the most valuable cars, and will take place in-person on October 26. The second, called, "The Junkyard: Online," will take place from 26 to 28 October and includes 359 lots. Leading up to the auction, many prominent automotive YouTube channels – including those of Magnus Walker, Top Gear, and the Petersen Automotive Museum – covered the collection.
