= Corwin Getaway =

Prototype American sports car

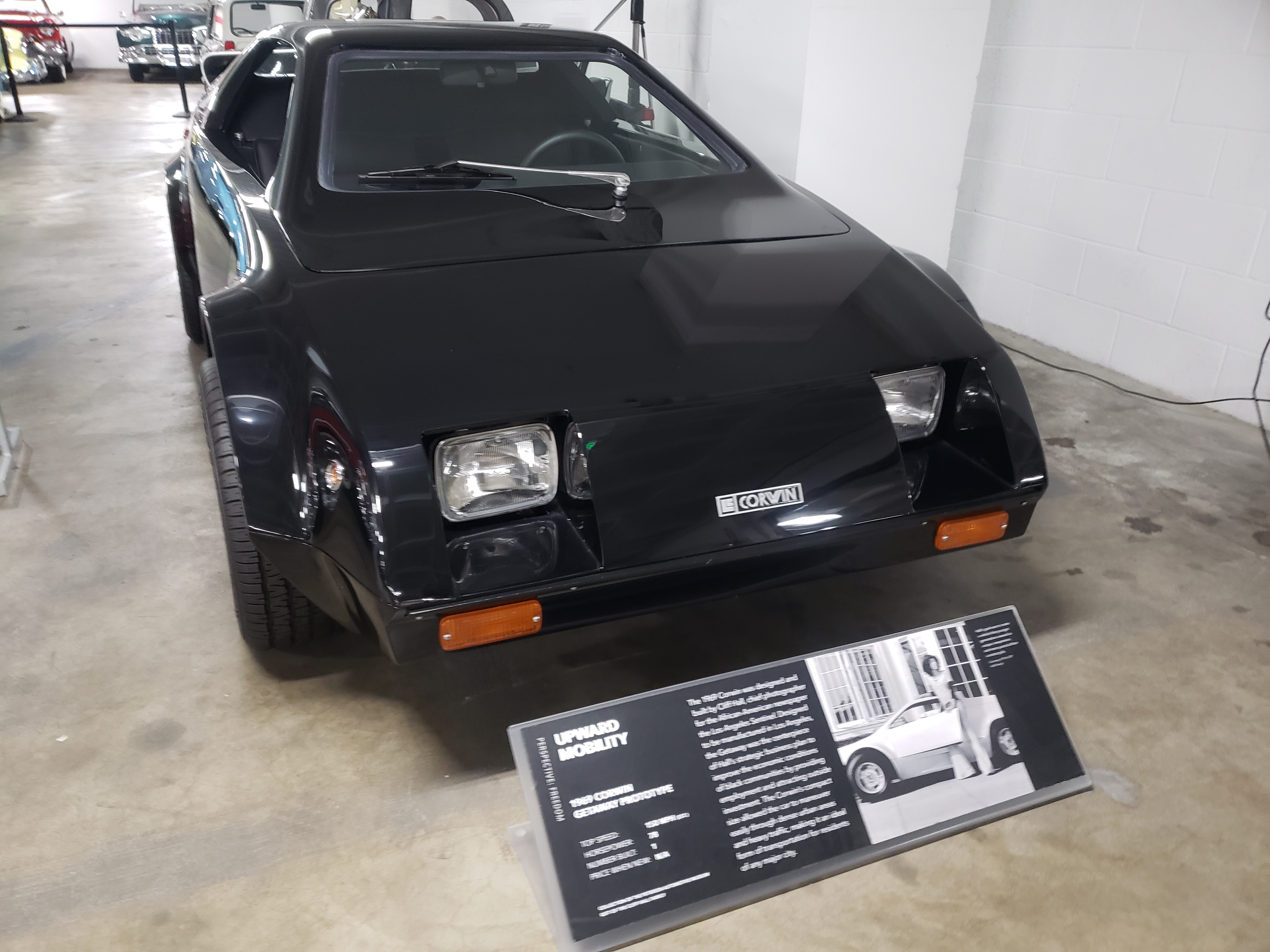

Overview
- Designer: Cliff Hall

Body and chassis
- Class: Sports car
- Body style: 2-door coupe
- Layout: M/R

Powertrain
- Engine: Subaru F4 boxer
- Transmission: Subaru 4-speed manual

Dimensions
- Length: 132 in (3,353 mm)
- Height: 43 in (1,092 mm)

The Corwin Getaway is a compact mid-engined sports car that was developed and built in Los Angeles, California in the mid to late 1960s. Only a single example survives. The Getaway was created by African-American photographer and designer Cliff Hall, who wanted it to serve as both an inexpensive, agile city car suited to Los Angeles driving conditions, and a source of reliable, well-paying jobs that would allow Black families in Los Angeles to build wealth.

== Development ==
I was going to be the Martin Luther King Jr. of industry.

— Cliff Hall

Hall began work on the Getaway shortly after the Watts Riots of 1965, and the prototype was completed in 1969.

Hall envisioned the Getaway as a car that would be "built by Black hands in a Black community". Production was planned for the Watts section of Los Angeles, to create skilled jobs for residents of that neighborhood. The production car was expected to sell for $4500.

Hall secured a total of $150,000 in funding to produce the prototype, $100,000 of which came from Beverly Hills businessman and Panasonic electronics importer Louis Corwin, for whom the car is named.

The finished prototype appeared at the 1970 Los Angeles Auto Show. The project received support from a variety of celebrities, including boxer Muhammad Ali, actor Sidney Poitier, and singer Marvin Gaye. While in discussions with Hall about the possibility of lending financial support, Gaye suggested naming the car the Corwin Panther. Ultimately, Hall was unable to secure enough financing to put the Getaway into production, and the car languished in storage at Hall's garage in Blair Hills for many years.

Hall loaned the car to the Petersen Automotive Museum for a show titled "Coachbuilt & Customs". Years later he donated the Getaway to the museum, where it is now part of their permanent collection. The museum used a crowd-funding drive to pay for the car's restoration, which was handled by Bodie Stroud Industries. The restoration was complete late in 2018, and the car went on display in 2019.

Even though he was unable to put the Getaway into full production, Hall continued to design innovative vehicles. Working with designer Dennis Huguley, he conceived of a narrow, two-passenger, three-wheeled "Magic Machine" that combined a motorcycle riding position with the look of an aircraft canopy and a hybrid gas/electric powertrain.

== Features ==
The Getaway was one of relatively few mid-engined cars of the era, preceded by some small-volume cars like the Porsche 550, Matra Djet, and ATS 2500 GT, and a contemporary of other models with a similar powertrain layout, including the De Tomaso Vallelunga, Lotus Europa, and Porsche 914.

Hall's original plan was for the Getaway to be powered by a motorcycle engine and transmission, which would be exposed at the rear of the car. The engineering challenges involved in using that type of powertrain, and the difficulty in providing a reverse gear, prompted a change. The prototype uses a four-cylinder Subaru boxer engine producing 78 hp (58.2 kW), mated to a 4-speed Subaru manual transmission.

The car's bodywork is made of fiberglass. The original body shape had round headlamps that protruded above the hood line and were blended in by wedge-shaped covers that tapered back into the hood. These were later replaced by rectangular headlamps and a smooth hood line. No side windows were fitted to the prototype.

== Revival ==
In 2021 it was announced that a revival of the Getaway was planned by the Italian bespoke constructor Giano Automobili, owned by Luigi De Falco. This updated version was to be powered by an electric motor, and built as a less expensive companion to Giano's supercharged V6 powered Ribot model.
