= Lamonte McLemore =

American vocalist (1935–2026)

- McLemore in 1971

Background information
- Born: Herman Lamonte McLemore; September 17, 1935; St. Louis, Missouri, U.S.
- Died: February 3, 2026 (aged 90) Las Vegas, Nevada, U.S.
- Genres: Pop music
- Occupations: Singer; actor
- Formerly of: The 5th Dimension

Herman Lamonte McLemore (September 17, 1935 – February 3, 2026) was an American bass vocalist, actor, composer and photographer. He was a founding member of The 5th Dimension, a popular vocal group of the late 1960s and early 1970s.

== Early life ==
Herman Lamonte McLemore was born in St. Louis, Missouri, on September 17, 1935.After graduating from Sumner High School in St. Louis, he joined the Navy where he trained as a photographer. McLemore pursued his passion for baseball following his discharge from the Navy, pitching in the Los Angeles Dodgers farm system until a broken arm ended his career.

== Photography ==
He co-founded Halmont Graphics with Cliff Hall, and worked there as a photographer beginning in 1958. McLemore was the first African American photographer hired by Harper's Bazaar magazine and was the photographer for Stevie Wonder's first album cover. He was a photographer for Jet and Ebony magazines for over 40 years. It was because of his photo shoot at the Miss Black Beauty Pageant in the mid-1960s that he met Marilyn McCoo and Florence LaRue, which ultimately led to The 5th Dimension being created.

He also worked as a professional photographer for Playboy and People magazines.

== Music ==
McLemore, a founding member of The 5th Dimension, started his music career in Los Angeles where formed the musical group The Versatiles with his friends Ronald Townson and Billy Davis Jr.. After photographing them in the Miss Bronze California beauty pageant, he asked Florence LaRue and Marilyn McCoo to join the group. Encouraged by his recording company, Soul City Records, the group changed their name to The 5th Dimension.

McLemore co-wrote two songs recorded by The 5th Dimension, "A Love Like Ours" (with Bob Alcivar) and "The Singer" (with Elliot Willensky).

== Personal life and death ==
McLemore married Lisa Harvey, and had a daughter named Ciara. In 2014, he wrote and published his autobiography with Robert-Allan Arno, From the Hobo Flats to The 5th Dimension – A Life Fulfilled in Baseball, Photography, and Music.

McLemore married Mieko Tone in 1995. He had two children, Ciara and Darin. He died at his home in Las Vegas on February 3, 2026, at the age of 90 after suffering a stroke.
