= Howard Bingham =

American photographer and businessman

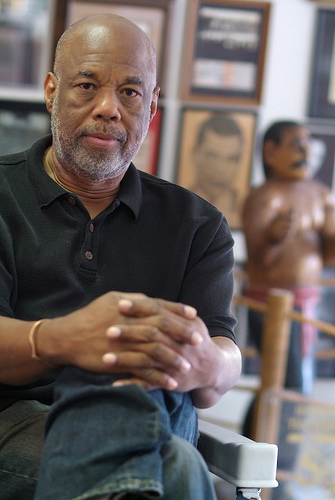
Bingham in 2005

Howard Leonid Bingham (May 29, 1939 – December 15, 2016) was a biographer of Muhammad Ali and a professional photographer.

Bingham was born in Jackson, Mississippi, the son of a minister and Pullman porter. After initially failing a photography course, he later began an apprenticeship at the Los Angeles Sentinel, working under the paper's long-time chief photographer Cliff Hall for eighteen months. While working there, he met the young Cassius Clay (later to become Muhammad Ali). The two had an instant rapport, one that led to a lifelong friendship. Bingham went on to create arguably the definitive book of photographs of Ali, Muhammad Ali: A Thirty-Year Journey.

Bingham was one of the first black photographers to work on a Hollywood International Cinematographers Guild camera crew. His photographs have been published in magazines and periodicals including: Life, Look, Time, Newsweek, Sports Illustrated, People, Ebony and others. He was selected as a photographer for the 1990 project Songs of My People.

Bingham was noted for interviewing James Earl Ray, the man who was convicted of the assassination of Martin Luther King Jr., as well as photographing the Black Panthers for LIFE at various points in his career. In 1997 Bingham was the recipient of the prestigious APS Award for Excellence. In 2006 Bingham was the recipient of the Gordon Parks Choice Of Weapon Award. In 2008 Bingham was honored by the Congressional Black Caucus with the Celebration of Leadership in Visual and Performing Arts Award.

In 2008 Bingham's work was on display at M+B Photo in an exhibit called "Howard L. Bingham: The Rumble In The Jungle". In 2015, Bingham's work was featured in an exhibit called "Light Catchers" at the California African American Museum along with six other prominent African-American photographers.
