= Petersen Automotive Museum =

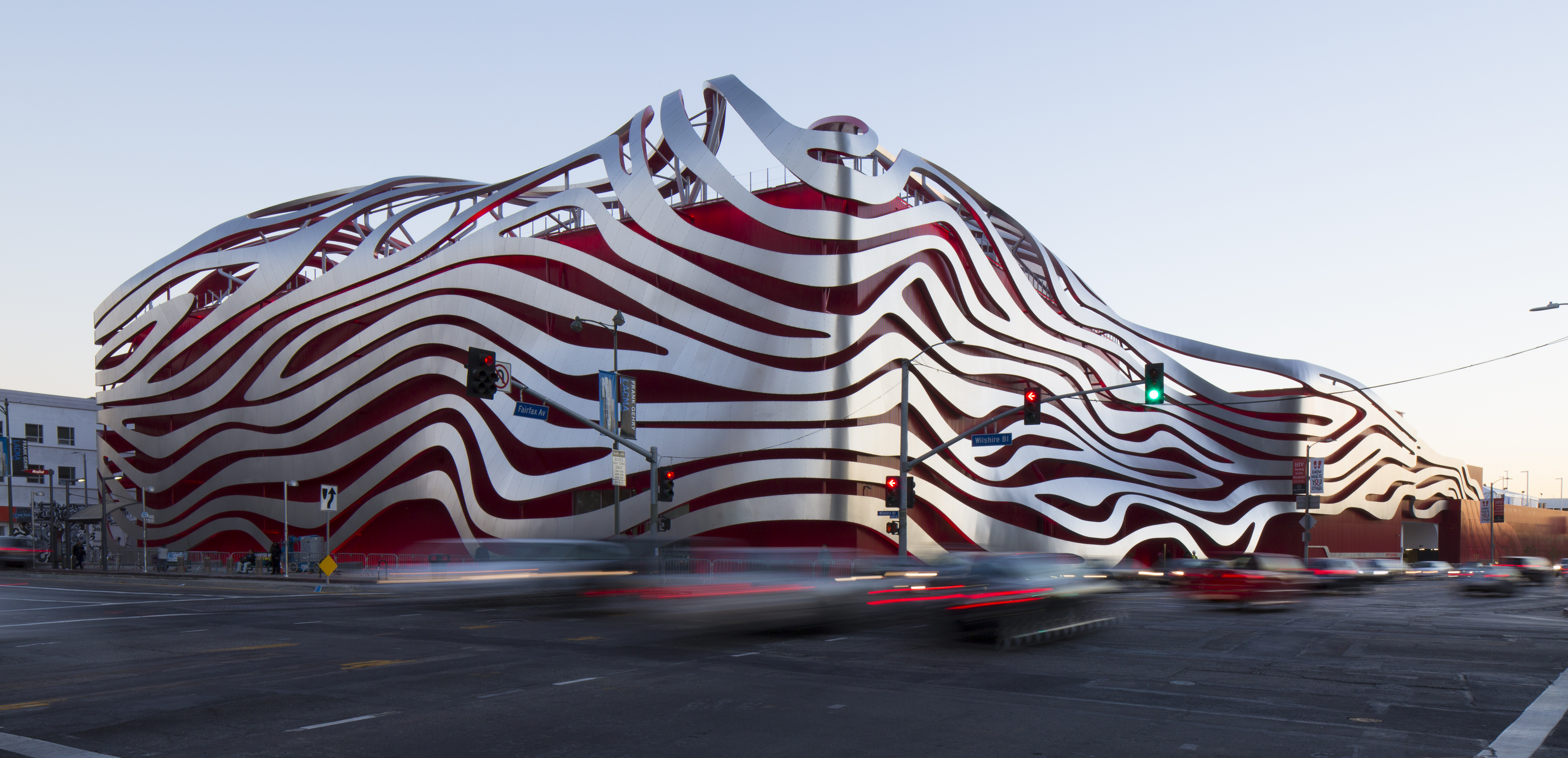
- Northwestern elevation, 2015
- Established: June 11, 1994; 32 years ago
- Location: 6060 Wilshire Boulevard; Los Angeles, California; United States
- Coordinates: 34.062472°N 118.361034°W
- Type: Automotive museum
- Director: Terry L. Karges
- Curator: Leslie Kendall
- Website: www.petersen.org

The Petersen Automotive Museum is an automobile museum located on Wilshire Boulevard along Museum Row in the Miracle Mile neighborhood of Los Angeles. One of the world's largest collections, the Petersen Automotive Museum is a nonprofit organization specializing in automobile history and related educational programs.

== History ==
Founded on June 11, 1994, by magazine publisher Robert E. Petersen and his wife Margie, the $40-million Petersen Automotive Museum is owned and operated by the Petersen Automotive Museum Foundation. The museum was originally located within the Natural History Museum of Los Angeles County, and later moved to a historic department store designed by Welton Becket. Opened in 1962, the building first served as a short-lived U.S. branch of Seibu Department Stores, before operating as an Ohrbach's department store from 1965 to 1986. Six years after Ohrbach's closed, Robert Petersen selected the largely windowless site as an ideal space for a museum, allowing artifacts to be displayed without harmful exposure to direct sunlight.

On March 9, 1997, rapper the Notorious B.I.G. was murdered just outside the building in a drive-by shooting, after having attended a party at the museum.

In 2014 and 2015, the museum underwent an extensive $125 million renovation. The building's façade was redesigned by the architectural firm Kohn Pedersen Fox, and features a stainless-steel ribbon assembly made of 100 tons of 14-gauge type 304 steel in 308 sections, 25 supports and 140,000 custom stainless-steel screws. Designers at The Scenic Route worked with museum planner, Matt Kirchman of ObjectIDEA Planning and Design, to configure interior spaces to accommodate new themes and changing exhibits. The remodeled museum opened to the public on December 7, 2015.

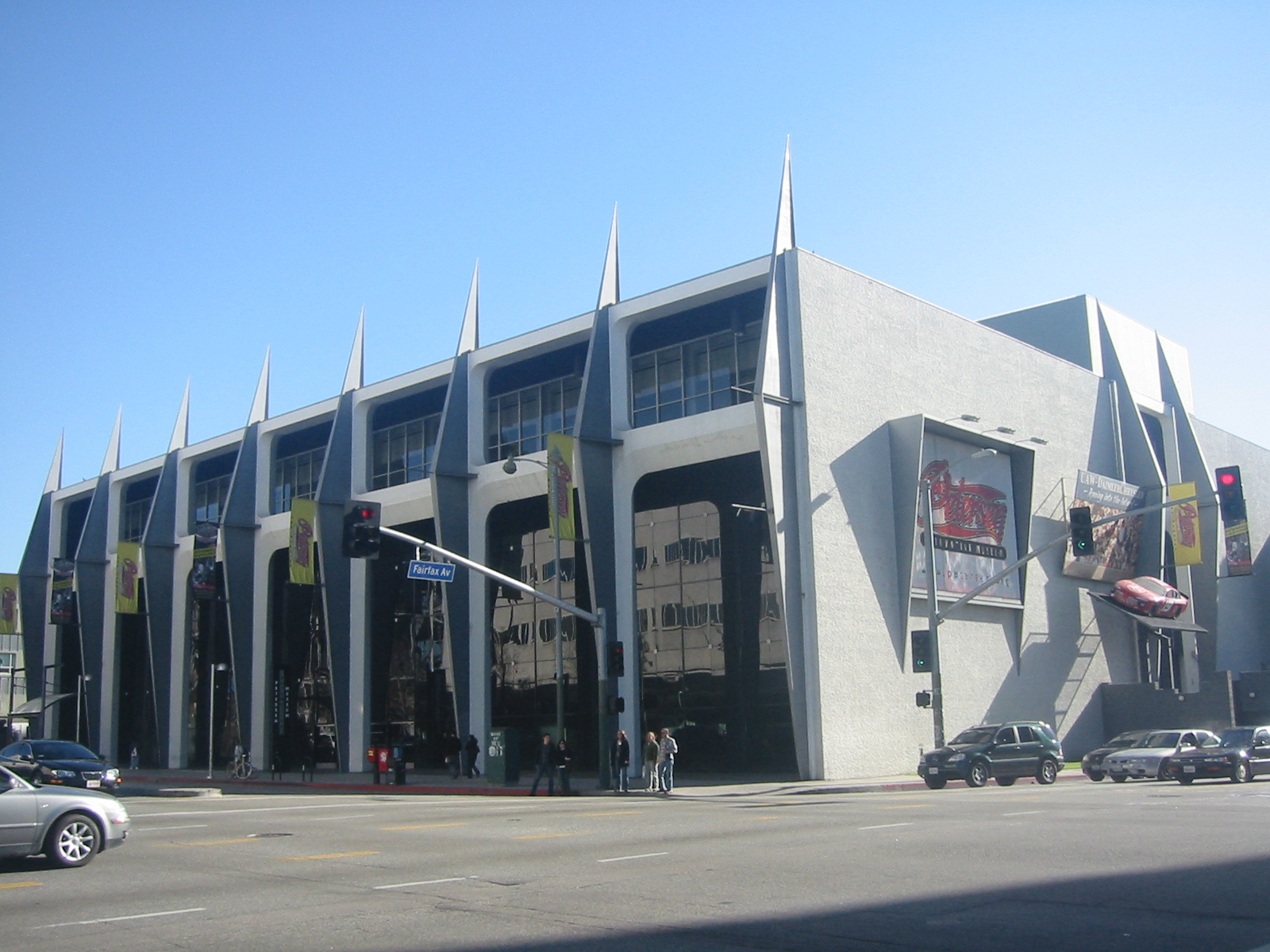
Museum before its 2015 renovation

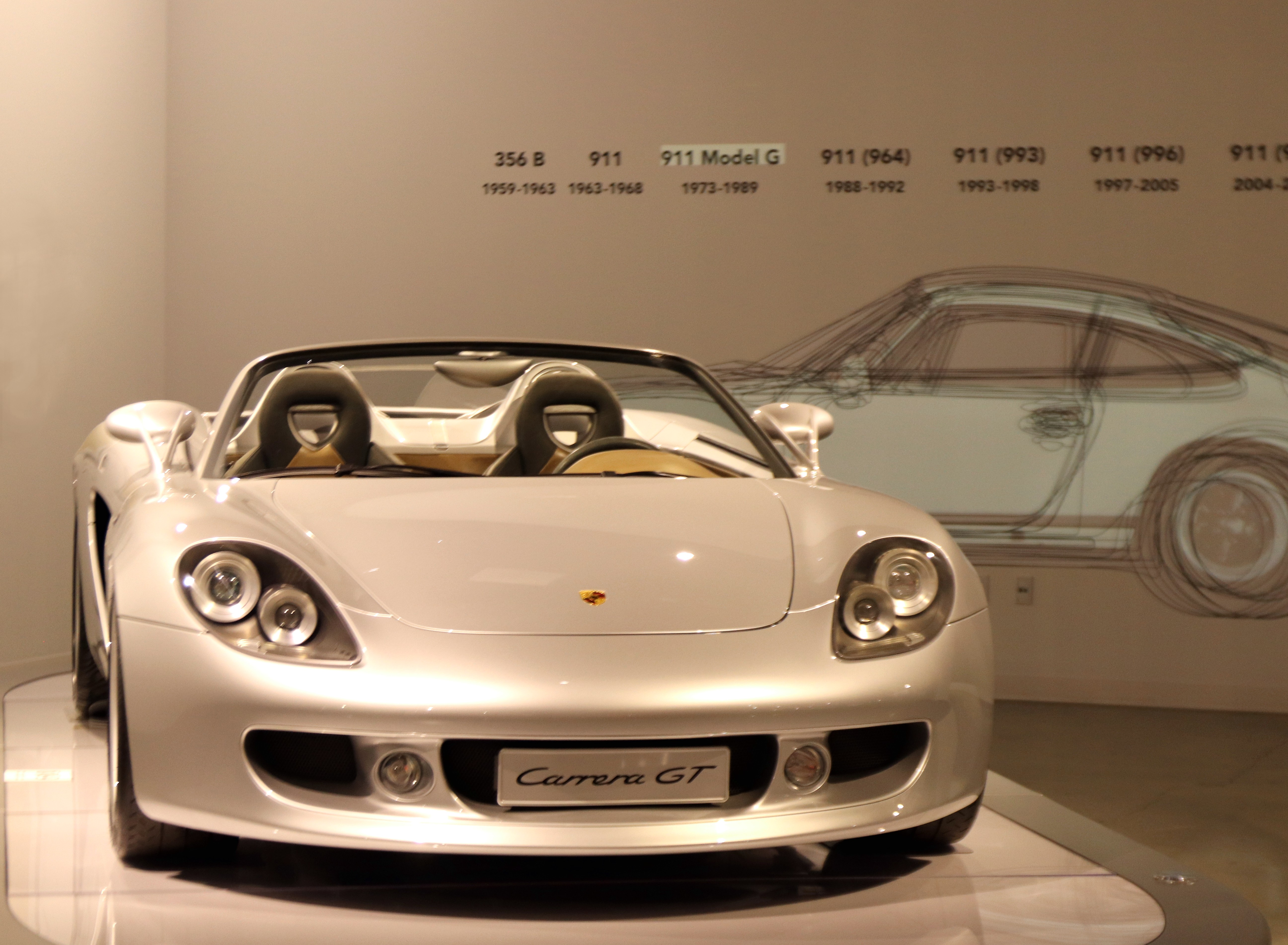
Porsche Carrera GT concept at the museum

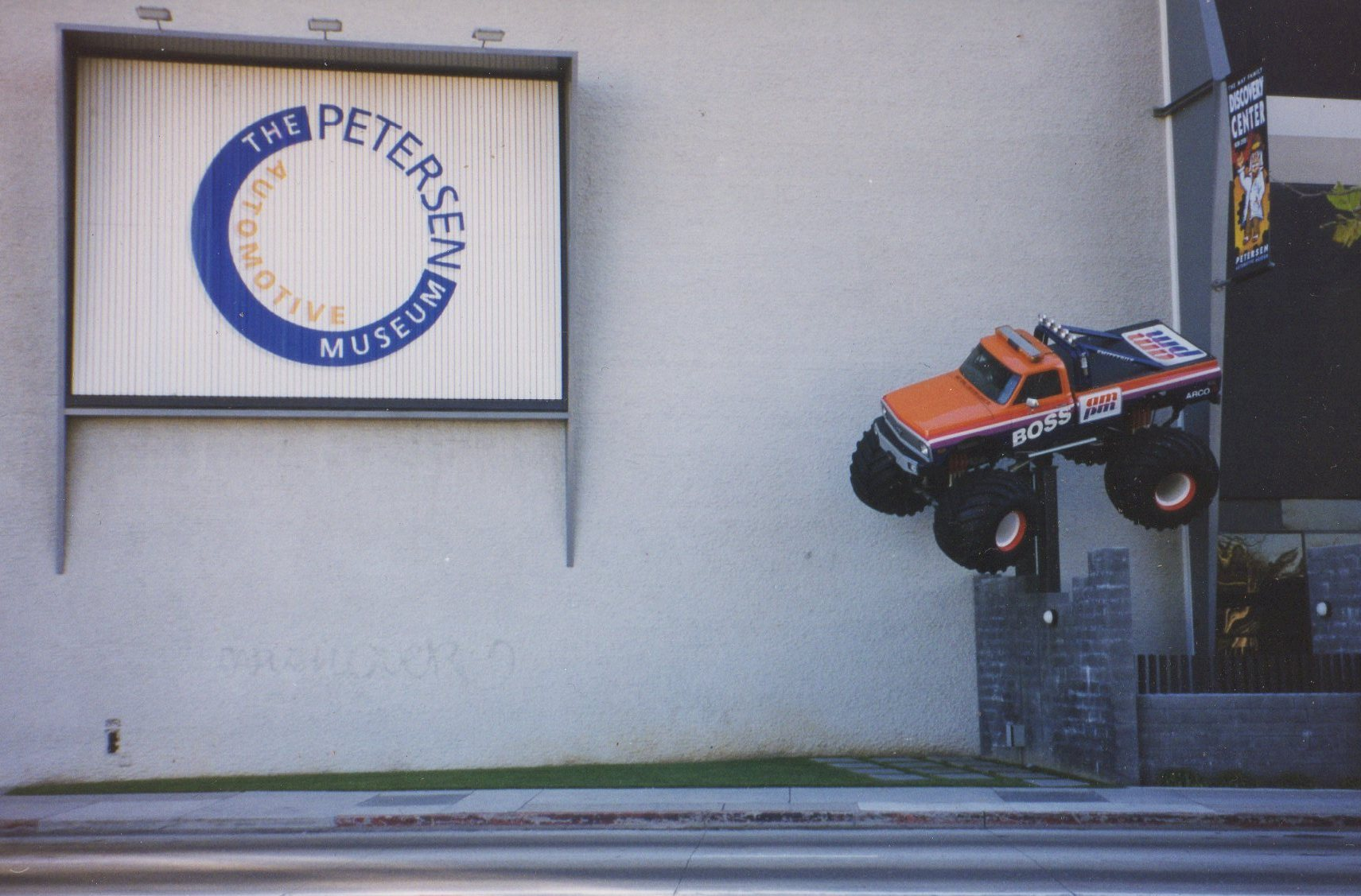
Classic Boss Ampm Monster Truck hanging from the wall, at museum display, before renovation

== Exhibits and collection ==
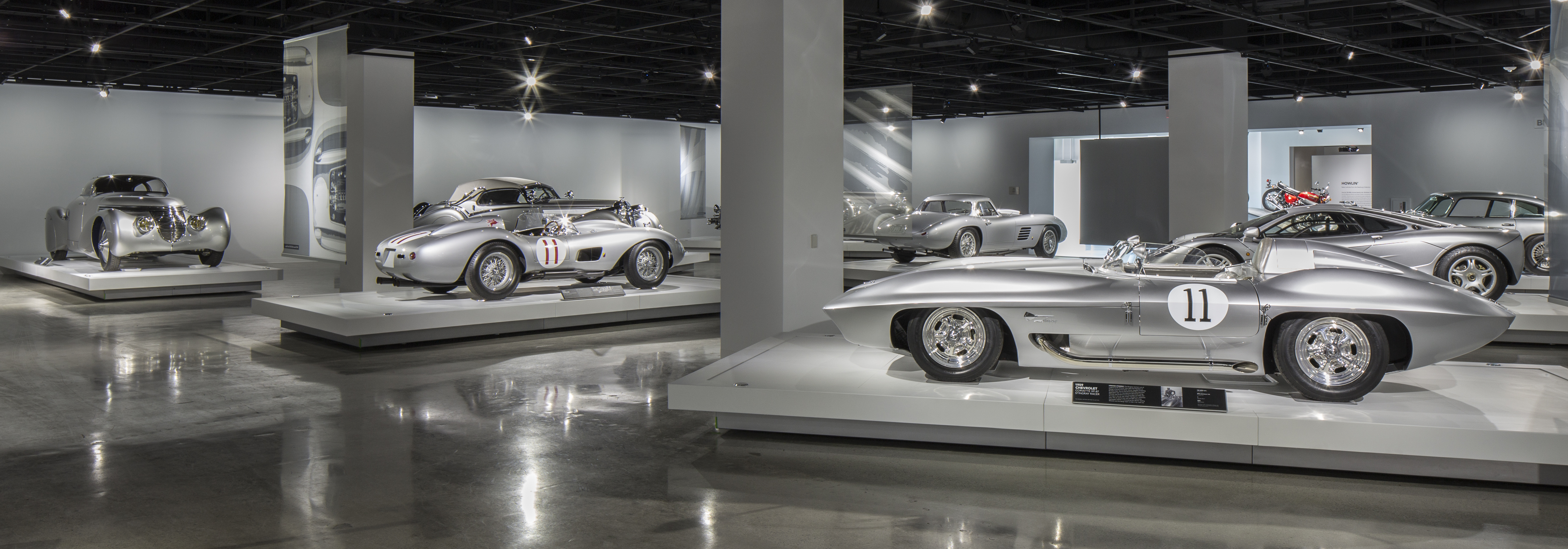
Precious Metal exhibit, 2015

The museum has over 100 vehicles on display in its 25 galleries. The remaining half is kept in a vault on the building's basement level. Age restrictions and an admission premium are in effect to view the vault collection. The ground floor focuses on automotive artistry, showcasing an array of extravagant automobiles. The second floor is principally concerned with industrial engineering—including design, performance, and a collection of interactive teaching exhibits. Special displays on the industry floor cover racing, motorcycles, hot rods, and customs. The third floor chronicles the history of the automobile, with an emphasis on the car culture of Southern California.

=== Exhibits ===
Some of the museum's exhibits have included:

- An extensive Porsche exhibit (until January 2019), including one of only two 1939 Porsche 64s in existence.
- An exhibit on the history of the Japanese automotive industry, with many cars on view from Japanese collections
- An exhibit on powered children's racecars
- A year-long exhibit to mark the 75th anniversary of carmaker Porsche.
- An extensive Tesla Motors exhibit on display from 2022 to 2024 that featured numerous vehicles manufactured by Tesla, as well as many other non-vehicle items, such as space suits worn by NASA astronauts Doug Hurley and Bob Behnken, the first NASA astronauts sent into space aboard a rocket and capsule made by SpaceX.

=== Collection ===
The museum's collection of vehicles includes:

- The 1963 "NASCAR Herbie" Volkswagen Beetle used during filming of Herbie: Fully Loaded
- A life-sized model of Lightning McQueen from Cars franchise
- A 1964 Chevrolet Impala lowrider owned by Jesse Valadez known as Gypsy Rose
- A 1967 Ford GT40 Mk III
- A 1956 Jaguar XKSS formerly owned by Steve McQueen
- A 1958 Plymouth Belvedere from Christine
- A 1989 Batmobile from Batman and Batman Returns
- A 2001 Honda S2000 used in 2 Fast 2 Furious
- A 2001 Jaguar XKR from Die Another Day
- A Ferrari 308 GTSi used by Tom Selleck in Magnum, P.I.
- A De Tomaso Pantera which belonged to Elvis Presley
- The original primary camera-ready “hero” DeLorean time machine from Back to the Future
- Luke Skywalker's landspeeder from Star Wars
- The Plymouth XNR replica built by Gotham Garage on Car Masters: Rust to Riches
- The Corwin Getaway, a compact mid-engined car designed by photographer Cliff Hall that debuted at the 1970 LA Auto Show.
- A 1998 Cadillac Popemobile.
- A 1978 Mercedes-Benz 600 Landaulet used by Saddam Hussein.
- An armored 1984 Mercedes-Benz 500SEL used to transport Ferdinand Marcos during his rule.
- A Lotus 99T driven by Ayrton Senna
- A McLaren MCL33 driven by Fernando Alonso

== Finances ==
The museum received a $100 million gift from Margie Petersen and the Margie & Robert E. Petersen Foundation in April 2011. This gift included cash, the property the museum was leasing, as well as many vehicles belonging to the Petersens.
