= Mark Towle =

Auto customizer

- Known for: Automobile and motorcycle customizing, hot rod art and pinstriping
- Notable work: Plymouth XNR replica at the Petersen Automotive Museum; Speed Racer Mach Five replica at the Petersen Automotive Museum; Lincoln Futura replica
- Website: www.gothamgarage.com

Mark Towle (born 1962) is an American car mechanic. A car and motorcycle restorer and automotive designer, he is best known as the owner of a car restoration and makeover business, Gotham Garage based in Temecula, California. The shop has built props for movie studios and television shows. In 2018, Netflix released Car Masters: Rust to Riches, which features Towle and his Gotham Garage team.

Earlier in 2015, Towle became a defendant in a copyright infringement case filed and subsequently won by DC Comics regarding Towle's replication and sale of Batmobiles.

Towle's and his Gotham Garage crew's 1:1 replica of the Plymouth XNR is displayed at the Petersen Automotive Museum in Los Angeles. Other notable Gotham Garage rebuilds include the Lincoln Futura that Towle's team sold at the 2018 Grand National Roadster Show (held at the Pomona Fairplex), shown in season 1 of Car Masters: Rust to Riches.
