= Horch 850 =

Horch 850/851/853/853A/855/951/951A
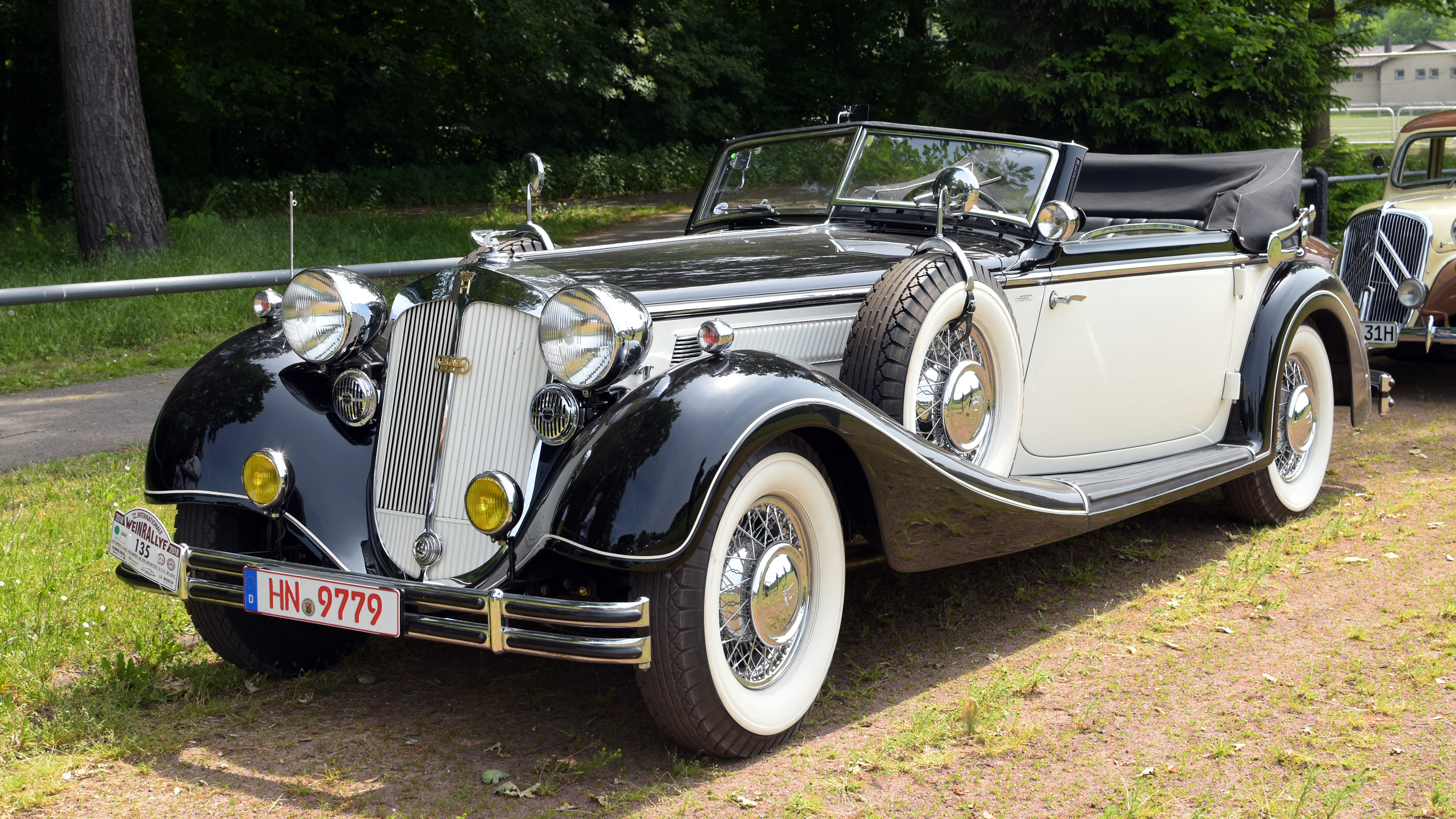
- 1937 Horch 853 Sport Cabriolet

Overview
- Manufacturer: Horch
- Production: 1935–1940; 2,200 produced
- Assembly: Zwickau, Germany

Body and chassis
- Class: Full-size luxury car (F)
- Body style: 4-door cabriolet 2-door cabriolet 4-door saloon
- Layout: FR layout

Powertrain
- Engine: 4,944 cc Typ 850 I8
- Transmission: 4-speed manual /optional overdrive

Dimensions
- Wheelbase: 853/853A/855: 3,300 mm (129.9 in); 850/850S/853/853A: 3,450 mm (135.8 in); 850/851/951/951A: 3,750 mm (147.6 in)

Chronology
- Predecessor: Horch 8

Horch 850 is a luxury passenger car produced by the German marque Horch (part of Auto Union AG) from 1935 to 1940. It succeeded the earlier Horch 8 series as well as the twelve-cylinder 600/670 as Horch's top model. It was positioned as a high-end vehicle aimed at wealthy clientele, government officials, and diplomats. The model featured a powerful 5.0-liter inline-eight petrol engine and was offered in various body styles, including Pullman limousines, convertibles, and sportier variants. Approximately 2,200 units of all variants were built at the Horch plant in Zwickau before production ended due to World War II.

== History ==
Horch introduced the 850 in 1935 as a larger, more expensive complement to the V8-powered 830 series. The car was developed under Auto Union, which had merged Horch with Audi, DKW, and Wanderer in 1932. Early models produced 100 PS (74 kW), while from 1937 onward, engine output was increased to 120 PS (88 kW) through camshaft modifications and a higher compression ratio. In 1937, the lineup expanded with the 851 (luxury Pullman versions with added features such as a retractable partition and double shock absorbers) and the shorter-wheelbase 853 Sport convertible. The 951 and 951A (introduced in 1937–1938) featured a longer body, De Dion rear axle, and standard overdrive. Sport models like the 853A and rare 855 roadster were produced in limited numbers until 1939, when wartime restrictions curtailed civilian production.

=== Design ===
All Horch 850 series models shared a common powertrain based on a 4,944 cc (302 cu in) straight-eight engine with ten main bearings and an overhead camshaft (OHC), driven by a vertical shaft from the crankshaft. The engine had a bore of 87 mm (3.43 in) and a stroke of 104 mm (4.09 in). Early versions ran at 5.8:1 compression; later ones used 6.1:1. Power was transmitted via a four-speed manual gearbox with a central shift lever and an optional, 0.714 ratio overdrive ("Autobahn-Ferngang"). The overdrive became standard fitment on the 853A in 1938. The electrical system operated at 12 volts.

The chassis consisted of a ladder frame with box-section side rails and X-shaped reinforcements. Suspension used an independent front setup with transverse leaf springs and a rigid rear axle with semi-elliptic springs (De Dion axle on some later sport and 951 models). Brakes were hydraulic drums with vacuum servo assistance. Fuel capacity was 95 liters, with average consumption around 22–23 L/100 km.

=== Production ===
Total production reached approximately 2,200 units:

- Pullman limousines and convertibles (850/851/951 series): ~1,186 units
- Sport convertibles and roadsters (853/853 A/855): ~1,023 units (including ~10–15% with custom coachwork)

Body codes included PL4 (4-door Pullman limousine), PC4 (Pullman convertible), Cb2/Cb4 (convertibles), T6 (6-seat touring car), and R2 (roadster). Horch limited themselves to producing mainly limousine (saloon) and convertible bodywork of a somewhat staid design as in-house bodies. More rakish and sportier body designs were entrusted to various independent coachbuilders, primarily Gläser but also Erdmann & Rossi and others. Notable examples include the 1937 Bernd Rosemeyer "Manuela" coupé by Erdmann & Rossi.

Surviving examples are highly prized by collectors and frequently appear at Concours d'Elegance events. The model symbolized Auto Union's engineering skill before the war and influenced later Audi branding (Horch's four-ring logo was later adopted by the modern Audi company). A small number of Horch 850s are preserved in museums, including the EFA-Museum für Deutsche Automobilgeschichte in Germany.

=== Gallery (factory bodies) ===
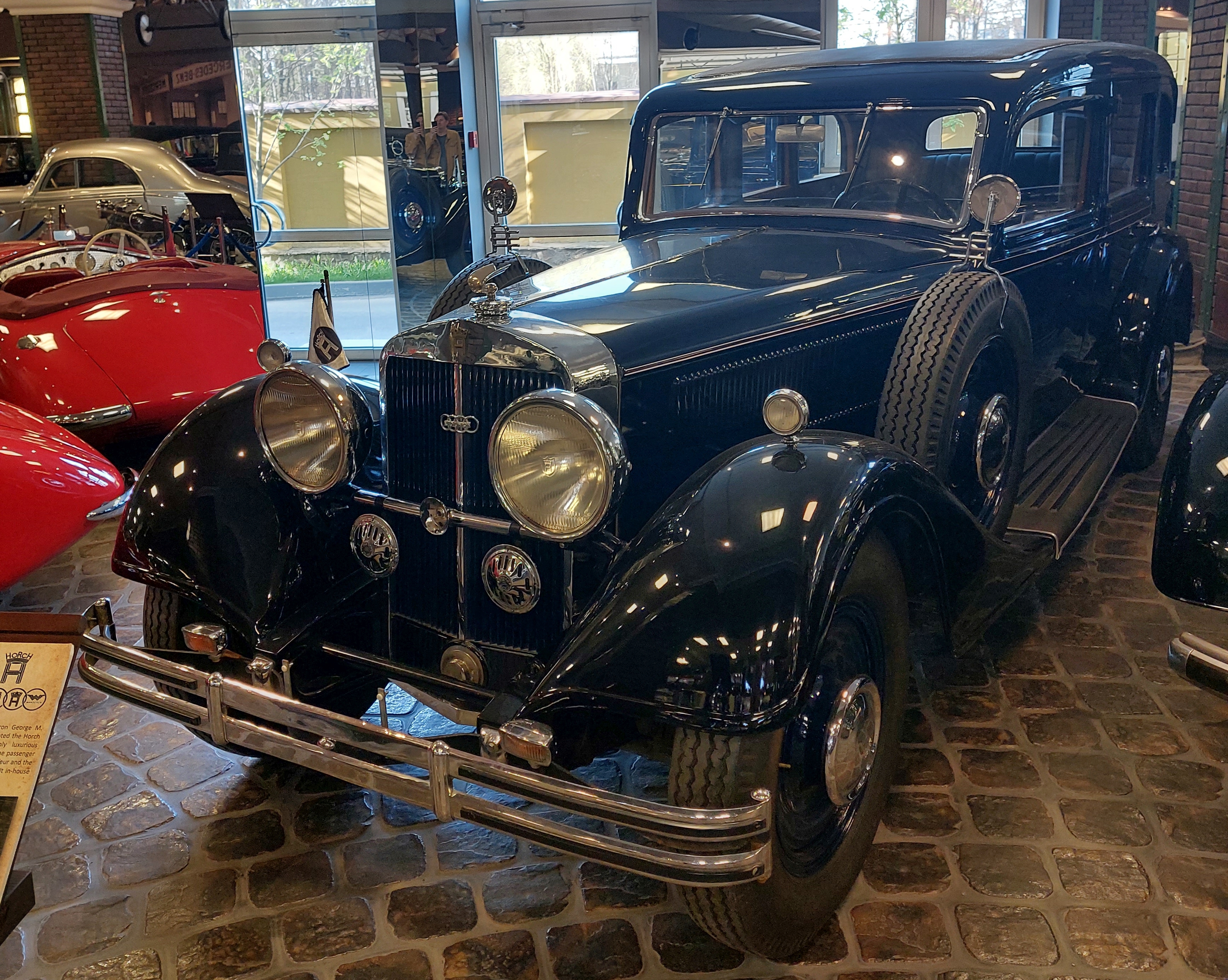
Horch 850-51 Pullman

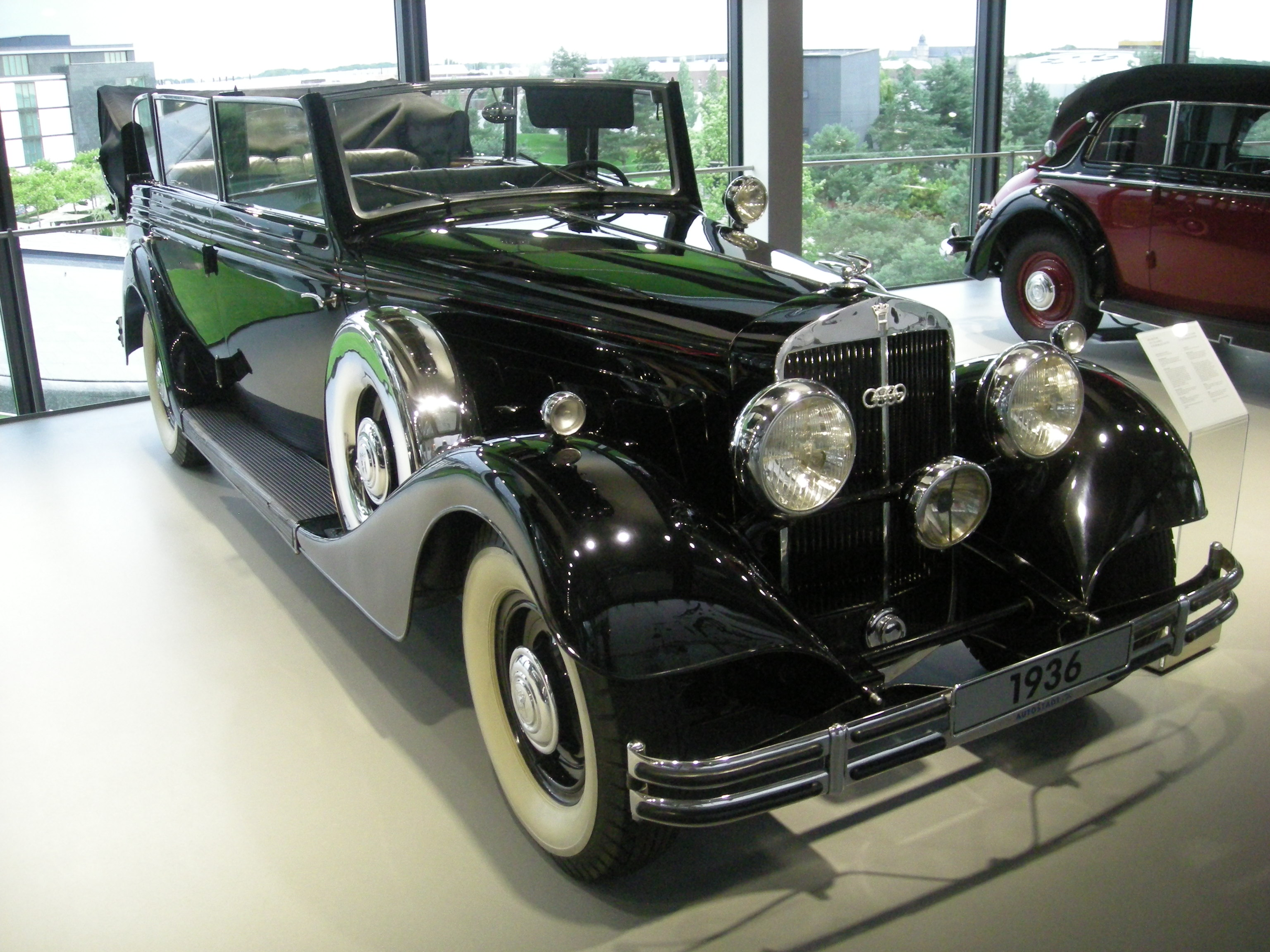
1936 Horch 851

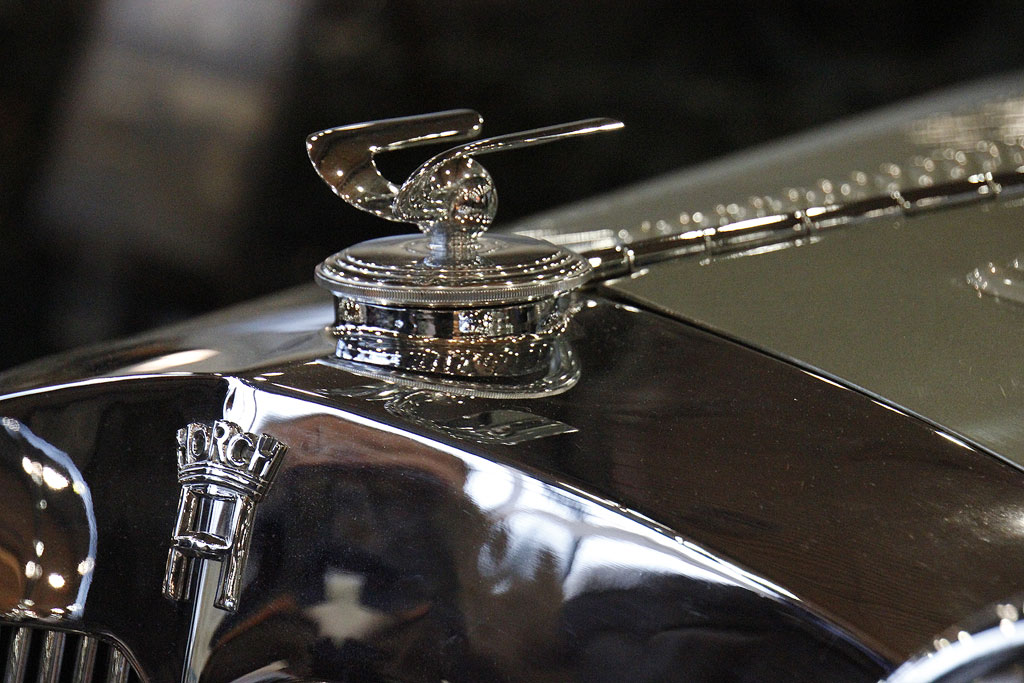
Horch 853 hood ornament

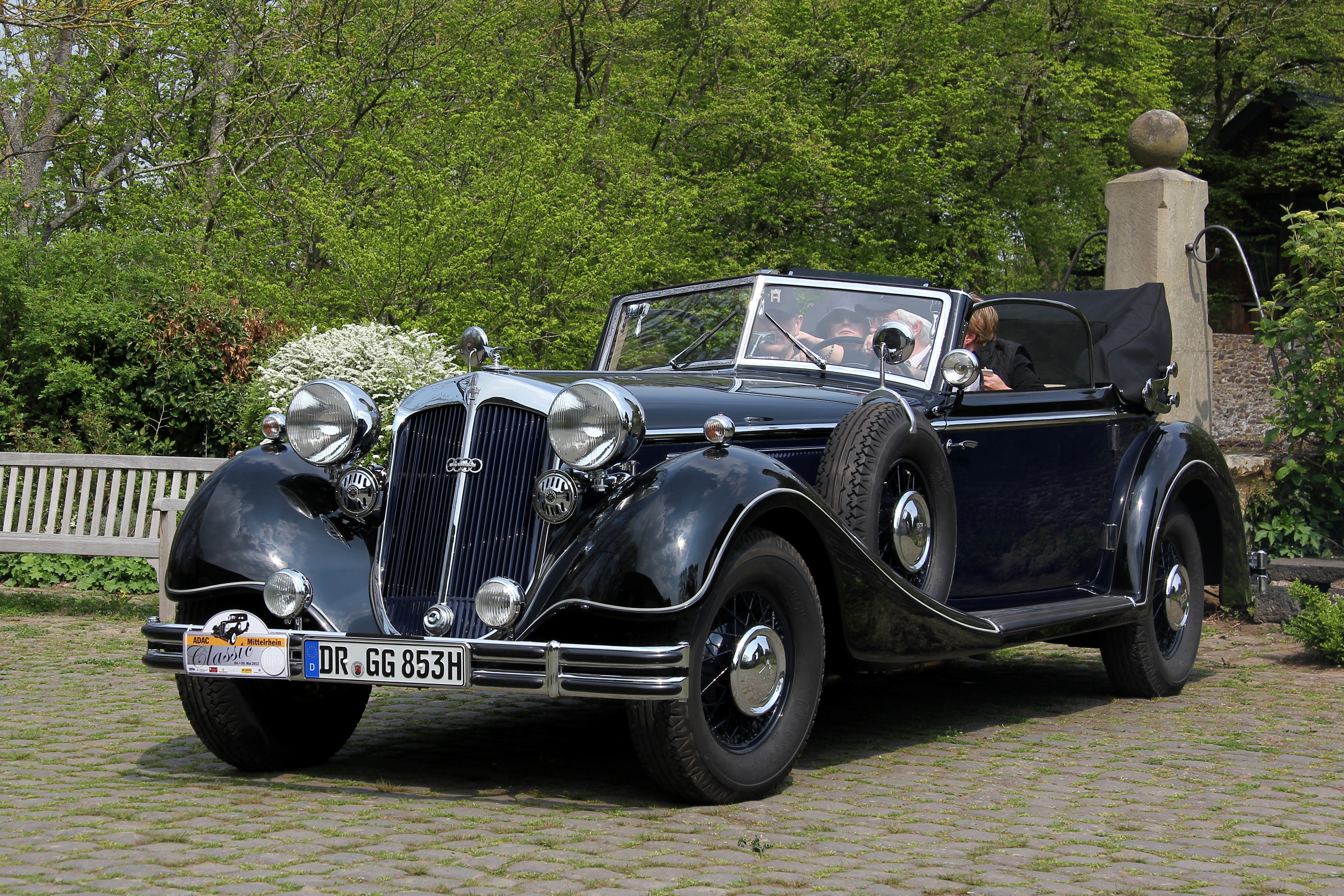
1936 Horch 853

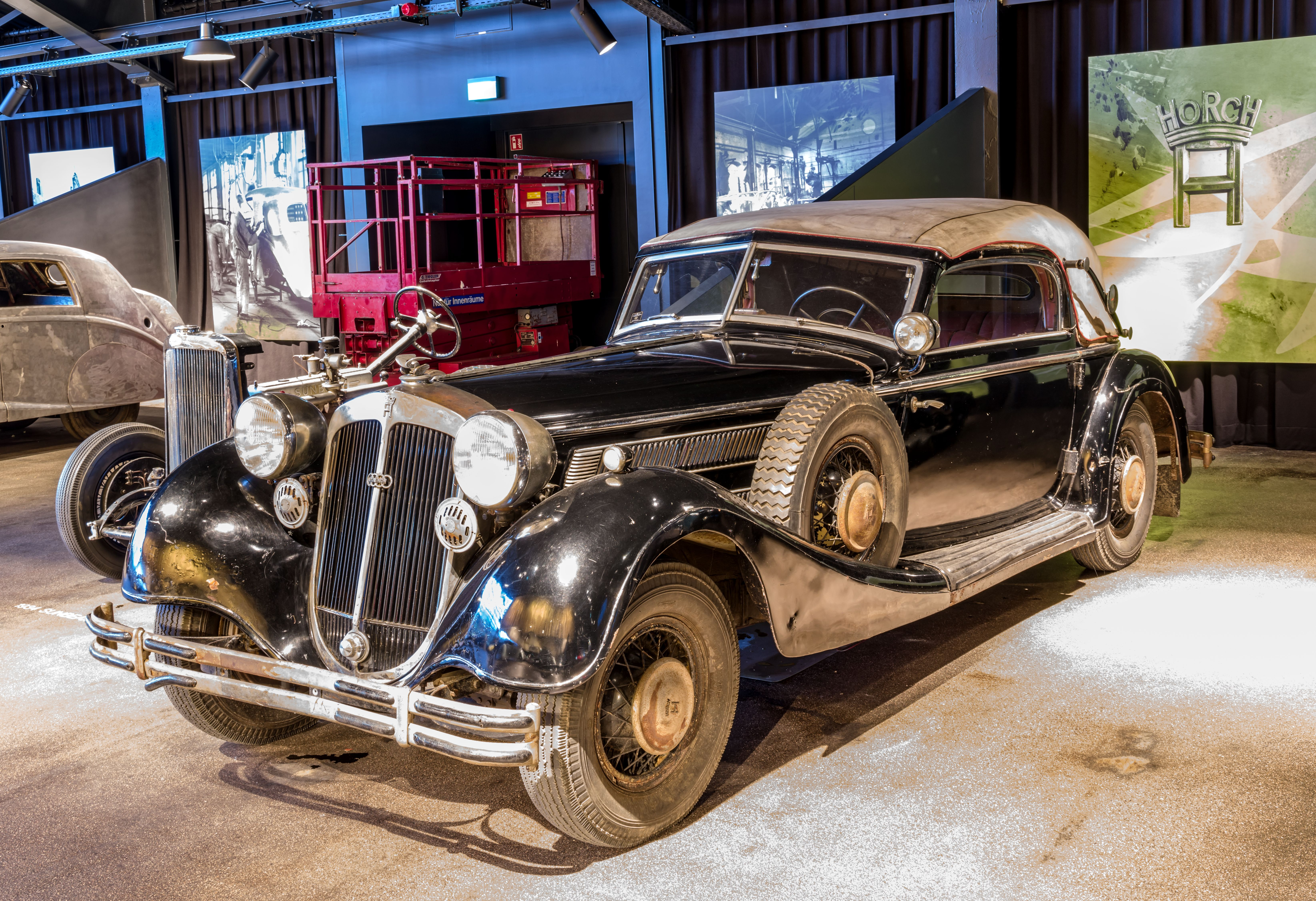
1937 Horch 853 Sport

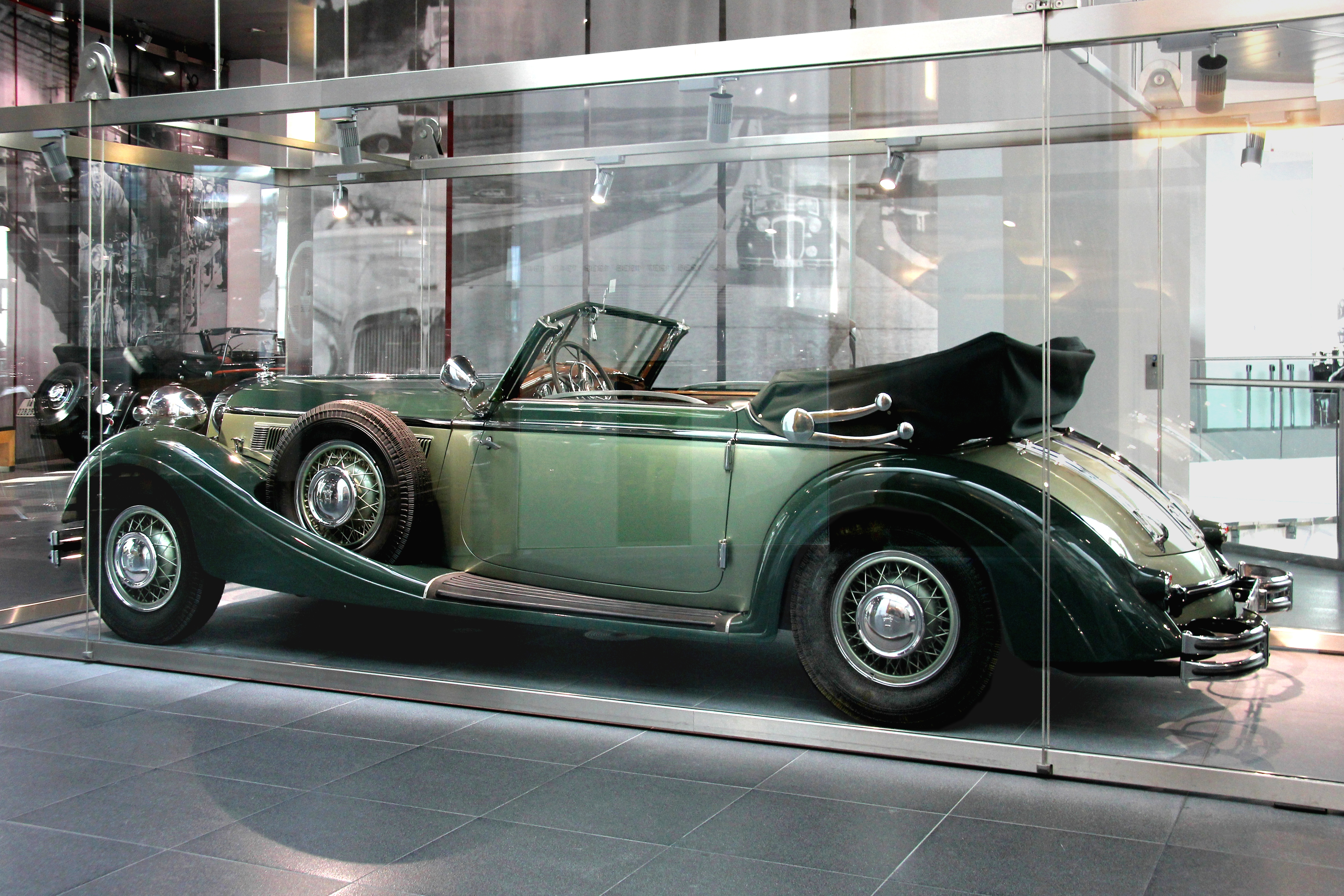
1937 Horch 853 Sport Cabriolet

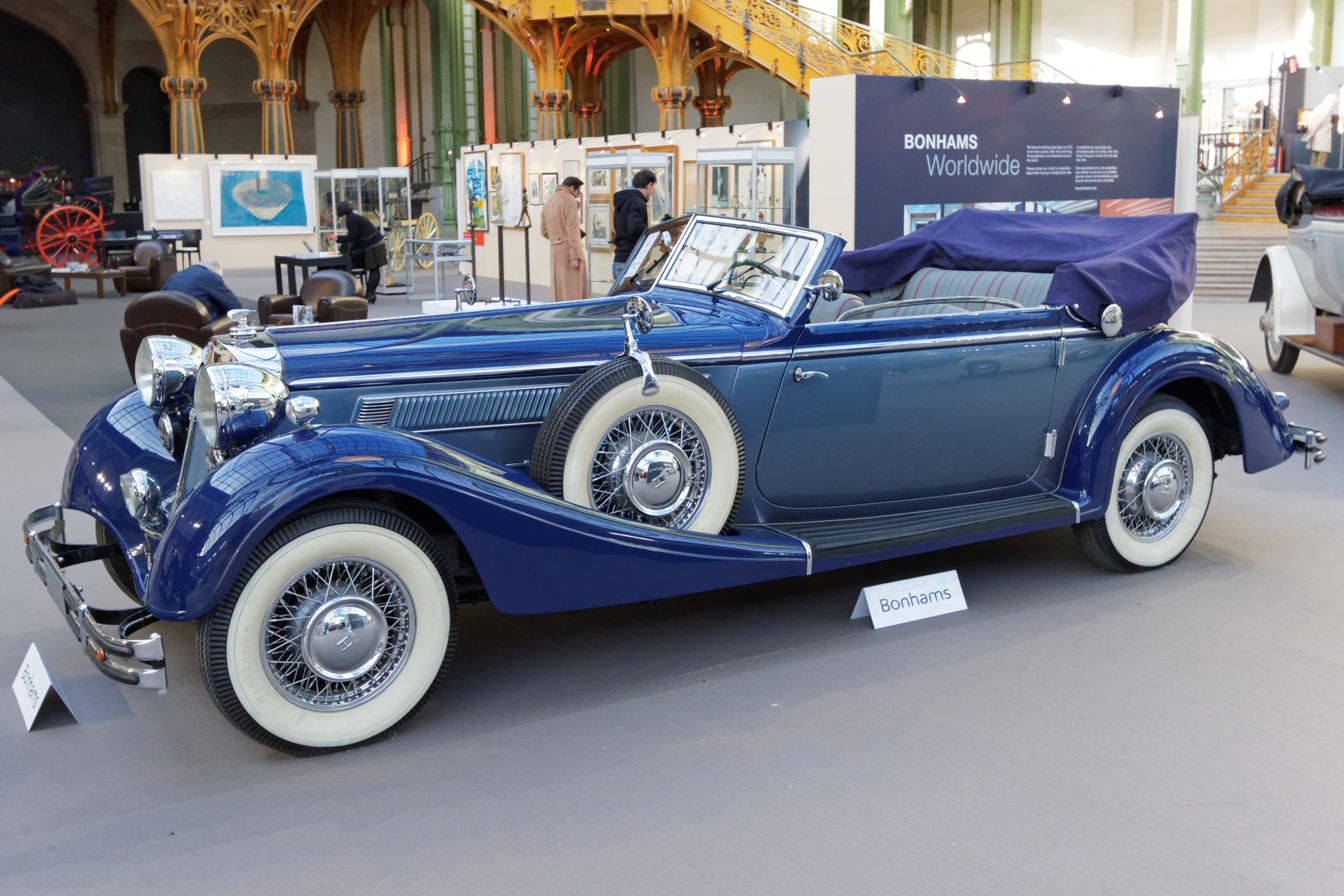
1938 Horch 853 cabriolet (chassis 853 400)

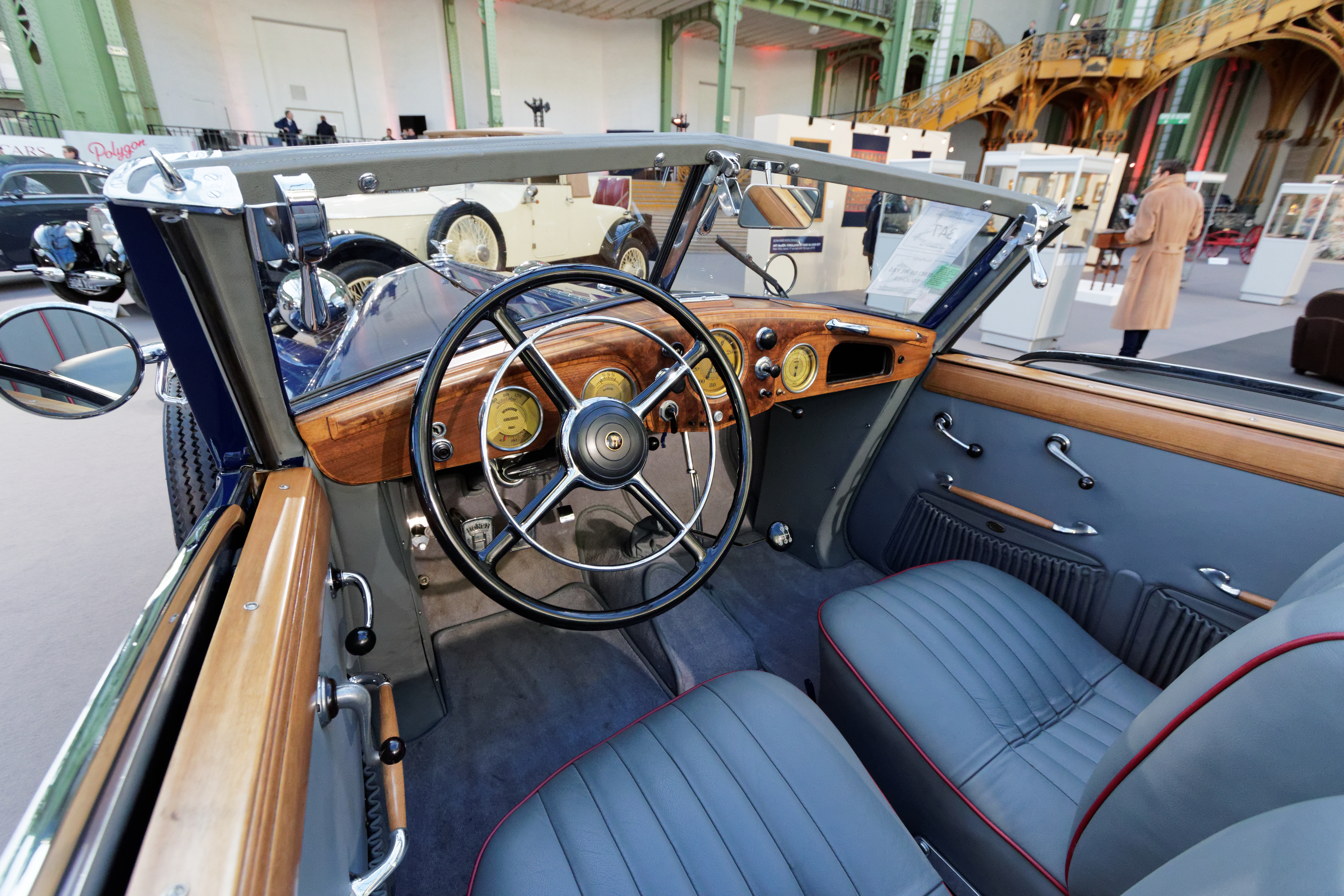
1938 Horch 853 cabriolet (chassis 853 400)

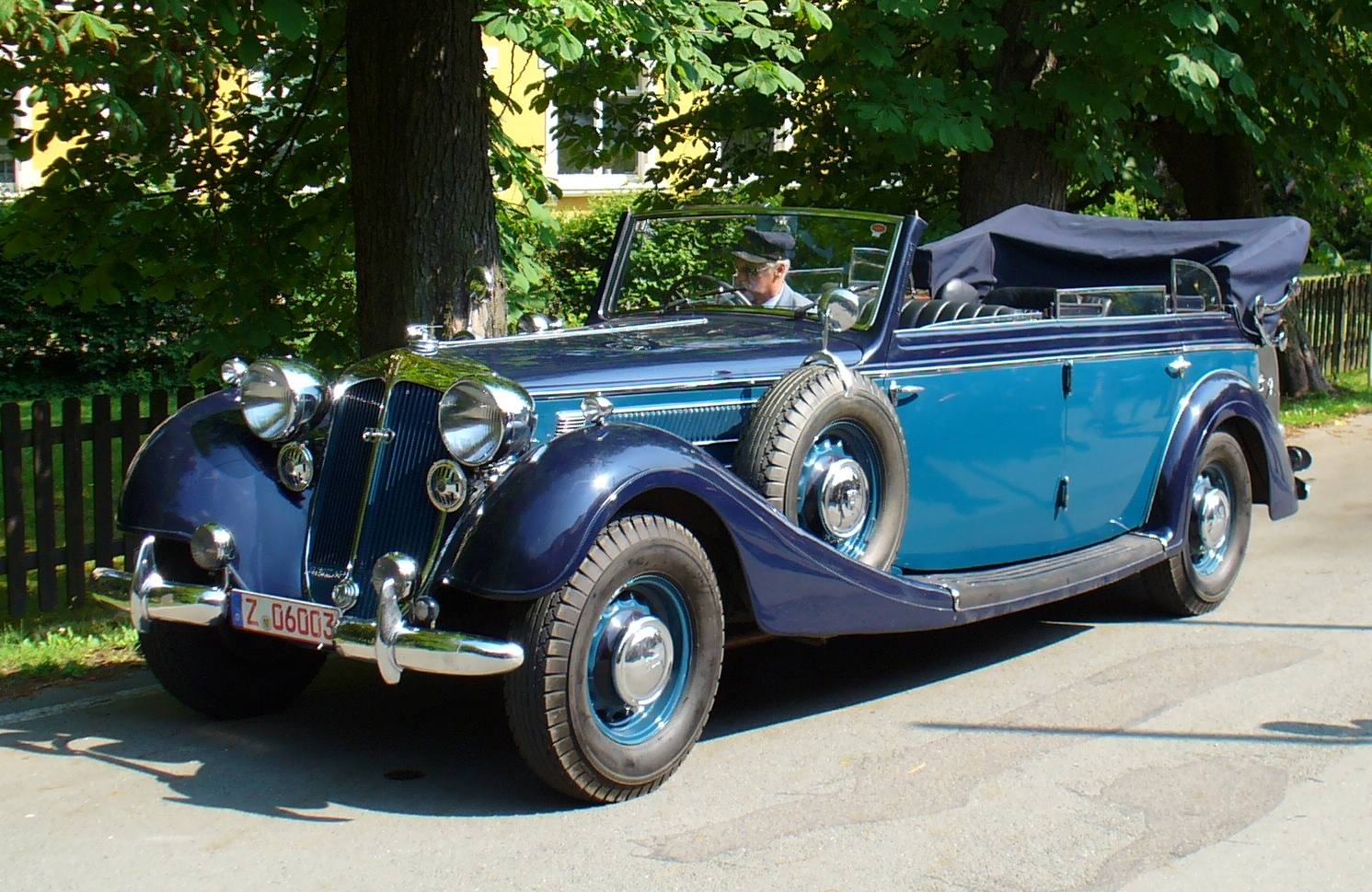
1937 Horch 951 A Pullman Cabriolet

== Special coachwork ==
The Horch 853 Voll & Ruhrbeck Sport Cabriolet is a cabriolet bodied by Voll & Ruhrbeck in 1937. It was not the first special-bodied, sporting Horch, being preceded by the Reinbolt & Christe-bodied Horch 710 Spezial Roadster amongst others. It was fitted with the 120 PS (88 kW) straight-eight engine and the 4-speed manual transmission.

The history of the car remains a mystery. During the war, the Allied bombers destroyed the Voll & Ruhrbeck plant, and along with it the Horch 853 documentation. The car was captured by the French government and fell into the hands of French army Marshal Jean de Lattre de Tassigny. In the post-war period, the car was moved to Switzerland, after which it changed owners multiple times and was restored.

=== Gallery (Special bodies) ===
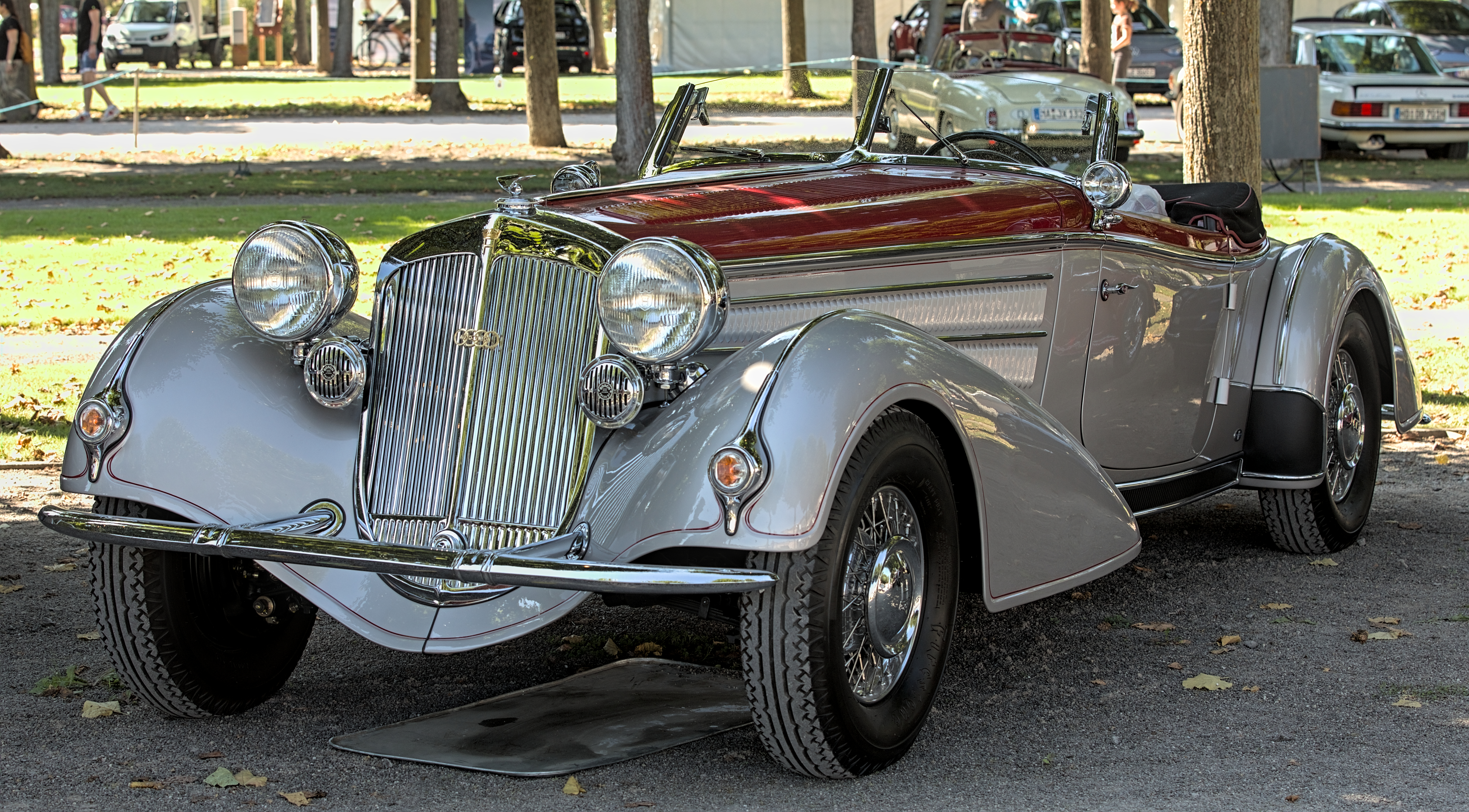
1936 Horch 853 Spezial Roadster

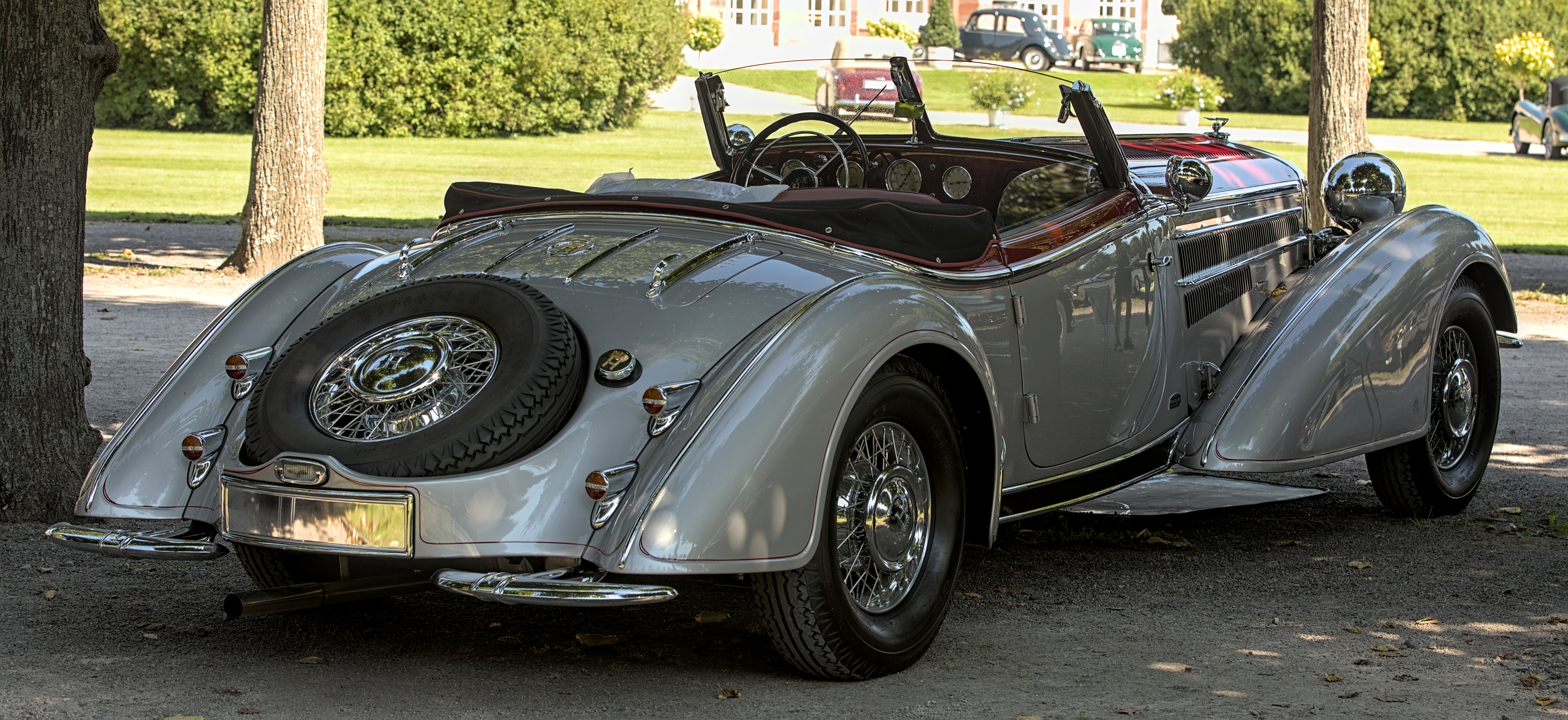
1936 Horch 853 Spezial Roadster

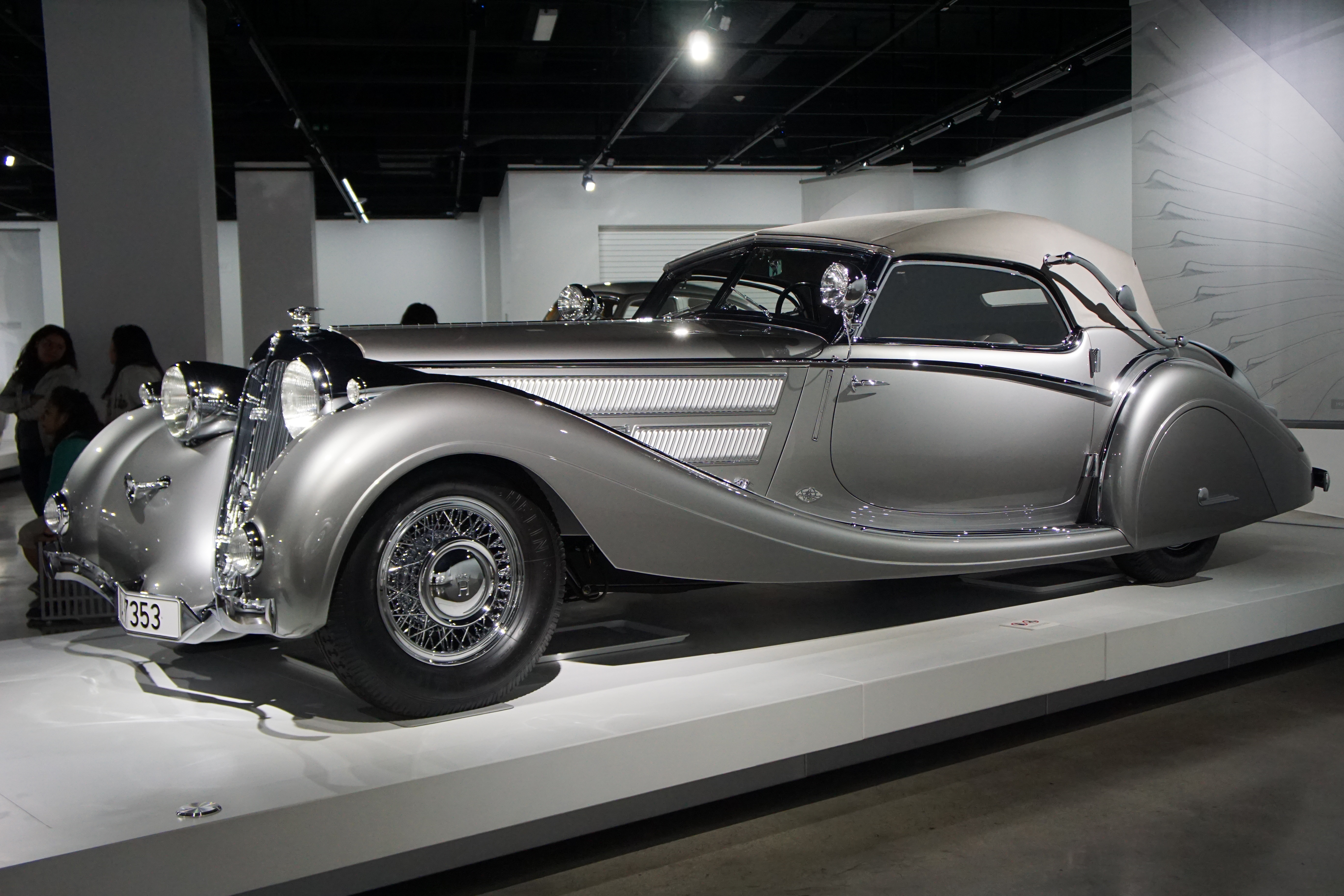
Horch 853 Voll & Ruhrbeck Sport Cabriolet, front side view

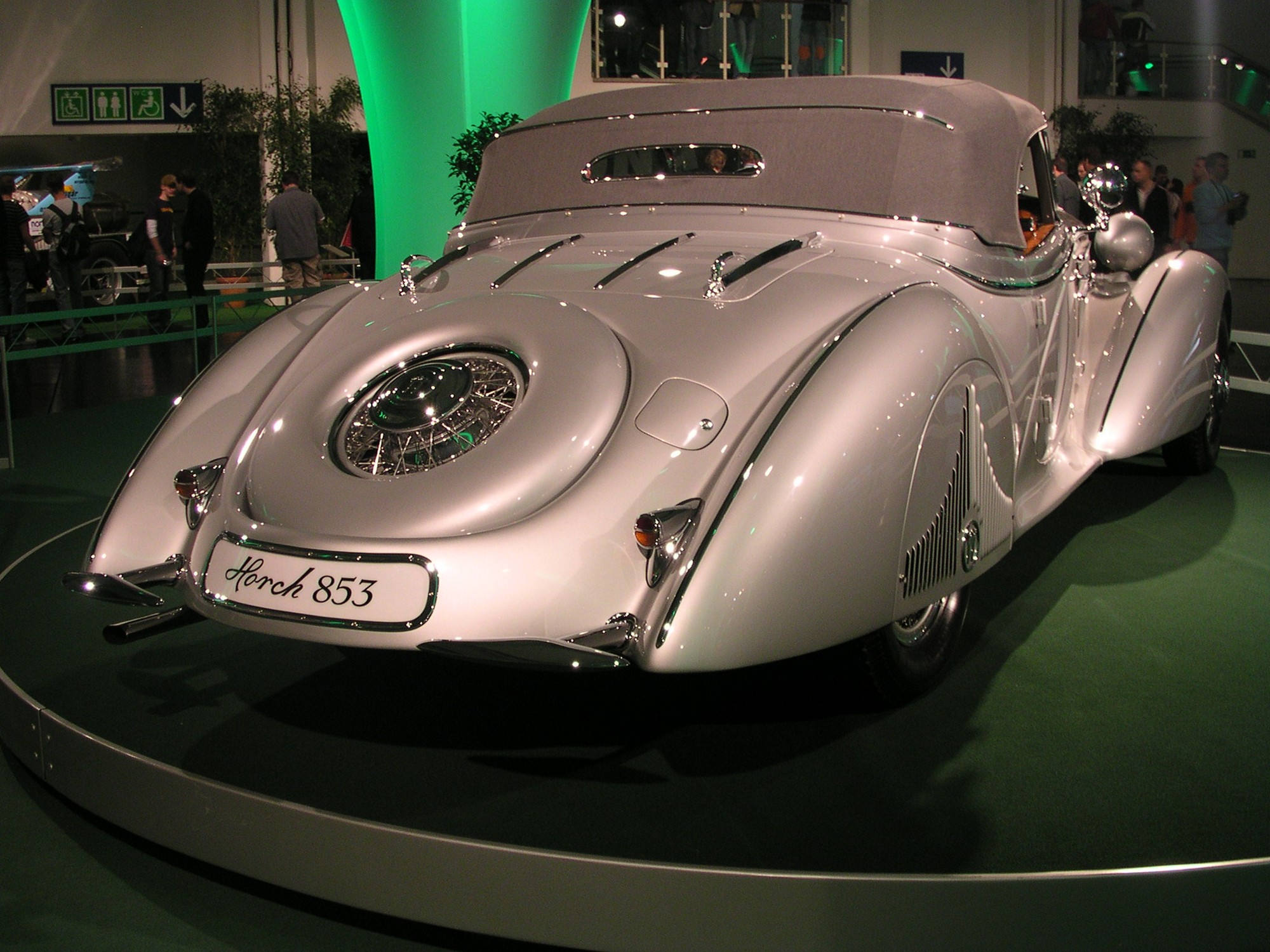
Voll & Ruhrbeck Sport Cabriolet, rear view

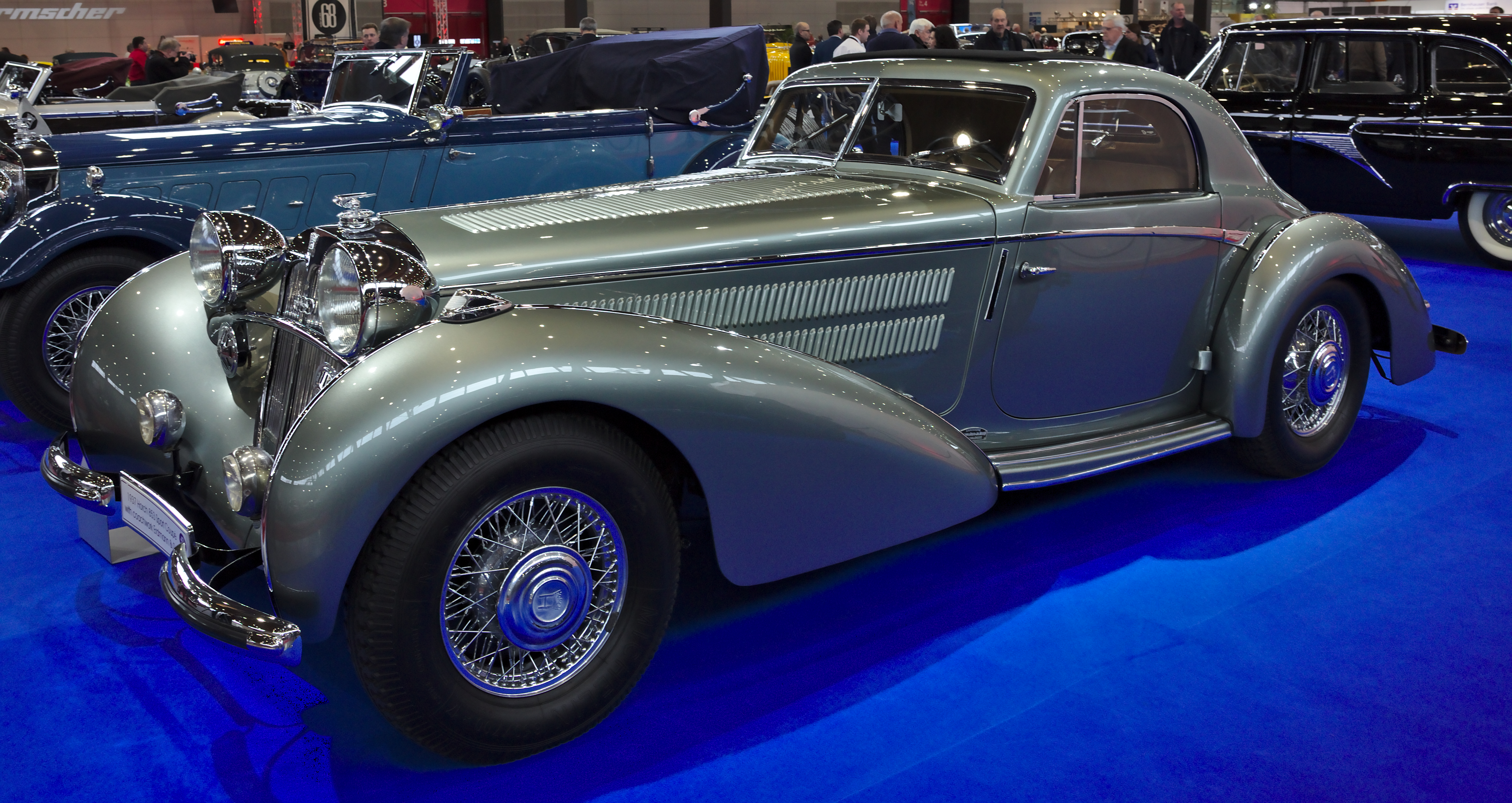
1937 Horch 853 Coupé, Erdmann & Rossi

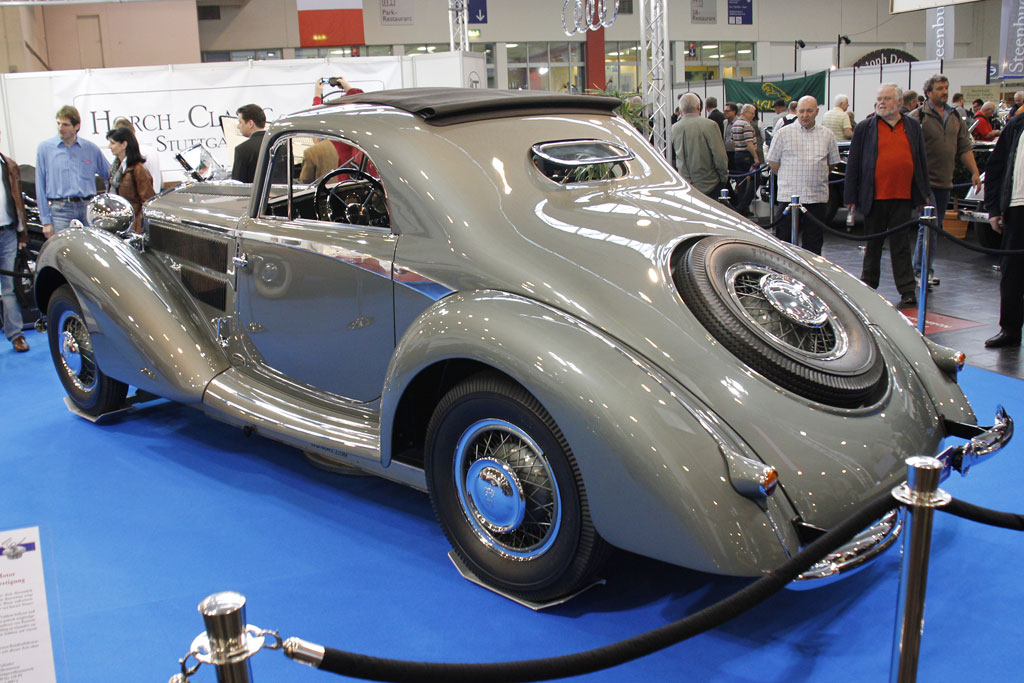
1937 Horch 853 Stromlinien Coupe 'Manuela' (Erdmann & Rossi, reconstruction)

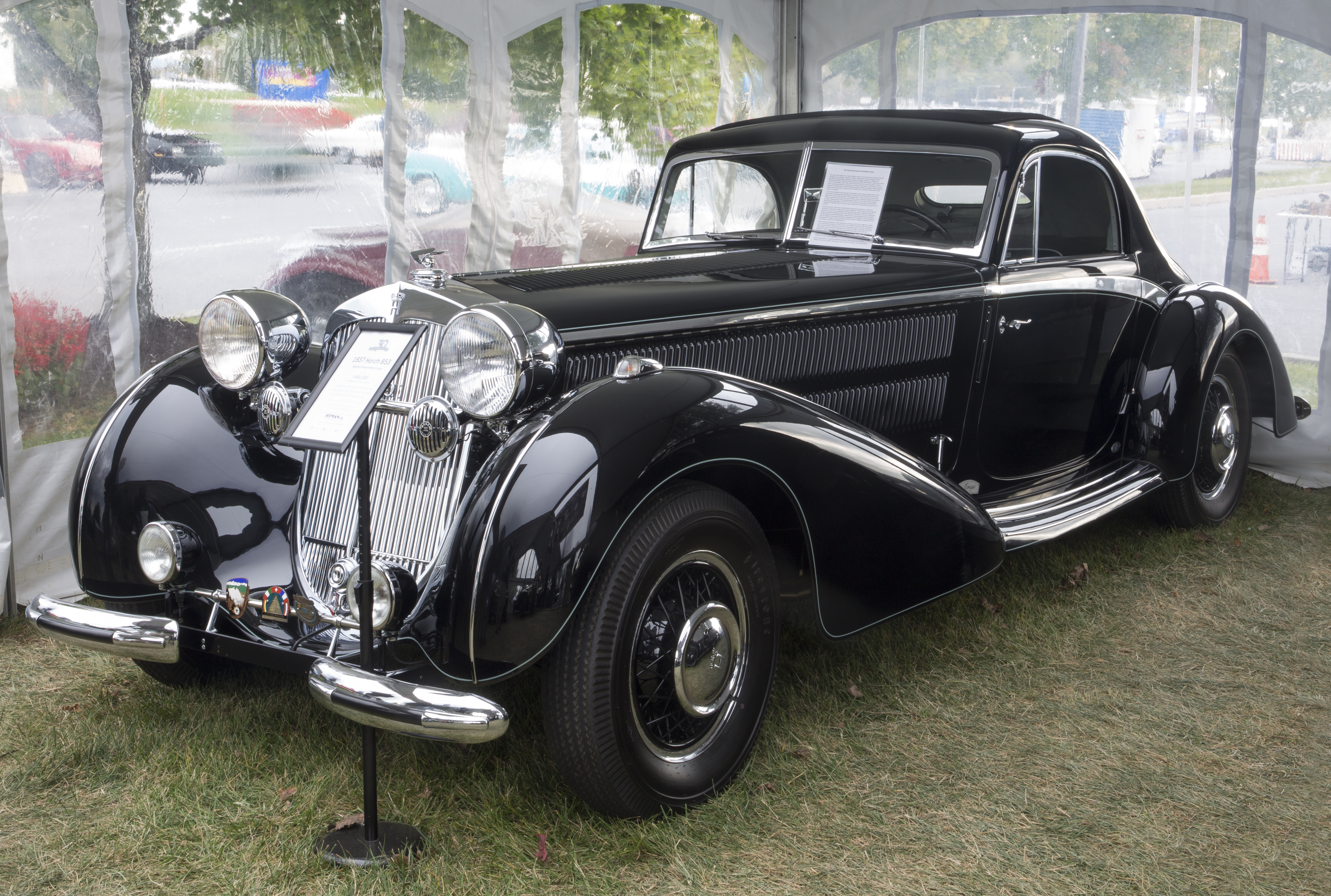
1937 Horch 853 Spezial Stromlinien-Coupé

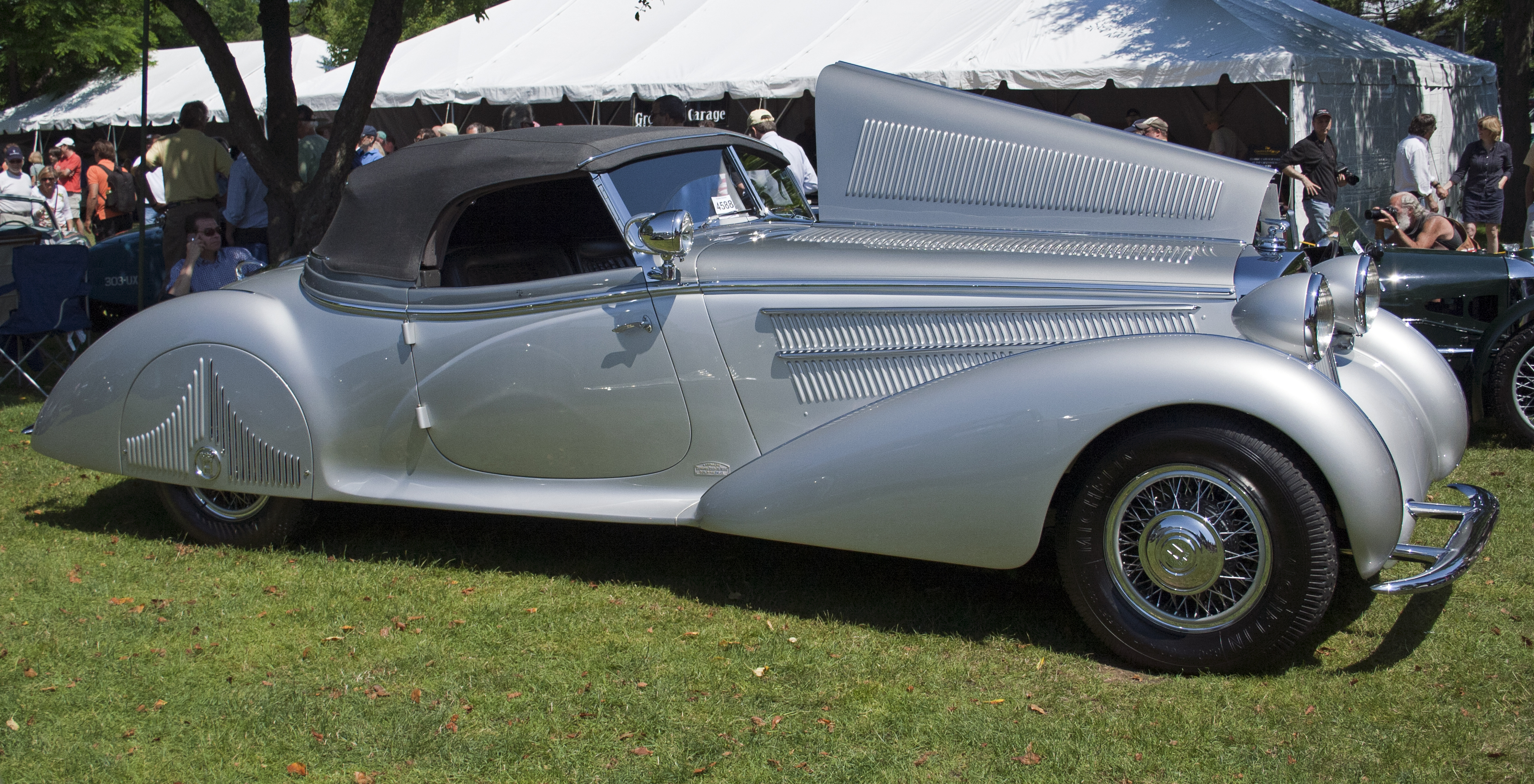
1937 Horch 853A Spezial Roadster, Erdmann & Rossi

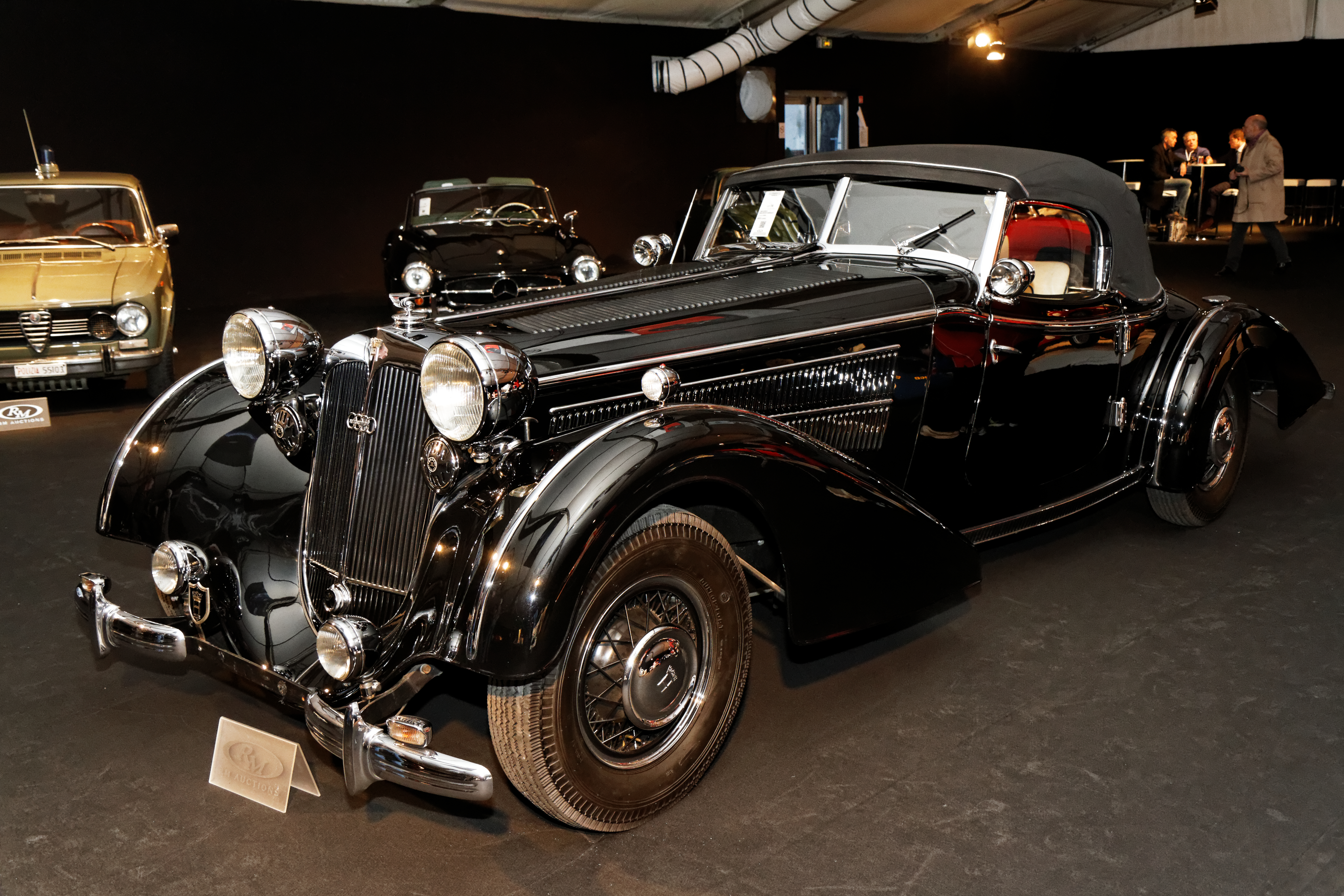
1940 Horch 853A

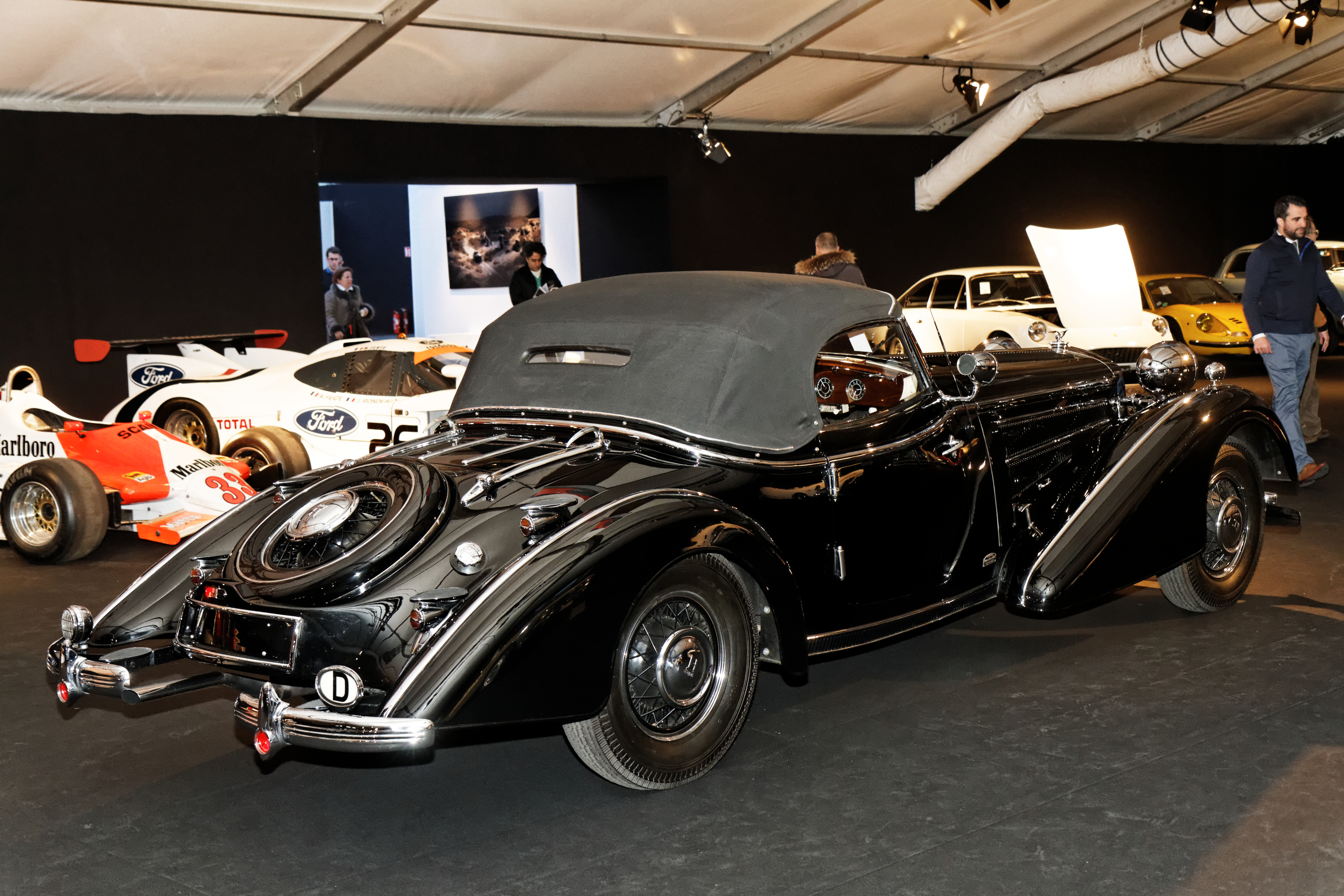
1940 Horch 853A

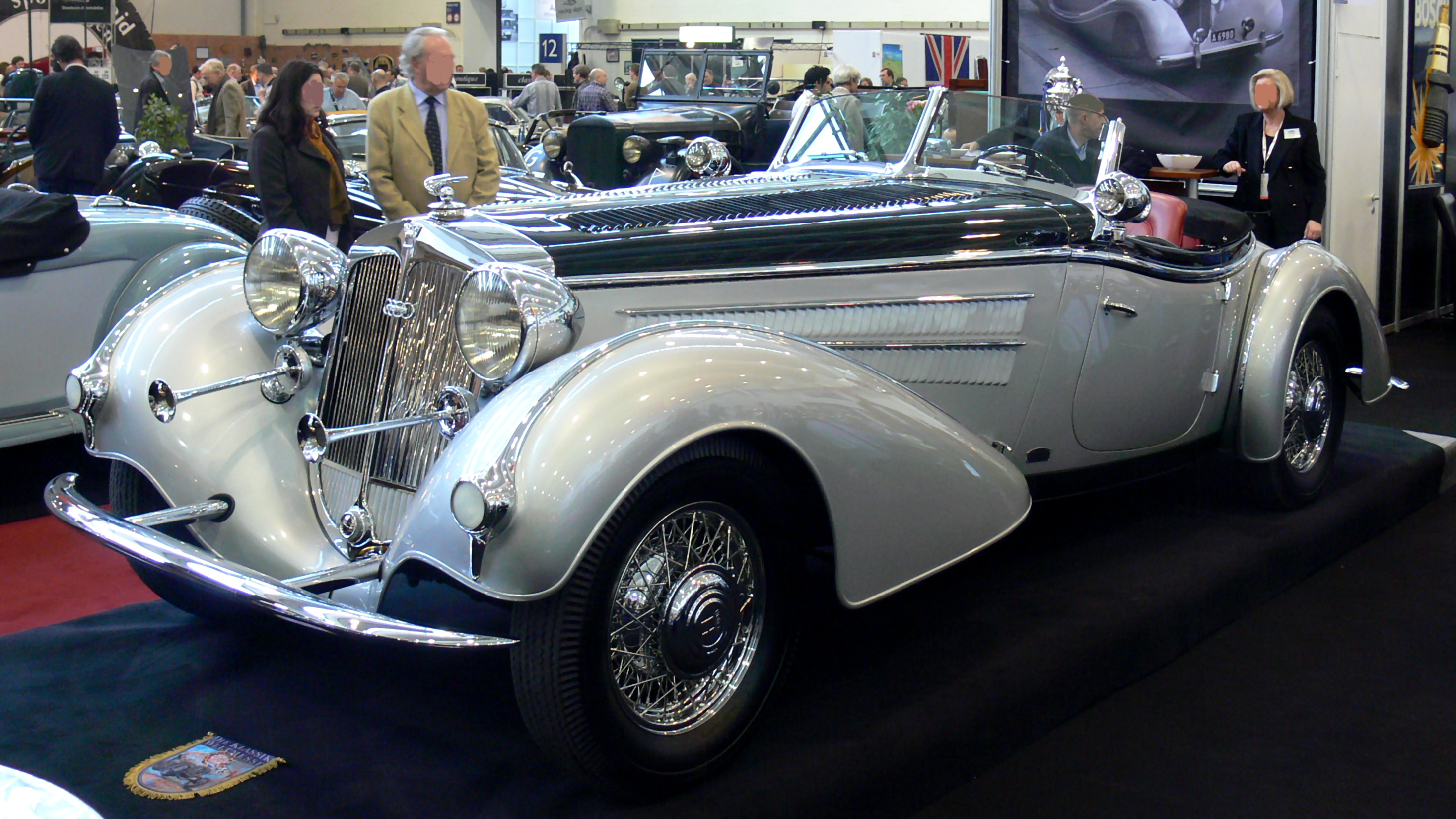
1938 Horch 855 Spezial Roadster

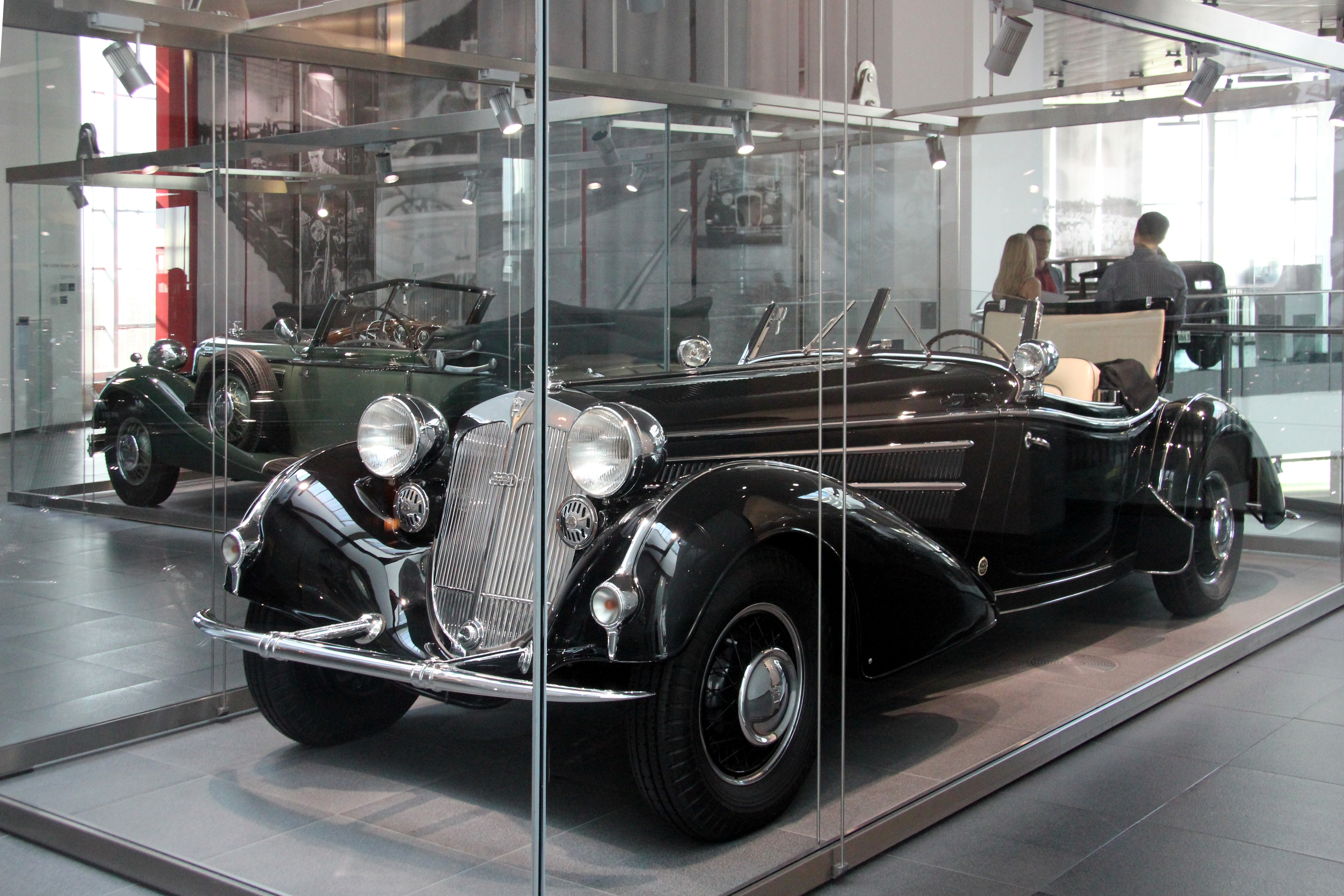
1939 Horch 855 Special Roadster by Gläser

== Technical data and comparation ==
=== Model 850, 851, 951, and 951A ===
	850	851	951	951A
Year of introduction	1935–1937	1937–1938	1937	1938–1940
Platform	PL4, PC4, SA	PL4, PC4		T6, PL4, PC4, Cb4
Engine	In line eight cylinder four stroke gasoline engine			
Valve timing	Overhead camshaft (OHC)			
Bore × Stroke	87 mm × 104 mm			
Displacement	4944 cc			
Max power	100 PS (74 kW; 99 hp)	120 PS (88 kW; 118 hp)		
Consumption	22 l/100 km		23 l/100 km	
Top speed	125 km/h (78 mph)		130 km/h (81 mph)	
Curb weight	2,650 kg (5,842 lb)		2,810 kg (6,195 lb)	
Total weight	3,150 kg (6,945 lb)		3,260 kg (7,187 lb)	
On board voltage	12 Volt			
Length	5,550 mm (218.5 in)		5,640 mm (222.0 in)	
Width	1,820 mm (71.7 in)		1,840 mm (72.4 in)	
Height	1,770 mm (69.7 in)		1,740 mm (68.5 in)	
Wheelbase	3,750 mm (147.6 in)			
Front/Rear Track	1470 mm/1500 mm		1510 mm/1516 mm	
Turning Circle	16.5 m (54.1 ft)			

=== Model 850 Sport, 853, 853A and 855 ===
	850 Sport	853	853A	855
Year of introduction	1935–1936	1935–1939	1938–1939	
Platform	Cb2			R2
Engine	In line eight cylinder four stroke gasoline engine			
Valve timing	Overhead camshaft (OHC)			
Bore × Stroke	87 mm × 104 mm			
Displacement	4944 cc			
Max power	100 PS (74 kW; 99 hp)	100 PS (74 kW; 99 hp) from 1937: 120 PS (88 kW; 118 hp)	120 PS (88 kW; 118 hp)	
Consumption	22 l/100 km			
Top speed	130 km/h (81 mph)	135 km/h (84 mph)		140 km/h (87 mph)
Curb weight	2,600 kg (5,732 lb)			2,400–2,450 kg (5,291–5,401 lb)
Total weight	2,950 kg (6,504 lb)			2,750–2,800 kg (6,063–6,173 lb)
On board voltage	12 Volt			
Length	5,350 mm (210.6 in)			5230–5350 mm
Width	1830 mm			1810 mm
Height	1580 mm			1560 mm
Wheelbase	3,450 mm (135.8 in)			3,300–3,450 mm (129.9–135.8 in)
Front/Rear Track	1510 mm/1576 mm			
Turning Circle	14.5 m			13.5–14.5 m

Bodywork codes

- T6 = Touring car
- PL4 = Limousine
- PC4 = Limousine Convertible
- Cb2 = Convertible
- Cb4 = Convertible
- R2 = Roadster
- SA = Special version

== Sources ==
- Oswald, Werner: Alle Horch Automobile 1900–1945. 1st Edition, Motorbuch Verlag, Stuttgart 1979, ISBN 3-87943-622-3
- Oswald, Werner: Deutsche Autos 1920–1945. Alle deutschen Personenwagen der damaligen Zeit. 10th Edition. Motorbuch Verlag, Stuttgart 1996, ISBN 3-87943-519-7
- Takashima, Shizuo (25 July 1977). "Vintage Car Salon: 1939 Horch 853 Cabriolet". Car Graphic (in Japanese). No. 197, issue 8/77. Nigensha Publishing Co., Ltd.
