= Car Masters: Rust to Riches =

2018 American reality TV show on Netflix

- Genre: Reality television
- Starring: Mark Towle; Tony Quinones; Constance Nunes; Shawn Pilot; Michael "Caveman" Pyle; Nick Smith
- Country of origin: United States
- Original language: English
- No. of seasons: 6
- No. of episodes: 48

Production
- Executive producers: Will Ehbrecht; Rob Hammersley; Mark Kadin; John Stokel; Michael Lutz; Scott Popjes
- Production location: California
- Running time: 31–40 min.
- Production company: Mak Pictures

Original release
- Network: Netflix
- Release: September 14, 2018 – October 23, 2024

Car Masters: Rust to Riches is an American reality television series on Netflix. The premise revolves around the crew from Gotham Garage, who have built a number of props for movie studios and television shows over the years. The group, led by Mark Towle, give classic cars modern makeovers in an attempt to raise their value and ultimately earn the company large profits. Each episode takes up one unique project.

The first season of Car Masters: Rust to Riches, consisting of eight episodes, was released on September 14, 2018. The second season was released on March 27, 2020. Season three premiered on August 4, 2021, season four on July 27, 2022, season five on December 13, 2023, and season six on October 23, 2024. The series was canceled after six seasons.

== Episodes ==
Season	Episodes	Originally released
1	8	September 14, 2018
2	8	March 27, 2020
3	8	August 4, 2021
4	8	July 27, 2022
5	8	December 13, 2023
6	8	October 23, 2024

=== Season 1 (2018) ===
No. overall	No. in season	Title	Original release date
1	1	"Outsmarted"	September 14, 2018
The Gotham Garage crew tries to convert a 1964 Ford Thunderbird into a bonafide "rocket car" while giving a smart car the monster-truck treatment.
2	2	"Green Is the New Black"	September 14, 2018
The team tackles a disassembled 1970 Chevy C-10 Fleetside in order to upgrade and trade it for a very valuable 1939 Zephyr car body.
3	3	"Buggin' Out"	September 14, 2018
The crew tries to help out a friend at a steep discount with a Volkswagen Bug hot-rod upgrade. Mark gets overly creative with a T-bucket overhaul.
4	4	"Junkyard Jewels"	September 14, 2018
Shawn and Mark get a sweet haul in a trade. Tony and Caveman tag-team a 1956 Chevy truck as Constance takes on a vintage VW microbus.
5	5	"Frank'N'Bus"	September 14, 2018
Shawn locates an unconventional option for the bus engine but struggles to find a potential buyer. The crew gets some help from a hot-rod icon.
6	6	"Life-Size"	September 14, 2018
The team aims to bring some Hot Wheels dreams to life in order to trade up for a rare Lincoln Futura replica. Shawn tries to rein in Mark’s impulses.
7	7	"Two for the Money"	September 14, 2018
The team members race to beat the clock in pursuit of a six-figure car. Mark's quest for a shop truck brings up meaningful memories.
8	8	"Back to the Future"	September 14, 2018
The crew hustles to complete its ambitious upgrade of a 1955 Futura in time for a big auto show. Has Gotham Garage finally landed its six-figure car?

=== Season 2 (2020) ===
No. overall	No. in season	Title	Original release date
9	1	"Electric Drag"	March 27, 2020
With the new shop open for business, the Gotham crew upgrades a 1953 Buick Special and then attempts a first: converting a gas engine to electric.
10	2	"Totaled Disaster"	March 27, 2020
After suffering a massive setback, the crew focuses on flipping a souped-up motorcycle for some cash and finding their next great trade-up car.
11	3	"Something Borrowed, Something Renewed"	March 27, 2020
As Shawn tries to rectify a deal gone bad, he pushes Mark to take on a sentimental project. The garage gets a chance to impress a splashy new client.
12	4	"Motorboatin'"	March 27, 2020
Mark pushes more boundaries with his next two upgrades: overhauling a minivan so it’s fit for rock stars and giving the Corvette treatment to a boat.
13	5	"Later, Vaydor"	March 27, 2020
Shawn pursues the pieces he needs for a big trade while Mark puts his stamp on a kit car. The garage is treated to a surprise visitor: Caveman’s mom.
14	6	"The Crow"	March 27, 2020
Mark and Shawn finally make progress on a big deal. The crew fixes up a jalopy for a local race, then dives in to upgrade a legit vintage race car.
15	7	"Deal with It"	March 27, 2020
As Mark overhauls a 1947 military-style Dodge Power Wagon, Shawn finds himself in the driver’s seat when he surveys buyers for a 1960 Plymouth XNR.
16	8	"Petersen Built"	March 27, 2020
The crew collectively weighs the opportunity of a lifetime — one that entails a great deal of prestige, but comes at a hefty cost.

=== Season 3 (2021) ===
No. overall	No. in season	Title	Original release date
17	1	"Taking the High-End Road"	August 4, 2021
Business is booming for the Gotham crew, thanks to their recent recognition. Next up, they tackle turning a 1933 Ford replica into an art deco Delahaye.
18	2	"The Italian Job"	August 4, 2021
To finance a costly job redo, the crew works on an El Camino cash car for a very demanding client while overhauling an International Harvester Scout.
19	3	"Ride from the Ashes"	August 4, 2021
With everyone desperate for cash, Tony sees opportunity in a sentimental build. Shawn has a tough time finding a buyer for Mark's woody iteration.
20	4	"Wheels on the Bus"	August 4, 2021
After some creative dealmaking, Shawn frets over Mark's hot take on a Bel Air. An academic achievement leads to a school bus upgrade for Caveman.
21	5	"Hot Tub Time Machine"	August 4, 2021
After some creative dealmaking, Shawn frets over Mark's hot take on a Bel Air. An academic achievement leads to a school bus upgrade for Caveman.
22	6	"Lowrider Long Shot"	August 4, 2021
Mark harbors a lowrider vision for a vintage Impala, aimed at financing his high-concept car. As expected, the plans quickly get very elaborate.
23	7	"Proof of Concept"	August 4, 2021
Mark's Hayabusa hopes are tied to his take on a Prius. Shawn tries to generate buzz ahead of an auction, but a real-world roadblock gets in his way.
24	8	"Going, Going... Gone?"	August 4, 2021
The crew gets creative when social distancing hurts their hopes for a big payday. But Mark's high price demands may end up costing them even more.

=== Season 4 (2022) ===
No. overall	No. in season	Title	Original release date
25	1	"Dumpster Divin'"	July 27, 2022
Eager to make some cash, the crew gets to work on two projects: creating a rat rod from scratch and making a customer's Elite Laser 917 race-worthy.
26	2	"All In the Family Wagon"	July 27, 2022
Shawn pitches the Gotham crew on an upgrade-and-trade deal involving a 1957 Chevy. Also on the agenda: an epic automotive mash-up.
27	3	"Ready for Lift Off"	July 27, 2022
Mark and Shawn visit a salvage yard with hopes of trading in their newly completed '57 Chevy for some good old-fashioned Detroit iron.
28	4	"Life of the Party Bus"	July 27, 2022
After losing money on a build, the Gotham crew gets back to doing what they do best by turning a 1954 Army ambulance into a blinged-out party bus.
29	5	"Brotherly Love"	July 27, 2022
A broker representing a wealthy client shows interest in the yet-to-be-sold concept car combo. Later, Caveman pitches the crew on a project for a pal.
30	6	"Riding High End"	July 27, 2022
The Gotham Garage crew sets out to turn a Lincoln Zephyr that's seen better days into something truly special for a high-profile car show.
31	7	"Go Big Rig or Go Home"	July 27, 2022
While the crew cranks on the Zephyr, Shawn pitches Mark on a deal involving a 1957 Kenworth big rig, just like the one Mark's dad used to drive.
32	8	"Special Delivery"	July 27, 2022
Pumped at the opportunity to be on the cover of a Speedway catalog, Mark and company pull out all the stops to get the Zephyr ready for its closeup.

=== Season 5 (2023) ===
No. overall	No. in season	Title	Original release date
33	1	"Upping the Ante"	December 13, 2023
A tribute to the '69 Dodge Charger Daytona gives newbies Brian and Jake a chance to prove their skills. Shawn's plan could snare a Ferrari 458 Italia.
34	2	"Hit the Gas"	December 13, 2023
The garage shifts into overdrive when a client wants a practically unheard-of modification to a Tesla. The transformed Dodge hits the track.
35	3	"Captain Man-Cave"	December 13, 2023
In a jam, Shawn needs to find a buyer for an unusual hot rod. Gotham Garage takes on a venture that could lead to lucrative business in the future.
36	4	"Franken-Tank"	December 13, 2023
Crew members air concerns about the garage's direction. A Harley Dyna gets a sleek, sinister look. Mark puzzles over a request for a novelty vehicle.
37	5	"Upgrade and Paid?"	December 13, 2023
Tony has $10K to make over a dual-cab bricknose truck. The rat rod takes shape. Mark and Shawn look at a Ferrari 360 Spider — which comes with baggage.
38	6	"Abandon Ship"	December 13, 2023
While waiting on the Ferrari news, the team turns an old pontoon boat into a floating party bus. A '69 Chevelle gets a 21st-century update.
39	7	"Divine Design"	December 13, 2023
Mark takes a huge risk and the shop needs cash — fast. A customer returns to check out a revamped American classic with a $60K price tag.
40	8	"Going For Broke"	December 13, 2023
Gotham makes bold modifications to the Ferrari while respecting its pedigree — a gamble that could make or break the shop. The car debuts at a party.

=== Season 6 (2024) ===
No. overall	No. in season	Title	Original release date
41	1	"Doubling Down"	October 23, 2024
The garage snags two Ferraris at a steal, but client expectations strain creativity. Mark rolls the dice on a '32 Ford Roadster build for a casino.
42	2	"The Future is Now"	October 23, 2024
A custom McLaren build puts Nick in a tough spot as Mark continues to fight for creative freedom. The team takes an iconic car back to the future — again.
43	3	"Hot Air"	October 23, 2024
After a major announcement, the crew dives into an airborne passion project. Caveman brings in a project for his demolition derby pal, Dangerous Dan.
44	4	"A Bit of a Stretch"	October 23, 2024
A whiskey maker's urgent request comes with a big payoff. Mark and Shawn spot a '70 Camaro SS at Dangerous Dan's salvage yard and try to strike a deal.
45	5	"Muscle Memory"	October 23, 2024
When an upgrade-and-trade deal threatens to go sideways, Shawn and Constance team up to negotiate a 454 big-block swap. Mark ponders the garage's future.
46	6	"A Green New Deal"	October 23, 2024
Tony builds a biodiesel conversion system for an eco-friendly Humvee. Mark revisits a project inspired by childhood memories of his father.
47	7	"A Salvage Card"	October 23, 2024
The garage works overtime to satisfy a client and save a Jaguar XK-E trade. A deal for a '78 Ferrari 308 causes friction in the workplace.
48	8	"Tomorrow's Throwback"	October 23, 2024
Mark shares his vision for the shop's future as the crew begins a "Magnum P.I."-inspired build. Later, Shawn tries to secure two legendary Hollywood cars.

== Release ==
The first season of Car Masters: Rust to Riches was released on September 14, 2018 on Netflix.
