= Bodie Stroud =

American custom automobile designer

- Born: Glendale, California, U.S.
- Occupation: Custom auto designer
- Notable work: X 100 pickup truck
- Website: bodiestroud.com

Bodie Stroud is a custom automobile designer and classic car builder. He starred in Rock My RV on the Travel Network.

== Early life ==
Stroud was born in Glendale, California and attended Verdugo Hills High School in Tujunga. While attending school, he refurbished a 1961 VW 18-window Micro Bus with friends. After graduating high school, Stroud attended one year at Pasadena, California's Art Center.

== Television and radio work ==
In 2004, Stroud appeared on Discovery Channel's TV Show, "Monster Garage", with builder and fabricator, Jesse James. In 2009 he won the Ford Design Award, "Best of Show at SEMA" in Las Vegas, with "The Scarliner" 1960 Ford Starliner. Bodie also appeared on "Hot Rod TV" in ‘09 with his 1956 Ford Truck as BS Industries prepared for the Grand National Roadster Show.

In 2010 Stroud used a 494 cubic-inch V-8 engine built originally by Ford for Can=Am racing. An original was used by Mario Andretti in his Holman & Moody McLaren M6B, although he placed no higher than third in those races. Andretti signed the valve cover of Strouds 1969 Ford Boss 494 Mustang, which was on display at the SEMA (Specialty Equipment Market Association) Convention that year. Stroud created a Documentary around this Mustang build, titled, "The Real Thing". It was produced by Julian King. This documentary was chosen and awarded by Vimeo as a "Vimeo Staff Pick". In 2010, Stroud appeared on Jay Leno's podcast, "Jay Leno's Garage", which highlighted his 1969 Mustang. He has since appeared several times on the podcast.

In 2011, Stroud started a Radio Show/Podcast, titled "In the Garage with Bodie Stroud". Stroud has interviewed people both in and out of the automotive industry. "In the Garage with Bodie Stroud" can be heard on iHeart Radio, iTunes and CRN Talk Radio.

Stroud has appeared on "Jay Leno's Garage" and on "Hot Rod TV", he has also been several times on Adam Carolla's Show,"Car Cast".

Stroud was host on the Travel Channel's TV Show, "Rock My RV", alongside Poison's Bret Michaels. "Rock My RV" first aired on the Travel Network in 2013 and included 16 "one hour" episodes. Each week, Stroud and Bret Michaels spent time creating custom RV's for several travelers.

In Spring of 2015, Bodie Stroud Industries' X-100 Pick Up Truck was featured on the Cover of "Classic Trucks" Magazine for June 2015, and also appeared in "Motor Trend" Magazine, as well as "The Detroit News" Newspaper.

== Patents ==
As an engineer and innovator as well, Stroud has patented his line of Bodie Stroud Industries EZ-Aline adjustable tubular control arms to simplify the lives of mechanics, creating a quick solution to an otherwise lengthy process.

== Products ==
Stroud is currently offers his line of BSI 1956 "X-100" Pickup Trucks, which are available to order, in three different customized colors. As seen recently in "Motor Trend" Magazine.

He also has a fashion line of tees, hoodies and customized auto parts under the brand "Bodie Stroud Industries".
