= Cliff Hall (photographer) =

American photographer and designer

- Born: August 11, 1925; Los Angeles, California
- Died: January 5, 2020 (aged 94); Loma Linda, California
- Occupations: Photographer, designer

Clifford Augustus Hall (11 August 1925 – 5 January 2020) was a native Angeleno and photographer who documented many parties and celebrations in some of the city's wealthiest neighborhoods, and shot images of the riots that occurred in the city in 1992. He also conceived of and designed a car that he hoped would be both an inexpensive, agile city car suited to Los Angeles driving conditions, and a source of reliable, well-paying jobs that would allow Black families in Los Angeles to build wealth.

== Early years ==
Hall was born in Los Angeles on 11 August 1925. His family had arrived in the Los Angeles area in 1903.

As a child, he built soapbox racers with his friend Wallace Arima.

Hall lived with his grandmother from 1930 until 1946. From 1943 to 1946 he served in the United States Navy, where he was trained in electronics.

Hall's grandfather had been a watchmaker, and his maternal great-uncles had built their own cars and aircraft. In addition to the soapbox racers he built as a child, Hall later built a miniature electric car for his young son. This project also gave him experience working with fiberglass.

== Photographic and design career ==
After his stint in the Navy, Hall studied at the Fred Archer School of Photography. He was introduced to the school by Arima.

Early in his career he took photos of graduations and sweet-sixteen parties for residents of Hollywood and Bel-Air. Throughout the 1950s and 1960s Hall became a popular choice of photographer for gala events held in Los Angeles' most expensive neighborhoods, some of which he would have been barred from purchasing a home in.

Hall worked at the Los Angeles Sentinel, one of the oldest and most influential African-American newspapers in the Western United States, and served as that paper's chief photographer for twenty-seven years. Jessie Mae Brown Beavers, executive editor for the Sentinel, assigned Hall to photograph the annual "Los Angeles Best Dressed" celebration, which became one of the paper's most popular features. Hall's photographs of the 1992 Los Angeles riots became an important part of the historical record of those events.

Hall mentored other aspiring photographers. In 1958 he established the Halmont Graphics studio in partnership with cofounder Lamonte McLemore, who was also an original member of The 5th Dimension singing group. McLemore was the first Black photographer hired by Harper's Bazaar, and he went on to a long photographic career with Ebony. Hall also trained Howard Bingham in photography at the Sentinel. Bingham was hired by Life magazine, for whom he shot the photos for a feature on the Black Panther Party, and later documented the life and career of boxer Muhammad Ali.

Hall used his mechanical skills in his photography business by building and outfitting a mobile photo lab that allowed him to shoot photos at a party and provide the client with finished prints by the end of the event.

== Corwin Getaway ==
I was going to be the Martin Luther King Jr. of industry.

— Cliff Hall

Hall began development of a sports car, later named the Corwin Getaway, shortly after the Watts Riots of 1965, and the prototype was completed in 1969. Hall planned that the Getaway would be "built by Black hands in a Black community".

The finished car appeared at the 1970 Los Angeles Auto Show. While the project received support from a number of celebrities, Hall was unable to secure financing to put the Getaway into production. After storing the car for several years, he eventually donated the Getaway to the Petersen Automotive Museum.

== Later years ==
Hall earned a reputation as an inventor, designer, and artist. Those that knew him describe him as a steady fount of ideas.

Although he was unable to secure enough funding to put the Getaway into full production, Hall continued to design innovative vehicles. Working with designer Dennis Huguley, he conceived of a narrow, two-passenger, three-wheeled "Magic Machine" that combined a motorcycle riding position with the look of an aircraft canopy and a hybrid gas/electric powertrain.

In his later years, Hall moved to a retirement complex in Highland, California. He died in Loma Linda, California on 5 January 2020.

== Honors ==
The California African American Museum included Hall in a show that featured the work of African American photographers who had worked in the Los Angeles area from 1940 on. The show was titled "Light Catchers", and ran from 20 March 2015 to 7 June 2015.
