= Love's Lines, Angles and Rhymes =

Studio album by the 5th Dimension
- Released: February 1, 1971
- Recorded: Wally Heider, Los Angeles
- Label: Bell
- Producer: Bones Howe

The 5th Dimension chronology
Portrait (1970)	Love's Lines, Angles and Rhymes (1971)	Reflections (1971)

Love's Lines, Angles and Rhymes is the sixth album by the American pop group The 5th Dimension, released in 1971. The title song had been recorded originally by Diana Ross the previous year. It reached #17 on Billboard's Top 200 Album Chart and became the band's third consecutive album to be certified Gold.

Following the success of "One Less Bell to Answer" featuring Marilyn McCoo as lead vocalist, she was once again chosen to take the reins for the first single from the album. The record, after which the album was named, became another Top 20 hit for The 5th. The follow-up single, "Light Sings", fared less well, just missing the Top 40. No other singles were issued from this album, as Bell Records decided to prepare for the group's first 'live' album release instead.

The track "He's a Runner" was originally slated to appear on The Age of Aquarius, and is listed on the covers of early issues of the album.

== Track listing ==
Side one

1. "Time and Love" (Laura Nyro)
2. "Love's Lines, Angles and Rhymes" (Dorothea Joyce)
3. "What Does It Take" (Harvey Fuqua, Johnny Bristol, Vernon Bullock)
4. "Guess Who" (Jesse Belvin, JoAnne Belvin)
5. "Viva Tirado" (Gerald Wilson, Norman Gimbel)

Side two

6. "Light Sings" (Gary William Friedman, Will Holt)
7. "The Rainmaker" (Bill Martin, Harry Nilsson)
8. "He's a Runner" (Laura Nyro)
9. "The Singer" (Elliott Willensky, Lamonte McLemore)
10. "Every Night" (Paul McCartney)

== Personnel ==
=== The 5th Dimension ===
- Marilyn McCoo - lead vocals (tracks 1–2), background vocals
- Florence LaRue - lead vocals (tracks 1, 8), background vocals
- Billy Davis Jr. - lead vocals (tracks 6–7, 9–10), background vocals
- Lamonte McLemore - background vocals
- Ron Townson - background vocals

=== Instrumentalists ===
- Hal Blaine - drums
- Joe Osborn, Max Bennett - bass guitar
- Larry Knechtel, Gary Illingworth - keyboards
- Dennis Budimir, Fred Tackett, Mike Deasy, Michael Anthony - guitar
- Jimmy Rowles - piano
- Catherine Gothoffer - harp
- Jack Arnold, Larry Bunker, Victor Feldman - percussion
- Jim Horn, Tom Scott, Pete Christlieb, Lanny Morgan - saxophone
- Lew McCreary, Bob Edmondson - trombone
- Bud Brisbois, Chuck Findley, Oliver Mitchell, Ray Triscari - trumpet
- The Sid Sharp String Section - strings

== Charts ==
=== Album ===
Weekly chart peaks for Love's Lines, Angles and Rhymes
Chart (1971)	Peak position
CAN RPM Top LP's	14
US Billboard Top LP's	17
US Billboard Hot R&B LP's	10
US Cashbox Top 100 Albums	12

=== Singles ===
Billboard (United States)

Year	Song	Peak position
1971	Love's Lines, Angles and Rhymes	19
1971	Light Sings	44

== Certifications ==
Region	Certification	Certified units/sales
United States (RIAA)	Gold	500,000^{^}
^{^} Shipments figures based on certification alone.
