= Schlamme =

Schlamme is a surname. Notable people with the surname include:

- Martha Schlamme (1923–1985), Austrian-born American singer
- Thomas Schlamme (born 1950), American television director and producer

== See also ==
- Schlamelcher
