= Hannah Whitall Smith =

American writer (1832–1911)

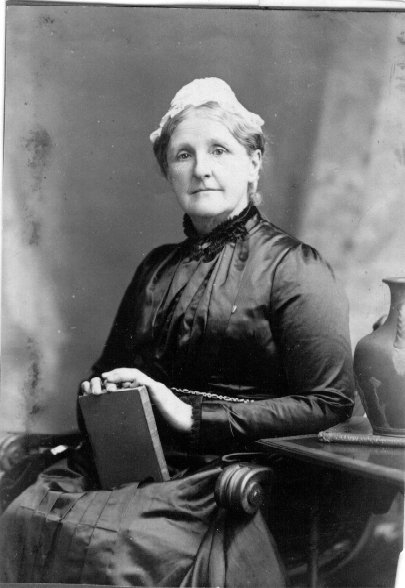
- Born: Hannah Tatum Whitall; February 7, 1832; Philadelphia, Pennsylvania, U.S.
- Died: May 1, 1911 (aged 79); England
- Spouse: Robert Pearsall Smith (m. 1851; died 1898)
- Children: 7 (including Mary, Logan and Alys)

Hannah Tatum Whitall Smith (February 7, 1832 – May 1, 1911) was a lay speaker and author in the Holiness movement in the United States and the Higher Life movement in the United Kingdom. She was also active in the women's suffrage movement and the temperance movement.

== Early years ==
Born in Philadelphia, Smith was from a long line of prominent and influential Quakers in New Jersey. Hannah Tatum Whitall was the daughter of John Mickle Whitall and Mary Tatum Whitall. Her most famous ancestor was Ann Cooper Whitall.

== Career ==
On November 5, 1851, Hannah married Robert Pearsall Smith, a man who also descended from a long line of prominent Quakers in the region. The Smiths settled in Germantown, Pennsylvania. They disassociated themselves somewhat from the Quakers in 1858 after a conversion experience, but Mrs. Smith continued to believe a great deal of Quaker doctrine and gloried in her Quaker background and practices. The Smiths were highly influenced firstly by the Plymouth Brethren, and then by the Methodist revivalists. Out of influence from the Wesleyan doctrine of sanctification, and in accordance with Quaker teaching and influences from spiritualism, Mrs. Smith and her husband formulated and promulgated the Keswick theology. They were also influenced by William Boardman, who wrote The Higher Christian Life (1858).

From 1864 to 1868, Robert and Hannah Smith lived in Millville, New Jersey. Robert managed Hannah’s father’s business, the Whitall, Tatum & Company glass factories.

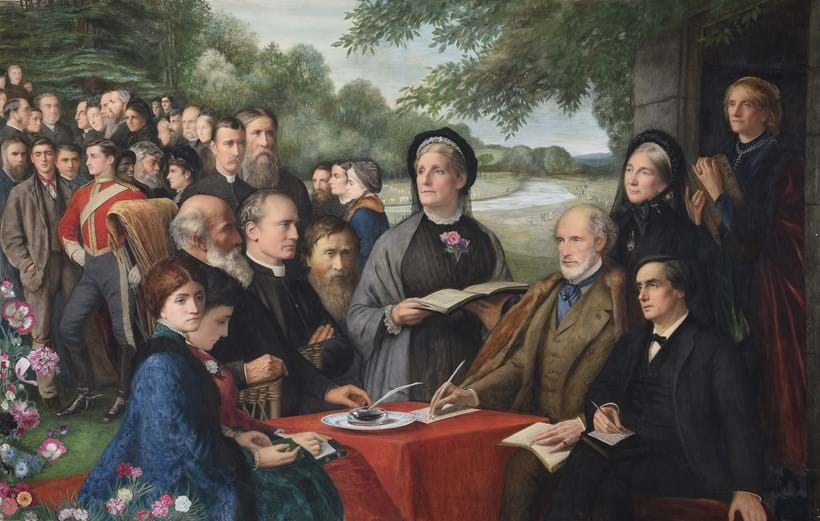
Hannah Whitall Smith at the Broadlands Conference - central figure from a painting by Edward Clifford

William Boardman apparently groomed Robert and Hannah Smith to join the Holiness movement as speakers. From 1873–1874 they spoke at various places in England, including Oxford, teaching on the subjects of the "higher life" and "holiness," after a foundational meeting at the Broadlands Conference sponsored by the spiritualists Lord and Lady Mount Temple. A painting was commissioned of Broadlands Conference and she was the central figure of the painting by Edward Clifford. Her husband is not in the painting as he had been unfaithful. The text she is reading notes that you can put your trust in God but not in men. The tiny white figures behind her are thought to represent souls contacted by spiritualism.

In 1874 Hannah helped found the Woman’s Christian Temperance Union (WCTU). That same year, the Smiths traveled to the German Empire and Switzerland, where they preached in several major cities. In 1875, they returned to England and conducted meetings in Brighton. Due to a sexual scandal involving Robert, their visit to England came to an abrupt halt. Their marriage came under serious strain through Robert Smith's persistent adultery and Mrs. Smith's advocacy of strong feminist views of the role of women that were contrary to the patriarchal ideas dominant in their time. She also served as the national superintendent of the WCTU Evangelistic Department, producing a network of activists across many countries. By this time, however, Hannah's work with the WCTU as well as her book, The Christian’s Secret of a Happy Life (1875), was well-known internationally. Mary Clement Leavitt, WCTU world missionary having just been in New Zealand wrote to Hannah Smith in August 1885 to ask for contacts in England, stating: "I met a Rev. Mr. Hill, Anglican missionary in Auckland, an exalted servant of the Lord, and my chief helper there who owes, he says, what he is spiritually to you, under the Lord. I find your writings in many households, and have met several persons who attended your meetings in England."

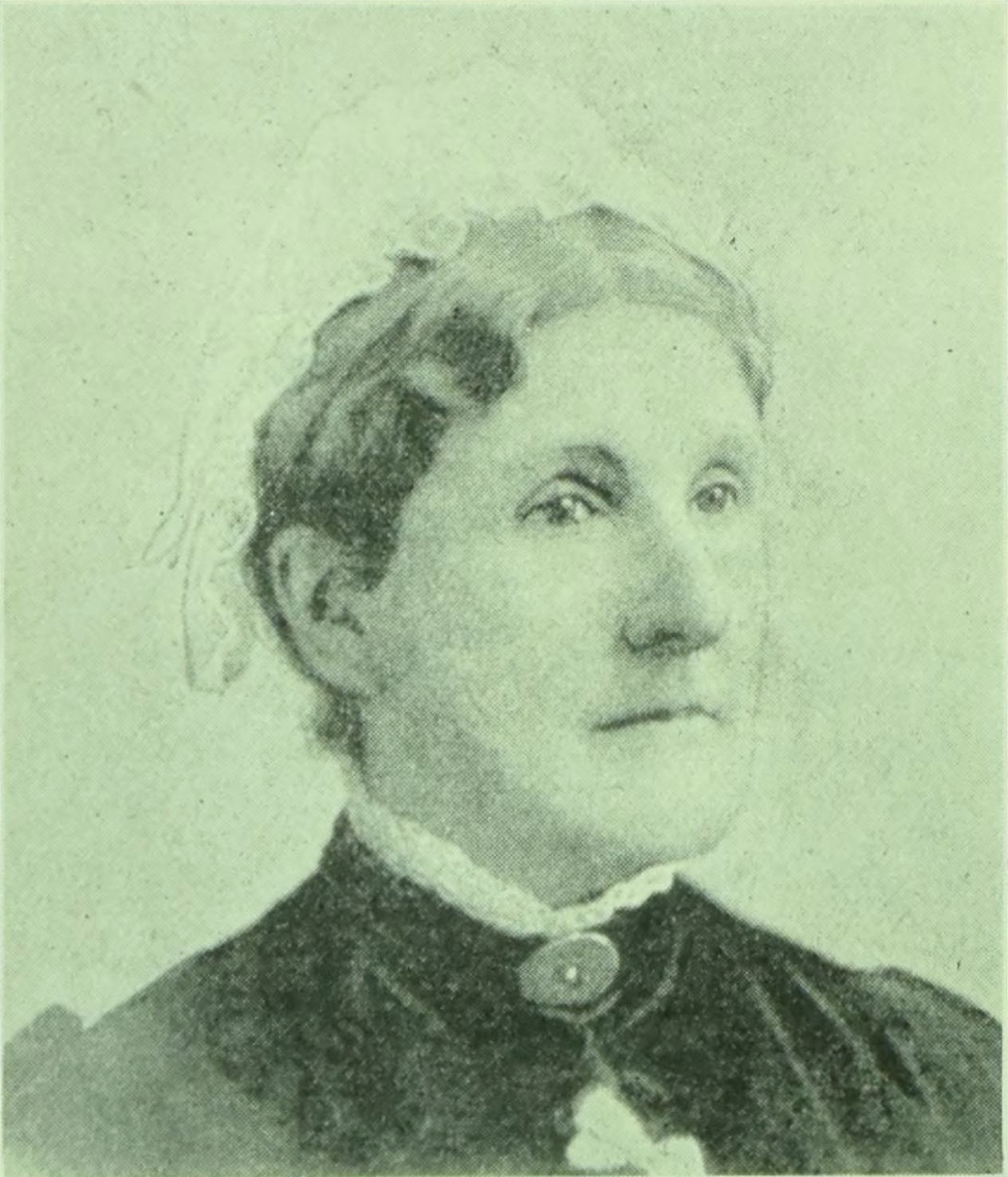
Undated image of Smith

In 1888, the Smith family moved to England because their daughter Mary married an English barrister, Frank Costelloe. They eventually divorced, and Mary then married the critic Bernard Berenson. It was in England that their younger daughter Alys Pearsall Smith met and married the philosopher Bertrand Russell. Logan Pearsall Smith became an essayist and critic.

Hannah Whitall Smith had seven children in all, but only three—Mary, Alys Pearsall, and Logan Pearsall—survived to adulthood. Her niece Martha Carey Thomas was the first female dean of any college in America and an active suffragist.

Hannah Whitall Smith died in England in 1911.

== Writings and legacy ==
Hannah Whitall Smith’s book The Christian’s Secret of a Happy Life (1875) (Note: "In 1870 Hannah Whitall Smith wrote what has become a classic of joyous Christianity, The Christian's Secret of a Happy Life. The title barely hints at the depths of that perceptive book. It is no shallow "four easy steps to successful living." Studiously, the writer defines the shape of a full and abundant life hid in God. Then she carefully reveals the difficulties to this way and finally charts the results of a life abandoned to God. What is the Christian's secret to a happy life? It is best summed up by her chapter entitled "The Joy of Obedience." Joy comes through obedience to Christ, and joy results from obedience to Christ. Without obedience joy is hollow and artificial.") is an extremely popular book of Christian mysticism and practical Holiness theology. It is still widely read today. She wrote her spiritual autobiography, The Unselfishness of God And How I Discovered It, in 1903. Many publications of that book omit the three chapters which explain how she became a Christian universalist. Hannah Whitall Smith wrote "The God of All Comfort" in 1906, five years before her death in 1911.
