= Love, Linda: The Life of Mrs. Cole Porter =

Love, Linda: The Life Of Mrs. Cole Porter
- Music: Cole Porter
- Lyrics: Cole Porter
- Book: Stevie Holland; Gary William Friedman
- Basis: The life and marriage of Linda Lee Thomas and Cole Porter
- Productions: New York City (2009–2013)

Love, Linda: The Life Of Mrs. Cole Porter is a theatrical and musical adventure about the life of Linda Lee Thomas, the socialite wife of composer Cole Porter, with a Book by Stevie Holland with Gary William Friedman, Music and Lyrics by Cole Porter, and Arrangements and Additional Music by Gary William Friedman. It originally starred Stevie Holland. It opened at the Triad Theater on October 28, 2009 for an initial limited run through November 21, 2009, and returned for a brief run in 2010, closing on June 9, 2010, before touring regionally. The show had its Off-Broadway premiere, with direction by Richard Maltby, Jr., in a limited engagement at the York Theatre, beginning December 3, 2013, and closing January 5th, 2014. A film of the stage version starring Stevie Holland was released in 2021.

== Cast album ==
Love, Linda: The Life Of Mrs. Cole Porter

Studio album by Stevie Holland
- Released: February 9, 2010
- Length: 47:00
- Label: 150 Music
- Producer: Gary William Friedman

Stevie Holland chronology
Before Love Has Gone (2008)	Love, Linda: The Life Of Mrs. Cole Porter (2010)	Life Goes On (2015)

Love, Linda: The Life Of Mrs. Cole Porter is a studio album by jazz vocalist Stevie Holland. It is Holland’s seventh album and was released by 150 Music on February 9, 2010, and re-issued September 24, 2018, with new material. It is the original cast recording from the Off-Broadway musical Love, Linda: The Life Of Mrs. Cole Porter.

=== Track listing ===
No.	Title	Writer(s)	Length
1.	"Opening: When A Woman's In Love (Theme)/So In Love/What Is This Thing Called Love?"	Cole Porter	5:58
2.	"Ours"	Cole Porter	2:25
3.	"I Love Paris"	Cole Porter	3:58
4.	"Miss Otis Regrets"	Cole Porter	2:14
5.	"The Scampi"	Cole Porter	2:33
6.	"In the Still of the Night"	Cole Porter	3:49
7.	"Ours (Reprise)"	Cole Porter	1:18
8.	"Medley"	Cole Porter	2:28
9.	"Let’s Be Buddies"	Cole Porter	2:18
10.	"Ridin’ High"	Cole Porter	3:04
11.	"Love for Sale"	Cole Porter	2:38
12.	"My Heart Belongs to Daddy"	Cole Porter	2:55
13.	"Throwing A Ball Tonight"	Cole Porter	3:15
14.	"Night And Day/There’s A Hollywood That’s Good"	Cole Porter	1:27
15.	"Wunderbar"	Cole Porter	2:36
16.	"When A Woman’s in Love"	Cole Porter	2:31

=== Personnel ===
- Tim Peierls - Gary William Friedman and Stevie Holland, producers
- Gary William Friedman - arrangements
- Landon Knoblock - piano
- Deniz Cordell - piano
- Peter Brendler - bass
- Jeff Davis - drums
