= Robert Pearsall Smith =

American evangelist (1827–1898)

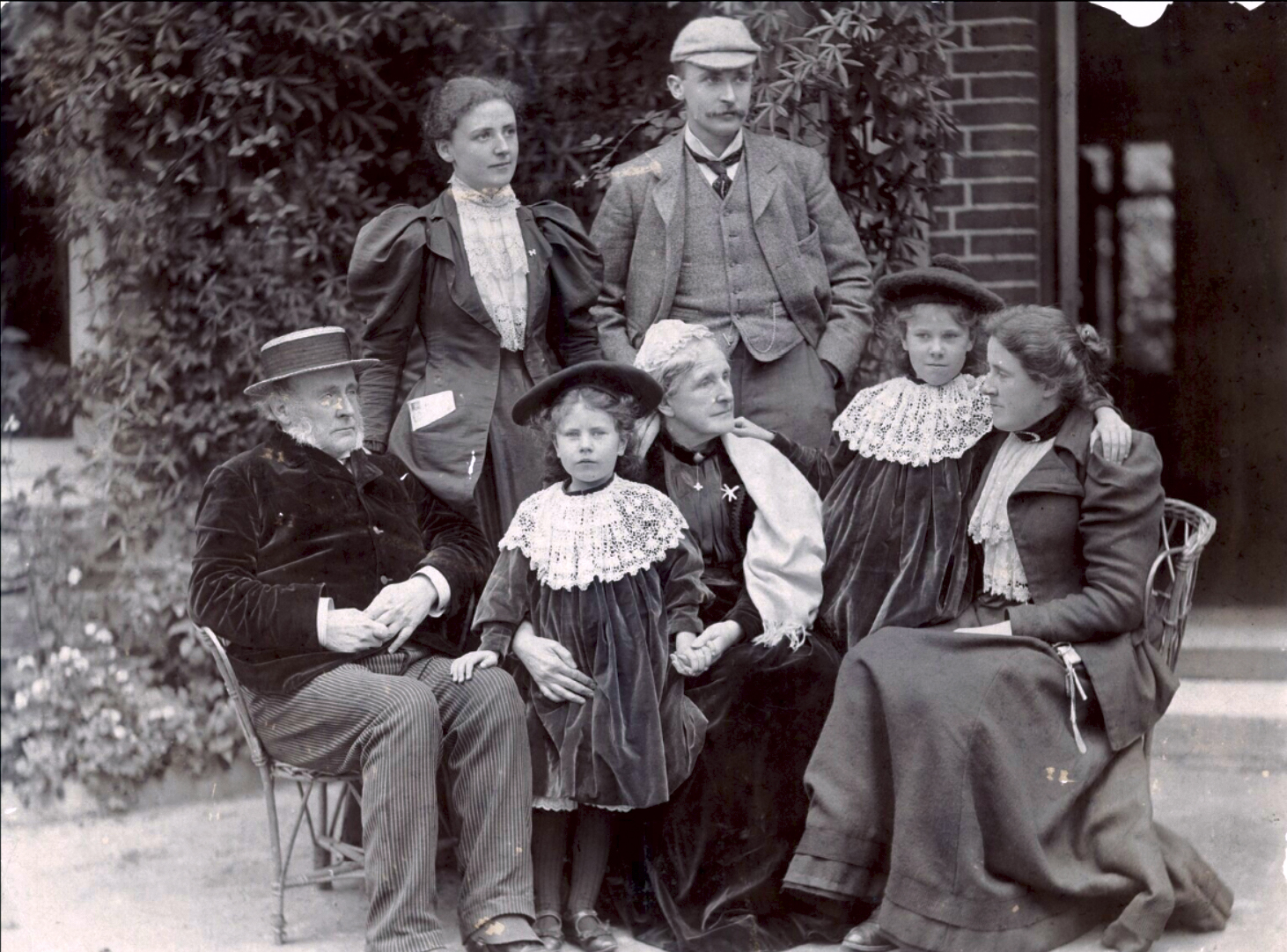
Pearsall Smith family (Robert seated on the left)

Robert Pearsall Smith (1827–1898) was a lay leader in the Holiness movement in the United States and the Higher Life movement in Great Britain. His book Holiness Through Faith (1870) is one of the foundational works of the Holiness movement. He was also a businessman in the Philadelphia area, publishing maps and managing a glass factory.

== Biography ==
=== Early life ===
Robert Pearsall Smith was the son of John Jay Smith and Rachel Pearsall. Descended from a long line of influential Quakers, in Pennsylvania and New Jersey, he was a descendant of John Smith, who started one of the first insurance companies in Philadelphia and was one of the founders of the Philadelphia Hospital. He was also a descendant of James Logan, secretary of William Penn and the founder of the first lending library in America, the Loganian Library.

During the 1840s, Robert's father was the librarian of the Philadelphia Library Company, which now had oversight of their ancestral library, the Loganian. The library employed the prestigious architect and surveyor James Charles Sidney who also produced maps that Robert published; many are now valuable historical artifacts.

In 1851, Smith married Hannah Tatum Whitall, a woman who also descended from a line of prominent Quakers in the region. The Smiths settled in Germantown, Pennsylvania. From 1864 to 1868, they lived in Millville, New Jersey where Robert managed Hannah's father's business, the Whitall, Tatum & Company glass factories.

They were much influenced by Methodist revivalists and adopted the doctrine in Wesleyan theology of sanctification. They were also influenced by William E. Boardman, who wrote The Higher Christian Life (1859) who apparently groomed Robert and Hannah Smith to join the Holiness movement as speakers.

=== Success and Scandal ===
In the 1870s, American evangelists such as Dwight L. Moody and Ira D. Sankey drew huge crowds in London. In 1873, Robert and Hannah also crossed the Atlantic to speak at various places in England, including Oxford, teaching on the subjects of the "higher life" and "holiness". The following year, after preaching in front of royalty and taking breakfast with Gladstone they travelled to Germany and Switzerland, where they preached in several major cities.

In 1875, they returned to England and conducted meetings in Brighton where scandal arose over a private spiritual initiation which took place between Smith and a female American writer who alleged contact of a sexual nature. Although admitting that he "had put his arm around her", he insisted that his actions would not "have been more pure to my own daughter". However, at the evangelical tribunal that followed, Smith pledged "to abstain at once from public work". Although the details of the allegations were never released, one member stating he feared the effect on public morality, Smith never recovered and having "lost his faith, withdrew from public gaze and spent most of the rest of his life as an invalid".

In 1888, the Smith family moved to north Sussex, England when their daughter Mary married an Irish barrister, Frank Costelloe; she later married Bernard Berenson. Their daughter Alys Pearsall Smith met and married the philosopher Bertrand Russell. Their son, Logan Pearsall Smith, became an essayist and critic.
