= Hochman =

Hochman is a surname. Notable people with the surname include:

- Calvin Hoffman (1906–1986), American theater press agent and writer
- Dayan Hochman-Vigil, American attorney and member of the New Mexico House of Representatives
- Gilad Hochman (born 1982), Israeli classical music composer
- Henryk Hochman (c. 1879–1943), Polish Jewish sculptor
- Israel J. Hochman (c. 1875–1940), American klezmer musician
- Larry Hochman (born 1953), American orchestrator and composer
- Nathan Hochman (born 1963), American lawyer, politician and attorney
- Sandra Hochman (born 1936), American poet, novelist, and documentary film maker
- Stan Hochman (1928–2015), American sportswriter
- Stanley Hochman (1924–2014), American editor and translator

== See also ==
- Hoffman (disambiguation)
