= Light Sings =

- Portuguese release picture sleeve

Single by The 5th Dimension

from the album Love's Lines, Angles and Rhymes
- B-side: "Viva! (Viva Tirado)"
- Released: May 1971
- Genre: Soul
- Length: 3:30
- Label: Bell 999
- Songwriter(s): Will Holt, Gary William Friedman
- Producer(s): Bones Howe

The 5th Dimension singles chronology
"Love's Lines, Angles and Rhymes" (1971)	"Light Sings" (1971)	"Never My Love (Live)" (1971)

"Light Sings" is a song written by Will Holt and Gary William Friedman and performed by The 5th Dimension. It reached #12 on the U.S. adult contemporary chart, #15 on the Canadian adult contemporary chart, #22 on the Canadian pop chart, and #44 on the Billboard Hot 100 in 1971. It was featured on their 1971 album, Love's Lines, Angles and Rhymes.

The song was produced by Bones Howe and arranged by Bob Alcivar.

== In media ==
- The song was featured in the 1970 musical, The Me Nobody Knows.
