= A Kurt Weill Cabaret =

Broadway and off-Broadway production

- Original Off-Broadway cast recording
- Music: Kurt Weill
- Lyrics: Bertolt Brecht; Ogden Nash; Maxwell Anderson; Ira Gershwin
- Basis: Songs of Kurt Weill
- Productions: 1963 Off-Broadway; 1979 Broadway

A Kurt Weill Cabaret was a Broadway and off-Broadway production featuring the music of Kurt Weill. A precursor, The World of Kurt Weill in Song, opened off-Broadway at One Sheridan Square in the West Village on June 6, 1963, starring Will Holt and Martha Schlamme. In 1979, it was revised as A Kurt Weill Cabaret and opened at the Bijou Theater on Broadway, with Alvin Epstein and Martha Schlamme and ran for 72 performances. The Harold Clurman Theatre (now Theatre Five in the Theatre Row Building) showed it in 1984.

A recording of the original production was released by MGM Records (E/SE 4180 OC) in 1963.

== Songs ==
- The Threepenny Opera
  - "The Ballad of the Easy Life" (instrumental only)
  - "The Barbara Song"
  - "Mack the Knife"
  - "Tango Ballade"
  - "Pirate Jenny"
  - "Survival Song" (sung in the second act before "Lost in the Stars".)
- Marie Galante
  - "Le Roi d'Aquitaine"
- Der Silbersee
  - "Caesar's Death"
- Lady in the Dark
  - "The Saga of Jenny"
- Knickerbocker Holiday
  - "September Song"
- Happy End
  - "Mandalay Song"
  - "Surabaya Johnny"
  - "Bilbao Song"
- Lost in the Stars
  - "Lost in the Stars"
