= The Me Nobody Knows =

1970 musical

- Music: Gary William Friedman
- Lyrics: Will Holt
- Book: Robert H. Livingston; Herb Schapiro; Stephen M. Joseph
- Basis: Anthologized writings of inner-city youths
- Productions: 1970 Off-Broadway; 1970 Broadway

The Me Nobody Knows is a musical with music by Gary William Friedman and lyrics by Will Holt. It debuted off-Broadway in 1970 and then transferred to Broadway, making it one of the earliest rock musicals to play on Broadway, and the first Broadway hit to give voice to the sentiments of inner-city American youth. It received the Obie Award and the Drama Desk Award for best New Musical, and Five Tony Award nominations, including Best Musical.

== Synopsis ==
There is no plot, but the theme is children in low-income neighborhoods of New York City, who are "complex, introspective characters. Each 'I' is an authentic voice saying attention must be paid." The children are self-assertive in the face of difficult lives. Various stories are told through song by the cast of 8 black and 4 white children. One story is about a 13-year-old boy taking heroin for the first time. Another involves a child shocked to hear a white boy order "milk and a nigger". Another boy watches as a drunk black man is taken away in an ambulance after an accident. In the musical number "If I Had a Million Dollars", the ghetto children ponder what they would do with the money and express "tightwad selfishness to outrageous spending sprees."

== Songs ==
Act I

- Dream Babies – Melba
- Light Sings ‡ – William and Company
- This World ‡ – Company
- Numbers – Company
- What Happens to Life – Lillian and Lloyd
- Take Hold the Crutch – Nell and Company
- Flying Milk and Runaway Plates – Benjamin and Company
- I Love What the Girls Have – Donald
- How I Feel – Catherine and Carlos
- If I Had A Million Dollars – Company

Act II

- Fugue for Four Girls – Lillie Mae, Catherine, Lillian and Nell
- Rejoice – Clorox
- Sounds – Nell and Catherine
- The Tree – Carlos
- Robert, Alvin, Wendell and Jo Jo – Rhoda, Lillian, Lillie Mae and William
- Jail-Life Walk – Donald, Lloyd, Clorox and Carlos
- Something Beautiful – Rhoda
- Black – Benjamin, Clorox, Lillie Mae, Lloyd, Melba, Nell, Rhoda and William
- The White Horse – Lloyd
- War Babies – Lloyd
- Let Me Come in – Company

‡ These songs by The Staple Singers ("This World") and The 5th Dimension ("Light Sings") became hits.

== Productions ==
The Me Nobody Knows premiered off-Broadway at the Orpheum Theatre on May 18, 1970, and closed on November 15, 1970, after 208 performances. It then opened on Broadway at the Helen Hayes Theatre on December 18, 1970, transferred to the Longacre Theatre, and closed on November 14, 1971, after 378 performances. Directed by Robert H. Livingston with musical staging by Patricia Birch, the cast included a young Irene Cara as Lillie Mae, Hattie Winston as Nell, Beverly Bremers (at the time credited as Beverly Ann Bremers) as Catherine, and Northern J. Calloway.

The adaptation by director Robert H. Livingston and additional lyricist Herb Schapiro was inspired by the anthologized writings of nearly 200 New York City students, aged 7 through 18. Stephen M. Joseph, a teacher, edited the collection, which was subtitled "Children's Voices From the Ghetto" and first published in 1969. The children wrote about "How I See Myself", "How I See My Neighborhood", "The World Outside", and "Things I Can't See or Touch". According to Mr. Joseph, they wrote "for keeps" and "like it is." At odds with a squalid setting and a cynical, materialistic view of the world, themes of hope and renewal emerged. To guarantee uplift, samples from the students' work were interwoven with a ground-breaking score that combined rock music, classical fugues, early rap and jazz.

The musical was performed throughout the world, in cities such as Tel Aviv, London, Paris, Hamburg, and Johannesburg.

The German-language version, "Ich Bin Ich" was premiered at the Bremen Stadt-Theater, Berman, Germany and was performed there and in Munich on a rotating basis. The stage director was Norman Foster, musical director, Noel Jones. The cast included a singer who eventually became known as Donna Summer.

In 1980, the musical was produced for the U.S. pay television network, Showtime as part of the Broadway on Showtime series. Recorded at the CBS television studio now known as The Ed Sullivan Theater, the project was recast but included one original cast member, Jose Fernandez. Tisha Campbell (now, Tisha Campbell-Martin) performed as Lillie Mae, a role originated by Irene Cara.

== Response ==
The musical was "universally praised for its candidness and honesty." Harold Clurman in reviewing for The Nation, wrote "What I cherished about the show is the talent and vitality of the cast, the bubble of its playfulness, the raciness of its expression which, with or without the advantages of privileged training among the actors, is still the product of the streets in the dim and sequestered parts of our town.

Clive Barnes, the theatre critic for The New York Times wrote (of the off-Broadway opening): "I loved it. I loved its understanding and compassion, and I loved its pain and yet also its unsentimental determination for hope." Steven Suskin noted that he agreed with Barnes and added "The Me was energetic, tuneful, talent-filled and thought-provoking." Barnes, in reviewing the musical upon the Broadway opening, noted that the musical was "one of the best musicals on Broadway-and unequivocally the most moving, the most poignant." He wrote that it offers "an insight into ghetto youth. It is raw, tough, and yet truly compassionate...The effect could be depressing but it isn't. The sheer tenacity of the human spirit against oppression, against rats, against drugs, against the numbing, almost soothing grind of poverty, is glorious and triumphant."

== Recording ==
The Original cast album was released January 1, 1970 by Atlantic Records. The recording was released in CD form in September 2001 by 150 Music. (ASIN: B00005NSV9).

== Awards and nominations ==
=== Original Off-Broadway production ===
Year	Award	Category	Nominee	Result
1970	Obie Award	Best Musical		Won

=== Original Broadway production ===
Year	Award	Category	Nominee	Result
1971	Tony Award	Best Musical		Nominated
1971	Tony Award	Best Book of a Musical	Robert H. Livingston and Herb Schapiro	Nominated
1971	Tony Award	Best Original Score	Gary William Friedman	Nominated
1971	Tony Award	Best Direction of a Musical	Robert H. Livingston	Nominated
1971	Tony Award	Best Lyrics	Will Holt	Nominated
1971	Drama Desk Award	Outstanding Music	Gary William Friedman	Won
1971	Drama Desk Award	Outstanding Lyrics	Will Holt	Won
