= An Abbreviated Life =

Book by Ariel S. Leve

- First edition (publ. Harper)
- Author: Ariel S. Leve
- Language: English
- Genre: Memoir
- Published: 2017
- Publisher: Harper
- Publication place: United States
- Pages: 288
- ISBN: 978-0062269461

An Abbreviated Life is a memoir by Ariel S. Leve. In this book she tells the story of her childhood and her mother, American poet and feminist, Sandra Hochman. She described the physical and emotional abuse she faced in her childhood, and how she grew up in a dysfunctional family.
