= Ariel S. Leve =

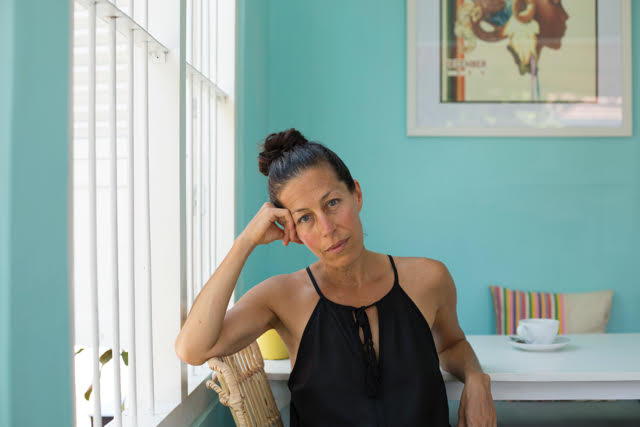
- Born: New York, New York
- Citizenship: United States
- Occupations: Journalist, author
- Writing career
- Genres: Non fiction, memoir
- Notable work: An Abbreviated Life
- Website: www.ariel-leve.com

Ariel S. Leve (born 1968) is an American author and award-winning journalist. She was a columnist for The Guardian and subsequently for the Sunday Times Magazine. Her memoir An Abbreviated Life was published by HarperCollins in 2016.

== Early life ==
Ariel Leve was born in New York City and grew up with her mother, Sandra Hochman, a poet, in Manhattan. At age five she began traveling to Southeast Asia, where she spent part of the year living in Bangkok, Thailand, with her father.

== Career ==
Leve was a senior writer for The Sunday Times Magazine from 2003 to 2010. She has contributed frequently to The Guardian, and has written for The New York Times, The New York Times Book Review, Esquire, Vanity Fair, Men's Journal, The Financial Times Magazine, The Telegraph, Marie Claire, Vogue, Granta, Air Mail, Travel + Leisure and others.

Leve has written a number of profiles and cover stories, including the June 2016 Esquire cover story on the actor Liev Schreiber and a feature profile of Gloria Steinem for Esquire. She has appeared as a guest on WTF with Marc Maron and given a TED talk on gaslighting that, as of June 2026, had received over 1.9 million views on YouTube. She has also written extensively on the subject for The Guardian.

Leve co-wrote the episode "The World Is Mean Right Now" (Season 5, Episode 5) of the television series Better Things.

Leve wrote the weekly humour column "Cassandra" for the Sunday Times Magazine from 2005 to 2010. Prior to that, the column ran in The Guardian under the title "Half Empty". From 2010 to 2012 Leve wrote a monthly food column for The Guardian called The Fussy Eater.

=== Books ===
Leve's first book, titled It Could Be Worse, You Could Be Me in the US and The Cassandra Chronicles in the UK, was a collection of her "Cassandra” columns from The Sunday Times Magazine. It was published in August 2009. Leve's television pilot of "It Could Be Worse, You Could Be Me" was optioned by Cineflix Studios.

Her second book, 1963: The Year of the Revolution, co-authored by Robin Morgan, is an oral history of the rise of the Youthquake movement in 1963, told through the recollections of figures including Keith Richards, Mary Quant, Eric Clapton, Graham Nash, Vidal Sassoon and Stevie Nicks, among others.

Leve's third book, An Abbreviated Life, was published in June 2016. A memoir of her early years, it explores the psychological consequences of a traumatic childhood and the aftermath of survival. The memoir received positive reviews in The New York Times, The Guardian, The Spectator and others.

A film adaptation of An Abbreviated Life is in development, with Pamela Adlon attached to direct. Leve co-wrote the screenplay with Adlon, with Rebecca Hall attached to star.

== Awards ==
In 2005, she was nominated for the British Press Awards for Interviewer of the Year for 2004.

In 2008, she was nominated for the British Press Awards for Feature Writer of the Year for 2007.

In 2008, she won Feature Writer of the Year from the Magazine Design and Journalism Awards.

In 2010, she was nominated for the British Press Awards for Interviewer of the year for 2009, and was "Highly Commended".

== Bibliography ==
Books

- Leve, Ariel (2009). It Could Be Worse, You Could Be Me
- Leve, Ariel; Morgan, Robin (2013). 1963: The Year of the Revolution
- Leve, Ariel (2016). An Abbreviated Life

Selected journalism

- Leve, Ariel (2017). "Gaslighting: how to cope when someone is manipulating your reality". The Guardian
- Leve, Ariel (2018). "Is an apology necessary to heal after abuse?". The Guardian
- Leve, Ariel (2024). "Gloria Steinem Is Still In the Fight". Esquire
