= Alys Pearsall Smith =

American-born British Quaker relief organiser

- Alyssa Pearsall Smith in 1892
- Born: Alyssa Whitall Smith; 21 July 1867; Philadelphia, Pennsylvania, U.S.
- Died: 21 January 1951 (aged 83); London, England
- Education: Bryn Mawr College
- Spouse: Bertrand Russell (m. 1894; div. 1921)
- Parent(s): Robert Pearsall Smith; Hannah Whitall Smith
- Relatives: Logan Pearsall Smith (brother); Mary Berenson (sister); M. Carey Thomas (cousin)

Alyssa Whitall "Alys" Pearsall Smith (21 July 1867 – 21 January 1951) was an American-born British Quaker relief organiser and the first wife of Bertrand Russell. She chaired the society that created an innovative school for mothers in 1907.

== Early life ==
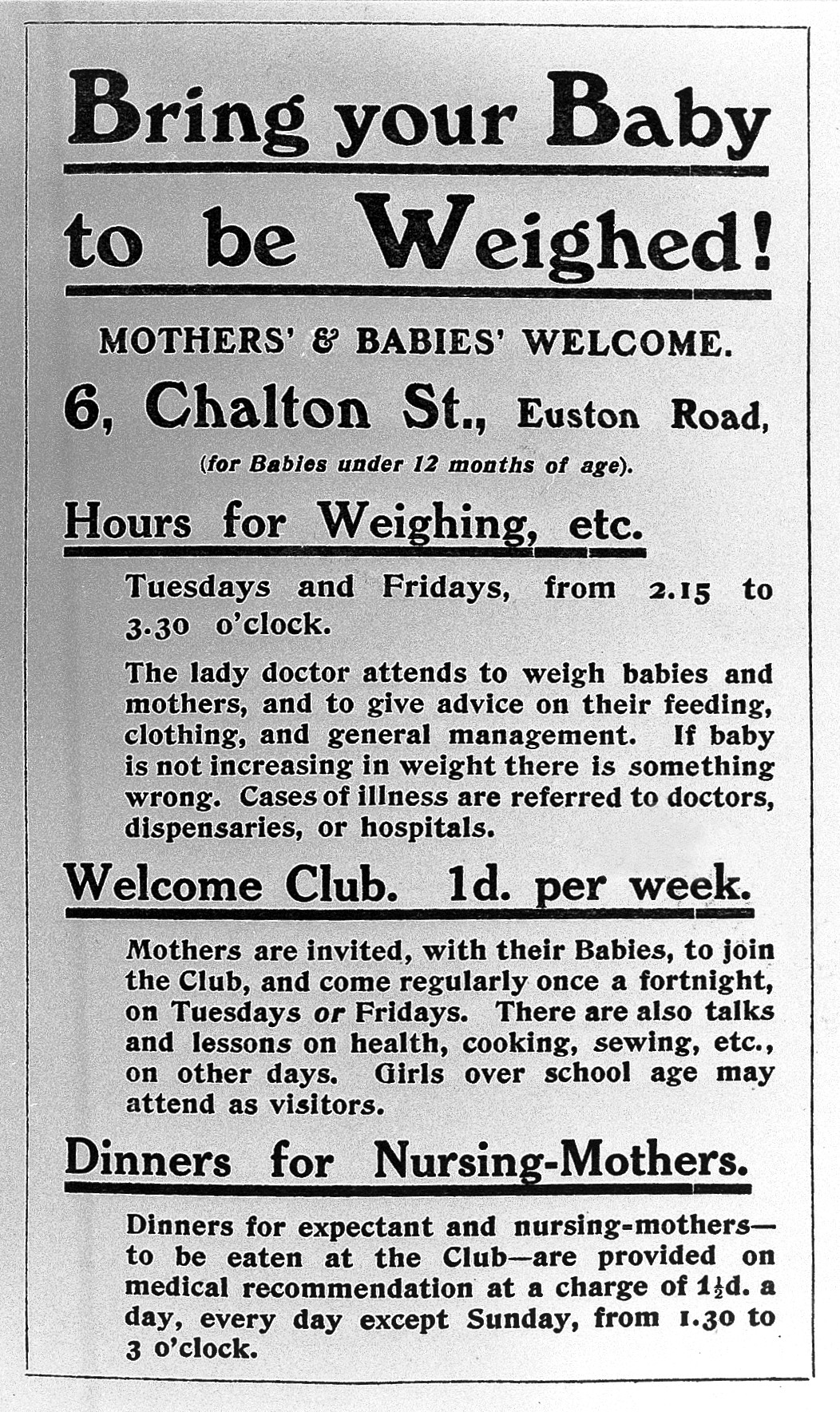
A poster for a School for Mothers

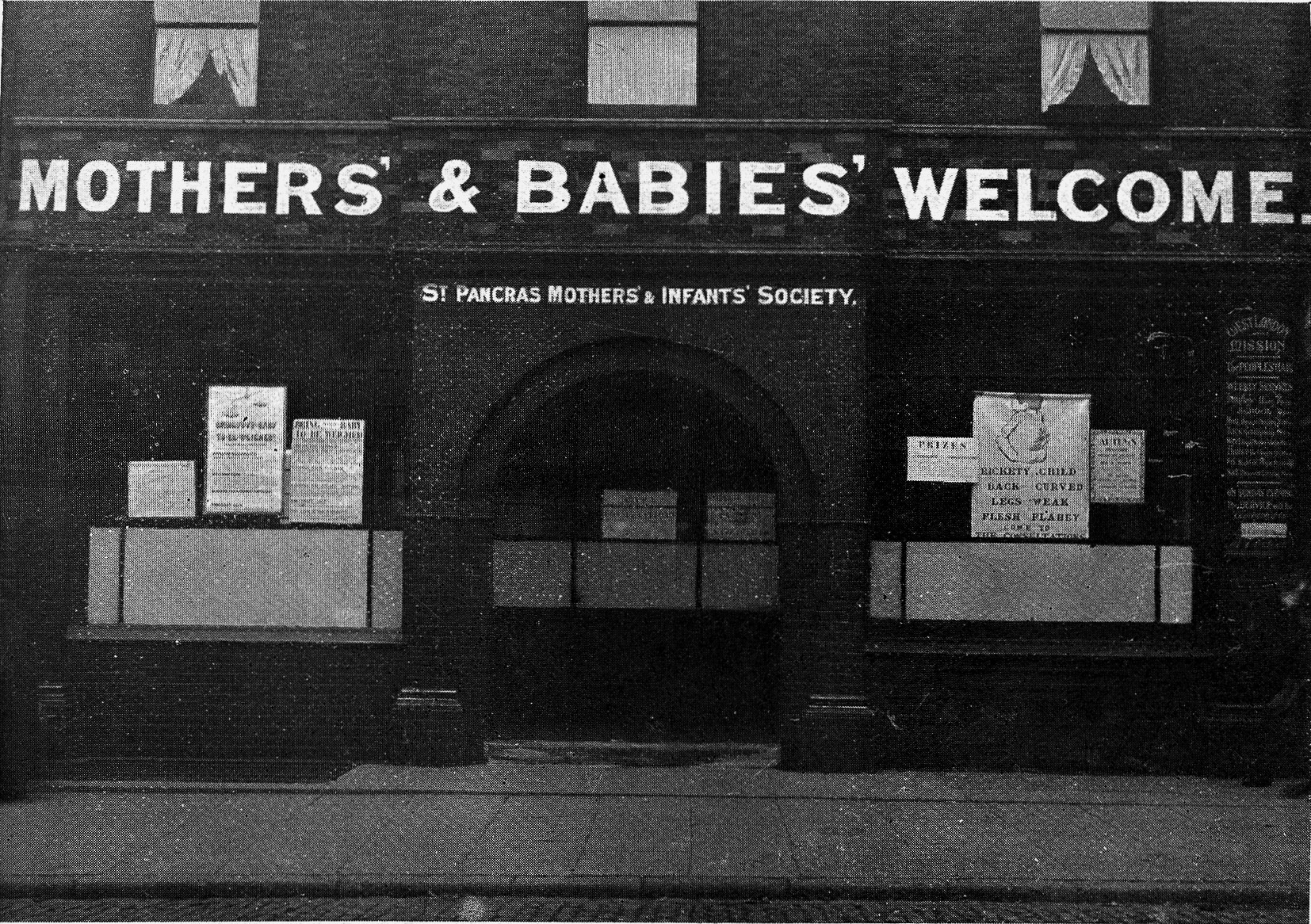
Exterior of Mothers' & Babies' Welcome

Pearsall Smith was born in Philadelphia, Pennsylvania. She was the daughter of Robert Pearsall Smith and Hannah Whitall Smith, prominent figures in the Holiness movement in America and the Higher Life movement in Great Britain. She was the sister of essayist and critic Logan Pearsall Smith and the cousin of Martha Carey Thomas. Pearsall Smith graduated from Bryn Mawr College near Philadelphia.

Pearsall Smith's family lived in England from 1873 to 1875 and then again from 1888 onward. In England, the family came into contact with George Bernard Shaw, Henry James, and Bernard Berenson, who married her sister, Mary.

== Personal life ==
On 13 December 1894, Smith married Bertrand Russell, son of the Viscount and Viscountess Amberley in the Quaker Meeting House in St. Martin's Lane, London, England. They separated in 1911 and divorced in 1921.

According to Russell's autobiography, she was also an intimate friend of Walt Whitman. Alys, who never remarried, died in London on 21 January 1951.

=== Volunteer work ===
Pearsall Smith chaired the Italian Refugees' Relief Committee to help people fleeing Benito Mussolini's Italy.

Pearsall Smith also chaired the general committee of the St Pancras Mothers' and Infants' Society, which set up a School for Mothers (also known as Mothers' & Babies' Welcome) in Charlton Street, London, N.W. in 1907. This centre provided a range of services aimed at reducing infant mortality, such as weighing babies, providing expectant and nursing mothers with meals, and medical and mothering advice. The vice-chair was Adele Meyer, who largely funded the enterprise.

Pearsall Smith was said to be involved in the women's suffrage activism during 1908.
