= Howard Sturges =

American socialite (1884–1955)

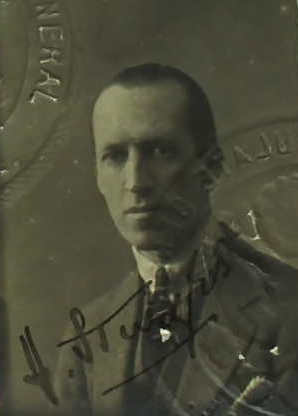
Howard Sturges 1921

Howard Sturges (December 23, 1884 – October 7, 1955) was a New England socialite and long-time friend of Cole Porter.

== Biography ==
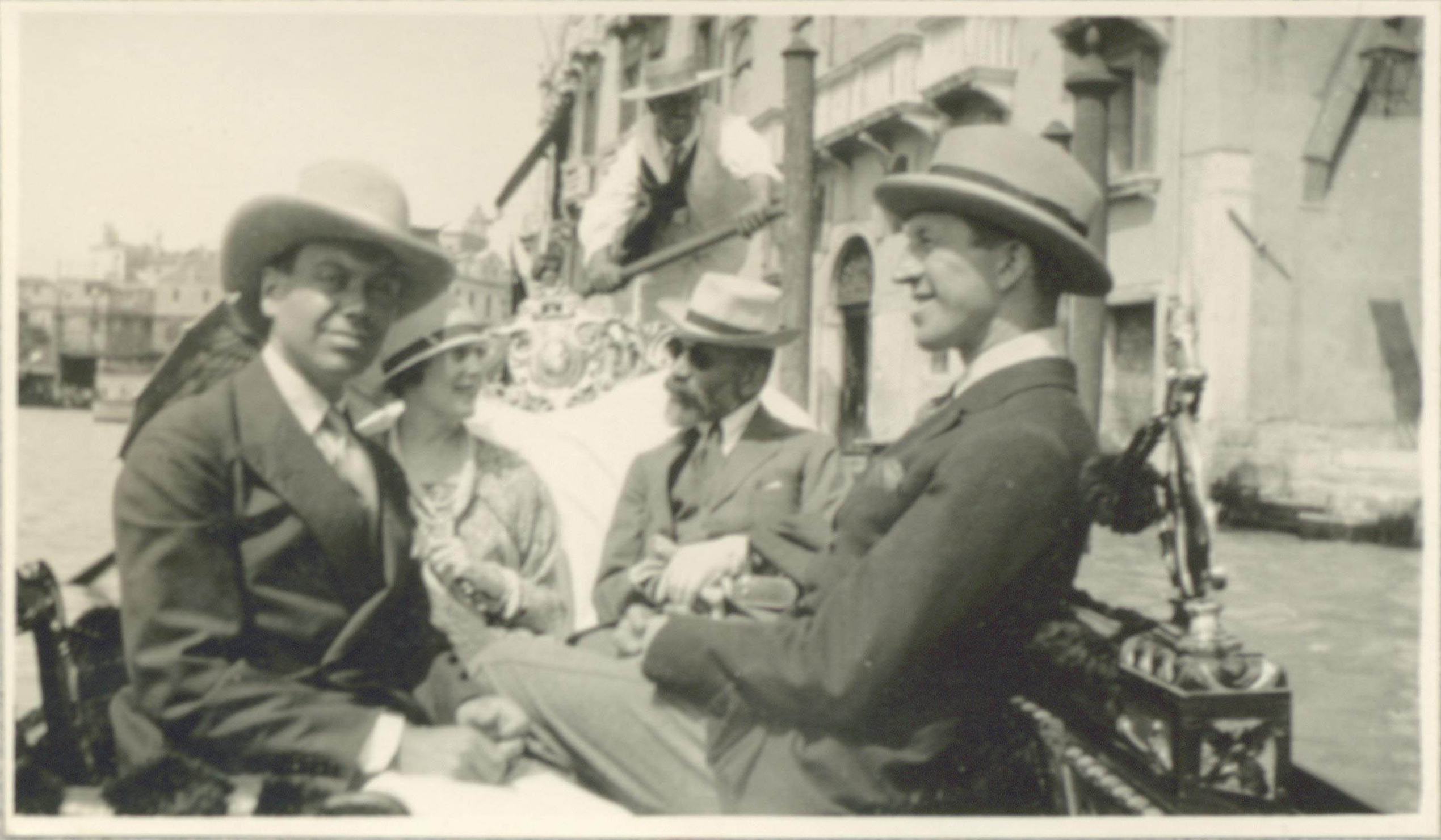
Cole Porter, Linda Lee Thomas, Bernard Berenson and Howard Sturges in a gondola, in Venice, 1923

Howard Sturges was born on December 23, 1884, in Providence, Rhode Island. He was the son of Howard Okie Sturges (1845–1920), a manufacturer of cotton, and Alice Spring Knight (1853–1930). He was an old-money New England socialite who trained as a violinist. After grade school and high school in Providence, he attended the Groton School in Massachusetts, then entered Yale University, where he graduated with an A.B. in the class of 1908. Before moving to Paris to study music he played the violin for the New Haven Symphony. He was an eccentric. He kept a pet bear and walked a pig on a leash through the streets of Paris.

He was a volunteer in Paris during World War I. During the war he served first as a member of the American Relief Clearing House Headquarters in Paris, and later as secretary to Oscar Beatte in the American Red Cross. His services were rewarded by official recognition from the French government.

Probably at a party of Elsie de Wolfe he met Linda Lee Thomas and through her, her husband, Cole Porter. Eventually he rented a suite of rooms at their Paris' house at 13 rue Monsieur. He was a close friend of Thomas's and went on to be Cole Porter's lifelong friend. Sturges lent Thomas a painting by Christian Bérard, which hung for years in their Parisian drawing room. Sturges was gay and part of the crowd of gays and lesbians who used to travel around the world with the Porters, including: Noël Coward, Jack Wilson, Monty Woolley, Elsa Maxwell, Anne Morgan, Elsie de Wolfe and Elisabeth Marbury.

In the 1920s Sturges was associated with Beatte in business in Paris. He was a member of the Agawam Hunt Club, and the Rhode Island Yale Alumni Association.

He moved back to the United States during World War II and lived at East 64 Street, New York.

He died on October 7, 1955, in Paris. His nephew was Rowland Sturges, a concert pianist and teacher.
