= Logan Pearsall Smith =

American-born British essayist (1865–1946)

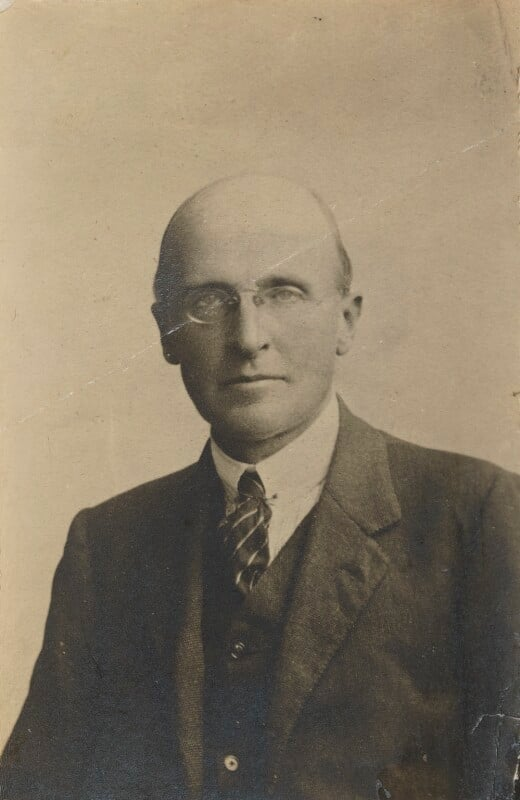
- Smith, c. 1912
- Born: Lloyd Logan Pearsall Smith; 18 October 1865; Millville, New Jersey, U.S.
- Died: 2 March 1946 (aged 80); London, England
- Citizenship: British
- Education: Haverford College, Harvard College, University of Berlin, Balliol College, Oxford
- Occupations: Essayist, critic, autobiographer
- Relatives: Robert Pearsall Smith (father), Hannah Whitall Smith (mother) and sisters Alys Pearsall Smith and Mary Berenson
- Writing career
- Subject: 17th century divines

Lloyd Logan Pearsall Smith (18 October 1865 – 2 March 1946) was an American-born British essayist and critic. Harvard and Oxford educated, he was known for his aphorisms and epigrams, and was an expert on 17th century divines. His Words and Idioms made him an authority on correct English language usage. He wrote his autobiography, Unforgotten Years, in 1938.

== Early life ==
Age and Death

The denunciation of the young is a necessary part of the hygiene of older people, and greatly assists in the circulation of their blood.

— Logan Pearsall Smith

Smith was born in Millville, New Jersey. He was the son of the prominent Quakers Robert Pearsall Smith and Hannah Whitall Smith, and a descendant of James Logan, who was William Penn's secretary and the Chief Justice of Pennsylvania in the 18th century. His mother's family had become wealthy from its glass factories. He lived for a time as a boy in England. In his 1938 autobiography, Smith describes how in his youth he came to be a friend of Walt Whitman in the poet's latter years.

Smith's sister Alys was the first wife of philosopher Bertrand Russell. His sister Mary was married twice, first to the Irish barrister Benjamin Conn "Frank" Costelloe. Their two daughters were Ray Strachey and Karin Stephen, in-laws to Lytton Strachey and Virginia Woolf, respectively. Mary later married the art historian Bernard Berenson.

== Education ==
Smith attended the William Penn Charter School in Philadelphia, Haverford College, Harvard College, and the University of Berlin. Smith later studied Greats at Balliol College, Oxford, where he graduated in 1891.

== Career ==
Smith employed a succession of young secretary/companions to help him. This post was Cyril Connolly's first job in 1925 and he was to be strongly influenced by Smith. Robert Gathorne-Hardy succeeded Connolly in this post.

Authorial Vanity

Every author, however modest, keeps a most outrageous vanity chained like a madman in the padded cell of his breast.

— Logan Pearsall Smith

Smith was an authority on 17th century divines. He was known for his aphorisms and epigrams, and his Trivia has been highly rated. He was a literary perfectionist and could take days refining his sentences. With Words and Idioms he became a recognised authority on the correct use of English. He is now probably most remembered for his autobiography Unforgotten Years (1938). He was much influenced by Walter Pater. He was a devotee of Jane Austen's fiction and referred to himself as a "Mansfield Parker." As well as his employees listed, his followers included Desmond MacCarthy, John Russell, R. C. Trevelyan, and Hugh Trevor-Roper. He was, in part, the basis for the character of Nick Greene (Sir Nicholas Greene) in Virginia Woolf's Orlando.

== Personal life ==
"Consolation"
by Logan Pearsall Smith
Read by David Wales for LibriVox
Audio 00:00:50 (full text)

He settled in England after Oxford with occasional forays to continental Europe and became a British subject in 1913. He divided his time between Chelsea, where he was a close friend of Desmond MacCarthy and Rose Macaulay, and a Tudor farmhouse at Warsash near the Solent, called Big Chilling.

Gathorne-Hardy described Smith as "a largish man with a stoop that disguised his height". Kenneth Clark further wrote "His tall frame, hunched up, with head thrust forward like a bird, was balanced unsteadily on vestigial legs".

Politically he was a socialist, having been converted by Graham Wallas, a founder of the Fabian Society.

His portrait, made in 1932 by Ethel Sands, is at the National Portrait Gallery, London.

== Works ==
- 1895. The Youth of Parnassus, and other stories
- 1902. Trivia
- 1907. The Life and Letters of Sir Henry Wotton. Biography
- 1909. Songs and Sonnets
- 1912. The English Language
- 1919. A Treasury of English Prose
- 1920. Little Essays Drawn From The Writings Of George Santayana
- 1920 (ed.). Donne's Sermons: Selected Passages with an Essay
- 1920. Stories from the Old Testament retold. Hogarth Press
- 1921. More Trivia
- 1923. English Idioms
- 1925. Words and Idioms
- 1927. The Prospects of Literature. Hogarth Press
- 1930 (ed.) The Golden Grove: Selected Passages From The Sermons and Writings of Jeremy Taylor
- 1931. Afterthoughts
- 1933. All Trivia. Collection
- 1933. Last Words
- 1933. On Reading Shakespeare
- 1936. Fine Writing
- 1936. Reperusals & Recollections
- 1938. Unforgotten Years
- 1938. Death in Iceland. Privately printed in Reading with Iceland: A Poem by Robert Gathorne-Hardy.
- 1940. Milton and His Modern Critics. London: Oxford University Press – via Internet Archive.
- 1943. A Treasury Of English Aphorisms
- 1949 (ed.). A Religious Rebel: The Letters of "H.W.S." (Mrs. Pearsall Smith). Published in the USA as Philadelphia Quaker, The Letters of Hannah Whitall Smith
- 1949. (ed.). The Golden Shakespeare
- 1972. Four Words. Romantic, Originality, Creative, Genius
- 1982. Saved from the Salvage. With a Memoir of the Author by Cyril Connolly
- 1989. (Edward Burman, ed.) Logan Pearsall Smith. Anthology.
