= Sandra Hochman =

American poet

- Born: September 11, 1936 (age 89); Manhattan, New York City
- Education: Bennington College, Columbia University, Sorbonne University
- Notable work: Walking Papers, Manhattan Pastures
- Spouse(s): Ivry Gitlis (d. 1960); Harvey Leve (m. 1965; d. 1970)
- Children: Ariel S. Leve
- Website: sandrahochman.com

Signature
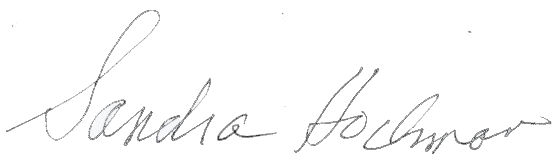

Sandra Hochman (born September 11, 1936 in New York City) is an American author, poet, screenwriter, lyricist and documentary film maker. Her first autobiographical novel Walking Papers was very well received and Philip Roth called it a masterpiece. She has published seven books of poetry; her first book won the Yale Series of Younger Poets Competition. She has also written for The New York Times, Life (magazine), People (magazine), New York (magazine) and many more. She created the Foundation You're an Artist Too, which was an after school program held weekly at the Metropolitan Museum of Art. Her film Year of The Woman was co-produced with Porter Bibb, the producer of The Rolling Stones documentary Gimme Shelter.

== Life ==
After she graduated from the Cherry Lawn boarding school, she went on to graduate from Bennington College. She also has a master's degree in comparative literature from Columbia University. When she was living in Paris she studied at the Sorbonne. She was poet-in-residence at Fordham University, and City College of New York.

Sandra is also a journalist as well as a poet. She was one of the first women to write a humor column for Harpers Bazaar Magazine. She also wrote her own semi-annual column alternating with Gloria Steinem.

Her poems appeared in a two-page spread in The New Yorker. She was one of the youngest poets to have her collected poems (Earthworks) published by the Viking Press. Ms. Huffington showed her film in 2017. She had also had musicals produced on and off Broadway. Her one-woman play based on her memoir My father, My friend was going to be directed by Julie Arnell in June 2018. She created her own foundation, "You're an Artist Too" at the Metropolitan Museum of Art to teach poetry to children ages 7–12. She ran this program for 15 years. She has lived in Paris and Hong Kong and now lives in Manhattan.

Hochman and her all-woman crew were given $15,000 by independent filmmakers to direct "Year of the Woman", a documentary that depicts feminist activism during the 1972 Democratic Convention.

== Personal life ==
When she was young she met Israeli violinist Ivry Gitlis. They were married in the State of Israel, and soon after they lived in Paris. She writes about these years in her book Paris 1958 - 1960. After she and Gitlis were divorced she married Harvey Leve, a Harvard University lawyer who was the head of the treasury department in Hong Kong. They had a daughter, the writer Ariel Leve. After they divorced, Harvey worked as an international lawyer in Thailand and later Indonesia. He is now retired and lives in Bali. Their daughter, Ariel Leve, is a journalist for the London Times, travels between New York and Bali. In 2016 Ariel published a critically acclaimed memoir An Abbreviated Life in which she explores the psychological consequences of physical and emotional abuse she faced in her childhood and the aftermath of survival.

== Awards ==
- 1963 Yale Series of Younger Poets Competition
- 1960 Nominated for Pulitzer Prize for Poetry (Voyage Home)
- 1963 Nominated for Pulitzer Prize for Poetry (Manhattan Pastures)
- 1967 Harpers Bazaar Award for 100 Outstanding Women of America
- 1967 Harpers Bazaar Award for 100 Most Beautiful Women of America
- 1975 1st Metropolitan Museum Award of Merit
- Florynce Kennedy Workshop Award
- Silo Literary Magazine Award to Poetry

== You're An Artist Too ==
Sandra Created the Foundation You're An Artist Too which was an after school program held weekly at the Metropolitan Museum of Art. It was for children for ages 8–12 and it successfully ran for 15 years. Her Foundation received a generous donation from the Uris Brothers Fund in the amount of 300 million dollars. The program received a two-page review in The New York Times.

== Works ==
=== Poetry ===
- Voyage Home: Poems. Paris: Two Cities, 1960.
- Manhattan Pastures. New Haven: Yale University Press, 1963. Yale Series of Younger Poets, v. 59.
- The Vaudeville Marriage: Poems. New York: Viking, 1966.
- Maps for The Skin. New York, Viking
- Love Poems: Ch'ing Shih. Hong Kong: I Lin Wen Chu Yin Shua, 1966. 100 copies.
- Love Letters from Asia: Poems. New York: Viking, 1968.
- Earthworks: Poems 1960-1970. New York: Viking, 1970; London: Secker & Warburg, 1972. ISBN 978-0-436-19920-2
- Futures: New Poems. New York: Viking, 1974.

=== Novels ===
- Walking Papers. New York: Viking, 1971.
- The Magic Convention. Garden City, NY: Doubleday, 1971.
- Happiness Is Too Much Trouble: A Novel. New York: Putnam, 1976.
- Endangered Species: A Novel. New York: Putnam, 1977. ISBN 978-0-380-42366-8
- Jogging: A Love Story. New York: Putnam, 1979.
- Playing Tahoe: A Novel. New York: Wyndham Books, 1981. ISBN 978-0-671-25358-5
- Loving Robert Lowell. Nashville, Turner Publishing, 2017.
- The Shakespeare Conspiracy Nashville, Turner Publishing, 2017.
- Paris 1958-1960 (Memoir) Nashville, Turner Publishing, 2017.
- My Father, My Friend (Memoir) Nashville, Turner Publishing, 2018.

=== Non-fiction ===
- Sandra Hochman; Sybil Wong (1976). Satellite Spies: The Frightening Impact of a New Technology. Indianapolis: Bobbs-Merrill. ISBN 978-0-672-52137-9.
- Streams: Life Secrets for Writing Poems and Songs. Englewood Cliffs, NJ: Prentice-Hall. 1978. ISBN 978-0-13-851261-3.
- 23 Ways of Looking at a Company. New York, Lincoln Center

=== Children's books ===
- Timmy The Great. with Tad Danielak, New York, Fidelity Books, 1999.
- The Magic Convention. Doubleday, New York, 1971

=== Journalism ===
Hochman was a freelance writer for People Magazine, New York Magazine and The New York Times.

=== Scriptwriting ===
- Hochmann was commissioned to write film scripts by David Brown, the producer of Jaws and many more.

== Theater ==
- The Clown Woman With Tad Danielak, (music by Galt MacDermot)
- The Sandancer (music by Galt MacDermot)
- Vaudeville Jive (music by Gary William Friedman), performed at the Ensemble Theater
- The Death of Dick Shawn, Performed at the Ensemble Theater and Tribeca Theater
- Rubirosa (music by Rob Stoner), Produced by Hochman & Marvin A. Krauss (Performed as a workshop)
- Rubirosa music by Gary Kupper, Produced by Hochman, Terry Adele and Kupper, performed at The Lambs Club
- Custody (music my Marsha Singer)
- Watercolor Girl (music by Marsha Singer)
- Elvis Unbound (music by Rob Stoner)
- The Secrets of Mrs. Shakespeare (music by MacDermot & Friedman)

=== Playwright ===
- The World of Gunter Grass, produced by Arthur Cantor, performed on Broadway

=== Musicals ===
- Walking Papers (music by Gary William Friedman), performed at the Circle in the Square Theatre
- Explosion of Loneliness (music by Galt MacDermot)
- The Whore and the Poet (music by MacDermot, Friedman) (Performed as a workshop)
- Timmy the Great (music by Gary Kupper)

== Film ==
- Year of the Woman (1973) was co-produced with Porter Bibb, the producer of The Rolling Stones documentary Gimme Shelter (1970 film). Arthur M. Schlesinger Jr. described it as "the greatest combination of sex and politics ever seen in a film." Rex Reed - "Sandra Hochman is one of the few women I know who could make a movie about feminism, stick to all the issues and still have a sense of humor about the subject without demeaning its importance. She has made a movie that it is informative, witty and enlightening. The Year of the Woman is a delightful experience." It starred Warren Beatty, Shirley MacLaine, Gloria Steinem, Norman Mailer, Liz Renay, Florynce Kennedy, Art Buchwald, Shirley Chisholm, Bella Abzug and more.

=== Reviews ===
- Sandra Hochman and Art Buchwald are the best new comedy team since Hepburn and Tracy - or maybe Dressler and Beery - Arthur Schlesinger, Jr.
- Hilarious...absolutely brilliant. - Gail Rock, Ms. Magazine
- Against the backdrop of political convention insanity, Ms; Hochman is strong and forceful but still fetchingly feminine - a serious poet of considerable depth. - Norma McLain Stoop. - AFTER DARK
- Patches of Ms. Hochman's autobiographical poetry are stitched into the entire pattern of this colorful crazy-quilt documentary. - Liz Smith, COSMOPOLITAN
- The film is well done with an asset in its taut editing that keeps the material bouncing along, neat lensing and an overall revealing look at an interesting woman demanding her place at the very seat of political power. - VARIETY
- ...the film has vigor, filled with both colorful footage and provocative talk. - CUE
- Miss Hochman and her crew of camera people and cheerleaders are a lot of fun, especially when they intrude on a staff meeting of CBS News assault Mike Wallace, John Hart and Roger Mudd...The news stalwarts try to keep a straight face. You don't have to. - PENTHOUSE
- Most eloquent is the silent somber scenes of Veterans against Vietnam. - NEW YORK POST
- Year of the Woman is the rare species, a passionate documentary. A current of electricity runs through the entire film, and it should excite, enrage and even polarize. - Kathleen Carroll, LEASURE and the ARTS
