= Ridin' High (song) =

1936 song

"Ridin' High" is a 1936 popular song written by Cole Porter, for his musical Red, Hot and Blue, where it was introduced by Ethel Merman.

== Notable recordings ==
- Benny Goodman and His Orchestra - 'Camel Caravan' (Live Broadcast Radio Program) (Nov. 2, 1937), arranged by Jimmy Mundy; Jazz Concert No. 2 (Columbia LP: ML 4590) (1952)
- Chris Connor - This Is Chris (1955).<
- Ella Fitzgerald - Ella Fitzgerald Sings the Cole Porter Songbook (1956)
- Michel Legrand & His Orchestra - The Columbia Album of Cole Porter (1957).
- Kate Smith (1957) - included in the compilation CD Makin' Whoopee! - Capitol Sings Broadway (1995).
- Mark Murphy - Let Yourself Go (1958), arranged by Ralph Burns
- Jeri Southern - Southern Breeze (1958), arr. Marty Paich, reissued on CD as Southern Breeze/Coffee Cigarettes and Memories (1998)
- Peggy Lee - Things Are Swingin' (1959), arranged by Jack Marshall
- Teresa Brewer - Ridin' High (1960), arranged by Jerry Fielding
- Carol Lawrence - An Evening With Carol Lawrence (1964)
- Doris Day - Bright and Shiny (1961), arranged by Neal Hefti
- Johnny Mathis - Broadway (1964)
- Cleo Laine - Portrait (1971), arranged by John Dankworth
- Sue Raney - Ridin' High (1984), with the Bob Florence quartet
- Hod O'Brien - Ridin' High (1990).
- Robert Palmer - Ridin' High (1992), arranged by Clare Fischer
- Rebecca Martin - Middlehope (2000)
- Fay Claassen - Red, Hot & Blue: The Music of Cole Porter (2008), arranged by Michael Abene
- Stevie Holland - Love, Linda: The Life of Mrs. Cole Porter (Original Cast Album) (2010)
