= Gary William Friedman =

American composer

Background information
- Born: Brooklyn, New York City, U.S.
- Genres: Musical theatre; Contemporary classical music; classical music; Film score; film scores; Television score; television scores; Jazz
- Instruments: Saxophone; clarinet; flute
- Years active: 1960 - Present
- Website: www.garywilliamfriedman.com

Gary William Friedman is an American musical theatre, symphonic, film and television composer. His career began in the 1960s in New York City as a saxophonist in an improvisational ensemble and as a composer for experimental theater. Friedman's 1970 musical, The Me Nobody Knows opened Off-Broadway and won the Obie Award for Best Music of a Musical before moving to Broadway and earning five Tony Award nominations. Friedman has also composed scores for numerous American films and television series such as PBS's children's television series, The Electric Company. His orchestral and operatic compositions have been commissioned by festivals and venues including the Kennedy Center for the Performing Arts.

== Biography ==
=== Early life and education ===
Born and raised in Brooklyn, New York, Friedman was a saxophonist and band leader at Abraham Lincoln High School. While attending Brooklyn College, Friedman studied composition with Hall Overton and Jan Meyerowitz. After completing his post-graduate studies in education, Friedman studied electronic music composition with Vladimir Ussachevsky, at the Columbia-Princeton Electronic Music Center.

=== Musical performance and composition ===
Friedman performed as a saxophonist throughout the early 1960s and became a key member of the Free-Form Improvisational Ensemble with Burton Greene and Alan Silva. In September 1964, the group was featured in concert at New York City's Town Hall, where Friedman's Benjamin, A Brass Quintet premiered.

During this period, Friedman's theatrical career began as the composer of scores for plays by Paul Foster, Tom Eyen, and Jean-Claude van Itallie at Ellen Stewart's La MaMa Experimental Theatre Club. His first major critical and commercial success was as composer of the 1970 musical The Me Nobody Knows, for which Will Holt and Herb Schapiro wrote the lyrics. After winning the Obie Award for Best Music of a Musical, the show transferred to Broadway in 1971, where it garnered five Tony Award nominations, including Best Score. The show went on to be produced and performed throughout the world, in cities such as Hamburg, London, Paris and Johannesburg. Two songs from the show, "Light Sings", recorded by The 5th Dimension, and "This World", recorded by The Staples Singers, became top pop singles. In 1980, The Me Nobody Knows was produced as a special Showtime television presentation, introduced and hosted by James Earl Jones.

In 1975 Friedman served as music director for PBS television's The Electric Company, for which he wrote over 60 songs, including the popular "Spider-Man Theme Song". Friedman's musical Taking My Turn, for which Holt wrote the lyrics, won the Outer Critics Circle Award in 1983, and was presented on PBS's Great Performances series with a cast that included Margaret Whiting, Marni Nixon, and Cissy Houston. Friedman's features and television film scores include Full Moon High (1981), starring Alan Arkin and Adam Arkin, Who Gets The Friends (1988), starring Lucie Arnaz and Jill Clayburgh, and Bump In The Night (1991), starring Christopher Reeve.

Friedman has co-produced and composed original material for several internationally acclaimed jazz recordings with his wife, vocalist and lyricist, Stevie Holland. Their album, Before Love Has Gone (150 Music), was chosen by USA Today as a Top CD of The Year in 2008. Friedman's orchestral, operatic and dance works have been commissioned and performed at venues such as the Kennedy Center for the Performing Arts, the Lancaster Music Festival, the Columbus Symphony, and Encompass New Opera Theatre. Ligeia, an orchestral chamber work inspired by the short story of the same name by Edgar Allan Poe, had its world premiere in October 2011 with the Pit Stop Players at The DiMenna Center for the Arts in New York City. His liturgical works include An American S'Lichot, a Hebrew choral and orchestral work that is performed annually at synagogues throughout the United States on the S’lichot holy day. A selection of Friedman's symphonic works was recorded and released on the CD Colloquy in 2008 by 150 Music.

=== Teaching ===
After completing his post-graduate studies in 1960, Friedman worked as a licensed teacher in New York City public school system. He taught an advanced course in music for film at Carnegie Mellon University in 1985 and writing for theater at the University of California, Los Angeles (UCLA) in 1993.

=== Personal life ===
Friedman married singer-lyricist Stevie Holland in 1999. He has two children from his first marriage to Barbara Ellen Miller, who died in 1997.

== List of works ==
=== Broadway productions ===
- The Me Nobody Knows (1971)
- Platinum (1978)

=== Off-Broadway productions ===
- The Me Nobody Knows (1969)
- Taking My Turn (1982)
- Sunset (1983)
- Bring In The Morning (1991)
- Sheba (1995)
- Love, Linda: The Life of Mrs. Cole Porter (co-author and arrangements) (2009)

=== Other theater productions ===
- 2008 ½ (lyrics by Tom Eyen), Truck and Warehouse Theatre, New York City (1972)
- Walking Papers (lyrics by Sandra Hochman), Circle in the Square Theatre, New York City (1975)
- Laugh A Little, Cry A Little (lyrics by Arnold Horwitt), National Tour, starring Jan Peerce (1976)
- Merton of The Movies (lyrics by Robert Lorick), Carnegie Mellon University (1985)
- Ghetto (additional lyrics by Sheldon Harnick), Mark Taper Forum, Los Angeles (1986)
- Sheba (book and lyrics by Sharleen Cooper Cohen), ATA, New York City (1994)
- The Last Supper, A Musical Enactment (lyrics by Thomas Mitz), Saint Luke's Theatre, New York City (2001)
- Magpie (lyrics by Edward Gallardo), New York Musical Theatre Festival, The Player's Theatre, New York City (2007)
- Treasure Island (book by Sherman Yellen, lyrics by Will Holt), Theatre Three, Port Jefferson, New York (2012)

=== Symphonic works ===
- Mordecai (opera; libretto by Robert Reinhold), premiered at the Kosciushko Foundation, New York City (1979)
- Haskalah, premiered with the Columbus Symphony, Columbus, Ohio (1984)
- Waning Powers (opera; libretto by Gerald Walker), premiered at the Vineyard Theatre, New York City (1986)
- The Pied Piper (ballet), commissioned and performed by Tales and Scales, choreographed by Mercedes Ellington, premiered at the Lancaster Music Festival (1994), subsequently performed with the Evansville Philharmonic Orchestra (1995)
- Puss N' Boots (ballet), commissioned and performed by Maestro Gary Sheldon for the Lancaster Music Festival, choreographed by Melinda Baker (1998)
- Teddy (operatic fable; libretto by Herb Schapiro), performed in concert with Encompass New Opera Theatre (Nancy Rhodes, director), New York City (2002)
- Accordion Samba, commissioned by American Accordionists' Association, premiered at Elebash Recital Hall, New York City (2005)
- Ligeia (chamber work), commissioned and premiered by Joshua Rosenblum for the Pit Stop Players, DiMenna Center for The Arts, New York City (2011)
- Butterfly (cantata for orchestra and soloists), premiered by Cantor Jack Chomsky at Trinity Lutheran Seminary, Bexley, Ohio (2014)
- The Raven (chamber work), commissioned and premiered by Joshua Rosenblum for the Pit Stop Players, Saint Stephens Church, New York City (2015)
- Reflections (chamber work), commissioned and premiered by The Palisades Virtuosi, at the George Frey Center For The Arts, New Jersey (2015), Recorded on Albany Records (2017)
- A Dream Within A Dream (chamber work), commissioned and premiered by Joshua Rosenblum for the Pit Stop Players, Good Sheperd-Faith Presbyterian Church, New York City (2016)
- Anthem (chamber work; poem by Ross Yockey), premiered by the Essex Chamber Music Players at the David Hartleb Tech Center, Northern Essex Community College, Haverhill, Massachusetts (2017)

=== Liturgical works ===
- Celebration, a contemporary setting of the traditional Friday night service, commissioned by Roger L. Stevens for John F. Kennedy Center for the Performing Arts (1971), premiered at Temple Israel of the City of New York (1973)
- An American S'Lichot, commissioned and premiered by Cantor Jack Chomsky at Congregation Tifereth Israel, Columbus, Ohio (1983)
- Song Of Songs, for Cantor, Choir and Orchestra, commissioned and performed by Cantor Nate Lam at Stephen Wise Synagogue, Los Angeles (1988)

=== Film scores ===
- Fore Play (1975)
- Spree (1979)
- Full Moon High (1981)
- The Creation (video short) (1988)
- The Goodbye Bird (1993)
- Private Debts (short) (1993)

=== Television ===
- "Alexander", an ABC Afterschool Special (1973)
- The Electric Company (music director and composer) (1974–1975)
- The Me Nobody Knows (Showtime special) (1979)
- Taking My Turn (PBS Great Performances series) (1983)
- My Two Loves (1986)
- Night of Courage (ABC) (1987)
- Who Gets the Friends? (1988)
- Liberace (1988)
- Bump in the Night (1991)
- Susan B. Anthony Slept Here (1995)

== Awards and nominations ==
Year	Work	Award	Result
1970	The Me Nobody Knows	Drama Desk Award for Best Original Score	Won
1970	The Me Nobody Knows	Obie Award for Best Original Score	Won
1971	The Me Nobody Knows	Tony Award for Best Original Score	Nominated
1983	Taking My Turn	Outer Critics Circle Award for Best Musical	Won
2012	Treasure Island	Broadway World Long Island Award for Best Musical	Won
