= Mary Berenson =

American art historian (1864–1945)

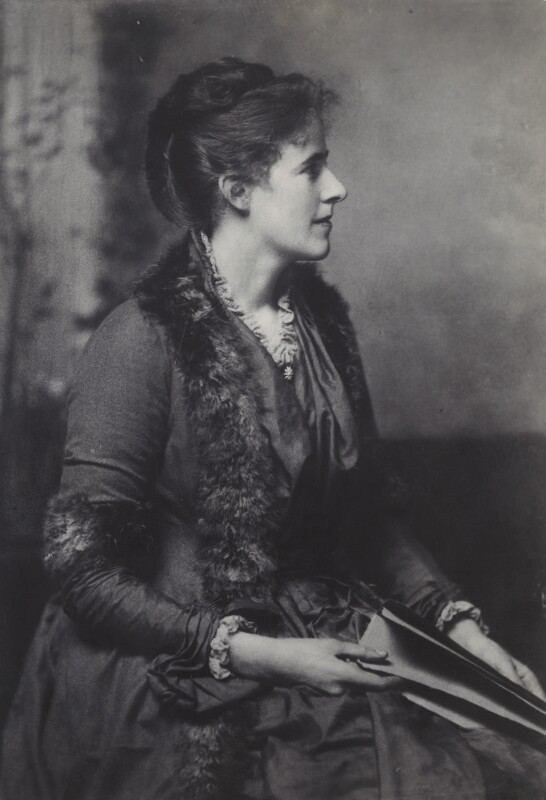
Mary Berenson (née Smith) ghost writer?, an 1885 illustration now housed in the National Portrait Gallery in London

Mary Berenson (born Mary Whitall Smith; 14 February 1864, Germantown, Philadelphia – 23 March 1945, Florence) was an American art historian, now thought to have had a large hand in some of the writings of her second husband, Bernard Berenson.

== Early life and education ==
Berenson was born in Pennsylvania, in 1864, to Robert Pearsall Smith and Hannah Whitall Smith (born Hannah Tatum Whitall). She studied at Harvard Annex, now Radcliffe College, from 1884 to 1885. At Harvard Annex, she met the Irish barrister Benjamin "Frank" Conn Costelloe, and the two married in 1885. She converted to Catholicism. This marriage served as an occasion for her family, including her brother Logan Pearsall Smith and sister Alys Pearsall Smith, to move to England in 1888. However, already by 1892 the couple had separated, though Frank would not agree to divorce.

Mary and Costelloe had two daughters, Ray Strachey and Karin Stephen. Through them, she was related by marriage to the Bloomsbury Group of English artists and literary figures: Karin married Adrian Stephen, who was Virginia Woolf's brother, and Ray married Oliver Strachey, who was Lytton Strachey’s brother.

== Career ==
In 1888, in London, she met Bernard Berenson. She became an authority on art history and took up with Berenson in Italy. Berenson developed a reputation as an art expert, and it is believed that Mary substantially helped Bernard's work. Their book The Venetian Painters of the Renaissance was published in 1894 under Berenson's name; Mary's mother reportedly asked that Mary not take credit for her work.

She and Berenson eventually married in 1900 after her first husband died, although they both had affairs and Mary believed this was because they liked to hurt each other.

Her U.S. lecture tours were instrumental in developing an interest in Italian Renaissance art among wealthy American collectors during the first decade of the 20th century.

Subsequently, Berenson brought together a social circle at Villa I Tatti, the Berenson home, and developed its gardens. She hosted some of the most celebrated personalities of the period, including Edith Wharton, Gertrude Stein, Gabriele D'Annunzio, John Maynard Keynes, and Isabella Stewart Gardner.

By 1927, Mary tired of entertaining and left the duty of hosting to the couple's librarian Elizabeth Mariano. Mariano was one of Bernard's lovers, and Mary would much later write to give permission for Mariano to marry Bernard. In later life she was plagued by illness and by 1935 she was largely an invalid. In 1940, her eldest daughter died of surgery complications, and she was left by her husband under Fascist regulations (as he was a Jew) in the care of Mariano's sister. Mary remained in I Tatti until she died in 1945.

== See also ==
- Women in the art history field
