= Stevie Holland =

American singer, writer, and actress

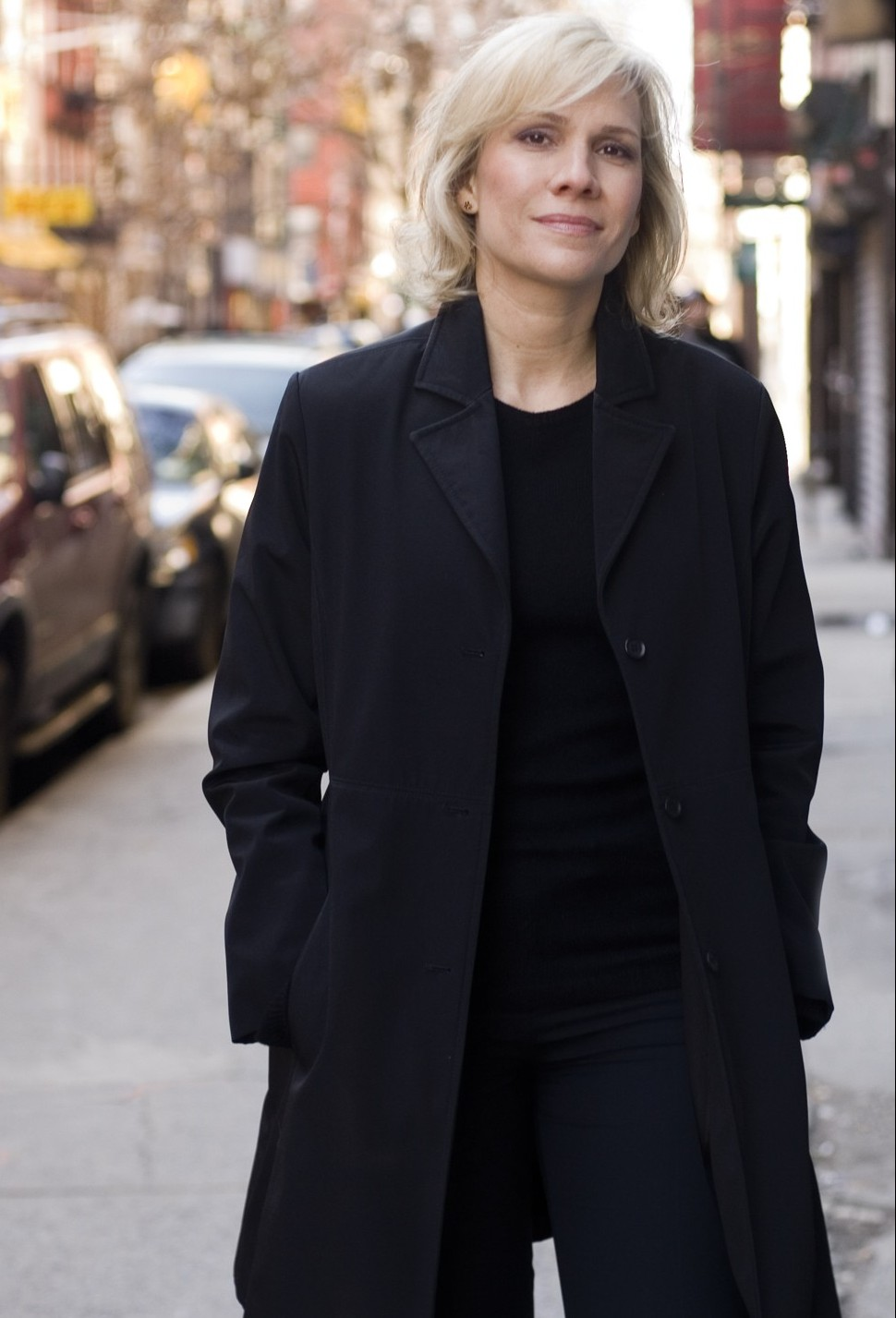
- Press photo of Holland for the release of More Than Words Can Say (2006)

Background information
- Born: January 11, 1965 (age 61); New York City
- Genres: Jazz, cabaret
- Occupations: Singer, Lyricist, Actor, Playwright
- Years active: 1990s–present
- Website: stevieholland.com

Stevie Holland (born January 11, 1965) is an American jazz and cabaret singer, lyricist, playwright and actress.

Raised in Westchester County, New York, she moved to New York City to study drama at New York University's Tisch School of the Arts. She has toured nationally in the U.S. and has headlined at Iridium Jazz Club, Jazz at Lincoln Center, The Town Hall, Merkin Concert Hall and 54 Below in New York City. Her cabaret performances won a Bistro Award from Backstage magazine for Outstanding Vocalist of the Year (2004).

Holland is married to composer Gary William Friedman, with whom she has collaborated on several albums and theater productions. Her solo albums include Before Love Has Gone, which was picked as a top album of 2008 by USA Today.

She co-created the one-woman musical Love, Linda: The Life of Mrs. Cole Porter about Linda Lee Thomas, the wife of Cole Porter. It premiered at the Triad Theatre in 2009.

Holland starred as Linda Lee Thomas, the wife of Cole Porter, in the Off-Broadway musical she co-created Love, Linda: The Life of Mrs. Cole Porter (2009–2018).

== Discography ==
- Do You Ever Dream (150 Music, 2000)
- Almost Like Being in Love (150 Music, 2003)
- Restless Willow (150 Music, 2004)
- More Than Words Can Say (150 Music, 2006)
- Before Love Has Gone (150 Music, 2008)
- Life Goes On (150, Music 2015)
- Love, Linda: The Life of Mrs. Cole Porter (150 Music, 2018)
- Talk to Your Tomatoes (150 Music, 2025)
