= Linda Lee Thomas =

Wife of Cole Porter (1883–1954)

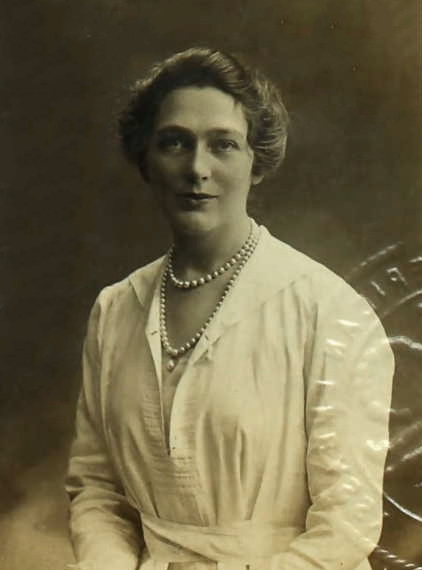
- Thomas in 1919
- Born: Linda Belle Lee; November 17, 1883; Louisville, Kentucky, U.S.
- Died: May 20, 1954 (aged 70); New York City, New York, U.S.
- Resting place: Peru, Indiana, U.S.
- Spouses: Edward Russell Thomas (m. 1901; div. 1912) Cole Porter (m. 1919)
- Relatives: Lee family

Linda Lee Thomas (November 17, 1883 – May 20, 1954) was an American socialite and the wife of musical theatre composer Cole Porter.

== First marriage ==
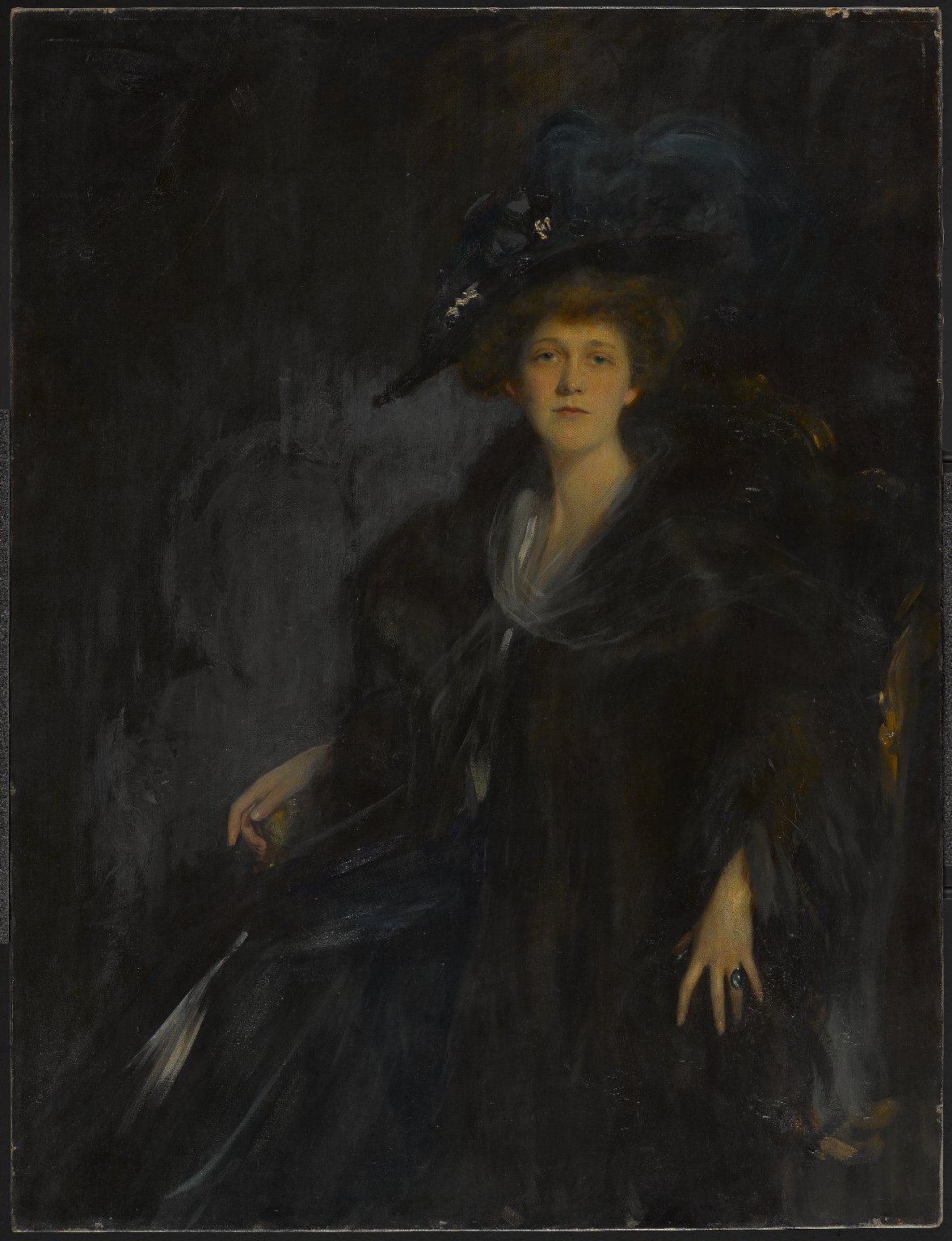
Lady in Blue, painted by Emil Fuchs in 1906

Thomas was born Linda Belle Lee to the prominent Lee family of Virginia. Her father was Louisville banker William Paca Lee and her mother Lily Lee (née Hill). Friends introduced her to Edward Russell Thomas, a son of Union Army general Samuel Thomas and owner of the New York Morning Telegraph (and who later became the first American to kill someone in a car accident). They married on June 29, 1901, at Newport, Rhode Island. She was 17. They lived a life of luxury, with houses in Palm Beach, Manhattan, and Newport. It was said that her favorite "department store" was Van Cleef & Arpels. They divorced on October 26, 1912, reportedly due to his abuse.

== Marriage to Porter ==
Thomas and Cole Porter met on January 30, 1918, at the wedding of Henry Potter Russell to heiress Ethel Borden Harriman, daughter of railroad and investment banking tycoon J. Borden Harriman and his wife, née Florence "Daisy" Hurst, at the Hôtel Ritz Paris.

Thomas and Cole were married on December 18, 1919, in the city hall of the 8ème arrondissement of Paris.

From 1930 to 1939, the Porters lived at 13 rue Monsieur, a house next door to Pierre Teilhard de Chardin, and with a garden adjoining the future residence of Nancy Mitford. They were married 34 years, and although they had no children born of their marriage, Thomas conceived and miscarried.

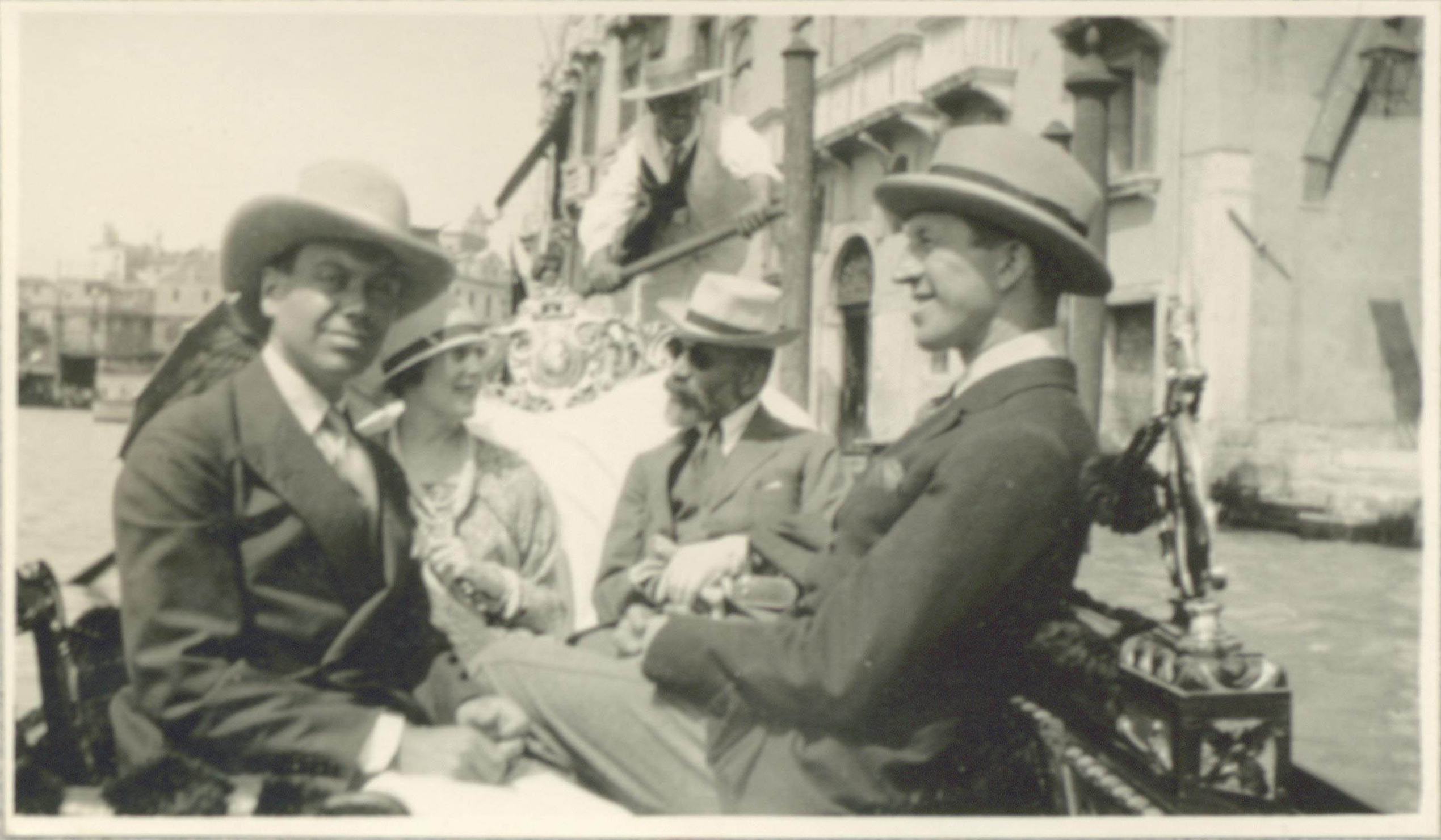
Cole Porter, Thomas, Bernard Berenson, and Howard Sturges in gondola, 1923

Thomas died from emphysema in 1954, aged 70, in the couple's apartment in the Waldorf Towers. She left an estate of over $1.5 million (over $18 million today) in which Cole inherited a lifetime interest. Her jewelry collection included pieces by Paul Flato. She was buried in the Porter family plot at Mount Hope Cemetery in Peru, Indiana.

== Portrayals ==
Thomas is portrayed by Alexis Smith in the 1946 film Night and Day and by Ashley Judd in the 2004 film De-Lovely. A one-woman show about her life with Porter, titled Love, Linda: The Life of Mrs. Cole Porter, starring jazz vocalist Stevie Holland, ran Off-Broadway at the York Theatre in 2013.
