= Bernard Berenson =

American art critic (1865–1959)

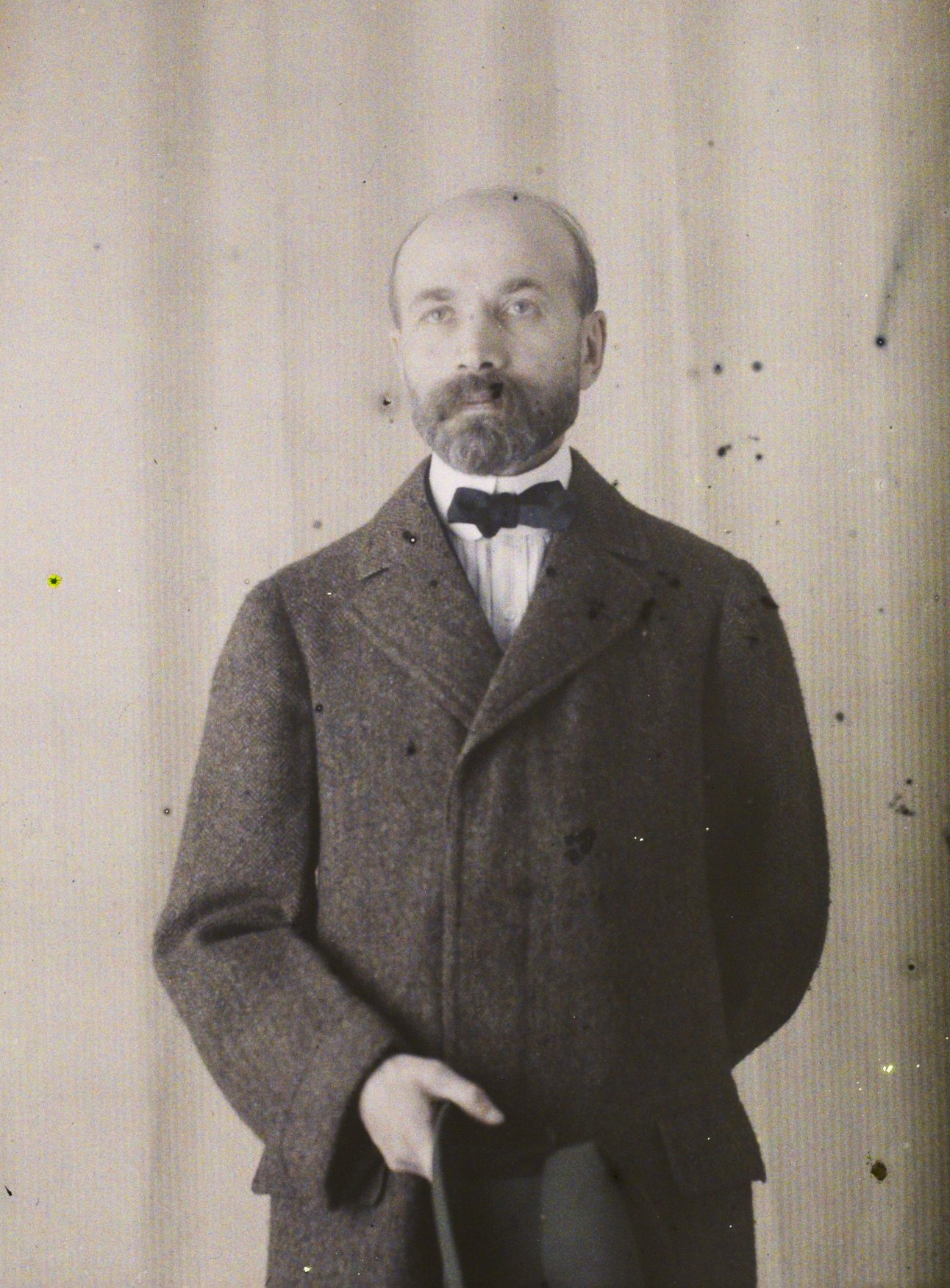
- Berenson in 1917
- Born: Bernhard Valvrojenski; June 26, 1865; Butrimonys, Vilna Governorate, Russian Empire
- Died: October 6, 1959 (aged 94); Florence, Italy
- Education: Boston University; Harvard University
- Occupation: Art historian
- Known for: The Drawings of the Florentine Painters
- Spouse: Mary Berenson
- Relatives: Senda Berenson Abbott (sister); Berry Berenson (great-great niece)

Bernard Berenson (June 26, 1865 – October 6, 1959) was an American art historian specializing in the Renaissance. His book The Drawings of the Florentine Painters was an international success. His wife Mary is thought to have had a large hand in some of the writings.

Berenson was a major figure in the attribution of Old Masters, at a time when these were attracting new interest by American collectors, and his judgments were widely respected in the art world.

== Personal life ==
Berenson was born Bernhard Valvrojenski in Butrimonys, Vilnius Governorate (now in Alytus district of Lithuania) to a Litvak family – father Albert Valvrojenski, mother Judith Mickleshanski, and younger siblings including Senda Berenson Abbott. His father, Albert, grew up following an educational track of classical Jewish learning and contemplated becoming a rabbi. However, he became a practitioner of Haskalah, a European movement which advocated more integration of Jews into secular society. After his home and lumber business were destroyed by fire, he lived with his more traditionalist in-laws who pressured him to enroll Bernard with a Hebrew and Aramaic tutor. Instead, they immigrated to Boston, Massachusetts, in 1875, whereupon the family name was changed to "Berenson". Bernard converted to Christianity in 1885, becoming an Episcopalian. Later, while living in Italy, he converted to Catholicism.

After graduating from Boston Latin School, he attended the Boston University College of Liberal Arts as a freshman during 1883 to 1884, but, unable to obtain instruction in Sanskrit from that institution, transferred to Harvard University for his sophomore year. He graduated from Harvard and married Mary Smith, who became a notable art historian in her own right. Mary was the sister of Logan Pearsall Smith and of Alys Pearsall Smith, the first wife of Bertrand Russell. Mary had previously been married to barrister Frank Costelloe. Bernard Berenson was also involved in a long relationship with Belle da Costa Greene. Ernest Samuels (1987) mentions Mary's "reluctant acceptance (at times)" of this relationship.

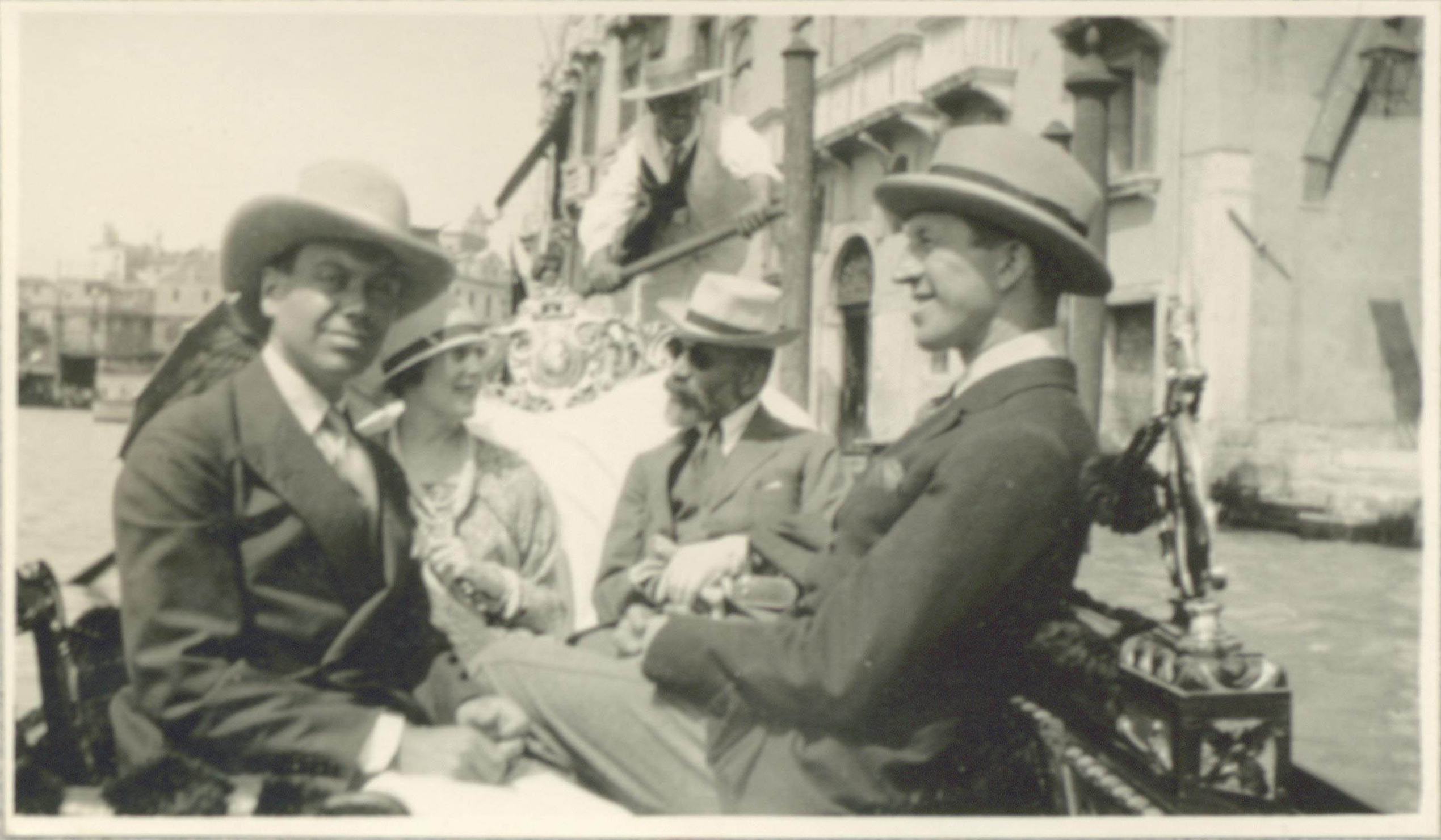
Cole Porter, Linda Lee Thomas, Bernard Berenson, and Howard Sturges in a gondola, 1923

Among his friends were American writer Ray Bradbury, who wrote about their friendship in The Wall Street Journal and in his book of essays, Yestermorrow; Natalie Barney, who lived in Florence during World War II, and also her partner, Romaine Brooks; and art collector Edward Perry Warren. His circle of friends also included Isabella Stewart Gardner, Edith Wharton, Ralph Adams Cram, and George Santayana, the latter two having met each other through Bernard.

Marisa Berenson, an actress, is a distant cousin of Berenson's through Louis Kossivitsky. Louis was a nephew of Berenson's father, Albert Valvrojenski, the orphaned son of his sister. On arrival in the U.S., both Kossivitsky and Valvrojenski took the name of Berenson. Marisa Berenson's sister, Berry Berenson, was an actress/photographer, and the wife of actor Anthony Perkins. Berry died on American Airlines Flight 11 in the September 11, 2001 attacks on New York City.

== Professional life ==
Among US collectors of the early 1900s, Berenson was regarded as the pre-eminent authority on Renaissance art. Early in his career, Berenson developed his own unique method of connoisseurship by combining the comparative examination techniques of Giovanni Morelli with the aesthetic idea put forth by John Addington Symonds that something of an artist's personality could be detected through his works of art. While his approach remained controversial among European art historians and connoisseurs, he played a pivotal role as an advisor to several important American art collectors, such as Isabella Stewart Gardner, who needed help in navigating the complex and treacherous market of newly fashionable Renaissance art. Berenson's expertise eventually became so well regarded that his verdict of authorship could either increase or decrease a painting's value dramatically. In this respect Berenson's influence was enormous, while his 5% commission made him a wealthy man. (According to Charles Hope, he "had a financial interest in many works...an arrangement that Berenson chose to keep private." )

Starting with his The Venetian Painters of the Renaissance with an Index to their Works (1894), his mix of connoisseurship and systematic approach proved successful. In 1895, his Lorenzo Lotto: An Essay on Constructive Art Criticism, won critical acclaim, notably from Heinrich Wölfflin. It was quickly followed by The Florentine Painters of the Renaissance (1896), lauded by William James for its innovative application of "elementary psychological categories to the interpretation of higher art".

In 1897, Berenson added another work to his series of guides, publishing The Central Italian Painters of the Renaissance. After that, he devoted six years of work to The Drawings of the Florentine Painters, which was published in 1903.

In 1907, he published his The North Italian Painters of the Renaissance, where he expressed a judgement against Mannerist art, which may be related to his love for Classicism and his professed distaste for Modern Art. His early works were later integrated in his The Italian Painters of the Renaissance (1930), which was widely translated and reprinted. He also published two volumes of journals, "Rumor and Reflection" and "Sunset and Twilight".

=== I Tatti ===
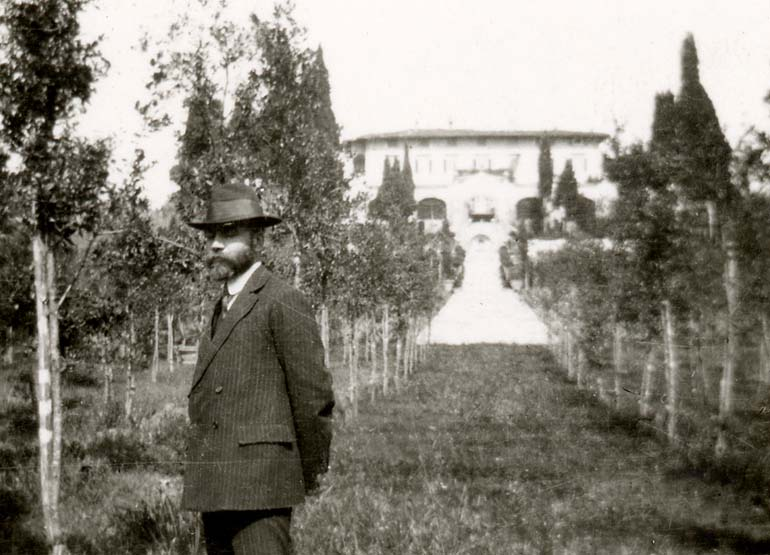
Bernard Berenson in the garden of his estate Villa I Tatti in 1911

His residence in Settignano near Florence, which has been called "I Tatti" since at least the 17th century, became The Harvard Center for Italian Renaissance Studies, a research center offering a residential fellowship to scholars working on all areas of the Italian Renaissance. He had willed it to Harvard well before his death, to the bitter regret of his wife, Mary. It houses his art collection and his personal library of books on art history and humanism, which Berenson regarded as his most enduring legacy. A portrait of daily life at the Berenson "court" at I Tatti during the 1920s, may be found in Sir Kenneth Clark's 1974 memoir, Another Part of the Wood. "During WW2, barely tolerated by the Fascist authorities and, later on, by their German masters, Berenson remained at 'I Tatti.' When the frontline reached it at the end of the summer of 1944, he wrote in his diary, "Our hillside happens to lie between the principal line of German retreat along the Via Bolognese and a side road... We are at the heart of the German rearguard action, and seriously exposed.". The villa remained unharmed. Also unharmed was the bulk of his collections, which had been moved to a villa at Careggi. However, Berenson's Florence apartment in the Borgo San Jacopo was destroyed, with some of its contents, during the German retreat from Florence.

Through a secret agreement in 1912, Berenson enjoyed a close relationship with Joseph Duveen, the period's most influential art dealer, who often relied heavily on Berenson's opinion to complete sales of works to prominent collectors who lacked knowledge of the field. Berenson was quiet and deliberating by nature, which sometimes caused friction between him and the boisterous Duveen. Their relationship ended on bad terms in 1937, following a dispute over a painting.

In 1919, Berenson was called to give expert witness in a famous case brought by a Mrs. Andrée Hahn of Kansas City against Duveen. Hahn wanted to sell a painting that she believed to be a version of Leonardo's La belle ferronnière. Duveen publicly rejected Hahn's Leonardo attribution of the painting, which he had never seen. Consequently, Hahn sued him. In 1923 Hahn's painting was brought to Paris to be compared with the Louvre version. Duveen mustered Berenson's and other experts' support for his opinion, dismissing Hahn's painting as a copy. At the trial in New York in 1929, where the expert witnesses did not appear, the jury was not convinced by Berenson's Paris testimony, in part because, while under cross-examination there, he had been unable to recall the medium upon which the picture was painted. It was also revealed that Berenson, as well as other experts who had testified in Paris, such as Roger Fry and Sir Charles Holmes, had previously provided paid expertise to Duveen. While Duveen, after a split verdict, ended up settling out of court with Hahn, the whole story damaged Berenson's reputation.

Berenson was elected a Fellow of the American Academy of Arts and Sciences in 1958. He died at age 94 in Settignano, Italy.

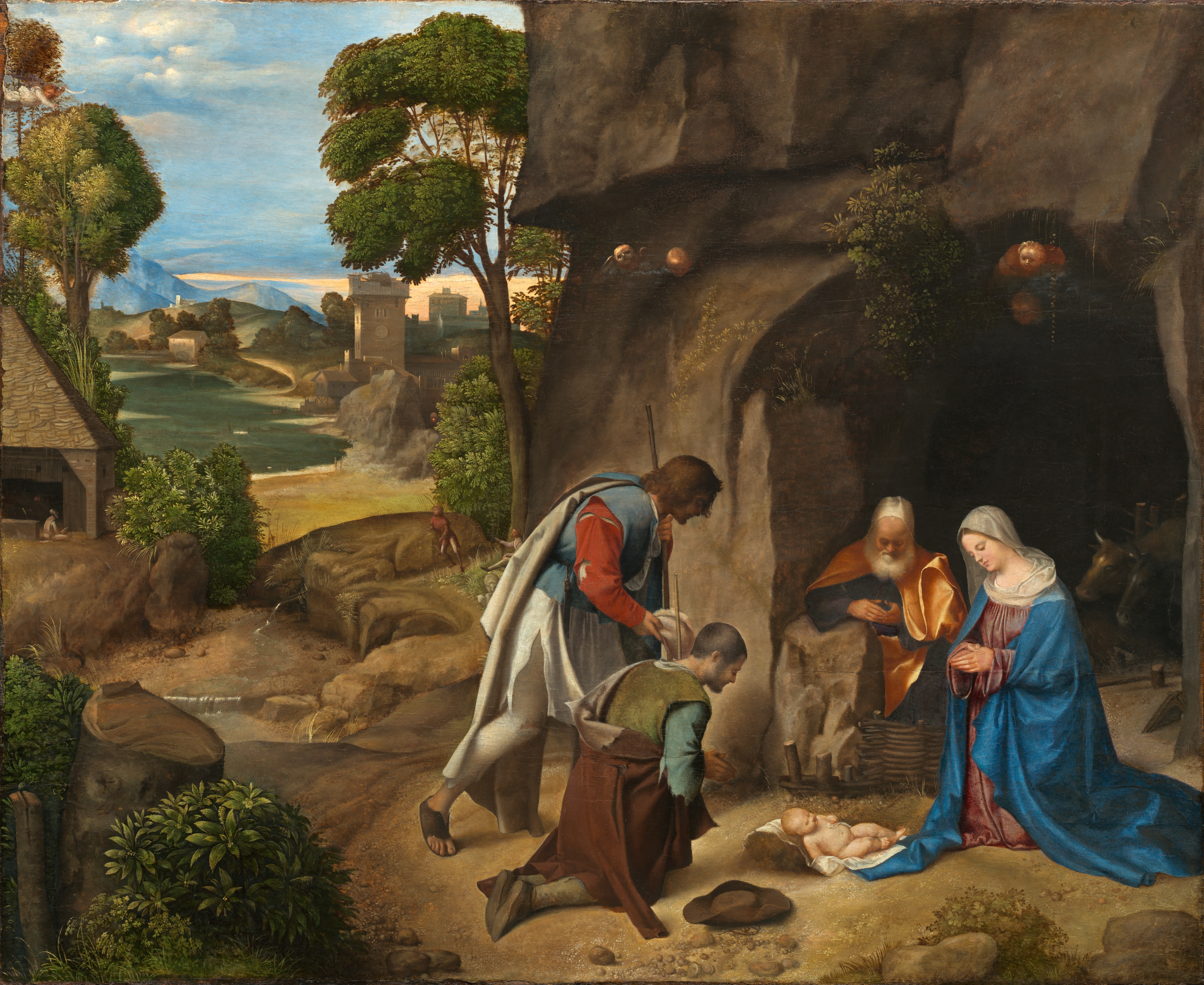
The Allendale Nativity, which Berenson attributed to Titian.

Recent scholarship has established that Berenson's secret agreements with Duveen resulted in substantial profits to himself, as much as 25% of the proceeds, making him a wealthy man. This clear conflict of interest has thrown into doubt many of his authentications for Duveen and a number of these have been shown, through careful examination, to have become more optimistic, therefore considerably more valuable, once he was working for Duveen. No systematic comparison has, as yet, been done, but a partial study of seventy works points to this possibility. The issue is still controversial.

In addition to his better-known collection of Italian Renaissance paintings and objects, Berenson also demonstrated a keen interest in Asian art, including a distinguished collection of Arab and Persian painting.

The Berenson Library (the Biblioteca Berenson) has grown since Berenson gifted his extensive collection of books and photographs to Harvard and now holds an archive of around 250,000 photographic prints and other related materials. Photographs attributed to Berenson are also held in the archive of the Conway Library at The Courtauld Institute of Art in London. Both collections are in the process of being digitised.

== Correspondence ==
The Letters of Bernard Berenson and Isabella Stewart Gardner, 1887-1924, edited by Rollin van N. Hadley, was published by Northwestern University Press in 1987.

2006 saw the publication of the noted British historian Hugh Trevor-Roper's letters to Berenson in the period 1947–60, in a book entitled, Letters from Oxford: Hugh Trevor-Roper to Bernard Berenson, edited by Richard Davenport-Hines, published by Weidenfeld & Nicolson.

In 2015, Yale University Press published Kenneth Clark's correspondence with Berenson in the book, My Dear BB: The Letters of Bernard Berenson and Kenneth Clark, 1925–1959, edited and annotated by Robert Cumming.

Nine years worth of correspondence (1950–1959) between Berenson and San Diego–based Norah Bisgood Woodward is held by the Special Collections and Archives at the UC San Diego Library.

Berenson and Ernest Hemingway kept an eight-year-long correspondence from 1949 until 1957, published in Jobst C. Knigge's Ernest Hemingway and Bernard Berenson: A Strange Friendship.

== Works ==
- Venetian Painters of the Renaissance (1894)
- Lorenzo Lotto: An Essay in Constructive Art Criticism (1895); Berenson, Bernard (1901). Lorenzo Lotto: An Essay in Constructive Art Criticism (2nd revised with additional illustrations ed.). (See Lorenzo Lotto.)
- Florentine Painters of the Renaissance (1896)
- Central Italian Painters of the Renaissance (1897)
- The Sense of Quality: Study and Criticism of Italian Art (1901; second series, 1902)
- The Rudiments of Connoisseurship (1902)
- The Drawings of the Florentine Painters (1903, revised in 1938 and 1961)
- North Italian Painters of the Renaissance (1907)
- A Sienese Painter of the Franciscan Legend (1910)
- Venetian Painting in America: The Fifteenth Century (New York, 1916)
- Essays in the Study of Sienese Painting (New York, 1918)
- Aesthetics and History in the Visual Arts (Estetica, Etica e Storia nelle Arti della Rappresentazione Visiva) (1948)
- Sketch for a Self-Portrait (1949) (Preface dated September 20, 1945)
- The Italian Painters of the Renaissance (1952)
- Rumor and Reflection (New York, 1952)
- Caravaggio: His Incongruity and His Fame (1953)
- Seeing and Knowing, New York Graphic Society, Ltd. (1953)
- Piero della Francesca or The Ineloquent in Art, The Macmillan Company (New York, 1954)
- Aesthetics and History (1955)
- The Passionate Sightseer: from the diaries 1947 to 1956 (New York, 1960)
- Sunset and Twilight (New York, 1963)

Most of his books were published in the United States and went through many editions.
