= Henryk Hochman =

Polish Jewish sculptor

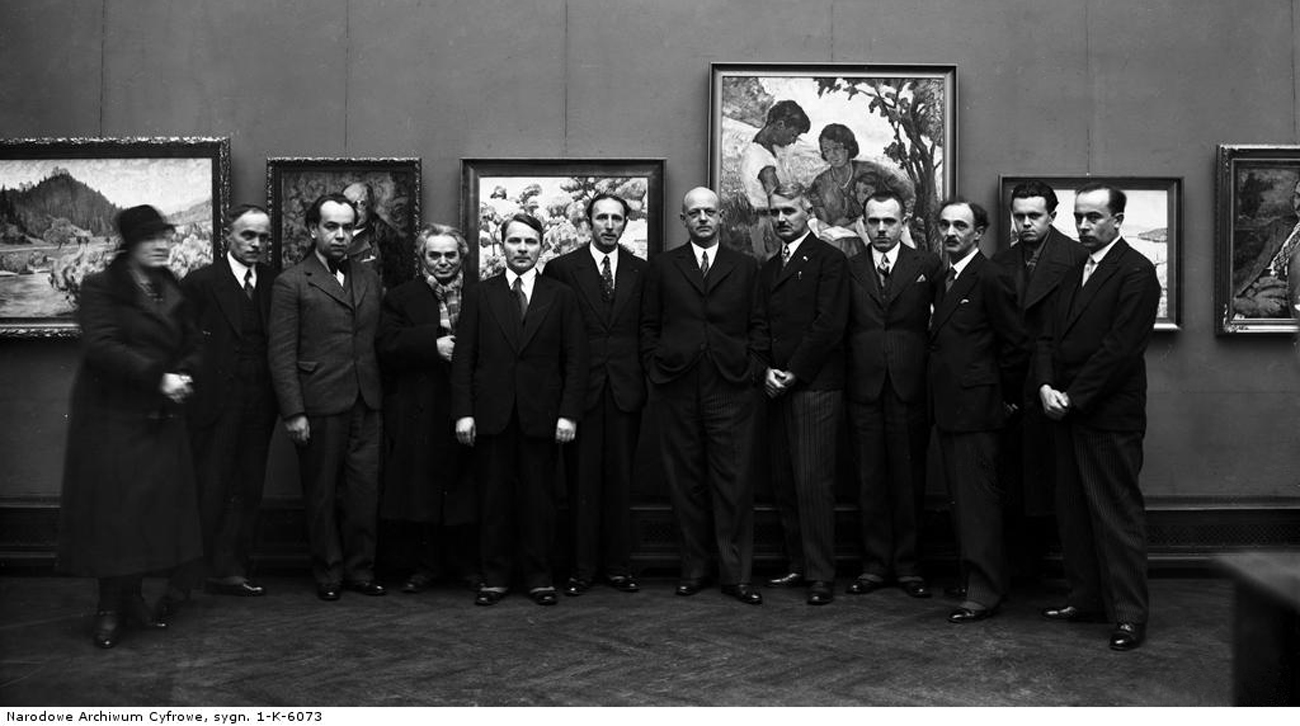
Hochman (centre) at an art opening in Kraków, January 1934, at the Kraków Society of Friends of Fine Arts gallery

Henryk Herszel Hochman (1879 or 1881 in Lublin – 1942 or 1943 in Baczków near Bochnia) was a Polish Jewish sculptor from the Academy of Fine Arts in Kraków. He was a student of Paweł Rosen in Warsaw, Konstanty Laszczka while in Kraków (1900–1906), and Auguste Rodin in France.

== Work ==
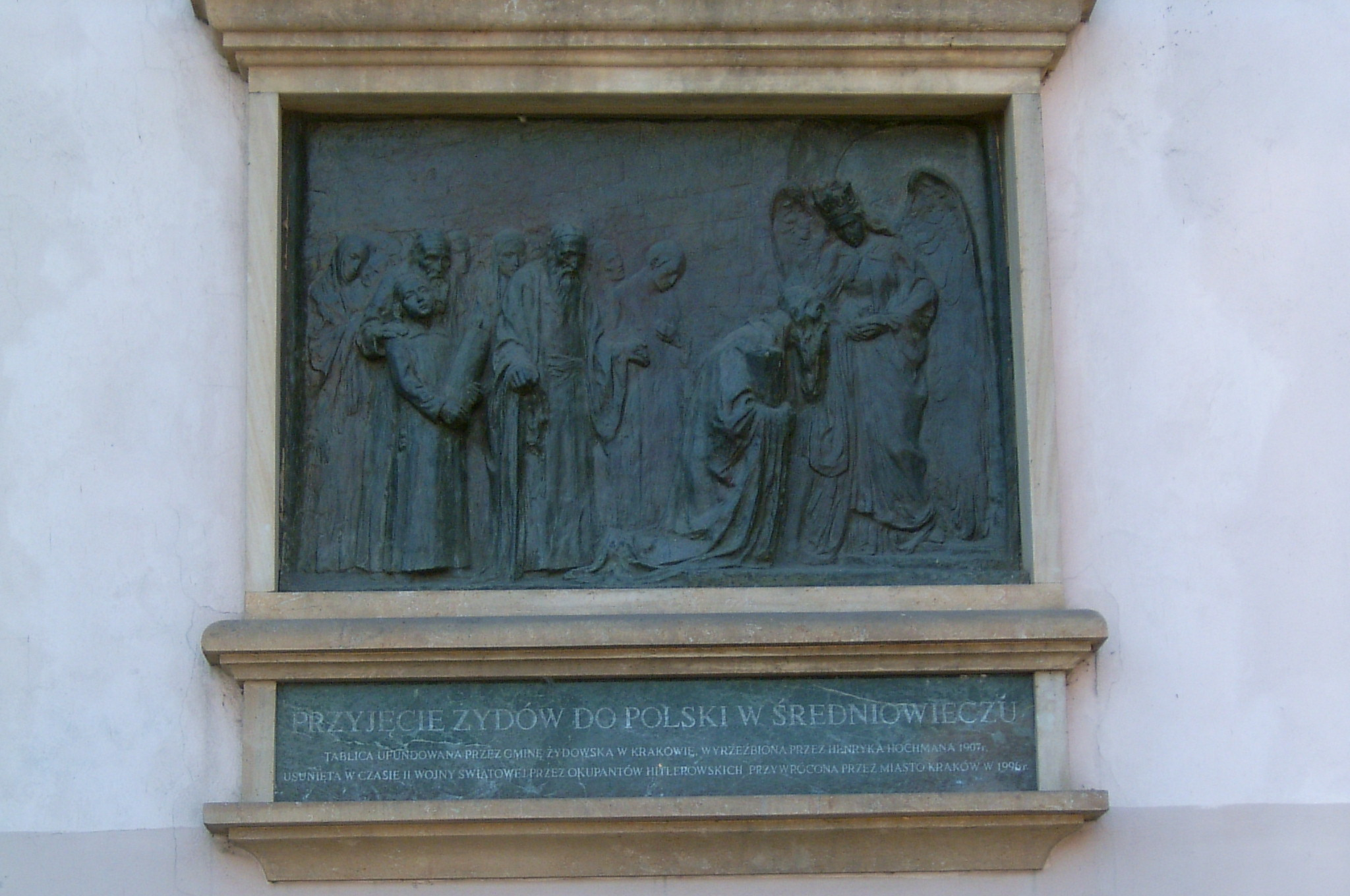
Admission of Jews to Poland in the Middle Ages by Henryk Hochman, prob. 1907. Installed in 1996, Kazimierz Town Hall in Kraków

Hochman specialized in figurative art such as sculpted portraits, the heads, and busts. Hochman is known for his bas-relief bronze entitled "Kol Nidre" (1907) in the former Town Hall of Kazimierz. He worked with marble, bronze, terracotta and majolica. During the Holocaust Henryk Hochman was deported to Bochnia Ghetto and murdered. Many of his works were lost.
