= Will Holt =

American singer, songwriter, librettist and lyricist (1929–2015)

- Born: April 30, 1929; Portland, Maine, United States
- Died: May 31, 2015 (aged 86) Los Angeles, California, US
- Genres: Traditional folk music, musical theatre
- Occupations: Singer, songwriter, librettist, lyricist
- Years active: c. 1950 - 1990s
- Labels: Coral, Elektra, Stinson, Atlantic, MGM
- Formerly of: Les Baxter; Dolly Jonah; Martha Schlamme

Will Holt (April 30, 1929 – May 31, 2015) was an American singer, songwriter, librettist and lyricist. He was known first and primarily as a folk performer during the 1950s, when he made early and influential recordings of such songs as "Sinner Man" and "Lemon Tree", for which he wrote the English lyrics. He later became known as an interpreter of the music of Kurt Weill and Bertolt Brecht, and made significant contributions to Broadway theatre during the 1970s.

== Biography ==
Born in Portland, Maine, but growing up in North Bridgton, Will Holt (his full name) learned to play the piano as a child. He attended Phillips Exeter Academy and Williams College, and studied with folk singer Richard Dyer-Bennet at the School for American Minstrels in Aspen, Colorado. Around 1950 he traveled around Europe by motorcycle, collecting folk songs and singing in clubs, before returning to service in the US Air Force. After marrying singer and actress Dolly Jonah (1930-1983), with whom he also performed and recorded, they settled in West Village, Manhattan. He sang regularly in clubs in New York City, St. Louis, Las Vegas and elsewhere, recording his first LP, The World of Will Holt, for the Coral label in the mid-1950s, and thereafter recorded for several labels including Elektra, Stinson and Atlantic.

In the 1950s and early 1960s he was known primarily as a folk singer and interpreter of others' songs, notably those of Kurt Weill and Bertolt Brecht in performances and recordings with Martha Schlamme.. His 1956 recording of "Sinner Man", with the Les Baxter Orchestra, was the first version of the song to be recorded under that name, though it was based on an older spiritual, and formed a template for later recordings including those by the Weavers and Nina Simone. His 1957 song "Lemon Tree" added English lyrics to the Brazilian folk song "Meu limão, meu limoeiro". Later versions were recorded by Peter, Paul and Mary, The Kingston Trio, The Seekers, Sandie Shaw, and Trini Lopez, among others. Holt also wrote the song "Raspberries, Strawberries", which was recorded by the Kingston Trio in 1960. The song is sung partly in French.

In 1963, his off-Broadway show, The World of Kurt Weill in Song, performed with soprano Martha Schlamme, became an unexpected critical and commercial success, acquiring for him a new audience and associating him thereafter with Brecht and Weill compositions. He also wrote one-act musical theatre shows and playlets performed off Broadway, including That 5 A.M. Jazz in 1965. The same year, he wrote a tribute to the theater music of Leonard Bernstein. He made his Broadway debut in 1969 with a musical, Come Summer, which was panned by critics, but found success with The Me Nobody Knows, based on stories written by children in New York, which ran for almost a year and won him the Drama Desk Award for Most Promising Musical Writer and a Tony nomination for Best Lyrics.

In 1974, Holt wrote the book for the musical Over Here! starring two of the Andrews Sisters, a nostalgic look at the home front in World War II, with songs provided by the Sherman Brothers. The following year he co-wrote, with actress and singer Linda Hopkins, a revue about the life and career of Bessie Smith, Me and Bessie. In 1976, he collaborated with George Abbott and Richard Adler on Music Is, an adaptation of Shakespeare's Twelfth Night. He also wrote the lyrics for the 1978 musical Platinum, starring Alexis Smith as a film star attempting a comeback as a rock singer. His last Broadway project was the 1979 revival of A Kurt Weill Cabaret, for which he performed, as well as translating some of the lyrics. In 1988 he won the Los Angeles Dramalogue Critics Award for A Walk on the Wild Side, a musical based on Nelson Algren's novel. JFK: A Musical Drama was produced in Dublin, Ireland in 1997.

Holt died on May 31, 2015, in Los Angeles of Alzheimer's disease. He was 86.

== Discography ==
- The World of Will Holt (Coral, 1957)
- The Exciting Artistry of Will Holt (Elektra, 1959)
- Pills to Purge Melancholy (Stinson, 1959)
- On the Brink (with Dolly Jonah) (Atlantic, 1961)
- A Will Holt Concert (Stinson, 1963)
- A Kurt Weill Cabaret (with Martha Schlamme) (MGM, 1963)
