= Martha Schlamme =

Austrian-born American singer and actress (1923–1985)

- Born: Martha Haftel; September 23, 1923; Vienna, Austria
- Died: October 6, 1985 (aged 62); Jamestown, New York, U.S.
- Occupation(s): Singer, actress
- Spouse(s): Hans Schlamme (m. 1948; div. 1953) Mark Lane (m. 1953; div. 1964)

Martha Schlamme (née Haftel; September 25, 1923 – October 6, 1985) was an Austrian-born American singer and actress. She was best known for singing a large repertoire of international folk songs as well as songs composed by Kurt Weill.

Martha Haftel was born into an Orthodox Jewish family in Vienna in 1923. Her parents were Meier Haftel and Gisa Braten. Forced to flee to France in 1938 after the annexation of Austria by Nazi Germany, Haftel soon joined her family in England, where they were interned as 'enemy aliens' on the Isle of Man. It was there that she made her acting debut, appearing in a German-language production of As You Like It. At the internment camp, she heard a concert by the Danish-Icelandic folk singer Engel Lund, which included traditional Yiddish songs; the concert inspired Haftel to pursue a musical career of her own. Living in London after the war, she supported herself doing office work while studying voice and piano and occasionally performing on stage and radio.

Shortly before emigrating to the United States in 1948, Haftel married Hans Schlamme. In the U.S., she sang a diverse set of folk songs in multiple languages in concert venues, Jewish community centers, and summer resorts in the Catskills and elsewhere. Her initial two albums, released in 1951 and consisting of songs in Hebrew, were made with the Israeli composer Nahum Nardi and his wife Bracha Zefira on the Reena Record label.

In 1954, she recorded the album German Folk-Songs for Folkways Records with the then-blacklisted singer Pete Seeger. In that same year, she released a Vanguard record entitled Songs of Many Lands. She also chose that as the name of her concert program, which brought her growing recognition as she toured the U.S. In 1958, she recorded Martha Schlamme – Folk Songs of Many Lands for Vanguard, and would continue releasing albums for that label as well as for MGM Records.

In 1959, her concerts began featuring songs by German-born composer Kurt Weill. She first sang them at a tiny Edinburgh nightclub called "the Howff" on the eve of the Edinburgh Festival. That one club date was transformational for her, as she later recalled: "The press was there for the festival, but they had nothing to do that night so they came to hear me. They went crazy. I was a star overnight." In 1962, MGM Records released her album The World of Kurt Weill in Song and followed it with A Kurt Weill Cabaret in 1963. Also in 1963, the label issued (Martha Schlamme says:) Kissin's No Sin.

In addition to concert work, Schlamme acted on stage in Weill's Mahagonny (Stratford Festival, Ontario, 1965), A Kurt Weill Cabaret (Ravinia Festival, 1967), Fiddler on the Roof (as Golde, Broadway, 1968) and in several one-woman shows, including A Woman Without a Man Is.... Her television appearances as herself included the series Hootenanny (1963), Camera Three (1963), and Rainbow Quest (1965). She had a small role in the 1980 television movie Playing for Time (as "Woman on train"). Her last TV guest spot was on the "Happy End" episode of America's Musical Theater (1985).

On August 7, 1985, Martha Schlamme suffered a stroke while performing on stage at the Chautauqua Amphitheater in Chautauqua, New York. She never regained consciousness and died two months later in Jamestown, New York on October 6, 1985. She was 62 years old.
