= Johnny Mathis discography =

Catalogue of recordings by Johnny Mathis

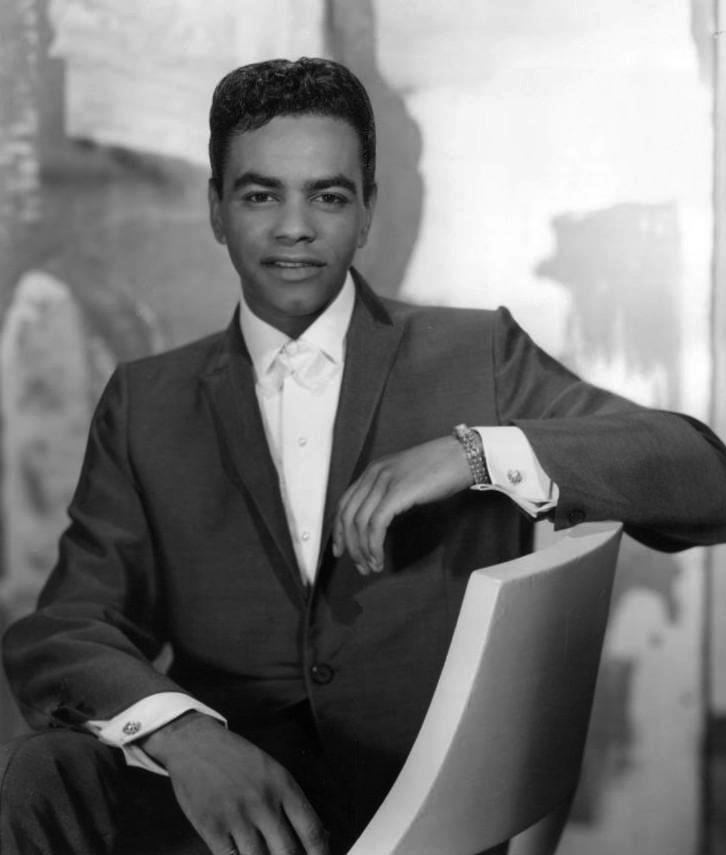
- Mathis in 1960
- Studio albums: 73
- Live albums: 3
- Compilation albums: 30
- Singles: 113
- Video albums: 3

Johnny Mathis has recorded 74 studio albums, 10 of which achieved sales of 500,000 units and were awarded Gold certification by the Recording Industry Association of America. Six of his compilation albums also accomplished this, and of these 16 Gold albums, six eventually went Platinum by reaching sales of one million copies. In 1999, sales figures totaled five million for his first holiday LP, Merry Christmas, and three million for Johnny's Greatest Hits, a 1958 collection that has been described as the "original greatest-hits package" and once held the record for most weeks on Billboard magazine's album chart with a total of 490 (three of which were spent at number one). His second longest album chart run was the 295 weeks belonging to his Platinum 1959 album Heavenly, which gave him five weeks in the top spot. In a ranking of the top album artists of the last half of the 1950s in terms of Billboard chart performance, he comes in at number two, for the 1960s, number 10, and for the period from 1955 to 2009 he is at number six.

The recurring appearance of Mathis holiday releases on the various album charts in Billboard began with 1958's Merry Christmas, which peaked at number three during the four weeks it spent that holiday season on the magazine's biggest album chart (now known as the Billboard 200) and returned to place at various positions within the top 40 slots there for the next four years. When the magazine first had a separate chart for Christmas albums from 1963 to 1973, Merry Christmas ranked somewhere in the top 10 on it for another seven years, and on the Top Pop Catalog chart that was created for older titles, it had eight return appearances during the 1990s. His Sounds of Christmas LP spent two weeks at number two on the Christmas Albums chart upon its 1963 release and re-charted for the next five years, and 1969's Give Me Your Love for Christmas reached number one there during its first of several annual chart showings before achieving Platinum certification. Other notable holiday projects include Home for Christmas, a 1990 home video special that went platinum, and Sending You a Little Christmas, a 2013 release that earned him a Grammy nomination in the category of Best Traditional Pop Vocal Album.

Mathis also recorded 43 songs that reached Billboard magazine's Hot 100 chart in the United States and another nine that "bubbled under" the Hot 100. Six of these 52 recordings made the top 10, including 1957's "Chances Are" and the 1978 Deniece Williams duet, "Too Much, Too Little, Too Late", which each spent a week at number one, and 32 of them are also on the list of 50 entries that Mathis had on the magazine's Easy Listening chart, which was started in 1961. 19 of those 50 songs made the top 10 on that list, and two of them ("I'm Coming Home" and "Too Much, Too Little, Too Late") went on to number one. The Williams duet also spent four weeks at number one on the magazine's R&B chart and was certified Gold after selling one million copies.

In the UK Mathis spent three weeks at number one on the singles chart in 1976 with "When a Child Is Born" and had two compilations reached the top spot on the albums chart: 1977's The Mathis Collection and 1980's Tears and Laughter. "Too Much, Too Little, Too Late" and "When a Child Is Born" both achieved Silver certification for singles by the British Phonographic Industry for sales of 250,000 units in the UK, and the latter eventually reached the 500,000 mark to earn Gold certification. 16 of his LPs met the 60,000 album sales mark in the UK to be certified Silver, with eight of those going on to sell 100,000 copies for Gold certification and one of those eight (The Johnny Mathis Collection, 1976) making it to the 300,000 total necessary for the Platinum award.

== The first Columbia phase ==
Mathis's self-titled 1956 debut album was produced by George Avakian, who was then the head of the Popular department at Columbia Records and signed Mathis to the label after seeing him perform in San Francisco. For the liner notes on the back cover of the album he wrote, "Johnny's singing is thoroughly jazz-oriented, so naturally arrangers were chosen who had a thorough command of the jazz idiom, as well as the ability to write imaginatively for a pop vocalist." Although the album received good reviews from jazz critics, it did not make any chart appearances in Billboard magazine.

The young performer's presence at Columbia then gained the attention of another executive, the chief of the popular music division, Mitch Miller, who presented Mathis with a stack of demonstration recordings and sheet music when they met so that the singer could choose what he wanted to record. The resulting session on September 21, 1956, produced his first two pop chart entries, "Wonderful! Wonderful!", which peaked at number 14, and "It's Not for Me to Say", which got as high as number five. Avakian helmed a second LP, Wonderful, Wonderful, in March 1957, and another session with Miller on June 16 of that year produced his next two hits: the number one recording "Chances Are" and its flip side, "The Twelfth of Never", which made it to number nine. Both the sophomore effort and the double-sided single made their respective album and pop chart debuts in September of that year, with the Wonderful, Wonderful album reaching number four without having the song that it was named for or any of his past or present hits included on it.

Despite the fact that Mathis did not have another song make the top 10 on the pop chart until 1962, his next 11 LPs, including Johnny's Greatest Hits, Merry Christmas, and Heavenly, all reached the top 10 on the album chart, and several of them were awarded certification for their healthy sales figures. The number of weeks these albums were able to maintain a chart position is especially impressive when considering the fact that Billboard only ranked anywhere between 15 and 50 LPs until 1961 when their chart for mono albums expanded to 150 positions. Heavenly's 1960 follow-up Faithfully lasted 75 weeks and was followed by Johnny's Mood, which entered the chart in the issue dated August 29, 1960, and remained there for 65 weeks. His next release was his last in the string of top-tens, The Rhythms and Ballads of Broadway, a double album that debuted just five weeks later in the issue dated October 3 and made it as high as number six but only charted for 27 weeks, dropping off the list 33 weeks before its predecessor did. After that he returned to single LPs with I'll Buy You a Star, which had its first chart appearance in the May 15, 1961, issue on the newly expanded list but only got as high as number 38 during its 23 weeks there. The rest of his album output during this first era at Columbia fell short of the performance in terms of sales, peak chart positions, and number of weeks charted that the earlier records achieved.

== The Mercury years ==
When Mercury Records invited him to join their label in 1963, they offered him what he described as "an awful lot of money" in addition to total control over his recording activities and ownership of the recording masters. He said, "I was the product of a very strong, determined woman named Helen Noga who did all my business transactions. She was the one who was adamant about me getting more money for my work. I had no idea that I was going to go to Mercury until it really happened." Since the new surroundings came with the option to produce his own albums, he took advantage of the opportunity to expand his duties, starting with his first release of 1964, Tender Is the Night, and continuing on through several LPs. "But I wasn't a producer," he admitted, " and I didn't really realize until then how important producers were and how much they assisted me in my work." While his first three projects as producer all made the top half of the album chart, his 1964 album of Latin American recordings, Olé, did not appear there at all.

In the fall of 1964 he recorded what he thought would be his next release, a collection of songs that came to be known as Broadway because of their inclusion in musicals, but it was shelved by Mercury and not available until 2012, when most of the masters he owned from this period were issued on compact disc for the first time. In his review for AllMusic, Al Campbell writes, "At the time, Mercury felt the album was too upbeat and not the type of romantic material Mathis had been so successful with during his previous tenure with Columbia." For his next three projects, Love Is Everything, The Sweetheart Tree, and The Shadow of Your Smile, the role of producer was filled by someone else. The album jacket for Love Is Everything supplied a credit reading, "Produced by Global Records, Inc.," which was his production company, but in the liner notes for The Complete Global Albums Collection, the album's credits list Al Ham as the producer. Norman Newell is acknowledged in the box set as the one taking on those duties for The Sweetheart Tree, and for The Shadow of Your Smile the credit goes to Don Rieber.

Mathis produced the two final albums in his contract and was ready for a change. In the liner notes for the compact disc release of those two albums, So Nice and Johnny Mathis Sings, he is quoted as saying, "'The only time I was not secure in what I was doing was during the three years I was with Mercury.'" Having started out with the clear guidance he received in the early years that he recorded made the absence of it at Mercury unpleasant. "'It just didn't work as well as it did at Columbia.'"

== The second Columbia phase ==
Steve Ritz describes how the music industry had changed by the time Mathis returned to Columbia in the late 60s: "Pop singers, if they were to continue to be viable, were expected to record what became known in the industry as 'cover' albums, collections whereby a certain artist would 'cover' -- or record his/her own version of -- recent tunes that had been successful for other performers." His first album upon returning was named after the biggest hit song that he was covering on it, "Up, Up and Away", which The 5th Dimension took to number seven on the pop chart just months earlier. Several more cover albums named after other people's hit songs made the album charts throughout the 1970s, his most successful one being You Light Up My Life from 1978, which had the original number one hit song "Too Much, Too Little, Too Late" to help it reach number nine on the album chart and Platinum certification. He tried more duets and new songs on subsequent releases but was unable to re-create this sort of magic with the lightweight pop he was used to offering.

Nile Rodgers and Bernard Edwards were the production team behind their own band Chic's number ones "Le Freak" and "Good Times as well as the Sister Sledge hits "He's the Greatest Dancer" and "We Are Family". In February 1981 Mathis entered the studio to record songs that the duo had written and were producing as his next album, which was given the same name as one of the tracks, I Love My Lady. The project was completed, but "nobody said anything over at Columbia, and a best-of album [The First 25 Years – The Silver Anniversary Album] came out instead." When asked in a 2011 radio interview as to why the album had never been released, Mathis gave a brief chuckle as he replied, "Probably because the record company is almighty when you're making music to sell. They have their likes and dislikes....I guess because they didn't think it would sell." The singer pressed on through the early 1980s with more albums of new material that had unimpressive sales, as was the case with Right from the Heart, which became only his third out of 55 studio releases that did not make one of the album charts in Billboard.

In 1983 Linda Ronstadt took a break from recording contemporary music in order to make an album of standards with conductor Nelson Riddle, and their collaboration, What's New went triple Platinum. Barbra Streisand's 1985 release The Broadway Album reached number one and went on to quadruple Platinum certification, so a renewed interest in what came to be known as traditional pop was evident. Mathis had not tried a studio album without current hits or new songs since the ill-fated Broadway project in 1965, so his choice to collaborate with Henry Mancini in 1986 for The Hollywood Musicals, which had a lineup of classics that were mostly from the 1940s, was quite a change of pace. And while he has done some albums of contemporary pop songs since then, the category in which he has received four Grammy nominations since 1992 has been Best Traditional Pop Vocal Album, and the industry has recognized his past work as well. Three of his recordings have been inducted into the Grammy Hall of Fame ("Chances Are" in 1998, "Misty" in 2002, and "It's Not for Me to Say" in 2008), and in 2003 he was given the Grammy Lifetime Achievement Award.

== Albums ==
=== Studio albums ===
Columbia albums (1956-1963)
Year	Title	Peak chart positions			Certifications
Year	Title	US	UK	Billboard Christmas Albums	Certifications
1956	Johnny Mathis: Released: July 16, 1956	—	—	—	
1957	Wonderful, Wonderful: Released: July 8, 1957	4	—	—	
1957	Warm: Released: November 11, 1957	2	6	—	RIAA: Gold
1958	Good Night, Dear Lord: Released: March 3, 1958	10	—	—	
1958	Swing Softly: Released: July 28, 1958	6	10	—	RIAA: Gold
1958	Merry Christmas: Released: October 6, 1958	3	—	2 (Note: Peak position from 1963 when the Christmas Albums chart began)	RIAA: 5× Platinum
1959	Open Fire, Two Guitars: Released: January 5, 1959	4	—	—	RIAA: Gold
1959	Heavenly: Released: August 10, 1959	1	10	—	RIAA: Platinum
1959	Faithfully: Released: December 21, 1959	2	—	—	RIAA: Gold
1960	Johnny's Mood: Released: July 18, 1960	4	—	—	
1960	The Rhythms and Ballads of Broadway: Released: September 1960	6	6	—	
1961	I'll Buy You a Star: Released: February 27, 1961	38	18	—	
1962	Live It Up!: Released: December 11, 1961	14	—	—	
1962	Rapture: Released: September 17, 1962	12	—	—	
1963	Johnny: Released: July 15, 1963	20	—	—	
1963	Romantically: Released: November 18, 1963	23	—	—	
"—" denotes a title that did not chart or was not released in that territory.

Mercury albums
Year	Title	Peak chart positions			Certifications
Year	Title	US	UK	Billboard Christmas Albums	Certifications
1963	Sounds of Christmas: Released: October 4, 1963	—	—	2	
1964	Tender Is the Night: Released: January 23, 1964	13	—	—	
1964	The Wonderful World of Make Believe: Released: July 10, 1964	75	—	—	
1964	This Is Love: Released: September 18, 1964	40	—	—	
1964	Olé: Released: November 1964	—	—	—	
1964	Broadway: Released: August 28, 2012	—	—	—	
1965	Love Is Everything: Released: March 5, 1965	52	—	—	
1965	The Sweetheart Tree: Released: September 30, 1965	71	—	—	
1966	The Shadow of Your Smile: Released: March 1966	9	—	—	
1966	So Nice: Released: September 16, 1966	50	—	—	
1967	Johnny Mathis Sings: Released: March 10, 1967	103	—	—	
"—" denotes a title that did not chart or was not released in that territory.

Columbia albums (1967–present)
Year	Title	Peak chart positions					Certifications
Year	Title	US	AUS	UK	Billboard Christmas Albums	R&B	Certifications
1967	Up, Up and Away: Released: October 23, 1967	60	—	—	—	19	
1968	Love Is Blue: Released: March 6, 1968	26	—	—	—	44	
1968	Those Were the Days: Released: November 6, 1968	60	—	—	—	48 (Note: Joel Whitburn's Top R&B Albums, 1965-1998 lists Those Were the Days as having peaked on the Best Selling Rhythm & Blues LP's chart at number two for two weeks out of the four that it spent there. The four corresponding weekly issues of Billboard, which is their source for this information, however, indicate that it only made it to number 48.)	
1969	Love Theme from "Romeo And Juliet" (A Time for Us): Released: July 30, 1969	52	—	—	—	—	
1969	Give Me Your Love for Christmas: Released: October 13, 1969	—	—	—	1	—	RIAA: Platinum
1970	Raindrops Keep Fallin' on My Head: Released: February 25, 1970	38	—	23	—	—	
1970	Close to You: Released: August 19, 1970	61	—	—	—	—	
1970	Johnny Mathis Sings the Music of Bacharach & Kaempfert: Released: Autumn 1970	169	—	—	—	—	
1971	Love Story: Released: February 10, 1971	47	—	27	—	—	
1971	You've Got a Friend: Released: August 11, 1971	80	—	—	—	—	
1972	The First Time Ever (I Saw Your Face): Released: May 10, 1972	71	—	40	—	—	
1972	Song Sung Blue: Released: September 13, 1972	83	—	49	—	—	
1973	Me and Mrs. Jones: Released: January 1973	83	—	—	—	—	
1973	Killing Me Softly with Her Song: Released: May 25, 1973	120	—	—	—	—	
1973	I'm Coming Home: Released: September 21, 1973	115	73	18	—	—	BPI: Silver
1974	The Heart of a Woman: Released: November 25, 1974	139	—	39	—	—	
1975	When Will I See You Again: Released: March 1975	99	—	13	—	—	BPI: Silver
1975	Feelings: Released: October 20, 1975	97	—	—	—	—	RIAA: Gold; BPI: Silver
1976	I Only Have Eyes for You: Released: May 10, 1976	79	—	14	—	—	BPI: Gold
1977	Mathis Is...: Released: February 21, 1977	139	—	—	—	—	
1977	Hold Me, Thrill Me, Kiss Me: Released: August 15, 1977	201	—	55	—	—	BPI: Silver
1978	You Light Up My Life: Released: March 13, 1978	9	42	3	—	4	RIAA: Platinum; BPI: Gold
1978	That's What Friends Are For: Released: July 1978	19	—	16	—	14	RIAA: Gold; BPI: Gold
1979	The Best Days of My Life: Released: January 29, 1979	122	—	38	—	—	
1979	Mathis Magic: Released: September 17, 1979	—	—	59	—	68	BPI: Silver
1980	Different Kinda Different: Released: June 16, 1980	164	—	20	—	—	
1981	I Love My Lady: Released: December 8, 2017	—	—	—	—	—	
1982	Friends in Love: Released: April 5, 1982	147	—	34	—	61	
1984	A Special Part of Me: Released: January 22, 1984	157	—	45	—	60	
1985	Right from the Heart: Released: March 18, 1985	—	—	—	—	—	
1986	Christmas Eve with Johnny Mathis: Released: September 23, 1986	—	—	—	29	—	
1986	The Hollywood Musicals: Released: October 17, 1986	197	—	46	—	—	BPI: Silver
1988	Once in a While: Released: May 23, 1988	—	—	—	—	—	
1989	In the Still of the Night: Released: August 8, 1989	—	—	—	—	—	
1989	The Island: Released: December 8, 2017	—	—	—	—	—	
1990	In a Sentimental Mood: Mathis Sings Ellington: Released: October 9, 1990	—	—	—	—	—	
1993	How Do You Keep the Music Playing?: Released: May 4, 1993	—	—	—	—	—	
1996	All About Love: Released: May 3, 1996	119	—	—	—	—	
1998	Because You Loved Me: The Songs of Diane Warren: Released: October 20, 1998	—	—	—	—	—	
2000	Mathis on Broadway: Released: April 25, 2000	—	—	—	—	—	
2002	The Christmas Album: Released: October 22, 2002	143	—	—	2	—	
2005	Isn't It Romantic: The Standards Album: Released: February 1, 2005	—	—	—	—	—	
2008	A Night to Remember: Released: April 29, 2008	—	—	29	—	—	
2010	Let It Be Me: Mathis in Nashville: Released: September 21, 2010	—	—	—	—	—	
2013	Sending You a Little Christmas: Released: October 29, 2013	53	—	—	13	—	
2017	Johnny Mathis Sings the Great New American Songbook: Released: September 29, 2017	—	—	—	—	—	
2023	Christmas Time Is Here: Released: October 13, 2023	—	—	—	—	—	
"—" denotes a title that did not chart or was not released in that territory.

=== Album reissues ===
Many of the albums that Mathis recorded were originally available in the vinyl LP, 8-track tape, Reel-to-reel, and audio cassette formats but were later reissued on compact disc. With close to 80 minutes of space available on each disc, it was possible to combine two albums on one CD, and several Mathis albums have been paired up and reissued in this format, as shown in the collapsed table below:

Reissue CD released	Label	Album one	Year	Album two	Year						
Reissue CD released	Label	Album one	Year	Album two	Year	1995	Columbia	Raindrops Keep Fallin' on My Head	1970	Love Story	1971
Reissue CD released	2000	Columbia	Warm	1957	Swing Softly	1958					
2001	Columbia	Johnny Mathis	1956	Wonderful Wonderful	1957						
2002	Columbia	Faithfully	1959	Johnny's Mood	1960						
2009	Collectors' Choice Music	I'll Buy You a Star	1961	Live It Up!	1962						
2009	Collectors' Choice Music	Rapture	1962	Romantically	1963						
2009	Collectors' Choice Music	Up, Up and Away	1967	Love Is Blue	1968						
2009	Collectors' Choice Music	Those Were the Days	1968	Love Theme from "Romeo And Juliet" (A Time for Us)	1969						
2009	Collectors' Choice Music	The Impossible Dream	1969	People	1969						
2012	Real Gone Music	Tender Is the Night	1964	The Wonderful World of Make Believe	1964						
2012	Real Gone Music	This Is Love	1964	Olé	1964						
2012	Real Gone Music	Broadway	1965	Love Is Everything	1965						
2012	Real Gone Music	The Sweetheart Tree	1965	The Shadow of Your Smile	1966						
2012	Real Gone Music	So Nice	1966	Johnny Mathis Sings	1967						
2015	Funkytowngrooves	You Light Up My Life	1978	Mathis Magic	1979						

=== Compilation albums ===
Year	Title	Peak chart positions				Certifications
Year	Title	US	AUS	UK	US Christmas	Certifications
1958	Johnny's Greatest Hits: Label: Columbia	1	—	—	—	RIAA: 3× Platinum
1959	More Johnny's Greatest Hits: Label: Columbia	2	—	—	—	RIAA: Gold
1961	Portrait of Johnny: Label: Columbia	2	—	—	—	
1963	Johnny's Newest Hits: Label: Columbia	6	—	—	—	
1964	I'll Search My Heart and Other Great Hits: Label: Columbia	35	—	—	—	
1964	The Great Years: Label: Columbia	88	—	—	—	
1969	The Impossible Dream: Label: Columbia	163	—	—	—	
1969	People: Label: Columbia	192	—	—	—	
1972	Johnny Mathis' All-Time Greatest Hits: Label: Columbia	141	—	—	—	RIAA: Platinum; BPI: Gold
1974	Johnny Mathis Sings the Great Songs: Label: CBS	—	—	—	—	BPI: Silver
1976	The Johnny Mathis Collection/The Best of Johnny Mathis: Label: Hallmark/Pickwick	—	21	—	—	BPI: Platinum
1977	The Mathis Collection: Label: CBS	—	—	1	—	
1980	Tears and Laughter: Label: CBS	—	—	1	—	BPI: Gold
1980	The Best of Johnny Mathis 1975–1980: Label: Columbia	140	20	—	—	RIAA: Gold
1981	The First 25 Years – The Silver Anniversary Album: Label: Columbia	173	88	—	—	
1981	Celebration – The Anniversary Album: Label: Columbia	—	—	9	—	BPI: Gold
1986	For Christmas: Label: Columbia	—	—	—	—	
1986	16 Most Requested Songs: Label: Columbia	—	—	—	—	RIAA: Gold
1990	The Very Best of Nat King Cole & Johnny Mathis: Label: J&B Records	—	33	—	—	
1991	Better Together: The Duet Album: Label: Columbia	189	—	—	—	
1992	The Hits of Johnny Mathis: Label: Columbia	—	—	—	—	BPI: Gold
1993	The Christmas Music of Johnny Mathis: A Personal Collection: Label: Columbia	162	—	—	29	RIAA: Gold
1994	20 Greatest Hits: Label: Columbia	—	56	—	—	
1998	The Ultimate Hits Collection: Label: Columbia	—	—	—	—	
2004	The Essential Johnny Mathis: Label: Columbia	—	—	—	—	
2006	The Very Best of Johnny Mathis: Label: Sony BMG	—	15	6	—	
2006	Gold: A 50th Anniversary Christmas Celebration: Label: Columbia	104	—	—	11	
2006	Gold: A 50th Anniversary Celebration: Label: Columbia	171	—	—	—	
2011	The Ultimate Collection: Label: Sony Music Entertainment	—	—	17	—	
2014	The Classic Christmas Album: Label: Columbia	—	—	—	—	
2020	Gold: Label: Crimson	—	—	70	—	
"—" denotes a title that did not chart or was not released in that territory.

=== Live albums ===
Year	Title	Peak chart positions		Certifications
Year	Title	US	UK	Certifications
1972	Johnny Mathis in Person: Recorded Live at Las Vegas: Label: Columbia	128	—	
1983	Unforgettable – A Musical Tribute to Nat King Cole: Label: CBS	—	5	BPI: Gold
1984	Live: Label: Columbia	—	—	
"—" denotes a title that did not chart or was not released in that territory.

== Singles ==
=== Pre-Hot 100 era ===
Year	Single (A-side, B-side)	Chart positions						Album
Year	Single (A-side, B-side)	Best Sellers in Stores	Most Played by Jockeys	Top 100	CB	US R&B	UK	Album
1956	"Wonderful! Wonderful!" b/w "When Sunny Gets Blue"	18	14	17	12	—	—	Johnny's Greatest Hits
1957	"It's Not for Me to Say" b/w "Warm and Tender"	6	5	5	2	—	—	Johnny's Greatest Hits
1957	"Chances Are"/	4	1	5	1	12	—	Johnny's Greatest Hits
1957	"The Twelfth of Never"	flip	9	51	38	—	—	Johnny's Greatest Hits
1957	"No Love (But Your Love)" /	37	21	48	26	—	—	Johnny's Greatest Hits
1957	"Wild Is the Wind"	30	22	37	20	—	—	Johnny's Greatest Hits
1958	"Come to Me" b/w "When I Am with You"	40	22	43	23	—	—	Johnny's Greatest Hits
1958	"All the Time" /	30	21	42	35	—	—	Johnny's Greatest Hits
1958	"Teacher, Teacher"	30	21	43	20	—	27	More Johnny's Greatest Hits
1958	"A Certain Smile" b/w "Let It Rain"	19	14	21	15	—	4	More Johnny's Greatest Hits

=== 1950s ===
Year	Single (A-side, B-side) Both sides from same album except where indicated	Chart positions				Album
Year	Single (A-side, B-side) Both sides from same album except where indicated	US	CB	US R&B	UK	Album
1958	"Call Me" b/w "Stairway to the Sea (Scalinatella)"	21	14	—	—	More Johnny's Greatest Hits
1958	"Winter Wonderland" b/w "Sleigh Ride"	—	—	—	17	Merry Christmas (single released outside the U.S.)
1959	"Let's Love" /	44	40	—	—	More Johnny's Greatest Hits
1959	"You Are Beautiful"	60	60	—	38	More Johnny's Greatest Hits
1959	"Someone" /	35	33	—	6	More Johnny's Greatest Hits
1959	"Very Much in Love"	—	88	—	—	More Johnny's Greatest Hits
1959	"Small World" /	20	19	—	—	More Johnny's Greatest Hits
1959	"You Are Everything to Me"	109	—	—	—	More Johnny's Greatest Hits
1959	"Misty /	12	14	10	12	Heavenly
1959	"The Story of Our Love"	93	104	—	—	Portrait of Johnny
1959	"The Best of Everything" b/w "Cherie" (from Portrait of Johnny)	62	67	—	30	I'll Search My Heart and Other Great Hits

=== 1960s ===
Year	Single (A-side, B-side) Both sides from same album except where indicated	Chart positions					Album
Year	Single (A-side, B-side) Both sides from same album except where indicated	US	CB	US AC	US R&B	UK	Album
1960	"Starbright" /	25	24	—	—	47	Portrait of Johnny
1960	"All Is Well"	—	106	—	—	—	Portrait of Johnny
1960	"Maria" b/w "Hey Love" (from Portrait of Johnny)	78	50	—	—	—	Faithfully
1960	"My Love for You" b/w "Oh That Feeling"	47	35	—	—	9	Portrait of Johnny
1960	"How to Handle a Woman" b/w "While You're Young"	64	83	—	—	—	Portrait of Johnny
1961	"You Set My Heart to Music" /	107	95	—	—	—	Portrait of Johnny
1961	"Jenny"	118	tag	—	—	—	Portrait of Johnny
1961	"Laurie, My Love" b/w "Should I Wait (or Should I Run to Her)" (from Portrait of Johnny)	—	—	—	—	—	Non-album track
1961	"Wasn't the Summer Short?" b/w "There You Are"	89	117	—	—	—	Johnny's Newest Hits
1961	"Christmas Eve" b/w "My Kind of Christmas"	—	—	—	—	—	Non-album tracks
1962	"Sweet Thursday" b/w "One Look"	99	75	—	—	—	Johnny's Newest Hits
1962	"Marianna" b/w "Unaccustomed As I Am"	86	113	—	—	—	Johnny's Newest Hits
1962	"That's the Way It Is" /	—	135	—	—	—	Johnny's Newest Hits
1962	"I'll Never Be Lonely Again"	—	tag	—	—	—	Johnny's Newest Hits
1962	"Gina" b/w "I Love Her That's Why"	6	8	2	—	—	Johnny's Newest Hits
1963	"What Will Mary Say" b/w "Quiet Girl"	9	9	3	21	49	Johnny's Newest Hits
1963	"Every Step of the Way" b/w "No Man Can Stand Alone" (from Johnny)	30	40	10	—	—	I'll Search My Heart and Other Great Hits
1963	"Sooner or Later" b/w "In Wisconsin" (from Romantically)	84	105	—	—	—	I'll Search My Heart and Other Great Hits
1963	"Come Back" /	61	50	—	—	—	Non-album tracks
1963	"Your Teenage Dreams"	68	69	19	—	—	Non-album tracks
1963	"I'll Search My Heart" b/w "All the Sad Young Men"	90	111	—	—	—	I'll Search My Heart and Other Great Hits
1963	"The Little Drummer Boy" b/w "Have Reindeer Will Travel"	—	108	—	—	—	Sounds of Christmas
1964	"Bye Bye Barbara" b/w "A Great Night for Crying"	53	55	17	—	—	Non-album tracks
1964	"The Fall of Love" b/w "No More"	120	114	—	—	—	Non-album tracks
1964	"Taste of Tears" b/w "White Roses from a Blue Valentine"	87	125	—	—	—	Non-album tracks
1964	"Listen Lonely Girl" b/w "All I Wanted"	62	64	11	—	—	Non-album tracks
1965	"Take the Time" b/w "Dianacita"	104	98	32	—	—	Non-album tracks
1965	"The Sweetheart Tree" b/w "Mirage"	108	75	21	—	—	The Sweetheart Tree
1965	"On a Clear Day You Can See Forever" b/w "Come Back to Me"	98	—	6	—	—	The Shadow of Your Smile
1966	"Moment to Moment" b/w "Glass Mountain" (Non-album track)	—	—	—	—	—	The Shadow of Your Smile
1966	"The Shadow of Your Smile" b/w "The Sweetheart Tree" (from The Sweetheart Tree)	—	—	—	—	—	The Shadow of Your Smile
1966	"So Nice (Samba de Verao)" b/w "The Impossible Dream"	—	—	17	—	—	So Nice
1967	"Two Tickets and a Candy Heart" b/w "Saturday Sunshine" (from Johnny Mathis Sings)	—	—	38	—	—	Non-album tracks
1967	"Don't Talk to Me" /	—	—	21	—	—	Non-album tracks
1967	"Misty Roses"	—	—	40	—	—	Up, Up and Away
1967	"Among the First to Know" b/w "Long Winter Nights"	—	—	—	—	—	Non-album tracks
1968	"Venus" b/w "Don't Go Breakin' My Heart"	111	97	23	—	—	Love Is Blue
1968	"You Make Me Think About You" b/w "Night Dreams" (Non-album track)	—	—	35	—	—	Those Were the Days
1969	"The 59th Street Bridge Song (Feelin' Groovy)" b/w "The End of the World"	—	—	39	—	—	Those Were the Days
1969	"I'll Never Fall in Love Again" b/w "Whoever You Are, I Love You" (Non-album track)	—	122	35	—	—	Love Theme from "Romeo and Juliet" (A Time for Us)
1969	"Love Theme from Romeo and Juliet (A Time For Us)" b/w "The World I Threw Away"	96	100	8	—	—	Love Theme from "Romeo and Juliet" (A Time for Us)
1969	"Midnight Cowboy" b/w "We" (from Love Theme from "Romeo and Juliet" (A Time for Us))	—	—	20	—	—	Raindrops Keep Fallin' on My Head
1969	"Give Me Your Love for Christmas" b/w "Calypso Noel"	—	—	—	—	—	Give Me Your Love for Christmas

=== 1970s ===
Year	Single (A-side, B-side) Both sides from same album except where indicated	Chart positions					Album
Year	Single (A-side, B-side) Both sides from same album except where indicated	US	CB	US AC	US R&B	UK	Album
1970	"Odds and Ends" b/w "For All We Know" (Non-album track)	—	—	30	—	—	Raindrops Keep Fallin' on My Head
1970	"Wherefore and Why" b/w "The Last Time I Saw Her"	—	126	17	—	—	Non-album tracks
1970	"Pieces of Dreams" b/w "Darling Lili" (Non-album track)	—	129	9	—	—	Close to You
1970	"Evil Ways" b/w "Until It's Time for You to Go"	—	118	30	—	—	Close to You
1970	"Christmas Is" b/w "Sign of the Dove"	—	—	—	—	—	Non-album tracks
1971	"Ten Times Forever More" b/w "I Was There"	—	—	32	—	—	Love Story
1971	"Evie" b/w "Think About Things"	—	—	—	—	—	Non-album tracks
1971	"Long Ago and Far Away" b/w "For All We Know"	—	—	—	—	—	You've Got a Friend
1971	"How Can You Mend a Broken Heart?" b/w "If We Only Have Love"	—	—	—	—	—	You've Got a Friend
1972	"If We Only Have Love" b/w "This Way Mary" (Non-album track)	—	—	—	—	—	You've Got a Friend
1972	"Make It Easy on Yourself" b/w "Sometimes" (Non-album track)	103	—	16	—	—	Song Sung Blue
1972	"Soul and Inspiration/Just Once in My Life" b/w "I" (Non-album track)	—	—	37	—	—	Me and Mrs. Jones
1973	"Take Good Care of Her" b/w "Walking Tall"	—	—	40	—	—	Non-album tracks
1973	"Show and Tell" b/w "Happy (Love Theme from Lady Sings the Blues)" (from Me and Mrs. Jones)	—	—	36	—	—	Killing Me Softly with Her Song
1973	"I'm Coming Home" b/w "Stop Look and Listen to Your Heart"	75	72	1	92	—	I'm Coming Home
1973	"Life Is a Song Worth Singing" b/w "I Just Wanted to Be Me"	54	64	8	65	—	I'm Coming Home
1974	"Sweet Child" b/w "I'm Stone in Love with You"	—	117	35	—	—	I'm Coming Home
1975	"Sail on White Moon" b/w "The Heart of a Woman"	—	—	39	—	—	The Heart of a Woman
1975	"I'm Stone in Love with You" b/w "Foolish"	—	—	16	—	10	I'm Coming Home
1975	"Stardust" b/w "What I Did for Love"	—	—	4	—	—	Feelings
1976	"One Day in Your Life" b/w "Midnight Blue"	—	—	36	—	—	Feelings
1976	"Yellow Roses on Her Gown" b/w "Every Time You Touch Me (I Get High)"	—	—	44	—	—	I Only Have Eyes for You
1976	"Do Me Wrong, But Do Me" b/w "Send in the Clowns"	—	—	25	—	—	I Only Have Eyes for You
1976	"When a Child Is Born" b/w "Turn the Lights Down" (Non-album track)	—	—	—	—	1	I Only Have Eyes for You
1977	"Loving You-Losing You" b/w "World of Laughter"	—	—	29	—	—	Mathis Is...
1977	"Arianne" b/w "99 Miles from L.A." (from Feelings)	—	—	24	—	—	Killing Me Softly with Her Song
1978	"Too Much, Too Little, Too Late" with Deniece Williams b/w "Emotion" with Deniece Williams	1	2	1	1	3	You Light Up My Life
1978	"You're All I Need to Get By" with Deniece Williams b/w "You're a Special Part of My Life" with Deniece Williams	47	67	16	10	45	That's What Friends Are For; Johnny Mathis & Deniece Williams
1978	"That's What Friends Are For" with Deniece Williams b/w "I Just Can't Get Over You" with Deniece Williams	—	—	—	—	—	That's What Friends Are For; Johnny Mathis & Deniece Williams
1979	"The Last Time I Felt Like This" with Jane Olivor b/w "As Time Goes By"	—	—	15	—	—	The Best Days of My Life
1979	"Begin the Beguine" /	—	—	37	—	—	The Best Days of My Life
1979	"Gone, Gone, Gone"	—	—	—	—	15	The Best Days of My Life
1979	"No One Else but the One You Love" with Stephanie Lawrence b/w "To the Ends of the Earth"	—	—	—	—	—	Mathis Magic
1979	"Christmas in the City of the Angels" b/w "The Very First Christmas Day"	—	—	—	—	—	Non-album tracks

=== 1980s ===
Year	Single (A-side, B-side) Both sides from same album except where indicated	Chart positions					Album
Year	Single (A-side, B-side) Both sides from same album except where indicated	US	CB	US AC	US R&B	UK	Album
1980	"Different Kinda Different" with Paulette b/w "The Lights of Rio"	—	—	—	81	—	Different Kinda Different
1980	"When a Child Is Born" with Gladys Knight & the Pips b/w "The Lord's Prayer" with Gladys Knight & the Pips	—	—	—	—	—	Non-album tracks
1981	"Nothing Between Us but Love" b/w "Deep Purple " (from Different Kinda Different)	—	—	—	—	—	Non-album tracks
1982	"When the Lovin' Goes Out of the Lovin'" b/w "Warm"	—	—	—	—	—	Friends in Love
1982	"Friends in Love" with Dionne Warwick b/w "What Is This" (by Dionne Warwick, non-album track)	38	48	5	22	—	Friends in Love
1984	"Love Won't Let Me Wait" with Deniece Williams b/w "Lead Me to Your Love"	106	—	14	32	—	A Special Part of Me
1984	"Simple" b/w "Lead Me to Your Love"	81	—	6	43	—	A Special Part of Me
1985	"Right from the Heart" b/w "Hold On"	—	—	38	—	—	Right from the Heart
1985	"Just One Touch" b/w "I Need You (The Journey)"	—	—	—	—	—	Right from the Heart
1986	"Where Can I Find Christmas" b/w "It's Beginning to Look a Lot Like Christmas"	—	—	—	—	—	Christmas Eve with Johnny Mathis
1988	"I'm on the Outside Looking In " b/w "Just Like You"	—	—	27	—	—	Once in a While
1988	"Daydreamin'" b/w "Love Brought Us Here Tonight"	—	—	—	—	90	Once in a While

=== 1990s ===
Year	Single	Chart positions	Album
Year	Single	US R&B	Album
1992	"Better Together" with Regina Belle	68	Better Together - The Duet Album

=== 2000s ===
Year	Single	Chart positions	Album
Year	Single	US AC	Album
2003	"Frosty the Snowman"	29	The Christmas Album

=== 2010s ===
Year	Single	Chart positions	Album
Year	Single	US AC	Album
2013	"Sending You a Little Christmas"	4	Sending You a Little Christmas

=== Holiday 100 chart entries ===
Since many radio stations in the US adopt a format change to Christmas music each December, many holiday hits have an annual spike in popularity during the last few weeks of the year and are retired once the season is over. In December 2011, Billboard began a Holiday Songs chart with 50 positions that monitors the last five weeks of each year to "rank the top holiday hits of all eras using the same methodology as the Hot 100, blending streaming, airplay, and sales data", and in 2013 the number of positions on the chart was doubled, resulting in the Holiday 100. A handful of Mathis recordings have made appearances on the Holiday 100 and are noted below according to the holiday season in which they charted there.

Title	Holiday season peak chart positions															Album
Title	2011	2012	2013	2014	2015	2016	2017	2018	2019	2020	2021	2022	2023	2024	2025	Album
"It's Beginning to Look a Lot Like Christmas"	27	17	17	22	18	15	15	37	38	46	43	48	55	55	57	Christmas Eve with Johnny Mathis
"It's the Most Wonderful Time of the Year"	—	—	83	76	—	77	—	—	—	—	—	—	—	—	—	Christmas Eve with Johnny Mathis
"O Holy Night"	—	—	75	—	—	—	—	—	—	—	—	—	—	—	—	Merry Christmas
"Sleigh Ride"	—	48	—	—	93	—	59	86	96	—	—	—	100	—	—	Merry Christmas
"We Need a Little Christmas"	—	—	—	—	—	86	86	—	—	—	84	82	76	—	—	Christmas Eve with Johnny Mathis
"Winter Wonderland"	—	—	38	73	72	80	75	—	—	—	—	—	—	—	—	Merry Christmas

== Box sets ==
- The Music of Johnny Mathis: A Personal Collection (1993)
- The Complete Global Albums Collection (2014)
- The Singles (2015)
- The Complete Christmas Collection 1958–2010 (2015)
- The Voice of Romance: The Columbia Original Album Collection (2017)

== Video releases ==
- Johnny Mathis Concert: 25th Anniversary Concert with Deniece Williams at the Holiday State Theatre on Gary, Indiana, in 1982 (1985)
- Home for Christmas (1990)
- Chances are Starring Patti Austin and Larry Gatlin and the Gatlin Brothers (1991)
- Live by Request: Johnny Mathis (2001)
- Johnny Mathis: Wonderful, Wonderful!: Gold, 50th Anniversary Concert at the Tropicana Hotel in Atlantic City on October 27, 2006 (2007)

== Bibliography ==
- Whitburn, Joel (1999), Joel Whitburn's Top R&B Albums, 1965-1998, Record Research Inc., ISBN 0898201349
- Whitburn, Joel (2004c), Joel Whitburn Presents Christmas in the Charts, 1920-2004, Record Research Inc., ISBN 0-89820-161-6
- Whitburn, Joel (2004), Joel Whitburn Presents Top R&B/Hip-Hop Singles, 1942-2004, Record Research Inc., ISBN 0-89820-160-8
- Whitburn, Joel (2007), Joel Whitburn Presents Billboard Top Adult Songs, 1961-2006, Record Research Inc., ISBN 978-0898201697
- Whitburn, Joel (2009), Joel Whitburn's Top Pop Singles, 1955-2008, Record Research Inc., ISBN 978-0898201802
- Whitburn, Joel (2010), Joel Whitburn Presents Top Pop Albums, Seventh Edition, Record Research Inc., ISBN 978-0898201833
- Whitburn, Joel (2014), Joel Whitburn's Cash Box Pop Hits 1952-1996, Record Research Inc., ISBN 978-0-89820-209-0
