= The Voice of Romance: The Columbia Original Album Collection =

Box set by Johnny Mathis
- Released: December 8, 2017
- Recorded: 1956–1963; 1967–2017
- Genres: Vocal; stage & screen; R&B; pop/rock; easy listening
- Length: 47:25:00
- Labels: Sony Music Entertainment; Legacy Recordings

Johnny Mathis chronology
Johnny Mathis Sings the Great New American Songbook (2017)	The Voice of Romance: The Columbia Original Album Collection (2017)	Christmas Time Is Here (2023)

The Voice of Romance: The Columbia Original Album Collection is a 68-disc box set by American pop singer Johnny Mathis that was released on December 8, 2017, by Legacy Recordings, a division of Sony Music Entertainment. The packaging noted that it includes 67 albums that have been remastered, several of which were being made available on CD for the first time. Two of those, I Love My Lady and The Island, were debuting in their entirety for the first time anywhere, and 38 of the bonus tracks included had also previously gone unreleased.

== Background ==
Johnny Mathis was surprised when Columbia Records notified him that they would be releasing a box set of everything he had recorded for the label. Regarding the songs on the albums included, he explained that his early success gave him the freedom to choose what to record, saying, "[M]ost of the stuff I ever wanted to do, from the time I was a little kid growing up in San Francisco, I've been fortunate to be able to put them into recordings." Upon receiving his own copy of the box set, he described it as "the greatest feeling I've ever had in my musical life." He told The Arizona Republic, "I saw all of the years and years of dedication and working hard and learning and trying to improve… It's hard to explain to even the most devoted fans what you've gone through in your life."

== Critical reception ==
In his review of the box set for The Second Disc, Joe Marchese asserted, "What it reveals is that the history of Johnny Mathis is, put simply, the history of American music in the second half of the twentieth century." In summation he wrote that Mathis's "consistence of quality and variation of style" were the most compelling reasons he had to recommend it. Elmore Magazine's Suzanne Cadgène admired many qualities of the release, including the organization and labeling of the discs, the album cover reproductions, the extensive liner notes, and the "delicious" music. In addition to noting how "handsomely designed" it was, Mikael Wood of The Los Angeles Times praised the box set for its inclusion of the two previously unreleased Mathis albums, stating, "Both demonstrate how nimble a singer Mathis has always been — and how curious a mind." Brenda Nelson-Strauss of Black Grooves recommended the collection "if you're interested in a complete career retrospective with plenty of tempting bonus material and you have a large budget". Michael P. Coleman of Sac Cultural Hub wrote, "We all know the hits, but the album cuts are equally breathtaking … [T]hese albums are bonafide masterpieces."

== Contents ==
Recording dates and release information taken from the liner notes.

Disc #	Album	Year	Bonus tracks
1	Johnny Mathis	1956	"Out of This World" (Harold Arlen, Johnny Mercer) – 2:43; recorded 3/14/56; previously unreleased; "I'm Glad There Is You" (Jimmy Dorsey, Paul Madeira) – 3:43; rec. 3/19/56
2	Wonderful Wonderful	1957	
3	Warm	1957	
4	Good Night, Dear Lord	1958	
5	Swing Softly	1958	
6	Merry Christmas	1958	
7	Open Fire, Two Guitars	1959	
8	Heavenly	1959	
9	Faithfully	1959	
10	The Ballads of Broadway	1960	
11	The Rhythms of Broadway	1960	
12	Johnny's Mood	1960	
13	I'll Buy You a Star	1961	"Wherever You Are It's Spring" (Arthur Hamilton) – 2:33; rec. 2/8/61
14	Live It Up!	1961	
15	Rapture	1962	
16	Johnny	1963	
17	Romantically	1963	
18	Up, Up and Away	1967	
19	Love Is Blue	1968	
20	Those Were the Days	1968	"Gentle on My Mind" (John Hartford) – 2:44; "Like to Get to Know You" (Stuart Scharf) – 2:33; above two rec. 7/10/68; both previously unreleased
21	Johnny Mathis Sings the Music of Bert Kaempfert	1968	"It Makes No Difference" (Milt Gabler, Bert Kaempfert, Herbert Rehbein) – 2:32; rec. 10/21-23/68; previously unreleased in the U.S.
22	Love Theme from "Romeo And Juliet" (A Time for Us)	1969	"The Way of Love" (Jacques Dieval, Al Stillman) – 2:51; rec. 6/5/69; previously unreleased
23	Give Me Your Love for Christmas	1969	
24	Raindrops Keep Fallin' on My Head	1970	
25	Close to You	1970	"Caroline" (Bodie Chandler) – 2:44; rec. 5/13/70; previously unreleased
26	Love Story	1971	Medley – 2:47 a. "Goin' Out of My Head" (Teddy Randazzo, Bobby Weinstein) b. "Can't Take My Eyes Off You" (Bob Crewe, Bob Gaudio); rec. 1/4/71; previously unreleased
27	You've Got a Friend	1971	"Reach Out I'll Be There" (Holland–Dozier–Holland) – 4:03; rec. 5/5/71; previously unreleased; "So Much in Love" (George Williams, Billy Jackson, Roy Straigis) – 4:02; rec. 5/7/71; previously unreleased; songwriters erroneously credited as Marjorie Goetschius, Jascha Heifetz; "I Only Have Eyes for You" from Dames (Al Dubin, Harry Warren) – 3:43; "Golden Slumbers" (John Lennon, Paul McCartney) – 3:30; above two rec. 5/11/71; both previously unreleased
28	Johnny Mathis in Person: Recorded Live at Las Vegas	1972	
29	The First Time Ever (I Saw Your Face)	1972	"Remember the Good" (Mickey Newbury) – 3:06; rec. 1/27/72; previously unreleased
30	Song Sung Blue	1972	"Morning Has Broken" (Eleanor Farjeon, Cat Stevens) – 3:40; rec. 6/7/72; previously unreleased; "I'm on the Outside Looking In" (Teddy Randazzo, Bobby Weinstein) – 3:05; rec. 7/24/72; previously unreleased
31	Me and Mrs. Jones	1973	"Pieces of April" (Dave Loggins) – 3:17; rec. 10/2/72; previously unreleased
32	Killing Me Softly with Her Song	1973	
33	I'm Coming Home	1973	
34	The Heart of a Woman	1974	"Fifty Fifty" (Jerry Fuller) – 3:22; "Nothing in This Whole World" (unknown) – 4:14; above two rec. 5/28-29/74; both previously unreleased
35	When Will I See You Again	1975	
36	Feelings	1975	"Crazy Little Love Makin' Ways" (Rose McCoy, Robert Mersey) – 2:56; "Let's Go On From Here" (Kenneth Crouch) – 2:54; above two rec. 3/25/75; both previously unreleased
37	I Only Have Eyes for You	1976	
38	Mathis Is...	1977	
39	Hold Me, Thrill Me, Kiss Me	1977	"Experience" (unknown) – 4:17; rec. 9/30/77; previously unreleased; "If It's Magic" (Stevie Wonder) – 3:36; rec. 6/14/77
40	You Light Up My Life	1978	
41	That's What Friends Are For	1978	"Comme ci, comme ça" performed with Deniece Williams (J. S. Stewart) – 2:58; rec. 4/26/78; previously unreleased; "Without Us" from Family Ties; performed with Deniece Williams (Jeff Barry, Tom Scott) – 4:02; rec. 10/21/82; "So Deep in Love" performed with Deniece Williams (Barry, Bruce Roberts) – 4:32; rec. 10/21/82; previously unreleased
42	The Best Days of My Life	1979	"I Never Said I Love You" (Hal David, Archie Jordan) – 3:38; rec. 8/23/78
43	Mathis Magic	1979	
44	Different Kinda Different	1980	"In Love with Love" (Jimmy Scott) – 3:19; "Time for Love" (Don Ferris, Jack Lloyd) – 4:23; "Wondering Why" (Ainsworth Prasad, Tamra Smith) – 3:38; above three rec. 11/27/79; all three previously unreleased; "When Am I Going to Get Over You" (unknown) – 3:30; rec. 12/6/79; previously unreleased; "Three Times a Lady" (Lionel Richie) – 4:15; rec. 3/5/80
45	Friends in Love	1982	"We Kiss in a Shadow" (Oscar Hammerstein II, Richard Rodgers) – 3:37; "Cryin' for the Night" (unknown) – 4:43; "Goodbye for Now" from Reds (Stephen Sondheim) – 3:22; above three rec. 9/1/81; all three previously unreleased; "The One and Only" from The One and Only (Alan and Marilyn Bergman, Patrick Williams) – 3:17; rec. 9/2/81; previously unreleased; "Here's to You" (Bob Geldof) – 5:05; "As If" (Shelly Peiken, Guy Roche) – 4:17; above two rec. 10/21/81; both previously unreleased
46	I Love My Lady	1981	
47	A Special Part of Me	1984	"Simple" (Vocal Version) (Marvin Morrow, Keith Stegall) – 5:55; "Simple" (Instrumental Version) (Morrow, Stegall) – 4:52; above two rec. 4/13/83
48	Unforgettable – A Musical Tribute to Nat King Cole	1983	
49	Live	1984	
50	Right from the Heart	1985	
51	The Hollywood Musicals	1986	"I'll Take Romance" from I'll Take Romance (Oscar Hammerstein II, Ben Oakland) – 3:06; previously unreleased; "Baía (Na Baixa do Sapateiro)" from The Three Caballeros (Ary Barroso, Ray Gilbert) – 4:08; "Brazil (Aquarela do Brasil)" from Saludos Amigos (Barroso, Bob Russell) – 4:15; above three rec. 4/6/86
52	Christmas Eve with Johnny Mathis	1986	
53	Once in a While	1988	
54	In the Still of the Night	1989	
55	The Island	1989	
56	In a Sentimental Mood: Mathis Sings Ellington	1990	
57	Better Together: The Duet Album	1991	
58	How Do You Keep the Music Playing?	1993	
59	All About Love	1996	
60	Because You Loved Me: The Songs of Diane Warren	1998	
61	Mathis on Broadway	2000	
62	The Christmas Album	2002	
63	Isn't It Romantic: The Standards Album	2005	
64	A Night to Remember	2008	
65	Let It Be Me: Mathis in Nashville	2010	
66	Sending You a Little Christmas	2013	
67	Odds and Ends: That’s What Makes the Music Play	2017	
68	Johnny Mathis Sings the Great New American Songbook	2017	

== Odds and Ends: That’s What Makes the Music Play ==
=== Track listing ===
Recording dates and release information taken from the liner notes.

1. "Teacher, Teacher" (Alternate Version) performed with Ray Conniff & His Orchestra (Robert Allen, Al Stillman) – 2:37
  - recorded 6/16/57
2. "Wild Is the Wind" (Alternate Version) from Wild Is the Wind (1957); performed with Ray Ellis & His Orchestra (Dimitri Tiomkin, Ned Washington) – 2:33
  - rec. 10/31/57
3. "Now That You've Gone (Puisque tu pars)" (Petula Clark, Norman Newell, Hubert Ballay) – 3:01
  - rec. 11/2/67; previously unreleased
4. "What to Do About Love" (Leon Carr, Paul Vance) – 2:28
  - rec. 5/31/60
5. "Each Time We Kiss" (Clyde Otis, Colin Towns) – 2:39
  - rec. 3/4/61
6. "My Favorite Dream" (Lee Pockriss, Vance) – 2:55
  - rec. 10/9/61
7. "A Clock Without Hands" (Jerry Livingston, Paul Francis Webster) – 2:58
8. "The Joy of Loving You" (Bart Howard) – 3:05
  - above two rec. 3/29/62; above five from the album I'll Search My Heart and Other Great Hits
9. "You Are There" (Johnny Mandel, Dave Frishberg) – 3:06
10. "Fifty Fifty" (Jerry Fuller) – 3:19
  - above two rec. 9/22/76; both previously unreleased
11. "That's What Makes the Music Play" (Will Jennings, Roger Nichols) – 3:11
12. "Let Me Be the One" (Nichols, Paul Williams) – 3:31
  - above two rec. 9/27/76; both previously unreleased
13. "El Amar y el Querer" (Manuel Alejandro, Ana Magdalena) – 4:13
14. "Cosas Pequeñas" (Alejandro, Magdalena) – 3:11
15. "Cuando Vuelvas a Casa" (Alejandro, Magdalena) – 4:00
  - above three rec. 2/11/83; all three from his CBS Discos album Cuando Vuelvas a Casa
16. Medley performed with Barbra Streisand – 4:43
  a. "I Have a Love" from West Side Story (Leonard Bernstein, Stephen Sondheim)
  b. "One Hand, One Heart" from West Side Story (Bernstein, Sondheim)
  - rec. 11/30/92; from the Barbra Streisand album Back to Broadway
17. "The Shadow of Your Smile" performed with Dave Koz and Chris Botti (Johnny Mandel, Paul Francis Webster) – 5:22
  - rec. 5/6/06; from the 2006 Mathis compilation Gold: A 50th Anniversary Celebration

=== Personnel ===
Credits taken from the liner notes.

- Mitch Miller – producer (tracks 1, 2, 4)
- Robert Mersey – producer (track 3)
- Frank DeVol – producer (track 5)
- Irving Townsend – producer (tracks 6–8)
- Jerry Fuller – producer (tracks 9, 10)
- Roger Nichols – producer (tracks 11, 12)
- Jack Gold – producer (tracks 13–15)
- Barbra Streisand – producer (track 16)
- Phil Ramone – producer (track 17)

== Box set personnel ==
Credits taken from the liner notes.

- Johnny Mathis – executive producer; vocals
- Adam Block – executive producer
- John Jackson – executive producer
- Didier C. Deutsch – compilation producer
- Mike Piacentini – compilation producer; mastering engineer
- Timothy J. Smith – A&R coordination
- Mark Neuman – product direction
- Jeremy Holiday – product direction
- William McKinney – project direction
- Tom Cording – press coordination
- Gabby Gibb – press coordination
- Matt Kelly – tape research
- Michael Kull – tape research
- Tina Ibañez – art direction & design
- James Ritz – liner notes

Images courtesy of Rojon Productions & Sony Music Photo Archives:

- CRPS
- Bob Cato
- Jeff Dunas
- Becky Fluke
- Don Hunstein
- Urve Kuusik
- Art Maillett
- Aaron Mollin
- Fred Mollin
- Ricky Robinson
- Rick Shaw
- Sandy Speiser
- David Vance

Chart positions courtesy of Joel Whitburn & Billboard Publications
