= Still of the Night =

Still of the Night or In the Still of the Night may refer to:

- In the Still of the Night (film), a Czech film
- Still of the Night (film), 1982 psychological thriller film, directed by Robert Benton
- "Still of the Night" (song), 1987, by Whitesnake
- "Still of the Night", a song by Quiet Riot from QR III
- "In the Still of the Night", a 1932 popular song written by Hoagy Carmichael and Jo Trent
- "In the Still of the Night" (Cole Porter song), a popular song by Cole Porter
- "In the Still of the Night" (The Five Satins song), 1956 doo-wop song, covered in 1992 by Boyz II Men
- In the Still of the Night (album), a 1989 Johnny Mathis album
- "Lost in the Fifties Tonight (In the Still of the Night)", a 1985 medley containing the Five Satins song
