= In a Sentimental Mood: Mathis Sings Ellington =

Studio album by Johnny Mathis
- Released: October 9, 1990
- Recorded: February–June 1990
- Studios: Petersham Church, Petersham, London, Evergreen Studios, Burbank, California
- Genre: Vocal
- Length: 54:42
- Label: Columbia
- Producer: Mike Berniker

Johnny Mathis chronology
The Island (1989)	In a Sentimental Mood: Mathis Sings Ellington (1990)	Better Together: The Duet Album (1991)

In a Sentimental Mood: Mathis Sings Ellington is an album by American pop singer Johnny Mathis that was released on October 9, 1990, by Columbia Records and continues the studio album pattern that began with The Hollywood Musicals and In the Still of the Night in which the song selections adhere to a specific theme or focus.

In 1992 this project earned Mathis a Grammy Award nomination in the category of Best Traditional Pop Vocal Album, his first nod from the National Academy of Recording Arts and Sciences in over 30 years. His only previous nomination was for "Misty" in the category of Best Male Pop Vocal Performance.

This is the first Mathis album whose release did not include the LP record format, which was discontinued earlier in the year.

== History ==
As Mathis looked back at the vocalists that he admired the most, such as Nat King Cole and Lena Horne, he felt that some of their best performances were evoked by the music of Duke Ellington. "'I wanted,'" he said, "'to make an intimate, close, hands-on portrait of this great man and his great music. And I wanted to get it right -- to keep that feeling alive in a way that was completely honest and true.'"

Several elements came together to provide that feeling that Mathis was seeking for this project, one of the more blatant examples being the trumpet work of Bill Berry, a one-time member of the Duke Ellington Orchestra. There were, however, production factors to work around, especially with regard to the fact that the vocal track was not going to be recorded separately. "The London Symphony players that we wanted were only available to us five days in the morning at 10 o'clock." This created a different type of recording schedule for Mathis. "I had to get up at 5 or 6 AM just to get my voice in some kind of shape to sing that early. But there was such a warm, wonderful feeling... even at that hour of the morning -- that I knew we were making the right decision."

The original takes from these sessions were used for about half of the tracks on the finished product. Mathis explained, "'I wanted to get some first, second and third takes with the orchestra because of the wonderful sound from this church in Petersham.'" The latest technology allowed him to complete the vocal tracks back in the US. "'I sang four or five back here. They use an amazing computer that can match the sound and the timbre of the room.'" The greatest challenge of this particular music, however, was left to the singer. "'I've sung Ellington's music in the past,'" he said. "'It was hard to sing then, and to this day it's still very difficult music. But it rewards the effort–oh, does it ever reward the effort.'"

== Reception ==
Professional ratings
Review scores
Source	Rating
Allmusic	2.5/5 stars
The Encyclopedia of Popular Music	3/5 stars

Although the album did not make it onto Billboard magazine's Top Pop Albums chart, Allmusic's Dave Nathan writes in his retrospective review that "the music remains as absorbing and enticing as if it were arranged by Ellington himself." He says regarding Mathis that "he has lost none of that special taste and phrasing which made his records consistently favored by a wide segment of the listening public," and, "He still delivers each song with emotional intensity and personal intimacy."

== Track listing ==
1. "Overture – A Musical Tribute to Duke Ellington" (Byron Olson) – 2:16
  - Fred Hersch – piano solo
  - Byron Olson – arranger
2. "Lush Life" (Billy Strayhorn) – 4:15
  - Byron Olson – arranger
3. Medley – 4:47
  a. "Don't You Know I Care (Don't You Care I Know)" (Mack David, D. Ellington)
  b. "I Didn't Know About You" (D. Ellington, Bob Russell)
  - Brad Dechter – arranger
4. "Things Ain't What They Used to Be" (instrumental) (Mercer Ellington, Ted Persons) – 1:17
  - Brad Dechter – arranger
5. "In a Sentimental Mood" (D. Ellington, Manny Kurtz, Irving Mills) – 4:05
  - Fred Hersch – piano solo
  - Byron Olson – arranger
6. "What Am I Here For" (D. Ellington, Frankie Lane) – 4:22
  - Bill Berry – trumpeter
  - Brad Dechter – arranger
7. "I Got It Bad (and That Ain't Good)" (instrumental) (D. Ellington, Paul Francis Webster) – 1:43
8. "Something to Live For" (D. Ellington, Billy Strayhorn) – 3:37
  - Ronnie Ross – baritone sax soloist
  - Byron Olson – arranger
9. "Solitude" (Eddie DeLange, D. Ellington, Irving Mills) – 3:40
  - Byron Olson – arranger
10. "Perdido" (instrumental) (Ervin Drake, Hans Lengsfelder, Juan Tizol) – 1:05
  - Brad Dechter – arranger
11. "Prelude to a Kiss" (D. Ellington, Irving Gordon, Irving Mills) – 2:52
  - Brad Dechter – arranger
12. "In a Mellow Tone" (D. Ellington, Milt Gabler) – 3:19
  - Brad Dechter – arranger
13. "Don't Get Around Much Anymore" (D. Ellington, Bob Russell) – 3:16
  - Brad Dechter – arranger
14. "Satin Doll" (instrumental) (D. Ellington) – 1:07
15. "Come Sunday" (D. Ellington) – 3:24
  - Brad Dechter – arranger
16. "Do Nothing till You Hear from Me" (D. Ellington, Bob Russell) – 4:39
  - Brad Dechter – arranger
17. "Caravan" (instrumental) (D. Ellington, Irving Mills, Juan Tizol) – 0:54
18. "Day Dream" (D. Ellington, John La Touche, Billy Strayhorn) – 3:26
  - Byron Olson – arranger

== Personnel ==
From the liner notes for the original album:

- Johnny Mathis – vocals
- Mike Berniker – producer
- Jay Landers – executive producer
- Harry Rabinowitz – conductor
- Bill Berry – trumpet
- Fred Hersch – piano
- Ronnie Ross – baritone sax
- Keith Grant – recording engineer
- Jerry O'Reardon – assistant engineer
- Tim Geelan – remix engineer
- Vlado Meller – mastering engineer
- Don Heckman – liner notes
- Nancy Donald – art direction
- George Hurrell – photographer

== Bibliography ==
- O'Neil, Thomas (1999), The Grammys, Perigree Books, ISBN 0-399-52477-0
- Zimmerman, Keith (November 30, 1990), "Mathis Meets Ellington", The Gavin Report, p. 53
