= Johnny Mathis Sings the Great New American Songbook =

Studio album by Johnny Mathis
- Released: September 29, 2017
- Recorded: 2017
- Studio: Brandon's Way Recording, Los Angeles, California, IV Lab Studios, Chicago, Illinois; Zoomar South Studios, Nashville, Tennessee
- Genre: Vocal; pop/rock
- Length: 45:39
- Label: Columbia
- Producer: Kenneth "Babyface" Edmonds

Johnny Mathis chronology
| The Complete Christmas Collection 1958-2010 (2015) | Johnny Mathis Sings the Great New American Songbook (2017) | The Voice of Romance: The Columbia Original Album Collection (2017) |

Professional ratings
Review scores
| Source | Rating |
|---|---|
| Allmusic | 3/5 stars |

Johnny Mathis Sings the Great New American Songbook is a studio album by American pop singer Johnny Mathis that was released on September 29, 2017, by Columbia Records and was composed of covers of recent hits by other artists. His last project to tackle the latest radio favorites was the 1996 release Because You Loved Me: The Songs of Diane Warren.

== History ==
Mathis sang at a pre-Grammy party hosted by Clive Davis in February 2015 and, "by almost all accounts, brought the house down and the crowd to its collective feet with his performance of his past hits." The appearance inspired the idea to have the singer make a concept album that Davis would executive produce and Kenneth "Babyface" Edmonds would produce, but instead of focusing on the Great American Songbook as Mathis has done throughout his career, the selections here date back only as far as the 1990s.

== Critical reception ==
Allmusic's James Christopher Monger wrote, "What's best is that he sounds legitimately engaged throughout, even on the umpteenth reading of Leonard Cohen's 'Hallelujah,' and his voice, which is a bit overly treated at times (seriously, Johnny Mathis does not need Auto-Tune), is as strong as ever, making one wonder why it took so long for him to apply his still considerable gifts to more contemporary fare."

== Track listing ==
1. "Hallelujah" (Leonard Cohen) – 5:30
2. "Once Before I Go" (Peter Allen, Dean Pitchford) – 3:49
3. "Blue Ain't Your Color" (Steven Lee Olsen, Hillary Lindsey, Clint Lagerberg) – 3:44
4. "You Raise Me Up" (Brendan Graham, Rolf Løvland) – 4:01
5. "Say Something" (Ian Axel, Chad King, Mike Campbell) – 3:15
6. "Just the Way You Are" (Philip Lawrence, Ari Levine, Bruno Mars, Khari Cain, Saint Cassius) – 3:27
7. "I Believe I Can Fly" (R. Kelly) – 4:47
8. "Remember When" (Alan Jackson) – 3:55
9. "Happy" (Pharrell Williams) – 3:25
10. "Hello" (Adele Adkins, Greg Kurstin) – 5:17
11. "Run to You" (Allan Rich, Jud Friedman) – 4:29

== Personnel ==
Musicians

- Johnny Mathis - vocals
- Percy Bady - choir director
- Felicia Barton – background vocals
- Paul Boutin - engineer, mixing, percussion
- Vernard Burton - choir/chorus
- Antonio Dixon - drum programming, keyboard programming, producer
- Kenneth "Babyface" Edmonds - bass, electric bass, drum programming, acoustic guitar, electric guitar, keyboard programming, producer, background vocals
- Chloe Flower - piano arrangement
- Paul Franklin - pedal steel guitar
- Kenny G - soprano sax
- Eleanor Hampton - choir/chorus
- Lori Hardiman - choir/chorus
- Kenya Henry - choir/chorus
- Judith Hill – background vocals
- Carya Holmes - choir/chorus
- Kimberly Holmes - choir/chorus
- Andrea Moore - choir/chorus
- Marcus Morton - choir/chorus
- Demonté Posey - drum programming, keyboard programming, organ, producer, string arrangements
- Michael Ripoll - acoustic guitar
- William Ross - string arrangements
- Aaron Shuman - string preparation
- Shawn Stockman - guest artist
- Terrance Marshall - choir/chorus

Production

- Kenneth "Babyface" Edmonds - producer
- Mary Webster - producer, string score
- John Doelp - A&R
- Jay Landers - A&R
- Vlado Meller - mastering
- Jeff Breaky - engineer
- Fred Mollin - engineer
- Dave Salley - engineer
- Rollin Weary - assistant engineer
- Eliot Hazel - photography
- Dave Bett - art direction
- Tina Ibañez - design
- Johnny Mathis - liner notes
