= Good Night, Dear Lord =

Studio album by Johnny Mathis
- Released: March 3, 1958
- Recorded: January 2–3, 6, 1958
- Genre: Spirituals; vocal; Jewish; classical
- Length: 41:47
- Label: Columbia
- Producer: Mitch Miller

Johnny Mathis chronology
Warm (1957)	Good Night, Dear Lord (1958)	Johnny's Greatest Hits (1958)

Alternate cover

Good Night, Dear Lord is the fourth album by American pop singer Johnny Mathis that was released by Columbia Records on March 3, 1958, and is the first of many projects undertaken over the course of his career that have a specific focus, which here happens to be religion. Several musical styles are covered, including spirituals ("Swing Low, Sweet Chariot", "Deep River"), classical works (the Bach/Gounod and Schubert compositions of "Ave Maria"), songs from the Jewish tradition ("Eli Eli", "Kol Nidre"), and 20th-century offerings ("May the Good Lord Bless and Keep You", "One God").

The album debuted on Billboard magazine's list of the 25 Best-Selling Pop LPs in the US in the issue dated April 7, 1958, and peaked at number 10 during its 12 weeks there.

The release of the album in the UK on the Fontana label was re-titled Heavenly (not to be confused with Mathis's album of the same name that came out the following year). While the original US release of Good Night, Dear Lord was in the monaural format, the stereo version was available later that year, on July 14. On May 7, 1996, it was issued for the first time on compact disc. Good Night, Dear Lord was also included in Legacy's Mathis box set The Voice of Romance: The Columbia Original Album Collection, which was released on December 8, 2017.

== Reception ==
Professional ratings
Review scores
Source	Rating
The Encyclopedia of Popular Music	2/5 stars

Billboard magazine described the album as a "beautiful set of religious songs, rendered with feeling and sincerity by the artist."

In the liner notes of her 1997 album Higher Ground, Barbra Streisand wrote, "I first heard 'Deep River' at age 16 when I bought my first Johnny Mathis record at the supermarket for $1.98. He sang it so beautifully. The song always stayed with me." She recorded that song as part of a medley for the album, and included another of her Good Night, Dear Lord discoveries, "One God", on her Christmas Memories album in 2001.

The Mathis recording of "Kol Nidre" inspired the Idelsohn Society, named for musicologist Abraham Zevi Idelsohn, to compile other Jewish songs by African-American artists on the 2010 CD Black Sabbath: The Secret Musical History of Black-Jewish Relations. In August 2010 Mathis was the recipient of the Idelsohn Society Honors, which was created to "pay tribute to key figures in American-Jewish music whose stories have not been told."

== Track listing ==
Side one
No.	Title	Writer(s)	Length
1.	"Good Night, Dear Lord"	Paul Tripp, Ray Carter	3:30
2.	"Swing Low, Sweet Chariot"	traditional	3:48
3.	"May the Good Lord Bless and Keep You"	Meredith Willson	3:47
4.	"I Heard a Forest Praying"	Sam M. Lewis, Peter De Rose	3:10
5.	"The Rosary"	Ethelbert Nevin, Robert Cameron Rogers	2:21
6.	"One God"	Ervin Drake, Jimmy Shirl	3:48

Side two
No.	Title	Writer(s)	Length
1.	"Deep River"	traditional	2:49
2.	"Where Can I Go?"	Sonny Miller, Leo Fuld, Sigmunt Berland	3:36
3.	"Eli Eli"	traditional	4:29
4.	"Kol Nidre"	traditional	2:56
5.	"Ave Maria"	Franz Schubert	4:34
6.	"Ave Maria"	Johann Sebastian Bach, Charles Gounod	2:59

== Recording dates ==
From the liner notes for the 1996 CD release:

- January 2, 1958 — "May the Good Lord Bless and Keep You", "The Rosary", "Where Can I Go?"
- January 3, 1958 — "Ave Maria" (Bach/Gounod), "Ave Maria" (Schubert), "Deep River", "Good Night, Dear Lord", "Swing Low, Sweet Chariot"
- January 6, 1958 — "Eli Eli", "I Heard a Forest Praying", "Kol Nidre", "One God"

== Personnel ==
=== Original album ===
- Johnny Mathis – vocals
- Mitch Miller – producer
- Al Ham – associate producer
- Percy Faith – arranger and conductor
- Tom Palumbo – photography
- Recorded at CBS 30th Street Studios, New York

=== 1996 CD release ===
From the liner notes for the CD:

- Didier C. Deutsch – producer
- Thomas Ruff – remixing and mastering
- Adam Block – project director
- Joy Gilbert – product manager
- Lisa Sparagano – designer
- Hope Chasin – packaging manager
- Sony Music Library – photos
- Remixed and mastered at Sony Music Studios, New York, NY

== Bibliography ==
- Whitburn, Joel (2010), Joel Whitburn Presents Top Pop Albums, Seventh Edition, Record Research Inc., ISBN 0-89820-183-7
