= Rapture (Johnny Mathis album) =

Studio album by Johnny Mathis
- Released: September 17, 1962
- Recorded: August 1, 1962; August 6–8, 1962
- Genre: Vocal
- Length: 42:20
- Label: Columbia
- Producer: Ernie Altschuler

Johnny Mathis chronology
Live It Up! (1961)	Rapture (1962)	Johnny's Newest Hits (1963)

Professional ratings
Review scores
Source	Rating
Billboard	positive
The Encyclopedia of Popular Music	4/5 stars

Rapture is an album by American pop singer Johnny Mathis that was released on September 17, 1962, by Columbia Records and returned him to singing a full line-up of the sort of ballads that he was known for.

The album made its first appearance on Billboard magazine's album chart in the October 27, 1962, issue and reached number 12 during its 37 weeks there. it debuted on the Cashbox albums chart in the issue dated October 20, 1962, remaining on that chart for a total of 39 weeks and hitting a peak position of number nine.

The first compact disc release of the album came on June 9, 2009, when it was issued as disc one of a two-CD set that also included his 1963 offering Romantically. Rapture was also included in Legacy's Mathis box set The Voice of Romance: The Columbia Original Album Collection, which was released on December 8, 2017.

== Reception ==
Billboard captured the feel of the album in their review. "'Velvety' is a good one-word description of this new album by Mathis, who's given lush musical settings by Don Costa's ork." They also singled out certain tracks. "The material is all in a softly romantic vein, with 'My Darling, My Darling', 'Stars Fell on Alabama', and 'Stella by Starlight' among the best." The review also noted that a small reproduction of the cover painting was included with the LP as a bonus.

Cashbox described the album as "one of his best performances to date on this LP of Don Costa-arranged sturdies" and notes Mathis "rich, full-bodied voice aptly showcased in top-fight arrangements of 'Moments Like This' and 'Stella By Starlight'.'

Variety reported that the album showed "Johnny Mathis plays up his soft and smooth vocal styling in this warp up of romantic songs."

American Record Guide notes that album showed "Johnny Mathis countins to grow in vocal quality and to sing songs of more than passing interest."

== Track listing ==
=== Side one ===
1. "Rapture" (Marian Kennedy) – 3:20
2. "Love Me as Though There Were No Tomorrow" from the musical Strip for Action (Harold Adamson, Jimmy McHugh) – 3:08
3. "Moments Like This" from College Swing (Burton Lane, Frank Loesser) – 2:50
4. "You've Come Home" from Wildcat (Cy Coleman, Carolyn Leigh) – 3:58
5. "Here I'll Stay" from Love Life (Alan Jay Lerner, Kurt Weill)– 4:20
6. "My Darling, My Darling" from Where's Charley? (Loesser) – 3:45

=== Side two ===
1. "Stars Fell on Alabama" (Mitchell Parish, Frank Perkins) – 3:24
2. "I Was Telling Her About You" (Moose Charlap, Don George) – 3:38
3. "Lament (Love, I Found You Gone)" (Joe Bailey, Morris Levy, Dinah Washington) – 3:20
4. "The Love Nest" from the musical Mary (Otto Harbach, Louis Hirsch) – 3:05
5. "Lost in Loveliness" from The Girl in Pink Tights (Leo Robin, Sigmund Romberg) – 4:19
6. "Stella by Starlight" (Ned Washington, Victor Young) – 3:33

== Charts ==
Chart (1962)	Peak position
US Top LPs (Billboard)	12
US Cash Box	9

== Recording dates ==
From the liner notes for The Voice of Romance: The Columbia Original Album Collection:

- August 1, 1962 — "Love Me as Though There Were No Tomorrow", "Rapture", "Stars Fell on Alabama", "You've Come Home"
- August 6, 1962 — "I Was Telling Her About You", "Lost in Loveliness"
- August 7, 1962 — "Here I'll Stay", "Lament (Love, I Found You Gone)"
- August 8, 1962 — "The Love Nest", "Moments Like This", "My Darling, My Darling", "Stella by Starlight"

== Personnel ==
- Johnny Mathis – vocals
- Ernie Altschuler – producer
- Don Costa – arranger and conductor
- Ralph Cowan – cover painting

== Bibliography ==
- Whitburn, Joel (2010), Joel Whitburn Presents Top Pop Albums, Seventh Edition, Record Research Inc., ISBN 0-89820-183-7
- Hoffmann, Frank W (1988), The Cash box album charts, 1955-1974, Scarecrow Press, ISBN 0-810-82005-6
