= The First Time Ever (I Saw Your Face) (Johnny Mathis album) =

Studio album by Johnny Mathis
- Released: May 10, 1972
- Recorded: January–April 1972
- Genre: Traditional pop; soft rock
- Length: 35:35
- Label: Columbia
- Producer: Jerry Fuller

Johnny Mathis chronology
Johnny Mathis in Person: Recorded Live at Las Vegas (1972)	The First Time Ever (I Saw Your Face) (1972)	Johnny Mathis' All-Time Greatest Hits (1972)

Professional ratings
Review scores
Source	Rating
Allmusic	3/5 stars
Billboard	positive
The Encyclopedia of Popular Music	4/5 stars

The First Time Ever (I Saw Your Face) is an album by American pop singer Johnny Mathis released on May 10, 1972, by Columbia Records and continues in the tradition set by his recent studio releases of covering mostly current chart hits. A trio of selections on side one ("Love Theme from 'The Godfather' (Speak Softly Love)", "Theme from 'Summer of 42' (The Summer Knows)", and "Brian's Song (The Hands of Time)") originated as film scores and had lyrics added later.

The album made its first appearance on Billboard magazine's Top LP's & Tapes chart in the issue dated June 10, 1972, and remained there for 15 weeks, peaking at number 71. it also debuted on the Cash Box albums chart in the issue dated June 17, 1972, and remained on the chart for 12 weeks, peaking at number 75.

This LP was released as a DTS Surround Sound CD on May 23, 2000. The reason for the selection of this particular album for DTS release is suggested in a message in the liner notes from the CD's producer, Patricia Miller: "I dedicate this to the memory of my loving Brad. Thank you for all the strength and passion you gave me during our time together and forever. These love songs tell a story of our everlasting love."

== Reception ==
Billboard was complimentary. "Mathis is one of the best contemporary balladeers around, and here he wisely sticks to his forte."

== Track listing ==
=== Side one ===
1. "The First Time Ever (I Saw Your Face)" (Ewan MacColl) – 3:36
2. "Love Theme from 'The Godfather' (Speak Softly Love)" (Larry Kusik, Nino Rota) – 3:08
3. "Theme from Summer of '42 (The Summer Knows)" (Alan Bergman, Marilyn Bergman, Michel Legrand) – 2:39
4. "Brian's Song (The Hands of Time)" (A. Bergman, M. Bergman, Legrand) – 3:24
5. "Since I Fell for You" (Buddy Johnson) – 3:17

=== Side two ===
1. "Without You" (Tom Evans, Peter Ham) – 2:58
2. "Betcha by Golly, Wow" (Thom Bell, Linda Creed) – 2:49
3. "Life and Breath" (George S. Clinton) – 3:27
4. "I Need You" (Gerry Beckley) – 2:36
5. "(Last Night) I Didn't Get to Sleep at All" (Tony Macaulay) – 3:33
6. "Life Is What You Make It" from Kotch (Marvin Hamlisch, Johnny Mercer) – 2:50

=== 2017 CD bonus track ===
This album's CD release as part of the 2017 box set The Voice of Romance: The Columbia Original Album Collection included a bonus track that was previously unavailable:

- "Remember the Good" (Mickey Newbury) – 3:06

== Recording dates ==
From the liner notes for The Voice of Romance: The Columbia Original Album Collection:

- January 27, 1972 – "Brian's Song (The Hands of Time)", "Remember the Good"
- February 11, 1972 – "Theme from 'Summer of 42' (The Summer Knows)", "Without You"
- March 13, 1972 – "The First Time Ever (I Saw Your Face)", "Life Is What You Make It", "Love Theme from 'The Godfather' (Speak Softly Love)"
- March 20, 1972 – "Betcha by Golly, Wow", "I Need You", "Since I Fell for You"
- April 3, 1972 – "(Last Night) I Didn't Get to Sleep at All", "Life and Breath"

== Personnel ==
- Johnny Mathis - vocals
- Jerry Fuller - producer
- Al Capps - arranger ("The First Time Ever (I Saw Your Face)", "Speak Softly Love (Love Theme from 'The Godfather')", "Theme from 'Summer of 42'", "Brian's Song", "Without You")
- D'Arneill Pershing - arranger ("Since I Fell for You", "Betcha by Golly Wow", "Life and Breath", "I Need You", "(Last Night) I Didn't Get to Sleep at All", "Life Is What You Make It")
- Peter Romano - engineer
- Beverly Parker - photos

== Bibliography ==
- Whitburn, Joel (2010). Joel Whitburn Presents Top Pop Albums, Seventh Edition. Record Research Inc. ISBN 978-0-89820-183-3.
- Hoffmann, Frank W (1988), The Cash box album charts, 1955-1974, Scarecrow Press, ISBN 0-810-82005-6
