= Once in a While (Johnny Mathis album) =

Studio album by Johnny Mathis
- Released: May 23, 1988
- Recorded: December 1987–March 1988
- Studio: Conway Studios, Ocean Way Recording, Ignited Studios, The Grey Room and Kren Studios (Hollywood, California); One On One Studios (North Hollywood, California); Lion Share Recording Studios, The Five Spot and Studio Ultimo (Los Angeles, California)
- Genre: Vocal; pop/rock; R&B
- Length: 39:23
- Label: Columbia
- Producer: Peter Bunetta; Rick Chudacoff; Preston Glass; Robert Kraft

Johnny Mathis chronology
The Hollywood Musicals (1986)	Once in a While (1988)	In the Still of the Night (1989)

Professional ratings
Review scores
Source	Rating
Allmusic	2.5/5 stars

Once in a While is an album by American pop singer Johnny Mathis that was released on May 23, 1988, by Columbia Records and found him returning to the practice of covering contemporary hits but also mixing in lesser-known songs already recorded by other artists along with a few new ones ("Daydreamin'", "From a Whisper to a Scream", "Two Strong Hearts").

Although the album did not make it onto Billboard magazine's Top Pop Albums chart, the song "I'm on the Outside Looking In" did reach number 27 during its 12 weeks on the magazine's list of the 40 Hot Adult Contemporary songs of the week in the US that began in the issue dated July 2 of that year.

== Reception ==
The album received a positive retrospective review from Allmusic, where Bil Carpenter praised the "outstanding street corner-style singing" on the title track and "I'm on the Outside Looking In" and also had kind words for "From a Whisper to a Scream" and "Two Strong Hearts".

== Track listing ==
1. "I'm on the Outside Looking In" (Teddy Randazzo, Bobby Weinstein) – 3:24
2. "It Wouldn't Have Made Any Difference" (Todd Rundgren) – 4:01
3. "Two Strong Hearts" performed with Dionne Warwick (Andy Hill, Bruce Woolley) – 4:00
4. "Once in a While" (Michael Edwards, Bud Green) – 3:28
5. "Fallen" (Lauren Wood) – 3:33
6. "Daydreamin'" (Noel Closson, Preston Glass, Larry Graham) – 4:30
7. "From a Whisper to a Scream" (Steven Birch, Glass) – 4:25
8. "Ain't No Woman (Like the One I've Got)" (Dennis Lambert, Brian Potter) – 4:08
9. "Just Like You" (Jeff Pescetto) – 3:50
10. "Love Brought Us Here Tonight" (Stephen Geyer, Allan Rich, Smokey Robinson) – 4:04

== Recording dates ==
From the liner notes for The Voice of Romance: The Columbia Original Album Collection:

- December 6, 1987 – "Ain't No Woman (Like the One I've Got)", "Daydreamin'", "From a Whisper to a Scream", "Two Strong Hearts"
- December 1987–March 1988 – "Fallen", "I'm on the Outside Looking In", "It Wouldn't Have Made Any Difference", "Just Like You", "Love Brought Us Here Tonight", "Once in a While"

== Song information ==
Tommy Dorsey & His Orchestra spent seven weeks at number one in Billboard magazine in 1937 with "Once in a While", which is the oldest of the songs Mathis covers this time around. "I'm on the Outside Looking In" by Little Anthony and the Imperials reached number 15 on the Billboard Hot 100 and number eight on the magazine's Hot R&B singles chart in 1964. And the recording of "Ain't No Woman (Like the One I've Got)" by The Four Tops earned Gold certification from the Recording Industry Association of America and peaked at number two R&B, number four pop, and number 14 on the magazine's list of the 40 most popular Easy Listening songs of the week in the US in 1973.

Todd Rundgren's "It Wouldn't Have Made Any Difference" first appeared on his 1972 album Something/Anything?, and "Just Like You" was recorded by Dennis Edwards for his 1984 LP Don't Look Any Further. Smokey Robinson included "Love Brought Us Here Tonight" on his 1987 album One Heartbeat, and Lauren Wood's original recording of "Fallen" appeared on her 1981 release Cat Trick but received its widest exposure as one of the songs heard in the 1990 film Pretty Woman and on its soundtrack album, which was released two years after this album and sold 3 million copies. The duet on this album, "Two Strong Hearts" (with Dionne Warwick), was also released as a solo outing in 1988 by John Farnham on his Age of Reason album; his version got as high as number 38 on Billboard magazine's Adult Contemporary chart and number five in Australia.

== Personnel ==
From the liner notes for the original album:

- Johnny Mathis – vocals
- Bill Elliott – keyboards (1–5)
- Preston Glass – keyboards (6–8), drum and percussion programming (6–8)
- Jim Studer – acoustic piano solo (6)
- Robert Kraft – acoustic piano (9, 10), synthesizers (9, 10), additional percussion (10)
- Greg Bartheld – additional synthesizer programming (9, 10)
- Dann Huff – guitars (1–3, 5)
- Michael Thompson – guitars (2, 4)
- Fred Tackett – acoustic guitar (2, 4)
- Nick Brown – guitars (9, 10)
- Rick Chudacoff – bass (1–5)
- Neil Stubenhaus – bass (9, 10)
- Peter Bunetta – drums (1–5)
- Tom Walsh – drums (9, 10)
- Paulinho da Costa – percussion (1–5)
- Jorge Bermudez – live percussion (7), Bermudez triangle (7), percussion (9, 10)
- David Woodford – soprano saxophone (5)
- Michael Paulo – saxophone (9, 10)
- Leslie Smith – backing vocals (1–5)
- Dionne Warwick – vocals (3)
- Lynne Fiddmont – backing vocals (3)
- Syreeta – backing vocals (3)
- Melvin Franklin – backing vocals (4)
- Kipper Jones – backing vocals (4)
- Ricky Nelson – backing vocals (4)
- Roderick White – backing vocals (4)
- Fred White – backing vocals (4)
- Frankie Blue – backing vocals (6–8)
- DeVere Duckett – backing vocals (6–8)
- Joe Ericksen – backing vocals (6–8)
- Craig Thomas – backing vocals (6–8), sax solo (8)
- Sheryl Crow – backing vocals (9, 10)
- Lynn David – backing vocals (9, 10)
- Dorian Holley – backing vocals (9, 10)
- Darryl Phinnessee – backing vocals (9, 10)

=== Production ===
- Jay Landers – executive producer
- Peter Bunetta – producer (1–5)
- Rick Chudacoff – producer (1–5)
- Preston Glass – producer (6–8), arrangements (6–8)
- Robert Kraft – producer (9, 10)
- David Benson – project coordination (9, 10)
- Nancy Donald – design
- Tony Lane – design
- David Vance – photography
- Lore Patterson – styling
- Toluca Lake – wardrobe
- Bobby Yosten – wardrobe

Technical

- Bernie Grundman – mastering at Bernie Grundman Mastering (Hollywood, California)
- Daren Klein – recording (1–5), mixing (10)
- Mick Guzauski – mixing (1–5)
- Maureen Droney – recording (6–8), mixing (6–8)
- Ed Thacker – engineer (9, 10), mixing (9)
- David Benson – technical director (9, 10)
- Tommy Vicari – additional recording (1–5)
- Gary Wagner – additional recording (1–5)
- Frank Wolf – additional recording (1–5)
- Bryant Arnett – assistant engineer (1–5)
- Ray Pyle – assistant engineer (1–5)
- Marnie Riley – assistant engineer (1–5)
- Karen Siegel – assistant engineer (1–5)
- Bernard Frings – assistant engineer (6–8)
- Mitch Zelezny – assistant engineer (6–8)

== Bibliography ==
- Kent, David (1993). Australian Chart Book 1970–1992. St Ives, NSW: Australian Chart Book. ISBN 0-646-11917-6.
- Whitburn, Joel (1986), Joel Whitburn's Pop Memories, 1890-1954, Record Research Inc., ISBN 0898200830
- Whitburn, Joel (2004), Joel Whitburn Presents Top R&B/Hip-Hop Singles, 1942-2004, Record Research Inc., ISBN 0898201608
- Whitburn, Joel (2007), Joel Whitburn Presents Billboard Top Adult Songs, 1961-2006, Record Research Inc., ISBN 0898201691
- Whitburn, Joel (2009), Joel Whitburn's Top Pop Singles, 1955-2008, Record Research Inc., ISBN 0898201802
- Whitburn, Joel (2010), Joel Whitburn Presents Top Pop Albums, Seventh Edition, Record Research Inc., ISBN 0-89820-183-7
