= The Island (album) =

Studio album by Johnny Mathis
- Released: December 8, 2017
- Recorded: August 18, 1989
- Genre: Vocal; Brazilian
- Length: 41:54
- Label: Sony Music Entertainment
- Producer: Sérgio Mendes

Johnny Mathis chronology
In the Still of the Night (1989)	The Island (2017)	In a Sentimental Mood: Mathis Sings Ellington (1990)

Professional ratings
Review scores
Source	Rating
TheSecondDisc.com	positive

The Island is an album by American pop singer Johnny Mathis that was completed for Columbia Records in 1989 but not released in its entirety by parent corporation Sony Music Entertainment until December 8, 2017, when it was included in the Mathis box set The Voice of Romance: The Columbia Original Album Collection. The liner notes for the box set indicate that all of the songs for this album were recorded on August 18, 1989.

== Critical reception ==
In his review of the album, Joe Marchese of The Second Disc opined, "Whether expressing yearning on 'Wanting More' or wistful optimism on 'We Can Try Love Again,' the beautiful music of Brazil inspired some of Johnny’s sweetest vocals of the decade."

== Track listing ==
1. "The Island" (Alan and Marilyn Bergman, Ivan Lins, Vítor Martins) – 4:00
2. "Who's in Love Here" (Lins, Martins, Brenda Russell) – 4:24
3. "Like a Lover" (A. Bergman, M. Bergman, Dori Caymmi, Nelson Motta) – 4:01
4. "So Many Stars" (A. Bergman, M. Bergman, Sérgio Mendes) – 4:02
5. "Photograph" (Caymmi, Paulo César Pinheiro, Tracy Mann) – 4:35
6. "Who's Counting Heartaches" performed with Dionne Warwick (Ina Wolf, Peter Wolf) – 4:20
7. "Your Smile" (Caymmi, Pinheiro, I. Wolf) – 4:26
8. "Wanting More" (Fernando Leporace, Mann) – 3:23
9. "We Can Try Love Again" (Caymmi, Mann) – 4:32
10. "Flower of Bahia" (Caymmi, Mann, Pinheiro) – 4:11

== Personnel ==
Credits are taken from the liner notes for The Voice of Romance: The Columbia Original Album Collection

- Johnny Mathis – vocals
- Sérgio Mendes – producer
- Robbie Buchanan – keyboards; arranger (tracks 2, 6, 7, 8)
- Dori Caymmi – guitar; arranger (except as noted)
- Paulinho da Costa – percussion
- Jimmy Johnson – bass
- Jeff Porcaro – drums
