= Johnny's Mood =

Studio album by Johnny Mathis
- Released: July 18, 1960
- Recorded: September 8, 1959; May 24–26, 1960
- Genre: Vocal
- Length: 44:23
- Label: Columbia
- Producer: Mitch Miller; Al Ham

Johnny Mathis chronology
| Faithfully (1959) | Johnny's Mood (1960) | The Rhythms and Ballads of Broadway (1960) |

Alternate cover
- Second cover issued

Professional ratings
Review scores
| Source | Rating |
|---|---|
| Billboard | positive |
| The Encyclopedia of Popular Music | 4/5 stars |

Johnny's Mood is an album by American pop singer Johnny Mathis that was released on July 18, 1960, by Columbia Records and mixes new material in with covers of hit standards by other artists.

The original album cover featured a sketch of Mathis on an orange background, but a second cover with his headshot against an orange background was also released.

The album made its debut on Billboard magazine's album chart in the August 29, 1960, issue and got as high as number four over the course of 65 weeks.

The 1959 Mathis LP Faithfully and Johnny's Mood were both released for the first time on compact disc on June 21, 2002, as two albums on one CD. Johnny's Mood was also included in Legacy's Mathis box set The Voice of Romance: The Columbia Original Album Collection, which was released on December 8, 2017.

== Reception ==
Billboard had good things to say. "Johnny Mathis is right at home in this collection of mood items, and at the top of his form he's one of the most potent chanters around."

== Track listing ==
=== Side one ===
1. "I'm Gonna Laugh You Right Out of My Life" (Cy Coleman, Joseph McCarthy) – 3:35
2. "Stay Warm" (Buddy Greco) – 3:13
3. "There's No You" (Tom Adair, George Durgom, Hal Hopper) – 3:55
4. "How High the Moon" from Two for the Show (Nancy Hamilton, Morgan Lewis) – 3:22
5. "I'm So Lost" (Shirley Cowell) – 3:52
6. "Once" (Otis G. Clements, Sydney Shaw) – 3:47

=== Side two ===
1. "Goodnight My Love" from Stowaway (Mack Gordon Harry Revel) – 3:42
2. "The Folks Who Live On the Hill" from High, Wide, and Handsome (Jerome Kern, Oscar Hammerstein II) – 3:50
3. "April in Paris" from Walk a Little Faster (Vernon Duke E. Y. Harburg) – 3:35
4. "Corner to Corner" (Robert Marcus, Harold Mott) – 3:05
5. "In Return" (Leon Carr, Paul Vance) – 3:27
6. "I'm in the Mood for Love" from Every Night at Eight (Jimmy McHugh, Dorothy Fields) – 5:00

== Recording dates ==
From the liner notes for The Voice of Romance: The Columbia Original Album Collection:

- September 8, 1959 — "Once"
- May 24, 1960 — "Corner to Corner", "How High the Moon", "I'm in the Mood for Love", "There's No You"
- May 25, 1960 — "The Folks Who Live On the Hill", "Goodnight My Love", "I'm Gonna Laugh You Right Out of My Life"
- May 26, 1960 — "April in Paris", "I'm So Lost", "In Return", "Stay Warm"

== Personnel ==
- Johnny Mathis – vocals
- Mitch Miller – producer (except as noted)
- Al Ham – producer ("Once")
- Glenn Osser – arranger and conductor

== Bibliography ==
- Whitburn, Joel (2010), Joel Whitburn Presents Top Pop Albums, Seventh Edition, Record Research Inc., ISBN 0-89820-183-7
