= Warm (Johnny Mathis album) =

Studio album by Johnny Mathis
- Released: November 11, 1957
- Recorded: October 22–24, 1957
- Studio: CBS 30th Street Studio; New York City
- Genre: Vocal
- Length: 41:45
- Label: Columbia
- Producer: Mitch Miller; Al Ham

Johnny Mathis chronology
Wonderful, Wonderful (1957)	Warm (1957)	Good Night, Dear Lord (1958)

Professional ratings
Review scores
Source	Rating
Allmusic	3/5 stars
The Encyclopedia of Popular Music	3/5 stars

Warm is the third album by American pop singer Johnny Mathis that was released on November 11, 1957, by Columbia Records and, as with his previous LP, Wonderful Wonderful, does not include any of his hit singles but instead focuses primarily on his interpretations of romantic ballads that were already hits for other artists. Two new songs made the final cut, however: the title track and "The Lovely Things You Do".

The album made its first appearance on Billboard magazine's list of the 25 Best-Selling Pop LPs in the US in its December 23, 1957, issue and remained on the chart for 113 weeks, four of which were spent at number two. The album debuted on the Cashbox albums chart in the issue dated December 14, 1957, and remained on the chart for 32 weeks, spending two weeks at number one. It was the first Johnny Mathis album to chart in the UK, peaking at number six in November 1958, and received Gold certification from the Recording Industry Association of America for sales of 500,000 copies in the US on May 5, 1960.

The album was initially released in the monaural format but became available in stereo in 1958. It was issued in the UK by Fontana Records and was released for the first time on compact disc in 2000 as one of two albums on one CD along with his 1958 LP Swing Softly. Warm was also included in Legacy's Mathis box set The Voice of Romance: The Columbia Original Album Collection, which was released on December 8, 2017.

== Reception ==
J. T. Griffith of Allmusic wrote, "The album is an example of the classic romantic mood that made Mathis a superstar." His summation reveals that he was especially taken by the song that gave the album its name: "A classic Mathis album with a title track that ranks with 'Misty' as one of his best."

== Track listing ==
=== Side one ===
1. "Warm" (Sid Jacobson, Jimmy Krondes) – 3:24
2. "My One and Only Love" (Robert Mellin, Guy Wood) – 3:37
3. "Baby, Baby, Baby" (Mack David, Jerry Livingston) – 3:00
4. "A Handful of Stars" (Jack Lawrence, Ted Shapiro) – 3:20
5. "By Myself" (Howard Dietz, Arthur Schwartz) – 4:09
6. "I've Grown Accustomed to Her Face" from My Fair Lady (Frederick Loewe, Alan Jay Lerner) – 3:29

=== Side two ===
1. "Then I'll Be Tired of You" (Yip Harburg, Arthur Schwartz) – 4:07
2. "I'm Glad There Is You" (Jimmy Dorsey, Paul Madeira) – 4:04
3. "What'll I Do" (Irving Berlin) – 2:55
4. "The Lovely Things You Do" (Alex Fogarty) – 3:18
5. "There Goes My Heart" (Benny Davies, Abner Silver) – 3:40
6. "While We're Young" (William Engvick, Alec Wilder, Morty Palitz) – 2:42

== Recording dates ==
From the liner notes for The Voice of Romance: The Columbia Original Album Collection:

- October 22, 1957 — "Baby, Baby, Baby", "There Goes My Heart", "What'll I Do", "While We're Young"
- October 23, 1957 — "I'm Glad There Is You", "I've Grown Accustomed to Her Face", "The Lovely Things You Do", "My One and Only Love"
- October 24, 1957 — "By Myself", "A Handful of Stars", "Then I'll Be Tired of You", "Warm"

== Personnel ==
- Johnny Mathis – vocals
- Mitch Miller – producer
- Al Ham – producer
- Percy Faith – arranger and conductor
- Normand Menard/Graham Associates – photography

== Bibliography ==
- Whitburn, Joel (2010), Joel Whitburn Presents Top Pop Albums, Seventh Edition, Record Research Inc., ISBN 0-89820-183-7
- Hoffmann, Frank W (1988), The Cash box album charts, 1955-1974, Scarecrow Press, ISBN 0-810-82005-6
