= Up, Up and Away (Johnny Mathis album) =

Up, Up And Away

Studio album by Johnny Mathis
- Released: October 23, 1967
- Recorded: May 15, 1967; September 25–26, 1967; September 28, 1967
- Genre: Vocal; pop/rock
- Length: 36:54
- Label: Columbia
- Producer: Robert Mersey

Johnny Mathis chronology
Johnny Mathis Sings (1967)	Up, Up And Away (1967)	Love Is Blue (1968)

Up, Up And Away is an album by American pop singer Johnny Mathis that was released on October 23, 1967, and was the first LP he recorded upon returning to his first record label, Columbia Records, where he then stayed for several decades after having just completed a four-year sojourn with Mercury Records. The title track starts the album on the contemporary end of the spectrum of material covered here, but Mathis also includes a standard from the 1940s ("The More I See You"), a hit that charted twice for the same artist in the 1950s ("Morning Side of the Mountain"), a trio of songs from Doctor Dolittle ("At the Crossroads", "When I Look in Your Eyes", and "Where Are the Words"), and two songs that had lyrics added after originating as instrumentals: "Drifting" began as part of the score to the 1958 film Auntie Mame, and "Far Above Cayuga's Waters" was "a theme song of Cornell University before saxophonist Dave Pell retooled it and Sammy Cahn adapted the delightful fairytale-like lyrics."

One song from the album, "Misty Roses", spent two weeks at number 40 on Billboard magazine's list of the 40 most popular Easy Listening songs in the US in September of that year. The album made its first appearance on their Top LPs chart in the issue dated December 23 of that year to begin a 20-week stay, during which time it got as high as number 60, and began four weeks on their Best Selling Rhythm & Blues LPs chart in the following issue, dated December 30, which included a peak position at number 19.

Up, Up And Away was released on compact disc in 2009 as one of two albums on one CD, the second of the two being its 1968 follow-up, Love Is Blue. Up, Up And Away was also included in Legacy's Mathis box set The Voice of Romance: The Columbia Original Album Collection, which was released on December 8, 2017.

== Reception ==
Professional ratings
Review scores
Source	Rating
Billboard	positive
The Encyclopedia of Popular Music	3/5 stars

Billboard was enthusiastic in its description of the album. "Johnny Mathis's return to the Columbia label purrs with the rich, romantic tones that suspend the very sensation of conscious listening." A few tracks in particular stood out for them. "'Up, Up and Away', 'Misty Roses', and 'I Won't Cry Anymore' are soothed and coated with Mathis's seamless style – music running together like prefabricated daydreams padded with a feeling of luxury."

== Track listing ==
=== Side one ===
1. "Up, Up and Away" (Jimmy Webb) – 2:54
2. "The More I See You" (Mack Gordon, Harry Warren) – 4:03
3. "Where Are the Words" from Doctor Dolittle (Leslie Bricusse) – 2:50
4. "Morning Side of the Mountain" (Dick Manning, Larry Stock) – 4:21
5. "I Won't Cry Anymore" (Al Frisch, Fred Wise) – 3:30
6. "Far Above Cayuga's Waters" (lyrics adapted by Sammy Cahn) – 3:37

=== Side two ===
1. "Misty Roses" (Tim Hardin) – 2:43
2. "Drifting" (Kim Gannon, Bronisław Kaper) – 3:27
3. "At the Crossroads" from Doctor Dolittle (Leslie Bricusse) – 2:59
4. "I Thought of You Last Night" (Ralph Freed) – 3:04
5. "When I Look in Your Eyes" from Doctor Dolittle (Leslie Bricusse) – 3:26

== Recording dates ==
From the liner notes for The Voice of Romance: The Columbia Original Album Collection:

- May 15, 1967 – "Misty Roses"
- September 25, 1967 – "Drifting", "The More I See You", "When I Look in Your Eyes", "Where Are the Words"
- September 26, 1967 – "At the Crossroads", "I Thought of You Last Night", "I Won't Cry Anymore", "Morning Side of the Mountain"
- September 28, 1967 – "Far Above Cayuga's Waters", "Up, Up and Away"

== Personnel ==
- Johnny Mathis – vocals
- Glenn Osser – arranger, conductor (except where noted)
- Robert Mersey – arranger, conductor ("Misty Roses"); producer
- Frank Laico – engineer
- Stan Weiss – engineer

== Bibliography ==
- Whitburn, Joel (1999), Joel Whitburn's Top R&B Albums, 1965-1998, Record Research Inc., ISBN 0898201349
- Whitburn, Joel (2007), Joel Whitburn Presents Billboard Top Adult Songs, 1961-2006, Record Research Inc., ISBN 0898201691
- Whitburn, Joel (2010), Joel Whitburn Presents Top Pop Albums, Seventh Edition, Record Research Inc., ISBN 0-89820-183-7
