= Mathis Magic =

Studio album by Johnny Mathis
- Released: September 17, 1979
- Recorded: June 5, 1979; July 9, 1979; July 23, 1979; September 5, 1979
- Studio: A&M, Hollywood
- Genre: Vocal
- Length: 41:03
- Label: Columbia
- Producer: Jack Gold

Johnny Mathis chronology
The Best Days of My Life (1979)	Mathis Magic (1979)	Tears and Laughter (1980)

Professional ratings
Review scores
Source	Rating
Billboard	Recommended
The Encyclopedia of Popular Music	3/5 stars

Mathis Magic is an album by American pop singer Johnny Mathis that was released on September 17, 1979, by Columbia Records and contained an equal balance of new material and songs associated with other artists.

Although this album did not make any appearances on Billboard magazine's Top LPs & Tapes chart, it did reach number 59 during a four-week run on the UK album chart. On December 31 of that year the British Phonographic Industry awarded the album with Silver certification for sales of 60,000 units in the UK.

On January 27, 2015, Funkytowngrooves gave Mathis Magic its first pressing on compact disc as one of two albums on one CD, the other album being Mathis's Columbia release from March 1978, You Light Up My Life.

== Reception ==
People's review praises the album's disco arrangements of "Night and Day", "That Old Black Magic", and "To the Ends of the Earth": "While other singers have embarrassed themselves redoing such hallowed material, Mathis makes it work." The reviewer concludes, "Twenty-two years after his first hit, 'Wonderful, Wonderful', Mathis' voice and phrasing are as ingratiating as ever."

== Track listing ==
=== Side one ===
1. "No One but the One You Love" (Cheryl Christiansen, Arnold Goland, Jack Gold) – 3:14
2. "Night and Day" from Gay Divorce (Cole Porter) – 5:03
3. "Love" (Gerard Kenny, Drey Shepperd) – 3:48
4. "My Body Keeps Changing My Mind" (Leslie Pearl) – 3:42
5. "New York State of Mind" (Billy Joel) – 5:18

=== Side two ===
1. "She Believes in Me" (Steve Gibb) – 4:22
2. "That Old Black Magic" (Harold Arlen, Johnny Mercer) – 5:43
3. "You Saved My Life" performed with Stephanie Lawrence (Chris Arnold, Geoff Morrow) – 2:50
4. "To the Ends of the Earth" (Joe Sherman, Noel Sherman) – 2:53
5. "Heart, Soul, Body and Mind" (Ben Peters) – 4:10

== Recording dates ==
From the liner notes for The Voice of Romance: The Columbia Original Album Collection:

- June 5, 1979 – "Night and Day", "That Old Black Magic"
- July 9, 1979 – "No One but the One You Love", "She Believes in Me", "You Saved My Life"
- July 23, 1979 – "Heart, Soul, Body and Mind", "Love", "My Body Keeps Changing My Mind", "To the Ends of the Earth"
- September 5, 1979 – "New York State of Mind"

== Personnel ==
From the liner notes for the original album:

- Johnny Mathis – vocals
- Stephanie Lawrence – vocals ("You Saved My Life"), vocal harmony ("No One but the One You Love")
- Jack Gold – producer
- Gene Page – arranger, conductor
- Dick Bogert – engineer
- Jo-Anne Steinberg – production coordinator
- David Vance – photographer
- Michael Boddicker – synthesizer ("Night and Day", "To the Ends of the Earth")
- Eddie "Bongo" Brown – congas ("Night and Day", "That Old Black Magic", "To the Ends of the Earth")
- Oscar Brashear – flugelhorn ("New York State of Mind")
- Terry Harrington – tenor saxophone ("That Old Black Magic")
- Paul Smith – piano ("New York State of Mind")

== Bibliography ==
- Whitburn, Joel (1986), Joel Whitburn's Pop Memories, 1890-1954, Record Research Inc., ISBN 0898200830
- Whitburn, Joel (2002), Joel Whitburn's Top Country Singles, 1944-2001, Record Research Inc., ISBN 0898201519
- Whitburn, Joel (2007), Joel Whitburn Presents Billboard Top Adult Songs, 1961-2006, Record Research Inc., ISBN 978-0898201697
- Whitburn, Joel (2009), Joel Whitburn's Top Pop Singles, 1955-2008, Record Research Inc., ISBN 978-0898201802
