= The Best Days of My Life =

Studio album by Johnny Mathis
- Released: January 29, 1979
- Recorded: August 23, 1978; September 5, 1978; September 14, 1978; September 15, 1978; November 10, 1978
- Studio: A&M Recording Studios, Hollywood, California
- Genre: Vocal
- Length: 37:45
- Label: Columbia
- Producer: Jack Gold

Johnny Mathis chronology
That's What Friends Are For (1978)	The Best Days of My Life (1979)	Mathis Magic (1979)

The Best Days of My Life is an album by American pop singer Johnny Mathis, released on January 29, 1979, by Columbia Records. He scaled back considerably on his more than decade-long practice of recording recent hit songs by other artists. He did, however, cover two standards: "As Time Goes By" and "Begin the Beguine", the latter of which is given a disco arrangement.

The album made its first appearance on Billboard magazine's Top LP's & Tapes chart in the issue dated February 24, 1979, and remained there for seven weeks, peaking at number 122. It also made it to number 38 during a five-week run on the UK album chart.

The first song from the album to reach any of the charts in Billboard was a duet with Jane Olivor titled "The Last Time I Felt Like This" that was written for the 1978 film Same Time, Next Year and was nominated for the Academy Award for Best Original Song but lost to "Last Dance" from Thank God It's Friday. The duet entered the magazine's list of the 50 most popular Easy Listening records in the US in the issue dated February 24, 1979, and peaked at number 15 over the course of 12 weeks. Another track from the album, "Begin the Beguine", entered that same chart five months later, in the July 21 issue, and got as high as number 37 during its five weeks there. The only song from the album to reach the UK singles chart was "Gone, Gone, Gone", which made its debut there the following month, on August 11, and reached number 15 during a 10-week run.

The album was first released on compact disc in 1989, and on January 27, 2015, Funkytowngrooves released an expanded edition of the album on compact disc that included five bonus tracks, two of which were disco mixes that came out in 1979 on a separate 12-inch single.

== Critical reception ==
Professional ratings
Review scores
Source	Rating
AllMusic	3/5 stars
Billboard	positive
The Encyclopedia of Popular Music	3/5 stars

People said in its review that "Mathis here returns to the venue that best suits his soft and breathy style" (meaning ballads). The reviewer also references characters in the 1942 film Casablanca in praising the Mathis rendition of "As Time Goes By": "If Sam had sung it so well, Bogey would actually have uttered that famous nonline, 'Play it again.'"

== Track listing ==
=== Side one ===
1. "Would You Like to Spend the Night with Me" (L. Russell Brown, Irwin Levine) – 3:02
2. "As Time Goes By" (Herman Hupfeld) – 4:35
3. "The Best Days of My Life" (Cheryl Christiansen, Arnold Goland, Jack Gold) – 3:30
4. "Gone, Gone, Gone" (L. Russell Brown, Lisa Hayward) – 3:32
5. "The Bottom Line" (Dennis Lambert, Brian Potter) – 3:56

=== Side two ===
1. "The Last Time I Felt Like This" performed with Jane Olivor (Alan Bergman, Marilyn Bergman, Marvin Hamlisch) – 2:57
2. "Begin the Beguine" (Cole Porter) – 4:16
3. "How Can I Make It on My Own" (Terry Bradford, Nat Kipner) – 4:00
4. "There You Are" (Nancy Goland) – 4:12
5. "We're in Love" (Patti Austin) – 3:45

=== Remixes ===
A separate 12-inch single that featured extended dance mixes of two songs from the album was also released in 1979.

Side one

1. "Begin the Beguine" (Special Disco Version) (Cole Porter) – 8:28
  - Disco Mix by Steve Thompson
  - Engineered by Michael Barbiero

Side two

1. "Gone, Gone, Gone" (Special Disco Version) (L. Russell Brown, Lisa Hayward) – 6:30
  - Disco Mix by John Luongo
  - Engineered by Michael Barbiero

=== Funkytowngrooves CD bonus tracks ===
From the liner notes for the 2014 CD release:

1. "Begin the Beguine" (Single Mix) (Porter) – 3:56
2. "Begin the Beguine" (Disco Mix) (Porter) – 8:28
3. "Gone, Gone, Gone" (Disco Mix) (L. Russell Brown, Lisa Hayward) – 6:29
4. "Begin the Beguine" (Instrumental) (Porter) – 3:56
5. "I Never Said I Love You" (Hal David, Archie Jordan) – 3:38

=== 2017 CD bonus track ===
This album's CD release as part of the 2017 box set The Voice of Romance: The Columbia Original Album Collection also included "I Never Said I Love You".

== Recording dates ==
From the liner notes for The Voice of Romance: The Columbia Original Album Collection:

- August 23, 1978 – "How Can I Make It on My Own", "I Never Said I Love You"
- September 5, 1978 – "As Time Goes By", "Would You Like to Spend the Night with Me"
- September 14, 1978 – "The Bottom Line", "There You Are", "We're in Love"
- September 15, 1978 – "Begin the Beguine", "Gone, Gone, Gone", "The Last Time I Felt Like This"
- November 10, 1978 – "The Best Days of My Life"

== Song information ==
The liner notes included with the Funkytowngrooves reissue featured a 2014 interview with one of the songwriters of "The Bottom Line", Dennis Lambert, in which he describes the excitement that he and the song's other composer, Brian Potter, felt about the decision to include their song on the album. "'It was one of the highlights of our career as songwriters and remains so to this day. His version...was exactly what we were hoping it would be."

== Personnel ==
=== Original album ===
From the liner notes for the original album:

Performers

- Johnny Mathis – vocals
- Jane Olivor – vocals ("The Last Time I Felt Like This")
- Bill Green – saxophone solo ("The Bottom Line")
- Plas Johnson – saxophone solo ("As Time Goes By")
- Greg Phillinganes – synthesizer solo ("Would You Like to Spend the Night with Me", "There You Are")

Production

- Jack Gold – producer
- Gene Page – arranger, conductor
- Dick Bogert – recording engineer, mixing engineer
- Ray Gerhardt – recording engineer
- Larry Forkner – recording engineer
- Jo-Anne Steinberg – production coordinator
- David Vance – photographer
- Mixed at Hollywood Sound

=== Funkytowngrooves reissue ===
From the liner notes for the 2014 CD release:

- Tony Calvert – reissue producer
- Jeff James – reissue coordinator
- Matt Murphy – production manager
- Craig Turnbull - release coordinator
- Wallace Create – package design
- Alex Henderson – liner notes
- Matt Bauer - liner notes and research
- Randy Mahon - artist/musician interview coordinator
- Mastered by Sean Brennan at Battery Studios, New York City, from the original master tapes

== Bibliography ==
- Whitburn, Joel (1986), Joel Whitburn's Pop Memories, 1890-1954, Record Research Inc., ISBN 0898200830
- Whitburn, Joel (2004), Joel Whitburn Presents Top R&B/Hip-Hop Singles, 1942-2004, Record Research Inc., ISBN 0898201608
- Whitburn, Joel (2007), Joel Whitburn Presents Billboard Top Adult Songs, 1961-2006, Record Research Inc., ISBN 978-0898201697
- Whitburn, Joel (2009), Joel Whitburn's Top Pop Singles, 1955-2008, Record Research Inc., ISBN 0898201802
- Whitburn, Joel (2010), Joel Whitburn Presents Top Pop Albums, Seventh Edition, Record Research Inc., ISBN 978-0-89820-183-3
- Wiley, Mason; Bona, Damien (1996), Inside Oscar: The Unofficial History of the Academy Awards, Ballantine Books, ISBN 0345400534
