= Love Is Blue (Johnny Mathis album) =

Studio album by Johnny Mathis
- Released: March 6, 1968
- Recorded: January 23–24, 1968; February 3, 1968
- Genre: Vocal; pop/rock
- Length: 30:04
- Label: Columbia
- Producer: Robert Mersey

Johnny Mathis chronology
Up, Up and Away (1967)	Love Is Blue (1968)	Those Were the Days (1968)

Singles from Love Is Blue
- 1. "Venus" Released: April 11, 1968

Love Is Blue is an album by American pop singer Johnny Mathis that was released on March 6, 1968, by Columbia Records and adhered even more strictly to the concept of the "cover" album of recent hits than its predecessor in that five of the 10 songs selected for the project ("I Say a Little Prayer", "By the Time I Get to Phoenix", "The Look of Love", "Never My Love", and the title track) were chart hits for the original artists within the previous year and another three ("Moon River", "Walk On By", and "Venus") had charted within the previous decade. Even the two remaining selections that did not bring chart success to the original artists were by the hit songwriting teams of Burt Bacharach and Hal David ("Don't Go Breakin' My Heart") and John Lennon and Paul McCartney ("Here, There and Everywhere") and left no room for the usual inclusion of some original songs or material from Broadway.

Love Is Blue was released on compact disc in 2009 as one of two albums on one CD, the other LP being Up, Up And Away. Love Is Blue was also included in Legacy's Mathis box set The Voice of Romance: The Columbia Original Album Collection, which was released on December 8, 2017.

== Chart performance ==
The album debuted on the Billboard Top LPs chart in the issue dated April 13. 1968, reaching number 26 over the course of 40 weeks. It made it to number 44 on the magazine's Best Selling Rhythm & Blues LPs chart during the six weeks it spent there that began in the July 6 issue. It debuted on the Cash Box albums chart in the issue dated March 30, 1968, and remained on the chart for 23 weeks, peaking at number 25.

The cover of Frankie Avalon's "Venus" "bubbled under" the Billboard Hot 100 to number 111 during its one week on the chart in the issue dated June 22, 1968, the same issue in which it also began its three weeks on the Easy Listening songs chart, where it peaked at number 23.

== Reception ==
Professional ratings
Review scores
Source	Rating
AllMusic	3.5/5 stars
Billboard	positive
The Encyclopedia of Popular Music	3/5 stars

In his review of the album, Lindsay Planer of AllMusic compared several of the Mathis covers here to the original hits, such as "Moon River", which he found to be "arguably besting Andy Williams's on sheer emotive tone." He had similar praise for "By the Time I Get to Phoenix": "When compared to [Glen] Campbell, Mathis imbues the material with a more understated and subtle empathy." He noted that "the entry that is most dissimilar to its origins" is "Here, There and Everywhere". "The slowed tempo and copious orchestration turn the melody into an epic torch song, as opposed to the less heavy-handed treatment by the Beatles" and adds that the rendition of The Association's "Never My Love" "retains a similarly light and otherwise unaffected overhaul." Planer also finds on the title track that "Paul Mauriat's upbeat Baroque flavor is all but forgotten as Mathis chooses passion over strictly pop in his excellent delivery."

Upon the album's 1968 release, Billboard also had high praise. "Mathis has come up with a repertoire of top tunes that fit excellently into his warm, romantic styling."

== Track listing ==
=== Side one ===
1. "I Say a Little Prayer" (Burt Bacharach, Hal David) - 2:17
2. "By the Time I Get to Phoenix" (Jimmy Webb) - 3:18
3. "The Look of Love" from Casino Royale (Burt Bacharach, Hal David) - 3:45
4. "Don't Go Breakin' My Heart" (Burt Bacharach, Hal David) - 2:24
5. "Here, There and Everywhere" (John Lennon, Paul McCartney) - 3:37

=== Side two ===
1. "Never My Love" (Dick Addrisi, Don Addrisi) - 2:41
2. "Moon River" from Breakfast at Tiffany's (Henry Mancini, Johnny Mercer) - 3:07
3. "Walk On By" (Burt Bacharach, Hal David) - 3:03
4. "Venus" (Ed Marshall) - 2:40
5. "Love Is Blue" (Bryan Blackburn, Pierre Corr, Andre Popp) - 3:12

== Recording dates ==
From the liner notes for The Voice of Romance: The Columbia Original Album Collection:

- January 23, 1968 – "By the Time I Get to Phoenix", "Here, There and Everywhere", "The Look of Love"
- January 24, 1968 – "I Say a Little Prayer", "Love Is Blue", "Never My Love"
- February 3, 1968 – "Don't Go Breakin' My Heart", "Moon River", "Venus", "Walk On By"

== Personnel ==
- Johnny Mathis – vocals
- Robert Mersey – arranger, conductor, producer
- Frank Laico – engineer
- Glen Kolotkin – engineer
- Frank Bez – photography

== Bibliography ==
- Whitburn, Joel (1999), Joel Whitburn's Top R&B Albums, 1965-1998, Record Research Inc., ISBN 0898201349
- Whitburn, Joel (2007), Joel Whitburn Presents Billboard Top Adult Songs, 1961-2006, Record Research Inc., ISBN 0898201691
- Whitburn, Joel (2009), Joel Whitburn's Top Pop Singles, 1955-2008, Record Research Inc., ISBN 0898201802
- Whitburn, Joel (2010), Joel Whitburn Presents Top Pop Albums, Seventh Edition, Record Research Inc., ISBN 0-89820-183-7
- Hoffmann, Frank W (1988), The Cash box album charts, 1955-1974, Scarecrow Press, ISBN 0-810-82005-6
