= Swing Softly =

Studio album by Johnny Mathis
- Released: July 28, 1958 (mono); August 18, 1958 (stereo)
- Recorded: May 15–16, 1958; June 17, 1958
- Studio: CBS 30th Street Studio; New York City
- Genre: Vocal
- Length: 31:53
- Label: Columbia
- Producer: Mitch Miller; Al Ham

Johnny Mathis chronology
Johnny's Greatest Hits (1958)	Swing Softly (1958)	Merry Christmas (1958)

Swing Softly is the fifth album by American pop singer Johnny Mathis that was released on July 28, 1958, by Columbia Records and was a departure from the ballads that accounted for the vast majority of singles and album tracks he had recorded thus far. This project features uptempo arrangements of popular standards, most of which originated in a movie or stage musicals, and a couple of new songs: "To Be in Love" and "Easy to Say (But Hard to Do)".

The album made its first appearance on Billboard magazine's list of the 25 Best-Selling Pop LPs in the US in the issue dated September 8, 1958, and peaked at number six over the course of 16 weeks. It also spent its sole week on the UK album chart at number 10 and received Gold certification from the Recording Industry Association of America for sales of 500,000 copies in the US on December 4, 1962.

The album was released for the first time on compact disc in 2000 as one of two albums on one CD, the other LP being another of his Gold records, Warm from 1957. Swing Softly was also included in Legacy's Mathis box set The Voice of Romance: The Columbia Original Album Collection, which was released on December 8, 2017.

== Reception ==
Professional ratings
Review scores
Source	Rating
AllMusic	4/5 stars
The Encyclopedia of Popular Music	3/5 stars

AllMusic's Greg Adams wrote: "Close listeners will appreciate the purity of Mathis's vocal technique, which differs markedly from that of later singers for its infrequent use of modulation...Mathis swings with ease on these twelve favorites and offers something a little bit different from his previous albums."

== Track listing ==
=== Side one ===
1. "You Hit the Spot" from Collegiate (Mack Gordon, Harry Revel) – 2:52
2. "It's De-Lovely" from Red Hot and Blue (Cole Porter) – 2:47
3. "Get Me to the Church on Time" from My Fair Lady (Alan Jay Lerner, Frederick Loewe) – 1:45
4. "Like Someone in Love" from Belle of the Yukon (Johnny Burke, Jimmy Van Heusen) – 2:40
5. "You'd Be So Nice to Come Home To" from Something to Shout About (Porter) – 2:12
6. "Love Walked In" from The Goldwyn Follies (George Gershwin, Ira Gershwin) – 2:38

=== Side two ===
1. "This Heart of Mine" from Ziegfeld Follies (Arthur Freed, Harry Warren) – 2:31
2. "To Be in Love" (Bart Howard) – 3:01
3. "Sweet Lorraine" (Clifford Burrell, Mitchell Parish) – 2:24
4. "Can't Get Out of This Mood" from Seven Days' Leave (Frank Loesser, Jimmy McHugh) – 3:08
5. "I've Got the World on a String" (Harold Arlen, Ted Koehler) – 3:11
6. "Easy to Say (But So Hard to Do)" (Marvin Fisher, Jack Segal) – 2:44

== Recording dates ==
From the liner notes for The Voice of Romance: The Columbia Original Album Collection:

- May 15, 1958 — "Can't Get Out of This Mood", "Like Someone in Love", "To Be in Love", "You'd Be So Nice to Come Home To"
- May 16, 1958 — "Easy to Say (But Hard to Do)", "I've Got the World on a String", "It's De-Lovely", "Love Walked In"
- June 17, 1958 — "Get Me to the Church on Time", "Sweet Lorraine", "This Heart of Mine", "You Hit the Spot"

== Personnel ==
- Johnny Mathis – vocals
- Mitch Miller – producer
- Al Ham – producer
- Percy Faith – arranger and conductor
- Friedman Abeles – photography

== Bibliography ==
- Whitburn, Joel (2010), Joel Whitburn Presents Top Pop Albums, Seventh Edition, Record Research Inc., ISBN 0-89820-183-7
