= In the Still of the Night (album) =

Studio album by Johnny Mathis
- Released: August 8, 1989
- Recorded: May–November 1988
- Studio: Alpha Studios, Burbank, California , Conway Studios, Hollywood, California, Smoketree Studio, Chatsworth, California
- Genre: Vocal; R&B
- Length: 39:23
- Label: Columbia
- Producer: Peter Bunetta; Rick Chudacoff

Johnny Mathis chronology
Once in a While (1988)	In the Still of the Night (1989)	The Island (1989)

In the Still of the Night is an album by American pop singer Johnny Mathis that was released on August 8, 1989, by Columbia Records and continues the trend that began with his 1986 collaboration with Henry Mancini, The Hollywood Musicals, in that the project is devoted to a specific theme that ties the songs together. Mathis hints at the theme for this album in the liner notes for his 1993 box set The Music of Johnny Mathis: A Personal Collection, where he gives his thoughts on the 1964 Little Anthony and the Imperials song "I'm on the Outside Looking In" that he covered for his 1988 album Once in a While: "That was group singers' kind of material. I was singing other stuff. It wasn't the picture of the lone crooner standing in the spotlight. That's what I was doing when all this other stuff was going on. I never listened to it until it was brought to my attention by [that album's producers] Peter Bunetta and Rick Chudacoff." Mathis chose to continue his work with Bunetta and Chudacoff on this project, which focuses on "this other stuff" that Mathis refers to: pop and R&B hits from the 1950s and 1960s.

== Reception ==
Professional ratings
Review scores
Source	Rating
AllMusic	3/5 stars

Although the album did not make it onto Billboard magazine's Top Pop Albums chart, it did receive praise in People, where the reviewer remarks that Mathis and the album producers "make these songs sound reconsidered, not merely recycled." It's also noted that "Mathis's ability to extract every last nuance from a lyric has never been employed to better advantage" and that "Take 6's presence enables him to prove that he can keep up with the younger generation."

The album also received a positive retrospective review from AllMusic, where Bil Carpenter noted the "clean, uncomplicated orchestration," and deemed it "one of Mathis's best recordings to date."

== Track listing ==
No.	Title	Writer(s)	Length
1.	"In the Still of the Night" (featuring Take 6)	Fred Parris	2:38
2.	"It's All in the Game" (featuring Take 6)	Charles Dawes, Carl Sigman	2:33
3.	"Since I Fell for You"	Buddy Johnson	3:09
4.	"You Belong to Me"	Pee Wee King, Chilton Price, Redd Stewart	3:40
5.	"True Love Ways"	Buddy Holly, Norman Petty	2:58
6.	"Since I Don't Have You"	James Beaumont, Walter Lester, Joseph Rock, John Taylor, Joseph Verscharen, Janet Vogel	2:39
7.	"Then You Can Tell Me Goodbye"	John D. Loudermilk	4:37
8.	"The End of the World"	Sylvia Dee, Arthur Kent	3:07
9.	"All Alone Am I"	Arthur Altman, Manos Hadjidakis	3:24
10.	"For Your Love"	Ed Townsend	3:37

== Recording dates ==
From the liner notes for The Voice of Romance: The Columbia Original Album Collection:

- May 1988–December 1988 – "All Alone Am I", "The End of the World", "Since I Don't Have You", "Then You Can Tell Me Goodbye", "True Love Ways", "You Belong to Me"
- July 27, 1988 – "For Your Love", "In the Still of the Night", "It's All in the Game", "Since I Fell for You"

== Personnel ==
From the liner notes for the original album:

- Jay Landers – executive producer
- Peter Bunetta – producer
- Rick Chudacoff – producer
- Cedric Dent – arrangements (background vocals)
- Mervyn Warren – arrangements (background vocals)
- Gary Brandt – recording engineer
- Marc Ettel – recording engineer
- Daren Klein – recording engineer
- Frank Wolf – recording engineer
- Mick Guzauski – mixing at Conway Studios (Hollywood, California)
- Bernie Grundman – mastering at Bernie Grundman Mastering (Hollywood, California)
- Don Adey – assistant engineer (Alpha)
- Bryant Arnett – assistant engineer (Conway)
- Kristen Connolly – assistant engineer (Smoketree)
- Richard McKernan – assistant engineer (Conway)
- Marnie Riley – assistant engineer (Conway)
- Steve Satkowski – assistant engineer (Alpha)
- 24 Collection and Bal Harbour – wardrobe
- Kyle Plyer – styling
- Deev – grooming
- Rebecca Chamlee Keeley – art direction
- David Vance – photography

=== Musicians and Vocals ===
- Johnny Mathis – vocals
- Brad Cole – keyboards
- Bill Elliott – keyboards
- Reginald "Sonny" Burke – organ
- Dann Huff – guitars
- Rick Chudacoff – bass
- Peter Bunetta – drums
- David Woodford – baritone saxophone, flute
- John Helliwell – clarinet, tenor saxophone
- Doug Norwine – tenor saxophone
- Jimmy Roberts – tenor saxophone
- Garrett Adkins – trombone
- Rick Braun – trumpets
- Darrell Leonard – trumpet
- Amy Shulman – harp
- Take 6 (Alvin Chea, Cedric Dent, Mark Kibble, Claude McKnight III, David Thomas and Mervyn Warren) – backing vocals, featured vocals (1, 2)
- Melvin Franklin – backing vocals
- Mara Getz – backing vocals
- Leslie Smith – backing vocals

== Bibliography ==
- Whitburn, Joel (1994), Joel Whitburn's Pop Hits, 1940-1954, Record Research Inc., ISBN 0898201063
- Whitburn, Joel (2002), Joel Whitburn's Top Country Singles, 1944-2001, Record Research Inc., ISBN 0898201519
- Whitburn, Joel (2004), Joel Whitburn Presents Top R&B/Hip-Hop Singles, 1942-2004, Record Research Inc., ISBN 0898201608
- Whitburn, Joel (2007), Joel Whitburn Presents Billboard Top Adult Songs, 1961-2006, Record Research Inc., ISBN 0898201691
- Whitburn, Joel (2009), Joel Whitburn's Top Pop Singles, 1955-2008, Record Research Inc., ISBN 0898201802
