= The Rhythms and Ballads of Broadway =

1960 double album by Johnny Mathis

Studio album by Johnny Mathis
- Released: September 1960
- Recorded: 1960
- Genre: Vocal
- Length: 84:08
- Label: Columbia
- Producer: Mitch Miller

Johnny Mathis chronology
Johnny's Mood (1960)	The Rhythms and Ballads of Broadway (1960)	I'll Buy You a Star (1961)

Single LP covers
- Ballads of Broadway (1964)

Alternative cover
- Rhythms of Broadway (1964)

Professional ratings
Review scores
Source	Rating
Billboard	positive
The Encyclopedia of Popular Music	3/5 stars

The Rhythms and Ballads of Broadway is a double album by American pop singer Johnny Mathis that was released in September 1960 by Columbia Records. Despite the order of the words in the title, the ballads actually make up sides one and two while the uptempo numbers fill sides three and four.

The album debuted on Billboard magazine's album chart in the issue dated October 3, 1960, and stayed on the list for 27 weeks, during which time it peaked at number six. it also debuted on the Cashbox albums chart in the issue dated September 24, 1960, and remained on the chart for 37 weeks, peaking at number 18.

Columbia also released the album as two separate LPs in 1960 titled Ballads of Broadway and Rhythms of Broadway. The two-LP set was released for the first time on compact disc on June 7, 1999. The Rhythms and Ballads of Broadway was also included in Legacy's Mathis box set The Voice of Romance: The Columbia Original Album Collection, which was released on December 8, 2017.

== Reception ==
Billboard described it as a "power-packed item, from the chanter's pretty vocalizing, and smart Ralph Burns-Glenn Osser backings, to the attractive, eye-catching cover."

== Track listing ==
=== The Ballads of Broadway ===
Side one

1. "Moanin' Low" from The Little Show (Howard Dietz, Ralph Rainger) – 3:56
2. "Fun to Be Fooled" from Life Begins at 8:40 (Harold Arlen, Ira Gershwin, E. Y. Harburg) – 4:02
3. "I Have Dreamed" from The King And I (Oscar Hammerstein II, Richard Rodgers) – 4:04
4. "On the Sunny Side of the Street" from Lew Leslie's International Revue (Dorothy Fields, Jimmy McHugh) – 3:57
5. "My Romance" from Jumbo (Lorenz Hart, Rodgers) – 3:10
6. "Dancing on the Ceiling" from Ever Green (Hart, Rodgers) – 3:54

Side two

1. "I Married an Angel" from I Married an Angel (Hart, Rodgers) – 3:48
2. "Isn't It a Pity?" from Pardon My English (George Gershwin, I. Gershwin) – 3:55
3. "Spring Is Here" from I Married an Angel (Hart, Rodgers) – 3:48
4. "Don't Blame Me" from Clowns in Clover (Fields, McHugh) – 4:38
5. "Taking a Chance on Love" from Cabin in the Sky (Vernon Duke, Ted Fetter, John La Touche) – 3:33
6. "The Party's Over" from Bells Are Ringing (Betty Comden, Adolph Green, Jule Styne) – 4:01

=== The Rhythms of Broadway ===
Side three

1. "Everything's Coming Up Roses" from Gypsy: A Musical Fable (Stephen Sondheim, Styne) – 2:51
2. "Guys and Dolls" from Guys and Dolls (Frank Loesser) – 3:00
3. "I Wish I Were in Love Again" from Babes in Arms (Hart, Rodgers) – 3:36
4. "You Do Something to Me" from Fifty Million Frenchmen (Cole Porter) – 3:05
5. "Let's Misbehave" from You Never Know (Porter) – 2:46
6. "I Could Have Danced All Night" from My Fair Lady (Alan Jay Lerner, Frederick Loewe) – 3:01

Side four

1. "A Cock-Eyed Optimist" from South Pacific (Hammerstein, Rodgers) – 2:33
2. "I Just Found Out About Love" from Strip for Action (Harold Adamson, McHugh) – 3:12
3. "Let's Do It (Let's Fall in Love)" from Paris (Porter) – 3:50
4. "I Am in Love" from Can-Can (Porter) – 4:15
5. "Love Eyes" from Whoop-Up (Moose Charlap, Norman Gimbel) – 2:32
6. "Love Is a Gamble" from American Motors Industrial Show (Sydney Shaw, Jane Douglas White) – 2:35

== Recording dates ==
From the liner notes for The Voice of Romance: The Columbia Original Album Collection:

- April 4, 1960 — "I Have Dreamed", "Isn't It a Pity?"
- April 7, 1960 — "Dancing on the Ceiling", "I Married an Angel", "Moanin' Low", "My Romance", "On the Sunny Side of the Street", "The Party's Over", "Spring Is Here"
- April 8, 1960 — "Don't Blame Me", "Taking a Chance on Love"
- May 17, 1960 — "Guys and Dolls", "I Am in Love", "I Just Found Out About Love", "I Wish I Were in Love Again"
- May 19, 1960 — "Everything's Coming Up Roses", "Fun to Be Fooled", "Love Is a Gamble"
- May 20, 1960 — "A Cock-Eyed Optimist", "I Could Have Danced All Night", "Let's Misbehave", "You Do Something to Me"
- May 23, 1960 — "Let's Do It (Let's Fall in Love)", "Love Eyes"

== Personnel ==
- Johnny Mathis – vocals
- Mitch Miller – producer
- Glenn Osser – arranger and conductor (sides one and two, except as noted)
- Ralph Burns – arranger and conductor (sides three and four); conductor ("Fun to Be Fooled")
- Richard Avedon – photography
- Gilbert Millstein – liner notes

== Bibliography ==
- Whitburn, Joel (2010), Joel Whitburn Presents Top Pop Albums, Seventh Edition, Record Research Inc., ISBN 0-89820-183-7
- Hoffmann, Frank K (1988). The Cash box album charts, 1955-1974. Scarecrow Press. ISBN 0-8108-2005-6.
