= Better Together: The Duet Album =

Compilation album by Johnny Mathis
- Released: October 8, 1991
- Recorded: 1977–1991
- Genre: Vocal; R&B; stage & screen
- Length: 39:28
- Label: Columbia

Johnny Mathis chronology
In a Sentimental Mood: Mathis Sings Ellington (1990)	Better Together: The Duet Album (1991)	How Do You Keep the Music Playing? (1993)

Professional ratings
Review scores
Source	Rating
Allmusic	3/5 stars
The Encyclopedia of Popular Music	3/5 stars

Better Together: The Duet Album is a compilation album by American pop singer Johnny Mathis that was released on October 8, 1991, by Columbia Records and featured three new songs ("Better Together", "You Brought Me Love", and "Who's Counting Heartaches") alongside eight other pairings that were previously released.

The album spent its one week on Billboard magazine's album chart at number 189 in the issue dated January 11, 1992.

The song "Better Together" (on which he performs with Regina Belle) entered the magazine's Hot R&B Singles chart two months later, in the March 7 issue, and stayed there for five weeks, peaking at number 68.

== Reception ==
Bil Carpenter of Allmusic gave the collection a positive review, describing Mathis's 1984 collaboration with Deniece Williams, "Love Won't Let Me Wait", as a "stellar reunion" and his duet with Patti Austin, "You Brought Me Love", as an "unheralded masterpiece".

== Track listing ==
From the liner notes for the original album:

1. "Better Together" performed with Regina Belle (Randy Bowland) – 4:37
  - Nick Martinelli – producer, arranger
  - Randy Bowland – arranger
  - Jay Landers – executive producer
  - Gerald Albright – sax solo
  - Betty Wright – background vocals
2. "You Brought Me Love" performed with Patti Austin (Andy Goldmark) – 4:07
  - Thom Bell – producer, arranger
  - Jay Landers – executive producer
3. "Too Much, Too Little, Too Late" performed with Deniece Williams (Nat Kipner, John Vallins) – 2:59
  - Jack Gold – producer
4. "It's All in the Game" performed with Take 6 (Charles Dawes, Carl Sigman) – 2:33
  - Peter Bunetta – producer
  - Rick Chudacoff – producer
  - Jay Landers – executive producer
5. "Love Won't Let Me Wait" performed with Deniece Williams (Vinnie Barrett, Bobby Eli) – 4:16
  - Denny Diante – producer
6. "You're a Special Part of Me" performed with Angela Bofill (Angela Bofill, Loree Gold) – 4:13
  - Denny Diante – producer
7. "The Last Time I Felt Like This" performed with Jane Olivor (Alan and Marilyn Bergman, Marvin Hamlisch) – 2:57
  - Jack Gold – producer
8. "Friends in Love" performed with Dionne Warwick (Bill Champlin, David Foster, Jay Graydon) – 4:03
  - Jay Graydon – producer
9. "In the Still of the Night" performed with Take 6 (Fred Parris) – 2:38
  - Peter Bunetta – producer
  - Rick Chudacoff – producer
  - Jay Landers – executive producer
10. "You're All I Need to Get By" performed with Deniece Williams (Nickolas Ashford, Valerie Simpson) - 2:40
  - Jack Gold – producer
11. "Who's Counting Heartaches" performed with Dionne Warwick (Ina Wolf, Peter Wolf) – 4:20
  - Sergio Mendes – producer
  - Jay Landers – executive producer

== Personnel ==
From the liner notes for the original album:

- Johnny Mathis – vocals
- Wally Traugott – mastering
- Nancy Donald – art direction
- Tracy Veal – design
- Bret Lopez – photographer

== Bibliography ==
- Whitburn, Joel (2004), Joel Whitburn Presents Top R&B/Hip-Hop Singles, 1942-2004, Record Research Inc., ISBN 0898201608
- Whitburn, Joel (2010), Joel Whitburn Presents Top Pop Albums, Seventh Edition, Record Research Inc., ISBN 0-89820-183-7
