= The Hollywood Musicals =

1986 studio album by Johnny Mathis and Henry Mancini

Studio album by Johnny Mathis and Henry Mancini
- Released: October 17, 1986
- Recorded: April 6, 1986
- Studio: Conway Studios, Hollywood, California, Ocean Way Recording, Hollywood, California
- Genre: Vocal
- Length: 42:10
- Label: Columbia
- Producer: Denny Diante

Johnny Mathis chronology
Christmas Eve with Johnny Mathis (1986)	The Hollywood Musicals (1986)	Once in a While (1988)

Professional ratings
Review scores
Source	Rating
Allmusic	3/5 stars
The Encyclopedia of Popular Music	3/5 stars

The Hollywood Musicals is an album by American pop singer Johnny Mathis and American composer/conductor Henry Mancini that was released on October 17, 1986, by Columbia Records. This project heralded Mathis's return to the genre of traditional pop, which he would revisit occasionally over the next few decades.

The album peaked at number 46 during an eight-week run on the UK album chart that began on December 13 of that year and received Silver certification from the British Phonographic Industry for sales of 60,000 units in the UK. It also spent two weeks on Billboard magazine's Top Pop Albums chart in January 1987 and made it to number 197.

== History ==
In 1983 a renewed interest in pop songs dating back to the era before rock and roll became apparent when the album What's New by Linda Ronstadt received Platinum certification from the Recording Industry Association of America just three months after its release. The recording focused exclusively on standards from the Great American Songbook and was arranged and conducted by Nelson Riddle. The Broadway Album, a 1985 release of show tunes by Barbra Streisand, provided more evidence that there was an audience for what would be eventually referred to as traditional pop albums when it attained double Platinum certification only two months after its release and spent three weeks as the number one album in the US.

As The Broadway Album did for Streisand, The Hollywood Musicals brought Mathis back into familiar territory. He had spent the first 10 years of his recording career sticking with easy listening fare, but his 1966 LP The Shadow of Your Smile included covers of two songs by The Beatles ("Michelle" and "Yesterday") and became his first album to reach the top 10 since 1960's The Rhythms and Ballads of Broadway and the first to receive Gold certification since 1959's Faithfully. Contemporary music became a Mathis album mainstay from that point on, but many of his releases from the 1970s made room for one or two classics such as "Since I Fell for You", "Stardust", "All the Things You Are", and "That Old Black Magic". By the mid-80s, however, his studio albums were focused more on original material, so much so that his 1985 effort, Right from the Heart, left out not only anything reminiscent of those early pop hits but also any covers of recent radio favorites as well. Whereas that album failed to chart in either the US or the UK, his 1983 UK concert album Unforgettable – A Musical Tribute to Nat King Cole was his best-selling disc, in terms of British Phonographic Industry standards, since That's What Friends Are For, his 1978 pairing with Deniece Williams. Even though this success was on a much smaller scale than was available from the US buying public, the sales phenomena that was also enjoyed by both Ronstadt and Streisand in the US only underscored the interest in material that was in such sharp contrast to his recent output.

== Track listing ==
All tracks recorded on April 6, 1986.

1. "You Stepped Out of a Dream" from Ziegfeld Girl (1941) (Nacio Herb Brown, Gus Kahn) – 3:30
2. "Taking a Chance on Love" from Cabin in the Sky (1943) (Vernon Duke, Ted Fetter, John La Touche) – 3:00
3. "When You Wish Upon a Star" from Pinocchio (1940) (Leigh Harline, Ned Washington) – 3:40
4. "True Love" from High Society (1956) (Cole Porter) – 3:06
5. "Whistling Away the Dark" from Darling Lili (1970) (Henry Mancini, Johnny Mercer) – 3:19
6. "Time After Time" from It Happened in Brooklyn (1947) (Sammy Cahn, Jule Styne) – 3:27
7. "It Might as Well Be Spring" from State Fair (1945) (Oscar Hammerstein II, Richard Rodgers) – 4:34
8. "I Had the Craziest Dream" from Springtime in the Rockies (1942) (Mack Gordon, Harry Warren) – 3:05
9. "Long Ago (and Far Away)" from Cover Girl (1944) (Ira Gershwin, Jerome Kern) – 4:00
10. "Crazy World" from Victor Victoria (1982) (Leslie Bricusse, Henry Mancini) – 3:00
11. Johnny Burke/Jimmy Van Heusen Medley – 7:05
  a. "Moonlight Becomes You" from Road to Morocco (1942)
  b. "It Could Happen to You" from And the Angels Sing (1944)
  c. "But Beautiful" from Road to Rio (1947)

The 1993 box set The Music of Johnny Mathis: A Personal Collection includes his recording of a song from the 1944 Disney film The Three Caballeros, "Baía (Na Baixa do Sapateiro)", which had been recorded for this album but not included in the final track selection. Another Disney song from this session that didn't make the cut, "Brazil (Aquarela do Brasil)" from Saludos Amigos, had its debut release on the 1998 compilation The Ultimate Hits Collection.

=== 2017 CD bonus tracks ===
This album's CD release as part of the 2017 box set The Voice of Romance: The Columbia Original Album Collection included three bonus tracks, the first of which had not been available before:

- "I'll Take Romance" from I'll Take Romance (Oscar Hammerstein II, Ben Oakland) – 3:06
- "Baía (Na Baixa do Sapateiro)" from The Three Caballeros (Ary Barroso, Ray Gilbert) – 4:08
- "Brazil (Aquarela do Brasil)" from Saludos Amigos (Barroso, Bob Russell) – 4:15

== Personnel ==
From the liner notes for the original album:

- Johnny Mathis – vocals
- Henry Mancini – piano solos ("It Might As Well Be Spring", "Taking a Chance on Love"), arranger, conductor
- Henry Mancini Orchestra & Chorus – performers
- Denny Diante – producer
- Richard Loring – musical consultant
- Jo-Anne McGettrick – production coordinator
- Michel Banon – assistant to the producer
- Marion Klein – contractor
- Nancy Donald – art direction
- Tony Lane – art direction
- David Vance – photographer
- Mick Guzauski – recording engineer, mixing engineer
- Brian Gardner – mastering engineer
- Tony Chiappa (Ocean Way Studios) – assistant engineer
- Bob Loftus (Ocean Way Studios) – assistant engineer
- Steve MacMillan (Ocean Way Studios) – assistant engineer
- Michael Ross (Ocean Way Studios) – assistant engineer
- Daren Klein (Conway Studios) – additional recording engineer; assistant engineer
- Richard McKernan (Conway Studios) – assistant engineer
- Jessie Peck – Conway Studios assistant
- Mastered at Bernie Grundman Mastering, Hollywood, California
- Mixed at Conway Studios, Hollywood, California
- Liner notes adapted from The Hollywood Musical by Clive Hirschhorn

== Bibliography ==
- Whitburn, Joel (2010), Joel Whitburn Presents Top Pop Albums, Seventh Edition, Record Research Inc., ISBN 978-0-89820-183-3
