= Because You Loved Me: The Songs of Diane Warren =

Studio album by Johnny Mathis
- Released: October 20, 1998
- Recorded: 1998
- Studio: Westlake Recording Studios, West Hollywood, California, Record Plant, Los Angeles, California, Simply Audio, Los Angeles, California
- Genre: Vocal
- Length: 48:03
- Label: Columbia
- Producer: Humberto Gatica

Johnny Mathis chronology
The Ultimate Hits Collection (1998)	Because You Loved Me: The Songs of Diane Warren (1998)	Mathis on Broadway (2000)

Because You Loved Me: The Songs of Diane Warren is an album by American pop singer Johnny Mathis that was released on October 20, 1998, by Columbia Records on which he covers 10 of the songwriter's hits.

== Reception ==
Professional ratings
Review scores
Source	Rating
Allmusic	4/5 stars

William Ruhlmann of AllMusic gave the album a four-star rating, saying that "this is a distinguished step on Diane Warren's path to full recognition of her talents, and a typically high-quality effort from Mathis as well."

== Track listing ==
All songs written by Diane Warren, except as noted:

1. "Un-Break My Heart" – 5:01
  - Rick Hunt – arrangement; synth programming; keyboards
  - Rafael Padilla – percussion
  - Michael Landau – electric guitar
  - Dean Parks – acoustic guitar
  - Kenny O'Brien – background vocals
  - Francis Benitez – background vocals
  - Natisse "Bambi" Jones – background vocals
2. "Love Will Lead You Back" – 5:09
  - Tony Smith – arrangement; synth programming; keyboards
  - Rafael Padilla – percussion
  - Michael Landau – electric and acoustic guitars
  - Kenny O'Brien – background vocals
  - Francis Benitez – background vocals
  - Kenya Hathaway – background vocals
3. "Don't Take Away My Heaven" – 4:38
  - Lester Mendez – arrangement; synth programming; keyboards
  - Michael Landau – electric guitars
  - Kenny O'Brien – background vocals
  - Francis Benitez – background vocals
  - Natisse "Bambi" Jones – background vocals
4. "If You Asked Me To" – 4:13
  - Lester Mendez – arrangement; synth programming; keyboards
  - Rafael Padilla – percussion
  - Michael Landau – electric guitars
  - Kenny O'Brien – background vocals
  - Francis Benitez – background vocals
  - Natisse "Bambi" Jones – background vocals
5. "By the Time This Night Is Over" (Michael Bolton, Andy Goldmark, Warren) – 4:39
  - Tony Smith – arrangement; synth programming; keyboards
  - Rafael Padilla – percussion
  - Kenny O'Brien – background vocals
  - Francis Benitez – background vocals
  - Kenya Hathaway – background vocals
6. "Because You Loved Me" – 4:37
  - David Foster – arrangement; synth programming
  - Lester Mendez – additional keyboards
  - Michael Landau – electric guitars
  - Kenny O'Brien – background vocals
  - Francis Benitez – background vocals
  - Bernadette "Brandy" Jones – background vocals
7. "All I Want Is Forever" – 4:28
  - Lester Mendez – arrangement; synth programming; keyboards
  - Michael Landau – electric guitar
  - Kenny O'Brien – background vocals
  - Francis Benitez – background vocals
  - Natisse "Bambi" Jones – background vocals
8. "Set the Night to Music" – 5:10
  - Danny Luchansky – arrangement; synth programming; keyboards
  - Michael Landau – electric guitars
  - David Boruff – tenor sax
  - Kenny O'Brien – arrangement; background vocals
  - Francis Benitez – background vocals
  - Natisse "Bambi" Jones – background vocals
9. "Live for Loving You" (Emilio Estefan Jr., Gloria Estefan, Warren) – 5:39
  - Lester Mendez – arrangement; synth programming; keyboards
  - Rafael Padilla – percussion
  - Michael Landau – electric guitars
  - Kenny O'Brien – background vocals
  - Francis Benitez – background vocals
  - Natisse "Bambi" Jones – background vocals
10. "Missing You Now" (Walter Afanasieff, Michael Bolton, Warren) – 4:24
  - Danny Luchansky – arrangement; synth programming; keyboards
  - Michael Landau – electric guitars
  - Rafael Padilla – percussion
  - Kenny O'Brien – arrangement; background vocals
  - Francis Benitez – background vocals
  - Natisse "Bambi" Jones – background vocals

== Personnel ==
From the liner notes for the original album:

- Johnny Mathis – vocals
- Humberto Gatica – producer, recording engineer, mixer
- Alex Rodriguez – additional engineering
- Chris Brooke – assistant; additional engineering
- Cristian Robles – assistant; additional engineering
- Frederic Sarhagen – assistant
- Joanna Ifrah – A&R direction
- Vlado Meller – mastering
- Danny Luchansky – Pro Tools editor
- Kenny O'Brien – Pro Tools editor
- Christine Wilson – art direction/design
- David Vance – photography
- Mixed at Westlake Recording Studios, Los Angeles, California
- Mastered at Sony Music Studios, New York, New York
