= The Johnny Mathis Collection =

Compilation album by Johnny Mathis
- Released: 1 August 1976
- Recorded: 1959–1968
- Genres: AM pop; early pop/rock; vocal
- Length: 1:08:16
- Labels: Hallmark Records; Pickwick Records

Johnny Mathis chronology
I Only Have Eyes for You (1976)	The Johnny Mathis Collection (1976)	Mathis Is... (1977)

The Johnny Mathis Collection is a compilation album by American pop singer Johnny Mathis that was released in the UK in 1976 by Hallmark and Pickwick Records in arrangement with the CBS Records division of Columbia. This is a two-LP set, with the first two sides being what is actually a reissue of the singer's 1961 compilation Portrait of Johnny and the second two being 10 tracks from three other albums: 1959's Faithfully, 1967's Up, Up and Away and 1968's Those Were the Days.

On June 30, 1977, the British Phonographic Industry awarded the collection with Gold certification for sales of 100,000 units in the UK, and Platinum certification for 300,000 units was awarded on January 17, 1978, making this album the only vinyl Mathis release to sell that many copies in the region.

== Track listing ==
=== Side one ===
1. "Starbright" (Lee Pockriss, Paul Vance) – 2:48
2. "While You're Young" (Barbara Hayden, Tony Romano) – 2:54
3. "Should I Wait (Or Should I Run to Her)" (Leon Carr, Vance) – 2:48
4. "All Is Well" (Jerry Leiber, Mike Stoller) – 2:31
5. "You Set My Heart to Music" from the 1960 Broadway musical 13 Daughters (Eaton Magoon, Jr.) – 2:46
6. "My Love for You" (Abner Silver, Sid Wayne) – 3:07

=== Side two ===
1. "Oh That Feeling" (Jack Segal, Vance) – 2:36
2. "How to Handle a Woman" from Camelot (Alan Jay Lerner, Frederick Loewe) – 3:02
3. "Cherie" (Michael Coldin, T. Prescott) – 2:49
4. "Hey Love" (Pockriss, Vance) – 2:28
5. "Jenny" (Segal, Vance) – 2:58
6. "The Story of Our Love" (Michael Colicchio, Anthony Piano) – 2:24

=== Side three ===
1. "Up, Up and Away" (Jimmy Webb) – 2:55
2. "Tonight" from West Side Story (Leonard Bernstein, Stephen Sondheim) – 3:16
3. "Turn Around, Look at Me" (Jerry Capehart) – 2:51
4. "The 59th Street Bridge Song (Feelin' Groovy)" (Paul Simon) – 2:10
5. "This Guy's in Love with You" (Burt Bacharach, Hal David) – 4:38

=== Side four ===
1. "Those Were the Days" (Boris Fomin, Gene Raskin) – 3:59
2. "Maria" from West Side Story (Bernstein, Sondheim) – 3:45
3. "Light My Fire" (John Densmore, Robby Krieger, Ray Manzarek, Jim Morrison) – 3:49
4. "The More I See You" (Mack Gordon, Harry Warren) – 4:03
5. "Little Green Apples" (Bobby Russell) – 3:39

== Personnel ==
- Johnny Mathis – vocals

== Charts ==
=== Weekly charts ===
Chart (1977)	Peak position
Australian Albums (Kent Music Report)	21
UK Albums (Official Charts)	1

=== Year-end charts ===
Chart (1977)	Position
UK Albums (OCC)	10

== Certifications and sales ==
Region	Certification	Certified units/sales
United Kingdom (BPI)	Platinum	300,000^{^}
^{^} Shipments figures based on certification alone.
