= I'll Buy You a Star =

Studio album by Johnny Mathis
- Released: February 27, 1961
- Recorded: February 7, 1961; February 10, 1961; February 13, 1961
- Genre: Vocal
- Length: 41:51
- Label: Columbia
- Producer: Irving Townsend

Johnny Mathis chronology
The Rhythms and Ballads of Broadway (1960)	I'll Buy You a Star (1961)	Portrait of Johnny (1961)

I'll Buy You a Star is an album by American pop singer Johnny Mathis that was released on February 27, 1961, by Columbia Records and was the first of two album collaborations with arranger and conductor Nelson Riddle. The LP includes both ballads and swinging uptempo material throughout a mix of songs that range from the new to the familiar and obscure.

The album debuted on Billboard magazine's albums chart in the May 5, 1961, issue and reached number 38 during its 23 weeks there. It debuted on the Cash Box albums chart in the issue dated April 8, 1961, and remained on the chart for 36 weeks, peaking at number 11.

The first compact disc release of the album came on May 7, 1996, and included four bonus tracks that were recorded during the sessions for this album and originally released as singles or included on Mathis compilations. The same four tracks were included with this LP on disc one of the two-CD set released on June 9, 2009, while the other disc featured his 1962 project Live It Up!. I'll Buy You a Star was also included in Legacy's Mathis box set The Voice of Romance: The Columbia Original Album Collection, which was released on December 8, 2017.

== Reception ==
Professional ratings
Review scores
Source	Rating
AllMusic	4/5 stars
Billboard	positive
The Encyclopedia of Popular Music	3/5 stars
Disc	3/5 stars

AllMusic's Joe Viglione was especially impressed. "The voice of Johnny Mathis is always distinctive and compelling, but when blended with Nelson Riddle,… the results are extraordinary." Viglione pointed out that what set this recording apart "is that there is a smooth continuity of styles, a departure from the usual Mathis formula which would have the singer switching musical genres on many of his albums with only his voice to keep things consistent." As an example he wrote, "Where another '60s LP, So Nice, would blend current Top 40 and show tunes, a combination carried over to Mathis's projects in the '70s, Riddle works on the same level, equally talented and matching Johnny, their skills weaving a texture that creates a superior work of art -- and one without the necessity of a Top 40 hit." He does single out a couple of tracks in particular. "'The Best Is Yet to Come' is sassy and smart, the horns fitting nicely under the singer's perfect vocal instrument. 'Smile' is elegance suspended in space -- the instrumentation and voice swimming together, wrapped in a warm production." He concludes, "It's a fabulous set of recordings for those who appreciate music as art."

In their capsule review at the time of release, Billboard wrote, "Nelson Riddle provides fine backing" and that Mathis "is most effective on the ballads." Cash Box claims "The upbeat is embraced best on the title tune, 'When My Sugar Walks Down the Street' and 'Ring the Bell.' Variety wrote that Mathis "mixes swing and sweet in a way that appeals to young and adult disk fan giving him a buying spread that's held by only a few of the current diskers. Nigel Hunter of Disc believed "This set is of more than normal interest because the accompanients are in the capable hands of Nelson Riddle."

== Track listing ==
=== Side one ===
1. "I'll Buy You a Star" from A Tree Grows in Brooklyn (Dorothy Fields, Arthur Schwartz) – 3:20
2. "Stairway to the Stars" (Matty Malneck, Mitchell Parish, Frank Signorelli) – 4:51
3. "When My Sugar Walks Down the Street" (Gene Austin, Jimmy McHugh, Irving Mills) – 3:30
4. "Magic Garden" (Alan Bergman, Marilyn Keith, Lew Spence) – 3:58
5. "Smile" (Charlie Chaplin, Geoffrey Parsons, John Turner) – 3:15
6. "Oh, How I Try" (Roy Alfred, Marvin Fisher) – 3:40

=== Side two ===
1. "Ring the Bell" (Johnny Burke, Jimmy Van Heusen) – 1:57
2. "Love Look Away" from Flower Drum Song (Oscar Hammerstein II, Richard Rodgers) – 3:28
3. "Sudden Love" (Arthur Hamilton) – 3:28
4. "The Best Is Yet to Come" (Cy Coleman, Carolyn Leigh) – 3:42
5. "Warm and Willing" from A Private's Affair (Jay Livingston, Ray Evans, McHugh) – 3:13
6. "My Heart and I" (Allyn Ferguson, Donald Sargent) – 3:29

=== 1996 and 2009 CD bonus tracks ===
1. "Jenny" (Jack Segal, Paul Vance) – 2:58
  - released 3/20/61; B-side of "You Set My Heart to Music"; "Bubbling Under the Hot 100" chart: 118
2. "Wasn't the Summer Short?" (Ruth Lyons) – 2:53
  - rel. 9/8/61; Billboard Hot 100: #89
3. "Wherever You Are It's Spring" (Arthur Hamilton) – 2:33
  - rel. 1964 on I'll Search My Heart and Other Great Hits
4. "Should I Wait (Or Should I Run to Her)" (Leon Carr, Paul Vance) – 2:48
  - rel. 4/24/61; non-charting single

== Charts ==
Chart (1961)	Peak position
US Top LPs (Billboard)	38
US Cash Box	11

== Recording dates ==
=== Original album ===
- February 7, 1961 – "Love Look Away", "My Heart and I", "Smile", "Stairway to the Stars"
- February 10, 1961 – "Magic Garden", "Oh, How I Try", "Sudden Love", "Warm and Willing"
- February 13, 1961 – "The Best Is Yet to Come", "I'll Buy You a Star", "Ring the Bell", "When My Sugar Walks Down the Street"

=== 1996 and 2009 CD bonus tracks ===
- February 8, 1961 – "Jenny", "Should I Wait (Or Should I Run to Her)", "Wasn't the Summer Short?", "Wherever You Are It's Spring"

== Personnel ==
- Johnny Mathis – vocals
- Irving Townsend – producer
- Nelson Riddle – arranger and conductor
- Leigh Wiener – cover photo

== Bibliography ==
- Whitburn, Joel (2009), Joel Whitburn's Top Pop Singles, 1955-2008, Record Research Inc., ISBN 0898201802
- Whitburn, Joel (2010), Joel Whitburn Presents Top Pop Albums, Seventh Edition, Record Research Inc., ISBN 0-89820-183-7
- Hoffmann, Frank W (1988), The Cash box album charts, 1955-1974, Scarecrow Press, ISBN 0-810-82005-6
