= Live It Up! (Johnny Mathis album) =

Studio album by Johnny Mathis
- Released: December 11, 1961
- Recorded: April 24–25, 1961
- Genre: Vocal
- Length: 37:29
- Label: Columbia
- Producer: Irving Townsend

Johnny Mathis chronology
Portrait of Johnny (1961)	Live It Up! (1961)	Rapture (1962)

Live It Up! is an album by American pop singer Johnny Mathis that was released on December 11, 1961, by Columbia Records and was the second of two album collaborations with arranger and conductor Nelson Riddle. The singer again eschewed ballads as he had on Swing Softly and selected a balance of new and established material.

The album debuted on Billboard magazine's album chart in the issue dated February 24, 1962, to begin a stay of 39 weeks, during which time it got as high as number 14. it also debuted on the Cashbox albums chart in the issue dated February 17, 1962, and remained on the chart for the totals of 40 weeks, peaking at number eight.

This album was released on compact disc in a two-disc set with his other Riddle project, 1961's I'll Buy You a Star, on June 9, 2009. Live It Up! was also included in Legacy's Mathis box set The Voice of Romance: The Columbia Original Album Collection, which was released on December 8, 2017.

== Reception ==
Professional ratings
Review scores
Source	Rating
Billboard	positive
New Record Mirror	5/5
The Encyclopedia of Popular Music	3/5 stars

Billboard was enthusiastic. "This is easily one of Mathis's best albums", they wrote. "He's really in a swingin' mood, and he gets standout arrangements to match from Nelson Riddle."

Cashbox claims Mathis "soft, feelingful tones are expertly backed by the Nelson Riddle ork which provides a suitable accompaniment to his vocalizing in addition to being a sales plus."

Variety wrote that "Johnny Mathis is in a peppy mood dishing out energetic vocal sounds that really bounce across the grooves."

Ralph Vaughan Williams of American Record Guide thought "Prehaps his voice has deepend, or else he has abandoned some of his vocal affectations, or maybe Nelson Riddle, who did the arrangements and also conducts, has had some effect."

Jimmy Watson of New Record Mirror wrote "Johnny swings at mighty pace and lifts the songs right into new dressings, giving it five-star rating." the album received three-star rating from The Encyclopedia of Popular Music.

== Track listing ==
=== Side one ===
1. "Live It Up" (Alan Bergman, Marilyn Bergman) – 3:28
2. "Just Friends" (John Klenner, Sam M. Lewis) – 4:01
3. "Ace in the Hole" from Let's Face It! (Cole Porter) – 2:46
4. "On a Cold and Rainy Day" (Lee Pockriss, Paul Vance) – 3:06
5. "Why Not" (Otis G. Clements, Sydney Shaw) – 2:08
6. "I Won't Dance" from Roberta (Dorothy Fields, Oscar Hammerstein II, Otto Harbach, Jerome Kern, Jimmy McHugh) – 3:58

=== Side two ===
1. "Johnny One Note" from Babes in Arms (Lorenz Hart, Richard Rodgers) – 2:39
2. "Too Much Too Soon" (Marvin Fisher, Jack Segal) – 2:51
3. "The Riviera" (Cy Coleman, Joseph Allen McCarthy) – 3:03
4. "Crazy in the Heart" (William Engvick, Alec Wilder) – 3:55
5. "Hey, Look Me Over" from Wildcat (Coleman, Carolyn Leigh) – 1:48
6. "Love" from Ziegfeld Follies (Ralph Blane, Hugh Martin) – 3:46

== Charts ==
Chart (1962)	Peak position
US Top LPs (Billboard)	14
US Cash Box	8

== Recording dates ==
From the liner notes for The Voice of Romance: The Columbia Original Album Collection:

- April 24, 1961 — "Ace in the Hole", "Johnny One Note", "Just Friends", "Live It Up", "The Riviera"
- April 25, 1961 — "Crazy in the Heart", "Hey, Look Me Over", "I Won't Dance", "Love", "On a Cold and Rainy Day", "Too Much Too Soon", "Why Not"

== Personnel ==
- Johnny Mathis – vocals
- Irving Townsend – producer
- Nelson Riddle – arranger and conductor
- Bob Cato – cover photo
- Curtis F. Brown – liner notes

== Bibliography ==
- Whitburn, Joel (2010), Joel Whitburn Presents Top Pop Albums, Seventh Edition, Record Research Inc., ISBN 0-89820-183-7
- Larkin, Colin (2007), The Encyclopedia of Popular Music, Omnibus Press, ISBN 9-7818-4609-8567
- Hoffmann, Frank W (1988), The Cash box album charts, 1955-1974, Scarecrow Press, ISBN 0-810-82005-6
