= There You Are (Johnny Mathis song) =

- US 7-inch single

Single by Johnny Mathis

from the album Johnny's Newest Hits
- A-side: "Wasn't the Summer Short?"
- Released: September 8, 1961
- Recorded: September 26, 1958
- Genre: Pop
- Length: 2:49
- Label: Columbia
- Songwriters: Clyde Otis; Chris Towns
- Producers: Al Ham; Mitch Miller

Johnny Mathis singles chronology
"Laurie, My Love" (1961)	"Wasn't the Summer Short?" / "There You Are" (1961)	"Sweet Thursday" / "One Look" (1961)

Music video
- "There You Are" on YouTube

"There You Are" is a popular song written by Clyde Otis and Chris Towns that was recorded by Johnny Mathis in 1958. It charted in 1961.

== Recording and release ==
Johnny Mathis recorded "There You Are" on September 26, 1958, with an orchestra conducted by Ray Ellis. It was produced by Al Ham and Mitch Miller and released as a single three years later, on September 8, 1961.

== Chart performance ==
"There You Are" began its two weeks on the Top 100 Pop Sales and Performance chart in Music Vendor magazine in the issue dated September 25, 1961, and peaked at number 94.

== Critical reception ==
In their review column, the editors of Cash Box magazine gave "There You Are" a letter grade of B+. They wrote, "Another solid cozy romantic delivery from the star." The editors of Billboard magazine wrote, "A poignant ballad is sung with feeling and tenderness by Mathis."

== Charts ==
Weekly chart performance for "There You Are"
Chart (1961)	Peak position
US Top 100 Pop Sales and Performance (Music Vendor)	94

== Bibliography ==
- Whitburn, Joel (2012), Joel Whitburn's Hit Records 1954-1982, Record Research Inc., ISBN 978-0-89820-200-7
