= There You Are =

There You Are may refer to:

- "There You Are" (Goo Goo Dolls song), 1990
- "There You Are" (Johnny Mathis song), 1961
- "There You Are" (Martina McBride song), 2000
- "There You Are" (Willie Nelson song), 1989
- "There You Are", a song by Iyaz from his 2010 album Replay
- ”There You Are”, a song by Zayn from his 2018 album Icarus Falls

== See also ==
- There You Are!
