= Johnny's Newest Hits =

Greatest hits album by Johnny Mathis
- Released: February 25, 1963
- Recorded: 1958–1962
- Genre: Vocal; pop/rock
- Length: 34:09
- Label: Columbia
- Producer: Irving Townsend; Ernie Altschuler; Mitch Miller; Al Ham; Frank DeVol

Johnny Mathis chronology
Rapture (1962)	Johnny's Newest Hits (1963)	Johnny (1963)

Professional ratings
Review scores
Source	Rating
Billboard	positive
New Record Mirror	4/5 stars
The Encyclopedia of Popular Music	4/5 stars

Johnny's Newest Hits is a compilation album by American pop singer Johnny Mathis that was released by Columbia Records on February 25, 1963, and includes the A- and B-sides of six of his singles.

The album made its first appearance on Billboard magazine's Top LPs chart in the issue dated April 20 of that year and got as high as number six during its 45 weeks there.

== Reception ==
Billboard described the album as a collection of his "latest hits, the ones that brought him back to the singles charts", the most notable of these being the top 10 hits "Gina" and "What Will Mary Say", and their summary of the compilation reads, "Good wax for the Mathis fans."

== Track listing ==
Recording and release dates are taken from the liner notes of The Singles (2015).

=== Side one ===
1. "What Will Mary Say" (Eddie Snyder, Paul Vance) – 3:09
  - rec. 8/9/62, rel. 1/4/63; Billboard Hot 100: #9, Easy Listening: #3
2. "Unaccustomed As I Am" (Ray Ellis, Al Stillman) – 2:55
  - rec. 3/4/61, rel. 4/27/62; B-side of "Marianna"
3. "Sweet Thursday" (Jerry Livingston, Paul Francis Webster) – 2:30
  - rec. 10/9/61, rel. 12/29/61; Billboard Hot 100: #99
4. "There You Are" (Clyde Otis, Chris Towns) – 2:48
  - rec. 9/26/58, rel. 9/8/61; B-side of "Wasn't the Summer Short?"
5. "Wasn't the Summer Short?" (Ruth Lyons) – 2:53
  - rec. 2/8/61, rel. 9/8/61; Billboard Hot 100: #89
6. "That's the Way It Is" (Leon Carr, Paul Vance) – 2:49
  - rec. 3/29/62, rel. 7/27/62; half of uncharted single

=== Side two ===
1. "Gina" (Leon Carr, Paul Vance) – 2:46
  - rec. 8/9/62, rel. 9/7/62; Billboard Hot 100: #6, Easy Listening: #2
2. "Marianna" (Alfred Newman, Paul Francis Webster) – 2:50
  - rec. 3/29/62, rel. 4/27/62; Billboard Hot 100: #86
3. "I Love Her That's Why" (Jack Segal, Paul Vance) – 2:27
  - rec. 10/9/61, rel. 9/7/62; B-side of "Gina"
4. "I'll Never Be Lonely Again" (Sherman Edwards, Aaron Schroeder) – 3:08
  - rec. 5/23/60, rel. 7/27/62; half of uncharted single
5. "One Look" (Arthur Hamilton) – 2:52
  - rec. 10/9/61, rel. 12/29/61; B-side of "Sweet Thursday"
6. "Quiet Girl" (Marvin Fisher, Jack Segal) – 2:56
  - rec. 10/9/61, rel. 1/4/63; B-side of "What Will Mary Say"

== Personnel ==
- Johnny Mathis – vocals
- Irving Townsend – producer (except as noted)
- Ernie Altschuler – producer ("Gina", "What Will Mary Say")
- Mitch Miller – producer ("I'll Never Be Lonely Again", "There You Are")
- Al Ham – producer ("There You Are")
- Frank DeVol – producer ("Unaccustomed As I Am")
- Tom Palumbo – photo credit

== Bibliography ==
- Whitburn, Joel (2007), Joel Whitburn Presents Billboard Top Adult Songs, 1961-2006, Record Research Inc., ISBN 0-89820-169-1
- Whitburn, Joel (2009), Joel Whitburn's Top Pop Singles, 1955-2008, Record Research Inc., ISBN 0898201802
- Whitburn, Joel (2010), Joel Whitburn Presents Top Pop Albums, Seventh Edition, Record Research Inc., ISBN 0-89820-183-7
