= That's the Way It Is (Johnny Mathis song) =

- US 7-inch single

Single by Johnny Mathis

from the album Johnny's Newest Hits
- B-side: "I'll Never Be Lonely Again"
- Released: July 27, 1962
- Recorded: March 29, 1962
- Genre: Pop
- Length: 2:50
- Label: Columbia
- Songwriters: Leon Carr; Paul Vance
- Producer: Irving Townsend

Johnny Mathis singles chronology
"Tonight" (1962)	"That's the Way It Is" / "I'll Never Be Lonely Again" (1962)	"Gina" (1962)

Music video
- "That's the Way It Is" on YouTube

"That's the Way It Is" is a popular song written by Leon Carr and Paul Vance that was recorded by Johnny Mathis in 1962. It charted that same year.

== Recording and release ==
Johnny Mathis recorded "That's the Way It Is" on March 29, 1962, with an orchestra conducted by Pete King. It was produced by Irving Townsend and released as a single four months later, on July 27.

== Chart performance ==
"That's the Way It Is" reached number 35 on Cash Box magazine's Looking Ahead chart, which was described as a "compilation, in order of strength, of up and coming records showing signs of breaking into The Cash Box Top 100". It reached number 115 on Music Vendor magazine's Going Up – Heading for the Top 100 chart.

== Critical reception ==
In their review column, the editors of Cash Box magazine featured the single as their Pick of the Week, which was their equivalent to a letter grade of A for both "That's the Way It Is" and its B-side, "I'll Never Be Lonely Again". Combining their comments for both songs, they wrote, "Watch for both ends of the velvety-voiced performer to be filling the air-waves in no time flat. They’re two haunting ballads that Johnny wraps up in ultra-lovely fashion." They concluded, "Excellent two-sider." The editors of Billboard gave the song three stars.

== Charts ==
Weekly chart performance for "That's the Way It Is"
Chart (1962)	Peak position
US Going Up – Heading for the Top 100 (Music Vendor)	115
US Looking Ahead (Cash Box)	35

== Bibliography ==
- Whitburn, Joel (2012), Joel Whitburn's Hit Records 101-150 1959-1982, Record Research Inc., ISBN 978-0-89820-201-4
