= Allegro (musical) =

Musical by Rodgers and Hammerstein

- Original Broadway poster (1947)
- Music: Richard Rodgers
- Lyrics: Oscar Hammerstein II
- Book: Oscar Hammerstein II
- Productions: 1947 Broadway; 1948 US Tour
- Awards: Donaldson Award for Best Book of a Musical; Donaldson Award for Best Score; Donaldson Award for Best Lyrics

Allegro is a musical by Richard Rodgers (music) and Oscar Hammerstein II (book and lyrics), their third collaboration for the stage. Opening on Broadway on October 10, 1947, the musical centers on the life of Joseph Taylor Jr., who follows in the footsteps of his father as a doctor, but is tempted by fortune and fame at a big-city hospital.

After the immense successes of the first two Rodgers and Hammerstein musicals, Oklahoma! and Carousel, the pair sought a subject for their next play. Hammerstein had long contemplated a serious work that would deal with the problems of the ordinary man in the fast-moving modern world. He and Rodgers sought to create a work which would be as innovative as their first two stage musicals. To that end, they created a play with a large cast, including a Greek chorus. The production would have no sets; props and projections served to suggest locations.

After a disastrous tryout in New Haven, Connecticut, the musical opened on Broadway to a large advance sale of tickets, and very mixed reviews. Agnes de Mille, the choreographer of Rodgers and Hammerstein's previous Broadway productions, both directed and choreographed the work. The show was viewed as too moralistic, and the Broadway run ended after nine months; it was followed by a short national tour. There was no West End production and it has rarely been revived. There are two recordings of Allegro, the original cast album and a studio recording released in 2009.

== Conception ==
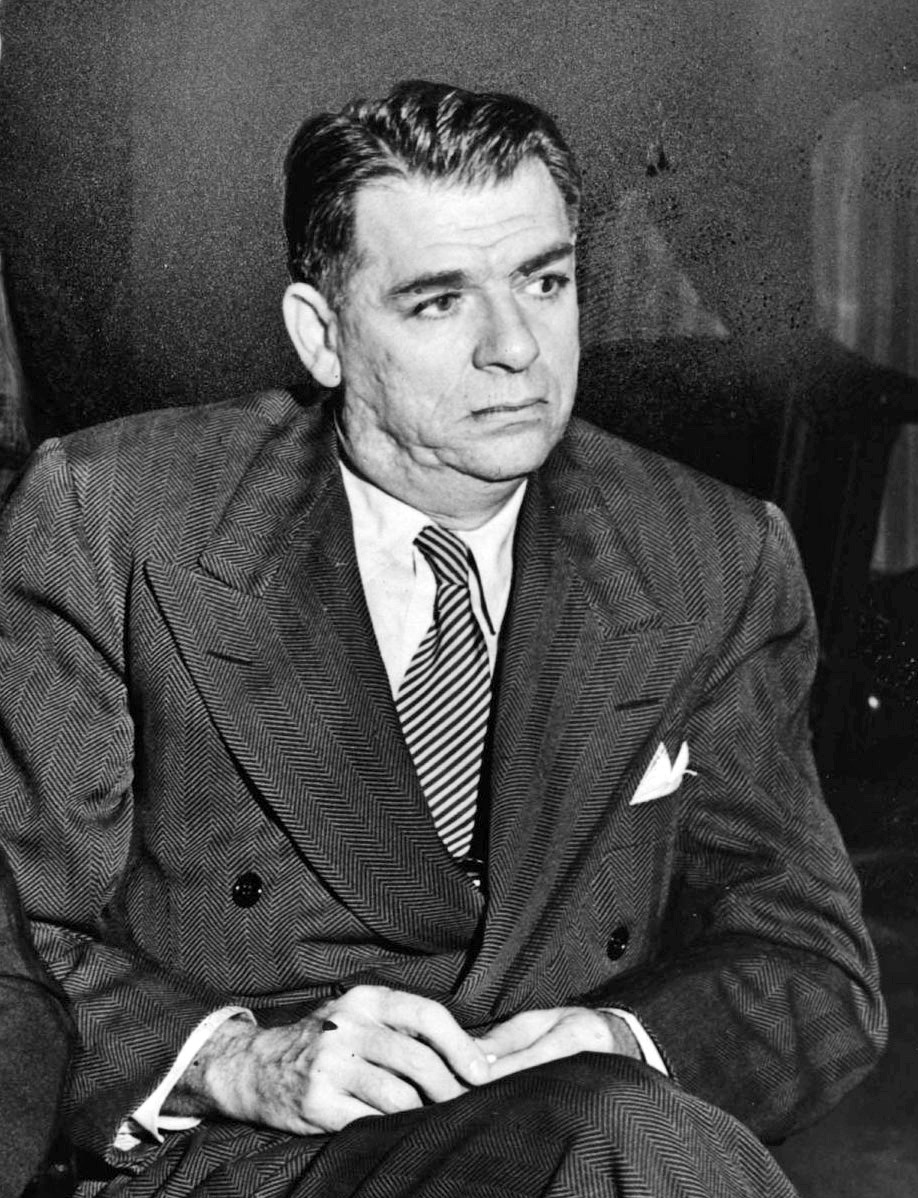
Oscar Hammerstein II

Oscar Hammerstein II had always wanted to write a serious drama, one which would address the problems of life confronting ordinary people. By early 1946, three years after his partnership with Richard Rodgers commenced, the duo had two hits (Oklahoma! and Carousel) on Broadway, and success as producers of musicals others had written. In March, Hammerstein approached Rodgers with the idea for a play with two men as the central characters, rather than the usual "boy and girl" format. Over the following weeks, the two discussed it, and the concept evolved into a musical about one man, a doctor's son, which appealed to Rodgers, the son and brother of doctors. By September, the general theme for the story had been established: the struggle of the main character to avoid compromising his principles as he progresses in life.

Hammerstein had thought of writing a play about a man, from birth to death. However, having just killed his leading male character, Billy Bigelow, onstage in Carousel, he was reluctant to kill off another. In the end, he took his protagonist from birth to age 35. He envisioned a simply staged work like Our Town which after its initial run would lend itself to college productions. Allegro was conceived as taking place in an open space, using props and projections to convey scenery to the audience. In addition to the usual singing chorus, there would be a speaking chorus, in the manner of a Greek chorus, which would comment on the action, and speak to both characters and audience.

As background research about the medical profession, Hammerstein interviewed his own doctor. He wrote a few pages of the book before embarking with his wife for Australia to visit his mother-in-law; when his ship arrived in Brisbane he mailed Rodgers part of the remainder. On receiving the packet, Rodgers, who generally did not compose until Hammerstein supplied him with a lyric, immediately sat down and composed three songs. Hammerstein put a good deal of his own experiences into the play. According to his son, William, "Most of the first act was based on his own memories of his own childhood. He had always been intrigued by it, you know; his mother died when he was twelve. I always felt his songs came out of his feelings about her."

Hammerstein spent a year writing and polishing the first act, taking infinite pains over the wording. The second act was more rushed; under a deadline, Hammerstein completed it only a week before rehearsals began. Hammerstein's protégé Stephen Sondheim, who served as a $25-a-week gofer on the production, stated,

Years later, in talking over the show with Oscar—I don't think I recognized it at the time—I realized he was trying to tell the story of his life ... Oscar meant it as a metaphor for what had happened to him. He had become so successful with Oklahoma! and Carousel that he was suddenly in demand all over the place. What he was talking about was the trappings, not so much of success, but of losing sight of what your goal is.

== Rehearsals and tryouts ==
The duo hired choreographer Agnes de Mille to direct—a move between two theatre functions which was unusual at the time. De Mille had been the choreographer for the dances in Oklahoma! and Carousel, designing ballets which disclosed the characters' psychological states to the audience. She had been concerned about the cohesion of the script as she received it from Hammerstein. When, a few days before rehearsals began, she asked Hammerstein what the show was about, the lyricist replied, "It's about a man not being allowed to do his own work because of worldly pressures." De Mille answered, "That's not the play you've written. You haven't written your second act." Hammerstein replied, "But we're already committed to the theatre in New York."

De Mille faced an immense task. Instead of conventional sets, locations were suggested by platforms, images projected onto backdrops, and lighting—there were 500 lighting cues, at the time a Broadway record. There were forty stagehands, needed to shift sixty partial sets, with objects moved onto the stage by a semicircular track hidden by an elaborate series of curtains. According to de Mille biographer Carol Easton, "Allegro was a leviathan of a show, on a scale exceeding the grasp of any individual."

Rehearsals took place in three New York locations, for principals, singers, and dancers. The production contained a cast of 67, including a corps of 37 singers and 23 dancers. De Mille also choreographed the dances, which were both extremely complicated and provided the framework for the scenes which made up the show. During the dances, Joe learns to walk, falls in love, goes astray, and then gets back on the proper track. De Mille used adults in children's clothes for the dances when Joe is a child; since there were no actual children on stage to provide scale, the illusion worked. The dance which accompanied "One Foot, Other Foot" was based on de Mille's own experiences in watching her own son Jonathan learn to walk.

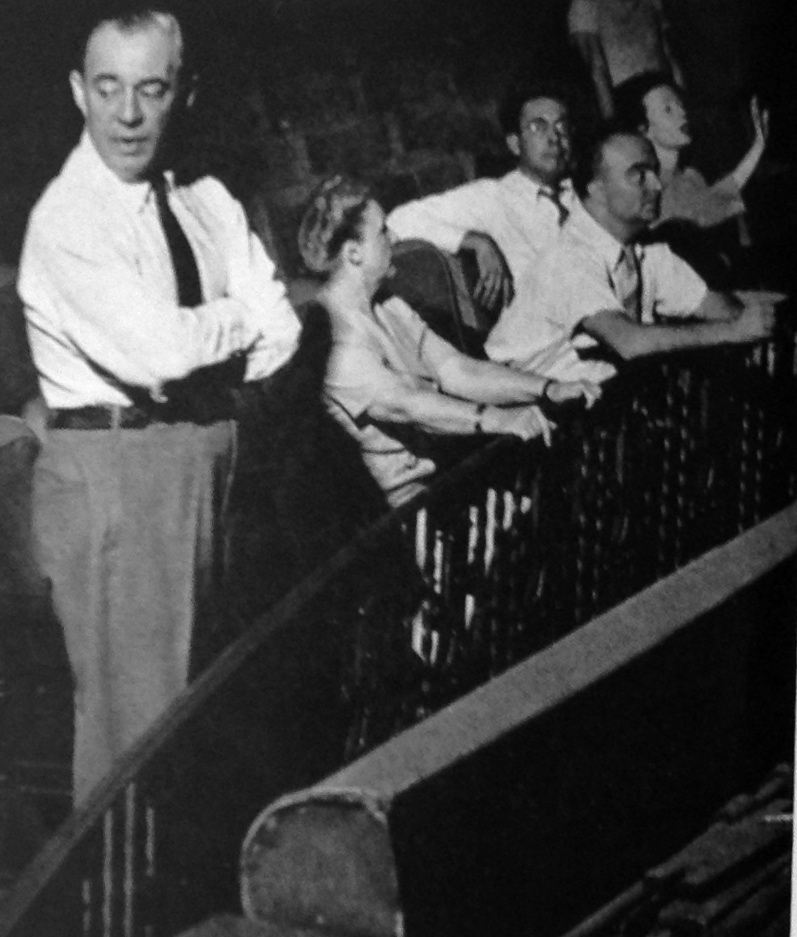
Rodgers (nearest to camera) and others at a rehearsal for Allegro

Sondheim later expressed his view of de Mille's directing, calling her "a horror. She treated the actors and singers like dirt and treated the dancers like gods ...[she was,] I think, an extremely insensitive woman, an excellent writer, and a terrible director, in terms of morale, anyway. That was my first experience of bad behavior in the theatre." However, Rufus Smith, who played the minor role of the football coach, stated, "Never again in my life will I experience what it is like to stop a show cold, by doing exactly what she taught me". The immense job of directing the play finally proved too big for de Mille, who stated "I can't do the new dances and the new songs and the new book," and Hammerstein stepped in to direct the dialogue. According to Rodgers biographer Meryle Secrest, at this point the cast was up in arms over de Mille's treatment of them. James Mitchell, one of the dancers in the production, later stated that de Mille was better at directing dancers than actors, as actors come to the stage with preconceived notions about how to play a part, and dancers do not.

The first tryout, in New Haven, Connecticut, did not go to plan. During the first act, William Ching, playing Joseph Taylor Sr., was singing "A Fellow Needs a Girl" when the scenery wall began to collapse, forcing him to hold it up until the stagehands noticed. Dancer Ray Harrison caught his tap in a track in the stage, tore the ligaments in his knee and was carried from the stage, screaming. Lisa Kirk, the first Emily, fell into the orchestra while singing "The Gentleman Is a Dope". She was catapulted back onto the stage with no pause in her singing, to great applause by the audience. Sondheim remembered,

Next day in the New York Herald Tribune ... Billy Rose, of all people was saying, "A star is born." Next night she comes back, came to the same point in the song, and starts to fall, and the entire audience gasps because they'd all read the Herald Tribune. She recovers quickly, they all sigh, and she gets another ovation. Oscar came backstage at the end and said, "You do that a third time and you're fired."

The disasters of the New Haven opener concluded during "Come Home", a song near the end of the play—the quiet urgings of the chorus and Joe's mother to entice him to return to his small town. A false fire alarm went off, and the audience began to push towards the exit. Joshua Logan, who was in attendance, loudly ordered the crowd to sit down, which it did. One of the Boston tryouts that followed New Haven was marked by boisterous behavior by conventioneers, until Hammerstein yelled, "Shut up!" and the audience subsided.

== Synopsis ==
=== Act 1 ===
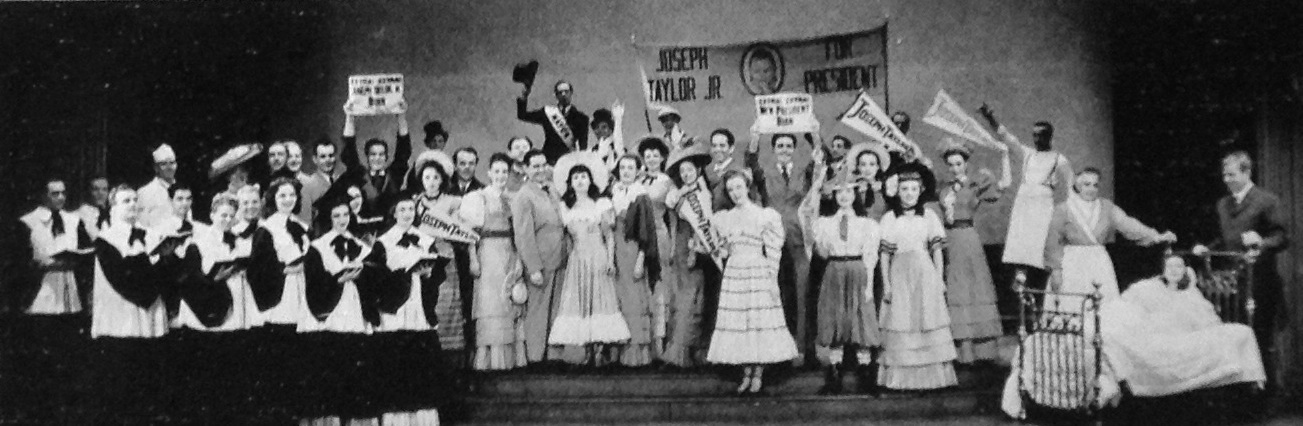
"Joseph Taylor, Jr.": the townsfolk assemble to celebrate Joe's birth. From the original Broadway production; William Ching as Dr. Taylor, with Muriel O'Malley as Grandma and Annamary Dickey as Marjorie (in bed), all at right.

The play opens with Marjorie Taylor in bed, in 1905. Wife of small-town doctor Joseph Taylor, she has just had a son. The people of the town predict great things for Joseph Taylor Jr., or Joe as he will come to be called (Musical number: "Joseph Taylor, Jr."). Joe learns what a baby learns: the comforting presence of his mother, the presence of another figure, who does not smell as nice, and who always leaves as soon as he picks up his black bag. Joe is seen as a baby and then not again as a child; the audience takes his perspective. Joe's grandma notices him trying to walk, calls for Marjorie to witness the first steps, and once he takes them, as the chorus states, "the world belongs to Joe" ("One Foot, Other Foot"). Joe grows to school age, and loses his beloved Grandma. He is comforted by Jennie Brinker, a businessman's daughter. The two grow to high school age and date, though Joe lacks the nerve to kiss her, to Jennie's frustration. As Joe prepares to leave for college, Dr. Taylor hopes that his son will help him in his medical practice, and he and Marjorie wonder if Joe will marry Jennie ("A Fellow Needs a Girl").

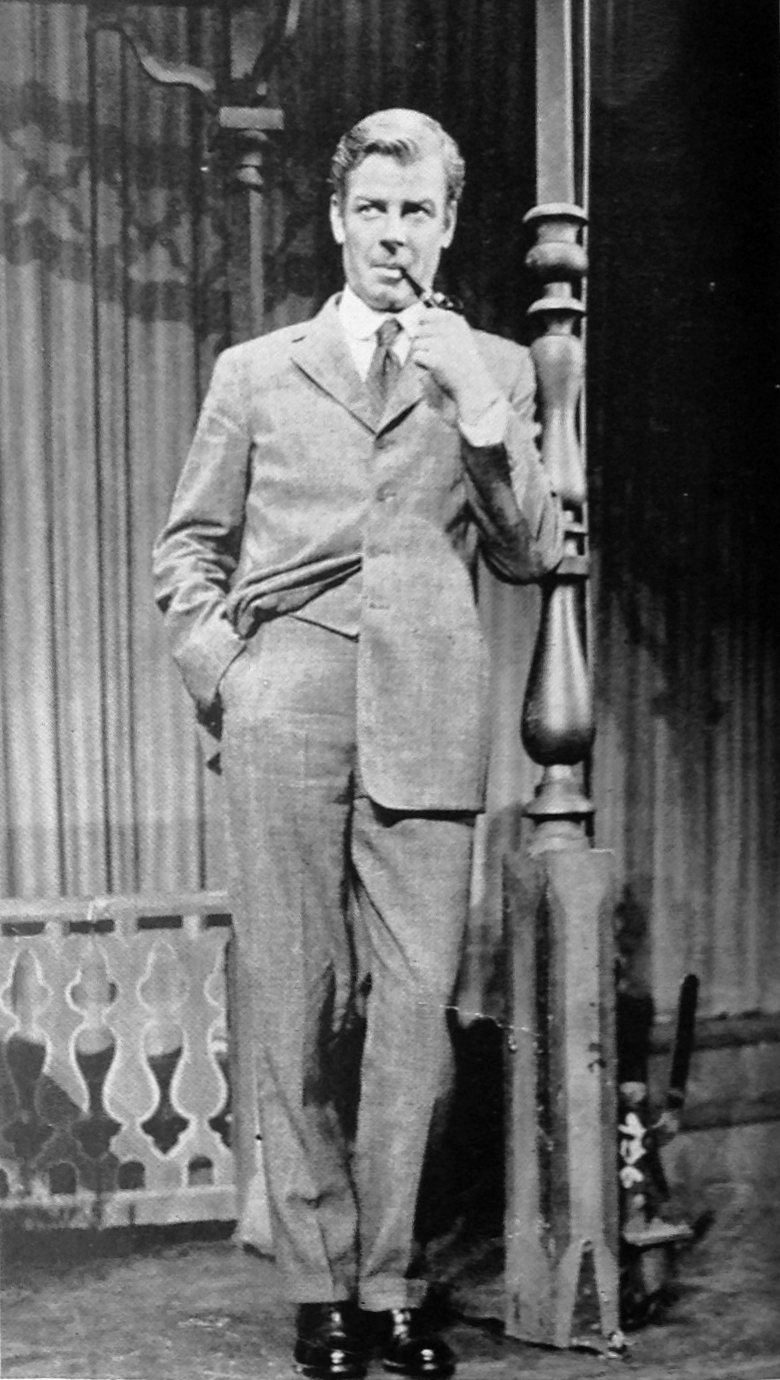
William Ching as Joe's father

At the freshman mixer ("Freshman Dance"), the audience finally sees Joe onstage. He marvels at his new world, in which he is a loner ("A Darn Nice Campus"). Joe serves ineffectively as a cheerleader ("The Purple and the Brown"), rooting for the Wildcats, whose star player is Joe's freshman classmate Charlie Townsend. Both are pre-medical students and soon become close friends. The friendship helps both; Joe gains entrance to Charlie's fraternity and social circles, while Charlie is allowed to copy Joe's conscientious schoolwork.

While Joe is at college, Jennie remains at home, and her wealthy father, Ned Brinker, who disapproves of Joe for spending so many years in school before earning a living, encourages her to find other boyfriends. Jennie does not bother to conceal these romances in her letters; Joe is finally fed up, and goes on a double date with Charlie and two girls. Beulah, Joe's date, is initially enthusiastic about the budding romance ("So Far") but walks away in disgust when Joe, who is unable to keep thoughts of Jennie from his mind, falls asleep after a passionate kiss. Jennie breaks up with the boy that Joe was afraid would marry her, and she is waiting for Joe when he returns home ("You Are Never Away"). Marjorie Taylor is convinced that Jennie is the wrong girl for Joe, and after a confrontation with Jennie when she tells her this, Marjorie dies of a heart attack. Despite the disapproval of both families ("What a Lovely Day for a Wedding"), Joe and Jennie marry, a wedding observed by the unhappy ghosts of Marjorie and Grandma ("Wish Them Well").

=== Act 2 ===
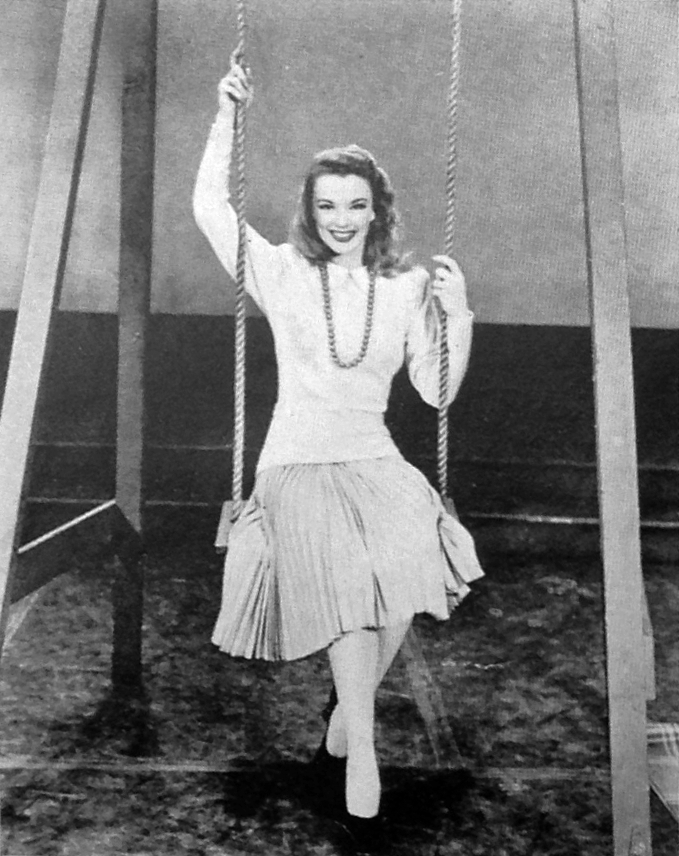
Roberta Jonay as Jennie

It is the Depression. Joe makes a bare living as assistant to his father. Mr. Brinker's business has failed, and he lives with the couple, who are experiencing poverty for the first time in their lives. The poverty affects Jennie more than Joe—the new Mrs. Taylor dislikes life as an impoverished housewife ("Money Isn't Everything"). When she learns that Joe turned down a lucrative offer from a prominent Chicago physician, who is Charlie's uncle, Jennie at first rages. When she finds that is not effective, she gets him to change his mind through guilt—if he accepts Dr. Denby's offer, he can earn the money to start the small hospital of which his father dreams and they will have the money to bring up a child properly.

Joe accepts the job, and sadly leaves his father. He soon finds himself ministering to hypochondriacs; he is required to spend time at cocktail parties marked by useless conversation ("Yatata, Yatata, Yatata"). Charlie is also part of the practice, but the former football star has turned to drink. Joe himself is becoming careless due to the distractions; one mistake is caught by his nurse, Emily, who thinks Joe is too careless, but is in love with him nonetheless ("The Gentleman Is a Dope"). Denby congratulates Joe on his skills, both medical and social. The elder doctor has less time for a nurse, Carrie Middleton, who has worked at his hospital for thirty years and once dated him, but who is involved in a labor protest—Denby orders her fired at the request of Lansdale, an influential trustee and soap manufacturer. Charlie, Joe and Emily comment on the frenetic pace of the Chicago world in which they live ("Allegro").

Joe has become increasingly disillusioned by his life in the city, and worries about his former patients in his home town. He learns that Jennie is having an affair with Lansdale. As Joe sits, head in hands, his late mother and a chorus of the friends he left behind appeal to him to return ("Come Home"). Joe has been offered the position of physician-in-chief at the Chicago hospital, replacing Denby, who is taking an executive position, or as the elder doctor terms it, being "kicked upstairs". At a dedication of a new pavilion at the hospital, Joe has a revelation and shifts the path of his life; as he does so, Grandma appears and calls for Marjorie to come watch, an echo of the scene in which he learned to walk. Joe refuses the position, and will return to his small town to assist his father, accompanied by Emily and Charlie, but not by Jennie (Finale: "One Foot, Other Foot" (reprise)).

== Musical numbers ==
Act I

- "Overture" – Orchestra
- "Joseph Taylor, Jr." – Ensemble
- "I Know It Can Happen Again" – Grandma Taylor
- "Pudgy Legs" – Ensemble
- "One Foot, Other Foot" – Ensemble
- "Children's Dance" – Orchestra with Children
- "Grandmother's Death: I Know It Can Happen Again (Reprise)" – Grandma Taylor
- "Winters Go By" – Ensemble
- "Poor Joe" – Ensemble
- "Diploma" – Ensemble
- "A Fellow Needs a Girl" – Dr. Taylor and Marjorie Taylor
- "Dance: Freshmen Get Together" – Orchestra with Ensemble
- "A Darn Nice Campus" – Joe Taylor
- "Wildcats" – Ensemble and Joe Taylor
- "Jennie Reads Letter: A Darn Nice Campus (Reprise)" – Jennie Brinker
- "Scene of Professors" – Professors, Joe Taylor, Jennie Brinker, and Ensemble
- "So Far" – Beulah
- "You Are Never Away" – Joe Taylor and Ensemble
- "You Are Never Away (Encore)" – Joe Taylor and Ensemble
- "Poor Joe (Reprise)" – Ensemble
- "What a Lovely Day for a Wedding" – Ensemble and Mr. Brinker
- "It May Be a Good Idea for Joe" – Charlie Townsend
- "Finale Act I: I Know It Can Happen Again/To Have and To Hold/Wish Them Well" – Ensemble

Act II

- "Entr'acte" – Orchestra
- "Money Isn't Everything" – Jennie Brinker and Other Wives
- "Dance: Money Isn't Everything" – Orchestra
- "Poor Joe (Reprise)" – Ensemble
- "You Are Never Away (Reprise)" – Joe Taylor
- "A Fellow Needs a Girl (Reprise)" – Majorie Taylor
- "Ya-ta-ta" – Charlie Townsend and Ensemble
- "The Gentleman Is a Dope" – Emily
- "Allegro" – Charlie Townsend, Joe Taylor, Emily and Ensemble
- "Allegro" Ballet – Orchestra with Ensemble
- "Come Home" – Marjorie Taylor and Ensemble
- "Finale Ultimo: Ya-ta-ta/Come Home/One Foot, Other Foot" – Ensemble

== Production history ==
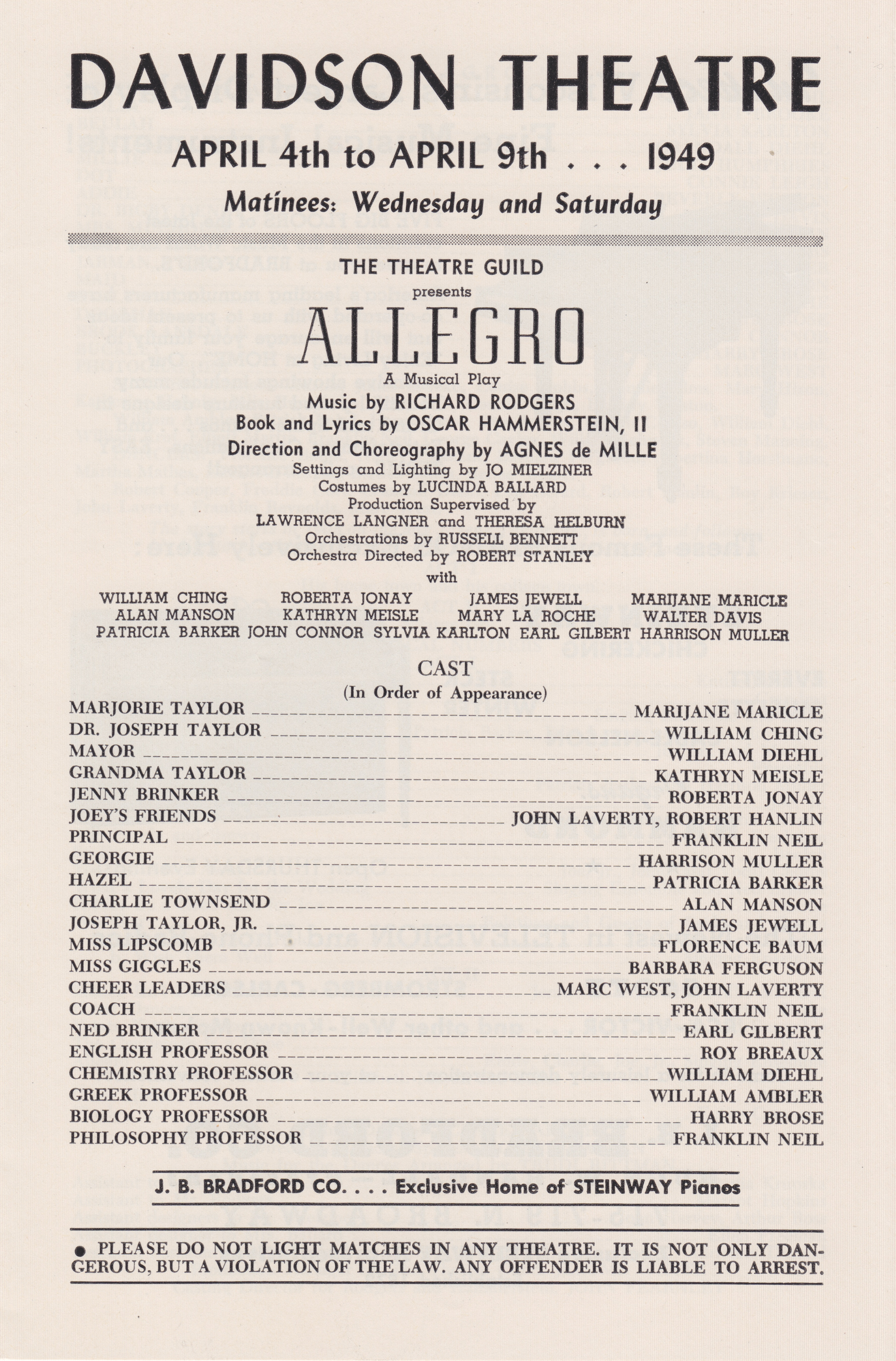
Program for Allegro's US tour, April 1949 (Davidson Theatre, Milwaukee)

Given the outstanding success of Oklahoma! and Carousel, Allegro was anticipated with close interest by the theatre community and public. The musical attracted $750,000 in advance sales, at a time when the top price ticket for a Broadway musical was $6.

Allegro opened on Broadway at the Majestic Theatre on October 10, 1947. It starred John Battles as Joseph Taylor Jr., Annamary Dickey as Majorie Taylor, William Ching as Dr. Joseph Taylor, Roberta Jonay as Jennie Brinker, Lisa Kirk as Emily, and John Conte as Charlie Townsend. A special performance the afternoon of the opening for friends and associates generated wild applause; the audience at the official opening that evening clapped little. As de Mille's husband, Walter Prude, put it, Allegro went over "like a wet firecracker".

The mixed reviews prompted ongoing discussions of the play's merit, continuing well after the first night. Some of the news that the show generated had nothing to do with its worth—de Mille had dancer Francis Rainer fired, and Rainer alleged that the dismissal was due to her union activism. After Actors' Equity became involved, Rainer was rehired. More bad publicity came when the producers proposed to dismiss several orchestra and chorus members to cut costs so the show might continue through the summer of 1948, and the fired performers also alleged dismissal for union involvement. The show closed July 11, 1948 after 315 performances, and in the fall, a national tour began. The national tour ran eight months, much shorter than that of Oklahoma! or Carousel. No London production was mounted. According to Thomas Hischak in his The Rodgers and Hammerstein Encyclopedia, the show made a small profit; other sources state that the show lost money.

The show was popular in the 1950s among amateur drama societies, because of the large cast with no star and the bare stage. It has rarely been revived professionally: the St. Louis Municipal Opera presented it in 1955; Goodspeed Musicals presented it in Connecticut in 1968. An abridged version was presented Off-Off-Broadway in 1978 by Equity Library Theatre.

In March 1994 a staged concert version was presented by New York City Center Encores!, with a cast that included Stephen Bogardus (Joseph Taylor Jr.), Karen Ziemba and Jonathan Hadary. Christopher Reeve was the narrator, and the concert was directed by Susan H. Schulman. A revised version of Allegro, re-written by Joe DiPietro, who was a protege of Oscar's son James Hammerstein, was produced at the Signature Theatre (Arlington, Virginia) in January 2004. This version cut the musical in size and scale. The cast was cut with some characters being combined; the original, lavish orchestrations were simplified.

== Music and recordings ==
=== Musical treatment ===
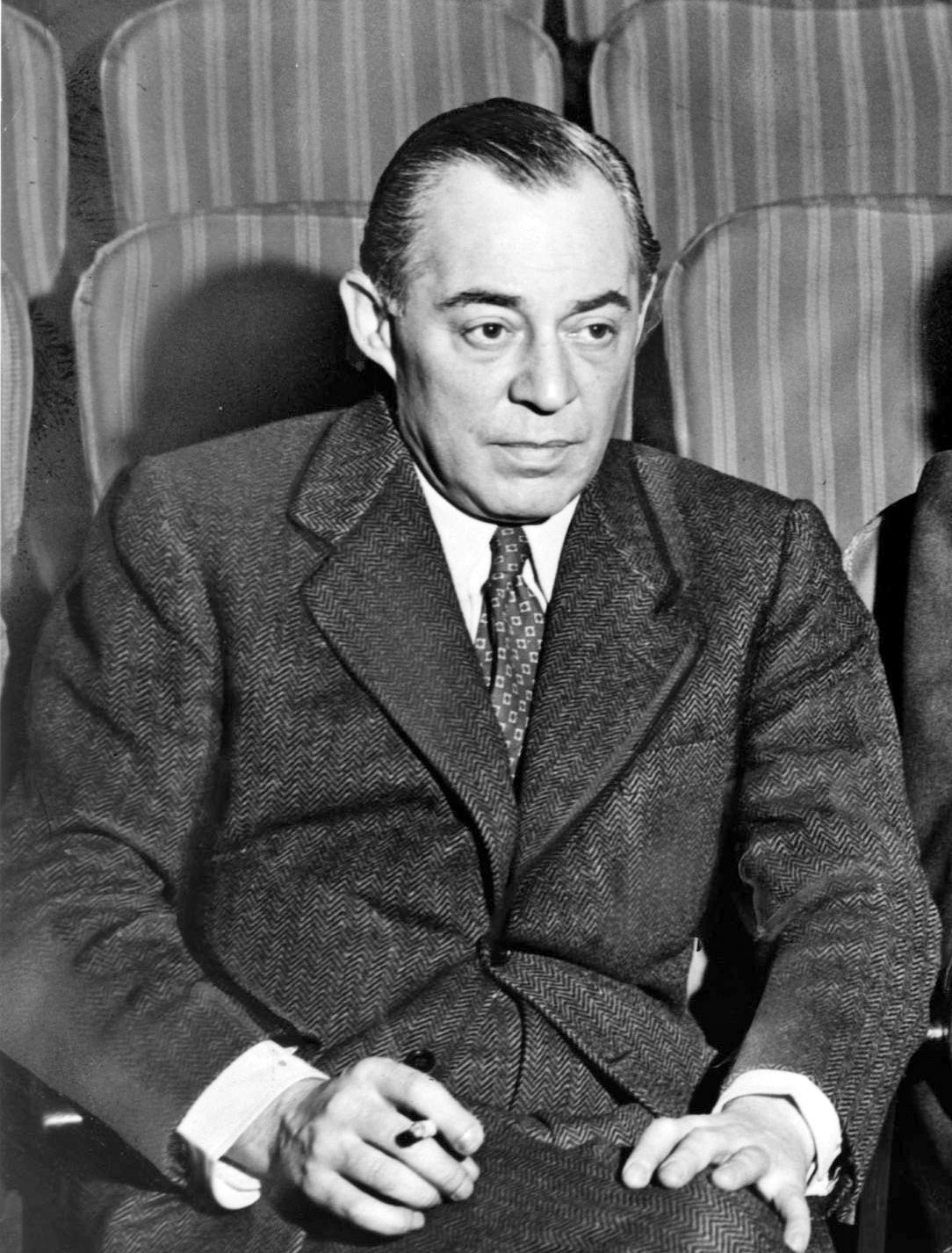
Richard Rodgers

Although Allegro is filled with music, the music is fragmented, as the characters often break into song briefly. The character of Joe was unusual for a male lead of the time in having relatively little to sing; Joe has only one solo number ("A Darn Nice Campus"). Important songs are given to minor characters, such as "So Far", given to Beulah, who only appears on the one date with Joe. Author and composer Ethan Mordden calls Rodgers's technique "the deconstruction of theatre music, to match the show's deconstruction of traditional theatre design".

Rodgers's music is more subtle than in his previous musicals, and his melodies more muted. The key changes are less dramatic than in other musicals of that time. Rodgers did not intend for the songs to become hits; instead they were designed to draw the audience into the action, as onstage events were described subjectively in song.

=== Recordings ===
An original cast recording was released in 1947, heavily abridged. According to Hischak, only Lisa Kirk as Emily shines on the recording, which he calls "sad evidences of a very ambitious undertaking". Originally issued by RCA Victor Records on five 78s, sales were poor; Victor did not reissue it on LP during the rapid transition from 78s to long-playing records in 1949–1950, when most record companies were hastily transferring their entire catalogues onto the new medium. The recording was made available briefly in simulated stereo in the 1960s, and was reissued in the 1970s in the original mono. (Note: Mordden, Broadway Babies, p. 288) The original cast recording was released on compact disc in 1993.

A studio recording of the complete score was made in 2008, with an all-star cast featuring Patrick Wilson as Joe, Nathan Gunn and Audra McDonald as his parents, Marni Nixon as Grandma, Laura Benanti as Jennie, Liz Callaway as Emily, Judy Kuhn as Beulah, Norbert Leo Butz as Charlie, with special appearances by Stephen Sondheim, Schuyler Chapin and, through archival audio recordings, Oscar Hammerstein. The album, produced by Sony Masterworks Broadway, was released on February 3, 2009. According to musical theatre author John Kenrick, "this all star studio cast glorifies all that is right with this melodious and sometimes adventurous score".

Frank Sinatra took 'A Fellow Needs a Girl' to Number 24 in 1947. Another song from the musical, 'So Far', was the B-Side of the 78 rpm record.

== Critical reception ==
The musical received mixed reviews following its opening night. The New York Times critic Brooks Atkinson opined that Rodgers and Hammerstein had "just missed the final splendor of a perfect work of art". Robert Coleman of the New York Daily Mirror stated that "Allegro is perfection", and added that it was "a stunning blending of beauty, integrity, intelligence, imagination, taste and skill ... it lends new stature to the American musical stage". Ward Morehouse of The Sun wrote that Allegro was "distinguished and tumultuous. It takes its place alongside of Oklahoma! and Carousel as a theatrical piece of taste, imagination, and showmanship."

However, Wolcott Gibbs of The New Yorker called the musical "a shocking disappointment". Robert Garland, in the New York Journal American suggested that Rodgers and Hammerstein "had confused allegro [which means at a fast pace] with, say, lento, which means 'slow', 'unhurried', and even downright 'serious'". Critic George Jean Nathan, in a special piece in the Journal American, decried "such hokum mush as the familiar wedding scene and the ghost of a mother who returns at intervals to keep her son from error, but a cocktail party chatterbox number paraphrased from an old Noël Coward movie, a college number dittoed from an earlier George Abbott one, and various other elements hardly rivaling the daisy in freshness". In Theatre Arts, Cecil Smith called Allegro "acceptable only as an exercise in stagecraft, not as a work of art ... Allegro fails where Our Town succeeded ... Joseph Taylor, Jr.'s life has little or nothing to tell us about our own lives." Louis Kronenberger of New York P.M. called the show "an out-and-out failure."

De Mille's direction and choreography were reviewed generally positively; Cecil Smith applauded her for the "ease and flawless design with which Miss de Mille brings mobility to these non-dancing [singing and speaking choruses] ... no previous musical has approached Allegro in consistency of movement, expertness of timing and shapeliness of visual patterns. Times dance critic John Martin stated, "Allegro has definitely made history" for de Mille's giving "form and substance to material with little of either". Dance Magazine praised her for creating "the illusion of space and depth far beyond the confines of the proscenium".

As the disagreement continued past the opening night, Wayne Abrams wrote in the Chicago Sun-Times, "Nobody is neutral about Allegro. The Hammerstein-Rodgers-de Mille musical play is either nigh unto perfection or a dismal flop. There's that much room for disagreement."

== Aftermath ==
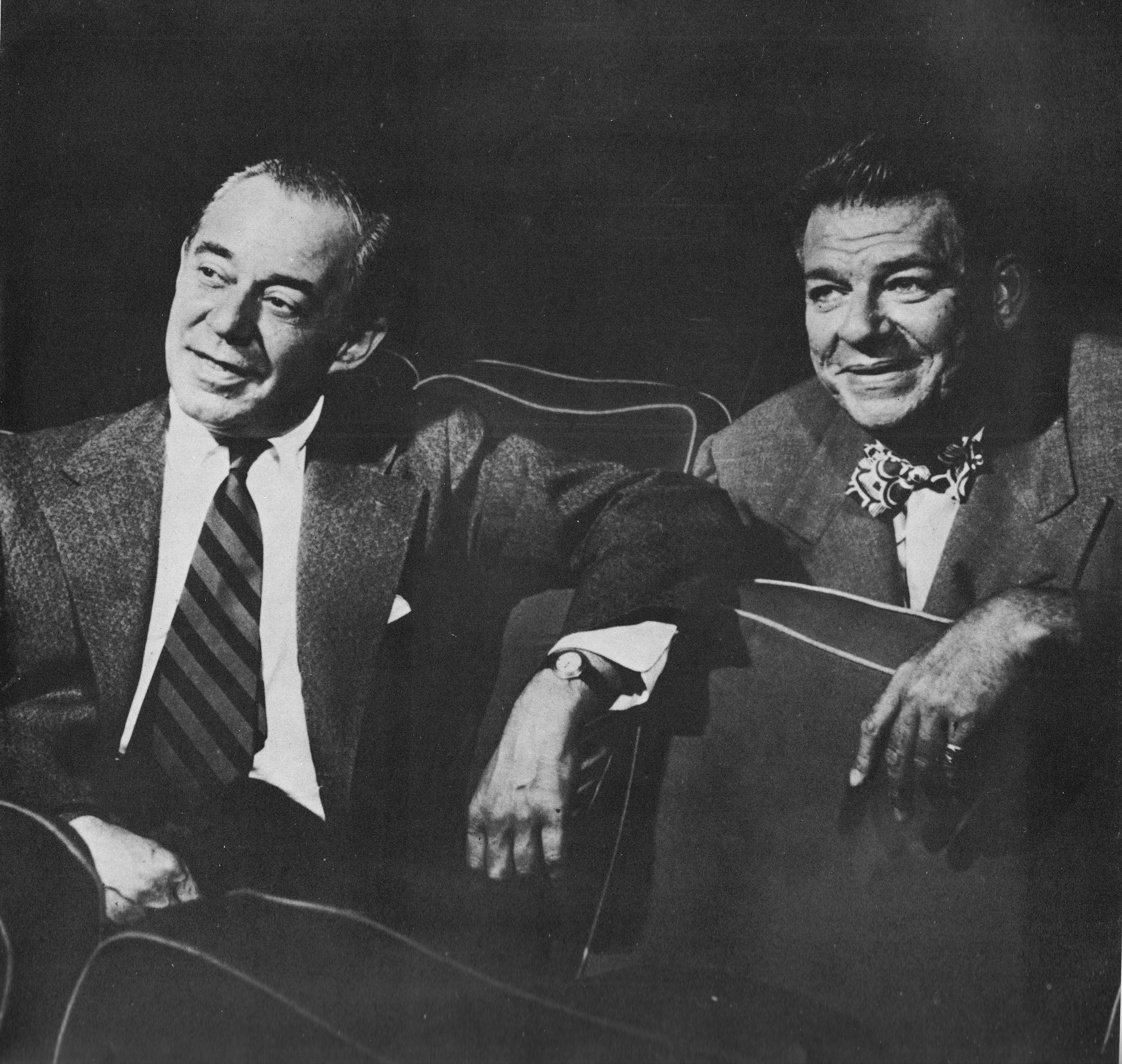
Rodgers (left) and Hammerstein

Hammerstein was embittered by audience and critical reaction to his book, and felt they misunderstood it. Public perception was that Hammerstein had implied that small-town folk were good while their big-city cousins were neurotic and venal. The lyricist objected, pointing out that the worst character in the musical was a small-town girl, but according to Hammerstein biographer Hugh Fordin, "he knew it was his fault that the message was not clear." In a preface to the published script, issued in 1948, Hammerstein tried again to make his point:

It is a law of our civilization, that as soon as a man proves he can contribute to the well-being of the world, there be created an immediate conspiracy to destroy his usefulness, a conspiracy in which he is usually a willing collaborator. Sometimes he awakens to his danger and does something about it.

According to Frederick Nolan, in his book about the pair's music, "Reexamined today, Allegro's main fault seems to have been that it was ahead of its time, the integration of story and music far too advanced even for audiences now becoming accustomed to musicals which actually had stories." Sondheim noted, "Allegro was an attempt to use epic theatre in contemporary musical theatre. It used a Greek chorus, and tried to tell the story of a life, not through events but through generalities. This is now what would be called a Brechtian approach."

A decade after Allegro's premiere, after learning of his terminal cancer, Hammerstein returned to the musical, hoping to correct its flaws, but he did not complete the project. While recording an oral history tape for Columbia University, Hammerstein stated, "I intended Dick to write music for it [the chorus in Allegro] but we wound up reciting the chorus instead ... I'm not blaming anyone, because we all accepted it, we all collaborated ... but it was a mistake." Rodgers later stated that the show was "too preachy, which was the one fault that Oscar had, if any," and "[n]othing to be ashamed of, certainly". Rodgers further defended the play, "The comments we made on the compromises demanded by success, as well as some of the satiric side issues—hypochondria, the empty cocktail party—still hold."

The relative failure of Allegro reinforced the team's determination to have another hit. Author James Michener recalled his meeting with the duo over the possibility of converting his book Tales of the South Pacific into a musical. "They were inwardly burning because of the reception accorded to Allegro. Those fellows were so mad I was fairly certain that they could make a great musical out of the Bronx telephone directory." That project would become South Pacific and be a tremendous hit.

Hischak ties the failure of Allegro to a change in the pair's style:

The failure of Allegro only partially tarnished the reputation of Rodgers and Hammerstein; after all, it was a very respectable flop. Yet the long-term repercussions were more serious. Never again would R&H experiment so boldly and risk losing their audience. They would continue to come up with surprising and wonderful things, but the days of radical and foolhardy innovation were over. From then on they would stick to the tried and true. Allegro marked the end of the R&H revolution.

== Awards and nominations ==
=== Original Broadway production ===
Year	Award Ceremony	Category	Nominee	Result	Ref
1947	Donaldson Award	Best Book of a Musical	Oscar Hammerstein II	Won	
1947	Donaldson Award	Best Lyrics	Oscar Hammerstein II	Won	
1947	Donaldson Award	Best Score	Richard Rodgers	Won	
