= One Look =

- US 7-inch single

Single by Johnny Mathis

from the album Johnny's Newest Hits
- A-side: "Sweet Thursday"
- Released: December 29, 1961
- Recorded: October 9, 1961
- Genre: Pop
- Length: 2:47
- Label: Columbia
- Songwriter: Arthur Hamilton
- Producer: Irving Townsend

Johnny Mathis singles chronology
"Wasn't the Summer Short?" (1961)	"Sweet Thursday" / "One Look" (1961)	"Marianna" (1962)

Music video
- "One Look" on YouTube

"One Look" is a popular song written by Arthur Hamilton that was recorded by Johnny Mathis in 1961. It made the top ten in the Philippines in 1962.

== Recording and release ==
Johnny Mathis recorded "One Look" on October 9, 1961. It was produced by Irving Townsend and released as a single two months later, on December 29.

== Chart performance ==
"One Look" spent one week on Music Vendor magazine's Going Up – Heading for the Top 100 chart at 126 in the issue dated January 15, 1962. On the pop chart in the Philippines, it got as high as number 4.

== Critical reception ==
In their review column, the editors of Cash Box gave the song a letter grade of B+. They wrote, "More strong romanticizing from the star." The editors of Billboard categorized the single as a "Spotlight Winner", one of the best of the week's new releases, and wrote, "Here's one of Mathis's strongest performances in a spell. It's a pretty ballad, meaningfully chanted, against a lush string and woodwind backing."

== Charts ==
Weekly chart performance for "One Look"
Chart (1962)	Peak position
Philippines	4
US Going Up – Heading for the Top 100 (Music Vendor)	126

== Bibliography ==
- Whitburn, Joel (2012), Joel Whitburn's Hit Records 101-150 1959-1982, Record Research Inc., ISBN 978-0-89820-201-4
