= I Only Have Eyes for You (disambiguation) =

"I Only Have Eyes for You" is a popular song by composer Harry Warren and lyricist Al Dubin and performed by many artists.

I Only Have Eyes for You may also refer to:

- "I Only Have Eyes for You" (Buffy the Vampire Slayer), a 1998 television episode
- I Only Have Eyes for You (film), a 1937 Merrie Melodies animated short film based on the song
- I Only Have Eyes for You (Lester Bowie album), a 1985 album by Lester Bowie's Brass Fantasy featuring a version of the song
- I Only Have Eyes for You (Eddie "Lockjaw" Davis album), a 1962 album by saxophonist Eddie "Lockjaw" Davis featuring a version of the song
- I Only Have Eyes for You (Johnny Mathis album), 1976
