= Marianna (song) =

- US 7-inch single

Single by Johnny Mathis

from the album Johnny's Newest Hits
- B-side: "Unaccustomed As I Am"
- Released: April 27, 1962
- Recorded: March 29, 1962
- Genre: Pop
- Length: 2:53
- Label: Columbia
- Songwriters: Alfred Newman; Paul Francis Webster
- Producer: Irving Townsend

Johnny Mathis singles chronology
"Sweet Thursday" / "One Look" (1961)	"Marianna" (1962)	"Tonight" (1962)

Music video
- "Marianna" on YouTube "Marianna" (live, The Ed Sullivan Show, 1962) on YouTube

"Marianna" is a popular song written by Alfred Newman and Paul Francis Webster for the 1962 film The Counterfeit Traitor. It was recorded by Johnny Mathis and charted that same year.

== Recording and release ==
Johnny Mathis recorded "Marianna" on March 29, 1962, with an orchestra conducted by Pete King. It was produced by Irving Townsend and released as a single one month later, on April 27.

== Chart performance ==
"Marianna" spent its sole week on the Billboard Hot 100 in the issue of the magazine dated June 16, 1962, at number 86. It reached number 13 on Cash Box magazine's Looking Ahead chart, which was described as a "compilation, in order of strength, of up and coming records showing signs of breaking into The Cash Box Top 100". It peaked at 85 on the Top 100 Pop Sales and Performance chart in Music Vendor magazine.

== Critical reception ==
In their review column, the editors of Cash Box featured the single as their Pick of the Week, which was their equivalent to a letter grade of A for both "Marianna" and its B-side, "Unaccustomed As I Am". They described "Marianna" as a "haunting ballad". They also wrote, "Top drawer ork-choral credits belong to Pete King." The editors of Billboard wrote that Mathis sang the song "with much warmth. It's a lovely floating melody that's done with a fine string section and mixed chorus embellishing the background."

== Live performance ==
Mathis performed "Marianna" on The Ed Sullivan Show on April 29, 1962.

== Charts ==
Weekly chart performance for "Marianna"
Chart (1962)	Peak position
US Billboard Hot 100	86
US Looking Ahead (Cash Box)	13
US Top 100 Pop Sales and Performance (Music Vendor)	85

== Bibliography ==
- Whitburn, Joel (2012), Joel Whitburn's Hit Records 1954-1982, Record Research Inc., ISBN 978-0-89820-200-7
