= Music from Lerner & Loewe's Camelot =

Studio album by Percy Faith and His Orchestra
- Released: December 1960
- Genre: Easy listening
- Label: Columbia

Music from Lerner & Loewe's Camelot is a 1960 album by Percy Faith and His Orchestra. It was released in December 1960 by Columbia Records (catalog no. CL1570). It debuted on Billboard magazine's pop album chart on January 9, 1961, peaked at the No. 6 spot, and remained on the chart for ten weeks.

== Track listing ==
Side A

1. "March"
2. "I Wonder What the King Is Doing Tonight"
3. "The Simple Joys of Maidenhood"
4. "Camelot"
5. "Follow Me"
6. "The Lusty Month of May"

Side B

1. "Then You May Take Me to the Fair"
2. "How to Handle a Woman"
3. "If Ever I Would Leave You"
4. "What Do the Simple Folks Do"
5. "I Loved You Once in Silence"
6. "Guinevere"
