= Sweet Thursday (song) =

- US 7-inch single

Single by Johnny Mathis

from the album Johnny's Newest Hits
- B-side: "One Look"
- Released: December 29, 1961
- Recorded: October 9, 1961
- Genre: Pop
- Length: 2:31
- Label: Columbia
- Songwriters: Jerry Livingston; Paul Francis Webster
- Producer: Irving Townsend

Johnny Mathis singles chronology
"Wasn't the Summer Short?" / "There You Are" (1961)	"Sweet Thursday" / "One Look" (1961)	"Marianna" (1962)

Music video
- "Sweet Thursday" on YouTube

"Sweet Thursday" is a popular song written by Jerry Livingston and Paul Francis Webster that was recorded by Johnny Mathis in 1961. It charted in 1962.

== Recording and release ==
Johnny Mathis recorded "Sweet Thursday" on October 9, 1961. It was produced by Irving Townsend and released as a single two months later, on December 29.

== Chart performance ==
"Sweet Thursday" debuted on the Billboard Hot 100 in the issue of the magazine dated March 17, 1962, and peaked at number 99 three weeks later, in the April 7 issue. The song was only on the Hot 100 in those two issues. It reached number 75 on Cash Box magazine's best seller list and number 77 on the Top 100 Pop Sales and Performance chart in Music Vendor magazine. On the pop chart in the British West Indies, it got as high as number 10.

== Critical reception ==
In their review column, the editors of Cash Box gave the song a letter grade of B+. They wrote, "Songster does pro ballad warble on a very pleasing tale of love-found. Legit full ork backing has an amiable light-beat touch." The editors of Billboard categorized the single as a "Spotlight Winner", one of the best of the week's new releases.

== Charts ==
Weekly chart performance for "Sweet Thursday"
Chart (1962)	Peak position
British West Indies	10
US Billboard Hot 100	99
US Top 100 Best Selling Tunes on Records (Cash Box)	75
US Top 100 Pop Sales and Performance (Music Vendor)	77

== Bibliography ==
- Whitburn, Joel (2012), Joel Whitburn's Hit Records 1954-1982, Record Research Inc., ISBN 978-0-89820-200-7
- Whitburn, Joel (2014), Joel Whitburn's Cash Box Pop Hits 1952-1996, Record Research Inc., ISBN 978-0-89820-209-0
