= Look at Me Now! (Dick Haymes album) =

Studio album by Dick Haymes
- Released: 1957
- Genre: Pop, jazz
- Label: Hollywood

Professional ratings
Review scores
Source	Rating
Allmusic	link

Look at Me Now! is an album from Dick Haymes. Released in 1957, with Cy Coleman at the piano, arranged & conducted by Maury Laws. As his previous albums for Capitol had been unsuccessful, Haymes struck out on his own with this LP. He had been turned down by all of the major labels and he eventually used a small Los Angeles company to distribute the album. Christopher Loudon writing in Jazz Times commented: "Though the album features decent (if occasionally overwhelming) arrangements, backing by the Maury Laws Orchestra and Cy Coleman at the piano, the limits of Haymes’ financial backing are evident in the extremely poor production values. So budget-driven was the project that, to reduce royalty fees, only 10 of the dozen recorded tracks were included on the finished album."

== Track listing ==
Side 1:

1. You Stepped Out of a Dream
2. This Time the Dream's on Me
3. You're My Girl (Jule Styne / Sammy Cahn)
4. My Heart Stood Still
5. A Sinner Kissed an Angel (Ray Joseph / Mack David)

Side 2:

1. Cheek to Cheek
2. So Far
3. On a Slow Boat to China
4. The Riviera (Cy Coleman / Joseph Allen McCarthy).
5. Oh! Look at Me Now
