= Gina (song) =

- US picture sleeve

Single by Johnny Mathis

from the album Johnny's Newest Hits
- B-side: "I Love Her That's Why"
- Released: September 7, 1962
- Recorded: August 9, 1962
- Genre: Traditional pop
- Length: 2:50
- Label: Columbia
- Songwriters: Leon Carr, Paul Vance
- Producer: Ernie Altschuler

Johnny Mathis singles chronology
"That's the Way It Is" / "I'll Never Be Lonely Again" (1962)	"Gina" (1962)	"What Will Mary Say" (1963)

Music video
- "Gina" on YouTube

"Gina" is a song written by Leon Carr and Paul Vance that was recorded by Johnny Mathis in 1962. His version made the top ten on Billboard magazine's Hot 100 and Easy Listening charts.

== Background ==
"Gina" was written for an episode of the CBS television series Diagnosis: Unknown titled "Gina, Gina" that aired on September 6, 1960. Jazz guitarist and vocalist Johnny Janis made his acting debut in the episode as a singer, and the airing of the episode coincided with the release of his recording of the song, which was arranged and conducted by Glenn Osser.

In their review column, the editors of Cash Box magazine featured the Janis single as their Pick of the Week, which was their equivalent to a letter grade of A for both "Gina" and its B-side, "If the Good Lord's Willin'". They described "Gina" as "a tender romantic ballad" and his performance "impressive". The editors of Billboard gave the recording four stars out of five and wrote, "Rich warbling style." It did not chart, however.

== Johnny Mathis version ==
Johnny Mathis recorded the song on August 9, 1962, with an orchestra conducted by arranger Don Costa. It was produced by Ernie Altschuler and released as a single one month later, on September 7.

=== Chart performance ===
"Gina" debuted on the Billboard Hot 100 in the issue of the magazine dated September 22, 1962, and peaked at number 6 two months later, in the November 17 issue. The song was on the Hot 100 for 12 weeks. In the September 29 issue, it became his first song to appear on the magazine's Easy Listening chart, where it spent 11 weeks and got as high as number 2. It reached number 8 on both Cash Box magazine's best seller list and the Top 100 Pop Sales and Performance chart in Music Vendor magazine. It peaked at number 3 in Hong Kong and number 10 in the Philippines.

=== Critical reception ===
In their review column, the editors of Cash Box magazine also featured the Mathis single as their Pick of the Week, this time giving a letter grade of A to both "Gina" and its B-side, "I Love Her That's Why". They wrote, "The velvety-voiced song stylist comes up with his most commercial dates in quite a while. It’s an ultra-lovely soft Latin beat-ballad romancer, devoted to 'Gina,' that Mathis and the Don Costa ork-chorus deliver in superb style." The editors of Billboard categorized the single as one of the "Spotlight Singles of the Week", which were the strongest of the new releases, and wrote, "Here's a real winner for the lad with the velvet larynx. Johnny sings the lovely ballad against smart backing with strings and vocal chorus that has a contemporary feel."

== Charts ==
Weekly chart performance for "Gina"
Chart (1962)	Peak position
Hong Kong	3
Philippines	10
US Billboard Easy Listening	2
US Billboard Hot 100	6
US Top 100 Best Selling Tunes on Records (Cash Box)	8
US Top 100 Pop Sales and Performance (Music Vendor)	8

== Bibliography ==
- Whitburn, Joel (2012), Joel Whitburn's Hit Records 1954-1982, Record Research Inc., ISBN 978-0-89820-200-7
- Whitburn, Joel (2014), Joel Whitburn's Cash Box Pop Hits 1952-1996, Record Research Inc., ISBN 978-0-89820-209-0
