= Portrait of Johnny =

Greatest hits album by Johnny Mathis
- Released: July 17, 1961
- Recorded: 1959–1961
- Genre: Vocal
- Length: 33:11
- Label: Columbia
- Producers: Al Ham; Mitch Miller; Irving Townsend; Frank DeVol

Johnny Mathis chronology
I'll Buy You a Star (1961)	Portrait of Johnny (1961)	Live It Up! (1961)

Portrait of Johnny is a compilation album by Johnny Mathis that was released by Columbia Records on July 17, 1961, and described on the cover as "The Third in the Johnny Mathis Greatest Hits Series". Seven B-sides of chart hits are included along with four of the corresponding A-sides that made it onto the Billboard Hot 100 or "bubbled under" it and one song ("Should I Wait (Or Should I Run to Her)") from a single that had neither side chart in Billboard magazine.

In the "Spotlight Albums of the Week" column in the issue of Billboard dated July 31, 1961, a description of the release states, "A deluxe merchandising effort is represented here, with the fine color cover painting of Mathis, reproduced in a gold titled frame, which is attached to the liner.

The album entered the magazine's Top LPs chart a month later, in the issue dated August 28, spending 63 weeks on the chart, seven of which at its peak position of number two.

== Reception ==
Professional ratings
Review scores
Source	Rating
AllMusic	3.5/5 stars
Billboard	positive
New Record Mirror	5/5
The Encyclopedia of Popular Music	4/5 stars

AllMusic's Joe Viglione wrote, "The liner notes read like a good biography from a PR firm, better fare than '60s albums usually offered for the album jackets, but there's no clarification on where this material was culled from." He concludes, "The disc sounds like a pastiche, but as always, with the sublime voice of Johnny Mathis as the common denominator, it is as entertaining as ever and perhaps more interesting than usual with all the musical changes on each track."

== Track listing ==
Recording and release dates are taken from the liner notes of The Singles (2015).

=== Side one ===
1. "Starbright" (Lee Pockriss, Paul Vance) – 2:48
  - rec. 4/29/59, rel. 2/15/60; Billboard Hot 100: 25
2. "While You're Young" (Barbara Hayden, Tony Romano) – 2:54
  - rec. 5/1/59, rel. 11/7/60; B-side of "How to Handle a Woman"
3. "Should I Wait (Or Should I Run to Her)" (Leon Carr, Paul Vance) – 2:48
  - rec. 2/8/61, rel. 4/24/61; non-charting single
4. "All Is Well" (Jerry Leiber, Mike Stoller) – 2:31
  - rec. 5/1/59, rel. 2/15/60; B-side of "Starbright"
5. "You Set My Heart to Music" from the 1960 Broadway musical 13 Daughters (Eaton Magoon Jr.) – 2:46
  - rec. 3/4/61, rel. 3/20/61; Bubbling Under the Hot 100 chart: 107
6. "My Love for You" (Abner Silver, Sid Wayne) – 3:07
  - rec. 5/31/60, rel. 7/25/60; Billboard Hot 100: 47

=== Side two ===
1. "Oh That Feeling" (Jack Segal, Paul Vance) – 2:36
  - rec. 5/31/60, rel. 7/25/60; B-side of "My Love for You"
2. "How to Handle a Woman" from the 1960 Broadway musical Camelot (Alan Jay Lerner, Frederick Loewe) – 3:02
  - rec. 10/27/60, rel. 11/7/60; Billboard Hot 100: 64
3. "Cherie" (Michael Coldin, Tony Prescott) – 2:49
  - rec. 5/1/59, rel. 9/28/59; B-side of 1959 single "The Best of Everything"
4. "Hey Love" (Lee Pockriss, Paul Vance) – 2:28
  - rec. 5/1/59, rel. 5/9/60; B-side of 1960 single "Maria"
5. "Jenny" (Jack Segal, Paul Vance) – 2:58
  - rec. 2/8/61, rel. 3/20/61; B-side of "You Set My Heart to Music"; "Bubbling Under the Hot 100" chart: 118
6. "The Story of Our Love" (Michael Colicchio, Anthony Piano) – 2:24
  - rec. 4/29/59, rel. 9/14/59; B-side of 1959 single "Misty"

== Personnel ==
- Johnny Mathis – vocals
- Al Ham – producer (except as noted)
- Mitch Miller – producer ("How to Handle a Woman", "My Love for You", "Oh That Feeling", "While You're Young")
- Irving Townsend – producer ("Jenny", "Should I Wait (Or Should I Run to Her)")
- Frank DeVol – producer ("You Set My Heart to Music")
- Ralph Cowan – cover painting

== Bibliography ==
- Whitburn, Joel (2009), Joel Whitburn's Top Pop Singles, 1955-2008, Record Research Inc., ISBN 0898201802
- Whitburn, Joel (2010), Joel Whitburn Presents Top Pop Albums, Seventh Edition, Record Research Inc., ISBN 0-89820-183-7
