= Laurie, My Love =

- US 7-inch single

Single by Johnny Mathis
- B-side: "Should I Wait (Or Should I Run to Her)"
- Released: June 16, 1961
- Recorded: March 4, 1961
- Genre: Pop
- Length: 2:26
- Label: Columbia
- Songwriters: Jerry Livingston; Paul Francis Webster
- Producer: Frank De Vol

Johnny Mathis singles chronology
"You Set My Heart to Music" / "Jenny" (1961)	"Laurie, My Love" (1961)	"Wasn't the Summer Short?" (1961)

Music video
- "Laurie, My Love" on YouTube

"Laurie, My Love" is a popular song written by Jerry Livingston and Paul Francis Webster that was recorded by Johnny Mathis in 1961. It charted that same year.

== Recording and release ==
Johnny Mathis recorded "Laurie, My Love" with an orchestra conducted by Ray Ellis on March 4, 1961. It was produced by Frank De Vol and released as a single three months later, on June 16.

== Chart performance ==
"Laurie, My Love" peaked at number 78 on the Top 100 Pop Sales and Performance chart in Music Vendor magazine in July 1961.

== Critical reception ==
In their review column, the editors of Cash Box magazine featured the single as their Pick of the Week, which was their equivalent to a letter grade of A for both "Laurie, My Love" and its B-side, "Should I Wait (Or Should I Run to Her)". They praised Mathis's "beautifully sensitive portrayal of 'Laurie, My Love'. It's a charming lilter, with a folk-like quality, that Mathis and the Ray Ellis ork-chorus paint with warmth." The editors of Billboard gave the song three stars and wrote, "A pretty ballad by Mathis with strong folk overtones. It moves with a slow, pensive quality."

== Charts ==
Weekly chart performance for "Laurie, My Love"
Chart (1961)	Peak position
US Top 100 Pop Sales and Performance (Music Vendor)	78

== Bibliography ==
- Whitburn, Joel (2012), Joel Whitburn's Hit Records 1954-1982, Record Research Inc., ISBN 978-0-89820-200-7
