= My Love for You (Johnny Mathis song) =

- US 7-inch single

Single by Johnny Mathis

from the album Portrait of Johnny
- B-side: "Oh That Feeling"
- Released: July 25, 1960
- Recorded: May 31, 1960
- Genre: Pop
- Length: 3:08
- Label: Columbia
- Songwriters: Abner Silver; Sid Wayne
- Producer: Mitch Miller

Johnny Mathis singles chronology
"Maria" (1960)	"My Love for You" (1960)	"How to Handle a Woman" (1960)

Music video
- "My Love for You" on YouTube

"My Love for You" is a popular song written by Abner Silver and Sid Wayne that was recorded by Johnny Mathis in 1960. It was moderately successful on the record charts in the US and made the top ten in the UK.

== Recording and release ==
Johnny Mathis recorded "My Love for You" on May 31, 1960, with an orchestra conducted by Glenn Osser. It was produced by Mitch Miller and released as a single two months later, on July 25.

== Chart performance ==
"My Love for You" debuted on the Billboard Hot 100 in the issue of the magazine dated August 29, 1960, and peaked at number 47 six weeks later, the week ending October 10. The song stayed on the Hot 100 for 11 weeks. It reached number 35 on Cash Box magazine's best seller list. On the UK Singles Chart it peaked at number nine.

== Critical reception ==
In their review column, the editors of Cash Box magazine featured the single as their Pick of the Week, which was their equivalent to a letter grade of A for "My Love for You" and its B-side, "Oh That Feeling". They combined some of their comments for both songs, writing, "Johnny's in top vocal form on both ends. Likewise for the Glenn Osser outfit, instrumentally." They described "My Love for You" as a "warm, ear-arresting ballad". The editors of Billboard categorized the single as a "Spotlight Winner", one of the best of the week's new releases, and wrote, "Mathis warbles with his usual warmth and feeling on 'My Love for You,' a pretty ballad."

== Charts ==
Weekly chart performance for "My Love for You"
Chart (1960)	Peak position
UK Singles Chart	9
US Billboard Hot 100	47
US Top 100 Best Selling Tunes on Records (Cash Box)	35

== Bibliography ==
- Whitburn, Joel (2014), Joel Whitburn's Cash Box Pop Hits 1952-1996, Record Research Inc., ISBN 978-0-89820-209-0
