= Ace in the Hole (Cole Porter song) =

- Original poster for Let's Face It!

Song by Mary Jane Walsh & Nanette Fabray
- Genre: Musical theatre
- Songwriter: Cole Porter

"Ace in the Hole" is a popular song composed by Cole Porter. The song was written expressly for Porter's musical Let's Face It! which debuted at New York City's Imperial Theatre on 29 October 1941. In the original production, "Ace in the Hole" was performed by Mary Jane Walsh (as Winnie Potter) and Nanette Fabray (as Jean Blanchard). The song was one of the hits of the show throughout its 547 performances on Broadway and its 1943 movie adaptation.

== Copyright status ==
The song was copyrighted in 1941 by the music publisher Chappell & Co. which transferred the renewed copyright to John F. Wharton, Trustee of the Cole Porter Musical & Literary Property Trusts.

== Notable recordings ==
- Mabel Mercer - Sings Cole Porter (1955)
- Ella Fitzgerald - Ella Fitzgerald Sings the Cole Porter Songbook (1956)
- Johnny Mathis - Live It Up! (1961)
- Joel Grey - Only the Beginning (1967)/Black Sheep Boy (1969)
