= What Will Mary Say =

Single by Johnny Mathis

from the album Johnny's Newest Hits
- B-side: "Quiet Girl"
- Released: January 4, 1963
- Recorded: August 9, 1962
- Genre: Easy Listening
- Length: 3:10
- Label: Columbia
- Songwriters: Eddie Snyder, Paul Vance
- Producer: Ernie Altschuler

Johnny Mathis singles chronology
"Gina" (1962)	"What Will Mary Say" (1963)	"Every Step of the Way" (1963)

Music video
- "What Will Mary Say" on YouTube

"What Will Mary Say", also recorded as "What Will My Mary Say", is a popular song written by Eddie Snyder and Paul Vance that was recorded by Johnny Mathis in 1962. His recording reached the top ten charts in the US and Hong Kong and was also a hit in the UK.

== Background ==
The song is about an affair that the singer wants to end, fearing that his true love would be angry in finding out and walk out on him. It was first recorded as "What Will My Mary Say" by Mark Dinning and released as a single in 1961 but did not chart. The editors of Billboard gave the recording four stars out of five and wrote, "The ballad starts with a soft, pleading fem[ale] voice to the chanter not to go. Dinning hands it a pretty, crooning-style vocal."

== Johnny Mathis version ==
Johnny Mathis recorded the song as "What Will Mary Say" on August 9, 1962, with an orchestra conducted by arranger Don Costa. It was produced by Ernie Altschuler and released as a single five months later, on January 4, 1963.

=== Chart performance ===
"What Will Mary Say" debuted on the Billboard Hot 100 in the issue of the magazine dated January 26, 1963, and peaked at number 9 six weeks later, in the March 9 issue. The song was on the Hot 100 for 12 weeks. It reached number 8 on Cash Box magazine's best seller list. In Billboard's February 2 issue, it made its first appearance on the magazine's Easy Listening chart, where it spent 11 weeks and got as high as number 3. It also spent three weeks on the magazine's R&B chart, during which time it peaked at number 21. In May of that year it reached number 3 in Hong Kong. On the UK Singles Chart it peaked at number 49.

The song ranked at number 65 on Billboard magazine's Top 100 singles of 1963.

=== Critical reception ===
In their review column, the editors of Cash Box magazine featured the single as their Pick of the Week, which was their equivalent to a letter grade of A for both "What Will Mary Say" and its B-side, "Quiet Girl". They described "What Will Mary Say" as "an item with much folkish appeal, and handled by Mathis and his full ork-chorus backdrop with an ambling, Nashville-flavored sound." The editors of Billboard categorized the single as a "Spotlight Pick", one of the strongest of the new releases, and wrote, "This lovely side could turn out to be Johnny's biggest hit in a long time. He sells the folksy ballad with feeling, aided nicely by choral and ork backing."

=== Charts ===
Weekly charts

Weekly chart performance for "What Will Mary Say"
Chart (1963)	Peak position
Hong Kong	3
UK Singles Chart	49
US Billboard Easy Listening	3
US Billboard Hot 100	9
US Billboard R&B Best Sellers	21
US Top 100 Best Selling Tunes on Records (Cash Box)	8

Year-end charts

Year-end chart performance for "What Will Mary Say"
Chart (1963)	Position
US Billboard Hot 100	65

== Other versions ==
Jay Black released a version of the song as a single in 1967 that reached number 19 on Cash Box magazine's Looking Ahead chart, which was described as a "compilation, in order of strength, of up and coming records showing signs of breaking into The Cash Box Top 100". In their review column, the editors of the magazine featured the single as their Pick of the Week and wrote, "'What Will Mary Say' should help the songster expand on an already widespread following gained as the Jay of Jay and the Americans."

== Bibliography ==
- Whitburn, Joel (2014), Joel Whitburn's Cash Box Pop Hits 1952-1996, Record Research Inc., ISBN 978-0-89820-209-0
