= I'll Never Be Lonely Again =

- US 7-inch single

Single by Johnny Mathis

from the album Johnny's Newest Hits
- A-side: "That's the Way It Is"
- Released: July 27, 1962
- Recorded: May 23, 1960
- Genre: Pop
- Length: 3:10
- Label: Columbia
- Songwriters: Sherman Edwards; Aaron Schroeder
- Producer: Mitch Miller

Johnny Mathis singles chronology
"Tonight" (1962)	"That's the Way It Is" / "I'll Never Be Lonely Again" (1962)	"Gina" (1962)

Music video
- "I'll Never Be Lonely Again" on YouTube

"I'll Never Be Lonely Again" is a popular song written by Sherman Edwards and Aaron Schroeder that was recorded by Johnny Mathis in 1960. It charted in 1962.

== Recording and release ==
Johnny Mathis recorded "I'll Never Be Lonely Again" on May 23, 1960, with an orchestra conducted by Ralph Burns. It was produced by Mitch Miller and released as a single two years later, on July 27, 1962.

== Chart performance ==
"I'll Never Be Lonely Again" reached number 35 on Cash Box magazine's Looking Ahead chart, which was described as a "compilation, in order of strength, of up and coming records showing signs of breaking into The Cash Box Top 100".

== Critical reception ==
In their review column, the editors of Cash Box magazine featured the single as their Pick of the Week, which was their equivalent to a letter grade of A for both "I'll Never Be Lonely Again" and its A-side, "That's the Way It Is". Combining their comments for both songs, they wrote, "Watch for both ends of the velvety-voiced performer to be filling the air-waves in no time flat. They’re two haunting ballads that Johnny wraps up in ultra-lovely fashion. One half, 'I'll Never Be Lonely Again', features a superb ork showcase from the Ralph Burns crew." They concluded, "Excellent two-sider." The editors of Billboard wrote, "Here's a soft, easy, lyrical ballad that's handled in touching Mathis style. The backing is composed of smart fem[ale] vocal chorus."

== Charts ==
Weekly chart performance for "I'll Never Be Lonely Again"
Chart (1962)	Peak position
US Looking Ahead (Cash Box)	35
