= Judson Pratt =

American actor (1916–2002)

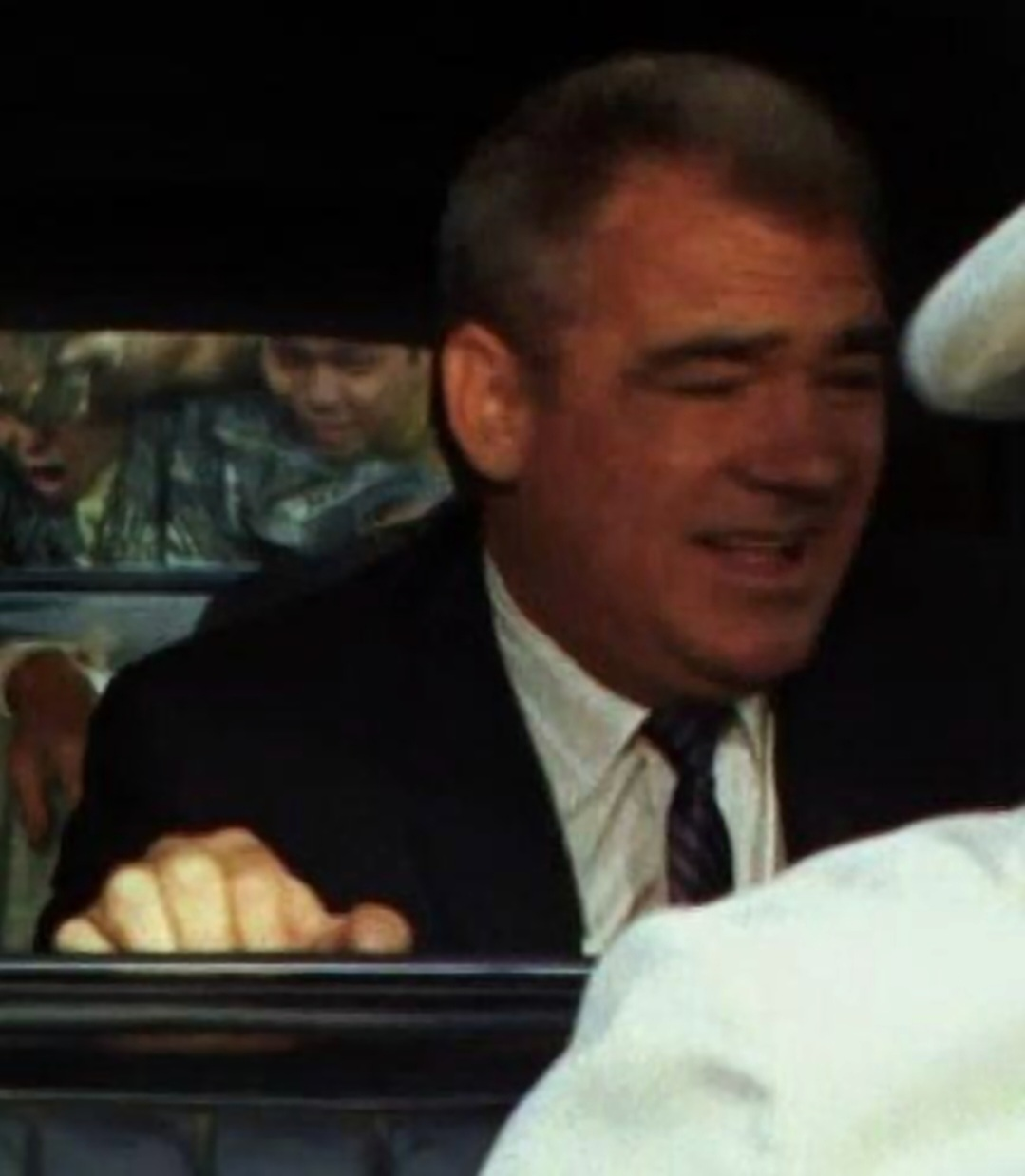
- Pratt in The Ugly American, 1963
- Born: December 6, 1916; Hingham, Massachusetts, U.S.
- Died: February 9, 2002 (aged 85); Northridge, California, U.S.
- Education: Ithaca College
- Occupation: Actor
- Years active: 1941–1980
- Spouse(s): Roberta Jonay (m. 1950; died 1976)

Judson Pratt (December 6, 1916 – February 9, 2002) was an American film, television, and theatre actor. He was best known for playing Sergeant Major Kirby in the 1959 film The Horse Soldiers.

== Early life and career ==
Pratt was born in Hingham, Massachusetts. He attended Hingham High School, graduating in 1934. He also attended Ithaca College, graduating in 1938. He began his stage career in 1941, playing a Western Union messenger in the Broadway play Popsy. He then began his screen career in 1950, in the anthology television series Armstrong Circle Theatre, starring opposite Mary Patton in the episode "Blaze of Glory". In 1953, he appeared in Alfred Hitchcock's film I Confess.

Later in his career, in 1958, Pratt starred as Billy Kinkaid in the syndicated western television series Union Pacific starring along with Jeff Morrow and Susan Cummings. After the series ended in 1959, he guest-starred in numerous television programs including Barney Miller, Gunsmoke, Bonanza, Alfred Hitchcock Presents, Father Knows Best, Thriller, Perry Mason, Death Valley Days, The Streets of San Francisco, Rawhide, Mayberry, R.F.D., Nanny and the Professor, Mission: Impossible, The Guns of Will Sonnett, The Partridge Family, Bewitched and Charlie's Angels. He also appeared in films such as The Horse Soldiers (as Sergeant Major Kirby), The Toy Tiger, Outside the Law, I Confess, Four Girls in Town, The Great American Pastime, Man Afraid, Vigilante Force, Somebody Up There Likes Me, Cheyenne Autumn, A Distant Trumpet, The Ugly American, The Wacky Zoo of Morgan City, and The Barefoot Executive.

Pratt retired from acting in 1980, last appearing in the NBC soap opera television series Days of Our Lives.

== Personal life and death ==
Pratt was married to actress Roberta Jonay from May 21, 1950 until her death on April 19, 1976. They had two children.

Pratt died on February 9, 2002 in Northridge, California, at the age of 85. His body was cremated.
