= So Far (Rodgers and Hammerstein song) =

Song
- Published: 1947
- Songwriter: Oscar Hammerstein II
- Composer: Richard Rodgers

"So Far" is a show tune from the 1947 Rodgers and Hammerstein musical Allegro when it was introduced by the character "Beulah" played by Gloria Wills.

On July 28, 1947 (see 1947 in music), the song was recorded by Perry Como, and released by RCA Victor Records as a 78 rpm single, catalog number 20-2402-A, with the flip side "A Fellow Needs a Girl". The song reached #11 on the Billboard charts.

Other versions were recorded by Frank Sinatra and by Margaret Whiting. Sinatra's version also charted in 1947 reaching the No. 8 position.

Dick Haymes included the song in his album Look at Me Now! (1957).

Tony Bennett later used the song on his album Long Ago and Far Away (1958).

The song was also used in the 1996 stage musical State Fair.
