= Riviera (song) =

Song composed by Cy Coleman

"The Riviera" is a song written and composed by Cy Coleman and Joseph Allen McCarthy in 1953. The song was intended for the John Murray Anderson's Almanac revue, but was instead picked up by cabaret singer Mabel Mercer and included in her album Songs by Mabel Mercer, Vol. 3 (1953). The version probably best known is that performed by Blossom Dearie on her album Give Him the Ooh-La-La (1958).

== Other versions ==
- Dick Haymes for his 1957 album Look at Me Now!
- Johnny Mathis for his album Live It Up! (1961)
- Tony Bennett – for his album With Love (1972)
