= Roberta Jonay =

American actress (1921–1976)

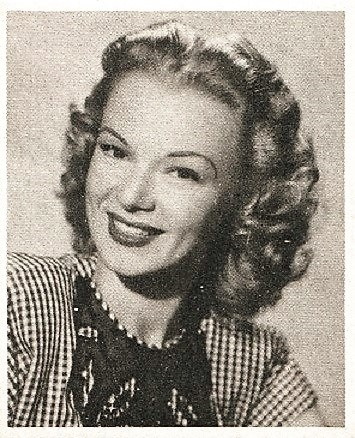
- Jonay in 1948
- Born: October 15, 1921; Philadelphia, Pennsylvania, U.S.
- Died: April 19, 1976 (aged 54); Tarzana, Los Angeles, California, U.S.
- Resting place: Forest Lawn Memorial Park, Hollywood Hills, California
- Occupation: Actress
- Years active: 1943–1957
- Spouse: Judson Pratt (m. 1950)
- Children: 3

Roberta Jonay (October 15, 1921 – April 19, 1976) was an American film actress, best known for her roles in Suddenly, It's Spring (1947) and The Emperor Waltz (1948). She created the role of 'Jennie' in Rodgers and Hammerstein's 'Allegro' on Broadway in 1947.

== Personal life and death ==
Jonay married actor Judson Pratt in 1950, they had three children together. She died in 1976 at the age of 54 from cancer in Tarzana, California, and was buried in Forest Lawn Memorial Park, Hollywood Hills, California.

== Selected filmography ==
- Riding High (1943) - Dancer (uncredited)
- Here Come the Waves (1944) - Wave (uncredited)
- Duffy's Tavern (1945) - Telephone Operator (uncredited)
- Masquerade in Mexico (1945) - Party Guest (uncredited)
- The Stork Club (1945) - Newspaper Flirt (uncredited)
- Miss Susie Slagle's (1946) - Dora (uncredited)
- The Blue Dahlia (1946) - Hotel Clerk (uncredited)
- The Well Groomed Bride (1946) - Wave (uncredited)
- O.S.S. (1946) - Gracie Archer (uncredited)
- Blue Skies (1946) - Hatcheck Girl (uncredited)
- The Imperfect Lady (1947) - Ballet Dancer (uncredited)
- The Imperfect Lady (1947) - Ballet Dancer (uncredited)
- Ladies' Man (1947) - Miss Miller, Telephone Operator
- Suddenly, It's Spring (1947) - Wac Sergeant
- Golden Earrings (1947) - Farmer's Daughter (uncredited)
- Golden Earrings (1947) - Farmer's Daughter (uncredited)
- Variety Girl (1947) - Girl #2 (uncredited)
- The Emperor Waltz (1948) - Chambermaid
- Kraft Television Theatre (1948) - Jeanette Brewster (1 episode)
- Whispering Smith (1948) - Girl (uncredited)
- The Chevrolet Tele-Theatre (1950) - (1 episode)
- Schlitz Playhouse of Stars (1957) - Morgan's sister (1 episode)
