= I Only Have Eyes for You (Johnny Mathis album) =

Studio album by Johnny Mathis
- Released: May 10, 1976
- Recorded: June 16, 1975; January 20–21, 1976; February 23–March 5, 1976; March 12, 1976
- Studio: A&M (Hollywood)
- Genre: Traditional pop; vocal pop
- Length: 37:17
- Label: Columbia
- Producer: Jack Gold

Johnny Mathis chronology
Feelings (1975)	I Only Have Eyes for You (1976)	The Johnny Mathis Collection (1976)

Professional ratings
Review scores
Source	Rating
Allmusic	3/5 stars
The Encyclopedia of Popular Music	3/5 stars

I Only Have Eyes for You is an album by American pop singer Johnny Mathis that was released on May 10, 1976, by Columbia Records and included two new songs, "Yellow Roses on Her Gown" and "Ooh What We Do", which was written specifically for him, as well as a contemporary arrangement of the 1934 title track that foreshadowed his recordings of standards that incorporated a disco beat ("Begin the Beguine", "Night and Day") a few years later.

The album made its first appearance on Billboard magazine's Top LP's & Tapes chart in the issue dated June 26, 1976, and remained there for 15 weeks, peaking at number 79. The following month, on July 3, it made its first appearance on the UK album chart, where it reached number 14 during a 12-week run. On December 1, 1976, the British Phonographic Industry awarded the album with Silver certification for sales of 60,000 units, and Gold certification for 100,000 units followed on April 15, 1977.

The first song from the album to reach the US charts, "Yellow Roses on Her Gown", entered Billboard's list of the 50 most popular Easy Listening songs in the issue of the magazine dated July 24, 1976, and peaked at number 44 over the course of three weeks. A second song, "Do Me Wrong, but Do Me", entered that same chart in the October 2, 1976, issue, eventually getting as high as number 25 during its nine weeks there. The only song to reach the UK charts, "When a Child Is Born", began a 12-week stay there the following month, on November 13, during which time it enjoyed three weeks at number one.

== Reception ==
Joe Viglione of AllMusic wrote retrospectively: "'Every Time You Touch Me (I Get High)'" has a dazzling arrangement, and moments like this make the covers worthwhile." But he was most impressed with "Ooh What We Do", concluding that "it is the new song he discovered here that brings magic to this collection."

== Track listing ==
=== Side one ===
1. "I Write the Songs" (Bruce Johnston) – 3:57
2. "Do Me Wrong, but Do Me" (Alan O'Day) – 3:17
3. "The Hungry Years" (Howard Greenfield, Neil Sedaka) – 4:35
4. "I Only Have Eyes for You" from Dames (Al Dubin, Harry Warren) – 3:33
5. "Yellow Roses on Her Gown" (Michael Moore) – 4:33

=== Side two ===
1. "(Do You Know Where You're Going To) Theme from Mahogany" from Mahogany (Gerry Goffin, Michael Masser) – 3:47
2. "Ooh What We Do" (Harriet Schock) – 3:25
3. "Send in the Clowns" from A Little Night Music (Stephen Sondheim) – 3:35
4. "Every Time You Touch Me (I Get High)" (Charlie Rich, Billy Sherrill) – 2:52
5. "When a Child Is Born" (Ciro Dammicco, Fred Jay) – 3:41

== Recording dates ==
From the liner notes for The Voice of Romance: The Columbia Original Album Collection:

- June 16, 1975 – "Every Time You Touch Me (I Get High)"
- January 20, 1976 – "The Hungry Years", "I Write the Songs", "Send in the Clowns"
- January 21, 1976 – "I Only Have Eyes for You"
- February 23, 1976 – "Do Me Wrong, but Do Me", "(Do You Know Where You're Going To) Theme from Mahogany", "Yellow Roses on Her Gown"
- February 23–March 5, 1976 – "When a Child Is Born"
- March 12, 1976 – "Ooh What We Do"

== Song information ==
Barry Manilow's recording of "I Write the Songs" spent a week at number one on the Billboard Hot 100 and two weeks at number one on the magazine's Easy Listening chart. It also earned the Grammy Award for Song of the Year and Gold certification from the Recording Industry Association of America. By the time this album was released, "Do Me Wrong, but Do Me" had already been recorded by Mel Carter and Jack Jones. "The Hungry Years" was the title track from Neil Sedaka's 1975 album. And the highest-charting version of "I Only Have Eyes for You" was a number two hit for Ben Selvin & His Orchestra with Howard Phillips on vocal in 1934.

"(Do You Know Where You're Going To) Theme from Mahogany" by Diana Ross enjoyed a week at number one on both the Hot 100 and Easy Listening charts in addition to reaching number 14 R&B and number five on the UK singles chart. "Send in the Clowns" originated in the 1973 Broadway musical A Little Night Music and won the Grammy Award for Song of the Year. The hit version of the song by Judy Collins first peaked at number 36 pop, number eight Easy Listening, and number six in the UK upon its initial release in 1975, and the reissue of her recording in 1977 that coincided with the release of the film version of the musical in the US made it to number 19 pop and number 15 Easy Listening. "Every Time You Touch Me (I Get High)" by Charlie Rich had a week at number one on the Easy Listening chart and got as high as number 19 on the Hot 100 and number three on Billboard's Country chart. And Michael Holm's recording of "When a Child Is Born" made it to number 53 pop and number seven Easy Listening upon its release at the end of 1974.

== Personnel ==
From the liner notes for the original album:

- Johnny Mathis – vocals
- Jack Gold – producer
- Gene Page – arranger, conductor
- Dick Bogert – engineer
- Sam Emerson – photography

== Bibliography ==
- O'Neil, Thomas (1999), The Grammys, Perigree Books, ISBN 0399524770
- Whitburn, Joel (1986), Joel Whitburn's Pop Memories, 1890-1954, Record Research Inc., ISBN 0898200830
- Whitburn, Joel (2002), Joel Whitburn's Top Country Singles, 1944-2001, Record Research Inc., ISBN 0-89820-151-9
- Whitburn, Joel (2004), Joel Whitburn Presents Top R&B/Hip-Hop Singles, 1942-2004, Record Research Inc., ISBN 0-89820-160-8
- Whitburn, Joel (2007), Joel Whitburn Presents Billboard Top Adult Songs, 1961-2006, Record Research Inc., ISBN 978-0898201697
- Whitburn, Joel (2009), Joel Whitburn's Top Pop Singles, 1955-2008, Record Research Inc., ISBN 978-0-89820-180-2
- Whitburn, Joel (2010), Joel Whitburn Presents Top Pop Albums, Seventh Edition, Record Research Inc., ISBN 978-0-89820-183-3
