= All Is Well (song) =

- US 7-inch single

Single by Johnny Mathis

from the album Portrait of Johnny
- A-side: "Starbright"
- Released: February 15, 1960
- Recorded: May 1, 1959
- Genre: Pop
- Length: 2:33
- Label: Columbia
- Songwriters: Jerry Leiber; Mike Stoller
- Producer: Al Ham

Johnny Mathis singles chronology
"The Best of Everything" (1959)	"Starbright" / "All Is Well" (1960)	"Maria" (1960)

Music video
- "All Is Well" on YouTube

"All Is Well" is a popular song written by Jerry Leiber and Mike Stoller. It was recorded by Johnny Mathis in 1959 and charted in 1960.

== Recording and release ==
Johnny Mathis recorded "All Is Well" on May 1, 1959, with an orchestra conducted by Glenn Osser. It was produced by Al Ham and released as a single nine months later, on February 15, 1960.

== Chart performance ==
"All Is Well" reached number 6 on Cash Box magazine's Looking Ahead chart, which was described as a "compilation, in order of strength, of up and coming records showing signs of breaking into The Cash Box Top 100".

== Critical reception ==
In their review column, the editors of Cash Box magazine featured the single as their Pick of the Week, which was their equivalent to a letter grade of A for both "All Is Well" and its A-side, "Starbright". They described "All Is Well" as "the town crier's message transformed into a classic love swinger." They also wrote, "Glenn Osser's ork and choral support matches Mathis's superb performances on both lids." The editors of Billboard categorized the single as a "Spotlight Winner", one of the best of the week's new releases, and wrote that "All Is Well" was "a medium beater that is smartly handled." They added, "Mathis is backed effectively on both sides."

== Charts ==
Weekly chart performance for "All Is Well"
Chart (1960)	Peak position
US Looking Ahead (Cash Box)	6
