= Starbright (song) =

- US 7-inch single

Single by Johnny Mathis

from the album Portrait of Johnny
- B-side: "All Is Well"
- Released: February 15, 1960
- Recorded: April 29, 1959
- Genre: Pop
- Length: 2:52
- Label: Columbia
- Songwriters: Lee Pockriss; Paul Vance
- Producer: Al Ham

Johnny Mathis singles chronology
"The Best of Everything" (1959)	"Starbright" / "All Is Well" (1960)	"Maria" (1960)

Music video
- "Starbright" on YouTube

"Starbright" is a popular song written by Lee Pockriss and Paul Vance. It was recorded by Johnny Mathis in 1959 and charted in 1960.

== Recording and release ==
Johnny Mathis recorded "Starbright" on April 29, 1959, with an orchestra conducted by Glenn Osser. It was produced by Al Ham and released as a single on February 15, 1960.

== Chart performance ==
"Starbright" debuted on the Billboard Hot 100 in the issue of the magazine dated February 29, 1960, and peaked at number 25 five weeks later, in the April 4 issue. The song stayed on the chart for 11 weeks. It reached number 24 on Cash Box magazine's best seller list. On the UK Singles Chart it peaked at number 47.

== Critical reception ==
In their review column, the editors of Cash Box magazine featured the single as their Pick of the Week, which was their equivalent to a letter grade of A for both "Starbright" and its B-side, "All Is Well". They described "Starbright" as "an ultra-lovely romancer set to a soft, ear-arresting cha cha beat." They also wrote, "Glenn Osser's ork and choral support matches Mathis's superb performances on both lids." The editors of Billboard categorized the single as a "Spotlight Winner", one of the best of the week's new releases, and wrote that "Starbright" was "a lovely beguine, a bit on the slow side, and it's accorded a warm rendition." They added, "Mathis is backed effectively on both sides."

== Charts ==
Weekly chart performance for "Starbright"
Chart (1960)	Peak position
UK Singles Chart	47
US Billboard Hot 100	25
US Top 100 Best Selling Tunes on Records (Cash Box)	24

== Bibliography ==
- Whitburn, Joel (2014), Joel Whitburn's Cash Box Pop Hits 1952-1996, Record Research Inc., ISBN 978-0-89820-209-0
