= Let's Face It! =

1941 Cole Porter musical

- Music: Cole Porter
- Lyrics: Cole Porter
- Book: Herbert and Dorothy Fields
- Basis: The play The Cradle Snatchers by Russell Medcraft and Norma Mitchell
- Productions: 1941 Broadway; 1942 West End

Let's Face It! is a musical with music and lyrics by Cole Porter. The book by Herbert and Dorothy Fields is based on the 1925 play The Cradle Snatchers by Russell Medcraft and Norma Mitchell.

The 1941 Broadway and 1942 West End productions were successful, and a film version was released in 1943.

== Plot ==
Three suspicious wives, Maggie Watson, Nancy Collister and Cornelia Pigeon, invite three Army inductees to Maggie's summer house in Southampton on Long Island in order to make their husbands jealous. Jerry Walker is engaged to Winnie Potter, and, because he needs the money, agrees to the plot. The wives' philandering husbands leave on yet another camping trip. Winnie, hearing of Jerry's involvement, brings in two friends (who are actually girlfriends of the other two soldiers) to pretend to be interested in the older men. The husbands actually do go fishing. Winnie and her friends crash Maggie's party and the husbands unexpectedly return home.

== Song list ==
Act I

- "Milk, Milk, Milk" – Ensemble
- "A Lady Needs a Rest" – Maggie, Nancy, Cornelia
- "Jerry, My Soldier Boy" – Winnie
- "Let's Face It" – The Royal Guards
- "Farming" – Jerry, Frankie, Eddie, Muriel, Jean, Ensemble
- "Ev'rything I Love" – Jerry and Winnie
- "Ace in the Hole" – Winnie, Muriel, Jean, Ensemble
- "You Irritate Me So" – Jean and Eddie
- "Baby Games" – Jerry, Maggie, Frankie, Cornelia, Nancy, Eddie
- "A Fairy Tale" – Jerry
- "Rub Your Lamp" – Winnie

Act II

- "I've Got Some Unfinished Business with You" – Winnie, Jean, Muriel, Dorothy, Gloria, Julian, Judge Pigeon
- "Let's Not Talk About Love" – Jerry
- "Let's Talk About Love" – Maggie
- "A Little Rumba Numba" – The Royal Guards, Madge, Mary, Billy
- "I Hate You, Darling" – Nancy, George, Jerry, Maggie
- "Melody in Four F" – Jerry
- "Get Yourself a Girl" – The Royal Guards

"A Fairy Tale" and "Melody in Four F" were written by Sylvia Fine and Max Liebman. Both were dropped later in the run, and "Melody in Four F" was replaced by "It Ain't Etiquette" from Du Barry Was a Lady.

== Productions ==
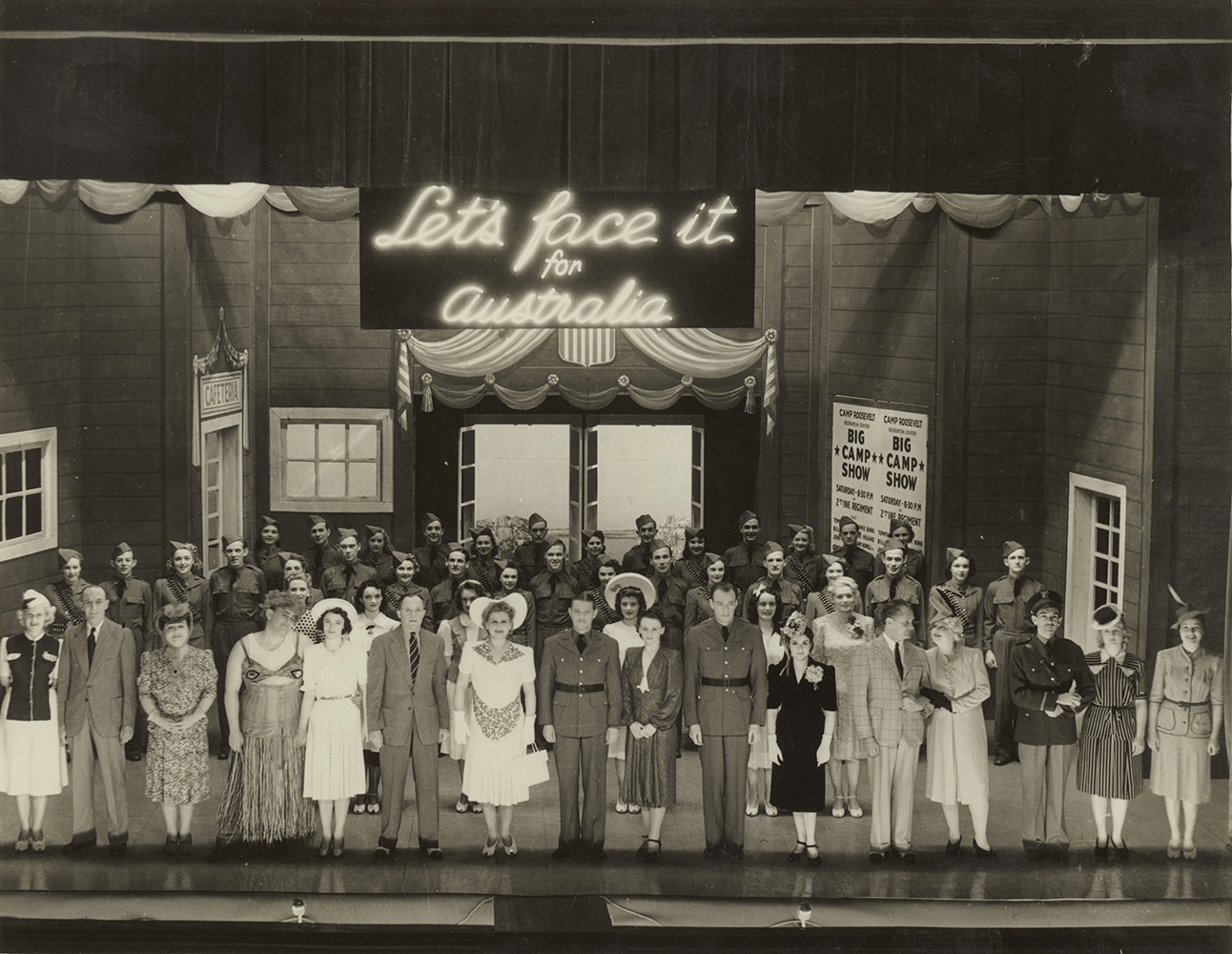
Cast of Cole Porter's Musical Let’s Face It! on Stage, Melbourne, 1943

The original production was directed by Edgar MacGregor and choreographed by Charles Walters. After a tryout at the Colonial Theatre in Boston, the musical opened on Broadway at the Imperial Theatre on October 29, 1941, and closed on March 20, 1943, after 547 performances. The cast included Danny Kaye as Jerry Walker, Eve Arden as Maggie Watson, Edith Meiser as Cornelia Abigail Pigeon, Vivian Vance as Nancy Collister, Benny Baker, Mary Jane Walsh as Winnie Potter, and Nanette Fabray. The cast also featured a then unknown Carol Channing as Eve Arden's understudy. Danny Kaye had made his successful debut earlier in the year in Lady in the Dark, and Porter allowed the actor's wife, Sylvia Fine, to add two comedy numbers into the score for him to sing. Later in the run, Carol Goodner replaced Eve Arden and José Ferrer replaced Kaye.

Tryouts in the UK began on June 23, 1942, at the Palace Theatre in Manchester, England. The West End production opened on November 19, 1942, at the Hippodrome Theatre and ran for 348 performances. It was directed by Bobby Howell and choreographed by Joan Davis. The cast included Bobby Howes as Jerry Walker and Pat Kirkwood as Winnie Potter.

An Australian production played from November 1943 to January 1944 at His Majesty's Theatre in Melbourne.

42nd Street Moon in San Francisco, California, presented a staged concert version of the show in October 1999. Musicals Tonight!, New York City, presented a staged concert version in May 2006.

== Film and television versions ==
A 1943 screen adaptation featured Bob Hope and Betty Hutton. Although the plot remained the same, most of the Porter score was replaced by songs by other composers.

A made-for-television live broadcast of the show was presented on the NBC television network on November 21, 1954 on The Colgate Comedy Hour, with Bert Lahr as Frankie Burns / Aunt Pamela Burns, Vivian Blaine as Winnie Potter, Gene Nelson as Jerry Walker, and Betty Furness as Maggie Watson.

== Response ==
Stephen Citron wrote in 2005: "No one ever has ever called Let's Face It a great musical. Nor did anyone expect it to be the smash hit that it was, least of all its producer. Freedley was not deceived into complacency when in The New Yorker Wolcott Gibbs called it 'brilliant foolishness', or Life Magazine dubbed it the season's 'smash' and declared, 'Porter has come out of his slump.' He knew it was the stars, especially Danny Kaye's brilliant double-talk routines, and the wartime escape atmosphere that filled the theatre nightly."
