= Jenny (Johnny Mathis song) =

- US 7-inch single

Single by Johnny Mathis

from the album Portrait of Johnny
- A-side: "You Set My Heart to Music"
- Released: March 20, 1961
- Recorded: February 8, 1961
- Genre: Pop
- Length: 2:58
- Label: Columbia
- Songwriters: Jack Segal; Paul Vance
- Producer: Irving Townsend

Johnny Mathis singles chronology
"How to Handle a Woman" (1960)	"You Set My Heart to Music" / "Jenny" (1961)	"Laurie, My Love" (1961)

Music video
- "Jenny" on YouTube

"Jenny" is a popular song written by Jack Segal and Paul Vance that was recorded by Johnny Mathis in 1961. It charted that same year.

== Recording and release ==
Johnny Mathis recorded "Jenny" on February 8, 1961, with an orchestra conducted by Ray Ellis. It was produced by Irving Townsend and released as a single six weeks later, on March 20, 1961.

== Chart performance ==
"Jenny" "bubbled under" Billboard magazine's Hot 100 for one week at number 118 in the issue dated April 10, 1961. On Cash Box magazine's best seller list, "Jenny" was paired with its B-side, "You Set My Heart to Music", on the Looking Ahead chart, which was described as a "compilation, in order of strength, of up and coming records showing signs of breaking into The Cash Box Top 100". They peaked there at number 20.

== Critical reception ==
In their review column, the editors of Cash Box magazine featured the single as their Pick of the Week, which was their equivalent to a letter grade of A for both songs. They described "Jenny" as "very pretty". The editors of Billboard categorized the single as a "Spotlight Winner", one of the best of the week's new releases, and, regarding "Jenny", wrote, "An attractive tune is handed an expressive vocal interpretation by Mathis with haunting backing."

== Charts ==
Weekly chart performance for "Jenny"
Chart (1961)	Peak position
US Bubbling Under the Hot 100 (Billboard)	118
US Looking Ahead (Cash Box)	20

== Sources ==
- Whitburn, Joel (2009), Joel Whitburn's Top Pop Singles, 1955-2008, Record Research Inc., ISBN 0898201802
