= Maria (West Side Story song) =

Song from the 1957 musical West Side Story

Song
- Published: 1956
- Genre: popular song/operatic recitative and aria
- Composer: Leonard Bernstein
- Lyricist: Stephen Sondheim

"Maria" is a song from the 1957 Broadway musical West Side Story, sung by the lead character Tony. The music was written by Leonard Bernstein and lyrics by Stephen Sondheim. The song was published in 1956. Recordings by Johnny Mathis and Roger Williams made the record charts in the early 1960s.

== In West Side Story ==
"Maria" is sung by the male lead Tony when he learns the name of the girl he has fallen in love with at the dance in act 1, and who has been pulled away from him by her protective brother Bernardo, is "Maria". The name "Maria" is spoken or sung in the song 30 times. The musical motif is announced frequently in the latter part of the preceding dance scene and is continued in the introduction of the following balcony scene. The song was originally composed in E-flat major (following an 8-bar introduction in B major).

After Tony speaks her name once, the song opens with a recitative ("The most beautiful sound I ever heard") of eight bars which repeats her name ten times, before an aria begins after a key and tempo change. The tessitura of the aria rises slowly from the initial B^{2}–G♯^{3} culminating in a B♭^{4} (with an ossia on G^{4}). The aria ends on a sustained G^{4}.

The song is widely known for its use of the melodic interval of a tritone in the main theme. This is also a major motif throughout the other songs in the musical. The song is an example of the use of Lydian mode, which is the same as the major scale but with an augmented fourth.

== Uses ==
Bernstein used "Maria" for his 1992 Concert Suite No. 1 from West Side Story.

Lin-Manuel Miranda used a line from its text and that line's melody for the 2017 song "Almost Like Praying" to support relief efforts in Puerto Rico in response to Hurricane Maria.

"Maria"
- US 7-inch single

Single by Johnny Mathis

from the album Faithfully
- B-side: "Hey Love"
- Released: May 9, 1960
- Recorded: November 6, 1959
- Genre: Pop
- Length: 3:50
- Label: Columbia
- Songwriters: Leonard Bernstein; Stephen Sondheim
- Producer: Mitch Miller

Johnny Mathis singles chronology
"Starbright" / "All Is Well" (1960)	"Maria" (1960)	"My Love for You" (1960)

Music video
- "Maria" on YouTube

== Johnny Mathis version ==
Johnny Mathis recorded "Maria" on November 6, 1959, with an orchestra conducted by Glenn Osser. It was produced by Mitch Miller and released as a single on May 9, 1960, which coincided with the Broadway revival of West Side Story that opened on April 27.

=== Chart performance ===
"Maria" debuted on the Billboard Hot 100 in the issue of the magazine dated May 30, 1960, and peaked at number 78 six weeks later, in the July 11 issue. It reached number 50 on Cash Box magazine's best seller list. After the musical film adaptation was released in October 1961, the Mathis recording was reissued and had its second debut in the Billboard issue dated December 11. It peaked at number 88 during the three additional weeks it spent there.

=== Critical reception ===
In their review column, the editors of Cash Box magazine featured the single as their Pick of the Week, which was their equivalent to a letter grade of A for both "Maria" and its B-side, "Hey Love". They described "Maria" as "a distinctive reading of the beautiful opus." They also wrote, "A lovely tango setting from the string ork." The editors of Billboard categorized the single as a "Spotlight Winner", one of the best of the week's new releases, and wrote that "Maria" was "a pretty ballad." AllMusic's Stephen Thomas Erlewine included the song on a list of "heavy-hitters" on Mathis's 1998 compilation The Ultimate Hits Collection. In June 2026, CBS News included the song in its list of the 250 essential American songs of the past 250 years.

=== Charts ===
Weekly chart performance for "Maria" by Johnny Mathis
Chart (1960)	Peak position
US Billboard Hot 100	78
US Top 100 Best Selling Tunes on Records (Cash Box)	50
Chart (1961)	Peak position
US Billboard Hot 100 (Billboard)	88

"Maria"
- US 7-inch single

Single by Roger Williams

from the album Maria
- Released: 1961
- Recorded: 1961
- Genre: Pop
- Length: 2:50
- Label: Kapp
- Songwriters: Leonard Bernstein; Stephen Sondheim

Roger Williams singles chronology
"Clair De Lune (Moonlight Love)" (1961)	"Maria" (1961)	"Santa Claus-Santa Claus (We Love You Next to Our Pas and Mas)" (1961)

Music video
- "Maria" on YouTube

== Roger Williams version ==
"Maria" was chosen as the title track for a 1962 album by pianist Roger Williams and released as a single. The orchestra was conducted by Ralph Carmichael. It reached number 48 on the Billboard Hot 100 in January 1962 and number 11 on the magazine's Easy Listening chart. It also got as high as number 40 on Cash Box magazine's best seller list.

=== Critical reception ===
The editors of Billboard called it "delightful" when the original album was released, and in their review of his 1967 Golden Hits compilation, they described it as "powerful". The editors of Cash Box magazine called it one of the "better tracks" on Golden Hits.

=== Charts ===
Weekly chart performance for "Maria" by Roger Williams
Chart (1962)	Peak position
US Billboard Easy Listening	11
US Billboard Hot 100	48
US Top 100 Best Selling Tunes on Records (Cash Box)	40

== Notable cover versions ==
Various versions of "Maria" have been praised by the editors of Cash Box magazine in reviews of the albums or singles on which they appear. They described the song as "brilliant" in their review of the 1960 album West Side Story by André Previn and his trio. They found the performance by The Dave Brubeck Quartet on 1960's Bernstein Plays Brubeck Plays Bernstein to be "exemplary". In reviewing Presenting Peter Duchin, His Piano and Orchestra in 1961, they wrote, "Sounding a little like his famous father, Peter does credit to the Duchin name" on a list of songs that included "Maria". In reviewing Peter Nero's 1961 single that included the song, they described it as "the oft-cut ballad beaut" and praised "Nero's superb keyboard stylings". They also wrote, "Outstanding ork showcase supplied by Marty Gold's outfit." David Whitfield also released a single including the song in 1961, on which they said he gave a "wonderfully rich, big-voiced performance".

Cash Box commented on recordings of "Maria" from several 1962 albums. The editors chose an instrumental of the song as one of the "highlights" on Percy Faith's Hollywood's Great Themes. Jazz trumpeter Maynard Ferguson's Maynard '62 album included an instrumental version that they included in a list of songs that qualified as "top-flight free-flowing jazz". They wrote that pianist Junior Mance took "a new approach" to the song for The Soul of Hollywood. They described Perry Como's version on By Request as "superb". In reviewing Bobby Rydell's An Era Reborn, they included the song on a list of those on which he performs "with all of his expected artistry and verve". It was also on their list of songs with "top-flight arrangements" from Si Zentner and His Orchestra Play Desafinado. In the review of Lalo Schifrin's 1963 LP Piano, Strings and Bossa Nova, the rendition is described as a "feelingful performance". Operatic tenor Jan Peerce recorded "a strong big-ballad rendition" for a 1963 single that the editors summarized as "[c]lass warbling". Regarding Adam Wade's 1963 album A Very Good Year for Girls, they wrote, "The songster exhibits a polished style and a silky delivery that serves him well as he essays 'Maria'." They said that Vic Damone gave his 1964 single release a "warm and feelingful delivery" and described the rendition as a "powerful treatment" in reviewing its parent album, On the Street Where You Live.

Billboard also highlighted recordings of "Maria" in various reviews. Regarding the 1960 album Marian McPartland Plays Music of Leonard Bernstein, the editors wrote, "Miss McPartland here puts a selection of these into her own eloquent form of improved expression. The tunes, like … 'Maria' … seem especially suited to this interesting treatment." They described Cal Tjader's version on his 1960 album West Side Story as a "fine example" of the string arrangements by Clare Fischer. In their review of Como's By Request, they called the song a "favorite". They also called it one of "the better offerings" on Richard Maltby's 1962 album Ballads and Blues. George Chakiris recorded the song for a single in 1962, which the editors felt was "done with lots of verve over bright jazz support from Milton Raskin's crew." In their review of Schifrin's Piano, Strings and Bossa Nova, they wrote, "Lalo's jazz work with Gillespie shows through in some freewheeling piano passages in … 'Maria'." They also included it in a list of the "standout songs" on Damone's On the Street Where You Live.

AllMusic critics have commented in retrospective and contemporary reviews on various versions of the song. William Ruhlmann categorized "Maria" as one of the "important" songs in West Side Story in his review of the soundtrack to the 1961 film. He also described the song as "quality material" in his review of Como's By Request. Al Campbell included it on a list of several songs that "hold up exceptionally well" on Faith's 1962 album Hollywood's Great Themes. Scott Yanow found Sarah Vaughan's performance on her 1962 album You're Mine You to be "excessive", noting that "some may find her slightly overblown version of 'Maria' a bit difficult to sit through." Joe Viglione described the medley of "Maria" and "Somewhere" on Bryan Hyland's self-titled 1970 album as "memorable". Jon O'Brien reviewed Paul Potts's 2010 album Cinema Paradiso and commented, "Potts's populist style might not convince classical purists, but it's undoubtedly well suited to these operatic interpretations of classic movie songs including … 'Maria'."

== Bibliography ==
- Whitburn, Joel (2009), Joel Whitburn's Top Pop Singles, 1955-2008, Record Research Inc., ISBN 0898201802
- Whitburn, Joel (2014), Joel Whitburn's Cash Box Pop Hits 1952-1996, Record Research Inc., ISBN 978-0-89820-209-0
