= How to Handle a Woman =

- US 7-inch single

Single by Johnny Mathis

from the album Portrait of Johnny
- B-side: "While You're Young"
- Released: November 7, 1960
- Recorded: October 27, 1960
- Genre: Pop
- Length: 3:03
- Label: Columbia
- Songwriters: Frederick Loewe; Alan Jay Lerner
- Producer: Mitch Miller

Johnny Mathis singles chronology
"My Love for You" (1960)	"How to Handle a Woman" (1960)	"You Set My Heart to Music" / "Jenny" (1961)

Music video
- "How to Handle a Woman" on YouTube

"How to Handle a Woman" is a popular song composed by Frederick Loewe with lyrics by Alan Jay Lerner that was written for the 1960 Broadway musical Camelot. A recording of the song by Johnny Mathis charted that same year.

== Composition ==
In his autobiography, The Street Where I Live, the song's lyricist, Alan Jay Lerner, wrote that the inspiration for "How to Handle a Woman" came from a story told to him by novelist Erich Maria Remarque, who was married to actress Paulette Goddard, after Lerner jokingly asked him how he got along with such a "wild" woman. Remarque explained that any time Goddard became angry, he simply showered her with compliments, which soothed her instantly. Lerner told him he planned to write a song about it one day.

The story suggests that the solution to a conflict with a woman is to flatter her, but Lerner penned the lyrics, "The way to handle a woman is to love her, merely love her, love her, love her." Theater critic Peter Filichia scoffed at the choice of words, writing, "That from Lerner, who would marry no fewer than eight times."

== In Camelot ==
"How to Handle a Woman" is performed in the musical by King Arthur as he vents his frustration in understanding his wife, Guenevere. In his book Musical Comedy in America, Glenn Litton wrote of how the song provided one of the musical's better moments in the original production with Richard Burton as Arthur:

Frederick Loewe's melodies and Lerner's lyrics had charm, but their sentiment was out of focus, as if, after opening the scene, the authors had lost their fix on Camelot. Their talky songs for King Arthur diverted attention from Burton's limited vocal range, faulty intonation, and sandpaper timbre—with one exception, "How to Handle a Woman" … For once Burton had to stop jabbering and really sing. If his vocal quality was any clue to the state of his heart, Arthur's was broken.

Performing arts author Thomas Hischak wrote that "How to Handle a Woman" "seems too simpleminded for a character as complex as Arthur." Musicology professor Raymond Knapp described the song as "ruefully inadequate". In his book The American Musical and the Performance of Personal Identity, he wrote:

Arthur's "How to Handle a Woman" explores the awkwardness that entails when chivalry's ideal image of womankind bumps up against the realities of a living, feeling, and especially thinking woman (an awkwardness that extends to the song's broad chauvinism bumping up against an emergent feminism in the early 1960s).

Playwright Grace Barnes pointed out the sexist overtones in the song, writing, "A man has to learn how to 'handle' a woman, the implication being he knows how to interact with a man."

== Johnny Mathis recording and release ==
Johnny Mathis recorded "How to Handle a Woman" on October 27, 1960, with an orchestra conducted by Percy Faith. It was produced by Mitch Miller and released as a single 11 days later, on November 7.

== Chart performance ==
"How to Handle a Woman" debuted on the Billboard Hot 100 in the issue of the magazine dated December 26, 1960, and peaked at number 64 in the following issue for January 2, 1961. The song stayed on the Hot 100 for three weeks. It reached number 83 on Cash Box magazine's best seller list.

== Critical reception ==
In their review column, the editors of Cash Box featured the single as their Pick of the Week, which was their equivalent to a letter grade of A for both "How to Handle a Woman" and its B-side, "While You're Young". They wrote, "The smooth Mathis touch is heard on both ends," and described "How to Handle a Woman" as "a lovely Lerner-Loewe (My Fair Lady) item from their upcoming musical, Camelot". The editors of Billboard categorized the single as a "Spotlight Winner", one of the best of the week's new releases, and wrote, "Mathis has two warm, lush ballad stylings here. First up is a lovely song from Camelot, new Lerner-Loewe [musical] opening soon in New York."

== Charts ==
Weekly chart performance for "How to Handle a Woman"
Chart (1960–1961)	Peak position
US Billboard Hot 100	64
US Top 100 Best Selling Tunes on Records (Cash Box)	83

== Bibliography ==
- Barnes, Grace (2015), Her Turn on Stage, McFarland Inc., ISBN 9781476620459
- Citron, Stephen (1997), The Musical from the Inside Out, Ivan R. Dee, ISBN 9781461720966
- Filichia, Peter (2010), Broadway Musicals: The Biggest Hit & the Biggest Flop of the Season, 1959 to 2009, Bloomsbury Academic, ISBN 9781423495628
- Hischak, Thomas S. (1991), Word Crazy: Broadway lyricists from Cohan to Sondheim, Bloomsbury Academic, ISBN 9780275938499
- Knapp, Raymond (2010), The American Musical and the Performance of Personal Identity, Princeton University Press, ISBN 9781400832682
- Knapp, Raymond (2019), "Chapter 3: Getting Real: Stage Musical versus Filmic Realism in Film Adaptations from Camelot to Cabaret", in McHugh, Dominic (ed.), The Oxford Handbook of Musical Theatre Screen Adaptations, Oxford University Press, ISBN 9780190490003
- Lerner, Alan Jay (1994) [1985], The Street Where I Live, Da Capo Press, ISBN 978-0-3068-0602-5
- Smith, Cecil A.; Litton, Glenn (2013), Musical Comedy in America, Taylor & Francis, ISBN 9781136556685
- Whitburn, Joel (2014), Joel Whitburn's Cash Box Pop Hits 1952-1996, Record Research Inc., ISBN 978-0-89820-209-0
