= Wasn't the Summer Short? =

- US 7-inch single

Single by Johnny Mathis

from the album Johnny's Newest Hits
- B-side: "There You Are"
- Released: September 8, 1961
- Recorded: February 8, 1961
- Genre: Pop
- Length: 2:56
- Label: Columbia
- Songwriter: Ruth Lyons
- Producer: Irving Townsend

Johnny Mathis singles chronology
"Laurie, My Love" (1961)	"Wasn't the Summer Short?" / "There You Are" (1961)	"Sweet Thursday" (1961)

Music video
- "Wasn't the Summer Short?" on YouTube

"Wasn't the Summer Short?" is a popular song written by Ruth Lyons that was recorded by Johnny Mathis in 1961. It charted that same year.

== Recording and release ==
Johnny Mathis recorded "Wasn't the Summer Short?" on February 8, 1961, with an orchestra conducted by Ray Ellis. It was produced by Irving Townsend and released as a single seven months later, on September 8.

== Chart performance ==
"Wasn't the Summer Short?" spent its one week on the Billboard Hot 100 in the issue of the magazine dated October 23, 1961, at number 89. It also reached number 17 on Cash Box magazine's Looking Ahead chart, which was described as a "compilation, in order of strength, of up and coming records showing signs of breaking into The Cash Box Top 100".

== Critical reception ==
In their review column, the editors of Cash Box gave "Wasn't the Summer Short?" a letter grade of B+. They described it as a "fine ballad outing". The editors of Billboard wrote that the song was "sung with sincerity and plaintive effectiveness".

== Charts ==
Weekly chart performance for "Wasn't the Summer Short?"
Chart (1961)	Peak position
US Billboard Hot 100	89
US Looking Ahead (Cash Box)	17
