= You Set My Heart to Music =

- US 7-inch single

Single by Johnny Mathis

from the album Portrait of Johnny
- B-side: "Jenny"
- Released: March 20, 1961
- Recorded: March 4, 1961
- Genre: Pop
- Length: 2:45
- Label: Columbia
- Songwriter: Eaton Magoon Jr.
- Producer: Frank De Vol

Johnny Mathis singles chronology
"How to Handle a Woman" (1960)	"You Set My Heart to Music" / "Jenny" (1961)	"Wasn't the Summer Short?" (1961)

Music video
- "You Set My Heart to Music" on YouTube

"You Set My Heart to Music" is a popular song written by Eaton Magoon Jr. for the 1961 Broadway musical 13 Daughters. A recording of the song by Johnny Mathis charted that same year.

== In 13 Daughters ==
"You Set My Heart to Music" was performed in the musical by the characters Emmaloa, Chun and Isabel, who were played, respectively, by Monica Boyar, Don Ameche and Gina Viglione.

== Johnny Mathis recording and release ==
Mathis recorded "You Set My Heart to Music" with an orchestra conducted by Ray Ellis on March 4, 1961, just two days after 13 Daughters opened on Broadway. The Mathis recording was produced by Frank De Vol and released as a single two weeks later, on March 20.

== Chart performance ==
"You Set My Heart to Music" "bubbled under" Billboard magazine's Hot 100 for two weeks in April 1961; it got as high as number 107. It reached number 95 on Cash Box magazine's best seller list. It peaked at number 4 on the pop chart in the Philippines.

== Critical reception ==
In their review column, the editors of Cash Box magazine featured the single as their Pick of the Week, which was their equivalent to a letter grade of A for both "You Set My Heart to Music" and its B-side, "Jenny". They wrote, "Artist once again dons his best ballad outfit as he beautifully carves out the romantic lovely, 'You Set My Heart To Music'." They also noted, "Fine Ray Ellis ork support." The editors of Billboard categorized the single as a "Spotlight Winner", one of the best of the week's new releases.

== Charts ==
Weekly chart performance for "You Set My Heart to Music"
Chart (1961)	Peak position
Philippines	4
US Bubbling Under the Hot 100 (Billboard)	107
US Top 100 Best Selling Tunes on Records (Cash Box)	95

== Bibliography ==
- Whitburn, Joel (2009), Joel Whitburn's Top Pop Singles, 1955-2008, Record Research Inc., ISBN 978-0-89820-180-2
- Whitburn, Joel (2014), Joel Whitburn's Cash Box Pop Hits 1952-1996, Record Research Inc., ISBN 978-0-89820-209-0
