= Irving Townsend =

American record producer (1920–1981)

- Born: Irving Joseph Townsend; November 27, 1920; Springfield, Massachusetts, U.S.
- Died: December 17, 1981 (aged 61); Santa Ynez, California, U.S.
- Occupation: Producer and author
- Education: Princeton University

Irving Townsend (November 27, 1920 – December 17, 1981) was an American record producer and author. He is most famous for having produced the Miles Davis album Kind of Blue, which is the best-selling jazz album of all time according to the RIAA. He later served as president of the National Academy of Recording Arts and Sciences of the United States.

Townsend, a former jazz bandleader, became an advertising copywriter for Columbia Records. He then convinced George Avakian to have him assist on recording sessions, and by the mid-1950s he was a full-time producer. He became Davis's producer after the departures of Avakian and Cal Lampley.

Townsend wrote many liner notes for Columbia, including notes for the album Black, Brown and Beige by Duke Ellington and Mahalia Jackson. In 1975, Townsend wrote an article in The Atlantic Monthly called "Ellington in Private" detailing his meeting with Duke at Newport Jazz Festival in 1956 which led to Ellington's subsequent signing with Columbia.

== Selected Production Discography ==
- Billie Holiday
- Miles Davis
- Mahalia Jackson
- Leonard Bernstein
- Duke Ellington
- André Previn
- Johnny Mathis
- Percy Faith
- Wayne Shorter
- Chico Hamilton
- Jimmy Rushing
- Dave Brubeck
- Doris Day
- Ada Moore
- Flatt & Scruggs
- Frankie Laine

== Author ==
- John Hammond on Record: An Autobiography (co-author)
- The Less Expensive Spread: Delights & Dilemmas of a Weekend Cowboy
- The Tavern
- Separate Lifetimes
- Articles in various publications including The Atlantic Monthly
