= People (Johnny Mathis album) =

Greatest hits album by Johnny Mathis
- Released: 1969
- Recorded: 1963–1966
- Genres: Vocal; pop/rock; stage & screen
- Length: 31:43
- Label: Columbia
- Producers: Johnny Mathis; Al Ham; Norman Newell; Don Riebert

Johnny Mathis chronology
Those Were the Days (1968)	People (1969)	The Impossible Dream (1969)

Professional ratings
Review scores
Source	Rating
Billboard	positive
The Encyclopedia of Popular Music	3/5 stars

People is a compilation album by American pop singer Johnny Mathis that was released in the summer of 1969 by Columbia Records at the same time as another Mathis compilation, The Impossible Dream. Both releases include ten tracks from albums that he recorded during his time with Mercury Records between 1963 and 1967.

The People compilation peaked at number 192 during its two weeks on Billboard magazine's Top LPs chart in September 1969.

People and The Impossible Dream were released for the first time on compact disc on June 9, 2009, as two albums on one CD.

== Track listing ==
=== Side one ===
1. "Sunny" (Bobby Hebb) – 4:19
  - rec. 10/31/66 for the album Johnny Mathis Sings, rel. 3/10/67
2. "More" from Mondo Cane (Norman Newell, Nino Oliviero, Riz Ortolani) – 2:56
  - rec. 3/12/64 for the album This Is Love, rel. 9/18/64
3. "The Shadow of Your Smile" from The Sandpiper (Johnny Mandel, Paul Francis Webster) – 3:03
  - rec. 1/12/66 for the album The Shadow of Your Smile, rel. 3/66
4. "Elusive Butterfly" (Bob Lind) – 2:09
  - rec. 5/31/66 for the album So Nice, rel. 9/16/66
5. "Autumn Leaves" (Joseph Kosma, Johnny Mercer, Jacques Prevert) – 3:45
  - rec. 5/7/65 for the album The Sweetheart Tree, rel. 9/30/65

=== Side two ===
1. "A Wonderful Day Like Today" from The Roar of the Greasepaint – The Smell of the Crowd (Leslie Bricusse, Anthony Newley) – 2:42
  - rec. 5/6/65 for the album The Sweetheart Tree, rel. 9/30/65
2. "Laura" from Laura (David Raksin, Johnny Mercer) - 4:38
  - rec. in 1963 for the album Tender Is the Night, rel. 1/23/64
3. "Quiet Nights Of Quiet Stars (Corcovado)" (Antonio Carlos Jobim, Gene Lees) – 2:26
  - rec. 1/13/66 for the album The Shadow of Your Smile, rel. 3/66
4. "What the World Needs Now Is Love" (Burt Bacharach, Hal David) – 2:39
  - rec. 5/31/66 for the album So Nice, rel. 9/16/66
5. "People" from Funny Girl (Bob Merrill, Jule Styne) – 3:08
  - rec. 12/9/64 for the album Love Is Everything, rel. 3/5/65

== Personnel ==
- Johnny Mathis – vocals; producer (except as noted)
- Al Ham – producer ("People")
- Norman Newell – producer ("Autumn Leaves", "A Wonderful Day Like Today")
- Don Riebert – producer ("Quiet Nights Of Quiet Stars (Corcovado)", "The Shadow of Your Smile")
- Linda Solomon – liner notes
- Frank Bez – photography

== Bibliography ==
- Whitburn, Joel (2010), Joel Whitburn Presents Top Pop Albums, Seventh Edition, Record Research Inc., ISBN 0-89820-183-7
