= The Impossible Dream (Johnny Mathis album) =

Compilation album by Johnny Mathis
- Released: 1969
- Recorded: 1964–1966
- Genre: Vocal; pop/rock; stage & screen
- Length: 32:03
- Label: Columbia
- Producer: Johnny Mathis; Al Ham; Norman Newell; Don Riebert

Johnny Mathis chronology
People (1969)	The Impossible Dream (1969)	Love Theme from "Romeo And Juliet" (A Time for Us) (1969)

Professional ratings
Review scores
Source	Rating
Billboard	positive
The Encyclopedia of Popular Music	4/5 stars

The Impossible Dream is a compilation album by American pop singer Johnny Mathis that was released in the summer of 1969 by Columbia Records at the same time as another Mathis compilation, People. Both releases include ten tracks from albums that he recorded during his time with Mercury Records between 1963 and 1967.

The Impossible Dream made it first appearance on Billboard magazine's Top LPs chart in the issue dated August 16, 1969, and got as high as number 163 during its four weeks there.

People and The Impossible Dream were released for the first time on compact disc on June 9, 2009, as two albums on one CD.

== Track listing ==
=== Side one ===
1. "I Will Wait for You" from The Umbrellas of Cherbourg (Jacques Demy, Norman Gimbel, Michel LeGrand) – 3:01
  - rec. 5/31/66 for the album So Nice, rel. 9/16/66
2. "Strangers in the Night" (Bert Kaempfert, Charles Singleton, Eddie Snyder) – 3:30
  - rec. 10/31/66 for the album Johnny Mathis Sings, rel. 3/10/67
3. "So Nice" (Norman Gimbel, Marcos Valle, Paulo Sergio Valle) – 3:06
  - rec. 7/7/66 for the album So Nice, rel. 9/16/66
4. "The Very Thought of You" (Ray Noble) – 3:49
  - rec. 5/8/65 for the album The Sweetheart Tree, rel. 9/30/65
5. "On a Clear Day You Can See Forever" from On a Clear Day You Can See Forever (Alan Jay Lerner, Burton Lane) – 2:43
  - rec. 8/27/65 for the album The Shadow of Your Smile, rel. 3/66

=== Side two ===
1. "Moment to Moment" from Moment to Moment (Henry Mancini, Johnny Mercer) – 2:23
  - rec. 1/12/66 for the album The Shadow of Your Smile, rel. 3/66
2. "Somewhere My Love (Lara's Theme)" (Maurice Jarre, Paul Francis Webster) – 3:30
  - rec. 10/31/66 for the album Johnny Mathis Sings, rel. 3/10/67
3. "Go Away Little Girl" (Gerry Goffin, Carole King) – 3:18
  - rec. 12/10/64 for the album Love Is Everything, rel. 3/5/65
4. "Eleanor Rigby" (John Lennon, Paul McCartney) – 2:54
  - rec. 10/31/66 for the album Johnny Mathis Sings, rel. 3/10/67
5. "The Impossible Dream (The Quest)" from Man of La Mancha (Joe Darion, Mitch Leigh) – 3:44
  - rec. 5/31/66 for the album So Nice, rel. 9/16/66

== Personnel ==
- Johnny Mathis – vocals; producer (except as noted)
- Al Ham – producer ("Go Away Little Girl")
- Norman Newell – producer ("The Very Thought of You")
- Don Riebert – producer ("On a Clear Day You Can See Forever", "Moment to Moment")
- Virginia Team – cover design
- Ivan Nagy, Camera 5 – photographs

== Bibliography ==
- Whitburn, Joel (2010), Joel Whitburn Presents Top Pop Albums, Seventh Edition, Record Research Inc., ISBN 0-89820-183-7
