= The Complete Global Albums Collection =

Box set by Johnny Mathis
- Released: November 17, 2014
- Recorded: 1963–1966
- Genres: Vocal; stage & screen; R&B; pop/rock; easy listening
- Length: 8:04:29
- Labels: Sony Music Entertainment; Legacy Recordings

Johnny Mathis chronology
The Classic Christmas Album (2014)	The Complete Global Albums Collection (2014)	The Singles (2015)

The Complete Global Albums Collection is a 13-disc box set by American pop singer Johnny Mathis that was released in 2014 by Legacy Recordings. It includes the 11 studio albums recorded by Mathis's own production company, Global Records, and originally distributed by Mercury Records between 1963 and 1966, as well as 31 additional tracks, 16 of which were being made available for the first time.

== History ==
In 1963 Mathis left his original label, Columbia Records, for Mercury due to three factors: more money, "plus total control over his recording activities, and the added perk of owning his own masters." The time of this transition was already a busy one: "During that same time I was working non-stop at different nightclubs around Manhattan... sometimes four or five performances a night at the Copacabana, The Blue Angel, Basin Street East. I was doing all this singing at night and then signed to record in the daytime. So a lot of the work I did at Mercury was done under a lot of duress."

Because Mathis was used to the mentors he'd always had while recording at Columbia, his new position of power was a bit of a shock. "Now, all of a sudden, I was in charge of my own decisions in the studio, and I didn't have someone to guide me on what I was doing, right or wrong." Although Don Costa was at the helm of his first Mercury LP, Sounds of Christmas, Mathis took on the role of producer for the next several albums. "But I wasn't a producer, and I didn't really realize until then how important producers were and how much they assisted me in my work." After his Mercury contract expired and he returned to Columbia (bringing the Global material with him), Mathis had a much clearer sense of what he had been missing during his time away. "I needed someone to listen and suggest alternatives as far as my note selections were concerned... a producer who listens to you and says, 'I like what you're doing, but I hate that last note you made. Don't do that... do this.'" For the 48 years between his last recording session for Mercury and the release of this box set, he has stayed with Columbia.

== Album listing ==
The first 11 of the 13 discs each contain one of the Global/Mercury albums:

- Sounds of Christmas (1963)
- Tender Is the Night (1964)
- The Wonderful World of Make Believe (1964)
- This Is Love (1964)
- Olé (1964)
- Broadway (1964)
- Love Is Everything (1965)
- The Sweetheart Tree (1965)
- The Shadow of Your Smile (1966)
- So Nice (1966)
- Johnny Mathis Sings (1967)

The disc for The Sweetheart Tree includes three bonus tracks that were part of the recording sessions for the album but only included on the UK version, which was titled Away from Home:

1. "Try a Little Tenderness" (Jimmy Campbell, Reg Connelly, Harry M. Woods) – 3:25
  - Alyn Aynsworth – arranger, conductor
  - recorded on May 8, 1965
2. "If Love Were All" (Noël Coward) – 3:51
  - Tony Osborne – arranger, conductor
  - recorded on May 6, 1965
3. "If I Had You" (Jimmy Campbell, Reg Connelly, Ted Shapiro) – 3:23
  - Alyn Aynsworth – arranger, conductor
  - recorded on May 8, 1965

The two remaining CDs contain songs that were originally distributed in the 7-inch vinyl format or were not commercially available before.

== Singles and Unreleased, Vol. One ==
=== Track listing ===
1. "Bye Bye Barbara" (Jack Segal, Paul Vance) – 2:38
2. "No More" (Dottie Wayne, Ben Weisman) – 2:48
3. "The Fall of Love" (Dimitri Tiomkin, Ned Washington^{[C]}) – 3:00
4. "Funny Little Girl"^{[A]} (Charles Mound) – 3:16
5. "A Great Night for Crying" (Dottie Wayne, Ben Weisman) – 2:48
6. "Taste of Tears" (Teddy Bart, Paul Wyatt) – 2:46
7. "White Roses from a Blue Valentine" (Jerry Gladstone, Lew Spence) – 2:50
8. "All I Wanted"^{[A]}^{[B]} (Morton Goode, Ralph Siegel, Gerhard Winkler) – 2:04
9. "Listen Lonely Girl"^{[B]} (Richard Ahlert, James Lyons, Robert William Scott) – 2:31
10. "While Stephanie Sleeps"^{[A]} (Ron Pataky, Alvin Waslohn) – 3:09
11. "That Awkward Age"^{[A]} (Jon Hendricks) – 2:56
12. "Two Tickets and a Candy Heart"^{[B]} (Leon Carr, Paul Vance) – 2:12
13. "Reserved for Lovers"^{[A]}^{[B]} (unknown) – 2:56
14. "Unbelievable"^{[A]} (Charles Singleton) – 2:52
15. "Keep It Simple"^{[A]} (Lee Pockriss, Paul Vance) – 1:54
- ^{A} previously unreleased
- ^{B} mono recording
- ^{C} songwriter credit given to Paul Francis Webster in the liner notes booklet for this compilation, but the original single and the BMI Foundation website credit Washington

=== Personnel ===
- Don Costa – arranger (tracks 1–7), conductor (track 1)
- Jack Feierman – conductor (tracks 2–7)
- Claus Ogerman – arranger (tracks 8–11)
- Quincy Jones – conductor (tracks 8–15)
- Torrie Zito – arranger (tracks 12–15)

=== Recording dates ===
- July 15, 1963 – track 1
- November 4, 1963 – tracks 2, 5
- March 18, 1964 – tracks 3, 4, 6, 7
- August 27, 1964 – tracks 8–11
- August 31, 1964 – tracks 12–15

== Singles and Unreleased, Vol. Two ==
=== Track listing ===
1. "Blowin' in the Wind"^{[A]} (Bob Dylan) – 3:48
2. "Lover"^{[A]} (Lorenz Hart, Richard Rodgers) – 3:44
3. "But Beautiful"^{[A]} (Johnny Burke, Jimmy Van Heusen) – 3:57
4. "Shall We Dance"^{[A]} (Oscar Hammerstein II, Richard Rodgers) - 3:07
5. "Some People"^{[A]} (Stephen Sondheim, Jule Styne) – 2:07
6. "Take the Time" (Robert Allen) – 2:52
7. "The Slender Thread"^{[A]} (Quincy Jones, Bob Russell) – 2:31
8. "Love Is a Many-Splendored Thing" (Sammy Fain, Paul Francis Webster) – 3:44
9. "The Glass Mountain" (Ray Evans, Percy Faith, Jay Livingston) – 2:59
10. "After the Storm" (Tom Garlock, Alan Jeffreys) – 2:40
11. "Portrait of My Love"^{[A]} (Cyril Ornadel, David West) – 3:27
12. "Bluesette"^{[A]} (Norman Gimbel, Toots Thielemans) – 3:21
13. "The Jimmy Brown Song (The Three Bells)"^{[A]} (rehearsal track) (Bert Reisfeld, Jean Villard) – 4:40
- ^{A} previously unreleased

=== Personnel ===
- Glenn Osser – arranger, conductor (tracks 1, 6, 7, 12)
- Don Rieber – producer (tracks 1, 7, 8, 10, 12)
- Robert Allen – producer (track 6)
- Cyril Ornadel – arranger, conductor (tracks 8, 11)
- Norman Newell – producer (track 13)

The credits provided for this disc in the booklet are complete as shown here. Tracks 2, 3, 4, 5, and 9 have no personnel listed in the box set packaging.

=== Recording dates ===
- April 19, 1965 – track 6
- November 14, 1965 – track 1, 7, 12
- November 18, 1965 – track 8
- December 9, 1965 – track 13
- January 20, 1966 – tracks 9, 10
- June 23, 1966 – tracks 5, 11

The CD booklet indicates that the recording dates for tracks 2, 3, and 4 are unknown.

== Missing tracks ==
Seven tracks issued on the Mercury Records label are not included here:

1. "Come Back" Issued on 7" single Mercury 72184. Issued as an A-side in 1963.
2. "Your Teenage Dreams" Issued on 7" single Mercury 72184. Issued as a B-side in 1963.
3. "Dianacita" Issued on Mercury 72432. Issued as a B-side in 1965.

Four of these tracks were recorded with The Young Americans for the 1965 album The Young Americans Presented By Johnny Mathis:

1. "What’s New At The Zoo"
2. "I Love to Hear a Banjo"
3. "Clap Yo' Hands"
4. "Chim Chim Cheree"

== Personnel ==
- Johnny Mathis – vocals

Box set

- Johnny Mathis – executive producer; liner notes
- Didier C. Deutsch – producer (box set and discs 12 & 13)
- Tim Sturges – producer (discs 12 & 13); mixing and mastering (discs 12 & 13)
- Jim Lane – project director
- Mark Wilder – remastering (discs 1–11)
- Maria Triana – assistant remastering engineer
- Matt Cavaluzzo – archival transfers
- Edward O'Dowd – art direction and design
- Mike Panico – archival assistance
- Tom Tierney – archival assistance
- Che Williams – archival assistance
- Sony Music Photo Archives – photography

- Discs 1–11 mastered at Battery Studios, New York City
