= Johnny Mathis: Wonderful, Wonderful! =

2007 television programme

- DVD cover
- Genre: Vocal
- Directed by: Michael Beyer
- Starring: Johnny Mathis
- Country of origin: United States
- Original language: English

Production
- Executive producers: Evan Haiman; John Carlo Vernile; JoAnn Young
- Producers: James Arntz; JoAnn Young
- Production locations: Tropicana Hotel, Atlantic City
- Running time: 60 minutes

Original release
- Network: PBS
- Release: December 2006

Johnny Mathis: Wonderful, Wonderful! is a television concert by American pop singer Johnny Mathis that was recorded on October 27, 2006, at the Tropicana Hotel in Atlantic City and aired that December on most PBS stations. In addition to singing some of his biggest hits, he covers tracks from his live albums ("In the Morning" from Johnny Mathis in Person: Recorded Live at Las Vegas and "To the Ends of the Earth" from Unforgettable – A Musical Tribute to Nat King Cole), songs from Brazil ("Manhã de Carnaval" from Olé and "Brazil (Aquarela do Brasil)" from The Ultimate Hits Collection), and two exclusives ("Let Go (Canto de ossanho)" and "Pure Imagination") that have never appeared on a Mathis album. Interview clips with Mathis were inserted at intervals throughout the concert along with live performance excerpts from programs such as The Tonight Show Starring Johnny Carson and The Andy Williams Show.

The concert was released on DVD on February 27, 2007, with the title Gold: A 50th Anniversary Celebration, which is also the title of a separate compilation album of his that was released in 2006. The DVD bonus materials include a tour of Mathis's Los Angeles home, a photo gallery, and additional performances from the concert, including a medley of hits by Henry Mancini that has three more exclusives ("Two for the Road", "Charade", and "Days of Wine and Roses") and another Brazilian number ("Felicidade", which he originally recorded as part of a medley with "Generique" on Olé).

== DVD track listing ==
1. Opening and Overture
2. "In the Morning" (Barry Gibb)
3. Hits Medley
  a. "It's Not for Me to Say" (Robert Allen, Al Stillman)
  b. "Chances Are" (Allen, Stillman)
  c. "Wonderful! Wonderful!" (Sherman Edwards, Ben Raleigh)
4. A Lot of Good Memories: interview segment including performance excerpt of
  "Bluesette" (Norman Gimbel, Toots Thielemans) from The Andy Williams Show
5. "Let Go (Canto de ossanho)" (Gimbel, Baden Powell, Vinicius de Moraes)
6. "To the Ends of the Earth" (Joe Sherman, Noel Sherman)
7. What I Did for Love: excerpt from a live performance of
  "What I Did for Love" (Marvin Hamlisch, Edward Kleban) in 1975
8. Kismet Medley
  a. "Baubles, Bangles and Beads" (Alexander Borodin, George Forrest, Robert Wright)
  b. "Stranger in Paradise" (Borodin, Wright, Forrest)
9. "Secret Love" (Sammy Fain, Paul Francis Webster)
10. Success Came Quickly: interview segment including performance excerpt of
  "Maria" (Leonard Bernstein, Stephen Sondheim) from 1977
11. "Misty" (Johnny Burke, Erroll Garner)
12. The Holy Trinity: interview segment
13. "99 Miles from L.A." (Hal David, Albert Hammond)
14. "The Twelfth of Never" (Jerry Livingston, Paul Francis Webster)
15. My Craft: interview segment beginning with performance excerpt of
  "Pieces of Dreams" (Alan and Marilyn Bergman, Michel Legrand) from The Tonight Show Starring Johnny Carson from 1978
16. "A Certain Smile" (Sammy Fain, Paul Francis Webster)
17. Too Much, Too Little, Too Late: interview segment including performance excerpt of
  "Too Much, Too Little, Too Late" (Nat Kipner, John Vallins) from 1978 that was performed with Deniece Williams
18. Brazilian Medley
  a."Manhã de Carnaval" (Luiz Bonfá, Antônio Maria)
  b. "Brazil (Aquarela do Brasil)" (Ary Barroso, Bob Russell)
19. "Pure Imagination" (Leslie Bricusse, Anthony Newley): screen shared with end credits

=== Bonus Features ===
Bonus performances

1. Mancini Medley
  a. "Two for the Road" (Bricusse, Henry Mancini)
  b. "Charade" (Mancini, Johnny Mercer)
  c. "Days of Wine and Roses" (Mancini, Mercer)
  d. "Moon River" (Mancini, Mercer)
2. "It's All in the Game"^{[A]} (Charles Dawes, Carl Sigman)
3. "Let Me Be the One" (Roger Nichols, Paul Williams)
4. "Fly Me to the Moon (In Other Words)" (Bart Howard)
5. "Young and Foolish" (Albert Hague, Arnold B. Horwitt)
6. "Sands of Time" (Alexander Borodin, George Forrest, Robert Wright)
7. "Felicidade" (Antonio Carlos Jobim, Vinicius de Moraes)
8. "Pure Imagination" (Leslie Bricusse, Anthony Newley): full-screen version of closing number
9. "Toyland" (Glen MacDonough, Victor Herbert)
- ^{A} Take 6 does not perform on this track as the packaging indicates

Tour of Johnny's Los Angeles home
Photo gallery
