= Here I Am (Barbara McNair album) =

Studio album by Barbara McNair
- Released: 1966
- Studio: Hitsville USA, Detroit and in Los Angeles
- Genre: Soul, pop, jazz
- Label: Motown

Barbara McNair chronology
The Livin' End (1964)	Here I Am (1966)	I Enjoy Being A Girl (1966)

Singles from Here I Am
- 1. "Here I Am Baby" Released: 1967

Here I Am is the fifth studio album by singer Barbara McNair released on the Motown label.

== History ==
This album was McNair's first album on the Motown label, released in 1966. McNair recorded several singles before this album was released. The album featured songwriters Clarence Paul, Smokey Robinson, Eddie Holland, and Ron Miller. However, the album failed to chart. The only single, "Here I Am Baby", peaked at No. 125 on the Billboard Hot 100. The album appeared on the New Album Releases on Billboard magazine, the only album on the Motown category. "Here I Am Baby" was later covered by the Marvelettes for their Sophisticated Soul album.

== Reception ==
Professional ratings
Review scores
Source	Rating
AllMusic	4/5 stars

Rob Theakston from AllMusic stated "Here I Am is a far cry from the sexy Motown sessions and takes a turn into vocal standards and sultry jazz numbers, but McNair is equally up to the task to deliver a fine session of performances. It was also a precursor for many of the outstanding vocal spotlights she would perform on her critically acclaimed variety show five years later." Billboard wrote that "Miss McNair tackles recent pop hits, adds her own stylings with emphasis on the blues feel, and the result is a programming delight with much sales potential."

== Track listing ==
Side one
No.	Title	Writer(s)	Length
1.	"My World Is Empty Without You"	Holland–Dozier–Holland	3:03
2.	"Message to Michael"	Burt Bacharach, Hal David	2:51
3.	"Everything is Good About You"	Eddie Holland, James Dean	3:24
4.	"Here I Am Baby"	Smokey Robinson	2:50
5.	"Steal Away Tonight"	Clarence Paul, Dave Hamilton	3:00
6.	"For Once in My Life"	Ron Miller, Orlando Murden	3:00

Side two
No.	Title	Writer(s)	Length
7.	"The Shadow of Your Smile"	Johnny Mandel, Paul Francis Webster	3:02
8.	"I Will Wait for You"	Michel Legrand, Jacques Demy	3:12
9.	"The Sweetheart Tree"	Henry Mancini, Johnny Mercer	2:21
10.	"What A Day"	R. Miller	2:48
11.	"Strangers in the Night"	Bert Kaempfert, Charles Singleton, Eddie Snyder	2:59
12.	"Fancy Passes"	Avery Vandenburg, R. Miller, William O'Malley	3:29

== Charts ==
=== Singles ===
Year	Single	Chart positions
Year	Single	US
1967	"Here I Am Baby"	125
