= The Shadow of Your Smile =

1965 song composed by Johnny Mandel

- Sheet music cover

Song
- Released: 1965
- Genre: Easy Listening
- Songwriters: Johnny Mandel; Paul Francis Webster

"The Shadow of Your Smile", also known as "Love Theme from The Sandpiper", is a popular song and jazz standard with music by Johnny Mandel and lyrics by Paul Francis Webster. The song was introduced in the 1965 film The Sandpiper and later became an Easy Listening hit for Tony Bennett in a version arranged and conducted by Mandel. It won the Grammy Award for Song of the Year and the Academy Award for Best Original Song.

== Background ==
Johnny Mandel wrote the "Love Theme from The Sandpiper" as part of the score for the film, and his first choice to write the lyrics was Johnny Mercer. The film's producer, however, was unhappy with what Mercer submitted and hired Paul Francis Webster. After Mercer heard what Webster wrote, he said, "I figured with 'The Shadow of Your Smile' he was in love with a lady with a mustache."

== In The Sandpiper ==
The music from the film was conducted by Robert Armbruster and produced by Quincy Jones. The song is heard over the opening credits as an instrumental with jazz trumpeter Jack Sheldon playing the melody. A chorus sings the song over the closing credits. In a review of the soundtrack album, the editors of Billboard magazine described the song as "wistful".

"Love Theme from The Sandpiper (The Shadow of Your Smile)"

Single by Tony Bennett

from the album The Movie Song Album
- B-side: "I'll Miss Her When I Think of Her"
- Released: 1965
- Recorded: September 26, 1965
- Genre: Pop
- Length: 3:34
- Label: Columbia
- Producers: Ernie Altschuler; Allen Stanton

Tony Bennett singles chronology
| "Fly Me to the Moon" (1965) | "Love Theme from The Sandpiper (The Shadow of Your Smile)" (1965) | "Song from The Oscar" (1966) |

Music video
- "The Shadow of Your Smile" on YouTube

== Tony Bennett version ==
The first rendition of the song to become a chart hit was by Tony Bennett, who recorded it on September 26, 1965, with piano accompaniment by Jimmy Rowles and an orchestra conducted by Mandel, who also arranged the music. It was produced by Ernie Altschuler and Allen Stanton and included on The Movie Song Album in 1966.

=== Chart performance ===
Bennett's recording debuted on Billboard's Easy Listening chart in the issue dated November 13, 1965, and got as high as number 28 during its 13 weeks there. The November 20 issue included its first appearance on the Billboard Hot 100, where it peaked at number 95 over the course of six weeks.

=== Critical reception ===
In their review column, the editors of Cash Box magazine featured the single as a Pick of the Week, which was their equivalent to a letter grade of A for both "The Shadow of Your Smile" and its B-side, "I'll Miss Her When I Think of Her". They described Bennett's recording of "The Shadow of Your Smile" as a "top-drawer reading" and wrote, "The chanter dishes up the moody, romantic ballad in his distinctive, full-bodied commanding style." The editors of Billboard wrote that it was "given the special warm Bennett treatment with the potential and appeal of 'I Left My Heart in San Francisco'. A winner all the way!" In a retrospective review for AllMusic, William Ruhlmann wrote that "in 'The Shadow of Your Smile' …, Bennett found material worthy of him".

=== Charts ===
Weekly chart performance for "The Shadow of Your Smile" by Tony Bennett
| Chart (1965) | Peak position |
|---|---|
| US Billboard Easy Listening | 8 |
| US Billboard Hot 100 | 95 |

== Awards and accolades ==
At the 8th Annual Grammy Awards, "The Shadow of Your Smile" was recognized in three categories. Bennett received a nomination for Best Vocal Performance, Male. His recording was also up for Record of the Year. Mandel and Webster won for Song of the Year, beating out "Yesterday" by the Beatles. Alan Livingston, the head of Capitol Records (the Beatles' US label), complained about the decision, saying that "Yesterday" losing Song of the Year "makes a mockery of the whole event".

"The Shadow of Your Smile" also won the Academy Award for Best Original Song at the 38th Academy Awards, where it was sung by Barbara McNair. It was also nominated for the Golden Globe Award for Best Original Song. In 2004, it finished at number 77 in AFI's 100 Years...100 Songs poll of the top tunes in American cinema.

"The Shadow of Your Smile"

Single by Johnny Mathis

from the album The Shadow of Your Smile
- B-side: "The Sweetheart Tree"
- Released: 1966
- Recorded: January 12, 1966
- Genre: Pop
- Length: 3:03
- Label: Mercury
- Producer: Don Rieber

Johnny Mathis singles chronology
| "Moment to Moment" (1966) | "The Shadow of Your Smile" (1966) | "So Nice (Samba de Verao)" (1966) |

Music video
- "The Shadow of Your Smile" on YouTube

== Johnny Mathis version ==
Johnny Mathis recorded the song on January 12, 1966, with an orchestra conducted by Jack Elliott, who also arranged the music. It was produced by Don Rieber for his album The Shadow of Your Smile.

=== Chart performance ===
Mathis's recording of the song "The Shadow of Your Smile" debuted on Music Vendor magazine's Going Up – Heading for the Top 100 chart in the issue dated April 23, 1966, and peaked at number 117 during its seven weeks there.

=== Critical reception ===
In reviews of the album of the same name, Variety wrote, "Mathis does very well by the title song". Billboard noted, "The beautiful ballad from The Sandpiper serves as the title tune and basis for the LP."

=== Charts ===
Weekly chart performance for "The Shadow of Your Smile" by Johnny Mathis
| Chart (1966) | Peak position |
|---|---|
| US Going Up – Heading for the Top 100 (Music Vendor) | 117 |

"The Shadow of Your Smile"

Single by Lou Rawls

from the album Live!
- B-side: "Southside Blues"
- Released: 1966
- Recorded: January 31–February 1, 1966
- Studio: Capitol (Hollywood)
- Genre: Pop
- Length: 4:18
- Label: Capitol
- Producer: David Axelrod

Lou Rawls singles chronology
| "Three O'Clock in the Morning" (1965) | "The Shadow of Your Smile" (1966) | "Love Is a Hurtin' Thing" (1966) |

Music video
- "The Shadow of Your Smile" on YouTube

== Lou Rawls version ==
Lou Rawls recorded the song in front of an invited audience at Capitol Studios in Hollywood for his 1966 album Live! on January 31 and February 1 of that year. It was produced by David Axelrod and featured Tommy Strode on piano, Herb Ellis on guitar, Jimmy Bond on bass and Earl Palmer on drums.

=== Chart performance ===
Rawls's recording spent two weeks in July 1966 on Billboard's R&B chart, during which time it peaked at number 33. It reached number 23 on Cash Box magazine's R&B chart.

=== Critical reception ===
In their review of Live!, the editors of Billboard described the recording as a "memorable rendition". In a retrospective review, AllMusic's Craig Lytle described the arrangement as "moderately paced" and wrote, "But Rawls loses no steam; he romances the lyric with vehemence."

=== Charts ===
Weekly chart performance for "The Shadow of Your Smile" by Lou Rawls
| Chart (1966) | Peak position |
|---|---|
| US Billboard R&B Singles | 33 |
| US Cash Box Top 50 R&B | 23 |

"The Shadow of Your Smile"

Single by Boots Randolph

from the album Boots with Strings
- B-side: "I'll Just Walk Away"
- Released: 1966
- Recorded: 1966
- Genre: Pop
- Length: 3:10
- Label: Monument
- Producer: Fred Foster

Boots Randolph singles chronology
| "Hey, Mr. Sax Man" (1964) | "The Shadow of Your Smile" (1966) | "Miss You" (1966) |

Music video
- "The Shadow of Your Smile" on YouTube

== Boots Randolph version ==
Boots Randolph recorded "The Shadow of Your Smile" for his 1966 album Boots with Strings on which his saxophone provided the melody before a chorus assisted with background vocals. The album was produced by Fred Foster.

=== Chart performance ===
Randolph's recording debuted on the Billboard Hot 100 in the issue of the magazine dated December 24, 1966, and peaked at number 93 during its three weeks there. In that same issue, it became his first song to appear on the magazine's Easy Listening chart, where it spent six weeks and got as high as number 28. It reached number 91 on Cash Box magazine's best seller list and number 90 on the Top 100 Pop Sales and Performance chart in Music Vendor magazine.

=== Critical reception ===
"The Shadow of Your Smile" was singled out in two reviews of Boots with Strings. The editors of Cash Box listed the song as one on which Randolph "plays a smooth, flowing sax which is backed by lush string arrangements". The editors of Billboard wrote that it was "highly danceable".

=== Charts ===
Weekly chart performance for "The Shadow of Your Smile" by Boots Randolph
| Chart (1966–1967) | Peak position |
|---|---|
| US Billboard Easy Listening | 28 |
| US Billboard Hot 100 | 93 |
| US Top 100 Best Selling Tunes on Records (Cash Box) | 91 |
| US Top 100 Pop Sales and Performance (Music Vendor) | 90 |

== Notable cover versions ==
In his 2012 book The Jazz Standards: A Guide to the Repertoire, jazz critic Ted Gioia describes the structure of "The Shadow of Your Smile" in relation to how it should be performed:

The melody moves with a stately emotional logic, as if each succeeding phrase builds from some syllogism of the heart established by the previous notes. Yet this mood is best undersold—as much as I admire this composition, if it is played too forcefully, it comes across as overwrought and insincere. Unlike some songs, which benefit from fireworks in the final bars, this one requires a more measured build-up. The lyrics are better whispered rather than declaimed.

Gioia gives Astrud Gilberto, who covered the song on her 1965 album of the same name, as an example of a singer whose "intimate delivery is perfectly suited for the song". He recommended the recordings on 1965's Bumpin' by Wes Montgomery and 1966's I'm All Smiles by Hampton Hawes and had comments on three versions from 1967. The Bill Evans recording on Further Conversations with Myself "possessed the right temperament", the rendition on Blues Etude by Oscar Peterson "shines", and "a very sensitive reading" was performed by Lou Donaldson with Blue Mitchell and Dr. Lonnie Smith on Mr. Shing-a-Ling.

Gioia also noted, "The retrospective nature of the lyrics, which celebrate a love past rather than a current passion, perhaps endears this song to performers in their golden years." He recommended three covers from albums recorded by musicians who had reached a certain age: Benny Carter was 87 in 1995 when he recorded New York Nights; Hank Jones was 83 when he cut the song with Elvin Jones for Someday My Prince Will Come in 2002; and the original trumpeter on "The Shadow of Your Smile", Jack Sheldon, was in his 70s when he rerecorded it for his 2006 album Listen Up.

=== Billboard reviews ===
Various versions of "The Shadow of Your Smile" have been praised by the editors of Billboard in reviews of the albums or singles on which they appear. The editors described the song as a "plaintive ballad" when Peggy Lee's recording was issued as a single in 1965 and wrote, "Sensitive, smooth Lee performance." Several covers were released in 1966, including one on Latin Pulse by Nancy Ames, which was one of the songs to which she brought "added refreshment". They described Lou Christie's rendition of the song on Painter of Hits as "well done". Regarding Bobby Darin Sings The Shadow of Your Smile, they wrote that he performed the five songs nominated for an Academy Award "with excitement, understanding and respect for the importance of each composition." They wrote that it received a "lush treatment" on Ferrante and Teicher's You Asked for It! The rendition on Here's That Rainy Day by the Paul Horn Quintet was "lush and beautiful".

Other 1966 reviews mentioned the song. The instrumental recording on The Academy Award-Winning Shadow of Your Smile & Other Great Themes by Andre Kostelanetz was one of the tracks that was "solidly built". Barbara Lewis had a "softly beautiful" arrangement of the song on her album It's Magic. In their review of pianist Peter Nero's album The Screen Scene, they wrote that it was "performed brilliantly". The song was included on a list of those that "really light up" on Come Alive! by Joanie Sommers. They thought it received an "exceptional brass treatment" on Billy Strange's In the Mexican Bag. It was one of the songs on Sarah Vaughan's The New Scene about which they wrote, "[H]er interpretations are both entertaining and refreshing". The Two Sides of Mary Wells had "a smooth 'Shadow of Your Smile' standing out in the ballad half." The editors felt Nancy Wilson gave an "exceptional interpretation" on A Touch of Today.

Four albums from 1967 included noteworthy covers. The recording on Clare Fischer's Songs for Rainy Day Lovers was "[f]ascinating". Barbara McNair's version was a "standout" on Here I Am. The song received the "Garneresque treatment" on That's My Kick by Erroll Garner. The Latin rendition on Golden Hits by Roger Williams was described as "excellent". Two reviews from 1968 mentioned the song. The rendition on La La Means I Love You by The Delfonics was "slick and silky". Regarding This Is Al Martino, they wrote, "Persuasive, romantic, his rich baritone moves with personality through such [songs] as … 'The Shadow of Your Smile'."

=== Cash Box reviews ===
Cash Box magazine editors also highlighted many 1966 recordings of the song. What Now My Love by Herb Alpert and the Tijuana Brass included an "inimitable interpretation". Regarding Ed Ames Sings the Hits of Broadway and Hollywood, they wrote, "The chanter's rich, warm tones enrich such outings as … 'The Shadow of Your Smile'." It was part of a "well-chosen selection" on Ray Anthony's Hit Songs to Remember. The song received the "popular mariachi treatment" on The Brass Ring's Love Theme from The Flight of the Phoenix. In their review of That Lovin' Feeling by King Curtis, they wrote, "Curtis's excellent sounds recreate the mystique of the likes of 'The Shadow of Your Smile'." When Ella Fitzgerald's recording was released as a single, they felt she did a "lovely job of interpreting" it.

In reviewing 1966's The Further Adventures of El Chico by Chico Hamilton, the editors wrote, "Chico’s latest outing features such personnel as Gabor Szabo [and] Ron Carter … wailing their way through tunes like … 'The Shadow Of Your Smile'." Walt Harper's rendition on his album On the Road was a "blue ribbon effort". Pianist Ahmad Jamal recorded the song with bassist Jamil Nasser, drummer Vernel Fournier and a fifteen-piece string ensemble for his album Rhapsody; the editors wrote, "The combination is powerfully infectious, especially on such top tracks as 'The Shadow of Your Smile'." A recording by Eric Kloss was released as a single and described as an "[u]pbeat jazz instrumental". Julius La Rosa's "inimitable style" was "applied" to the song on You're Gonna Hear From Me. Ketty Lester gave an "excellently done reading" of the song on When a Woman Loves a Man.

On the 1966 album Trini, Trini Lopez "puts heart and soul into his reading of 'The Shadow of Your Smile'". Regarding Mr. Music, they wrote, "Mantovani is at his usual high level with this superb LP that gives the magic Mantovani touch to such recent items as … 'The Shadow of Your Smile'." It was one of the "outstanding tracks" on Rhapsodies for Young Lovers by the Midnight String Quartet. When Chris Montez's album was named The More I See You/Call Me after his two most successful singles, the editors wrote, "Montez adds a host of good sounds to the pair of hits with his readings of such tunes as … 'The Shadow of Your Smile'." It was an "outstanding effort" on Enzo Stuarti's Soft and Sentimental. Regarding The Shadow of Your Smile by Andy Williams, they wrote that his "provoking reading of the Academy Award winning title tune tells why both it and Williams are winners".

Recordings from 1967 also were noted. In their review of Milt Jackson's album Born Free, the editors wrote, "Delicate, incisive jazz sounds are the order of the day on this set as vibraharpist Milt Jackson swings through … 'The Shadow of Your Smile'." The rendition on The Best of Wes Montgomery was described as "potent". On Sound Pieces by Oliver Nelson, it was one of the songs that "demonstrates the artist's skill at thematic improvisation along with his command of dynamics". About Here It Is: The Exciting Piano and Rhythms of the Quartette Tres Bien, they wrote that "deft melodic touches are always dominant in the themes of such tunes as … 'The Shadow of Your Smile'". On Johnny Smith, the song was part of "a satisfying session of well-chosen and paced music". Reviewing The Impossible Dream by Jerry Vale, they wrote "The artist's smooth, robust vocal style is ideally suited to" the song.

=== AllMusic reviews ===
AllMusic critics also praised covers of the song. John Bush wrote in his review of June Christy's 1965 album Something Broadway, Something Latin that it was "perfect for her introspection". Seven recordings from 1966 albums were also mentioned retrospectively. In his review of Perry Como's Lightly Latin, Eugene Chadbourne explained, "The band goes off in at least three directions once the main part of 'The Shadow of Your Smile' begins, the arranger obviously equating smiling with running for office." Bruce Eder included it on a list of songs on Changes by Johnny Rivers that "are successful in showing off his singing in a different vein, and the softer, finer nuances that his voice could express". Chadbourne described the rendition on Morgana King's Wild Is Love! as "interpreted in a manner simultaneously graceful and perfect".

Regarding Mrs. Miller's Greatest Hits, Michael Ofjord wrote, "'The Shadow of Your Smile' adds another touch of novelty as it begins with an organ passage sounding as though it came straight from a funeral home." Jason Ankeny wrote about Bunky Green's Playin' for Keeps album and how certain musicians on it were "clearly relishing the indelible melodies of selections like 'The Shadow of Your Smile'". In his comment on the version on Charlie Byrd's A Touch of Gold, Thom Jurek wrote that "samba rhythms permeated the arrangements and Byrd's solo that played counterpoint to the melody and in places enhanced the lyric of the tune rather than took away from it." Jurek also reviewed Catch the Groove: Live at the Penthouse 1963-1967 by Cal Tjader, noting that it was one of the songs that "reflect a developed approach to Latin jazz".

Scott Yanow reviewed the Art Farmer Quintet's 1967 album The Time and the Place and wrote, "Farmer is particularly inspired on the ballads, including 'The Shadow of Your Smile'." Yanow described the 1967 recording on the Modern Jazz Quartet's Live at the Lighthouse as an "excellent ballad rendition". Robert Taylor called the 1968 recording on Joe's Blues by Joe Pass a "highlight". Yanow called the song a "warhorse" in his review of the 1971 Dexter Gordon concert on the album The Shadow of Your Smile, which had a "lengthy and creative rendition".

In his review of 1985's Rosemary Clooney Sings Ballads, Yanow wrote, "Clooney's versions of such songs as 'The Shadow of Your Smile', … are filled with sincere feeling and rank with the best versions ever." Alex Henderson reviewed 1998's Jack Jones Paints a Tribute to Tony Bennett and wrote that "the excellent CD finds Jones putting his own stamp on" the song. In a review of Marvin Gaye's Love Songs: Bedroom Ballads, which was a partial reissue of his posthumous album Vulnerable, William Ruhlmann wrote, "Working with lush string arrangements arranged by Bobby Scott, Gaye rewrites the melodies of familiar songs like 'The Shadow of Your Smile' …, rendering the material fresh and claiming it for his own."

== Bibliography ==
- Gioia, Ted (2012), The Jazz Standards: A Guide to the Repertoire, New York City: Oxford University Press, ISBN 978-0-19-993739-4
- Mercer, Johnny; Kimball, Robert; Day, Barry; Kreuger, Miles; Davis, Eric (2009), The Complete Lyrics of Johnny Mercer, Knopf Doubleday Publishing Group, ISBN 978-0-307-26519-7
- Miles, Barry (2001), The Beatles Diary Volume 1: The Beatles Years, London: Omnibus Press, ISBN 0-7119-8308-9
- O'Neil, Thomas (1999), The Grammys, Perigree Books, ISBN 0-399-52477-0
- O'Neil, Thomas (2003), Movie Awards: The Ultimate, Unofficial Guide to the Oscars, Golden Globes, Critics, Guild & Indie Honors, Perigree Books, ISBN 978-0-39952-922-1
- Whitburn, Joel (2007), Joel Whitburn Presents Billboard Top Adult Songs, 1961-2006, Record Research Inc., ISBN 978-0898201697
- Whitburn, Joel (2009), Joel Whitburn's Top Pop Singles, 1955-2008, Record Research Inc., ISBN 0898201802
- Whitburn, Joel (2012a), Joel Whitburn's Hit Records 101-150 1959-1982, Record Research Inc., ISBN 978-0-89820-201-4
- Whitburn, Joel (2012b), Joel Whitburn's Hit Records 1954-1982, Record Research Inc., ISBN 978-0-89820-200-7
- Whitburn, Joel (2014), Joel Whitburn's Cash Box Pop Hits 1952-1996, Record Research Inc., ISBN 978-0-89820-209-0
- Wiley, Mason; Bona, Damien (1996), Inside Oscar: The Unofficial History of the Academy Awards, Ballantine Books, ISBN 0345400534
- Wilk, Max (1986), They're Playing Our Song, Da Capo, ISBN 0918432790
