= Broadway (album) =

Studio album by Johnny Mathis
- Released: August 28, 2012
- Recorded: September 24, 1964; October 5, 1964; October 9, 1964
- Genre: Vocal
- Length: 37:31
- Label: Mercury
- Producer: Johnny Mathis

Johnny Mathis chronology
| Olé (1964) | Broadway (album) (2012) | Love Is Everything (1965) |

Broadway is an album by American pop singer Johnny Mathis that was recorded in 1964 but not released by his then record label Mercury Records. The project first became commercially available on August 28, 2012, when Sony Music Entertainment released it as one of two albums on one compact disc, the other album being his 1965 LP Love Is Everything. Broadway was also included in Sony's Mathis box set The Complete Global Albums Collection, which was released on November 17, 2014.

== History ==
After recording 16 studio albums for Columbia Records between 1956 and 1963, Mathis accepted an offer to switch to the Mercury label with one advantage being that he would have more control over his recordings. During the first 15 months at his new home, he recorded and released five LPs and began work on number six, which would be exclusively devoted to songs from musicals from the Great White Way or, as he described it, "things I was listening to because I was in New York. I would go to the theater a lot and listen to all that great music from different shows." The first four of his Mercury titles had respectable chart runs in Billboard, but the most recent of them, Olé was the first not to make the magazine's list of (what was now) the top 150 albums of the week since his 1956 Columbia debut.

In the liner notes for the 2012 release of Broadway, James Ritz describes how "John swings unabashedly and unrelentingly thanks to Allyn Ferguson, who outdid himself with a set of wild and uninhibited arrangements." Mathis has fond memories of the arranger/conductor: "Great stuff... lots of interesting rhythm patterns from Allyn. He was a taskmaster. He was very, very smart and he always put that into his music. He was very esoteric as far as his jazz was concerned. I just sort of tagged along. I enjoyed the challenge and vocally I think it worked. I was quite enamored at the time with Lena Horne and I think a lot of it reflects that." AllMusic reviewer Al Campbell explains, "At the time, Mercury felt the album was too upbeat and not the type of romantic material Mathis had been so successful with during his previous tenure with Columbia."

== Track listing ==
1. "Ain't It de Truth" from Jamaica (Harold Arlen, E.Y. Harburg) – 3:47
2. "Get Out of Town" from Leave It to Me! (Cole Porter) – 3:16
3. "Independent (On My Own)" from Bells Are Ringing (Betty Comden, Adolph Green, Jule Styne) – 2:54
4. "Hello, Dolly!" from Hello, Dolly! (Jerry Herman) – 3:28
5. "Manhattan" from The Garrick Gaieties (Lorenz Hart, Richard Rodgers) – 3:40
6. "Once in a Lifetime" from Stop the World – I Want to Get Off (Leslie Bricusse, Anthony Newley) – 2:22
7. "You'd Better Love Me" from High Spirits (Timothy Gray, Hugh Martin) – 3:13
8. "Don't Rain on My Parade" from Funny Girl (Bob Merrill, Jule Styne) – 2:55
9. "Of Thee I Sing" from Of Thee I Sing (George Gershwin, Ira Gershwin) – 3:12
10. "When I'm Not Near the Girl I Love" from Finian's Rainbow (E.Y. Harburg, Burton Lane) – 2:49
11. "Ridin' High" from Red, Hot and Blue (Cole Porter) – 3:19
12. "She Loves Me" from She Loves Me (Jerry Bock, Sheldon Harnick) – 2:44

== Recording dates ==
- September 24, 1964 – "Don't Rain on My Parade", "Hello, Dolly!", "Independent (On My Own)", "Once in a Lifetime"
- October 5, 1964 – "Ain't It De Truth", "Get Out of Town", "Ridin' High", "When I'm Not Near the Girl I Love"
- October 9, 1964 – "Manhattan", "Of Thee I Sing", "She Loves Me", "You'd Better Love Me"

== Personnel ==
Original album

- Johnny Mathis – vocals; producer
- Allyn Ferguson – arranger, conductor

Love Is Everything/Broadway (2012)

- Mark Wilder – remastering
- Maria Triana – remastering assistant
- Matt Cavaluzzo – analog-to-digital transfers
- Tom D. Kline – design
- James Ritz – liner notes
- Didier C. Deutsch – Sony A&R producer
- Henry Towns – Sony A&R producer
- Shane Harris – Sony A&R coordinator
- Phil Zaks – Sony production coordinator

- Remastered at Battery Studios, New York City
