= Live by Request: Johnny Mathis =

- DVD cover
- Genre: Vocal
- Written by: Jodi Hurwitz; Andy Kadison; Mark McEwen
- Directed by: Lawrence Jordan
- Presented by: Mark McEwen
- Starring: Johnny Mathis; Deniece Williams
- Country of origin: United States
- Original language: English

Production
- Executive producer: Jodi Hurwitz
- Producers: Mitch Maketansky; Allen Kelman
- Production locations: Sony Music Studios, New York City
- Running time: 90 minutes

Original release
- Network: A&E Network
- Release: May 28, 1998

Live by Request: Johnny Mathis is a live television concert by American pop singer Johnny Mathis that aired on May 28, 1998, on the A&E Network as part of its Live by Request series. According to the television industry magazine Broadcasting & Cable, the network "recorded its best ratings ever--a 2.3 rating/1.6 million homes according to Nielsen Media Research"—for the broadcast.

The set included "Why Did I Choose You", a song from the 1965 Broadway musical version of The Yearling that has never appeared on a Mathis album. Another rarity in the show is "Brazil (Aquarela do Brasil)", which made its first appearance as a Mathis recording on his Ultimate Hits Collection compilation that was released just five weeks earlier, on April 21.

The concert was released on DVD on December 18, 2001.

== DVD track listing ==
1. Program Start
2. "Wonderful! Wonderful!" (Sherman Edwards, Ben Raleigh)
3. "Chances Are" (Robert Allen, Al Stillman)
4. "I'm Coming Home" (Thom Bell, Linda Creed)
5. "Misty" (Johnny Burke, Erroll Garner)
6. "A Certain Smile" (Sammy Fain, Paul Francis Webster)
7. "Moment to Moment" (Henry Mancini, Johnny Mercer)
8. "It's Not for Me to Say" (Robert Allen, Al Stillman)
9. "Stranger in Paradise" (Alexander Borodin, Robert Wright, George Forrest)
10. "The Twelfth of Never" (Jerry Livingston, Paul Francis Webster)
11. "Too Much, Too Little, Too Late" performed with Deniece Williams (Nat Kipner, John Vallins)
12. "You Make Me Feel Brand New" (Thom Bell, Linda Creed)
13. "Why Did I Choose You" (Michael Leonard, Herbert Martin)
14. "To the Ends of the Earth" (Joe Sherman, Noel Sherman)
15. "Wild Is the Wind" (Dimitri Tiomkin, Ned Washington)
16. "99 Miles from L.A." (Hal David, Albert Hammond)
17. "How Do You Keep the Music Playing?" (Alan and Marilyn Bergman, Michel Legrand)
18. "Brazil (Aquarela do Brasil)" (Ary Barroso, Bob Russell)
19. Credits
