= Love Theme from "Romeo and Juliet" (A Time for Us) =

Studio album by Johnny Mathis
- Released: July 30, 1969
- Recorded: January 18, 1969; June 5, 1969; June 10, 1969; June 13, 1969
- Genres: Vocal; pop/rock
- Length: 33:40
- Label: Columbia
- Producers: Jack Gold; Robert Mersey

Johnny Mathis chronology
The Impossible Dream (1969)	Love Theme from "Romeo and Juliet" (A Time for Us) (1969)	Give Me Your Love for Christmas (1969)

Singles from Love Theme from "Romeo and Juliet" (A Time for Us)
- 1. "I'll Never Fall in Love Again" Released: April 8, 1969; 2. "Love Theme from Romeo and Juliet" Released: June 18, 1969

Love Theme from "Romeo and Juliet" (A Time for Us) is an album by American pop singer Johnny Mathis that was released on July 30, 1969, by Columbia Records. Of its 11 tracks, eight had been hits for other performers earlier that year, and one of the remaining three, "I'll Never Fall in Love Again", would become a huge success for Dionne Warwick several months later.

The Mathis recording of "I'll Never Fall in Love Again" made its first appearance on Billboard magazine's list of the 40 most popular Easy Listening songs in the US in the issue dated May 17, 1969, and peaked at number 35 during its three weeks there. The title track from the album debuted on that same chart two months later, in the July 5 issue, and got as high as number eight over the course of 13 weeks. It also had a three-week run on the Billboard Hot 100 that began in the July 26 issue and took it to number 96. spent a week at number 100 on the Cashbox singles.The first of the album's 24 consecutive weekly appearances on the magazine's Top LP's chart came two months later, in the September 20 issue, and led to a number 52 showing. On the Cash Box albums chart, it made its debut in the issue dated September 6, 1969, and remained on the chart for 24 weeks, peaking at number 39.

Love Theme from "Romeo and Juliet" (A Time for Us) was released for the first time on compact disc on June 9, 2009, as one of two albums on one CD, the other LP being the previous studio effort by Mathis, Those Were the Days. Love Theme from "Romeo And Juliet" (A Time for Us) was also included in Legacy's Mathis box set The Voice of Romance: The Columbia Original Album Collection, which was released on December 8, 2017.

== Reception ==
Professional ratings
Review scores
Source	Rating
Billboard	positive
The Encyclopedia of Popular Music	3/5 stars

Billboard wrote, "Mathis is in top form in this latest LP outing as he offers his own special interpretations of some of today's biggest hits."

Cashbox reviewed the album, writing "The title tune, a turntable favorite, leads off a vibrant, exciting set highlighted by brilliant renditions of 'Without Her'. 'Didn't We', and 'Windmills Of Your Mind'.'

Record World notes Mathis "voice sounds marvelous on "I'll Never Fall in Love Again," "Without Her," "Love Theme from 'Romeo and Juliet'," "Yesterday When I Was Young."

American Record Guide referred to it as "one of his very best recordings" and notes that 'Erine Freeman's orchestrations are exceptional." The Encyclopedia of Popular Music gave the album a three-star ratings.

== Track listing ==
=== Side one ===
1. "Love Theme from "Romeo and Juliet" (A Time for Us)" from Romeo and Juliet (Larry Kusik, Nino Rota, Eddie Snyder) – 2:58
2. "Aquarius/Let the Sunshine In" from Hair (Galt MacDermot, Gerome Ragni) – 3:04
3. "Without Her" (Harry Nilsson) – 3:01
4. "I'll Never Fall in Love Again" from Promises, Promises (Burt Bacharach, Hal David) – 3:02
5. "Live for Life" from Live for Life (Norman Gimbel, Francis Lai) – 2:59
6. "We" from Me, Natalie (Henry Mancini, Rod McKuen) – 3:03

=== Side two ===
1. "Didn't We" (Jimmy Webb) – 2:49
2. "Love Me Tonight" (Barry Mason, Daniele Pace, Mario Panzeri, Lorenzo Pilat) – 2:58
3. "The Windmills of Your Mind" from The Thomas Crown Affair (Alan and Marilyn Bergman, Michel Legrand) – 3:33
4. "The World I Threw Away" (Harry Greenfield, Neil Sedaka) – 3:18
5. "Yesterday When I Was Young" (Charles Aznavour, Herbert Kretzmer) – 2:55

=== 2017 CD bonus tracks ===
This album's CD release as part of the 2017 box set The Voice of Romance: The Columbia Original Album Collection included a bonus track that was previously unavailable:

- "The Way of Love" (Jack Dieval, Al Stillman) – 2:51

== Recording dates ==
From the liner notes for The Voice of Romance: The Columbia Original Album Collection:

- January 18, 1969 – "I'll Never Fall in Love Again"
- June 5, 1969 – "Love Theme from "Romeo and Juliet" (A Time for Us)", "The World I Threw Away"
- June 10, 1969 – "Aquarius/Let the Sunshine In", "Didn't We", "Love Me Tonight", "Without Her"
- June 13, 1969 – "Live for Life", "We", "The Windmills of Your Mind", "Yesterday When I Was Young"

== Personnel ==
- Johnny Mathis – vocals
- Jack Gold – producer (except as noted)
- Ernie Freeman – arranger and conductor (except as noted)
- Robert Mersey – producer and arranger ("I'll Never Fall in Love Again")
- Phil Macy – engineer
- Ivan Nagy – photography

== Bibliography ==
- Whitburn, Joel (2007), Joel Whitburn Presents Billboard Top Adult Songs, 1961-2006, Record Research Inc., ISBN 0898201691
- Whitburn, Joel (2009), Joel Whitburn's Top Pop Singles, 1955-2008, Record Research Inc., ISBN 0898201802
- Whitburn, Joel (2010), Joel Whitburn Presents Top Pop Albums, Seventh Edition, Record Research Inc., ISBN 0-89820-183-7
- Larkin, Colin (2007), The Encyclopedia of Popular Music, Omnibus Press, ISBN 9-7818-4609-8567
- Hoffmann, Frank W (1988), The Cash box album charts, 1955-1974, Scarecrow Press, ISBN 0-810-82005-6
- Downey, Pat (1994), Cash box pop singles charts, 1950-1993, Libraries Unlimited, ISBN 1-56308-316-7
