= This Is Love (Johnny Mathis album) =

Studio album by Johnny Mathis
- Released: September 18, 1964
- Recorded: March 12, 17, 19, 1964
- Studio: United, Hollywood
- Genre: Vocal, pop rock
- Length: 42:57
- Label: Mercury
- Producer: Johnny Mathis

Johnny Mathis chronology
The Great Years (1964)	This Is Love (1964)	Olé (1965)

Professional ratings
Review scores
Source	Rating
Billboard	positive
The Encyclopedia of Popular Music	3/5 stars

This Is Love is an album by American pop singer Johnny Mathis, released by Mercury Records on September 18, 1964. The album includes three covers of Nat King Cole recordings ("The Touch of Your Lips" and "Poinciana (Song of the Tree)", from the Cole album The Touch of Your Lips, and "The End of a Love Affair", from Cole's album Where Did Everyone Go?) as well as two more songs from "Fly Me to the Moon" composer Bart Howard.

This Is Love made its first appearance on Billboard magazine's Top LP's chart in the issue dated October 17, 1964, and reached number 40 over the course of 20 weeks. It debuted on the Cash Box albums chart in the issue dated October 10, 1964, and remained on the chart for the total of 24 weeks, peaking at number 30.

In 1974, eight songs from this album were reissued on Mathis's Columbia Records release What'll I Do, which coincided with the inclusion of the title song by Irving Berlin that year in the film The Great Gatsby. The Mathis recording of "What'll I Do" originally appeared on 1957's Warm and was the only track on the 1974 release that was not from this Mathis LP.

This Is Love was reissued on compact disc for the first time on November 16, 2012, as one of two albums on one CD, the other album being the follow-up, Olé, originally released in autumn 1964. Both LPs were also included in Sony's Mathis box set The Complete Global Albums Collection, released on November 17, 2014.

== Track listing ==
=== Side one ===
1. "Put On a Happy Face" from Bye Bye Birdie (Charles Strouse, Lee Adams) – 3:15
2. "Poinciana (Song of the Tree)" (Buddy Bernier, Nat Simon) – 4:07
3. "The Touch of Your Lips" (Ray Noble) – 3:28
4. "Just Move Along, Meadow Lark" (Eddie Snyder, Paul Vance) – 2:43
5. "Under a Blanket of Blue" (Jerry Livingston, Al J. Neiburg, Marty Symes) – 3:45
6. "Over the Weekend" (John Benson Brooks, Joseph McCarthy) – 3:52

=== Side two ===
1. "More" from Mondo Cane (Norman Newell, Nino Oliviero, Riz Ortolani) – 2:56
2. "You Love Me" from Tovarich (Anne Crosswell, Lee Pockriss) – 3:47
3. "Limehouse Blues" (Philip Braham, Douglas Furber) – 4:23
4. "What Do You Feel in Your Heart" (Bart Howard) – 3:12
5. "The End of a Love Affair" (Edward Redding) – 3:32
6. "Fantastic" (Bart Howard) – 3:57

== Recording dates ==
From the liner notes of the 2012 CD release:

- March 12, 1964: "Limehouse Blues", "More", "Poinciana (Song of the Tree)"
- March 17, 1964: "The End of a Love Affair", "Over the Weekend", "Put On a Happy Face", "What Do You Feel in Your Heart", "You Love Me"
- March 19, 1964: "Fantastic", "Just Move Along, Meadow Lark", "The Touch of Your Lips", "Under a Blanket of Blue"

== Personnel ==
- Johnny Mathis – vocals; producer; liner notes
- Allyn Ferguson – arranger, supervisor
- Jack Feierman – conductor
- Bill Putnam – recording engineer
- Jim Lockert – recording engineer
- Ralph Cowan – cover portrait

== Bibliography ==
- Whitburn, Joel (2010), Joel Whitburn Presents Top Pop Albums, Seventh Edition, Record Research Inc., ISBN 978-0-89820-183-3
- Hoffmann, Frank W (1988), The Cash box album charts, 1955-1974, Scarecrow Press, ISBN 0-810-82005-6
