= The Shadow of Your Smile (Johnny Mathis album) =

Studio album by Johnny Mathis
- Released: March 1966
- Recorded: August 27, 1965; September 14, 1965; January 12–13, 1966
- Genre: Vocal; pop/rock
- Length: 33:59
- Label: Mercury
- Producer: Don Rieber

Johnny Mathis chronology
The Sweetheart Tree (1965)	The Shadow of Your Smile (1966)	So Nice (1966)

The Shadow of Your Smile is an album by American pop singer Johnny Mathis, released in 1966 by Mercury Records.

The album includes covers of the same two Beatles songs ("Michelle" and "Yesterday") that would be in stores one month later on an Andy Williams album of the same name. Mathis also tackled recent easy listening fare on this album ("A Taste of Honey", "Quiet Nights (Corcovado)") in addition to show tunes from On a Clear Day You Can See Forever and West Side Story.

The Shadow of Your Smile was released on compact disc on November 6, 2012, as one of two albums on one CD, along with his previous LP, The Sweetheart Tree (1965). Both were also included in Sony's Mathis box set The Complete Global Albums Collection, which was released on November 17, 2014.

== History ==
By early 1966, Mathis and fellow easy listening singers like Williams began to feel the effects of the British Invasion. In the liner notes for the 2012 reissue, James Ritz explained:

The Beatles had ushered in the era of the performer-songwriter; therefore, good songs just weren't getting past the artists who were recording them for their own releases. The result was a steady emergence of what in the industry became known as the "cover album", upon which songs that had achieved a certain level of popularity were recorded or "covered" by a number of artists and savored by their loyal fans.

Two of the Beatles' quieter numbers, "Michelle" and "Yesterday", were understandable choices to present to the Mathis audience, but he recalled that it was still not an easy fit: "'I wasn't quite sure how to go about it because their recordings were so minimalist as far as orchestrations and sounded perfect when they did it, but I found it difficult to repeat.'"

It was the Mancini-Mercer tune "Moment to Moment", however, that stayed in the Mathis repertoire through the decades and was even performed for a phone-in fan on the A&E Network's 1998 Mathis concert Live by Request. In 2012, Mathis said, "'I used to perform it constantly, but now by the time I get to the end and some of those high notes, I can hardly pull it off anymore.'"

== Reception ==
Professional ratings
Review scores
Source	Rating
Billboard	positive
The Encyclopedia of Popular Music	3/5 stars
Record Mirror	4/5 stars

=== Commercial ===
The first single from the album, "On a Clear Day (You Can See Forever)", debuted on Billboard magazine's list of the 40 most popular Easy Listening songs in the US a few months before the album's release, in the issue dated November 6, 1965, and made it to number 6 during a 15-week chart run. In the meantime, it also spent two weeks on Billboard's Hot 100 that began in the December 18 issue and included a peak position at number 98. The Shadow of Your Smile had its first appearance on the magazine's Billboard 200 chart in the issue dated April 2, 1966, and began a run of 45 weeks there, where it got as high as number nine. it also debuted on the Cashbox albums chart in the issue dated April 2, 1966, and remained on the chart for 30 weeks, peaking at number 11. This was Mathis' longest album chart run since Johnny's Mood in 1960 and the highest chart position an album of his had achieved since 1960's The Rhythms and Ballads of Broadway.

=== Critical ===
Record World notes Mathis "with the sweetest sounds does a number of up-to-the-minute ballads and beat tunes." Billboard proclaimed, "Another superb Mathis performance to delight his multitude of followers." Cashbox notes "Mathis projects his showmanship by giving each tune heart-warming treatment and individual appeal." Variety notes "Johnny Mathis' high-flying tenor pipes gets an attractive workout in this swell-paced program of film and showtunes and some recent pop hits." American Record Guide said the album features "Burton Lane-Alan J. Lerner songs from On a Clear Day... and some very good arrangements." Disc and Music Echo notes Mathis "is more at home on 'I Left My Heart In San Francisco', and the title song." Record Mirror described the album as "Another beautifully performed set of songs from Johnny." Upon the album's CD release, Stephen Thomas Erlewine of AllMusic wrote, "Not only is The Shadow of Your Smile one of Mathis's most popular records, it's one of his strongest."

== Track listing ==
=== Side one ===
1. "Moment to Moment" from Moment to Moment (Henry Mancini, Johnny Mercer) – 2:23
2. "The Shadow of Your Smile" from The Sandpiper (Johnny Mandel, Paul Francis Webster) – 3:03
3. "Michelle" (John Lennon, Paul McCartney) – 2:33
4. "Yesterday" (Lennon, McCartney) – 3:04
5. "Something's Coming" from West Side Story (Leonard Bernstein, Stephen Sondheim) – 2:50
6. "A Taste of Honey" (Rick Marlow, Bobby Scott) – 3:09

=== Side two ===
1. "I'm in Love for the Very First Time" from An Alligator Named Daisy (Paddy Roberts, Jack Woodman) – 3:15
2. "Quiet Nights (Corcovado)" (Antonio Carlos Jobim, Gene Lees) – 2:26
3. "(I Left My Heart) In San Francisco" (George Cory, Douglass Cross) – 2:59
4. "On a Clear Day (You Can See Forever)" from On a Clear Day You Can See Forever (Alan Jay Lerner, Burton Lane) – 2:43
5. "Melinda" from On a Clear Day You Can See Forever (Lerner, Lane) – 3:18
6. "Come Back to Me" from On a Clear Day You Can See Forever (Lerner, Lane) – 2:16

== Charts ==
Chart (1966)	Peak position
US Top LPs (Billboard)	9
US Cash Box	11

== Recording dates ==
From the liner notes for The Complete Global Albums Collection:

- August 27, 1965: "Come Back to Me", "On a Clear Day (You Can See Forever)"
- September 14, 1965: "Melinda"
- January 12, 1966: "Michelle", "Moment to Moment", "The Shadow of Your Smile", "A Taste of Honey"
- January 13, 1966: "(I Left My Heart) In San Francisco", "I'm in Love for the Very First Time", "Quiet Nights (Corcovado)", "Something's Coming", "Yesterday"

== Personnel ==
- Johnny Mathis – vocals

Technical

- Don Rieber – producer^{[A]}
- Jack Elliott – arranger, conductor ("Moment to Moment", "The Shadow of Your Smile")
- Bryan Fahey – conductor ("Something's Coming")
- Tony Osborne – arranger, conductor ("(I Left My Heart) In San Francisco", "I'm in Love for the Very First Time"); arranger ("Something's Coming")
- Glenn Osser – arranger, conductor ("Come Back to Me", "Melinda", "On a Clear Day You Can See Forever", "Quiet Nights (Corcovado)", "Yesterday")
- John Pisano – arranger, conductor ("Michelle", "A Taste of Honey")
- Johnny Mathis – liner notes
- ^{A} There were no production credits on the original album jacket, but Rieber is credited as producer in the liner notes of both its CD debut and The Complete Global Albums Collection.

== Bibliography ==
- Whitburn, Joel (2007). Joel Whitburn Presents Billboard Top Adult Songs, 1961-2006. Record Research Inc. ISBN 978-0898201697.
- Whitburn, Joel (2009). Joel Whitburn's Top Pop Singles, 1955-2008. Record Research Inc. ISBN 978-0898201802.
- Whitburn, Joel (2010). Joel Whitburn Presents Top Pop Albums, Seventh Edition. Record Research Inc. ISBN 978-0-89820-183-3.
- Hoffmann, Frank K (1988). The Cash box album charts, 1955-1974. Scarecrow Press. ISBN 0-8108-2005-6.
