= Bye Bye Barbara =

- US 7-inch single

Single by Johnny Mathis
- B-side: "A Great Night for Crying"
- Released: 1964
- Recorded: July 15, 1963
- Genre: Pop
- Length: 2:34
- Label: Mercury
- Songwriters: Jack Segal; Paul Vance

Johnny Mathis singles chronology
"The Little Drummer Boy" (1963)	"Bye Bye Barbara" (1964)	"The Fall of Love" (1964)

Music video
- "Bye Bye Barbara" on YouTube

"Bye Bye Barbara" is a popular song written by Jack Segal and Paul Vance that was recorded by Johnny Mathis in 1963. It charted in 1964.

== Recording ==
Johnny Mathis recorded "Bye Bye Barbara" on July 15, 1963, with an orchestra conducted by arranger Don Costa. The only production credit provided on the original 7-inch single reads, "Vocal A Global Records Production". When Mathis signed with Mercury Records in 1963, Global Records was the imprint created for him to record under.

== Chart performance ==
"Bye Bye Barbara" debuted on the Billboard Hot 100 in the issue of the magazine dated February 1, 1964, and peaked at number 53 five weeks later, in the March 7 issue. The song stayed on the chart for seven weeks. It spent three weeks on the magazine's Easy Listening chart and got as high as number 17. It reached number 55 on Cash Box magazine's best seller list and number 46 on the Top 100 Pop Sales and Performance chart in Music Vendor magazine.

== Critical reception ==
In their review column, the editors of Cash Box magazine featured the single as a Pick of the Week, which was their equivalent to a letter grade of A for both "Bye Bye Barbara" and its B-side, "A Great Night for Crying". They described "Bye Bye Barbara" as "a beautiful, tear-compelling romancer with a soft, folk-like quality" and wrote, "Superb Don Costa arrangement."

== Charts ==
Weekly chart performance for "Bye Bye Barbara"
Chart (1964)	Peak position
US Billboard Easy Listening	17
US Billboard Hot 100	53
US Top 100 Best Selling Tunes on Records (Cash Box)	55
US Top 100 Pop Sales and Performance (Music Vendor)	46

== Bibliography ==
- Whitburn, Joel (2012), Joel Whitburn's Hit Records 1954-1982, Record Research Inc., ISBN 978-0-89820-200-7
- Whitburn, Joel (2014), Joel Whitburn's Cash Box Pop Hits 1952-1996, Record Research Inc., ISBN 978-0-89820-209-0
