= Taste of Tears =

- US 7-inch single

Single by Johnny Mathis
- B-side: "White Roses from a Blue Valentine"
- Released: 1964
- Recorded: March 18, 1964
- Genre: Pop
- Length: 2:46
- Label: Mercury
- Songwriters: Teddy Bart; Paul Wyatt

Johnny Mathis singles chronology
"The Fall of Love" (1964)	"Taste of Tears" (1964)	"Listen Lonely Girl" (1964)

Music video
- "Taste of Tears" on YouTube

"Taste of Tears" is a popular song written by Teddy Bart and Paul Wyatt that was recorded by Johnny Mathis in 1964. It charted that same year.

== Recording ==
Johnny Mathis recorded "Taste of Tears" on March 18, 1964, with an orchestra conducted by Jack Feierman. The name of a producer was not listed in the credits provided on the original 7-inch single, which read, "Vocal Conducted by Jack Feierman – A Global Records Production". When Mathis signed with Mercury Records in 1963, Global Records was the imprint created for him to record under.

== Chart performance ==
"Taste of Tears" debuted on the Billboard Hot 100 in the issue of the magazine dated June 20, 1964, and peaked at number 87 two weeks later, the week ending July 4. It spent three weeks on the chart. It reached number 25 on Cash Box magazine's Looking Ahead chart, which was described as a "compilation, in order of strength, of up and coming records showing signs of breaking into The Cash Box Top 100".

== Critical reception ==
In their review column, the editors of Cash Box magazine featured the single as a Pick of the Week, which was their equivalent to a letter grade of A for both "Taste of Tears" and its B-side, "White Roses from a Blue Valentine". They wrote, "Side to eye is the heartfelt ballad 'Taste Of Tears' that the velvety-voiced performer carves out in ear-arresting style. Grade 'A' arranging-ork credits belong to Don Costa." The editors of Billboard wrote, "Warm and interesting ballad sung to full string backing in Johnny's usual dulcet tones."

== Charts ==
Weekly chart performance for "Taste of Tears"
Chart (1964)	Peak position
US Billboard Hot 100	87
US Looking Ahead (Cash Box)	25
