= Barbara McNair =

American singer and actress (1934–2007)

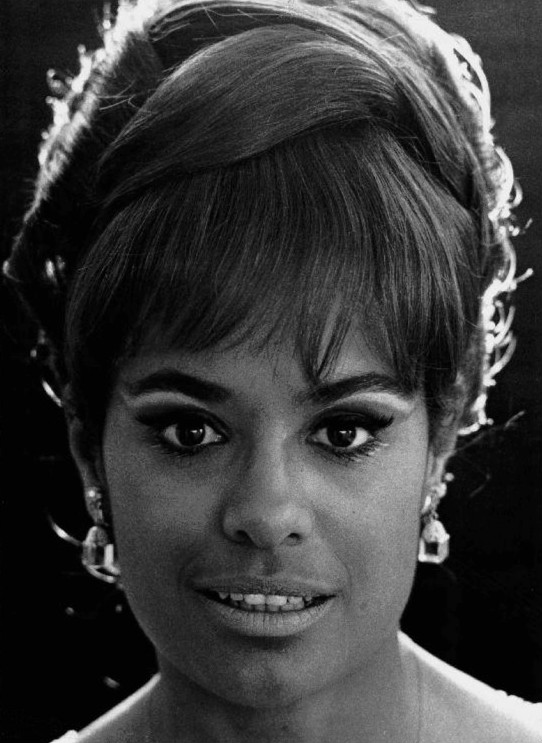
- McNair in 1967
- Born: Barbara Jean McNair; March 4, 1934; Chicago, Illinois, U.S.
- Died: February 4, 2007 (aged 72); Los Angeles, California, U.S.
- Education: UCLA (attended); American Conservatory of Music
- Occupations: Singer; actress
- Years active: 1956–2007
- Spouses: Earl Wright (m. 1953; div. 1955) Jack Rafferty (m. 1963; div. 1971) Rick Manzie (m. 1972; died 1976) Ben Strahan (m. 1979; div. 1986) Charles Blecka (m. 2006)
- Relatives: Curtis Knight (cousin)
- Musical career
- Genres: Pop; R&B; soul; jazz; adult contemporary
- Instrument: Vocals
- Labels: Coral; Signature; TEC Recording Studios; Motown
- Website: barbaramcnair.com

Barbara Jean McNair (March 4, 1934 – February 4, 2007) was an American singer and actress who performed in theater, television, and film. McNair's career spanned over five decades in television, film, and stage. McNair's professional career began in music during the late 1950s, singing in the nightclub circuit. In 1958, McNair released "Till There Was You", her debut single for Coral Records, which was a commercial success. McNair performed all around the world, touring with Nat King Cole and later appearing in his Broadway stage shows I'm with You and The Merry World of Nat King Cole in the early 1960s.

By the 1970s, McNair had switched to acting in films and television; she played Sidney Poitier's character’s wife in They Call Me Mister Tibbs! (1970) and its sequel The Organization (1971). In her later years, McNair returned to performing in nightclubs and on cruise ships. She died of throat cancer on February 4, 2007, at the age of 72.

== Biography ==
=== Early life and education ===
With her parents' encouragement, McNair began singing in school productions and during church services. McNair attended Washington Park High School, graduating in 1952.

After high school, McNair studied music at the American Conservatory of Music in Chicago. She also briefly attended UCLA because she had been raised to believe that whatever people planned to do with their lives they had to go to college to learn how to do it. She dropped college after one year when she felt it had nothing to do with what she wanted to accomplish.

=== Career ===
In 1969 she launched The Barbara McNair Show, a syndicated television variety show, one of the first variety shows hosted by a Black woman. That summer, the show shifted production to Toronto, Canada. The show continued to run to 1971, airing the show on the CTV network.

In the late 1970s, McNair was one of the original members of the "Four Girls Four" act, along with Rose Marie, Rosemary Clooney, and Margaret Whiting. She was quickly replaced by Helen O'Connell, however, as she was deemed too young to fit in with the rest of the group.

== Personal life ==
McNair was married five times and had no children. McNair's first husband was Earl Wright, to whom she was married from 1953 until 1955. From 1963 until 1971, McNair was married to Jack Rafferty. In August 1972, she married Rick Manzie, whom she had met in 1965 during a separation period from Rafferty (McNair remained married to Rafferty as he helped co-produce The Barbara McNair Show along with Rick Manzie, who lived with Barbara in their Las Vegas home at 4265 South Bruce St. McNair and Manzie remained married until his murder in December 1976. Three years after Manzie's death, McNair married Ben Strahan in 1979 in Las Vegas. McNair and Strahan divorced in 1987. Her last marriage was to Charles Blecka in 2006, to whom she was married at the time of her death.

McNair was a cousin of musician Curtis Knight.

=== 1972 arrest and Manzie's Murder ===
In October 1972, McNair was arrested for possession of heroin at the Playboy Club in New Jersey. . The charges stemmed from McNair’s signing for a package delivered to her home that contained drugs. McNair stated she had had no knowledge of the contents of the package nor who had sent it. McNair's then-husband Rick Manzie was later charged in connection to the drugs, but charges against McNair were dropped in April 1973.

On December 15, 1976, Manzie was murdered in their Las Vegas mansion. No one was ever arrested or charged for the crime, but police suspected a connection to the American Mafia given Manzie's known ties to organized crime figures in the Chicago Outfit. Mafia boss-turned-FBI-informant Jimmy Fratianno later claimed in his book The Last Mafioso that Manzie had been a Mafia associate and had tried to put out a contract on a mob-associated tax attorney with whom he had had a legal dispute.

== Bankruptcy, later years, and death ==
McNair filed for bankruptcy in September 1987, with debts totaling $458,399 ($1.3 million today). Into her 70s, she resided in the Los Angeles area, playing tennis and skiing to keep in shape, and touring on occasion.

She died on February 4, 2007, in Los Angeles, after a seven-year battle with throat cancer.

== Filmography ==
- Spencer's Mountain (1963) as Graduation Singer (uncredited)
- If He Hollers, Let Him Go! (1968) as Lily
- Stiletto (1969) as Ahn Dessie
- Venus in Furs (1969) as Rita
- The Lonely Profession (1969) as Donna Travers
- Change of Habit (1969) as Sister Irene
- They Call Me Mister Tibbs! (1970) as Valerie Tibbs
- The Organization (1971) as Valerie Tibbs
- Fatal Charm (1990) as English Teacher
- Neon Signs (1996) as Grace

=== Television ===
- The Eleventh Hour (1964) as Sarah Packsey
- Dr. Kildare (1964) as Mareema Kamba
- I Spy (1967) as Leona
- Hogan's Heroes (1967) as Carol Dukes/Kumasa
- The Barbara McNair Show (1969-1971) star of show
- McMillan & Wife (1972) as Lee Richards
- The Mod Squad (1972) as Amanda
- Mission Impossible (1973) as Jena Cole

== Discography ==
=== Albums ===
- Front Row Center (Coral CRL57209, 1959)
- Love Talk (Signature SM 1042, 1960)
- The Livin' End (Warner WS 1570, 1964)
- I Enjoy Being a Girl (Warner WS 1541, 1964)
- Here I Am (Motown MS-644, November 1966)
- The Real Barbara McNair (Motown MS-680, April 1969)
- More Today Than Yesterday (Audio Fidelity – AFSD 6222, 1969) ("After St. Francis" was No. 93 in Canada)
- Here's to Life (TECaid, 2006)
