= The Fall of Love =

- US 7-inch single

Single by Johnny Mathis
- B-side: "No More"
- Released: 1964
- Recorded: March 18, 1964
- Genre: Pop
- Length: 3:00
- Label: Mercury
- Songwriters: Dimitri Tiomkin; Ned Washington

Johnny Mathis singles chronology
"Bye Bye Barbara" (1964)	"The Fall of Love" (1964)	"Taste of Tears" (1964)

Music video
- "The Fall of Love" on YouTube

"The Fall of Love" is a popular song written by Dimitri Tiomkin and Ned Washington for the 1964 film The Fall of the Roman Empire. It was recorded by Johnny Mathis and released that same year. It charted briefly.

== Recording ==
Johnny Mathis recorded "The Fall of Love" on March 18, 1964, with an orchestra conducted by Jack Feierman. The name of a producer was not listed in the credits provided on the original 7-inch single, which read, "Vocal Conducted by Jack Feierman – A Don Costa Arrangement – A Global Records Production". When Mathis signed with Mercury Records in 1963, Global Records was the imprint created for him to record under.

== Chart performance ==
"The Fall of Love" "bubbled under" Billboard magazine's Hot 100 for one week at number 120 in the issue dated April 18, 1964. It reached number 14 on Cash Box magazine's Looking Ahead chart, which was described as a "compilation, in order of strength, of up and coming records showing signs of breaking into The Cash Box Top 100". On the Top 100 Pop Sales and Performance chart in Music Vendor magazine, it peaked at number 96.

== Critical reception ==
In their review column, the editors of Cash Box magazine featured the single as a Pick of the Week, which was their equivalent to a letter grade of A for both "The Fall of Love" and its B-side, "No More". Regarding "The Fall of Love", they wrote, "The songster's feelingful delivery coupled with a strong lyric and a top-drawer Don Costa arrangement sets this one up for a quick chart appearance."

== Charts ==
Weekly chart performance for "The Fall of Love"
Chart (1964)	Peak position
US Bubbling Under the Hot 100 (Billboard)	120
US Looking Ahead (Cash Box)	14
US Top 100 Pop Sales and Performance (Music Vendor)	96

== Bibliography ==
- Whitburn, Joel (2009), Joel Whitburn's Top Pop Singles, 1955-2008, Record Research Inc., ISBN 0898201802
- Whitburn, Joel (2012), Joel Whitburn's Hit Records 1954-1982, Record Research Inc., ISBN 978-0-89820-200-7
