= On a Clear Day (You Can See Forever) =

Song from the 1965 musical "On a Clear Day You Can See Forever"

- Original sheet music cover

Song
- Published: 1965
- Composer: Burton Lane
- Lyricist: Alan Jay Lerner

"On a Clear Day (You Can See Forever)" is a song composed by Burton Lane with lyrics by Alan Jay Lerner for the 1965 Broadway musical On a Clear Day You Can See Forever. It became a chart hit that year for Robert Goulet and Johnny Mathis and has been covered by many singers and musicians since then. Barbra Streisand performed it in the 1970 film adaptation of the musical and in many concerts afterward.

== Background and composition ==
Alan Jay Lerner already had a strong interest in reincarnation when a radio talk show discussion on parapsychology inspired the storyline for On a Clear Day You Can See Forever: a young woman with ESP tells of a previous life while being hypnotized by a doctor who then falls in love with the woman she used to be. In his book The Wordsmiths, biographer Stephen Citron explained that Burton Lane had agreed to compose the music for the project but had reservations about the title:

Beyond its being a take-off on the then hip phrase that California real estate agents used to swindle prospective homeowners when trying to sell beachfront property near smogridden Los Angeles—"On a clear day you can see Catalina"—Lane conceded that he didn't know what connection with the paranormal the phrase had.

Lane wrote the music with the idea that the full title of the song should only be revealed at the end. Citron described Lerner's difficulty with completing the lyrics:

Lerner swore he spent three hours every morning, seven days a week working on this lyric. It became his bête noire, and his quest for the perfect lyric was to continue for eight months while he wrote ninety-one complete versions—eight of which he showed to Lane.

According to the sheet music published by the Warner Music Group, "On a Clear Day (You Can See Forever)" is written in the key of E major with a moderately fast beat consisting of 126 beats per minute. Accompanied by the instrumentation of a piano, the vocals range from G_{3} to D_{5}.

== In the musical ==
In the stage musical, the song is first sung solely by the doctor, Mark Bruckner. Lerner wanted Louis Jourdan for the role and felt he had the charm he saw in Bruckner, but Lane told Lerner, "Charm won't help him sing the songs." Jourdan took voice lessons for the role since he was not a trained singer. But Lane was concerned about his ability to handle the music; on two occasions before the show's Boston tryout, he specifically mentioned the title song as the litmus test for measuring how suitable he was for the role. Jourdan played Bruckner at the Boston tryout on September 7, 1965. Afterward, Lane was certain he wanted to replace him.

"On a Clear Day (You Can See Forever)" is sung in the middle of the first act by Dr. Bruckner, who was played by John Cullum once it opened on Broadway in October 1965. The song is reprised for the finale at the end of the second act. When the musical was made into a 1970 film of the same name, a chorus sang the song over the opening credits without the opening verse. The full song is sung for the first time as the finale by Bruckner (played by Yves Montand) to his patient, Daisy Gamble (played by Barbra Streisand), who then reprises the chorus to close the film.

"On a Clear Day (You Can See Forever)"
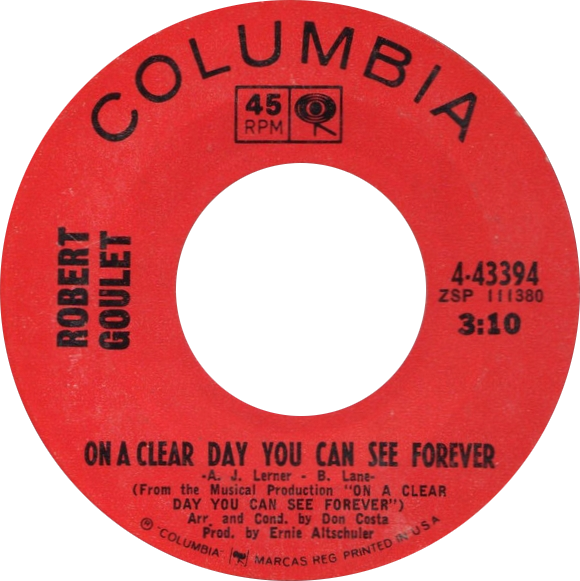
- US 7-inch single

Single by Robert Goulet

from the album On Broadway
- Released: 1965
- Recorded: 1965
- Genre: Pop
- Length: 3:10
- Label: Columbia
- Songwriters: Burton Lane; Alan Jay Lerner
- Producer: Ernie Altschuler

Robert Goulet singles chronology
| "Summer Sounds" (1965) | "Come Back to Me, My Love" / "On a Clear Day (You Can See Forever)" (1965) | "Everlasting" (1965) |

Music video
- "On a Clear Day" on YouTube "On a Clear Day" (live, The Ed Sullivan Show, 1965) on YouTube

== Robert Goulet version ==
The first recording of "On a Clear Day (You Can See Forever)" to reach the record charts was by Robert Goulet and an orchestra conducted by arranger Don Costa. It was produced by Ernie Altschuler, and for the 7-inch single, it was paired with a song titled "Come Back to Me, My Love", which is not to be confused with another song from the musical titled "Come Back to Me".

=== Chart performance ===
Goulet's recording of "On a Clear Day (You Can See Forever)" "bubbled under" Billboard magazine's Hot 100 for two weeks in October 1965, during which time it peaked at number 119. On their Easy Listening chart it got as high as number 13. It reached number 7 on Cash Box magazine's Looking Ahead chart, which was described as a "compilation, in order of strength, of up and coming records showing signs of breaking into The Cash Box Top 100".

=== Critical reception ===
In their review column, the editors of Cash Box featured the single as a Pick of the Week, which was their equivalent to a letter grade of A for both "On a Clear Day (You Can See Forever)" and "Come Back to Me, My Love". They described Goulet's recording of "On a Clear Day (You Can See Forever)" as "a haunting reading". When it was released on his album On Broadway, they included it as one of the songs on which he "emanates" "[t]he same style that has made him one of the top pop favorites". When On Broadway was reissued in 2000, AllMusic denoted the song as one of the best tracks on the album.

=== Live performance ===
Goulet performed the song on The Ed Sullivan Show on December 5, 1965.

=== Charts ===
Weekly chart performance for "On a Clear Day (You Can See Forever)" by Robert Goulet
| Chart (1965) | Peak position |
|---|---|
| US Billboard Easy Listening | 13 |
| US Bubbling Under the Hot 100 (Billboard) | 119 |
| US Looking Ahead (Cash Box) | 7 |

"On a Clear Day (You Can See Forever)"
- US 7-inch single

Single by Johnny Mathis

from the album The Shadow of Your Smile
- B-side: "Come Back to Me"
- Released: 1965
- Recorded: August 27, 1965
- Genre: Pop
- Length: 2:45
- Label: Mercury
- Songwriters: Burton Lane; Alan Jay Lerner
- Producer: Don Rieber

Johnny Mathis singles chronology
| "The Sweetheart Tree" (1965) | "On a Clear Day (You Can See Forever)" (1965) | "Moment to Moment" (1966) |

Music video
- "On a Clear Day" on YouTube "On a Clear Day" (live, The Ed Sullivan Show, 1965) on YouTube

== Johnny Mathis version ==
Johnny Mathis recorded "On a Clear Day (You Can See Forever)" on August 27, 1965, with an orchestra conducted by Glenn Osser for his album The Shadow of Your Smile. It was produced by Don Rieber and released as a 7-inch single with "Come Back to Me", which he also recorded for the album.

=== Chart performance ===
Mathis's recording of "On a Clear Day (You Can See Forever)" made its first appearance on Billboard's Easy Listening chart in the November 6, 1965, issue and spent 15 weeks there, during which time it got as high as number 6. It debuted on the Billboard Hot 100 six weeks later, in the December 18 issue, and peaked at number 98 during its two weeks on the chart.

=== Critical reception ===
In their review column, the editors of Cash Box magazine featured the single as a Best Bet, which was their equivalent to a letter grade of A for "On a Clear Day (You Can See Forever)". They described Mathis's recording as "top notch" and wrote, "Mathis sings the romantic ballad in his inimitable style." The editors of Billboard wrote in their review of his recording that Mathis was "in top form".

=== Live performance ===
Mathis performed the song on The Ed Sullivan Show on November 21, 1965, as part of a medley with "Come Back to Me" and a third song from the musical, "Melinda".

=== Charts ===
Weekly chart performance for "On a Clear Day (You Can See Forever)" by Johnny Mathis
| Chart (1965) | Peak position |
|---|---|
| US Billboard Easy Listening | 6 |
| US Billboard Hot 100 | 98 |

"On a Clear Day (You Can See Forever)"
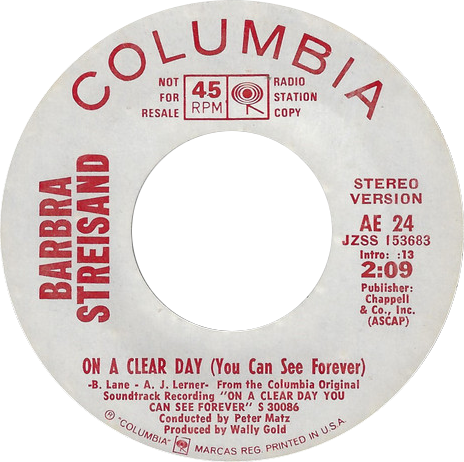
- US promo single of the Streisand studio recording

Promotional single by Barbra Streisand

from the album On a Clear Day You Can See Forever
- Released: July 1970
- Recorded: Early 1970
- Studio: Samuel Goldwyn Studios (West Hollywood, California)
- Length: 2:09
- Label: Columbia
- Songwriters: Burton Lane; Alan Jay Lerner
- Producer: Wally Gold

== Barbra Streisand version ==
Barbra Streisand recorded "On a Clear Day (You Can See Forever)" in early 1970 during production of the film adaptation at Samuel Goldwyn Studios in West Hollywood, California. It was produced by Wally Gold and released as a 7-inch promotional single in July 1970 by Columbia Records. It was also issued commercially as the B-side of Streisand's "Didn't We" single in 1972.

=== Critical reception ===
Streisand's recording of "On a Clear Day (You Can See Forever)" was noted as a highlight on the film's soundtrack. Vincent Canby from The New York Times described the song as "excellent". Although AllMusic's William Ruhlmann was critical of the majority of On a Clear Day You Can See Forever, he complimented Streisand's vocal performance on the title track. The staff at Billboard wrote that her performances of "On a Clear Day (You Can See Forever)", "He Isn't You" and "What Did I Have That I Don't Have" were "worth the price of the album".

=== Live recordings ===
Streisand recorded a live version of the song in 1972, arranged by Peter Matz, which was released that year on her Live Concert at the Forum album. During the "Monologue" track before the song, she dedicated it to Los Angeles. Before the performance included on her 1994 album The Concert, she said:

Another nice thing about growing older is that you finally begin to appreciate yourself—flaws and all—and ... this next song has taken me I don't know how many hours on how many couches to be able to sing and really mean it.

She also performed the song on her 2000 album Timeless: Live in Concert.

== Cover versions ==
Various versions of "On a Clear Day" have been praised by the editors of Cash Box magazine in reviews of the albums or singles on which they appear, three of which were released in 1966. In their review of The Return of David Whitfield, they included the song on a list of the album's "blue-ribbon efforts". Jim Nabors Sings Love Me with All Your Heart included a "sensitive arrangement" of the song. Eddie "Lockjaw" Davis's recording on Lock, the Fox was listed as one of the "top tracks" on the album. Two albums from 1968 included noteworthy renditions. Their review of Johnny Lytle's The Sound of Velvet Soul included it on a list of songs that were "lively interpretations", and on Ed Ames Sings the Hits of Broadway and Hollywood, they wrote, "The chanter's rich, warm tones enrich such outings as … 'On a Clear Day (You Can See Forever)'." Two releases from 1970 also had covers worth mentioning. Regarding Bill Evans's Alone, they wrote, "The sensitivity and depth of the Evans touch is demonstrated on … 'On a Clear Day'." Roger Williams's recording of the song was released as a single, which the editors described as "attractively presented".

Billboard also highlighted recordings of "On a Clear Day" by various artists. The recording on Ferrante and Teicher's 1966 album For Lovers of All Ages was described as "sparkling". In 1967, they appreciated Hank Crawford's work on his Mr. Blues album, on which he changes instruments for a jazz version of the song. The recording on Clare Fischer's Songs for Rainy Day Lovers was "[f]ascinating". The song was included on a list of recordings that "stand up for renewed appreciation" on the 1970 album On a Clear Day Steve Lawrence Sings Up a Storm.

The editors of Record Mirror also mentioned "On a Clear Day" in reviews and other articles. They described the version on Frank Sinatra's 1966 album Strangers in the Night as "good". In a glowing review of Matt Monro's 1966 album This Is the Life!, they wrote, "Hear him move up-tempo on 'On a Clear Day' … It's vocal perfection, that's what it is." In an article on The Peddlers discussing their 1968 album Three in a Cell, the editors described it as one of "the best of the recent pop songs".

AllMusic critics had comments on the song as well. In a retrospective review of Carmen McRae's 1968 concert album Live at Century Plaza, Nathan Southern described "On a Clear Day" as one of the songs that was "brilliantly conceived and executed". In discussing the 1992 album Michael Feinstein Sings the Burton Lane Songbook, Vol. 2, William Ruhlmann called the song "Lane's most famous composition".

== Bibliography ==
- Citron, Stephen (1995), The Wordsmiths: Oscar Hammerstein 2nd and Alan Jay Lerner, Oxford University Press, ISBN 978-0-19-508386-6
- Nickens, Christopher; Swenson, Karen (2000), The Films of Barbra Streisand (illustrated ed.), Citadel Press, ISBN 0806519541
- Shapiro, Doris (1989), We Danced All Night: My Life Behind the Scenes with Alan Jay Lerner, Barricade Books, ISBN 0-688-08937-2
- Suskin, Steven (2009), The Sound of Broadway Music: A Book of Orchestrators and Orchestrations, Oxford University Press, ISBN 978-0-19-530947-8
- Whitburn, Joel (2009), Joel Whitburn's Top Pop Singles, 1955-2008, Record Research Inc., ISBN 978-0-89820-180-2
