= Listen Lonely Girl =

- US 7-inch single

Single by Johnny Mathis
- B-side: "All I Wanted"
- Released: 1964
- Recorded: August 27, 1964
- Genre: Pop
- Length: 2:31
- Label: Mercury
- Songwriters: Richard Ahlert; James Lyons; Robert William Scott

Johnny Mathis singles chronology
| "Taste of Tears" (1964) | "Listen Lonely Girl" (1964) | "Take the Time" (1965) |

Music video
- "Listen Lonely Girl" on YouTube

"Listen Lonely Girl" is a popular song written by Richard Ahlert, James Lyons and Robert William Scott that was recorded by Johnny Mathis in 1964. It charted that same year.

== Recording ==
Johnny Mathis recorded "Listen Lonely Girl" on August 27, 1964, with arranger Claus Ogerman and an orchestra conducted by Quincy Jones. The name of a producer was not listed in the credits provided on the original 7-inch single, which read, "Vocal A Global Records Production". When Mathis signed with Mercury Records in 1963, Global Records was the imprint created for him to record under.

== Chart performance ==
"Listen Lonely Girl" debuted on the Billboard Hot 100 in the issue of the magazine dated October 24, 1964, and peaked at number 62 seven weeks later, in the December 12 issue. The song stayed on the chart for eight weeks. It spent eight weeks on the magazine's Easy Listening chart and got as high as number 11. It reached number 64 on Cash Box magazine's best seller list and number 59 on the Top 100 Pop Sales and Performance chart in Music Vendor magazine.

== Critical reception ==
In their review column, the editors of Cash Box magazine featured the single as their Pick of the Week, which was their equivalent to a letter grade of A for both "Listen Lonely Girl" and its B-side, "All I Wanted". They wrote, "It's a tailored-for-teen-tastes, string-filled cha cha beat romancer … that the songster carves out in ear-arresting fashion." The editors of Billboard wrote, "It's Mathis in top form. Watch the change of style half way through."

== Charts ==
Weekly chart performance for "Listen Lonely Girl"
| Chart (1964) | Peak position |
|---|---|
| US Billboard Easy Listening | 11 |
| US Billboard Hot 100 | 62 |
| US Top 100 Best Selling Tunes on Records (Cash Box) | 64 |
| US Top 100 Pop Sales and Performance (Music Vendor) | 59 |

== Bibliography ==
- Whitburn, Joel (2012), Joel Whitburn's Hit Records 1954-1982, Record Research Inc., ISBN 978-0-89820-200-7
- Whitburn, Joel (2014), Joel Whitburn's Cash Box Pop Hits 1952-1996, Record Research Inc., ISBN 978-0-89820-209-0
