= Take the Time =

- US 7-inch single

Single by Johnny Mathis
- B-side: "Dianacita"
- Released: 1965
- Recorded: April 19, 1965
- Genre: Pop
- Length: 2:52
- Label: Mercury
- Songwriter: Robert Allen
- Producer: Robert Allen

Johnny Mathis singles chronology
"Listen Lonely Girl" (1964)	"Take the Time" (1965)	"The Sweetheart Tree" (1965)

Music video
- "Take the Time" on YouTube

"Take the Time" is a popular song written by Robert Allen that was recorded by Johnny Mathis in 1965. It charted that same year.

== Recording ==
Johnny Mathis recorded "Take the Time" on April 19, 1965, with an orchestra conducted by arranger Glenn Osser. It was produced by its composer, Robert Allen.

== Chart performance ==
"Take the Time" "bubbled under" Billboard magazine's Hot 100 for three weeks in June 1965; it got as high as number 104. It spent four weeks on the magazine's Easy Listening chart and peaked at number 32. It reached number 98 on Cash Box magazine's best seller list and number 82 on the Top 100 Pop Sales and Performance chart in Music Vendor magazine.

== Critical reception ==
In their review column, the editors of Cash Box magazine featured the single as a Pick of the Week, which was their equivalent to a letter grade of A for both "Take the Time" and its B-side, "Dianacita". They described "Take the Time" as "a pretty, slow-moving pledge of romantic devotion in the chanter's while-back simple, heartfelt style." The editors of Billboard described the song as "the type of ballad that zoomed Mathis to fame" and felt that the singer was "in the same top vocal form as the 'Chances Are' days". Aaron Sternfield, a writer for Billboard, said Mathis was "particularly effective" in his performance of the song at the Copa Room. The editors of Record World chose the song as their Sleeper of the Week and described it as "sweet music".

== Charts ==
Weekly chart performance for "Take the Time"
Chart (1965)	Peak position
US Billboard Bubbling Under the Hot 100	104
US Billboard Easy Listening	32
US Top 100 Best Selling Tunes on Records (Cash Box)	98
US Top 100 Pop Sales and Performance (Music Vendor)	82

== Bibliography ==
- Whitburn, Joel (2009), Joel Whitburn's Top Pop Singles, 1955-2008, Record Research Inc., ISBN 978-0898201802
- Whitburn, Joel (2012), Joel Whitburn's Hit Records 1954-1982, Record Research Inc., ISBN 978-0-89820-200-7
- Whitburn, Joel (2014), Joel Whitburn's Cash Box Pop Hits 1952-1996, Record Research Inc., ISBN 978-0-89820-209-0
