= The Ultimate Hits Collection (Johnny Mathis album) =

Compilation album by Johnny Mathis
- Released: April 21, 1998
- Recorded: 1956–1986
- Genres: Vocal; R&B; stage & screen; pop/rock
- Length: 57:18
- Label: Columbia

Johnny Mathis chronology
All About Love (1996)	The Ultimate Hits Collection (1998)	Because You Loved Me: The Songs of Diane Warren (1998)

Professional ratings
Review scores
Source	Rating
Allmusic	5/5 stars
Robert Christgau	A−
The Encyclopedia of Popular Music	3/5 stars

The Ultimate Hits Collection is a compilation album by American pop singer Johnny Mathis that was released in 1998 by Columbia Records. In addition to offering several hit singles, the collection includes the first release of "Brazil (Aquarela do Brasil)", a song that was originally recorded for his 1986 collaboration with Henry Mancini, The Hollywood Musicals, but not included in the final track selection.

== Reception ==
In giving a grade of A− to the compilation, Robert Christgau is especially fond of "Wonderful! Wonderful!", "It's Not for Me to Say", "Chances Are", "The Twelfth of Never", and "Wild Is the Wind", noting that "those five songs are the substance of Mathis's legend and legacy. Poised on the cusp of black and white, masculine and feminine, they projected an image of egoless tenderness, an irresistible breath of sensuality."

In addition to receiving a five-star rating from AllMusic, this release has also been designated by the site as an Album Pick.

== Track listing ==
No.	Title	Writer(s)	Length
1.	"Wonderful! Wonderful!"	Sherman Edwards, Ben Raleigh	2:50
2.	"It's Not for Me to Say"	Robert Allen, Al Stillman	3:05
3.	"When Sunny Gets Blue"	Marvin Fisher, Jack Segal	2:41
4.	"Chances Are"	Robert Allen, Al Stillman	3:03
5.	"The Twelfth of Never"	Jerry Livingston, Paul Francis Webster	2:28
6.	"Wild Is the Wind"	Dimitri Tiomkin, Ned Washington	2:26
7.	"A Certain Smile"	Sammy Fain, Paul Francis Webster	2:47
8.	"Misty"	Johnny Burke, Erroll Garner	3:34
9.	"Maria"	Leonard Bernstein, Stephen Sondheim	3:45
10.	"Stranger in Paradise"	Alexander Borodin, Robert Wright, George Forrest	5:53
11.	"Stardust"	Hoagy Carmichael, Mitchell Parish	3:27
12.	"The Sweetheart Tree"	Henry Mancini, Johnny Mercer	2:11
13.	"Love Theme from Romeo and Juliet (A Time for Us)"	Larry Kusik, Nino Rota, Eddie Snyder	2:58
14.	"I'm Coming Home"	Thom Bell, Linda Creed	3:24
15.	"Too Much, Too Little, Too Late" (performed with Deniece Williams)	Nat Kipner, John Vallins	2:59
16.	"Friends in Love" (performed with Dionne Warwick)	Bill Champlin, David Foster, Jay Graydon	4:03
17.	"Brazil (Aquarela do Brasil)"	Ary Barroso, Bob Russell	4:13
18.	"99 Miles from L.A." (live)	Hal David, Albert Hammond	3:35

== Personnel ==
- Johnny Mathis – vocals

Compilation

- Didier C. Deutsch – producer
- Joanna Ifrah – associate producer
- Joy Gilbert – product manager
- Patti Matheny – A&R coordinator
- Jon Newman – packaging manager
- Tom Ruff – mixing/mastering engineer
- Steve Berkowitz – liner notes
- Will Friedwald – liner notes
- Mixed and mastered at Sony Music Studios, New York
