= Olé (Johnny Mathis album) =

Studio album by Johnny Mathis
- Released: November 1964
- Recorded: March 30, 1964; April 2, 1964; April 9, 1964
- Genre: Vocal
- Length: 32:49
- Label: Mercury
- Producer: Johnny Mathis

Johnny Mathis chronology
This Is Love (1964)	Olé (1964)	Broadway (1964)

Olé is a Latin American album by American pop singer Johnny Mathis that was released by Mercury Records in November 1964 and includes Spanish-language versions of English-language chart hits by Frank Sinatra ("Granada") and Sarah Vaughan ("Serenata") as well as the signature song of the I Love Lucy character Ricky Ricardo that was played by Desi Arnaz ("Babalu").

This album was Mathis's first non-holiday release since his 1956 debut that didn't make an appearance on Billboard magazine's Top LP's chart.

Olé was released for the first time on compact disc on November 16, 2012, as one of two albums on one CD, the other album being the previous Mathis LP, This Is Love. Both were also included in Sony's Mathis box set The Complete Global Albums Collection, which was released on November 17, 2014.

== History ==
Mathis described his degree of interest in this project in the liner notes on the back cover of the original album. "'I love everything about Latin American music: the rhythms, the melodies, the sentiment and the passion. There is no music I would rather listen to – no music I would rather sing.'" In an interview for the 2012 CD release, he recalled this intensity. "'All my enthusiasm came out on this particular album.'"

The interview elicited many anecdotes regarding the selections for this album, including the two songs that originated in Orfeu Negro (Black Orpheus), "Manhã de Carnaval (Morning of the Carnival)" and "Samba de Orfeu". "'I remember I got so excited when a friend of mine took me to see Black Orpheus, whose music was written by Luiz Bonfá. His music just blew me away, and I tried to repeat that wonderful opening with the drums going and the voice over the top. Allyn [Ferguson] did the arrangement, and he just mostly transcribed what we heard on the soundtrack.'" Mathis also recalls a bit of Ferguson's personality in the studio. "'The children on the songs were some of Allyn's children and some from a little grammar school in the [San Fernando] Valley. And Allyn was a tyrant with those kids. They were scared to death of him. But those songs just stay with you forever.'"

Other recollections involve Connie Cox, his voice teacher during his teenage years in San Francisco. "'"Granada" is one of my all-time favorites because at the time I was still under the spell of my voice teacher and wanted to do something for her – all the high notes – and we got them all in.'" Cox introduced her pupil to another selection here: the first three suites of "Bachianas Brasileiras" by Heitor Villa-Lobos. "'That’s a vocal exercise…I used to do with Connie. She never dreamed I would record them, but I did mostly because I was under the influence of Allyn Ferguson, who was a typical jazz guy with everything ad-libbed. And he would go, "No, man…c'mon, let’s do it." That's about the way that came about.'"

A phone interview with WQED-FM's Bryan Sejvar, however, revealed how critical Mathis was of his "Bachianas Brasileiras" recording. When Sejvar said, "You even had some Villa-Lobos on a, uh, Olé album of yours", Mathis chuckles, "Oh-ha-oh, that! Oh, my gosh! I gave it my best shot, but I listen to it once in a while and go, 'Achhh!'" He was kinder to himself in the liner notes of The Complete Global Albums Collection, where he wrote, "If I were to do the piece today, I'd probably rest my voice between the various parts, but when I recorded it that wasn't the case. As a result, it may sound a bit labored, but I'd give myself a C for effort on this selection."

== Reception ==
Professional ratings
Review scores
Source	Rating
Billboard	positive
The Encyclopedia of Popular Music	3/5 stars

Billboard wrote, "He demonstrates tremendous sensitivity and feeling as he sings."

Cashbox described the album as "One of the best albums that [Mathis] has cut in quite a while."

== Track listing ==
=== Side one ===
1. "Granada" (Agustín Lara) – 3:11
2. "Without You (Tres Palabras)" (Osvaldo Farrés, Ray Gilbert) – 2:45
3. Medley – 4:20
  a. "Generique" (Antônio Carlos Jobim, Vinicius de Moraes)
  b. "Felicidade" (Antônio Carlos Jobim, Vinicius de Moraes)
4. "Manhã de Carnaval (Morning of the Carnival)" from "Orfeu Negro (Black Orpheus)" (Luiz Bonfá) – 3:12
5. "Samba de Orfeu" from "Orfeu Negro (Black Orpheus)" (Luiz Bonfá, Antônio Maria) – 2:23

=== Side two ===
1. "La Montaña" (Augusto Algueró) – 3:35
2. "Babalu" (Margarita Lecuana, Bob Russell) – 2:45
3. "Serenata" (Leroy Anderson, Mitchell Parish) – 3:37
4. "Bachianas Brasileiras, Pts. 1–3" (Heitor Villa-Lobos) – 7:01

== Recording dates ==
- March 30, 1964: "Granada", "La Montaña", "Serenata", "Without You (Tres Palabras)"
- April 2, 1964: "Generique/Felicidade", "Manhã de Carnaval (Morning of the Carnival)", "Samba de Orfeu"
- April 9, 1964: "Babalu", "Bachianas Brasileiras"

== Personnel ==
- Johnny Mathis – vocals; producer; liner notes
- Allyn Ferguson – arranger
- Jack Feierman – conductor
- Ralph Cowan – cover portrait^{[A]}

== Trivia ==
The 1994 Stone Temple Pilots album Purple includes the hidden track "My Second Album", which has the lyric, "This album cover looks similar – like Johnny Mathis". That album cover features a toddler with his arm in the air (like Mathis does on this one) as he's riding a Qilin.

== Bibliography ==
- Whitburn, Joel (2009), Joel Whitburn's Top Pop Singles, 1955-2008, Record Research Inc., ISBN 978-0898201802
- Whitburn, Joel (2010), Joel Whitburn Presents Top Pop Albums, Seventh Edition, Record Research Inc., ISBN 978-0-89820-183-3
