= Moment to Moment (song) =

1965 song

Song
- Published: 1965 by Southdale Music Corp. and Northern Music Corp.
- Released: 1965
- Composer: Henry Mancini
- Lyricist: Johnny Mercer

"Moment to Moment" is a popular song written by Henry Mancini and Johnny Mercer for the 1966 film of the same name. Mancini's recording of the song charted at the same time as that of Frank Sinatra. A single was also released in 1966 by Johnny Mathis, who performed it in concert throughout his career.

"Moment to Moment"

Single by Henry Mancini
- B-side: "Soldier in the Rain"
- Released: 1965
- Recorded: 1965
- Genre: Pop
- Length: 2:46
- Label: RCA Victor
- Producer: Joe Reisman

Henry Mancini singles chronology
"La Raspa" (1965)	"Moment to Moment" (1965)	"Hawaii (Main Theme)" (1966)

Music video
- "Moment to Moment" on YouTube

== Henry Mancini version ==
Two recordings of the song were released several weeks before the film's opening on January 27, 1966, one of which was the film version, which was credited to Henry Mancini, His Orchestra and Chorus and produced by Joe Reisman.

=== Chart performance ===
Mancini's recording of the song debuted on Billboard magazine's Easy Listening chart in the issue dated December 25, 1965, and peaked at number 27 during its six weeks there. It reached number 26 on Cash Box magazine's Looking Ahead chart, which was described as a "compilation, in order of strength, of up and coming records showing signs of breaking into The Cash Box Top 100". It got as high as number 4 on the pop chart in the Philippines.

=== Critical reception ===
In their review column, the editors of Cash Box featured the single as a Pick of the Week, which was their equivalent to a letter grade of A for both "Moment to Moment" and its B-side, "Soldier in the Rain". They described Mancini's recording of "Moment to Moment" as an "excellent reading" and "a tender, slow-moving, lyrical, moody romancer enhanced by a superb choral backing". The editors of Billboard wrote that it "has the warmth and ballad appeal of 'Moon River'."

=== Charts ===
Weekly chart performance for "Moment to Moment" by Henry Mancini, His Orchestra and Chorus
Chart (1965–1966)	Peak position
Philippines	4
US Billboard Easy Listening	27
US Looking Ahead (Cash Box)	26

"Moment to Moment"

Single by Frank Sinatra
- A-side: "It Was a Very Good Year"
- Released: 1965
- Recorded: September 14, 1965 (orchestra); October 21, 1965 (vocal)
- Studio: United Recording, Hollywood
- Genre: Pop
- Length: 2:55
- Label: Reprise
- Producer: Sonny Burke

Frank Sinatra singles chronology
"Everybody Has the Right to Be Wrong!" / "I'll Only Miss Her When I Think of Her" (1965)	"It Was a Very Good Year" / "Moment to Moment" (1965)	"Strangers in the Night" (1966)

Music video
- "Moment to Moment" on YouTube

== Frank Sinatra version ==
The other rendition released before the film's opening was by Frank Sinatra, who recorded the vocals on October 21, 1965. The orchestra track was recorded five weeks earlier, on September 14, with conductor Nelson Riddle, who was also the arranger. The recording was produced by Sonny Burke.

=== Chart performance ===
Sinatra's recording of the song also debuted on Billboard's Easy Listening chart in the issue dated December 25, 1965, but peaked at number 18 during its seven weeks there. It "bubbled under" Billboard's Hot 100 for two weeks that began in that same issue, during which time it peaked at number 115.

=== Critical reception ===
In their review column, the editors of Cash Box featured the single as a Pick of the Week, which was their equivalent to a letter grade of A for both "Moment to Moment" and its A-side, "It Was a Very Good Year". They described Sinatra's recording of "Moment to Moment" as "a moving rendition". The editors of Billboard wrote that it was "a strong Sinatra rendition".

=== Charts ===
Weekly chart performance for "Moment to Moment" by Frank Sinatra
Chart (1965–1966)	Peak position
US Billboard Easy Listening	18
US Bubbling Under the Hot 100 (Billboard)	115

"Moment to Moment"

Single by Johnny Mathis

from the album The Shadow of Your Smile
- B-side: "Glass Mountain"
- Released: 1966
- Recorded: January 12, 1966
- Genre: Pop
- Length: 2:23
- Label: Mercury
- Producer: Don Rieber

Johnny Mathis singles chronology
"On a Clear Day (You Can See Forever)" (1965)	"Moment to Moment" (1966)	"The Shadow of Your Smile" (1966)

Music video
- "Moment to Moment" on YouTube

== Johnny Mathis version ==
Johnny Mathis recorded "Moment to Moment" on January 12, 1966, for his album The Shadow of Your Smile. The orchestra was conducted by Jack Elliott, who also arranged the music. The track was produced by Don Rieber and released as a single. It did not chart, however.

=== Critical reception ===
In their review column, the editors of Cash Box gave "Moment to Moment" a letter grade of B+. They described it as "[l]ilting". The editors of Billboard wrote that the song was "treated to a Latin beat and an exceptional Mathis vocal".

=== Live performances ===
Mathis performed "Moment to Moment" for a phone-in fan on the A&E Network's 1998 Mathis concert Live by Request. In 2012, Mathis said, "I used to perform it constantly, but now by the time I get to the end and some of those high notes, I can hardly pull it off anymore." He did, however, sing it at his final live performance on May 18, 2025, as part of his Voice of Romance Tour.

== Bibliography ==
- Silva, Luiz Carlos do Nascimento (2000), Put Your Dreams Away: A Frank Sinatra Discography, Greenwood Publishing Group, ISBN 0313310556
- Whitburn, Joel (2009), Joel Whitburn's Top Pop Singles, 1955-2008, Record Research Inc., ISBN 978-0-89820-180-2
