= The Sweetheart Tree (album) =

Studio album by Johnny Mathis
- Released: September 30, 1965
- Recorded: May 6–8, 1965; June 15, 1965
- Genre: Vocal; pop/rock
- Length: 40:58 (US Version); 50:36 (UK Version)
- Label: Mercury
- Producer: Norman Newell

Johnny Mathis chronology
Love Is Everything (1965)	The Sweetheart Tree (1965)	The Shadow of Your Smile (1966)

Singles from The Sweetheart Tree
- 1. "The Sweetheart Tree" Released: July 1965

The Sweetheart Tree is an album by American pop singer Johnny Mathis that was released by Mercury Records on September 30, 1965, and included songs associated with Italy ("Arrivederci Roma"), France ("Clopin Clopant"), Ireland ("Danny Boy"), and Scotland ("The Skye Boat Song") as well as several selections, such as "I'll Close My Eyes" and "The Very Thought of You", from English composers.

The title song from the album had its first chart appearance on Billboard magazine's list of the 40 most popular Easy Listening songs in the US in the issue dated July 24 of that year and got as high as number 21 over the course of 10 weeks. It also bubbled under Billboard's Hot 100 for six weeks beginning in the August 7 issue, during which time it peaked at number 108. The album debuted on the magazine's Top LP's chart shortly after its release, in the issue dated October 16, 1965, and reached number 71 during its 26 weeks there.

The album The Sweetheart Tree was released on compact disc on November 6, 2012, as one of two albums on one CD, along with his 1966 follow-up, The Shadow of Your Smile. Both were also included in Sony's Mathis box set The Complete Global Albums Collection, which was released on November 17, 2014.

== History ==
Much of the album was recorded in London and features songs with an international flavor. It was released in two versions: in the US as The Sweetheart Tree, and in the UK it appeared under the title Away From Home. Ten of the songs are found on both albums. The US version has twelve tracks and includes the title track and "Mirage", not found on the UK version. The UK version has fourteen tracks, three of which ("If I Had You", "Try a Little Tenderness" and "If Love Were All") were not available in the US until they were released as part of The Complete Global Albums Collection. The fourth song, "In Love for the Very First Time" would appear on Mathis's next album The Shadow of Your Smile.

In the liner notes for the 2012 release of both The Sweetheart Tree and The Shadow of Your Smile on one compact disc, James Ritz wrote that the former "represents the beginning of the end of the 'pure' Mathis sound, at least in its conceptual approach" and that the latter "would serve as a transitional vehicle to a different formula for the Johnny Mathis recording career." The latter included covers of "Michelle" and "Yesterday" by the Beatles, which were still compatible with the easy listening genre but suggested that Mathis had a willingness to stay current.

== Reception ==
Professional ratings
Review scores
Source	Rating
Billboard	positive
The Encyclopedia of Popular Music	3/5 stars

Billboard wrote that "the rich, warm Mathis enhances a well-planned, diversified program of material," and that his "treatments of 'Danny Boy' and 'Symphony' are among the standout performances." "One of his best love mood packages" was their assessment.

Variety wrote, "Johnny Mathis is showcased here on an internationally flavored songalog [sic]."

== Track listing (US version) ==
=== Side one ===
1. "A Wonderful Day Like Today" from The Roar of the Greasepaint – The Smell of the Crowd (Leslie Bricusse, Anthony Newley) – 2:42
2. "Arrivederci Roma" from Seven Hills of Rome (Pietro Garinei, Sandro Giovannini, Renato Rascel, Carl Sigman) – 3:41
3. "Clopin Clopant" (Bruno Coquatrix, Pierre Dundan, Alex Kramer, Joan Whitney) – 3:40
4. "This Is Love" (Norman Newell) – 3:23
5. "I'll Close My Eyes" (Buddy Kaye, Billy Reid) – 3:53
6. "The Very Thought of You" (Ray Noble) – 3:49

=== Side two ===
1. "Danny Boy" (Frederic Weatherly) – 4:55
2. "The Sweetheart Tree" from The Great Race (Henry Mancini, Johnny Mercer) – 2:15
3. "Symphony" (Alex Alstone, Jack Lawrence, Andre Tabet) – 2:59
4. "The Skye Boat Song" (traditional) – 3:50
5. "Autumn Leaves" (Joseph Kosma, Johnny Mercer, Jacques Prevert) – 3:45
6. "Mirage" from Mirage (Quincy Jones, Bob Russell) – 2:06

== Track listing (UK version) ==
=== Side one ===
1. "A Wonderful Day Like Today" (Leslie Bricusse, Anthony Newley) – 2:42
2. "Clopin Clopant" (Bruno Coquatrix, Pierre Dundan, Alex Kramer, Joan Whitney) – 3:40
3. "The Skye Boat Song" (traditional) – 3:50
4. "If I Had You" (Jimmy Campbell, Reginald Connelly, Ted Shapiro) – 3:23
5. "Symphony" (Alex Alstone, Jack Lawrence, Andre Tabet) – 2:59
6. "Try a Little Tenderness" (Jimmy Campbell, Reginald Connelly, Harry Woods) – 3:25
7. "If Love Were All" from Bitter Sweet (Noël Coward) – 3:51

=== Side two ===
1. "Danny Boy" (Frederick Weatherly) – 4:55
2. "The Very Thought of You" (Ray Noble) – 3:49
3. "Autumn Leaves" (Joseph Kosma, Johnny Mercer, Jacques Prevert) – 3:45
4. "I'll Close My Eyes" (Buddy Kaye, Billy Reid) – 3:53
5. "This Is Love" (Norman Newell) – 3:23
6. "Arrivederci Roma" (Pietro Garinei, Sandro Giovannini, Renato Rascel, Carl Sigman) – 3:41
7. "I'm in Love for the Very First Time" from An Alligator Named Daisy (Paddy Roberts, Jack Woodman) – 3:20

== Recording dates ==
From the liner notes for The Complete Global Albums Collection:

- May 6, 1965: "Arrivederci Roma", "Clopin Clopant", "If Love Were All", "A Wonderful Day Like Today"
- May 7, 1965: "Autumn Leaves", "Danny Boy", "The Skye Boat Song", "This Is Love"
- May 8, 1965: "If I Had You", "I'll Close My Eyes", "Symphony", "Try a Little Tenderness", "The Very Thought of You"
- June 15, 1965: "Mirage", "The Sweetheart Tree"
- January 13, 1966: "I'm in Love for the Very First Time"

== Personnel ==
- Johnny Mathis – vocals
- Norman Newell – producer^{[A]}
- Alyn Ainsworth – arranger, conductor ("The Very Thought of You"); arranger ("Symphony")
- Allyn Ferguson – arranger, conductor ("Autumn Leaves", "The Skye Boat Song"); arranger ("I'll Close My Eyes"); conductor ("Danny Boy", "This Is Love")
- Geoff Love – arranger ("Danny Boy", "This Is Love")
- Lincoln Mayorga – arranger, conductor ("The Sweetheart Tree"); conductor ("Mirage")
- Tony Osborne – arranger, conductor ("Arrivederci Roma", "Clopin Clopant", "I'm in Love for the Very First Time", "A Wonderful Day Like Today"); conductor ("I'll Close My Eyes", "Symphony")
- Glenn Osser – arranger ("Mirage")
- Roddy McDowall – cover photos
- ^{A} The credits on the original album jacket read, "Produced by Global Records, Inc.", but Newell is credited as producer in the liner notes of both its CD debut and The Complete Global Albums Collection.

== Bibliography ==
- Whitburn, Joel (2007), Joel Whitburn Presents Billboard Top Adult Songs, 1961-2006, Record Research Inc., ISBN 978-0898201697
- Whitburn, Joel (2009), Joel Whitburn's Top Pop Singles, 1955-2008, Record Research Inc., ISBN 978-0898201802
- Whitburn, Joel (2010), Joel Whitburn Presents Top Pop Albums, Seventh Edition, Record Research Inc., ISBN 978-0-89820-183-3
