= So Nice (Johnny Mathis album) =

Studio album by Johnny Mathis
- Released: September 16, 1966
- Recorded: May 31, 1966; June 23, 1966; July 7, 1966; July 11–12, 1966
- Genre: Vocal; pop rock
- Length: 36:16
- Label: Mercury
- Producer: Johnny Mathis

Johnny Mathis chronology
The Shadow of Your Smile (1965)	So Nice (1966)	Johnny Mathis Sings (1967)

So Nice is an album by American pop singer Johnny Mathis released through Mercury Records on September 16, 1966. The singer included a trio of musical numbers from Man of La Mancha in this set as well as songs from Funny Girl, Kismet, and On a Clear Day You Can See Forever, shows that he had recognized on previous releases. Mathis also covers recent imports from France ("I Will Wait for You", "What Now My Love") and Brazil ("So Nice (Samba de Verao)") and offers a rendition of a 1944 hit record ("I Dream of You") as part of the mix.

The So Nice LP was released on compact disc on December 4, 2012, as one of two albums on one CD, the second of the two being its 1967 follow-up, Johnny Mathis Sings. Both were also included in Sony's Mathis box set The Complete Global Albums Collection, which was released on November 17, 2014.

== History ==
The bulk of the arranging and conducting chores on this project were handled by Glenn Osser, and the inclusion of a song co-written by his wife Edna brought back memories of the couple for Mathis. "'She used to come to the sessions, and I was very fond of her. He and his wife were just the nicest people.'" The singer also recalls his introduction to her composition "I Dream of You". "'I first heard it when I heard Johnny Nash sing it on his first album. And of course Glenn arranged it on my album. You know, I can always tell who arranged things by the horn section. On "The Music That Makes Me Dance" I can definitely hear Glenn Osser.'"

Mathis was exposed to the Man of La Mancha selections before they made it to Broadway. "'I went to the Village and saw Richard Kiley...It was the first time I had seen him...and he was brilliant. I always loved his voice...That's how I came to record the songs.'" That early exposure led to live performances of some of the numbers from the show that he did sooner than most of his colleagues. "'I remember doing those songs while the show was still running, and I think I was one of the first ones to do some of the songs live in a nightclub act.'" And he continued performing them long afterward. "'For many years I did a medley in concert. A high point was in London...I did it there, and it was the best version I ever did. I always remember it.'"

== Chart performance ==
The title track from the album debuted on the Billboard Easy Listening chart in the issue dated September 10, 1966, and stayed there for seven weeks, during which time it peaked at number 17. The album debuted on the magazine's Top LP's chart in the issue dated October 8, 1966, and made it to number 50 over the course of 18 weeks. It debuted on the Cash Box albums chart in the issue dated October 1, 1966, and remained on the chart for 17 weeks, peaking at number 42.

== Reception ==
Professional ratings
Review scores
Source	Rating
AllMusic	3.5/5 stars
Billboard	positive
The Encyclopedia of Popular Music	3/5 stars

AllMusic's Joe Viglione was effusive in his praise, "The singer works with authority — his pitch always perfect and his focus never missing the mark." He singles out a few tracks in particular. "Mathis can always pull a 'The Music That Makes Me Dance' out of his hat to give his huge and faithful audience the style and sound he is best known for, with Glenn Osser's conducting and arrangement simply sublime. The dozen songs on So Nice range from pop to standards with touches of jazz, with an exquisitely quiet 'I Dream of You' uncovering the singer's uncanny ability to blend his tone with an air of mystery. Even a lesser song like 'Baubles, Bangles and Beads' comes off with a touch of majesty; it's not easy to do, but Mathis pulls it off effortlessly."

Billboard mentions "His interpretation of "What Now My Love" is another standout."

Variety wrote "Mathis far-ranging voice gets a particularly impressive workout on the 'The Impossible Dream' from the score of "Man of La Mancha".

== Track listing ==
=== Side one ===
1. "The Impossible Dream (The Quest)" from Man of La Mancha (Joe Darion, Mitch Leigh) – 3:44
2. "I Will Wait for You" from The Umbrellas of Cherbourg (Jacques Demy, Norman Gimbel, Michel LeGrand) – 3:01
3. "What the World Needs Now Is Love" (Burt Bacharach, Hal David) – 2:37
4. "Hurry! It's Lovely Up Here" from On a Clear Day You Can See Forever (Alan Jay Lerner, Burton Lane) – 2:47
5. "Elusive Butterfly" (Bob Lind) – 2:08
6. "So Nice (Samba de Verao)" (Gimbel, Marcos Valle, Paulo Sergio Valle) – 3:05

=== Side two ===
1. "Dulcinea" from Man of La Mancha (Darion, Leigh) – 2:52
2. "What Now My Love" (Gilbert Becaud, Carl Sigman) – 3:14
3. "Man of La Mancha (I, Don Quixote)" from Man of La Mancha (Darion, Leigh) – 2:18
4. "The Music That Makes Me Dance" from Funny Girl (Bob Merrill, Jule Styne) – 3:35
5. "I Dream of You" (Marjorie Goetschius, Edna Osser) – 3:23
6. "Baubles, Bangles & Beads" from Kismet (Robert Wright, George Forrest) – 3:32

== Recording dates ==
From the liner notes for The Complete Global Albums Collection:

- May 31, 1966: "Elusive Butterfly", "I Will Wait for You", "The Impossible Dream (The Quest)", "What Now My Love", "What the World Needs Now Is Love"
- June 23, 1966: "Baubles, Bangles & Beads", "I Dream of You", "The Music That Makes Me Dance"
- July 7, 1966: "So Nice (Samba de Verao)"
- July 11, 1966: "Dulcinea"
- July 12, 1966: "Hurry! It's Lovely Up Here", "Man of La Mancha (I, Don Quixote)"

== Personnel ==
- Johnny Mathis – vocals; producer^{[A]}
- Glenn Osser – arranger, conductor (except where noted)
- Bryan Fahey – arranger, conductor ("Baubles, Bangles & Beads")
- Jack Feierman – conductor ("Dulcinea", "Man of La Mancha (I, Don Quixote)")
- Mort Stevens – arranger, conductor ("So Nice (Samba de Verao)")
- ^{A} The only production credit on the original album jacket reads, "A Global Records Production", but Mathis is credited as producer in the liner notes of The Complete Global Albums Collection.

== Bibliography ==
- Whitburn, Joel (2007), Joel Whitburn Presents Billboard Top Adult Songs, 1961-2006, Record Research Inc., ISBN 978-0898201697
- Whitburn, Joel (2010), Joel Whitburn Presents Top Pop Albums, Seventh Edition, Record Research Inc., ISBN 978-0-89820-183-3
- Hoffmann, Frank W (1988), The Cash box album charts, 1955-1974, Scarecrow Press, ISBN 0-810-82005-6
