= The Sweetheart Tree =

1965 song by Henry Mancini and Johnny Mercer

Song
- Published: 1965
- Composer: Henry Mancini
- Lyricist: Johnny Mercer

"The Sweetheart Tree" is a popular song written by Henry Mancini and Johnny Mercer for the 1965 film The Great Race. Recordings by Mancini and Johnny Mathis charted simultaneously after the film was released. Mancini and Mercer received an Academy Award nomination in the category of Best Song.

== In The Great Race ==
Natalie Wood's character, Maggie DuBois, performs "The Sweetheart Tree" in the film, but Jackie Ward dubs the voice that is heard. Tony Curtis's character, Leslie Gallant, listens to her sing the romantic lyrics as he shaves several feet away. They have stopped in the countryside after having completed most of the race together, and the song allows her to express her romantic feelings for him.

"The Sweetheart Tree"

Single by Henry Mancini, His Orchestra and Chorus

from the album The Great Race – Music from the Film Score
- B-side: "Pie-in-the-Face Polka"
- Released: 1965
- Recorded: May 1965
- Genre: Pop
- Length: 1:55
- Label: RCA Victor

Henry Mancini, His Orchestra and Chorus singles chronology
"Dear Heart" (1964)	"The Sweetheart Tree" (1965)	"La Raspa" (1965)

Music video
- "The Sweetheart Tree" on YouTube

== Henry Mancini version ==
=== Chart performance ===
The recording of "The Sweetheart Tree" by Henry Mancini, His Orchestra and Chorus peaked at number 117 on Billboard magazine's Bubbling Under Hot 100 Singles chart during its five weeks there that began in the July 17, 1965, issue. It also debuted on the magazine's Easy Listening chart in that issue and got as high as number 23 during its 11 weeks there. It reached number 89 on Cash Box magazine's best seller list and peaked at number 92 on the Top 100 Pop Sales and Performance chart in Music Vendor magazine.

=== Critical reception ===
The editors of Billboard wrote, "With much of the beauty and warmth of their hit 'Moon River', the combination of Johnny Mercer and Henry Mancini wins again with a charming ballad."

=== Charts ===
Weekly chart performance for "The Sweetheart Tree" by Henry Mancini, His Orchestra and Chorus
Chart (1965)	Peak position
US Billboard Easy Listening	23
US Bubbling Under the Hot 100 (Billboard)	117
US Top 100 Best Selling Tunes on Records (Cash Box)	89
US Top 100 Pop Sales and Performance (Music Vendor)	92

"The Sweetheart Tree"

Single by Johnny Mathis

from the album The Sweetheart Tree
- B-side: "Mirage"
- Released: 1965
- Recorded: June 15, 1965
- Genre: Pop
- Length: 2:15
- Label: Mercury

Johnny Mathis singles chronology
"Take the Time" (1965)	"The Sweetheart Tree" (1965)	"On a Clear Day You Can See Forever" (1965)

Music video
- "The Sweetheart Tree" on YouTube

== Johnny Mathis version ==
=== Recording ===
Johnny Mathis recorded "The Sweetheart Tree" on April 19, 1965, with an orchestra conducted by arranger Lincoln Mayorga. No producer credit was provided on the original 7-inch single or the Mathis album of the same name.

=== Chart performance ===
The Mathis recording of "The Sweetheart Tree" debuted on Billboard's Easy Listening chart in the July 24, 1965, issue, and peaked at number 21 six weeks later, in the issue for September 4. It also "bubbled under" the Hot 100 for six weeks that began in the issue dated August 7; it got as high as number 108. It reached number 75 on Cash Box magazine's best seller list and number 78 on the Top 100 Pop Sales and Performance chart in Music Vendor magazine.

=== Critical reception ===
In their review column, the editors of Cash Box magazine featured the single as a Pick of the Week, which was their equivalent to a letter grade of A for both "The Sweetheart Tree" and its B-side, "Mirage". They described "The Sweetheart Tree" as "a lyrical, slow-moving, especially tender romancer sold with loads of authority by the songster". The editors of Billboard wrote that the song was "given a beautiful reading by Mathis with a commercial, lush string and chorus backing".

=== Charts ===
Weekly chart performance for "The Sweetheart Tree" by Johnny Mathis
Chart (1965)	Peak position
US Billboard Easy Listening	21
US Bubbling Under the Hot 100 (Billboard)	108
US Top 100 Best Selling Tunes on Records (Cash Box)	75
US Top 100 Pop Sales and Performance (Music Vendor)	78

== Academy Award nomination ==
"The Sweetheart Tree" was nominated for Best Song and later performed by Robert Goulet at the 38th Academy Awards in 1966. It lost to "The Shadow of Your Smile" from The Sandpiper.

== Bibliography ==
- Mercer, Johnny; Kimball, Robert; Day, Barry; Kreuger, Miles; Davis, Eric (2009), The Complete Lyrics of Johnny Mercer, Knopf Doubleday Publishing Group, ISBN 978-0-307-26519-7
- Monush, Barry (2009), Everybody's Talkin': The Top Films of 1965-1969, New York: Applause Books, ISBN 978-1-557-83618-2
- Whitburn, Joel (2009), Joel Whitburn's Top Pop Singles, 1955-2008, Record Research Inc., ISBN 0898201802
- Whitburn, Joel (2012), Joel Whitburn's Hit Records 1954-1982, Record Research Inc., ISBN 978-0-89820-200-7
- Whitburn, Joel (2014), Joel Whitburn's Cash Box Pop Hits 1952-1996, Record Research Inc., ISBN 978-0-89820-209-0
- Wiley, Mason; Bona, Damien (1996), Inside Oscar: The Unofficial History of the Academy Awards, Ballantine Books, ISBN 0-345-40053-4
