= Johnny Mathis Sings =

Studio album by Johnny Mathis
- Released: March 10, 1967
- Recorded: November 4, 1963; August 27, 1965; June 23, 1966; September 15, 1966; October 28, 1966; October 31, 1966
- Genre: Vocal; pop rock
- Length: 38:30
- Label: Mercury
- Producer: Johnny Mathis

Johnny Mathis chronology
So Nice (1966)	Johnny Mathis Sings (1967)	Up, Up and Away (1967)

Johnny Mathis Sings is an album by American pop singer Johnny Mathis that was released by Mercury Records on March 10, 1967, and was the last of his 11 studio projects for the label. Eight of the twelve tracks were recorded after the completion of his previous LP, So Nice, while four of the tracks were leftovers from the recording sessions for previous Mercury albums. The finished product included a number from Broadway's The Roar of the Greasepaint—the Smell of the Crowd, a cover of the Beatles hit "Eleanor Rigby", two offerings from songwriters Burt Bacharach and Hal David, and three cuts that originated in film scores but had lyrics added later: the melody for "Strangers in the Night" was written for A Man Could Get Killed; "Somewhere My Love" began as "Lara's Theme" from Doctor Zhivago; and "Lovers in New York" started out as the instrumental title track from Breakfast at Tiffany's.^{[A]}

Johnny Mathis Sings was released on compact disc on December 4, 2012, as one of two albums on one CD, along with Mathis 1966 album, So Nice. Both were also included in Sony's Mathis box set The Complete Global Albums Collection, which was released on November 17, 2014.

== History ==
The song on this album that stood out for Mathis upon recollection was "Lovers in New York". "The minute I heard it in Breakfast at Tiffany's – and it was just that one scene when they were walking down the street in New York – I just loved it. And I said, I hope…there’s just got to be words to that, and it turns out there were. They were written by Jay Livingston and Ray Evans, who were wonderful writers…and nice men."

The point of interest here that Mathis addressed most candidly, however, was the fact that he was saying farewell to Mercury with this album. He summarized the time spent with the label in relation to the rest of his recording career in 2012. "'The only time I was not secure in what I was doing was during the three years I was with Mercury.'" The years of mentoring he enjoyed as a new recording artist at Columbia ended rather abruptly when he arrived there. "'I needed someone to listen and suggest alternatives as far as my note selections were concerned…a producer who listens to you and says, "I like what you’re doing, but I hate that last note you made. Don't do that…do this." It just didn't work as well as it did at Columbia.'" The time at Mercury may have been frustrating, but it did begin a new path in terms of song selection. "'I'd listen to the stuff [recorded at Mercury] and wish I had a chance to do it again. But it was beneficial in many ways because I was eventually able to sing music that was the direction that I went to when I went back to Columbia…wonderful songs that were not necessarily big hits but ones that suited me intellectually as well as vocally.'"

== Reception ==
Professional ratings
Review scores
Source	Rating
AllMusic	3.5/5 stars
The Encyclopedia of Popular Music	3/5 stars

Billboard wrote that "The dreamy vocal stylings of Mathis is enhanced by lush arrangements in this excpetional program of old and new tunes." Record World felt that "The tunes are new and old chestnuts-but warm and tasty and rich as Johnny sings them." Variety noted that Mathis "is showcased on a well-chosen songalog of oldies and recent hits."

Joe Viglione of AllMusic wrote that "these dozen tunes are grade A and sequenced very nicely." He also noted that the "vocal on "I Wish You Love" is extraordinary Mathis," and that he was especially fond of " a marvelous study of Bobby Hebb's "Sunny", a slow tempo rendition songwriter Hebb has stated he is most proud of".

== Chart performance ==
This final Mercury LP debuted on the Billboard Top LP's chart in the issue dated April 1, 1967, reaching number 103 during an 11-week chart run. On the Cash Box albums chart, it made its debut in the issue dated April 8, 1967, and remained on the chart for seven weeks, peaking at number 65.

== Track listing ==
=== Side one ===
1. "Saturday Sunshine" (Burt Bacharach, Hal David) – 2:36
2. "Lovers in New York" (Jay Livingston, Ray Evans, Henry Mancini) – 3:03
3. "Eleanor Rigby" (John Lennon, Paul McCartney) – 2:55
4. "Sunny" (Bobby Hebb) – 4:19
5. "Who Can I Turn To?" from The Roar of the Greasepaint—the Smell of the Crowd (Leslie Bricusse, Anthony Newley) – 2:40
6. "Strangers in the Night" (Bert Kaempfert, Charles Singleton, Eddie Snyder) – 3:30

=== Side two ===
1. "(There's) Always Something There to Remind Me" (Bacharach, David) – 2:42
2. "Somewhere My Love" (Maurice Jarre, Paul Francis Webster) – 3:30
3. "Who Can Say" (Norman Gimbel, Riz Ortolani) – 2:50
4. "I Wish You Love" (Albert Beach, Charles Trenet) – 4:22
5. "The Second Time Around" from High Time (Sammy Cahn, Jimmy Van Heusen) – 3:13
6. "Wake the Town and Tell the People" (Jerry Livingston, Sammy Gallop) – 2:50

== Recording dates ==
From the liner notes for The Complete Global Albums Collection:

- November 4, 1963: "Wake the Town and Tell the People"
- August 27, 1965: "Lovers in New York"
- June 23, 1966: "I Wish You Love", "The Second Time Around"
- September 15, 1966: "Who Can Say"
- October 28, 1966: "Saturday Sunshine", "(There's) Always Something There to Remind Me", "Who Can I Turn To?"
- October 31, 1966: "Eleanor Rigby", "Somewhere My Love", "Strangers in the Night", "Sunny"

== Personnel ==
- Johnny Mathis – vocals; producer^{[B]}
- Wallace Seawell – cover photos
- Lorser Feitelson (Ankrum Gallery, Los Angeles) – front cover painting

^{A} When "Lovers in New York" was included on the 1997 Mathis compilation The Global Masters, the liner notes indicated that the song was from a different Mancini project, the television series Peter Gunn.

^{B} Mathis is credited as producer of this album in the liner notes of The Complete Global Albums Collection, but no credits for arrangers or conductors were provided there or on the original album jacket or in the liner notes for the album's CD debut.

== Bibliography ==
- Whitburn, Joel (2010), Joel Whitburn Presents Top Pop Albums, Seventh Edition, Record Research Inc., ISBN 978-0-89820-183-3
- Hoffmann, Frank W (1988), The Cash box album charts, 1955-1974, Scarecrow Press, ISBN 0-810-82005-6
