= Love Is Everything (Johnny Mathis album) =

Studio album by Johnny Mathis
- Released: March 5, 1965
- Recorded: December 9, 1964; December 10, 1964; December 12, 1964
- Genre: Vocal; pop/rock
- Length: 36:59
- Label: Mercury
- Producer: Al Ham

Johnny Mathis chronology
Broadway (1964)	Love Is Everything (1965)	The Sweetheart Tree (1965)

Professional ratings
Review scores
Source	Rating
Record Mirror	3/5 stars
The Encyclopedia of Popular Music	3/5 stars

Love Is Everything is an album by American pop singer Johnny Mathis that was released by Mercury Records on March 5, 1965, and included covers of hit songs from the 1930s ("Dancing in the Dark"), 1940s ("Long Ago (and Far Away)"), 1950s ("An Affair to Remember (Our Love Affair)" and "Never Let Me Go") and 1960s ("Go Away Little Girl", "People", and "This Is All I Ask") as well as new songs from the composers of "Fly Me to the Moon" ("A Thousand Blue Bubbles"), "What Will Mary Say" ("One More Mountain"), and "It's the Most Wonderful Time of the Year" ("Love Is Everything").

The album debuted on Billboard magazine's Top LP's chart in the issue dated March 20, 1965, and remained there for 11 weeks, peaking at number 52.

Love Is Everything was released on compact disc on August 28, 2012, as one of two albums on one CD, the other album being the previously unreleased Mathis project titled Broadway. Both were also included in Sony's Mathis box set The Complete Global Albums Collection, which was released on November 17, 2014.

== History ==
Mathis commented on a couple of the selections here in the liner notes for the compact disc releases of the album. He provided some insight into his interest in "Long Ago (and Far Away)", which originated in the Rita Hayworth film Cover Girl: "I was very much influenced by people like Rita Hayworth… There she was, the most beautiful woman I've ever seen in my life, and she had all this talent."

He also explained why "A Thousand Blue Bubbles" stayed active in his repertoire. "I still sing it every once in a while when I do performances with symphonies. Audiences love to have a little chuckle once in a while because you tend to get serious when you have that many musicians in back of you and you lose your sense of humor. It comes off well."

== Track listing ==
=== Side one ===
1. "Never Let Me Go" from The Scarlet Hour (Jay Livingston, Ray Evans) – 2:31
2. "People" from Funny Girl (Bob Merrill, Jule Styne) – 3:08
3. "A Thousand Blue Bubbles" (Bart Howard, Carlo Rossi) – 2:40
4. "Love Is Everything" (Edward Pola, George Wyle) – 2:56
5. "Young and Foolish" from Plain and Fancy (Albert Hague, Arnold Horwitt) – 3:40
6. "An Affair to Remember (Our Love Affair)" from An Affair to Remember (Harold Adamson, Leo McCarey, Harry Warren) – 2:42

=== Side two ===
1. "Come Ride the Wind with Me" (Alfred Bartles, Bryan Lindsay) – 3:01
2. "Go Away Little Girl" (Gerry Goffin, Carole King) – 3:19
3. "Dancing in the Dark" from The Band Wagon (Arthur Schwartz, Howard Dietz) – 2:52
4. "Long Ago (and Far Away)" from Cover Girl (Jerome Kern, Ira Gershwin) – 3:42
5. "This Is All I Ask" (Gordon Jenkins) – 4:04
6. "One More Mountain" (Eddie Snyder, Paul Vance) – 2:24

== Recording dates ==
- December 9, 1964: "Come Ride the Wind with Me", "People", "Young and Foolish"
- December 10, 1964: "An Affair to Remember (Our Love Affair)", "Dancing in the Dark", "Go Away Little Girl", "One More Mountain", "This Is All I Ask"
- December 12, 1964: "Long Ago (and Far Away)", "Love Is Everything", "Never Let Me Go", "A Thousand Blue Bubbles"

== Personnel ==
- Johnny Mathis – vocals; liner notes
- Al Ham – producer^{[A]}
- Glenn Osser – arranger, conductor
- Wallace Seawell – cover photo
- ^{A} The credits on the original album jacket read, "Produced by Global Records, Inc., Recording Supervised and Edited by Al Ham", but Ham is credited as producer in the liner notes of both its CD debut and The Complete Global Albums Collection.

== Bibliography ==
- Whitburn, Joel (2010), Joel Whitburn Presents Top Pop Albums, Seventh Edition, Record Research Inc., ISBN 978-0-89820-183-3
