= The First 25 Years – The Silver Anniversary Album =

Compilation album by Johnny Mathis
- Released: June 19, 1981
- Recorded: 1956–1959; 1969–1980
- Genres: Vocal; stage & screen; R&B; pop/rock
- Length: 1:06:38
- Label: Columbia

Johnny Mathis chronology
I Love My Lady (1981)	The First 25 Years – The Silver Anniversary Album (1981)	Celebration – The Anniversary Album (1981)

The First 25 Years – The Silver Anniversary Album is a compilation album by American pop singer Johnny Mathis that was released in 1981 by Columbia Records. The back cover of the album notes that there are four new tracks ("It Doesn't Have to Hurt Every Time", "Nothing Between Us but Love", "There! I've Said It Again", and "The Way You Look Tonight"). A cover of the Commodores hit "Three Times a Lady" had been released on the UK version of his 1980 album Different Kinda Different, which was retitled All for You, but the Mathis rendition of the song makes its US debut here.

This compilation made its first appearance on Billboard magazine's Top LP's & Tapes chart in the issue dated July 25, 1981, and remained there for four weeks, peaking at number 173.

This release has a gatefold cover that opens to a gallery of photos of Mathis, many of which include other celebrities such as Jack Benny, Mike Douglas, Farrah Fawcett, Henry Mancini, Jane Olivor, Prince Charles, Karen Valentine, Dionne Warwick, and Flip Wilson.

The album was encoded with the CX noise reduction system.

Professional ratings
Review scores
Source	Rating
The Encyclopedia of Popular Music	4/5 stars

== Track listing ==
=== Side one ===
1. "Misty" (Johnny Burke, Erroll Garner) – 3:34
  - recorded 4/21/59 for his album Heavenly; single released 9/59; Billboard Hot 100: #12
2. "Begin the Beguine" (Cole Porter) – 4:16
  - rec. 1978 for his album The Best Days of My Life
3. "Didn't We" (Jimmy Webb) – 2:43
  - rec. for his 1969 album Love Theme From "Romeo And Juliet" (A Time For Us)
4. "It Doesn't Have to Hurt Every Time" (Jim Andron, Candy Parton) – 3:41
  - rec. 1/18/81
5. "Wonderful! Wonderful!" (Sherman Edwards, Ben Raleigh) – 2:49
  - rec. 9/20/56, rel. 11/5/56; Most Played by Jockeys: #14

Personnel

- Jack Gold – producer (tracks 2, 3, 4)
- Al Ham – producer (tracks 1, 5)
- Mitch Miller – producer (tracks 1, 5)
- Ray Conniff – arranger, conductor (track 5)
- Ernie Freeman – arranger, conductor (track 3)
- Glenn Osser – arranger, conductor (track1)
- Gene Page – arranger, conductor (tracks 2, 4)

=== Side two ===
1. "It's Not for Me to Say" from Lizzie (Allen, Stillman) – 3:05
  - rec. 9/20/56, rel. 2/25/57; Most Played by Jockeys: #5
2. "Stardust" (Hoagy Carmichael, Mitchell Parish) – 3:27
  - rec. for his 1975 album Feelings
3. "Three Times a Lady" (Lionel Richie) – 4:15
  - rec. 3/5/80 for his UK album All for You
4. "The Way You Look Tonight" (Dorothy Fields, Jerome Kern) – 3:17
  - rec. 11/26/80
5. "Deep Purple" (Peter DeRose, Mitchell Parish) – 3:31
  - rec. 1980 for his album Different Kinda Different

Personnel

- Jack Gold – producer (tracks 2, 3–4, 5)
- Al Ham – producer (track 1)
- Mitch Miller – producer (track 1)
- Ray Conniff – arranger, conductor (track 1)
- Arnold Goland – arranger, conductor (track 4)
- Gene Page – arranger, conductor (tracks 2, 3, 5)

=== Side three ===
1. "Chances Are" (Robert Allen, Al Stillman) – 3:02
  - rec. 6/16/57, rel. 8/12/57; Most Played by Jockeys: #1 (1 week)
2. "All the Things You Are" (Oscar Hammerstein II, Jerome Kern) – 3:33
  - rec. 1977 for his album Hold Me, Thrill Me, Kiss Me
3. "Love Theme from 'Romeo and Juliet' (A Time for Us)" (Larry Kusik, Nino Rota, Eddie Snyder) – 2:53
  - rec. for his 1969 album Love Theme From "Romeo And Juliet" (A Time For Us)
4. "Nothing Between Us but Love" (Ray Parker Jr., Candy Parton) – 3:21
  - rec. 11/26/80, rel. 6/18/81; non-charting single
5. "There! I've Said It Again" (Redd Evans, David Mann) – 2:46
  - rec. 11/26/80

Personnel

- Jack Gold – producer (tracks 2, 3, 4–5
- Al Ham – producer (track 1)
- Mitch Miller – producer (track 1)
- Ray Conniff – arranger, conductor (track 1)
- Ernie Freeman – arranger, conductor (track 3)
- Arnold Goland – arranger, conductor (track 5)
- Gene Page – arranger, conductor (tracks 2, 4)

=== Side four ===
1. "Too Much, Too Little, Too Late" performed with Deniece Williams (Nat Kipner, John Vallins) – 2:55
  - rec. 1/78 for his album You Light Up My Life, single rel. 3/78; Billboard Hot 100: #1 (1 week)
2. "As Time Goes By" (Herman Hupfeld) – 4:35
  - rec. 1978 for his album The Best Days of My Life
3. "When Sunny Gets Blue" (Marvin Fisher, Jack Segal) – 2:40
  - rec. 9/20/56, rel. 11/5/56; B-side of "Wonderful! Wonderful!"
4. "Ready or Not" performed with Deniece Williams (Amber DiLena, Jack Keller) – 2:51
  - rec. 4/20/78 for his and Williams's album That's What Friends Are For
5. "I'm Coming Home" (Thom Bell, Linda Creed) – 3:24
  - rec. 5/73 for his album I'm Coming Home, single rel. 7/27/73; Billboard Hot 100: 75

Personnel

- Thom Bell – producer, arranger, conductor (track 5)
- Jack Gold – producer (tracks 1, 2, 4)
- Al Ham – producer (track 3)
- Mitch Miller – producer (track 3)
- Ray Conniff – arranger, conductor (track 3)
- Gene Page – arranger, conductor (tracks 1, 2, 4)

== Song information ==
Two of the four new tracks on the album had previously been recorded by other artists. "The Way You Look Tonight" won the Academy Award for Best Original Song after it was performed in the 1936 film Swing Time by Fred Astaire, whose recording of the song spent six weeks at number one that same year. The second of the two, "There! I've Said It Again", had two number-one outings, the first of which, by Vaughn Monroe & His Orchestra, enjoyed six weeks atop the Most Played by Jockeys chart in Billboard magazine in 1945 and sold one million copies; Bobby Vinton's rendition of the song stayed in the top spot for four weeks on the magazine's Hot 100 and for five weeks on its Easy Listening chart in addition to reaching number 34 on the UK singles chart in 1964.

== Personnel ==
- Johnny Mathis – vocals
- Deniece Williams – vocals ("Ready or Not", "Too Much, Too Little, Too Late")
- Nancy Donald – design
- Mary Francis – design
- David Vance – front cover photography

== Bibliography ==
- Whitburn, Joel (1986), Joel Whitburn's Pop Memories, 1890-1954, Record Research Inc., ISBN 0898200830
- Whitburn, Joel (1994), Joel Whitburn's Pop Hits, 1940-1954, Record Research Inc., ISBN 0898201063
- Whitburn, Joel (2007), Joel Whitburn Presents Billboard Top Adult Songs, 1961-2006, Record Research Inc., ISBN 0898201691
- Whitburn, Joel (2009), Joel Whitburn's Top Pop Singles, 1955-2008, Record Research Inc., ISBN 0898201802
- Whitburn, Joel (2010), Joel Whitburn Presents Top Pop Albums, Seventh Edition, Record Research Inc., ISBN 0-89820-183-7
- Wiley, Mason; Bona, Damien (1996), Inside Oscar: The Unofficial History of the Academy Awards, Ballantine Books, ISBN 0345400534
