= Tears and Laughter (Johnny Mathis album) =

Compilation album by Johnny Mathis
- Released: 1980
- Recorded: 1970–1978
- Genre: Vocal; R&B; stage & screen; pop/rock
- Length: 1:11:46
- Label: CBS

Johnny Mathis chronology
Mathis Magic (1979)	Tears and Laughter (1980)	Different Kinda Different (1980)

Tears and Laughter is a compilation album by American pop singer Johnny Mathis that was released in the UK in 1980 on the CBS Records label. The title summarizes how the album is thematically organized, with the back cover labeling side one as "Tears" and side two as "Laughter".

The album entered the UK album chart on March 8, 1980, and spent two of its 15 weeks there at number one, and 10 days later, on March 18, the British Phonographic Industry awarded the album with Silver certification for sales of 60,000 units in the UK.

On August 19, 1994, Tears and Laughter was released on compact disc.

== Track listing ==
=== Side one ===
1. "Don't Give Up on Us" (Tony Macaulay) – 3:57
  - Jack Gold – producer
  - Gene Page – arranger, conductor
2. Professional ratings
  Review scores
  Source	Rating
  The Encyclopedia of Popular Music	3/5 stars
  "Goodbye to Love" (John Bettis, Richard Carpenter) – 3:12
  - Jerry Fuller – producer
  - D'Arneill Pershing – arranger, conductor
3. "Gone, Gone, Gone" (L. Russell Brown, Lisa Hayward) – 3:32
  - Jack Gold – producer
  - Gene Page – arranger, conductor
  - Steve Thompson – remix
4. "Midnight Blue" (Melissa Manchester, Carole Bayer Sager) – 3:34
  - Jack Gold – producer
  - Gene Page – arranger, conductor
5. "Solitaire" (Neil Sedaka, Phil Cody) – 4:33
  - Jack Gold – producer
  - Gene Page – arranger, conductor
6. "The Hungry Years" (Howard Greenfield, Neil Sedaka) – 4:35
  - Jack Gold – producer
  - Gene Page – arranger, conductor
7. "Alone Again (Naturally)" (Gilbert O'Sullivan) – 4:20
  - Jerry Fuller – producer
  - D'Arneill Pershing – arranger, conductor
8. "Too Much, Too Little, Too Late" performed with Deniece Williams (Nat Kipner, John Vallins) – 2:59
  - Jack Gold – producer
  - Gene Page – arranger, conductor
9. "Without You" (Tom Evans, Peter Ham) – 2:58
  - Jerry Fuller – producer
  - Al Capps – arranger
10. "It's Too Late" (Carole King) – 3:07
  - Johnny Mathis – producer
  - D'Arneill Pershing – arranger
  - Roy M. Rogosin - conductor

=== Side two ===
1. "Laughter in the Rain" (Neil Sedaka, Phil Cody) – 2:31
  - John Florez – producer
  - D'Arneill Pershing – arranger, conductor
2. "You Are the Sunshine of My Life" (Stevie Wonder) – 2:41
  - Jerry Fuller – producer
  - D'Arneill Pershing – arranger, conductor
3. "Everything Is Beautiful" (Ray Stevens) – 3:33
  - Jack Gold – producer
  - Ernie Freeman – arranger, conductor
4. "The Most Beautiful Girl" (Rory Michael Bourke, Billy Sherrill, Norris Wilson) – 2:30
  - Jack Gold – producer
  - Gene Page – arranger, conductor
5. "Betcha by Golly, Wow" (Thom Bell, Linda Creed) – 2:49
  - Jerry Fuller – producer
  - D'Arneill Pershing – arranger
6. "Just the Way You Are" performed with Deniece Williams (Billy Joel) – 3:44
  - Jack Gold – producer
  - Gene Page – arranger, conductor
7. "And I Love You So" (Don McLean) – 3:26
  - Jerry Fuller – producer
  - D'Arneill Pershing – arranger, conductor
8. "Song of Joy (Himno a la Alegria)" (Ludwig van Beethoven, Orbe, Ross Parker, Waldo de los Rios) – 4:01
  - Jack Gold – producer
  - Ernie Freeman – arranger, conductor
9. "Life Is a Song Worth Singing" (Thom Bell, Linda Creed) – 6:06
  - Thom Bell – producer, arranger, conductor
10. "You Light Up My Life" (Joe Brooks) – 3:55
  - Jack Gold – producer
  - Gene Page – arranger, conductor

== Personnel ==
- Johnny Mathis – vocals
- Janusz Guttner – design
- Rosław Szaybo – design
