= I Love My Lady =

Studio album by Johnny Mathis
- Released: December 8, 2017
- Recorded: December 23, 1980; January 6, 1981; January 8, 1981; January 21, 1981
- Genre: R&B; jazz
- Length: 38:32
- Label: Columbia
- Producer: Bernard Edwards; Nile Rodgers

Johnny Mathis chronology
The Best of Johnny Mathis 1975–1980 (1980)	I Love My Lady (2017)	The First 25 Years – The Silver Anniversary Album (1981)

I Love My Lady is an album by American pop singer Johnny Mathis that was completed in 1981 but not released in its entirety until December 8, 2017, when it was included in the box set The Voice of Romance: The Columbia Original Album Collection. It was written and produced by Chic founders Bernard Edwards and Nile Rodgers and represented an attempt at shifting away from the easy listening style of music that Mathis had been recording for 25 years to the more contemporary sound of the team behind "Le Freak" and "We Are Family".

As part of Record Store Day on April 21, 2018, Legacy Recordings gave I Love My Lady its standalone debut with a pressing on clear smoke vinyl.

== History ==
Mathis experienced a career resurgence in the spring of 1978 with the release of a duet he recorded with Deniece Williams titled "Too Much, Too Little, Too Late". The single was his first to achieve Gold certification from the Recording Industry Association of America, which at the time was awarded for sales of one million units in the US; it was his first song to make the top 40 on the Billboard Hot 100 since the number 30 showing of "Every Step of the Way" in 1963 and his first number one song on that chart since the magazine started it in 1958 (although "Chances Are" spent a week at number one on the magazine's "Most Played by Jockeys" chart in 1957). The duet also gave Mathis a resurgence in album sales with its inclusion on You Light Up My Life, his first top 10 entry on the magazine's LP chart since 1966 and his first non-holiday studio album to receive Platinum certification since 1959's Heavenly.

Mathis was able to sustain some of the momentum in album sales by re-teaming with Williams immediately for an entire album of duets: That's What Friends Are For went Gold and had a respectable peak at number 19 on the album chart but managed only the number 47 "You're All I Need to Get By" as far as pop chart entries. His first album release in 1979, The Best Days of My Life, only got as high as number 122 with two songs just making the Adult Contemporary chart, and his second, Mathis Magic, missed the Billboard album chart altogether and had no charting singles. Although he had been leaning more heavily on original material since the success with Williams, he had worked with the same producer, Jack Gold, on eight of the albums that he recorded between 1975 and 1980 and was willing to explore other options.

In late December 1980 and January 1981 Mathis recorded the album I Love My Lady with Bernard Edwards and Nile Rodgers at the helm. All tracks for the album were written by the duo, whose songwriting credits included hits by their own band, Chic, as well as Sister Sledge and Diana Ross. Mathis was quoted as having enjoyed the project: "What a joy to work and sing with Bernard and Nile ... A unique experience that introduced me to new and exciting singing, as though using musical notes and phrases as brush strokes. A true departure for me as a vocalist and a milestone in my career." After the completion of the album, "nobody said anything over at Columbia, and a best-of album [The First 25 Years – The Silver Anniversary Album] came out instead."

In 2004 a spokeswoman for Mathis explained the efforts that had been made to get the album released. "We have forwarded to Sony, by way of our attorney, letters, inquiries, etc. from fans who were hoping to hear this album. This seems to have had no impact." When asked in a 2011 radio interview as to why the album had never been released, Mathis gave a brief chuckle as he replied, "Probably because the record company is almighty when you're making music to sell. They have their likes and dislikes.... I guess because they didn't think it would sell."

== Resurfacing ==
At the EMP Pop Conference on April 19, 2009, music historian Andy Zax gave the presentation "Lost in Lost Music: Rediscovering Johnny Mathis' I Love My Lady" in which he describes his interest in producing a CD box set that would cover the music that Edwards and Rodgers produced for Chic and other artists. He discovered the unreleased Mathis album in August 2007 while looking through the vault of tapes that would have held much of the material he was wanting for the project.

Music journalist Ned Raggett included his notes in his report on the presentation that described the album as "less funk [such as what Chic was known for] and more jazz, like Weather Report but with bright melodic hooks. Sounds like Al Jarreau's This Time and Steely Dan's Gaucho (minus the boring stuff!)." Reviewing the album in Echoes, Adam Mattera singled out "Fall In Love (I Want To)" as "arguably Chic's greatest production of the era - recalling both the hypnotic allure of "I Want Your Love" and the smooth jazz of "Savoir Faire", topped with a gossamer vocal from Johnny."

Four of the eight tracks from the album have made their way onto compilations by Rodgers. The 2010 release Nile Rodgers presents The Chic Organization Boxset Vol 1 / "Savoir Faire" included the tracks "I Want to Fall in Love", "It's Alright to Love Me", and "Something to Sing About". The title track from the album, along with "Something to Sing About", was released on Mathis' UK-only Ultimate Collection in 2011. "I Love My Lady" also appeared in 2013 on two two-disc compilations: Nile Rodgers presents The Chic Organization – Up All Night and Nile Rodgers presents The Chic Organization – Up All Night Disco Edition.

The Shapeshifters' 2006 single "Sensitivity" features samples from an out-take version of "Love and Be Loved" supplied to them by Nile Rodgers. Chic are given a featured artist credit on the track.

== Track listing ==
All tracks written by Bernard Edwards & Nile Rodgers

=== Side one ===
1. "Fall in Love (I Want to)" – 6:00
2. "It's Alright to Love Me" – 4:20
3. "Something to Sing About" – 4:13
4. "I Love My Lady" – 5:26

=== Side two ===
1. "Take Me" – 6:50
2. "Judy" – 3:11
3. "Stay with Me" – 3:38
4. "Love and Be Loved" – 4:54

== Recording dates ==
From the liner notes for The Voice of Romance: The Columbia Original Album Collection:

- December 23, 1980 – "Love and Be Loved", "Something to Sing About"
- January 6, 1981 – "Fall in Love (I Want to)", "I Love My Lady"
- January 8, 1981 – "It's Alright to Love Me", "Stay with Me", "Take Me"
- January 21, 1981 – "Judy"

== Personnel ==
From the liner notes for The Voice of Romance: The Columbia Original Album Collection:

- Johnny Mathis – vocals
- Bernard Edwards – producer
- Nile Rodgers – producer

Nile Rodgers has confirmed that he is the sole arranger-conductor of "I Love My Lady", not Gene Page as has been previously reported.

== Bibliography ==
- Whitburn, Joel (2007), Joel Whitburn Presents Billboard Top Adult Songs, 1961–2006, Record Research Inc., ISBN 0898201691
- Whitburn, Joel (2009), Joel Whitburn's Top Pop Singles, 1955–2008, Record Research Inc., ISBN 0898201802
- Whitburn, Joel (2010), Joel Whitburn Presents Top Pop Albums, Seventh Edition, Record Research Inc., ISBN 0-89820-183-7
