= Life Is a Song Worth Singing =

Life Is a Song Worth Singing may refer to:

- "Life Is a Song Worth Singing" (song), written by Thom Bell and Linda Creed, notably recorded by Johnny Mathis in 1973
- Life Is a Song Worth Singing (album), a 1978 album released by Teddy Pendergrass with the title song being a cover version of the Mathis song
- Life Is a Song Worth Singing: The Complete Thom Bell Sessions, a two-disc compilation set featuring remastered editions of Mathis Is...
