= The Best of Johnny Mathis 1975–1980 =

Compilation album by Johnny Mathis
- Released: 1980
- Recorded: 1975–1980
- Genre: Vocal; R&B; stage & screen
- Length: 34:50
- Label: Columbia
- Producer: Jack Gold

Johnny Mathis chronology
Different Kinda Different (1980)	The Best of Johnny Mathis; 1975–1980 (1980)	I Love My Lady (1981)

Professional ratings
Review scores
Source	Rating
Allmusic	3/5 stars
The Encyclopedia of Popular Music	3/5 stars

The Best of Johnny Mathis 1975–1980 is a compilation album by American pop singer Johnny Mathis that was released in the fall of 1980 by Columbia Records. This collection is similar to his last major compilation, 1972's Johnny Mathis' All-Time Greatest Hits, in that it excludes many of his American radio hits of this period ("Arianne", "Begin the Beguine", "Do Me Wrong, But Do Me", "Loving You-Losing You", "One Day in Your Life", "Stardust", "Yellow Roses on Her Gown", and "You're All I Need to Get By", all of which made the Adult Contemporary chart in Billboard magazine) in favor of songs that made the UK singles chart ("Gone, Gone, Gone", "When a Child Is Born") or contemporary hits by other people ("Just the Way You Are", "With You I'm Born Again", "You Light Up My Life").

The album made its first appearance on Billboard magazine's Top LP's & Tapes chart in the issue dated December 27, 1980, and remained there for seven weeks, peaking at number 140.

In 1984 it was released on compact disc, and it received Gold certification from the Recording Industry Association of America on October 21, 1994.

== Reception ==
Although his retrospective review on Allmusic is generally positive, Stephen Thomas Erlewine is dismayed by the selections for the album, pointing out that the two pop songs by Mathis that made the Billboard Hot 100 during the period covered here were duets with Deniece Williams: their number one hit "Too Much, Too Little, Too Late" and number 47 follow-up "You're All I Need to Get By". "The low number of hits would make Best of Johnny Mathis (1975-1980) unfamiliar territory for anyone but diehard fans, and matters are made worse by the fact that [of these two pop chart entries] only the number one single...is featured on the record."

== Track listing ==
Side one

1. "Too Much, Too Little, Too Late" performed with Deniece Williams (Nat Kipner, John Vallins) – 2:59
2. "What I Did for Love" (Marvin Hamlisch, Edward Kleban) – 2:44
3. "You Light Up My Life" (Joe Brooks) – 3:55
4. "99 Miles from L.A." (Hal David, Albert Hammond) – 3:35
5. "When a Child Is Born" (Ciro Dammicco, Fred Jay) – 3:41

Side two

1. "Just the Way You Are" performed with Deniece Williams (Billy Joel) – 3:44
2. "With You I'm Born Again" (Carol Connors, David Shire) – 4:03
3. "Gone, Gone, Gone" (L. Russell Brown, Lisa Hayward) – 3:32
4. "The Best Days of My Life" (Cheryl Christiansen, Arnold Goland, Jack Gold) – 3:30
5. "The Last Time I Felt Like This" performed with Jane Olivor (Alan Bergman, Marilyn Bergman, Marvin Hamlisch) – 2:57

== Personnel ==
- Johnny Mathis – vocals
- Jane Olivor – vocals ("The Last Time I Felt Like This")
- Deniece Williams – vocals (" Just the Way You Are", "Too Much, Too Little, Too Late")
- Jack Gold – producer
- Gene Page – arranger, conductor
- Art Freeman – vocal arranger ("When a Child Is Born")
- Dick Bogert – engineer (except as noted)
- Ray Gerhardt – engineer ("99 Miles from LA", "What I Did for Love")
- Steve Thompson – remix ("Gone, Gone, Gone")
- Jo-Anne Steinberg – production coordinator
- David Vance – photographer

== Bibliography ==
- Whitburn, Joel (2007), Joel Whitburn Presents Billboard Top Adult Songs, 1961-2006, Record Research Inc., ISBN 0898201691
- Whitburn, Joel (2009), Joel Whitburn's Top Pop Singles, 1955-2008, Record Research Inc., ISBN 0898201802
- Whitburn, Joel (2010), Joel Whitburn Presents Top Pop Albums, Seventh Edition, Record Research Inc., ISBN 0-89820-183-7
