= Hold Me, Thrill Me, Kiss Me (Johnny Mathis album) =

Studio album by Johnny Mathis
- Released: August 15, 1977
- Recorded: April 20, 1977; May 31, 1977; June 9, 1977; June 13, 1977
- Studio: A&M, Hollywood; H. B. Barnum, Los Angeles
- Genre: Vocal
- Length: 28:30
- Label: Columbia
- Producer: Jack Gold

Johnny Mathis chronology
The Mathis Collection (1977)	Hold Me, Thrill Me, Kiss Me (1977)	You Light Up My Life (1978)

Alternate cover
- Sweet Surrender (UK)

Professional ratings
Review scores
Source	Rating
AllMusic	2.5/5 stars
The Encyclopedia of Popular Music	3/5 stars

Hold Me, Thrill Me, Kiss Me is an album by American pop singer Johnny Mathis that was released on August 15, 1977, by Columbia Records and found him firmly planted in the cover album genre once again in that no original songs were included. AllMusic's Joe Viglione did feel, however, that "they seem to be trying to cover all the bases here," meaning that it had a variety of selections, including a standard from 1939 ("All the Things You Are"), a hit that charted in both the 1950s and 1960s ("Hold Me, Thrill Me, Kiss Me"), a country crossover ("The Most Beautiful Girl"), and recent offerings from stage ("One", "Tomorrow") and screen ("Evergreen (Love Theme from A Star Is Born)", "I Always Knew I Had It in Me").

Although the album did not reach Billboard magazine's Top LPs & Tape chart, it did spend a week in the issue dated September 17, 1977, at number 201 on the Bubbling Under the Top LPs chart, which, according to Joel Whitburn, "listed albums that were on the rise in sales that did not quite achieve the sales necessary to make Billboard's main 200-position pop albums chart." For its release in the UK, the album was entitled Sweet Surrender, which was also the name of the song that was added on to the original track listing but had first appeared on his 1973 album Me and Mrs. Jones. Sweet Surrender spent its one week on the UK album chart at number 55 but received Silver certification for sales of 60,000 units in the UK from the British Phonographic Industry on January 4, 1978.

In 1995, the title track from the album was used in the film To Wong Foo, Thanks for Everything! Julie Newmar but was not included on the soundtrack recording.

== Reception ==
AllMusic's Joe Viglione, writing retrospectively, also described the album as "a fine mixture of classic Mathis" and "a pleasant album from a performer who delivers the goods with ease."

== Track listing ==
=== Side one ===
1. "Hold Me, Thrill Me, Kiss Me" (Harry Noble) – 2:56
2. "We're All Alone" (Boz Scaggs) – 3:22
3. "All the Things You Are" from Very Warm for May (Oscar Hammerstein II, Jerome Kern) – 3:33
4. "One" from A Chorus Line (Marvin Hamlisch, Edward Kleban) – 2:26
5. "When I Need You" (Albert Hammond, Carole Bayer Sager) – 3:26

=== Side two ===
1. "The Most Beautiful Girl" (Rory Michael Bourke, Billy Sherrill, Norris Wilson) – 2:30
2. "Tomorrow" from Annie (Martin Charnin, Charles Strouse) – 2:29
3. "Evergreen (Love Theme from A Star Is Born)" from A Star Is Born (Barbra Streisand, Paul Williams) – 3:15
4. "I Always Knew I Had It in Me" from The Greatest (Gerry Goffin, Michael Masser) – 3:02
5. "Don't Give Up on Us" (Tony Macaulay) – 3:57

For the Sweet Surrender album in the UK, the succeeding title track was inserted at the end of side one, but the order of the original 10 songs was unchanged.

=== 2017 CD bonus tracks ===
This album's CD release as part of the 2017 box set The Voice of Romance: The Columbia Original Album Collection included two bonus tracks:

- "Experience" (unknown) – 4:17
- "If It's Magic" (Stevie Wonder) – 3:36

Before this, "Experience" had not been issued, and "If It's Magic" had only been available on the 1981 UK compilation Celebration – The Anniversary Album.

== Recording dates ==
From the liner notes for The Voice of Romance: The Columbia Original Album Collection:

- April 20, 1977 – "Don't Give Up on Us", "I Always Knew I Had It in Me", "Tomorrow"
- May 31, 1977 – "Evergreen (Love Theme from A Star Is Born)", "Hold Me, Thrill Me, Kiss Me", "When I Need You"
- June 9, 1977 – "The Most Beautiful Girl", "One"
- June 13, 1977 – "All the Things You Are", "We're All Alone"
- June 14, 1977 – "If It's Magic"
- September 30, 1977 – "Experience"

== Personnel ==
From the liner notes for the original album:

- Johnny Mathis – vocals
- Jack Gold – producer
- Gene Page – arranger, conductor
- Dick Bogert – engineer, mixer
- Sam Emerson – photography

== Bibliography ==
- Whitburn, Joel (2004), Joel Whitburn Presents Top R&B/Hip-Hop Singles, 1942-2004, Record Research Inc., ISBN 0898201608
- Whitburn, Joel (2010), Joel Whitburn Presents Top Pop Albums, Seventh Edition, Record Research Inc., ISBN 978-0-89820-183-3
