= Individually & Collectively =

Studio album by the 5th Dimension
- Released: 1972
- Label: Bell
- Producer: Bones Howe

The 5th Dimension chronology
| The 5th Dimension / Live!! (1971) | Individually & Collectively (1972) | Living Together, Growing Together (1973) |

Singles from Individually and Collectively
- 1. "(Last Night) I Didn't Get to Sleep at All" Released: March 1972; 2. "If I Could Reach You" Released: August 1972

Professional ratings
Review scores
| Source | Rating |
|---|---|
| AllMusic | 3.5/5 stars |

Individually and Collectively is the seventh studio album by the American pop group The 5th Dimension, released in 1972. The album peaked at No. 58 on the Billboard Top 200 Albums chart on June 24, 1972. This album includes both of the group's final top 10 hits on the Billboard Hot 100 Singles chart — "(Last Night) I Didn't Get to Sleep at All" (also No. 2 on the Billboard Easy Listening chart and No. 28 on the Billboard Hot R&B chart) and "If I Could Reach You". Both feature lead vocals by Marilyn McCoo. "(Last Night) I Didn't Get to Sleep at All" was their sixth and final RIAA Platinum record.

The album's title is reflective of the record containing content in which the group goes from its famous five-part harmonies to lead-feature songs. Billy Davis, Jr. is the lead on nearly half of the album, including on the group's cover of Elton John's "Border Song". Ron Townson is also issued a rare lead vocal on "Band of Gold". "Black Patch", a Laura Nyro composition which ends the album, features each member taking lead on part of a verse, including – for the first time – Lamonte McLemore. The group performed this final song on Soul Train, along with the 1973 non-album single, "Flashback".

== Track listing ==
Side A

1. "Leave a Little Room" (Michael Randall)
2. "(Last Night) I Didn't Get to Sleep at All" (Tony Macaulay)
3. "All Kinds of People" (Burt Bacharach, Hal David)
4. "Sky & Sea" (Johnny Alf)
5. "Tomorrow Belongs to the Children" (Bob Gundry)
6. "Turn Around to Me" (Gerry Goffin, Michael Masser)

Side B

1. "If I Could Reach You" (Randy MacNeil)
2. "Half Moon" (Johana Hall, John Hall)
3. "Band of Gold" (Bob Musel, Jack Taylor)
4. "Border Song" (Elton John, Bernie Taupin)
5. "Black Patch" (Laura Nyro)

== Personnel ==
- Guitar: Michael Anthony, Dennis Budimir, Fred Tackett
- Bass guitar: Joe Osborn
- Keyboards: Isaiah Jones Jr., Larry Knechtel, Michael Omartian, Jimmy Rowles
- Drums: Hal Blaine
- Percussion: Larry Bunker
- Saxophone: Bill Perkins
- Horns: Bill Holman
- Strings: The Sid Sharp Strings

== Charts ==
Chart peaks for Individually & Collectively
| Chart (1972) | Peak position |
|---|---|
| Australia (Kent Music Report) | 44 |
| US Billboard 200 | 58 |
| US Billboard Best-Selling Soul LP's | 21 |
| US Cashbox Top 100 Albums | 49 |

=== Singles ===
| Song | Year | Chart | Peak position |
|---|---|---|---|
| "(Last Night) I Didn't Get to Sleep at All" | 1972 | Billboard Hot 100 | 8 |
| "If I Could Reach You" | 1972 | Billboard Hot 100 | 10 |

== Personnel ==
- Marilyn McCoo – Soprano voice, lead vocals (tracks A2, B1), background vocals
- Florence LaRue – Alto voice, lead vocals (track A3), background vocals
- Billy Davis Jr. – Baritone voice, lead vocals (tracks A1, A5, B2), background vocals
- Ron Townson – Tenor voice, lead vocals (track B3), background vocals
- Lamonte McLemore – Baritone and bass voice, background vocals
