= Hold Me, Thrill Me, Kiss Me (disambiguation) =

"Hold Me, Thrill Me, Kiss Me" is a 1952 song.

Hold Me, Thrill Me, Kiss Me may also refer to:

- Hold Me, Thrill Me, Kiss Me (Gloria Estefan album), 1994, featuring the 1952 song
- Hold Me, Thrill Me, Kiss Me (Johnny Mathis album), 1977
- Hold Me, Thrill Me, Kiss Me (film), a 1992 film starring Adrienne Shelly

== See also ==
- "Hold Me, Thrill Me, Kiss Me, Kill Me," a 1995 song by U2
