= Friends in Love =

Friends in Love may refer to:

- "Friends in Love", a song by Johnny Mathis and Dionne Warwick
- Friends in Love (Johnny Mathis album), 1982
- Friends in Love (Dionne Warwick album), 1982
