= Mathis Is... =

Studio album by Johnny Mathis
- Released: February 21, 1977
- Recorded: October 4–6, 1976
- Studio: Kaye-Smith Studios, Seattle, Washington; Western Recorders, Los Angeles, California; Sound Labs, Los Angeles, California
- Genre: Vocal
- Length: 39:09
- Label: Columbia
- Producer: Thom Bell

Johnny Mathis chronology
The Johnny Mathis Collection (1976)	Mathis Is... (1977)	The Mathis Collection (1977)

Mathis Is... is an album by American pop singer Johnny Mathis that was released on February 21, 1977, by Columbia Records and reunited the singer with producer Thom Bell for the first time since their collaboration on I'm Coming Home in 1973. As with that project, Mathis Is... focuses primarily on new songs, the one exception being a cover of "Sweet Love of Mine" from the 1975 Pick of the Litter album by The Spinners.

Mathis Is... made its first appearance on Billboard magazine's Top LP's & Tapes chart in the issue dated March 19, 1977, and remained there for five weeks, peaking at number 139.

One of the songs from the album, "Loving You-Losing You", entered the magazine's list of the 50 most popular Easy Listening songs in the US the following month, in the April 2 issue, and peaked at number 29 over the course of five weeks.

== Reception ==
Professional ratings
Review scores
Source	Rating
AllMusic	3.5/5 stars
The Encyclopedia of Popular Music	3/5 stars

Billboard gave the album its seal of approval. "Mathis's voice becomes the instrument again for Thom Bell's musical concept for chartdom: soft, sweet, non-abrasive but catchy orchestral charts which flow with the romanticism of Mathis's distinct voice. Orchestra and chorus are provided—with a new element of vibes adding fills—to this pleasant almost background kind of program." They pinpointed Bell's approach to this project. "There's a formatted ring to Bell's concept for the Mathis vocal range: a midrange carriage for his vibrato and clear tenor, with strings and soft background voices adding strength to Mathis's own gliding ability."

AllMusic's Joe Viglione retrospectively noted the uniqueness of this release within the context of the series of albums on which Mathis covered hits by other artists, albums which, he writes, "played it safe, which makes Bell's return on Mathis Is an important but sadly forgotten event in Philly soul history." He adds, "It's a shame Mathis didn't continue this notion over half a dozen albums or so, branching out from the safety of re-recording hits of the time and going back to the thing that made him so popular in the first place: his first-rate work with Percy Faith, Nelson Riddle, and Ray Conniff. Lou Rawls reinvented himself with the material from these geniuses from Philadelphia while Bobby Hebb and Johnny Mathis were involved, but didn't stay in the game long enough to be rewarded as richly as they should have been through the Thom Bell/Kenny Gamble/Leon Huff magic." The writing here was the key for Viglione. "Casey James and LeRoy Bell, the authors of Elton John's Grammy-nominated 1979 Top Ten hit, "Mama Can't Buy You Love," are on board here, only they do their co-writing on Mathis Is with the master, Thom Bell. The result is extraordinary music for both Mathis followers and fans of the Philly sound." He concludes, "This album has the elegance found on "Mama Can't Buy You Love" without the drive; it is velvety, smooth and a perfect fit for Mathis's perfect voice. Urban adult contemporary as classy as the Delfonics. Very, very nice."

== Track listing ==
All songs written by LeRoy Bell and Thom Bell except as noted:

=== Side one ===
1. "As Long As We're Together" (Anthony Bell, T. Bell, Jo Dee Omer) – 4:59
2. "Lullaby of Love" – 3:43
3. "Loving You-Losing You" – 4:33
4. "I'll Make You Happy" – 4:57

=== Side two ===
1. "Heaven Must Have Made You Just for Me" – 4:09
2. "Hung Up in the Middle of Love" (T. Bell, Sherman Marshall) – 4:22
3. "World of Laughter" (T. Bell, Casey James) – 3:23
4. "I Don't Want to Say No" – 5:16
5. "Sweet Love of Mine" (Vinnie Barrett, Bobby Eli) – 3:47

=== Real Gone Music CD Bonus Tracks ===
On March 10, 2015, Real Gone Music released Life Is a Song Worth Singing: The Complete Thom Bell Sessions, a two-disc set featuring remastered editions of Mathis Is... and Mathis and Bell's other LP collaboration, I'm Coming Home, along with bonus tracks on each disc. This was the first release of Mathis Is... on compact disc.

Disc one (I'm Coming Home) bonus tracks

1. "I'm Coming Home" (Stereo Single Version) – 3:24
2. "I'm Stone in Love with You" (Unreleased Instrumental Version) – 3:30
3. "And I Think That's What I'll Do" (Unreleased Instrumental Version) – 4:36
4. "Life Is a Song Worth Singing" (Mono Single Edit - Short Version) – 3:20

Disc two (Mathis Is...) bonus tracks

1. "Betcha by Golly, Wow" (T. Bell, Linda Creed) – 2:49
  - recorded in 1972 for his album The First Time Ever (I Saw Your Face)
2. "Break Up to Make Up" (T. Bell, Creed, Kenneth Gamble) – 3:50
  - rec. in 1973 for his album Killing Me Softly with Her Song
3. "You're As Right As Rain" (T. Bell, Creed) – 3:02
  - rec. in 1975 for his album When Will I See You Again
4. "You Brought Me Love" performed with Patti Austin (Andy Goldmark) – 4:07
  - rec. in 1991 for his album Better Together: The Duet Album
5. "You Make Me Feel Brand New" performed with Yolanda Adams (T. Bell, Creed) – 5:12
  - rec. in 2008 for his album A Night to Remember
6. "Loving You-Losing You" (Mono Single Version) (LeRoy Bell, T. Bell) – 3:46

== Recording dates ==
From the liner notes for The Voice of Romance: The Columbia Original Album Collection:

- October 4, 1976 – "Hung Up in the Middle of Love", "Lullaby of Love", "World of Laughter"
- October 5, 1976 – "As Long As We're Together", "Heaven Must Have Made You Just for Me", "I'll Make You Happy", "Sweet Love of Mine"
- October 6, 1976 – "I Don't Want to Say No", "Loving You-Losing You"

== Personnel ==
=== Original album ===
From the liner notes for the original album:

Production

- George Bell – assistant engineer
- Thom Bell – arranger (except as noted), conductor, producer
- Tony Bell Sr. – arranger ("I'll Make You Happy", "Sweet Love of Mine")
- Nancy Donald – design
- Ron Gangnes – assistant engineer
- Bernie Grundman – mastering engineer
- Winslow Koots – assistant engineer
- Don Murray – chief engineer
- Buz Richman – assistant engineer
- Norman Seeff – photography
- Tom Steele – design
- Linda Tyler – assistant engineer

Performers

- Davis Barnett – viola
- Tony Bell Sr. – guitar
- George Bohanon & His Horn Section – horns
- Gary Coleman – vibraphone
- Jack Faith – alto & bass flutes
- Larry Gold – cello
- Bobbye Hall – congas
- Johnny Mathis – vocals
- Don Renaldo – violin
- Lee Ritenour – guitar
- Andrew Smith – drums
- Charles Veale & His String Section – strings
- Bob Zimmitti – vibraphone
- Bob Babbitt - Bass
- Mixed by Kaye-Smith Studios, Seattle, Washington
- Mastered at A&M Records, Hollywood, California

=== Real Gone Music reissue ===
From the liner notes for Life Is a Song Worth Singing: The Complete Thom Bell Sessions:

- Gordon Anderson – producer
- Joe Marchese - liner notes; compiler, producer
- Jeff James - Sony producer; compiling assistant
- Johnny Mathis - compiling assistant
- Tom D. Kline - design
- Michael Ochs Archives – photo
- Getty Images - photo
- Remastered by Sean Brennan at Battery Studios, New York City

== Bibliography ==
- Whitburn, Joel (2007), Joel Whitburn Presents Billboard Top Adult Songs, 1961-2006, Record Research Inc., ISBN 978-0898201697
- Whitburn, Joel (2010), Joel Whitburn Presents Top Pop Albums, Seventh Edition, Record Research Inc., ISBN 978-0-89820-183-3
