= Hot City =

Hot City may refer to:

- Hot City (Bonnie McKee album), 2024
- Hot City (Gene Page album), 1974
- Hot City, an album by the Sensational Alex Harvey Band recorded in 1974 and released in 2009
