= The Mathis Collection =

Compilation album by Johnny Mathis
- Released: 1977
- Recorded: 1956–1976
- Genre: AM pop; early pop/rock; vocal
- Length: 2:09:23
- Label: CBS

Johnny Mathis chronology
Mathis Is... (1977)	The Mathis Collection (1977)	Hold Me, Thrill Me, Kiss Me (1977)

The Mathis Collection is a compilation album by American pop singer Johnny Mathis that was released in the UK in 1977 by CBS Records. The subtitle on the cover reads, "40 of my favorite songs", and a statement from Mathis in the liner notes says, "Songs are very personal things. On this double album I have attempted to put together a collection of those which are most meaningful for me. I hope they mean as much to you." The compilation includes six of the 12 songs that had reached the UK singles chart by the time of its release ("A Certain Smile", "Winter Wonderland", "Someone", "Misty", "I'm Stone in Love with You", and his UK number one from 1976, "When a Child Is Born") but focuses mainly on album tracks.

The two-LP set entered the UK album chart on June 18, 1977, and stayed there for 39 weeks, four of which were spent in the number one position.

== Track listing ==
=== Side one ===
1. "We've Only Just Begun" (Roger Nichols, Paul Williams) – 3:08
2. "Everybody's Talkin'" (Fred Neil) – 3:02
3. "I'm Stone in Love with You" (Anthony Bell, Thom Bell, Linda Creed) – 3:30
4. "The Look of Love" (Burt Bacharach, Hal David) – 3:45
5. "The Way We Were" (Alan and Marilyn Bergman, Marvin Hamlisch) – 3:49
6. "Didn't We" (Jimmy Webb) – 2:49
7. "The Windmills of Your Mind" (A. Bergman, M. Bergman, Michel Legrand) – 3:34
8. "What I Did for Love" (Marvin Hamlisch, Edward Kleban) – 2:44
9. "Stardust" (Hoagy Carmichael, Mitchell Parish) – 3:27
10. "When a Child Is Born" (Ciro Dammicco, Fred Jay) – 3:41

=== Side two ===
1. "I'm Coming Home" (Thom Bell, Linda Creed) – 3:24
2. "Love Is Blue" (Brian Blackburn, Pierre Cour, André Popp) – 3:12
3. "Theme From 'Summer of 42' (The Summer Knows)" (A. Bergman, M. Bergman, Legrand) – 2:39
4. "Betcha by Golly, Wow" (Thom Bell, Linda Creed) – 2:49
5. "(Where Do I Begin) Love Story" (Francis Lai, Carl Sigman) – 2:46
6. "If" (David Gates) – 3:05
7. "Send in the Clowns" (Stephen Sondheim) – 3:35
8. "Speak Softly Love (Love Theme from 'The Godfather')" (Larry Kusik, Nino Rota) – 3:10
9. "And I Love You So" (Don McLean) – 3:26
10. "Feelings" (Morris Albert, Loulou Gasté) – 3:28

=== Side three ===
1. "A Certain Smile" (Sammy Fain, Paul Francis Webster) – 2:47
2. "Wonderful! Wonderful!" (Sherman Edwards, Ben Raleigh) – 2:50
3. "Someone" (William J. Tennyson Jr.) – 2:58
4. "Winter Wonderland" (Felix Bernard, Richard B. Smith) – 3:18
5. "The Twelfth of Never" (Jerry Livingston, Webster) – 2:28
6. "Misty" (Johnny Burke, Erroll Garner) – 3:34
7. "My Funny Valentine" (Richard Rodgers, Lorenz Hart) – 3:33
8. "I've Grown Accustomed to Her Face" (Alan Jay Lerner, Frederick Loewe) – 3:32
9. "Tonight" (Leonard Bernstein, Stephen Sondheim) – 3:16
10. "Maria" (Bernstein, Sondheim) – 3:45

=== Side four ===
1. "What Are You Doing the Rest of Your Life?" (A. Bergman, M. Bergman, Legrand) – 3:05
2. "A Man and a Woman" (Pierre Barouh, Jerry Keller, Lai) – 3:26
3. "Help Me Make It Through the Night" (Kris Kristofferson) – 3:16
4. "Moon River" (Henry Mancini, Johnny Mercer) – 3:08
5. "Raindrops Keep Fallin' on My Head" (Bacharach, David) – 2:37
6. "People" (Bob Merrill, Jule Styne) – 3:16
7. "On a Clear Day (You Can See Forever)" (Burton Lane, Alan Jay Lerner) – 2:49
8. "99 Miles from L.A." (David, Albert Hammond) – 3:35
9. "I'll Never Fall in Love Again" (Bacharach, David) – 3:03
10. "The Party's Over" (Styne, Adolph Green, Betty Comden) – 4:04

== Personnel ==
- Johnny Mathis – vocals
- David Pilton Advertising – design
- Roger Isaacson – art direction
- Frank Connor – photography
