= Different Kinda Different =

Studio album by Johnny Mathis
- Released: June 16, 1980
- Recorded: July 18, 1979; February 28, 1980; March 5, 1980; April 7, 1980
- Studio: A&M, Hollywood
- Genre: Vocal
- Length: 35:25
- Label: Columbia
- Producer: Jack Gold

Johnny Mathis chronology
Tears and Laughter (1980)	Different Kinda Different (1980)	The Best of Johnny Mathis 1975–1980 (1980)

Different Kinda Different is an album by American pop singer Johnny Mathis, released on June 16, 1980, by Columbia Records. It included covers of two standards ("Deep Purple", "Temptation") and two recent hits ("I Will Survive", "With You I'm Born Again"). It also continued the trend of recording duets with a female singer; for this project Paulette McWilliams (using the mononym Paulette) shared vocal duties on two of the six new songs.

The album was retitled All for You for its release in the UK, where it made it to number 20 during an eight-week run on the album chart that began the following month, on July 12. Different Kinda Different made its first appearance on Billboard magazine's Top LP's & Tapes chart in the issue dated August 9, 1980, and remained there for five weeks, peaking at number 164.

The title track from the album entered Billboard's list of the 100 most popular R&B songs in the US in the August 9 issue as well and got as high as number 81 during its four weeks there.

== Reception ==
Professional ratings
Review scores
Source	Rating
The Encyclopedia of Popular Music	2/5 stars

Billboard wrote, "His vocals are elegantly fluid, and the two duets with Paulette are especially fine. Mathis does fine cover versions of 'With You I'm Born Again', 'Deep Purple', and 'I Will Survive'."

== Track listing ==
=== Side one ===
1. "Different Kinda Different" performed with Paulette (Marilyn McLeod, Pam Sawyer) – 3:25
2. "With You I'm Born Again" from Fast Break (Carol Connors, David Shire) – 4:03
3. "I'll Do It All for You" performed with Paulette (Roger Cook, Steve Davis) – 3:29
4. "Never Givin' Up on You" (Steve Dorff, Jack Gold, Gary Harju, Larry Herbstritt) – 3:15
5. "Deep Purple" (Peter DeRose, Mitchell Parish) – 3:31

=== Side two ===
1. "I Will Survive" (Dino Fekaris, Freddie Perren) – 3:59
2. "Paradise" (Teddy Randazzo) – 3:07
3. "The Lights of Rio" (Arnold Goland, Jack Gold) – 3:50
4. "Love Without Words" (Sammy Cahn, John Lewis Parker) – 3:32
5. "Temptation" from Going Hollywood (Nacio Herb Brown, Arthur Freed) – 3:14

For the All for You album in the UK, a cover of "Three Times a Lady" was inserted at the end of side one, but the order of the original 10 songs was unchanged. This additional track would make its US debut on Mathis's 1981 compilation The First 25 Years – The Silver Anniversary Album.

=== 2017 CD bonus tracks ===
This album's CD release as part of the 2017 box set The Voice of Romance: The Columbia Original Album Collection included "Three Times a Lady" as one of five bonus tracks, the other four of which had not been available before:

- "In Love with Love" (Jimmy Scott) – 3:19
- "Time for Love" (Don Ferris, Jack Lloyd) – 4:23
- "Wondering Why" (Ainsworth Prasad, Tamra Smith) – 3:38
- "When Am I Going to Get Over You" (unknown) – 3:30
- "Three Times a Lady" (Lionel Richie) – 4:15

== Recording dates ==
From the liner notes for The Voice of Romance: The Columbia Original Album Collection:

- July 18, 1979 – "Deep Purple"
- November 27, 1979 – "In Love with Love", "Time for Love", "Wondering Why"
- December 6, 1979 – "When Am I Going to Get Over You"
- February 28, 1980 – "I'll Do It All for You", "Love Without Words", "Never Givin' Up on You"
- March 5, 1980 – "I Will Survive", "Paradise", "Temptation"
- April 7, 1980 – "Different Kinda Different", "The Lights of Rio", "Three Times a Lady", "With You I'm Born Again"

== Song information ==
The Billy Preston-Syreeta duet "With You I'm Born Again" was written for the 1979 film Fast Break and reached number four on Billboard magazine's Hot 100, number two on its list of the 50 most popular Adult Contemporary songs in the US, number 86 on its R&B chart, and number two in the UK. Larry Clinton & His Orchestra's recording of "Deep Purple" with Bea Wain on vocal spent nine weeks at number one in Billboard in 1939. "I Will Survive" by Gloria Gaynor lasted for three weeks at number one pop and four weeks in the top spot in the UK in addition to making it to number four R&B and number nine Adult Contemporary; the song also earned the Grammy Award for Best Disco Recording and Platinum certification from the Recording Industry Association of America. And Bing Crosby had the most successful version of the three different recordings of "Temptation" that charted early in 1934 when he peaked at number three.

== Personnel ==
From the liner notes for the original album:

- Johnny Mathis – vocals
- Paulette McWilliams – vocals ("Different Kinda Different", "I'll Do It All for You")
- Jack Gold – producer
- Gene Page – arranger, conductor (except as noted)
- Victor Vanacore – arranger, conductor ("I Will Survive")
- Dick Bogert – engineer
- Jo-Anne Steinberg – production coordinator
- David Vance – photographer
- Nancy Donald – design
- Gary Herbig – saxophone solo ("I'll Do It All for You")
- Ernie Watts – saxophone solo ("Deep Purple")
- Chris Bennett – carnival girl ("The Lights of Rio")
- Mixed at A&M Recording Studios, Hollywood, California

== Bibliography ==
- O'Neil, Thomas (1999), The Grammys, Perigree Books, ISBN 0399524770
- Whitburn, Joel (1986), Joel Whitburn's Pop Memories, 1890-1954, Record Research Inc., ISBN 0898200830
- Whitburn, Joel (2004), Joel Whitburn Presents Top R&B/Hip-Hop Singles, 1942-2004, Record Research Inc., ISBN 0898201608
- Whitburn, Joel (2007), Joel Whitburn Presents Billboard Top Adult Songs, 1961-2006, Record Research Inc., ISBN 978-0898201697
- Whitburn, Joel (2009), Joel Whitburn's Top Pop Singles, 1955-2008, Record Research Inc., ISBN 978-0898201802
- Whitburn, Joel (2010), Joel Whitburn Presents Top Pop Albums, Seventh Edition, Record Research Inc., ISBN 978-0-89820-183-3
