= Close Encounters =

Close Encounters may refer to:

- Close encounter, an event in which a person witnesses an unidentified flying object
- Close Encounter (album), an album by Franco Ambrosetti, 1978
- Close Encounters (Teddy Edwards and Houston Person album), 1999
- Close Encounters (Gene Page album), 1978
- "Close Encounters" (Murdoch Mysteries), a 2022 television episode
- "Close Encounters" (A Touch of Frost), a 2003 television episode
- "Close Encounters", an episode of Naked Science
- Close Encounters, an album by the Belgian band Clouseau, 1991

== See also ==
- Close Encounters of the Third Kind, a 1977 American science fiction film by Steven Spielberg
- Alien Encounters (disambiguation)
