= Song Sung Blue (album) =

Studio album by Johnny Mathis
- Released: September 13, 1972
- Recorded: April 3, 1972; June 7, 1972; June 21, 1972; July 24, 1972; July 28, 1972
- Genre: AM pop; early pop/rock; vocal pop
- Length: 37:37
- Label: Columbia
- Producer: Jerry Fuller

Johnny Mathis chronology
Johnny Mathis' All-Time Greatest Hits (1972)	Song Sung Blue (1972)	Me and Mrs. Jones (1973)

Professional ratings
Review scores
Source	Rating
Billboard	positive
The Encyclopedia of Popular Music	3/5 stars

Song Sung Blue is an album by American pop singer Johnny Mathis that was released on September 13, 1972, by Columbia Records and featured his renditions of mostly recent chart hits.

The album made its first appearance on Billboard magazine's Top LP's & Tapes chart in the issue dated October 21, 1972, and remained there for 18 weeks, peaking at number 83.. It debuted on the Cash Box albums chart in the issue dated October 28, 1972, and remained on the chart for 15 weeks, peaking at number 91. In the UK it was retitled Make It Easy on Yourself and reached number 49 on the album chart.

The song "Make It Easy on Yourself" was the first single from the album and "bubbled under" the Billboard Hot 100 to number 103 while making it as high as number 16 on the magazine's Easy Listening chart. The song on the flip side, "Sometimes", was written by Henry Mancini and his daughter Felice but was not included on the LP.

== Reception ==
In their capsule review, Billboard enthusiastically announced that "this one is by far one of his best!" They also singled out certain tracks. "Along with 'Song Sung Blue' and 'Play Me', Mathis is in great voice on 'Run to Me', 'Where Is the Love', 'How Can I Be Sure', and 'Alone Again (Naturally)', and he's truly at home with 'Too Young'."

== Track listing ==
=== Side one ===
1. "Play Me" (Neil Diamond) – 3:49
2. "Alone Again (Naturally)" (Gilbert O'Sullivan) – 4:20
3. "Where Is the Love" (Ralph MacDonald, William Salter) – 2:32
4. "Goodbye to Love" (John Bettis, Richard Carpenter) – 3:12
5. "Too Young" (Sylvia Dee, Sidney Lippman) – 3:16

=== Side two ===
1. "Make It Easy on Yourself" (Burt Bacharach, Hal David) – 3:29
2. "Lean on Me" (Bill Withers) – 3:51
3. "How Can I Be Sure" (Felix Cavaliere, Eddie Brigati) – 3:42
4. "Run to Me" (Barry Gibb, Maurice Gibb, Robin Gibb) – 2:58
5. "Song Sung Blue" (Neil Diamond) – 3:12
6. "He Ain't Heavy, He's My Brother" (Bob Russell, Bobby Scott) – 3:16

=== 2017 CD bonus tracks ===
This album's CD release as part of the 2017 box set The Voice of Romance: The Columbia Original Album Collection included two bonus tracks that were previously unavailable:

- "Morning Has Broken" (Eleanor Farjeon, Cat Stevens) – 3:40
- "I'm on the Outside Looking In" (Teddy Randazzo, Bobby Weinstein) – 3:05

== Recording dates ==
From the liner notes for The Voice of Romance: The Columbia Original Album Collection:

- April 3, 1972 – "Make It Easy on Yourself"
- June 7, 1972 – "How Can I Be Sure", "Morning Has Broken", "Song Sung Blue"
- June 21, 1972 – "He Ain't Heavy, He's My Brother", "Too Young", "Where Is the Love"
- July 24, 1972 – "Alone Again (Naturally)", "I'm on the Outside Looking In", "Lean on Me"
- July 28, 1972 – "Goodbye to Love", "Play Me", "Run to Me"

== Song information ==
Neil Diamond's "Play Me" reached number 11 on the Billboard Hot 100 and spent two weeks at number three on the magazine's Easy Listening chart. "Alone Again (Naturally)" by Gilbert O'Sullivan enjoyed six weeks at number one on both of those charts, got as high as number three in the UK, and earned Gold certification from the Recording Industry Association of America. "Where Is the Love" had its biggest success as a duet by Roberta Flack and Donny Hathaway that spent a week in the top spot on the magazine's Easy Listening and R&B charts, reached number five pop and number 29 UK, earned Gold certification from the RIAA, and won the Grammy Award for Best Pop Vocal Performance by a Duo, Group or Chorus.

"Goodbye to Love" was a number seven pop hit for The Carpenters that also reached number two Easy Listening and number nine in the UK. "Too Young" had the most success as a recording by Nat King Cole that spent five weeks at number one in Billboard magazine in 1951. "Make It Easy on Yourself" had its first chart success as a 1962 hit for Jerry Butler that reached number 20 pop and number 18 R&B. Another Gold record, "Lean on Me" by Bill Withers had its best showing on the pop chart with three weeks at number one compared to just one week at the top of the R&B chart and peak positions at number four Easy Listening and number 18 UK.

The first chart appearance of "How Can I Be Sure" was by The Young Rascals, who took the song to number four on the Billboard Hot 100. "Run to Me" by The Bee Gees made it to number 16 on that same chart as well as number six Easy Listening. Diamond's Gold record "Song Sung Blue" was number one for seven weeks Easy Listening and one week on the pop chart in addition to reaching number 14 in the UK. He also had the best Easy Listening showing of "He Ain't Heavy, He's My Brother", which he took to number four, but his peak position with the song at number 20 on the Hot 100 fell short of the number seven spot that The Hollies attained with their original recording of the song that was released in 1969 and had also been to number three in the UK by the time that Mathis released this album.

== Personnel ==
- Johnny Mathis - vocals
- Jerry Fuller - producer
- D'Arneill Pershing - arranger
- Peter Romano - engineer
- Ed Caraeff - photos

== Bibliography ==
- O'Neil, Thomas (1999). The Grammys. Perigree Books. ISBN 0-399-52477-0.
- Whitburn, Joel (1986). Joel Whitburn's Pop Memories, 1890-1954. Record Research Inc. ISBN 0898200830.
- Whitburn, Joel (2002). Joel Whitburn's Top Country Singles, 1944-2001. Record Research Inc. ISBN 0-89820-151-9.
- Whitburn, Joel (2004). Joel Whitburn Presents Top R&B/Hip-Hop Singles, 1942-2004. Record Research Inc. ISBN 0-89820-160-8.
- Whitburn, Joel (2007). Joel Whitburn Presents Billboard Top Adult Songs, 1961-2006. Record Research Inc. ISBN 978-0898201697.
- Whitburn, Joel (2009). Joel Whitburn's Top Pop Singles, 1955-2008. Record Research Inc. ISBN 978-0-89820-180-2.
- Whitburn, Joel (2010). Joel Whitburn Presents Top Pop Albums, Seventh Edition. Record Research Inc. ISBN 978-0-89820-183-3.
- Hoffmann, Frank W (1988). The Cash box album charts, 1955-1974. Scarecrow Press. ISBN 0-8108-2005-6.
