= Lovelock! =

Studio album by Gene Page
- Released: 1976
- Recorded: 1976
- Studio: The Sound Factory, Hollywood, California
- Genre: Soul; disco
- Length: 32:39
- Label: Atlantic
- Producer: Billy Page

Gene Page chronology
Hot City (1974)	Lovelock! (1976)	Close Encounters (1978)

Professional ratings
Review scores
Source	Rating
AllMusic	2/5 stars

Lovelock! is the second album by Gene Page, released in 1976. It was produced by Billy Page.

== Track listing ==
1. "Wild Cherry" (Billy Page, Ray Parker Jr.) – 3:52
2. "Organ Grinder" (Billy Page, Gene Page) – 4:37
3. "Higher, My Love" (Billy Page, Gene Page) – 4:30
4. "Together - Whatever" (Gene Page, Louis Johnson, Melvin Ragin, Rasputin Bantte) – 3:40
5. "Fantasy Woman" (Billy Page, Gene Page) – 4:16
6. "Into My Thing" (Gene Page) – 3:59
7. "Straw in the Mind" (Billy Page) – 3:59
8. "Escape to Disco" (Gene Page) – 3:46

== Personnel ==
- Ed Greene – drums
- Wilton Felder – bass
- Henry Davis – bass
- Ray Parker Jr. – guitar
- Dean Parks – guitar
- Melvin Wah Wah Watson – guitar
- Lee Ritenour – guitar
- David T. Walker – guitar
- Joe Sample – piano
- Gene Page – keyboards
- Tom Hensley – keyboards
- Reginald Sonny Burke – keyboards
- Michel Rubini – keyboards
- Clark Spangler – Arp programmer
- Gary Coleman – percussion
- Bobbye Hall – congas
- Ernie Watts – tenor and alto saxophone solos
- George Bohanon – trombone solos
- Oscar Brashear – trumpet solos
- Plas Johnson – tenor saxophone solos
- Jim Horn – flute solos
- Tom Scott – flute, tenor and alto saxophone solos
- Harry Bluestone – concertmaster
- Merry Clayton – vocals
- Jim Gilstrap – vocals
- Augie Johnson – vocals
- Carolyn Willis – vocals
- John Lehman – vocals
- Louis Patton – vocals
- Gregory Matta – vocals
- Edna Wright – vocals

Technical

- David Hassinger – engineer
- Jim Nipar – assistant engineer
- Sound Factory, Hollywood, California
- Gene Page & Billy Page – producers
