= Me and Mrs. Jones (album) =

Studio album by Johnny Mathis
- Released: January 1973
- Recorded: June 30, 1971; September 28, 1972; December 5, 1972; December 12, 1972; December 21, 1972
- Genre: AM pop; early pop/rock; vocal pop
- Length: 41:23
- Label: Columbia
- Producer: Jerry Fuller

Johnny Mathis chronology
Song Sung Blue (1972)	Me and Mrs. Jones (1973)	Killing Me Softly with Her Song (1973)

Professional ratings
Review scores
Source	Rating
Billboard	positive
The Encyclopedia of Popular Music	3/5 stars

Me and Mrs. Jones is an album by American pop singer Johnny Mathis that was released in January 1973 by Columbia Records. While it does cover several big chart hits of the day like his last album, Song Sung Blue, did, it also includes songs that didn't make the US Top 40 ("Remember", "You're a Lady") or had never charted ("Happy", "I Was Born in Love with You", "Summer Me, Winter Me").

The album made its first appearance on Billboard magazine's Top LP's & Tapes chart in the issue dated February 17, 1973, and remained there for 14 weeks, peaking at number 83. it also debuted on the Cash Box albums chart in the issue dated February 17, 1973, and remained on the chart for 13 weeks, peaking at number 59.

The medley of "Soul and Inspiration" and "Just Once in My Life" was released as a single and reached number 37 on Billboard's Easy Listening chart.

== Reception ==
Billboard gave the album a positive review. "Mathis's power as a standout interpreter of material continues to amaze." They detailed the specifics that impressed them as well. "The tempo is slow and romantic; his voice sweet and flowing. The backings are full and broad sounding. Mathis's special sound is razor-sharp as an instrument of romantic interludes."

Record World believed that this is "Another beautiful gathering of the latest and best MOR music around, as up to date as could be."

== Track listing ==
=== Side one ===
1. "Me and Mrs. Jones" (Kenny Gamble, Cary Gilbert, Leon Huff) – 4:10
2. "Sweet Surrender" (David Gates) – 2:35
3. "Summer Breeze" (Dash Crofts, Jim Seals) – 4:02
4. "Corner of the Sky" from Pippin (Stephen Schwartz) – 3:27
5. "Happy (Love Theme from Lady Sings the Blues)" from Lady Sings the Blues (Michel Legrand, Smokey Robinson) – 3:36
6. Medley – 3:33
  a. "Soul and Inspiration" (Barry Mann, Cynthia Weil)
  b. "Just Once in My Life" (Gerry Goffin, Carole King, Phil Spector)

=== Side two ===
1. "Don't Let Me Be Lonely Tonight" (James Taylor) – 3:21
2. "If I Could Reach You" (Randy McNeill) – 3:16
3. "Remember" (Harry Nilsson) – 4:35
4. "You're a Lady" (Peter Skellern) – 5:10
5. Medley – 3:38
  a. "I Was Born in Love with You" from Wuthering Heights (1970) (Alan Bergman, Marilyn Bergman, Michel Legrand)
  b. "Summer Me, Winter Me" (A. Bergman, M. Bergman, Legrand)

=== 2017 CD bonus track ===
This album's CD release as part of the 2017 box set The Voice of Romance: The Columbia Original Album Collection included a bonus track that was previously unavailable:

- "Pieces of April" (Dave Loggins) – 3:17

== Recording dates ==
From the liner notes for The Voice of Romance: The Columbia Original Album Collection:

- June 30, 1971 – "I Was Born in Love with You/Summer Me, Winter Me"
- September 28, 1972 – "Soul and Inspiration/Just Once in My Life"
- October 2, 1972 – "Pieces of April"
- December 5, 1972 – "Don't Let Me Be Lonely Tonight", "Summer Breeze"
- December 12, 1972 – "If I Could Reach You", "Me and Mrs. Jones", "Remember"
- December 21, 1972 – "Corner of the Sky", "Sweet Surrender", "You're a Lady"
- unknown – "Happy (Love Theme from Lady Sings the Blues)"

== Song information ==
"Me and Mrs. Jones" by Billy Paul enjoyed four weeks at number one on Billboard's R&B chart and three weeks in the top spot on the magazine's Hot 100, made it to number 10 on its Easy Listening chart and number 12 in the UK, received Gold certification from the Recording Industry Association of America, and earned Paul the Grammy Award for Best R&B Vocal Performance, Male. Bread's "Sweet Surrender" spent two weeks at number one Easy Listening and reached number 15 pop. Seals and Crofts took "Summer Breeze" to number four Easy Listening and number six on the Hot 100. "Corner of the Sky" comes from the Broadway musical Pippin and was a number nine R&B hit for The Jackson 5 that also made it to number 18 pop.

Mathis selected two Righteous Brothers songs for a medley: "Soul and Inspiration" spent three weeks at number one on the Billboard Hot 100, got as high as number 13 R&B and number 15 UK, and received Gold certification from the RIAA; and "Just Once in My Life" made it to number nine pop and number 26 R&B. James Taylor's "Don't Let Me Be Lonely Tonight" peaked at number 14 on the Hot 100 and number three Easy Listening. "If I Could Reach You" by The 5th Dimension spent a week at number one on the Easy Listening chart and reached number 10 on the pop chart. "Remember" was released by Nilsson as "Remember (Christmas)", which got as high as number 21 Easy Listening and number 53 pop.

"You're a Lady" had its biggest chart success as recorded by Peter Skellern, who took the song to number 50 pop, number 11 Easy Listening, and number three in the UK. And Mathis closes the album with a medley of two songs that have music by Michel Legrand and lyrics by Alan and Marilyn Bergman and that he would later rerecord separately for his 1993 album How Do You Keep the Music Playing?, which paid salute to the songwriting trio: "I Was Born in Love with You" was recorded by the Mike Curb Congregation for the soundtrack album of the 1970 adaptation of Wuthering Heights, and "Summer Me, Winter Me" was first recorded by Barbra Streisand in 1970 but not released until it was included on her 1974 album The Way We Were.

== Personnel ==
From the liner notes of the original album:

- Johnny Mathis - vocals
- Jerry Fuller - producer
- Jack Gold - executive producer
- Larry Muhoberac - arranger ("Corner of the Sky", "You're a Lady")
- D'Arneill Pershing - arranger (except as noted)
- Roy Gerhardt - recording engineer
- Barry Rudolph - vocal and mixing engineer (except as noted)
- Peter Romano - vocal and mixing engineer ("Me and Mrs. Jones", "If I Could Reach You"), engineer ("I Was Born in Love with You"/"Summer Me, Winter Me")
- Horn/Griner - cover photograph
- Ron Coro - art direction
- Nancy Donald - design

== Bibliography ==
- O'Neil, Thomas (1999), The Grammys, Perigree Books, ISBN 0-399-52477-0
- Whitburn, Joel (2004), Joel Whitburn Presents Top R&B/Hip-Hop Singles, 1942-2004, Record Research Inc., ISBN 0-89820-160-8
- Whitburn, Joel (2007), Joel Whitburn Presents Billboard Top Adult Songs, 1961-2006, Record Research Inc., ISBN 978-0898201697
- Whitburn, Joel (2009), Joel Whitburn's Top Pop Singles, 1955-2008, Record Research Inc., ISBN 978-0-89820-180-2
- Whitburn, Joel (2010), Joel Whitburn Presents Top Pop Albums, Seventh Edition, Record Research Inc., ISBN 978-0-89820-183-3
- Hoffmann, Frank W (1988), The Cash box album charts, 1955-1974, Scarecrow Press, ISBN 0-810-82005-6
