= Alien Encounters =

Alien Encounters may refer to:

- Alien Encounters (comics), an American science fiction anthology comic book
- Alien Encounters (TV series) a science fiction mini series
- Starship Invasions, also released as Alien Encounter, a 1977 Canadian science fiction film

== See also ==
- Close Encounters (disambiguation)
