= Friends in Love (Johnny Mathis album) =

Studio album by Johnny Mathis
- Released: April 5, 1982
- Recorded: July 10, 1981; September 2, 1981; October 21, 1981; November 3, 1981; January 1982
- Studio: A&M, Hollywood; Garden Rake, Sherman Oaks; Sound Labs, Los Angeles; Lion Share, Los Angeles
- Genre: R&B; vocal; pop/rock
- Length: 35:25
- Label: Columbia
- Producer: Barry Fasman; Jack Gold; Jay Graydon

Johnny Mathis chronology
Celebration – The Anniversary Album (1981)	Friends in Love (1982)	Unforgettable – A Musical Tribute to Nat King Cole (1983)

Friends in Love is an album by American pop singer Johnny Mathis that was released on April 5, 1982, by Columbia Records and included six original songs, two of which were duets with Dionne Warwick.

The album made its first appearance on Billboard magazine's Top LP's & Tapes chart in the issue dated May 8, 1982, and remained there for nine weeks, peaking at number 147. It also made it to number 34 during a seven-week run on the UK album chart that began the following week, on May 15.

Professional ratings
Review scores
Source	Rating
The Encyclopedia of Popular Music	3/5 stars

The title track from the album entered the Billboard Hot 100 in the issue dated April 17, 1982, and eventually got as high as number 38 over the course of 13 weeks. That same issue included its debut on the magazine's list of the 100 most popular R&B songs in the US, where it also spent 13 weeks but reached number 22. The next issue, dated April 24, marked its first appearance on the Adult Contemporary chart, and during its 17-week run, it rose to number five.

This is the first Mathis album whose initial release included the compact disc (CD) format.

== Track listing ==
From the liner notes for the original album:

1. "Got You Where I Want You" performed with Dionne Warwick (Jim Andron, Candy Parton) – 3:43
  - Jay Graydon – producer, arranger, conductor, engineer
  - Recorded at Garden Rake Studios; Ian Eales – engineer
2. "I Remember You and Me" (Jim Andron, Candy Parton) – 3:46
  - Jack Gold – producer
  - Artie Butler – arranger, conductor
  - Recorded at Lion Share Recording Studios; Armin Steiner – engineer
  - Mixed at A&M Recording Studios; Dick Bogert – engineer
3. "When the Lovin' Goes Out of the Lovin'" (Richard Parker, Bobby Whiteside) – 4:19
  - Barry Fasman – producer, rhythm and strings arranger
  - Charles Koppelman – executive producer
  - Recorded at Sound Lab Studios; John Arrias – engineer
  - Stuart Whitmore – assistant engineer
4. "Somethin's Goin' On" (Norman Sallitt) – 3:21
  - Jack Gold – producer
  - Arnold Goland – arranger, conductor
  - Recorded at Lion Share Recording Studios; Armin Steiner – engineer
  - Mixed at A&M Recording Studios; Dick Bogert – engineer
5. "What Do You Do with the Love" (Richard Kerr, Candy Parton) – 3:28
  - Jack Gold – producer
  - Gene Page – arranger, conductor
  - Recorded at Lion Share Recording Studios; Armin Steiner – engineer
  - Mixed at A&M Recording Studios; Dick Bogert – engineer
6. "Friends in Love" performed with Dionne Warwick (Bill Champlin, David Foster, Jay Graydon) – 4:03
  - Jay Graydon – producer, arranger, conductor, engineer
  - Recorded at Garden Rake Studios; Ian Eales – engineer
7. "What's Forever For" (Rafe Van Hoy) – 3:22
  - Jack Gold – producer
  - Gene Page – arranger, conductor
  - Recorded at Lion Share Recording Studios; Reggie Dozier – engineer
  - Mixed at A&M Recording Studios; Dick Bogert – engineer
8. "Warm" (David Buskin) – 4:39
  - Jack Gold – producer
  - Gene Page – arranger, conductor
  - Recorded at Lion Share Recording Studios; Armin Steiner – engineer
  - Mixed at A&M Recording Studios; Dick Bogert – engineer
9. "Memory" from Cats (T. S. Eliot, Trevor Nunn, Andrew Lloyd Webber) – 3:00
  - Jack Gold – producer
  - Gene Page – arranger, conductor
  - Recorded at Lion Share Recording Studios; Reggie Dozier – engineer
  - Mixed at A&M Recording Studios; Dick Bogert – engineer
10. "Lately" (Stevie Wonder) – 4:05
  - Jack Gold – producer
  - Gene Page – arranger, conductor
  - Recorded at Lion Share Recording Studios; Reggie Dozier – engineer
  - Mixed at A&M Recording Studios; Dick Bogert – engineer

=== 2017 CD bonus tracks ===
This album's CD release as part of the 2017 box set The Voice of Romance: The Columbia Original Album Collection included six bonus tracks that were previously unavailable:

- "We Kiss in a Shadow" (Oscar Hammerstein II, Richard Rodgers) – 3:37
- "Cryin' for the Night" (unknown) – 4:43
- "Goodbye for Now" from Reds (Stephen Sondheim) – 3:22
- "The One and Only" from The One and Only (Alan and Marilyn Bergman, Patrick Williams) – 3:17
- "Here's to You" (Bob Geldof) – 5:05
- "As If" (Shelly Peiken, Guy Roche) – 4:17

== Recording dates ==
From the liner notes for The Voice of Romance: The Columbia Original Album Collection:

- July 10, 1981 – "Lately", "Memory", "What's Forever For"
- September 1, 1981 – "Cryin' for the Night", "Goodbye for Now", "We Kiss in a Shadow"
- September 2, 1981 – "The One and Only", "When the Lovin' Goes Out of the Lovin'"
- October 21, 1981 – "As If", "Here's to You", "Warm"
- November 3, 1981 – "I Remember You and Me", "Somethin's Goin' On", "What Do You Do with the Love"
- January 1982 – "Friends in Love", "Got You Where I Want You"

== Song information ==
Ray, Goodman & Brown recorded "When the Lovin' Goes Out of the Lovin'" for their 1981 album Stay. "What's Forever For" appeared on the 1978 album Dr. Heckle and Mr. Jive by England Dan and John Ford Coley, but Michael Martin Murphey also released a recording of the song in 1982 that went to number 19 pop and number four Adult Contemporary and spent a week at number one on Billboard's Country chart. "Memory" originated in the 1981 Broadway musical Cats and became a number six hit in the UK for Elaine Paige that same year. And Stevie Wonder's "Lately" reached number three in the UK and number 29 R&B, number 33 Adult Contemporary, and number 64 on the Hot 100 in the US.

== Personnel ==
From the liner notes for the original album:

- Johnny Mathis – vocals
- Dionne Warwick – vocals ("Friends in Love", "Got You Where I Want You")
- David Vance – photographer

== Bibliography ==
- O'Neil, Thomas (1999), The Grammys, Perigree Books, ISBN 0399524770
- Whitburn, Joel (2002), Joel Whitburn's Top Country Singles, 1944-2001, Record Research Inc., ISBN 0898201519
- Whitburn, Joel (2004), Joel Whitburn Presents Top R&B/Hip-Hop Singles, 1942-2004, Record Research Inc., ISBN 0898201608
- Whitburn, Joel (2007), Joel Whitburn Presents Billboard Top Adult Songs, 1961-2006, Record Research Inc., ISBN 978-0898201697
- Whitburn, Joel (2009), Joel Whitburn's Top Pop Singles, 1955-2008, Record Research Inc., ISBN 978-0898201802
- Whitburn, Joel (2010), Joel Whitburn Presents Top Pop Albums, Seventh Edition, Record Research Inc., ISBN 978-0-89820-183-3
