= Unforgettable – A Musical Tribute to Nat King Cole =

Live album by Johnny Mathis
- Released: 1983
- Recorded: May 20, 1983
- Studios: BBC Television Theatre, London, England
- Genres: Vocal; stage & screen
- Length: 44:31
- Label: Columbia

Johnny Mathis chronology
Friends in Love (1982)	Unforgettable – A Musical Tribute to Nat King Cole (1983)	A Special Part of Me (1984)

Unforgettable – A Musical Tribute to Nat King Cole is a soundtrack album released in the UK in 1983 by the CBS Records division of Columbia in conjunction with the broadcast of American pop singer Johnny Mathis's BBC television concert special of the same name that featured Cole's daughter Natalie. The front of the original album jacket credits the concert performers as "Johnny Mathis and Natalie Cole", whereas the CD booklet reads, "Johnny Mathis with special guest Natalie Cole".

The LP entered the UK album chart on September 17, 1983, and reached number five over the course of 16 weeks, and the following month, on October 31, the British Phonographic Industry awarded the album with Gold certification for sales of 100,000 units in the UK.

In the liner notes on the original album sleeve Natalie Cole writes, "It was an honor to work with an artist of the stature of Johnny Mathis, one of the few artists in the world whom I feel can do justice to my father's music."

== Track listing ==
From the liner notes for the original album:

1. "Unforgettable" (instrumental)/"Sweet Lorraine" (Irving Gordon/Cliff Burwell, Mitchell Parish) – 3:12
  - Ronnie Hazlehurst – arranger
2. "Nature Boy" (Eden Ahbez) – 3:27
  - Neil Richardson – arranger
3. "Orange Colored Sky" (Milton DeLugg, Willie Stein) – 2:11
  - Allyn Ferguson – arranger
4. "Too Young" (Sylvia Dee, Sidney Lippman) – 3:19
  - D'Arneill Pershing – arranger
5. Medley – 5:50
  a. "Route 66" (Bobby Troup)
  b. "(I Love You) For Sentimental Reasons" (Deek Watson, William Best)
  c. "Red Sails in the Sunset" (Hugh Williams, Jimmy Kennedy)
  d. "Walkin' My Baby Back Home" (Fred E. Ahlert, Roy Turk)
  e. "It's Only a Paper Moon" (Harold Arlen, E. Y. Harburg, Billy Rose)
  - Ronnie Hazlehurst – arranger
6. "Stardust" (Hoagy Carmichael, Mitchell Parish) – 3:24
  - Brian Rogers – arranger (original arrangement by Gordon Jenkins)
7. "Unforgettable" (instrumental) (Irving Gordon) – 0:12
  - Ronnie Hazlehurst – arranger
8. Medley (solo performance by Natalie Cole) – 6:20
  a. "Straighten Up and Fly Right" (Nat King Cole, Irving Mills)
  b. "Mona Lisa" (Ray Evans, Jay Livingston)
  c. "L-O-V-E" (Milt Gabler, Bert Kaempfert)
  d. "Dance, Ballerina, Dance" a.k.a. "Ballerina" (Bob Russell, Carl Sigman)
  e. "Ramblin' Rose" (Joe Sherman, Noel Sherman)
  f. "The Christmas Song" (Bob Wells, Mel Torme)
  - Joe Guercio – arranger
9. "To the Ends of the Earth" (Joe Sherman, Noel Sherman) – 3:27
  - D'Arneill Pershing – arranger
10. "That Sunday, That Summer" (Joe Sherman, George David Weiss) – 3:22
  - Ronnie Hazlehurst – arranger (original arrangement by Ralph Carmichael)
11. Medley (performed with Natalie Cole) – 5:42
  a. "Let There Be Love" (Ian Grant, Lionel Rand)
  b. "When I Fall in Love" (Edward Heyman, Victor Young)
  - Neil Richardson – arranger (original arrangement of "Let There Be Love" by Ralph Carmichael and George Shearing)
12. "Unforgettable" (Irving Gordon) – 4:05
  - Allyn Ferguson – arranger

== Personnel ==
From the liner notes for the original album:

Performers

- Johnny Mathis – vocals
- Natalie Cole – vocals ("The Christmas Song", "Dance, Ballerina, Dance", "Let There Be Love", " L-O-V-E", "Mona Lisa", "Ramblin' Rose", "Straighten Up and Fly Right", "When I Fall in Love")
- Levine Andrade – strings
- Michael Bach – bass
- Kenny Baker – trumpet
- Norris Bosworth – strings
- Robin Firman – strings
- John Franca – strings
- Hans Geiger – strings
- Bill Geldard – brass
- John Graham – strings
- Chris Green – strings
- John Huckridge – brass
- Maurice Isaacs – strings
- Homi Kanga – strings
- Gary Kettel – percussion
- Bobby Lamb – trombone
- Laurie Lewis – strings
- Joe Lizama – drums
- Eddie Mordue – saxophone
- Thelma Owen – harp
- Bill Reid – strings
- Cyril Reuben – brass
- George Robertson – strings
- Gil Rogers – guitar
- Jack Rothstein – strings (leader)
- Celia Sheen – strings
- Bill Skeat – brass
- Wally Smith – brass
- Hubert Staar – brass
- Larry Steelman – keyboards
- Derek Watkins – trumpet
- John Willison – strings
- Peter Willison – strings
- Roy Willox – brass
- Manny Winter – brass

Production

- Jim Ganduglia – musical director
- Yvonne Littlewood – television producer
- Len Shorey – television sound supervisor
- Hugh Attwooll – mixer
- Mike Ross – mixer
- Rob O'Connor (Stylo Rouge) – sleeve design
- Viv Mabon – illustration
- David Vance – photographer
- Mixed at CBS Studios, London

== Bibliography ==
- Whitburn, Joel (1986), Joel Whitburn's Pop Memories, 1890-1954, Record Research Inc., ISBN 0898200830
- Whitburn, Joel (1994), Joel Whitburn's Pop Hits, 1940-1954, Record Research Inc., ISBN 0898201063
- Whitburn, Joel (2002), Joel Whitburn's Top Country Singles, 1944-2001, Record Research Inc., ISBN 0898201519
- Whitburn, Joel (2004), Joel Whitburn Presents Top R&B/Hip-Hop Singles, 1942-2004, Record Research Inc., ISBN 0898201608
- Whitburn, Joel (2007), Joel Whitburn Presents Billboard Top Adult Songs, 1961-2006, Record Research Inc., ISBN 0898201691
- Whitburn, Joel (2009), Joel Whitburn's Top Pop Singles, 1955-2008, Record Research Inc., ISBN 0898201802
