= Love Starts After Dark =

Studio album by Gene Page
- Released: 1980
- Recorded: 1980
- Genre: Soul/Disco
- Length: 37:49
- Label: Arista
- Producer: Billy Page, Gene Page

Gene Page chronology
Close Encounters (1978)	Love Starts After Dark (1980)

Professional ratings
Review scores
Source	Rating
Allmusic	link

Love Starts After Dark is the fourth and final album by Gene Page. It was produced by Billy Page and Gene Page.

== Track listing ==
1. "Love Starts After Dark" (Leon Sylvers) 5:32
2. "With You in the Night" (Herb Alpert, Leon Ware) 4:00
3. "Put a Little Love in You Lovin'" (Ray Parker Jr.) 5:40
4. "Second Time Around" (Emmett North, Robert Jackson, Tony Churchill) 4:50
5. "You are the Meaning of this Song" (Leon Sylvers III, Nidra Beard) 3:33
6. "Hold On to That Groove" (Eddie Watkins, Phyllis St. James) 5:54
7. "Hollywood" (Joe Sample, Will Jennings) 4:35
8. "I Wanna Dance" (Jack Gerard, Lon Van Eaton) 3:45
