= The 5th Dimension / Live!! =

Seventh album from The 5th Dimension

Live album by The 5th Dimension
- Released: October 1971
- Recorded: Caesars Palace, Las Vegas, Nevada
- Venue: Caesars Palace main theater
- Label: Bell
- Producer: Bones Howe

The 5th Dimension chronology
Reflections (1971)	The 5th Dimension / Live!! (1971)	Individually & Collectively (1971)

Professional ratings
Review scores
Source	Rating
AllMusic	4/5 stars

The 5th Dimension / Live!! is the seventh album by the American pop group the 5th Dimension, and their first live recorded album. It was released in October 1971. The 5th Dimension / Live!! reached No. 32 on the Billboard Top LPs chart, and was certified Gold by the RIAA. Originally released as a double album on vinyl, the album was recorded by the mobile unit of Wally Heider Studios, Los Angeles, California. Release formats: 2xLP, MC, 8-track, reel-to-reel.

Two singles were released from the album in the United States:

- "Never My Love" b/w "A Love Like Ours" (from the previous Portrait album), which peaked at No. 12 on the Billboard Hot 100 singles chart and No. 1 on the Billboard Easy Listening chart.
- "Together Let's Find Love" b/w "I Just Wanta Be Your Friend" peaked at No. 37 on the Billboard Hot 100, and No. 8 on the Billboard Easy Listening chart.

== Track listing ==
Side A

1. Love Medley (4:20)
  - "What the World Needs Now Is Love" (Burt Bacharach, Hal David)
  - "All You Need Is Love" (John Lennon, Paul McCartney)
  - "Have You Tried Love?" (Jimmy Webb)
2. "I Just Wanta Be Your Friend" (Willie Hutchison) – 3:18
3. Florence's Greeting – 0:11
4. Laura Nyro Medley (7:40)
  - "Stoney End"
  - "Stoned Soul Picnic"
  - "Sweet Blindness"
  - "Wedding Bell Blues"
  - "Save the Country"

Side B

1. "Never My Love" – 3:55
2. "Eli's Comin'" – 5:21
3. "Together Let's Find Love" – 3:31
4. "Shake Your Tambourine" – 3:40

Side C

1. Jimmy Webb Medley (6:43)
  - "Up, Up and Away"
  - "Paper Cup"
  - "This Is Your Life"
  - "The Girls' Song"
  - "The Worst That Could Happen"
  - "MacArthur Park"

Side D

1. "Ode to Billy Joe" – 7:45
2. "Lamonte's Group Introductions" – 2:15
3. "Lamonte's Intro" – 0:21
4. "I Want to Take You Higher" – 6:31
5. "Aquarius / Let the Sunshine In (The Flesh Failures)" – 7:57
6. "Use Your Head" (Young) – 3:45 [CD bonus track]
7. "Monday, Monday" (John Phillips) – 2:40 [CD bonus track]
8. "Goin' Out of My Head" (Robert Weinstein, Theodore Alexander Randazzo) – 3:47 [CD bonus track]

== Personnel ==
=== The 5th Dimension ===
- Marilyn McCoo – lead vocals (A4d, B1, C1d, C2), background vocals
- Florence LaRue – lead vocals (tracks A4a, C1c), background vocals
- Billy Davis Jr. – lead vocals (tracks A2, C1e, D2), background vocals
- Ron Townson – lead vocals (track C1f), background vocals
- Lamonte McLemore – background vocals

(Billy Davis Jr. and Marilyn McCoo sing duet on track B3)

=== Instrumentalists ===
- Hal Blaine – drums
- Joe Osborn, Andrew "Muff" White – bass guitar
- Larry Knechtel – organ, electric piano, electric guitar (track C2)
- Isaiah Jones – piano
- Rudy Stevenson – guitar, harmonica (track C2)
- Montego Joe – congas
- Bob Alcivar – conductor
- The Nat Brandwynne Orchestra – strings

=== Production ===
- Producer – Bones Howe
- Producer [Coordination] – Pam Vale
- Engineer – Bones Howe
- Assistant engineers – Ed Barton, John Golden, Ray Thompson

Instrumentalist and production credits originally appeared as part of the album gatefold liner notes.

== Charts ==
=== Album ===
Chart peaks for The 5th Dimension / Live!!
Chart (1971)	Peak position
CAN RPM Top 100 Albums	26
US Billboard Top LP's	32
US Billboard Best-Selling Soul LP's	13
US Cashbox Top 100 Albums	33

=== Singles ===
Year	Song	Chart	Peak position
1971	"Never My Love"	Billboard Hot 100	12
1971	"Together Let's Find Love"	Billboard Hot 100	37

== Certifications ==
Region	Certification	Certified units/sales
United States (RIAA)	Gold	500,000^{^}
^{^} Shipments figures based on certification alone.

== Ratings ==
Lindsay Planer from AllMusic rated the album 4 out of 5 stars, saying the album was an "adequate sampling" of the songs performed. She also calls it a "dark tale [that] is unraveled before the listener's ears."
