= Celebration – The Anniversary Album =

Compilation album by Johnny Mathis
- Released: 1981
- Recorded: 1956–1959; 1973–1980
- Genre: Traditional pop; R&B
- Length: 1:10:00
- Label: Columbia

Johnny Mathis chronology
The First 25 Years – The Silver Anniversary Album (1981)	Celebration – The Anniversary Album (1981)	Friends in Love (1982)

Celebration – The Anniversary Album is a compilation album by American pop singer Johnny Mathis that was released in the UK in 1981 (upon the 25th anniversary of his first recording) by the CBS Records division of Columbia. Two of the covers on this release had not previously been included on any Mathis album: Stevie Wonder's "If It's Magic" and a new version of Mathis's 1976 song "When a Child Is Born" that was recorded with Gladys Knight & the Pips and reached number 74 on the UK singles chart during a two-week run that began on December 26, 1981.

This album entered the UK album chart on September 19, 1981, and reached number nine over the course of 16 weeks, and nine days later, on September 28, the British Phonographic Industry awarded the album with Silver certification for sales of 60,000 units in the UK. It was released on compact disc in 1990.

Before the music begins for the second track on side one, Mathis provides some narration: "I've been privileged through my life to have had so many wonderful songs to sing. I'm often asked which are the most special and memorable for me. On looking back over my career right up until now, I've been thinking about the songs that have been, well, in a sense, landmarks for me across the years, and it all began with this..." -- "Wonderful! Wonderful!" being the song that he's referring to. He also comments on the occasion of this collection at the beginning of the last track on side two, "If It's Magic".

== Track listing ==
=== Side one ===
1. "You Saved My Life" performed with Stephanie Lawrence (Chris Arnold, Geoff Morrow) – 2:50
  - Jack Gold – producer
  - Gene Page – arranger, conductor
2. "Wonderful! Wonderful!" (Sherman Edwards, Ben Raleigh) – 3:05
  - Al Ham, Mitch Miller – producers
  - Ray Conniff – arranger, conductor
3. "It's Not for Me to Say" (Robert Allen, Al Stillman) – 3:05
  - Al Ham, Mitch Miller – producers
  - Ray Conniff – arranger, conductor
4. "Chances Are" (Robert Allen, Al Stillman) – 3:03
  - Mitch Miller – producer
  - Ray Conniff – arranger, conductor
5. "When a Child Is Born" performed with Gladys Knight & the Pips (Ciro Dammicco, Fred Jay) – 3:52
  - Jack Gold – producer
  - Gene Page – arranger, conductor
6. "Too Much, Too Little, Too Late" performed with Deniece Williams (Nat Kipner, John Vallins) – 2:59
  - Jack Gold – producer
  - Gene Page – arranger, conductor
7. "The Last Time I Felt Like This" performed with Jane Olivor (Alan Bergman, Marilyn Bergman, Marvin Hamlisch) – 2:57
  - Jack Gold – producer
  - Gene Page – arranger, conductor
8. "Stop Look and Listen to Your Heart" (Thom Bell, Linda Creed) – 4:18
  - Thom Bell – producer, arranger, conductor
9. "With You I'm Born Again" (Carol Connors, David Shire) – 4:03
  - Jack Gold – producer
  - Gene Page – arranger, conductor
10. "Three Times a Lady" (Lionel Richie) – 4:13
  - Jack Gold – producer
  - Gene Page – arranger, conductor

=== Side two ===
1. "She Believes in Me" (Steve Gibb) – 4:22
  - Jack Gold – producer
  - Gene Page – arranger, conductor
2. "I Will Survive" (Dino Fekaris, Freddie Perren) – 3:59
  - Jack Gold – producer
  - Victor Vanacore – arranger, conductor
3. "Evergreen (Love Theme from A Star Is Born)" (Barbra Streisand, Paul Williams) – 3:15
  - Jack Gold – producer
  - Gene Page – arranger, conductor
4. "When I Need You" (Albert Hammond, Carole Bayer Sager) – 3:26
  - Jack Gold – producer
  - Gene Page – arranger, conductor
5. "Sweet Surrender" (David Gates) – 2:35
  - Jerry Fuller – producer
  - D'Arneill Pershing – arranger, conductor
6. "How Deep Is Your Love" (Barry Gibb, Maurice Gibb, Robin Gibb) – 3:42
  - Jack Gold – producer
  - Glen Spreen – arranger, conductor
7. "We're All Alone" (Boz Scaggs) – 3:22
  - Jack Gold – producer
  - Gene Page – arranger, conductor
8. "Misty" (Johnny Burke, Erroll Garner) – 3:34
  - Al Ham, Mitch Miller – producers
  - Glenn Osser – arranger, conductor
9. "I'd Rather Be Here with You" (Thom Bell, Linda Creed) – 3:47
  - Thom Bell – producer, arranger, conductor
10. "If It's Magic" (Stevie Wonder) – 3:48
  - Jack Gold – producer

== Personnel ==
- Johnny Mathis – vocals
- Rosław Szaybo – design and art direction
- David Vance – photographer
