= Hot City (Gene Page album) =

Studio album by Gene Page
- Released: 1974
- Recorded: 1974
- Studio: Whitney Studios (Glendale, California)
- Genre: Soul; disco
- Length: 36:57
- Label: Atlantic
- Producer: Barry White

Gene Page chronology
Hot City (1974)	Lovelock! (1976)

Professional ratings
Review scores
Source	Rating
AllMusic	2/5 stars

Hot City is the debut album by Gene Page, released in 1974. It was produced by Barry White. The album peaked at number 156 on the US Billboard Top LPs & Tape chart.

== Track listing ==
1. "All Our Dreams Are Coming True" (Gene Page) – 4:00
2. "Jungle Eyes" (Billy Page, Gene Page) – 4:50
3. "She's My Main Squeeze" (Billy Page, Gene Page) – 3:58
4. "Gene's Theme" (Barry White) – 3:28
5. "I Am Living in a World of Gloom" (Barry White, Carnell Harrell, Elbert Denny) – 3:33
6. "Don't Play That Song" (Barry White) – 4:25
7. "Satin Soul" (Barry White) – 4:23
8. "Cream Corner (Get What You Want)" (Barry White, Gene Page) – 3:44
9. "To the Bone" (Barry White, Gene Page) – 4:36

== Personnel ==
- Gene Page – keyboards, arranger, conductor
- Wilton Felder – bass
- Ed Greene – drums
- Barry White, Clarence McDonald – keyboards
- David T. Walker, Dean Parks, Melvin "Wah-Wah Watson" Ragin, Ray Parker Jr. – guitars
- Ernie Watts – flute, soloist, saxophone, soloist
- Joe Clayton – congas
- Gary Coleman – congas

== Charts ==
Chart performance for Hot City
Chart (1974)	Peak position
US Billboard Top LPs & Tape	156
US Billboard Soul LPs	41
