= Isaiah Jones Jr. =

American minister and musician

- Born: 1940
- Died: September 21, 2008 (aged 67–68); Los Angeles
- Occupations: Christian minister, musician

Isaiah Jones Jr. (1940–2008) was an American musician and Presbyterian minister.

== Music ==
Jones authored more than 100 hymns. His works have appeared in Presbyterian, United Methodist, Lutheran, Episcopal, Baptist, and Catholic hymnals. "Fill My Cup" (1969) has been recorded by over 15 groups. "God Has Smiled on Me" was featured in the 1988 movie Clara's Heart. In 1973, the Gospel Music Academy named him "best songwriter of the year". He performed on Robert Shuller's television show Hour of Power and with the Billy Graham Crusade, and in 2001 on the nationally syndicated radio broadcast The Protestant Hour. In 2001, he recorded the album Everlasting God Be Blessed.

== Academia ==
Jones earned his BA from California State University, Los Angeles in 1972, his M.Div. from Talbot Theological Seminary in 1977, and his D.Min. from San Francisco Theological Seminary in 1989. He served as an adjunct faculty member for four universities.

== Ministries ==
Jones served as associate minister for Christian education at First Presbyterian Church in Los Angeles from 1979 to 1987. During the last two years there, he served as associate pastor at St. Paul's Presbyterian Church, also in Los Angeles. Later, he served as pastor of Community Presbyterian Church in Los Angeles. From 1995 to 1999, he served as campus minister for Oregon State University in Corvallis, Oregon. From 1999 until his retirement in 2007, he served at Covenant Presbyterian Church in Palo Alto, California

== Death ==
In 2007, Jones was diagnosed with leukemia. After a period of remission, he died on September 21, 2008, from pneumonia.

== Awards ==
- "Best songwriter of the year", Gospel Music Academy, 1973
- Grammy award, "Abundant Life", on Changing Times by Mighty Clouds of Joy, 1979.

== Publications ==
- Jones, Isaiah (2005). God Has Smiled on Me: An Isaiah Jones Songbook. Westminster John Knox Press. p. 112. ISBN 0-664-22879-8.
- Everlasting God Be Blessed (CD), 2001, Validus, ASIN: B000CA9Q6C
