= I'm Coming Home (album) =

Studio album by Johnny Mathis
- Released: September 21, 1973
- Recorded: May 23–25, 1973
- Studio: Sigma Sound, Philadelphia, Pennsylvania
- Genre: Vocal pop; pop rock
- Length: 41:06
- Label: Columbia
- Producer: Thom Bell

Johnny Mathis chronology
Killing Me Softly with Her Song (1973)	I'm Coming Home (1973)	Johnny Mathis Sings the Great Songs (1974)

Singles from I'm Coming Home
- 1. "I'm Coming Home" Released: July 27, 1973; 2. "Life Is a Song Worth Singing" Released: November 21, 1973; 3. "Sweet Child" Released: April 29, 1974; 4. "I'm Stone in Love with You" Released: April 1975

I'm Coming Home is an album by American pop singer Johnny Mathis that was released on September 21, 1973, by Columbia Records and was mainly composed of material written by the songwriting team of its producer, Thom Bell, and Linda Creed. Unlike several of the Mathis albums before it, I'm Coming Home relied primarily on new songs and included only two covers of established chart hits, both of which were by The Stylistics ("I'm Stone in Love with You" and "Stop Look and Listen to Your Heart").

The album made its first appearance on Billboard magazine's Top LP's & Tapes chart in the issue dated November 17, 1973, and remained there for 22 weeks, peaking at number 115. it also debuted on the Cashbox albums chart in the issue dated November 10, 1973, and remained on the chart for 22 weeks, peaking at number 66. It also began an 11-week run on the UK album chart on March 8, 1975, during which time it made it to number 18. On July 1, 1975, the British Phonographic Industry awarded the album with Silver certification for sales of 60,000 units.

The title track was released as the first single from the album on July 27, 1973, and entered Billboard's list of the 50 most popular Easy Listening songs in the US the following month in the issue of the magazine dated August 25 to begin an 18-week stay that included a week at number one—Mathis's first week in the top spot on that particular chart. The song entered the Hot 100 in the September 22 issue, reaching number 75 over the course of 10 weeks, and gave him his first Soul chart entry in almost 10 years when it started a five-week run in the October 6 issue that took the song to number 92.

The second single released in the US, "Life Is a Song Worth Singing", made its first appearance on the Easy Listening chart in the issue dated December 22, 1973, and got as high as number eight during its 15 weeks there. The December 29 issue saw its debut on the Hot 100, which resulted in a 12-week stay and a peak position at number 54, and its eight-week Soul chart run began in the January 26 issue and took it to number 65.

A third song from the album, "Sweet Child", began a five-week run on the Easy Listening chart that spring in the June 1 issue and got to number 35.

The only song from the album to make the UK singles chart, "I'm Stone in Love with You", started its 12 weeks there on January 25, 1975, and made it to number 10. It also entered the Easy Listening chart in the US two months later, on March 29, and reached number 16 during its nine weeks there.

The album was released on compact disc on July 1, 2003. On March 10, 2015, Real Gone Music released Life Is a Song Worth Singing: The Complete Thom Bell Sessions, a two-disc set featuring remastered editions of I'm Coming Home and Mathis and Bell's other LP collaboration, Mathis Is..., along with bonus tracks on each disc. I'm Coming Home was also included in Legacy's Mathis box set The Voice of Romance: The Columbia Original Album Collection, which was released on December 8, 2017.

== History ==
Upon the album's CD release in 2003, writer Ellis Widner noted that the original release came at a point at which "Mathis knew it was time to refresh his music and renew his career. It had been four years since his last hit" on the Billboard Hot 100 (1969's number 96 entry, "Love Theme from Romeo and Juliet (A Time for Us)"). Bell was fresh off of a series of hits with The Delfonics, The Stylistics, and The Spinners. "Following several smashes on both the pop and R&B charts, Bell was ready to approach what he calls 'the sterling of sterling: Mathis. I kept hearing Mathis in my mind. You work hard reaching that pinnacle to work with him. And that’s what I did. I worked as hard as I could. After I started with the Spinners is when I told my manager, "I’d like to grab Mathis."'"

Before writing the songs for the album, Bell and Creed did extensive interviews with Mathis to get his "'thoughts about different things.'" "'They're like internal musings,'" said Mathis about the material that resulted. Bell recalls how moved the singer was by what they presented for him to record and how he explained, "'That's the reason we sat with you—to see what kind of person you are, to see what makes you tick.'"

Bell also chose to present Mathis's voice in a different way. "'Everyone who recorded him had recorded his voice high,' he says. 'I took him from way in the air and brought him down. He has a much more mature, rich sound singing a little lower. He was so relieved. He couldn't believe I was taking him down.'"

== Reception ==
Professional ratings
Review scores
Source	Rating
Allmusic	3/5 stars
Billboard	positive
The Encyclopedia of Popular Music	3/5 stars

Billboard recommended the album. "When Mathis is provided with the proper material for his voice, sparks fly, and that's the case here." They enjoyed several of the selections, including "I'm Stone in Love with You", "which he does majestically. His recent single-LP title tune is superb listening, as are 'And I Think That's What I'll Do', 'Life Is a Song Worth Singing' (a production masterpiece), and 'A Baby's Born'. Mathis sings with an inspired feeling, turning 'Stop Look and Listen to Your Heart' into a delightful thought for repeating."

AllMusic's Craig Lytle wrote retrospectively: "Most of these numbers have that Stylistics, Spinners, and even Temptations aura, and are good listening songs."

== Track listing ==
All songs written by Thom Bell and Linda Creed except as noted:

=== Side one ===
1. "I'm Coming Home" – 3:24
2. "I'd Rather Be Here with You" – 3:47
3. "Foolish" (T. Bell, Creed, Bruce Hawes, Joseph B. Jefferson) – 4:38
4. "I'm Stone in Love with You" (Anthony Bell, T. Bell, Creed) – 3:30
5. "And I Think That's What I'll Do" – 3:41

=== Side two ===
1. "Life Is a Song Worth Singing" – 6:06
2. "A Baby's Born" – 4:28
3. "Sweet Child" – 4:02
4. "Stop Look and Listen to Your Heart" – 4:18
5. "I Just Wanted to Be Me" (Bruce Hawes, Joseph B. Jefferson) – 3:12

=== Real Gone Music CD Bonus Tracks ===
Disc one (I'm Coming Home) bonus tracks

1. "I'm Coming Home" (Stereo Single Version) – 3:24
2. "I'm Stone in Love with You" (Unreleased Instrumental Version) – 3:30
3. "And I Think That's What I'll Do" (Unreleased Instrumental Version) – 4:36
4. "Life Is a Song Worth Singing" (Mono Single Edit - Short Version) – 3:20

Disc two (Mathis Is...) bonus tracks

1. "Betcha by Golly, Wow" – 2:49
  - recorded in 1972 for his album The First Time Ever (I Saw Your Face)
2. "Break Up to Make Up" (T. Bell, Creed, Kenneth Gamble) – 3:50
  - rec. in 1973 for his album Killing Me Softly with Her Song
3. "You're As Right As Rain" – 3:02
  - rec. in 1975 for his album When Will I See You Again
4. "You Brought Me Love" performed with Patti Austin (Andy Goldmark) – 4:07
  - rec. in 1991 for his album Better Together: The Duet Album
5. "You Make Me Feel Brand New" performed with Yolanda Adams – 5:12
  - rec. in 2008 for his album A Night to Remember
6. "Loving You-Losing You" (Mono Single Version) (LeRoy Bell, T. Bell) – 3:46
  - rec. in 1977 for his album Mathis Is...

== Recording dates ==
From the liner notes for The Voice of Romance: The Columbia Original Album Collection:

- May 23, 1973 – "A Baby's Born", "Foolish", "I'd Rather Be Here with You", "Sweet Child"
- May 24, 1973 – "And I Think That's What I'll Do", "I'm Coming Home", "I'm Stone in Love with You", "Life Is a Song Worth Singing"
- May 25, 1973 – "I Just Wanted to Be Me", "Stop Look and Listen to Your Heart"

== Personnel ==
=== Original album ===
- Johnny Mathis - vocals
- Thom Bell - producer, arranger, conductor
- Mike Hutchinson - engineer
- Don Murray - engineer
- Ken Robertson - engineer
- Joe Tarsia - engineer
- Robert Blakeman - photography

=== Real Gone Music reissue ===
- Gordon Anderson – producer
- Joe Marchese - liner notes; compiler, producer
- Jeff James - Sony producer; compiling assistant
- Johnny Mathis - compiling assistant
- Tom D. Kline - design
- Michael Ochs Archives – photo
- Getty Images - photo
- Remastered by Sean Brennan at Battery Studios, New York City

== Bibliography ==
- Whitburn, Joel (2004), Joel Whitburn Presents Top R&B/Hip-Hop Singles, 1942-2004, Record Research Inc., ISBN 0-89820-160-8
- Whitburn, Joel (2007), Joel Whitburn Presents Billboard Top Adult Songs, 1961-2006, Record Research Inc., ISBN 978-0898201697
- Whitburn, Joel (2009), Joel Whitburn's Top Pop Singles, 1955-2008, Record Research Inc., ISBN 978-0-89820-180-2
- Whitburn, Joel (2010), Joel Whitburn Presents Top Pop Albums, Seventh Edition, Record Research Inc., ISBN 978-0-89820-183-3
- Hoffmann, Frank K (1988), The Cash box album charts, 1955-1974, Scarecrow Press, ISBN 0-8108-2005-6
