= That's What Friends Are For (Johnny Mathis and Deniece Williams album) =

Studio album by Johnny Mathis and Deniece Williams
- Released: July 1978
- Recorded: April 20 – May 12, 1978
- Studios: A&M, Hollywood
- Genres: R&B; soul
- Length: 32:30
- Label: Columbia/Legacy
- Producers: David Foster, Jack Gold

Johnny Mathis chronology
You Light Up My Life (1978)	That's What Friends Are For (1978)	The Best Days of My Life (1979)

Deniece Williams chronology
Song Bird (1977)	That's What Friends Are For (1978)	When Love Comes Calling (1979)

That's What Friends Are For is an album by American singers Johnny Mathis and Deniece Williams, released in July 1978 on Columbia Records. The album peaked at No. 19 on the Billboard Top LPs & Tape chart and No. 14 on the Billboard Soul LPs chart in the United States, and No. 16 on the UK Albums chart. That's What Friends Are For has been certified Gold in the US by the RIAA and Gold in the UK by the BPI.

== Overview ==
The album was first released on CD in 1997 and reissued on July 1, 2003, with four additional songs by the duo, including a previously unreleased version of "Without Us", the theme from the television series Family Ties.

== Singles ==
Following quickly on the heels of the June 3, 1978, issue of Billboard in which "Too Much, Too Little, Too Late" enjoyed its week at number one on the magazine's Hot 100, this album's opener, a cover of Marvin Gaye and Tammi Terrell's "You're All I Need To Get By", was released on June 15 and had a July 8 debut on the magazine's list of the 100 most popular R&B singles in the US, where it peaked at number 10 over the course of 12 weeks. The July 8 issue also marked its first appearance on the magazine's list of the 50 most popular Easy Listening records in the US, where it spent 11 weeks and got as high as number 16. The July 29 issue included the debut of the song on the Hot 100, where it stayed for eight weeks and reached number 47. The duet also became a new entry on the July 29 UK singles chart, where it made it to number 45 during a six-week run.

The title song from the album (not to be confused with the Bacharach/Sager composition later popularized by Dionne Warwick) was released as a single in the fall of 1978 but did not have any chart appearances.

== Critical reception ==
Professional ratings
Review scores
Source	Rating
AllMusic	3/5 stars
The Encyclopedia of Popular Music	3/5 stars
Record Mirror	3/5 stars
The Rolling Stone Record Guide	4/5 stars

Billboard remarked, "For the most part this is a set of slick, pretty R&B pop duets, marked by Mathis' best, most uninhibited singing to date, and the equally important participation of Williams."

Paul Sexton of Record Mirror commented that "their coupling is quite satisfactory from an artistic point of view." Dennis Hunt of the Los Angeles Times said that "Mathis' duets with Williams have rescued him from the MOR graveyard and given him new life in the pop/R&B market. This album, far superior to the last featuring this pair, brims with romantic material. To make sure no one mistakes these songs for MOR, producer Jack Gold has tacked on sprightly rhythm tracks which turn some of them into gentle rockers."

Ron Wynn of AllMusic stated: "Johnny Mathis and Deniece Williams made a fine team on this collection of sentimental love songs and light pop ballads."

== Track listing ==
=== Side one ===
1. "You're All I Need to Get By" (Nickolas Ashford, Valerie Simpson) – 2:40
2. "Until You Come Back to Me (That's What I'm Gonna Do)" (Morris Broadnax, Clarence Paul, Stevie Wonder) – 3:39
3. "You're a Special Part of My Life" (Lani Groves, Clarence McDonald, Deniece Williams) – 2:56
4. "Ready or Not" (Amber DiLena, Jack Keller) – 2:50
5. "Me for You, You for Me" (Fritz Baskett, Clarence McDonald) – 3:12

=== Side two ===
1. "Your Precious Love"^{[A]} (Nickolas Ashford, Valerie Simpson) – 3:22
2. "Just the Way You Are" (Billy Joel) – 3:43
3. "That's What Friends Are For" (Fritz Baskett, Lani Groves, Clarence McDonald, Deniece Williams) – 3:27
4. "I Just Can't Get Over You" (Nat Kipner, Winston Sela) – 4:11
5. "Touching Me With Love" (Marilyn Berglas, Charlee Maass) – 2:30
- ^{A} The title of this track was replaced on other LP pressings from 1978 and subsequent CD releases with:
  - "Heaven Must Have Sent You". It is however the same song.

=== 2003 CD bonus tracks ===
This album's 2003 CD release included four bonus duets:

- "Emotion" (Barry Gibb, Robin Gibb) – 3:18
- "Too Much, Too Little, Too Late" (Nat Kipner, John Vallins) – 3:00
- "Love Won't Let Me Wait" (Vinnie Barrett, Bobby Eli) – 4:16
- "Without Us" from Family Ties (Jeff Barry, Tom Scott) – 4:02

As with "Too Much, Too Little, Too Late", "Emotion" was also recorded for the You Light Up My Life album. "Love Won't Let Me Wait" was recorded in 1983 for Mathis's 1984 album A Special Part of Me.

=== 2017 CD bonus tracks ===
This album's CD release as part of the 2017 box set The Voice of Romance: The Columbia Original Album Collection included three bonus tracks:

- "Comme ci, comme ça" (J. S. Stewart) – 2:58
- "Without Us" from Family Ties (Barry, Scott) – 4:02
- "So Deep in Love" (Barry, Bruce Roberts) – 4:32

"Comme ci, comme ça" and "So Deep in Love" had not been available before. The former was recorded during the sessions for this album, the latter at the same session as the theme song for the series.

== Recording dates ==
From the liner notes for the 2003 CD release:

- April 20, 1978 – "You're a Special Part of My Life", "Ready or Not", "Me for You, You for Me", "I Just Can't Get Over You"
- April 26, 1978 – "That's What Friends Are For"
- April 28, 1978 – "Heaven Must Have Sent You"
- May 5, 1978 – "You're All I Need to Get By", "Just the Way You Are", "Touching Me with Love"
- May 12, 1978 – "Until You Come Back to Me (That's What I'm Gonna Do)"

=== Bonus tracks ===
From the liner notes for The Voice of Romance: The Columbia Original Album Collection:

- December 20, 1977 – "Emotion"
- December 21, 1977 – "Too Much, Too Little, Too Late"
- April 26, 1978 – "Comme ci, comme ça"
- October 21, 1982 – "So Deep in Love", "Without Us"
- August 16, 1983 – "Love Won't Let Me Wait"

== Personnel ==
=== Original album ===
From the liner notes for the original album:

=== Musicians ===
- Murray Adler – violin
- Dorothy Ashby – harp
- Michael Baird – drums
- Israel Baker – violin
- Arnold Belnick – violin
- Harry Bluestone – concertmaster
- Ronald Cooper – cello
- Paulinho da Costa – percussion
- Rollice Dale – viola
- Douglas Davis – cello
- Vincent DeRosa – French horn
- Glen Dicterow – violin
- Kurt Dieterle – violin
- Assa Drori – violin
- David Allan Duke – French horn
- Scott Edwards – bass
- Jesse Ehrlich – cello
- Alan Estes – percussion
- Henry Ferber – violin
- Ronald Folsom – violin
- David Frisina – violin
- Jim Gilstrap – backing vocals (6, 9)
- Endre Granat – violin
- Bill Green – flute, baritone saxophone
- Ed Greene – drums
- Lani Groves – backing vocals (6, 9)
- Allan Harshman – viola
- John Heitmann – flute
- Robert Henderson – French horn
- William Hymanson – violin
- Plas Johnson – flute, flute solo ("I Just Can't Get Over You")
- Armand Kaproff – cello
- Dennis Karmazyn – cello
- Ray Kelley – cello
- Myra Kestenbaum – viola
- Jacob Krachmalnick – violin
- Raphael Kramer – cello
- Ron Leonard – cello
- Steve Lukather – guitar
- Arthur Maebe – French horn
- Virginia Majewski – viola
- Leonard Malarsky – violin
- Johnny Mathis – lead and backing vocals
- Tim May – guitar
- Alexander Neiman – viola
- Gareth "Garry" Nuttycombe – viola
- Don Palmer – violin
- Richard Perissi – French horn
- Greg Phillinganes – keyboards
- Stanley Plummer – violin
- George Price – French horn
- Lee Ritenour – guitar
- Sylvester Rivers – keyboards
- Nathan Ross – violin
- Henry Roth – violin
- Michel Rubini – piano
- Sheldon Sanov – violin
- Harry Schultz – cello
- David Schwartz – viola
- Gene Sherry – French horn
- Jack Shulman – violin
- Henry Sigismonti – French horn
- Ralph Silverman – violin
- Leland Sklar – bass
- Marshall Sosson – violin
- Sheridon Stokes – flute
- Gloria Strassner – cello
- Alexander Treger – violin
- Tommy Vig – percussion
- David T. Walker – guitar
- Wah Wah Ragin – guitar
- Ernie Watts – tenor saxophone
- Maxine Willard Waters – backing vocals (6, 9)
- Deniece Williams – lead and backing vocals
- Stevie Wonder – harmonica solo ("Just the Way You Are")
- Robert Zimmitti – percussion

=== Production ===
- Jack Gold – producer
- Gene Page – arranger, conductor (except where noted)
- Glen Spreen – arranger, conductor ("That's What Friends Are For")
- Dick Bogert – recording engineer
- Joe Gastwirt – digital remastering
- Tom Perry – mix engineer at Hollywood Sound Recorders (Hollywood, CA); mastering engineer at The Mastering Lab (Los Angeles, CA).
- Sam Emerson – photography

=== 2003 CD reissue ===
From the liner notes for the 2003 CD release:

Bonus tracks

- Jack Gold – producer (except where noted)
- Denny Diante – producer ("Love Won't Let Me Wait")
- Gene Page – arranger, conductor (except where noted)
- Michel Colombier – arranger; conductor ("Love Won't Let Me Wait")

Reissue credits

- Didier C. Deutsch – producer
- Joseph M. Palmaccio – mastering engineer
- Steve Berkowitz – Legacy A&R
- Joy Gilbert Monfried – product manager
- Darren Salmieri – A&R coordination
- Howard Fritzson – art direction
- Risa Noah – design
- Sam Emerson – photography
- Art Maillet/Sony Music Archives – photography
- Linda Chang – packaging manager
- Stacey Boyle – tape research
- Matt Kelly – tape research
- Ellis Widner – liner notes
- Mastered at Sony Music Studios, New York

== Charts ==
=== Album ===
Chart (1978)	Peak position
Canada Top Albums/CDs (RPM)	30
Dutch Albums (Album Top 100)	23
UK Albums (Official Charts)	16
US Billboard 200	19
US Top R&B/Hip-Hop Albums (Billboard)	14

=== Singles ===
Year	Single	Chart	Position	Country
1978	"You're All I Need to Get By"	Hot 100	47	US
1978	"You're All I Need to Get By"	Soul Singles	10	US
1978	"You're All I Need to Get By"	UK Singles	45	UK

== Bibliography ==
- Whitburn, Joel (2000), Joel Whitburn's Top R&B Albums, 1965-1998, Record Research Inc., ISBN 0898201349
- Whitburn, Joel (2004), Joel Whitburn Presents Top R&B/Hip-Hop Singles, 1942-2004, Record Research Inc., ISBN 0898201608
- Whitburn, Joel (2007), Joel Whitburn Presents Billboard Top Adult Songs, 1961-2006, Record Research Inc., ISBN 978-0898201697
- Whitburn, Joel (2009), Joel Whitburn's Top Pop Singles, 1955-2008, Record Research Inc., ISBN 978-0898201802
- Whitburn, Joel (2010), Joel Whitburn Presents Top Pop Albums, Seventh Edition, Record Research Inc., ISBN 978-0-89820-183-3
