= Close Encounters (Gene Page album) =

Studio album by Gene Page
- Released: 1978
- Recorded: 1978
- Genre: Soul/disco
- Length: 38:16
- Label: Arista
- Producer: Billy Page, Gene Page

Gene Page chronology
Lovelock! (1976)	Close Encounters (1978)	Love Starts After Dark (1980)

Professional ratings
Review scores
Source	Rating
Allmusic	2/5 stars

Close Encounters is the third album by Gene Page. It was produced by Billy Page and Gene Page.

== Track listing ==
1. "Close Encounters of the Third Kind" (John Williams) 4:18
2. "Theme From Star Trek" (Alexander Courage) 3:22
3. "C E 3 K" (John Williams) 0:14
4. "Moonglow and Love Theme" (Eddie DeLange, Irving Mills, Will Hudson, George Duning) 5:04
5. "Dancin' in the Sky" (Gene Page) 4:50
6. "I Feel Like I've Been Livin' (On The Dark Side of the Moon)" (Ronald Baker) 4:45
7. "Beyond The Hole in Space" (Gene Page) 3:28
8. "When You Wish upon a Star" (Leigh Harline, Ned Washington) 3:47
9. "Sho' Like To Ride On Your Star" (Gene Page, Lamont Dozier) 3:43
10. "Saturn" (Michael Sembello, Stevie Wonder) 4:45

== Personnel ==
- Gene Page - keyboards
- Sylvester Rivers - keyboards
- Eddie Greene - drums
- David T. Walker, Wah Wah Watson, Tim May - guitar
- Wilton Felder, Scott Edwards - bass
- Greg Phillinganes, Michael Boddicker - synthesizer
- Gary Coleman, Jack Ashford, Paulinho da Costa - percussion
- Harry Bluestone - concertmaster
- Ernie Watts - saxophone on "Moonglow and Love Theme"
- Jim Gilstrap, John Lehman, Zebara Turnbugh - vocals
- Michael Phillips - voice on "Close Encounters of the Third Kind"

Technical

- Norman Seeff - photography
