= You Light Up My Life (Johnny Mathis album) =

Studio album by Johnny Mathis
- Released: March 13, 1978
- Recorded: December 19–21, 1977
- Studios: A&M, Hollywood
- Genre: Vocal
- Length: 34:04
- Label: Columbia
- Producer: Jack Gold

Johnny Mathis chronology
Hold Me, Thrill Me, Kiss Me (1977)	You Light Up My Life (1978)	That's What Friends Are For (1978)

Singles from You Light Up My Life
- 1. "Too Much, Too Little, Too Late" Released: February 21, 1978

You Light Up My Life is an album by American pop singer Johnny Mathis, released on March 13, 1978, by Columbia Records. While this LP includes three new songs ("All I Ever Need", "I Wrote a Symphony on My Guitar", and the hit pairing with Deniece Williams, "Too Much, Too Little, Too Late"), it doesn't stray too far from the format of his albums of recent years in covering established material, including a standard ("Where or When"), a country number ("It Was Almost Like a Song"), something from Broadway ("If You Believe"), and a few soundtrack tunes (the title track, "How Deep Is Your Love", "Till Love Touches Your Life").

The album debuted on Billboard magazine's Top LP's & Tapes chart in the issue dated April 1, 1978, and remained there for 24 weeks, peaking at number 9 while in the meantime receiving Gold certification from the Recording Industry Association of America on May 2 and Platinum certification two months later, on July 6. It also made it to number 3 during a 19-week run on the UK album chart, and on June 30 of that year the British Phonographic Industry awarded the album with Gold certification for sales of over 100,000 units in the UK.

The single from the album, "Too Much, Too Little, Too Late", had its chart debut on Billboard magazine's list of the 100 most popular R&B singles in the US in the issue dated March 4, 1978, where it lasted for 20 weeks, four of which were spent at number one. The following issue, dated March 11, marked its first appearance on the magazine's list of the 50 most popular Easy Listening records in the US, where it enjoyed one week out of the 19 it spent there in the top spot. On March 25 it became a new entry on the UK singles chart, where it got as high as number three over the course of 14 weeks. Billboard's April 1 issue saw the debut of the song on the Hot 100, where it stayed for 18 weeks, one of which was at number one. Gold certification by the Recording Industry Association of America was awarded the following month, on May 2, for what was then the required sales of one million units in the US, and Silver certification by the British Phonographic Industry was issued for sales of over 250,000 units in the UK.

The album was first released on compact disc in 1988. A 3-CD box set that included this album along with the follow-up that Mathis recorded with Deniece Williams entitled That's What Friends Are For and the 1991 compilation Better Together: The Duet Album was released on August 12, 1997. You Light Up My Life was also released as one of two albums on one CD by Funkytowngrooves on January 27, 2015, along with Mathis 1979 Album, Mathis Magic.

== Reception ==
Professional ratings
Review scores
Source	Rating
AllMusic	2.5/5 stars
The Encyclopedia of Popular Music	4/5 stars

When the album came out, Billboard predicted, "This should be Mathis's biggest release in years," and that his "vocals are characteristically effortless as he glides over the big orchestral arrangements by Gene Page." They also like the variety of genres covered. "The diversity of the material challenges him as a singer to make this one of his most well-balanced and fully satisfying albums."

Record World notes "The Mathis formula sounds as redoubtable as ever with his smooth interpretations of chart hits like the title song, "Emotion" and "How Deep Is Your Love."

== Track listing ==
=== Side one ===
1. "You Light Up My Life" from You Light Up My Life (Joe Brooks) – 3:55
2. "Emotion" performed with Deniece Williams (Barry Gibb, Robin Gibb) – 3:16
3. "All I Ever Need" (Jacques Sawyer) – 3:12
4. "Where or When" from Babes in Arms (Lorenz Hart, Richard Rodgers) – 2:35
5. "If You Believe" (a.k.a. "Believe in Yourself" (reprise)) from The Wiz (Charlie Smalls) – 3:31

=== Side two ===
1. "Too Much, Too Little, Too Late" performed with Deniece Williams (Nat Kipner, John Vallins) – 2:59
2. "How Deep Is Your Love" from Saturday Night Fever (Barry Gibb, Maurice Gibb, Robin Gibb) – 3:42
3. "Till Love Touches Your Life" from Madron (Arthur Hamilton, Riz Ortolani) – 4:00
4. "I Wrote a Symphony on My Guitar" (Arthur Hamilton, LeRoy Holmes) – 3:05
5. "It Was Almost Like a Song" (Hal David, Archie Jordan) – 3:49

== Recording dates ==
From the liner notes for The Voice of Romance: The Columbia Original Album Collection:

- December 19, 1977 – "How Deep Is Your Love", "If You Believe", "It Was Almost Like a Song"
- December 20, 1977 – "Emotion", "I Wrote a Symphony on My Guitar", "Till Love Touches Your Life", "You Light Up My Life"
- December 21, 1977 – "All I Ever Need", "Too Much, Too Little, Too Late", "Where or When"

== Personnel ==
From the liner notes for the original album:

- Johnny Mathis – vocals
- Deniece Williams – vocals ("Emotion", "Too Much, Too Little, Too Late")
- Jack Gold – producer
- Gene Page – arranger, conductor (except as noted)
- Glen Spreen – arranger, conductor ("How Deep Is Your Love", "If You Believe", "It Was Almost like a Song")
- Dick Bogert – recording engineer
- Ray Gerhardt – recording engineer
- Tom Perry – mix engineer
- Beverly Parker – photography, design
- Nancy Donald – design
- Mixed at Hollywood Sound

== Charts ==
=== Weekly charts ===
Chart (1978)	Peak position
Canada Top Albums/CDs (RPM)	5
New Zealand Albums (RMNZ)	33
UK Albums (Official Charts)	3
US Billboard 200	9
US Top R&B/Hip-Hop Albums (Billboard)	4

=== Year-end charts ===
Chart (1978)	Position
Canada Top Albums/CDs (RPM)	52
US Billboard 200	73
US Top R&B/Hip-Hop Albums (Billboard)	48

== Bibliography ==
- Whitburn, Joel (2004), Joel Whitburn Presents Top R&B/Hip-Hop Singles, 1942-2004, Record Research Inc., ISBN 0898201608
- Whitburn, Joel (2007), Joel Whitburn Presents Billboard Top Adult Songs, 1961-2006, Record Research Inc., ISBN 978-0898201697
- Whitburn, Joel (2009), Joel Whitburn's Top Pop Singles, 1955-2008, Record Research Inc., ISBN 978-0898201802
- Whitburn, Joel (2010), Joel Whitburn Presents Top Pop Albums, Seventh Edition, Record Research Inc., ISBN 978-0-89820-183-3
- Larkin, Colin (2007), The Encyclopedia of Popular Music, Omnibus Press, ISBN 9-7818-4609-8567
