= Killing Me Softly with Her Song (album) =

Studio album by Johnny Mathis
- Released: May 25, 1973
- Recorded: March 1, 1973; March 29, 1973; April 2, 1973; April 25–26, 1973
- Studio: Larrabee Sound, Los Angeles, California
- Genre: AM pop; early pop/rock; vocal pop
- Length: 39:49
- Label: Columbia
- Producer: Jerry Fuller

Johnny Mathis chronology
Me and Mrs. Jones (1973)	Killing Me Softly with Her Song (1973)	I'm Coming Home (1973)

Killing Me Softly with Her Song is an album by American pop singer Johnny Mathis that was released on May 25, 1973, by Columbia Records and leaned heavily on covers of the latest radio favorites.

The album made its first appearance on Billboard magazine's Top LP's & Tapes chart in the issue dated June 30, 1973, and remained there for seven weeks, peaking at number 120. it also debuted on the Cash Box albums chart in the issue dated July 7, 1973, and remained on the chart for six weeks, peaking at number 125.

One of the two original songs on the album, "Show and Tell", began a three-week run on Billboard's Easy Listening chart in that year's May 12 issue and peaked at number 36. The other, "Arianne", music and lyrics by Martin Charnin. reached number 24 on that same chart in 1977 during a nine-week stay that began in the July 23 issue.

== Reception ==
Professional ratings
Review scores
Source	Rating
Allmusic	3/5 stars
Billboard	positive
The Encyclopedia of Popular Music	3/5 stars

William Ruhlmann of AllMusic described the place of this album within the Easy Listening genre in his review. "The early 1970s was a tough time for established ballad singers, but Johnny Mathis, who was younger than his peers and Columbia Records labelmates like Tony Bennett and Andy Williams, weathered the lean times better than most. Some of the reasons why are suggested in this 1973 album. It wasn't a big seller by any means, but this enjoyable, contemporary-sounding set made the charts." He also points out that "unlike Bennett, who had [left] Columbia the year before, Mathis had no resistance to contemporary material; he sounded fine singing it. And though he had never had much of an impact in the R&B market, he was an African-American who could handle the Stylistics and Gladys Knight songs credibly, substituting his trademark tremulousness for their more soulful approach. At the same time, he could match both Perry Como and newer soft-rock stars like Bread and the Carpenters."

At the time of the album's release, Billboard also had good things to say. "If you believe in masterpieces, then this LP qualifies." Already aware of the plans for his subsequent album, I'm Coming Home, which focused on new material, the magazine prematurely declared this as the end of his cover album phase. "Although Mathis is now on a path to record original songs, this last in his series of covering tunes is a totally rewarding listening experience." (Mathis would continue to record albums that included a varying number of current hit songs by other artists until the late 1970s.) The magazine was quite impressed with this project. "Mathis may have been recording for 17 years, but this newest work is magical. His clean, sweetly flowing voice is married perfectly to so many fine and outstanding songs that one wonders why they weren't presented to him in the first place. He makes them all come alive." They also appreciated the arrangements here. "There is a fine, gossamer feeling to D'Arneill Pershing's charts which makes the music more than merely commercially romantic."

== Track listing ==
=== Side one ===
1. "Killing Me Softly with Her Song" (Charles Fox, Norman Gimbel) – 5:18
2. "Aubrey" (David Gates) – 3:37
3. "And I Love You So" (Don McLean) – 3:26
4. "Break Up to Make Up" (Thom Bell, Linda Creed, Kenneth Gamble) – 3:50
5. "Arianne" (Martin Charnin, Christian Roudey) – 3:29

=== Side two ===
1. "Neither One of Us (Wants to Be the First to Say Goodbye)" (Jim Weatherly) – 4:26
2. "Wildflower" (Doug Edwards, David Richardson) – 4:21
3. "You Are the Sunshine of My Life" (Stevie Wonder) – 2:41
4. "Sing" from Sesame Street (Joe Raposo) – 3:04
5. "Good Morning Heartache" (Ervin Drake, Dan Fisher, Irene Higginbotham) – 2:25
6. "Show and Tell" (Jerry Fuller) – 3:12

== Recording dates ==
From the liner notes for The Voice of Romance: The Columbia Original Album Collection:

- March 1, 1973 – "Killing Me Softly with Her Song", "Neither One of Us (Wants to Be the First to Say Goodbye)", "Show and Tell"
- March 29, 1973 – "Break Up to Make Up", "Sing"
- April 2, 1973 – "Aubrey", "Good Morning Heartache", "You Are the Sunshine of My Life"
- April 25, 1973 – "Arianne"
- April 25–26, 1973 – "And I Love You So", "Wildflower"

== Personnel ==
From the liner notes for the original album:

- Johnny Mathis - vocals
- Jerry Fuller - producer
- D'Arneill Pershing - arranger
- Barry Rudolph - recording engineer
- Richard Avedon - photographer
- Beverly Parker - design

== Bibliography ==
- Whitburn, Joel (2007), Joel Whitburn Presents Billboard Top Adult Songs, 1961-2006, Record Research Inc., ISBN 978-0898201697
- Whitburn, Joel (2010), Joel Whitburn Presents Top Pop Albums, Seventh Edition, Record Research Inc., ISBN 978-0-89820-183-3
- Hoffmann, Frank W (1988), The Cash box album charts, 1955-1974, Scarecrow Press, ISBN 0-810-82005-6
