= If I Could Reach You (song) =

- German release picture sleeve

Single by the 5th Dimension

from the album Individually & Collectively
- B-side: "Tomorrow Belongs to the Children"
- Released: August 1972
- Genre: Pop
- Length: 3:08
- Label: Bell
- Songwriter: Randall Clayton McNeill
- Producer: Bones Howe

The 5th Dimension singles chronology
"(Last Night) I Didn't Get to Sleep at All" (1972)	"If I Could Reach You" (1972)	"Living Together, Growing Together" (1972)

"If I Could Reach You" is a song written by Randall Clayton McNeill and recorded by The 5th Dimension in 1972.

== Chart performance ==
The song was the group's final top 10 on the Hot 100, peaking at number 10 there, and was the group's final number one on the Easy Listening chart, on 28 October 1972.

== See also ==
- List of number-one adult contemporary singles of 1972 (U.S.)
