= Life Is a Song Worth Singing (song) =

Single by Johnny Mathis

from the album I'm Coming Home
- B-side: "I Just Wanted to be Me"
- Released: 1973
- Genre: Easy listening
- Length: 4:30
- Label: Columbia Records
- Songwriter(s): Thom Bell and Linda Creed
- Producer(s): Thom Bell

Johnny Mathis singles chronology
""I'm Coming Home”" (1973)	"Life Is a Song Worth Singing" (1973)	"“Sweet Child”" (1974)

"Life Is a Song Worth Singing" is a song written by Thom Bell and Linda Creed. It was notably recorded by American Johnny Mathis on his 1973 album, I'm Coming Home, released by Columbia Records. The song was released as the second single from the album, peaking at No. 8 on the Billboard Adult Contemporary chart and No. 54 on the Billboard Hot 100.

The song has also been recorded by the Sandpipers (1976), and is the title track of Teddy Pendergrass' second studio album released in 1978.

== Chart performance ==
Chart (1974)	Peak position
Canada (RPM) Top Singles	61
Canada (RPM) Top AC	20
US Billboard Hot 100	54
US Adult Contemporary (Billboard)	8
