= I'm Coming Home (Johnny Mathis song) =

1973 song by Johnny Mathis

Single by Johnny Mathis

from the album I'm Coming Home
- B-side: "Stop Look and Listen to Your Heart"
- Released: July 27, 1973
- Recorded: 1973
- Genre: Easy listening
- Length: 3:15
- Label: Columbia
- Songwriters: Thom Bell, Linda Creed
- Producer: Thom Bell

Johnny Mathis singles chronology
"Show and Tell" (1973)	"I'm Coming Home" (1973)	"Life Is a Song Worth Singing" (1973)

"I'm Coming Home" is the title track from the 1973 album by Johnny Mathis. The song was written by Thom Bell and Linda Creed.

== Chart performance ==
"I'm Coming Home" was Mathis' only release as a solo artist to make it to number one on the Billboard Easy Listening chart. "I'm Coming Home" went to number one for a single week in September 1973. The single was also a minor pop hit; it peaked at number seventy-five on the Billboard Hot 100.

"I'm Coming Home"

Single by The Spinners

from the album Mighty Love
- B-side: "He'll Never Love You Like I Do"
- Released: May 1974
- Recorded: 1974
- Studio: Sigma Sound, Philadelphia, Pennsylvania
- Genre: R&B, disco
- Length: 3:22
- Label: Atlantic
- Songwriters: Thom Bell, Linda Creed
- Producer: Thom Bell

The Spinners singles chronology
"Mighty Love" (1973)	"I'm Coming Home" (1974)	"Then Came You" (1974)

== Cover versions ==
The Spinners re-recorded the song for their 1974 album, Mighty Love, on which writers Thom Bell and Linda Creed also worked. Their version peaked at number eighteen on the Billboard Hot 100 and number three on the Hot Soul Singles chart.

== See also ==
- List of Billboard Easy Listening number ones of 1973
