= Gene Page =

American arranger (1939–1998)

- Born: Eugene Edgar Page Jr. September 13, 1939; Los Angeles, California, U.S.
- Died: August 24, 1998 (aged 58) Los Angeles, California, U.S.
- Genres: R&B, soul, pop, funk, jazz, dance, disco
- Occupations: Pianist, Arranger, Composer and Producer
- Instruments: Piano, Violin
- Years active: 1960–1998
- Labels: Atlantic Records; Arista Records

Eugene Edgar Page Jr. (September 13, 1939 – August 24, 1998) was an American conductor, composer, arranger and record producer, most active from the mid-1960s through the mid-1980s.

His sound can be heard in the arrangements he did for Jefferson Starship, the Righteous Brothers, the Supremes, the Four Tops, Barbra Streisand, Johnny Mathis, Donna Loren, Nancy Wilson, Martha and the Vandellas, Cher, Harriet Schock, Barry White, the Love Unlimited Orchestra, Dionne Warwick, Aretha Franklin, Whitney Houston, George Benson, the Jackson 5, Roberta Flack, Jim Ford, Elton John ("Philadelphia Freedom"), Leo Sayer, Marvin Gaye, the Temptations, Lovesmith, Michael Lovesmith, Frankie Valli, Helen Reddy and Lionel Richie among many other notable acts in popular music.

In addition, he released four solo albums and scored various motion picture soundtracks that include Brewster McCloud and Fun with Dick and Jane. In 1972, he was hired to score the Blaxplotation film Blacula.

Gene Page was the brother of musician, songwriter, and producer Billy Page.

== Death ==
Page died after a long-term illness of severe alcoholism at UCLA Medical Center in Westwood, Los Angeles, on August 24, 1998, at age 58.

== Discography ==
=== Studio albums ===
List of studio albums, with selected details and peak chart positions
Year	Title	Chart positions		Record label
Year	Title	US	US R&B	Record label
1974	Hot City	156	41	Atlantic Records
1976	Lovelock!	—	45	Atlantic Records
1978	Close Encounters	—	—	Arista Records
1980	Love Starts After Dark	—	—	Arista Records
"—" denotes the album failed to chart

With Big Joe Turner

- The Real Boss of the Blues (BluesTime, 1969)

=== Singles ===
List of singles, with peak chart positions
Year	Title	Chart positions		
Year	Title	US Bub.	US R&B	US Dance
1974	"Satin Soul"	—	—	4
1975	"All Our Dreams Are Coming True"	4	—	9
1976	"Into My Thing"	—	—	—
1976	"Fantasy Woman"	—	—	—
1978	"Close Encounters of the Third Kind"	—	30	—
1978	"Moonglow And Love Theme"	—	—	—
1978	"Theme From 'Star Trek'"	—	—	—
1980	"Love Starts After Dark'"	—	—	—
1980	"With You In The Night"	—	—	—
"—" denotes the single failed to chart

== See also ==
- List of music arrangers
