= The Complete Christmas Collection 1958–2010 =

Box set by Johnny Mathis
- Released: November 6, 2015
- Recorded: 1958–2010
- Genre: Christmas
- Length: 3:49:11
- Label: Real Gone Music; Sony Music Entertainment

Johnny Mathis chronology
The Singles (2015)	The Complete Christmas Collection 1958–2010 (2015)	Johnny Mathis Sings the Great New American Songbook (2017)

Professional ratings
Review scores
Source	Rating
Allmusic	3.5/5 stars
The Wall Street Journal	positive

The Complete Christmas Collection 1958–2010 is a three-disc box set by American pop singer Johnny Mathis that was released in 2015 by Real Gone Music under license from Columbia Records. The set includes Mathis's five holiday albums from the period in their entirety: Merry Christmas, Sounds of Christmas, Give Me Your Love for Christmas, Christmas Eve with Johnny Mathis, and The Christmas Album. It also compiles all of Mathis's holiday songs that were only released as singles, as well as thematically appropriate tracks from his non-holiday albums: "When a Child Is Born" from I Only Have Eyes for You, the holiday version of "What a Wonderful World" from Let It Be Me, and his two recordings of "Ave Maria" from Good Night, Dear Lord, which bookend the set.

== Critical reception ==
Marc Myers of The Wall Street Journal offered high praise. "It's hard to imagine any pop singer who has recorded more definitive versions of holiday songs than Johnny Mathis," He also described the collection as "71 tracks of ecstatic vocals".

Stephen Thomas Erlewine of Allmusic wrote, "Throughout it all, Mathis adheres to his effortless elegance," and that "Mathis's holiday albums are warm and inviting, the ideal soundtrack to snowy evenings or an afternoon of wrapping presents and trimming the tree, so it's nice to have all of them in one handy place."

== Track listing ==
=== Disc one ===
1. "Ave Maria" (Johann Sebastian Bach, Charles Gounod) – 2:59
  - from his 1958 album Good Night, Dear Lord
2. "Winter Wonderland" (Felix Bernard, Richard B. Smith) – 3:14
3. "The Christmas Song" (Mel Tormé, Robert Wells) – 4:18
4. "Sleigh Ride" (Leroy Anderson, Mitchell Parish) – 2:57
5. "Blue Christmas" (Bill Hayes, Jay Johnson) – 3:02
6. "I'll Be Home for Christmas" (Kim Gannon, Walter Kent, Buck Ram) – 4:04
7. "White Christmas" (Irving Berlin) – 3:28
8. "O Holy Night" (Adolphe Adam, John Sullivan Dwight) – 4:35
9. "What Child Is This? (Greensleeves)" (William Chatterton Dix) – 3:58
10. "The First Noel" (traditional) – 3:49
11. "Silver Bells" (Ray Evans, Jay Livingston) – 3:32
12. "It Came Upon a Midnight Clear" (Edmund Hamilton Sears, Richard Storrs Willis) – 3:08
13. "Silent Night" (Franz Xaver Gruber, Joseph Mohr) – 3:49
  - tracks 2–13 from his 1958 album Merry Christmas
14. "Ol' Kris Kringle" (Hugh Adamson, Jimmy McHugh) – 2:24
15. "Give Me Your Love for Christmas" (1961 version) (Jack Gold, Phyllis Stohn) – 2:55
  - above two 1961 recordings first released on his 2014 compilation The Classic Christmas Album
16. "Christmas Eve" (Allyn Ferguson, Sidney Shaw) – 2:56
17. "My Kind of Christmas" (Jerry Livingston, Paul Francis Webster) – 3:02
  - above two released as a single on 11/17/61
18. "The Sounds of Christmas" (Jerry Livingston, Paul Francis Webster) – 2:35
19. "Have Yourself a Merry Little Christmas" from Meet Me in St. Louis (Ralph Blane, Hugh Martin) – 3:34
20. "A Marshmallow World" (Peter DeRose, Carl Sigman) – 2:37
21. "God Rest Ye Merry Gentlemen" (Traditional) – 3:19
22. "Let It Snow! Let It Snow! Let It Snow!" (Sammy Cahn, Jule Styne) – 4:12
  - tracks 18–22 from his 1963 album Sounds of Christmas

Personnel

- tracks 1–17 performed with Percy Faith & His Orchestra
- Mitch Miller – producer (tracks 1–13)
- Al Ham – producer (tracks 2–13); associate producer (track 1)
- Irving Townsend – producer (tracks 14–17)
- Don Costa – producer (tracks 18–22)
- Lou Halmy – arranger (track 14)
- Glenn Osser – arranger (tracks 18–22)
- Jack Feierman – conductor (tracks 18–22)

Recording dates

- January 3, 1958 – track 1
- June 16, 1958 – tracks 3, 6, 7, 11
- June 18, 1958 – tracks 2, 4, 5, 8
- June 20, 1958 – tracks 9, 10, 12, 13
- September 11, 1961 – tracks 14–17
- July 12, 1963 – track 18
- July 17, 1963 – tracks 19, 20, 22
- July 25, 1963 – track 21

=== Disc two ===
1. "The Little Drummer Boy" (Katherine Davis, Henry Onorati, Harry Simeone) – 3:32
2. "Have Reindeer, Will Travel" (Jerry Livingston, Paul Francis Webster) – 3:31
3. "The Secret of Christmas" (Sammy Cahn, Jimmy Van Heusen) – 4:12
4. "Rudolph the Red-Nosed Reindeer" (Johnny Marks) – 2:20
5. "Carol of the Bells" (Peter J. Wilhousky) – 1:22
6. "Christmas Is a Feeling in Your Heart" (Joe Darion, Joe Kleinsinger) – 3:03
7. "Hallelujah Chorus" (George Frederick Handel) – 4:02
  - tracks 1–7 from his 1963 album Sounds of Christmas
8. "Jingle Bell Rock" (Joseph Carleton Beal, James Ross Boothe) – 2:11
9. "Have Yourself a Merry Little Christmas" from Meet Me in St. Louis (Ralph Blane, Hugh Martin) – 3:29
10. "My Favorite Things" from The Sound of Music (Richard Rodgers, Oscar Hammerstein II)– 2:37
11. "Give Me Your Love for Christmas" (Jack Gold, Phyllis Stohn) – 2:37
12. "Santa Claus Is Coming to Town" (J. Fred Coots, Haven Gillespie) – 2:19
13. "What Are You Doing New Year's Eve?" (Frank Loesser) – 2:52
14. "Do You Hear What I Hear?" (Gloria Shayne Baker, Noel Regney) – 3:21
15. "Calypso Noel" (Gordon Krunnfusz) – 2:13
16. "The Little Drummer Boy" (Katherine Davis, Henry Onorati, Harry Simeone) – 2:28
17. "Christmas Day" from Promises, Promises (Burt Bacharach, Hal David) – 3:24
18. "The Lord's Prayer" (Albert Hay Malotte) – 2:40
  - tracks 8–18 from his 1969 album Give Me Your Love for Christmas
19. "Sign of the Dove" (Bradford Craig) – 2:49
20. "Christmas Is..." (Percy Faith, Spence Maxwell) – 3:06
  - above two released as a single on 11/23/70
21. "When a Child Is Born" (Ciro Dammicco, Fred Jay) – 3:41
  - from his 1976 album I Only Have Eyes for You
22. "The Very First Christmas Day" (Clark Gassman, Molly-Ann Leikin) – 3:07
23. "Christmas in the City of the Angels" (Suzy Elman; Arnold Goland; Jack Gold) – 2:50
  - above two released as a single on 11/8/79
24. "The Lord's Prayer" (Albert Hay Malotte) – 3:26
25. "When a Child Is Born" (Ciro Dammicco, Fred Jay) – 3:52
  - above two released as a single on 11/18/80

Personnel

- tracks 24–25 performed with Gladys Knight & the Pips
- Don Costa – producer (tracks 1–7)
- Jack Gold – producer (tracks 8–25)
- Glenn Osser – arranger (tracks 1–7)
- Ernie Freeman – arranger (tracks 8–19), conductor (tracks 8–20)
- Gene Page – arranger, conductor (tracks 21–25)
- Jack Feierman – conductor (tracks 1–7)
- no arranger is indicated for track 20

Recording dates

- July 12, 1963 – track 3
- July 16, 1963 – tracks 2, 6
- July 17, 1963 – tracks 4, 5, 7
- July 25, 1963 – track 1
- July 15, 1969 – tracks 10, 11, 14, 17
- September 23, 1969 – tracks 8, 9, 12, 13, 15, 16, 18
- October 30, 1970 – tracks 19, 20
- February 23, 1976 – March 5, 1976 – track 21
- June 5, 1979 – tracks 22, 23
- April 23, 1979 – track 25
- May 21, 1979 – track 24

=== Disc three ===
1. "It's Beginning to Look a Lot Like Christmas" (Meredith Willson) – 2:14
2. "Toyland" (Glen MacDonough, Victor Herbert) – 3:41
3. "It's the Most Wonderful Time of the Year" (Edward Pola, George Wyle) – 2:45
4. "Jingle Bells" (James Pierpont) – 2:54
5. Medley – 5:09
  a. "Christmas Is for Everyone" (Richard Loring, Dorothy Wayne)
  b. "Where Can I Find Christmas?" from The Bear Who Slept Through Christmas (Doug Goodwin)
6. Medley from Santa Claus: The Movie – 4:03
  a. "Every Christmas Eve" (Leslie Bricusse, Henry Mancini)
  b. "Giving (Santa's Theme)" (Leslie Bricusse, Henry Mancini)
7. "The Christmas Waltz" (Sammy Cahn, Jule Styne) – 2:36
8. "We Need a Little Christmas" from Mame (Jerry Herman) – 1:54
9. Medley – 3:44
  a. "Caroling, Caroling" (Alfred Burt, Wilha Hutson)
  b. "Happy Holiday" from Holiday Inn (Irving Berlin)
10. "It's Christmas Time Again" (Sonny Burke, John Elliot, James K. Harwood) – 4:28
  - tracks 1–10 from his 1986 album Christmas Eve with Johnny Mathis
11. "O Tannenbaum" (Ernst Anschütz) – 2:57
  - from Mannheim Steamroller's 2001 album Christmas Extraordinaire
12. "Joy To The World" (Lowell Mason, Isaac Watts) – 2:01
13. "Heavenly Peace" (Dean Pitchford, Tom Snow) – 3:30
14. "Away in a Manger" (William J. Kirkpatrick) – 2:30
15. "A Christmas Love Song" (Alan and Marilyn Bergman, Johnny Mandel) – 3:35
16. "Frosty the Snowman" (Steve Nelson, Jack Rollins) – 2:31
17. "Have a Holly Jolly Christmas" (Johnny Marks) – 2:00
18. "O Little Town of Bethlehem" (Phillip Brooks, Lewis H. Redner) – 2:44
19. "I've Got My Love to Keep Me Warm" (Irving Berlin) – 3:34
20. Medley – 5:00
  a. "Snowfall" (Claude Thornhill)
  b. "Christmas Time Is Here" from A Charlie Brown Christmas (Vince Guaraldi, Lee Mendelson)
21. "Merry Christmas" (Fred Spielman, Janice Torre) – 3:12
  - tracks 12–21 from his 2002 album The Christmas Album
22. Medley – 2:47
  a. "Winter Wonderland" (Felix Bernard, Richard B. Smith)
  b. "Let It Snow! Let It Snow! Let It Snow!" (Sammy Cahn, Jule Styne)
  - from Bette Midler's 2006 album Cool Yule
23. "What a Wonderful World" (Christmas Version) (Bob Thiele, George David Weiss) – 4:31
  - from his 2010 album Let It Be Me
24. "Ave Maria" (Franz Schubert) – 4:34
  - from his 1958 album Good Night, Dear Lord

Personnel

- track 5 performed with the Henry Mancini Orchestra & Chorus
- track 11 performed with Mannheim Steamroller
- track 22 performed with Bette Midler
- track 23 performed with Lane Brody
- Denny Diante – producer (tracks 1–10)
- Chip Davis – producer, arranger, conductor (track 11)
- Robbie Buchanan – producer (tracks 12–22), arranger (tracks 13, 14)
- Fred Mollin – producer (track 23)
- Mitch Miller – producer (track 24)
- Scott Erickson – associate producer (tracks 12–21)
- Al Ham – associate producer (track 24)
- Bette Sussman – co-producer, track arranger, vocal arranger (track 22)
- Jeremy Lubbock – arranger, conductor (tracks 1, 3, 9, 10)
- Ray Ellis – arranger, conductor (tracks 2, 4, 5, 7, 8); arranger (track 17)
- Henry Mancini – arranger, conductor (track 6)
- Bob Krogstad – arranger (tracks 12, 16, 19, 20)
- Alan Broadbent – arranger (track 15)
- Jonathan Tunick – arranger (tracks 18, 21)
- Patrick Williams – orchestral arranger, track arranger, vocal arranger (track 22)
- Matthew McCauley – strings arranger and conductor (track 23)
- International Children's Choir (Irene Bayless, director) – backing vocals (track 5)
- The kids from St. Michael's School, North Hollywood – backing vocals (track 5)

Recording dates

- January 3, 1958 – track 24
- July 1986 – tracks 1–10
- 2001 – track 11
- 2002 – tracks 12–21
- 2006 – track 22
- 2009–2010 – track 23

== Additional personnel ==
=== Original recordings ===
- Johnny Mathis – vocals

=== Box set ===
- Gordon Anderson – producer
- Didier C. Deutsch – Sony producer
- Jeff James – Sony producer
- Mike Piacentini – remastering
- CEA/Cache Agency – front cover photo
- Wayne Knight/Starline Productions – wallet photo & page 11 booklet photo
- Tom D. Kline – design
- Joe Marchese – liner notes
- Remastered at Battery Studios, New York City
