= The Christmas Music of Johnny Mathis: A Personal Collection =

Compilation album by Johnny Mathis
- Released: October 5, 1993
- Recorded: 1958–1986
- Genre: Vocal; holiday
- Length: 42:19
- Label: Columbia

Johnny Mathis chronology
How Do You Keep the Music Playing? (1993)	The Christmas Music of Johnny Mathis: A Personal Collection (1993)	The Music of Johnny Mathis: A Personal Collection (1993)

Professional ratings
Review scores
Source	Rating
Allmusic	4.5/5 stars
The Encyclopedia of Popular Music	3/5 stars

The Christmas Music of Johnny Mathis: A Personal Collection is a compilation album by American pop singer Johnny Mathis that was released in October 1993 by Columbia Records and included selections from the four Christmas albums that he had recorded to date: Merry Christmas, Sounds of Christmas, Give Me Your Love for Christmas, and Christmas Eve with Johnny Mathis.

The album made its first appearance on Billboard magazine's album chart in the issue dated December 18, 1993, and remained there for three weeks, peaking at number 162. It received Gold certification from the Recording Industry Association of America for sales of 500,000 copies on December 20, 2001 and achieved peak positions of 29 on the magazine's Christmas Albums chart and 30 on its Top Pop Catalog chart in December 2002.

== Reception ==
In his review of this release, Stephen Thomas Erlewine of AllMusic wrote, "Even though the collection spans several decades, it's remarkably consistent because Mathis's style stayed essentially the same, no matter what the current fads may have been. Also, the collection is strong simply because the compilers have selected many great performances."

== Track listing ==
1. "Silent Night" (Franz Xaver Gruber, Joseph Mohr) – 3:49
2. "Silver Bells" (Ray Evans, Jay Livingston) – 3:32
3. "Winter Wonderland" (Felix Bernard, Richard B. Smith) – 3:14
4. "Sleigh Ride" (Leroy Anderson, Mitchell Parish) – 2:57
5. "White Christmas" (Irving Berlin) – 3:28
6. "Let It Snow! Let It Snow! Let It Snow!" (Sammy Cahn, Jule Styne) – 4:14
7. "A Marshmallow World" (Peter DeRose, Carl Sigman) – 2:40
8. "Have Yourself a Merry Little Christmas" (Ralph Blane, Hugh Martin) – 3:28
9. "The Little Drummer Boy" (Katherine K. Davis, Henry Onorati, Harry Simeone) – 2:26
10. "Santa Claus Is Comin' to Town" (J. Fred Coots, Haven Gillespie) – 2:20
11. "It's Beginning to Look a Lot Like Christmas" (Meredith Willson) – 2:14
12. "The Christmas Waltz" (Sammy Cahn, Jule Styne) – 2:36
13. "We Need a Little Christmas" (Jerry Herman) – 1:54
14. "It's the Most Wonderful Time of the Year" (Edward Pola, George Wyle) – 2:45

== Personnel ==
Original albums

- Johnny Mathis – vocals

Tracks 1–5 (from his 1958 album Merry Christmas)

- performed with Percy Faith & His Orchestra
- Al Ham – producer
- Mitch Miller – producer

Tracks 6–7 (from his 1963 album Sounds of Christmas)

- Glenn Osser – arranger^{[A]}
- Jack Feierman – conductor
- Don Costa – producer
- ^{A} While the original album credited Costa as the arranger, the three compilations noted below all list Costa as the producer and Osser as the arranger of these tracks.

Tracks 8–10 (from his 1969 album Give Me Your Love for Christmas)

- Ernie Freeman – arranger, conductor
- Jack Gold – producer

Tracks 11–14 (from his 1986 album Christmas Eve with Johnny Mathis)

- Jeremy Lubbock – arranger, conductor ("It's Beginning to Look a Lot Like Christmas", "It's the Most Wonderful Time of the Year")
- Ray Ellis – arranger, conductor ("The Christmas Waltz", "We Need a Little Christmas")
- Denny Diante – producer
Compilation

- Didier C. Deutsch – producer
- Mark Wilder – digital remastering
- Adam Block – project director
- Mike Berniker – A&R liaison
- Allen Weinberg – art direction
- Julian Peploe – designer
- Hope Chasin – packaging manager
- Tony Natelli – project consultant
- David Vance – cover photo
- Digitally remastered at Sony Music Studios, New York

== Bibliography ==
- Whitburn, Joel (2004), Christmas in the Charts (1920-2004), Record Research Inc., ISBN 0-89820-161-6
- Whitburn, Joel (2010), Joel Whitburn Presents Top Pop Albums, Seventh Edition, Record Research Inc., ISBN 978-0-89820-183-3
