= Gold: A 50th Anniversary Christmas Celebration =

Compilation album by Johnny Mathis
- Released: September 19, 2006
- Recorded: 1958–2006
- Genre: Vocal; holiday; pop/rock
- Length: 49:23
- Label: Columbia

Johnny Mathis chronology
The Very Best of Johnny Mathis (2006)	Gold: A 50th Anniversary Christmas Celebration (2006)	Gold: A 50th Anniversary Celebration (2006)

Professional ratings
Review scores
Source	Rating
Allmusic	3.5/5 stars

Gold: A 50th Anniversary Christmas Celebration is a compilation album by American pop singer Johnny Mathis that was released on September 19, 2006, by Columbia Records and Legacy Recordings. It includes selections from four of the first five Christmas albums that he had recorded: Merry Christmas, Sounds of Christmas, Christmas Eve with Johnny Mathis, and The Christmas Album. Two tracks that were recorded with other artists are also included: "O Tannenbaum", which comes from Mannheim Steamroller's 2001 album Christmas Extraordinaire, and a medley duet of "Winter Wonderland" and "Let It Snow! Let It Snow! Let It Snow!" with Bette Midler from her 2006 holiday album Cool Yule.

This first of his two 50th anniversary compilations reached number 191 during its first seasonal appearance on Billboard magazine's album chart in the issue dated December 30, 2006. The second of the two compilations, Gold: A 50th Anniversary Celebration (which was released two months after this one, on November 21), charted for one week in that same issue but positioned slightly higher, at 171. Gold: A 50th Anniversary Christmas Celebration made annual chart runs on the Billboard 200 from 2013 to 2017 and had its best showing in 2016 when it reached number 104.

== Reception ==
John Bush of AllMusic describes the compilation as "a solid collection" and Mathis as "a wonderful holiday singer, easily able to summon the congenial warmth and energetic cheerfulness that made his version of "Sleigh Ride" a perennial hit."

== Track listing ==
1. "Sleigh Ride" (Leroy Anderson, Mitchell Parish) – 2:57
2. "The Christmas Song (Chestnuts Roasting on an Open Fire)" (Mel Tormé, Robert Wells) – 4:17
3. "Silver Bells" (Ray Evans, Jay Livingston) – 3:32
4. "Silent Night" (Franz Xaver Gruber, Joseph Mohr) – 3:49
5. "O Holy Night" (Adolphe Adam, John Sullivan Dwight) – 4:33
6. "Have Yourself a Merry Little Christmas" (Ralph Blane, Hugh Martin) – 3:28
7. "It's Beginning to Look a Lot Like Christmas" (Meredith Willson) – 2:14
8. "It's the Most Wonderful Time of the Year" (Edward Pola, George Wyle) – 2:45
9. "Toyland" (Glen MacDonough, Victor Herbert) – 3:41
10. Medley – 3:44
  a. "Caroling, Caroling" (Alfred Burt, Wilha Hutson)
  b. "Happy Holiday" (Irving Berlin)
11. "The Christmas Waltz" (Sammy Cahn, Jule Styne) – 2:36
12. "Have a Holly Jolly Christmas" (Johnny Marks) – 2:00
13. "I've Got My Love to Keep Me Warm" (Irving Berlin) – 3:34
14. "O Tannenbaum" performed with Mannheim Steamroller (Ernst Anschütz) – 2:57
15. Medley performed with Bette Midler – 2:47
  a. "Winter Wonderland" (Felix Bernard, Richard B. Smith)
  b. "Let It Snow! Let It Snow! Let It Snow!" (Sammy Cahn, Jule Styne)

== Personnel ==
Original albums

- Johnny Mathis – vocals

Tracks 1–5 (from his 1958 album Merry Christmas)
- performed with Percy Faith & His Orchestra
- Al Ham – producer
- Mitch Miller – producer
Track 6 (from his 1963 album Sounds of Christmas)
- Glenn Osser – arranger^{[A]}
- Jack Feierman – conductor
- Don Costa – producer
- ^{A} While the original album credited Costa as the arranger, this and two other compilations noted below all list Costa as the producer and Osser as the arranger of this track.
Tracks 7–11 (from his 1986 album Christmas Eve with Johnny Mathis)
- Jeremy Lubbock – arranger, conductor ("Caroling, Caroling/Happy Holiday", "It's Beginning to Look a Lot Like Christmas", "It's the Most Wonderful Time of the Year")
- Ray Ellis – arranger, conductor ("The Christmas Waltz", "Toyland")
- Denny Diante – producer
Tracks 12–13 (from his 2002 album The Christmas Album)
- Ray Ellis – arranger ("Have a Holly Jolly Christmas")
- Bob Krogstad – arranger ("I've Got My Love to Keep Me Warm")
- Ken Krogstad – conductor
- Robbie Buchanan – producer
Track 14 (from Mannheim Steamroller's 2001 album Christmas Extraordinaire)
- Chip Davis – arranger, producer
Track 15 (from Bette Midler's 2006 album Cool Yule)
- Bette Sussman – track arranger, vocal arranger, additional lyrics
- Patrick Williams – orchestral arranger, track arranger, vocal arranger
- Eric Kornfeld – additional lyrics
- Bette Midler – additional lyrics
- Robbie Buchanan – producer
Compilation

- Johnny Mathis – executive producer
- Jay Landers – executive producer; A&R for Columbia Records
- Didier C. Deutsch – producer
- Mark Wilder – mastering
- Steve Berkowitz – A&R
- Patti Matheny – A&R
- Stacey Boyle – A&R
- Howard Fritzson – art direction
- Mark Larson – design
- Peter Fletcher – product direction
- Mandy Eidgah – product direction
- Omar Carrasquilla – tape research
- Mike Kull – tape research
- David Vance – photography
- Seawell – photography
- Russell Laschinger – photography
- Mastered at Sony Music Studios, New York

== Charts ==
=== Billboard 200 ===
Holiday season	Peak position
2006	191
2013	114
2014	123
2015	112
2016	104
2017	177

== Bibliography ==
- Whitburn, Joel (2010), Joel Whitburn Presents Top Pop Albums, Seventh Edition, Record Research Inc., ISBN 0-89820-183-7
