= The Classic Christmas Album (Johnny Mathis album) =

Compilation album by Johnny Mathis
- Released: October 7, 2014
- Recorded: 1958–2013
- Genre: Christmas
- Length: 39:51
- Label: Columbia

Johnny Mathis chronology
| Sending You a Little Christmas (2013) | The Classic Christmas Album (2014) | The Complete Global Albums Collection (2014) |

Professional ratings
Review scores
| Source | Rating |
|---|---|
| JazzWeekly.com | positive |
| TheSecondDisc.com | positive |

The Classic Christmas Album is a Christmas compilation album by American pop singer Johnny Mathis that was released on October 7, 2014, by Columbia Records and includes two 1961 recordings that were previously unavailable: "Ol' Kris Kringle" and the original version of the title track from his 1969 Christmas album Give Me Your Love for Christmas. Three other songs ("Christmas in the City of the Angels", "Sign of the Dove" and "The Very First Christmas Day") make their debut on compact disc as of this release, and two other non-album singles ("Christmas Is..." and "My Kind of Christmas") can be counted among the rarities here. The collection also includes a selection or two from several of Mathis's Christmas studio albums—"Sleigh Ride" from Merry Christmas, "Have Yourself a Merry Little Christmas" from Sounds of Christmas, "Calypso Noel" from Give Me Your Love for Christmas, "The Christmas Waltz" and "It's Beginning to Look a Lot Like Christmas" from Christmas Eve with Johnny Mathis, and "Home for the Holidays" from Sending You a Little Christmas—as well as his duet with Bette Midler from her 2006 holiday album Cool Yule, which was a medley of "Winter Wonderland" and "Let It Snow! Let It Snow! Let It Snow!".

== Critical reception ==
The Second Disc's Joe Marchese was impressed by the rarities on this collection ("Didier C. Deutsch and Jeff James have gone the extra mile") and also the sound quality ("Maria Triana has beautifully remastered all tracks.").

George W. Harris of Jazz Weekly wrote in his review of the disc that Mathis is "one of the few vocalists that owns 'Have Yourself a Merry Little Christmas', and December 25th is better off for it."

== Track listing ==
1. "It's Beginning to Look a Lot Like Christmas" (Meredith Willson) – 2:14
  - Jeremy Lubbock – arranger, conductor
  - Denny Diante – producer
2. "Ol' Kris Kringle" performed with Percy Faith & His Orchestra (Hugh Adamson, Jimmy McHugh) – 2:24
  - Lou Halmy – arranger
  - Irving Townsend – producer
3. "The Very First Christmas Day" (Clark Gassman, Molly-Ann Leikin) – 3:07
  - Gene Page – arranger, conductor
  - Jack Gold – producer
4. "Calypso Noel" (Gordon Krunnfusz) – 2:14
  - Ernie Freeman – arranger, conductor
  - Jack Gold – producer
5. "My Kind of Christmas" performed with Percy Faith & His Orchestra (Jerry Livingston, Paul Francis Webster) – 3:02
  - Irving Townsend – producer
6. Medley performed with Bette Midler – 2:47
  a. "Winter Wonderland" (Felix Bernard, Richard Bernhard Smith)
  b. "Let It Snow! Let It Snow! Let It Snow!" (Sammy Cahn, Jule Styne)
  - Bette Sussman – arranger
  - Patrick Williams – arranger
  - Robbie Buchanan – producer
7. "Give Me Your Love for Christmas" performed with Percy Faith & His Orchestra (Jack Gold, Phyllis Stohn) – 2:55
  - Irving Townsend – producer
8. "Sleigh Ride" performed with Percy Faith & His Orchestra (Leroy Anderson, Mitchell Parish) – 3:01
  - Mitch Miller – producer
9. "The Christmas Waltz" (Sammy Cahn, Jule Styne) – 2:36
  - Ray Ellis – arranger, conductor
  - Denny Diante – producer
10. "Christmas in the City of the Angels" (Suzy Elman; Arnold Goland; Jack Gold) – 2:50
  - Gene Page – arranger, conductor
  - Jack Gold – producer
11. "Christmas Is..." (Percy Faith, Spence Maxwell) – 3:06
  - Ernie Freeman – arranger, conductor
  - Jack Gold – producer
12. "Have Yourself a Merry Little Christmas" (Ralph Blane, Hugh Martin) – 3:33
  - Glenn Osser – arranger
  - Jack Feierman – conductor
  - Don Costa – producer
13. "Home for the Holidays" performed with The Jordanaires (Robert Allen, Al Stillman) – 3:07
  - Fred Mollin – producer
14. "Sign of the Dove" (Bradford Craig) – 2:49
  - Ernie Freeman – arranger, conductor
  - Jack Gold – producer

== Recording dates ==
- June 18, 1958 – "Sleigh Ride"
- September 11, 1961 – "Give Me Your Love for Christmas", "My Kind of Christmas", "Ol' Kris Kringle"
- July 17, 1963 – "Have Yourself a Merry Little Christmas"
- September 23, 1969 – "Calypso Noel"
- October 30, 1970 – "Christmas Is...", "Sign of the Dove"
- June 5, 1979 – "Christmas in the City of the Angels", "The Very First Christmas Day"
- July 1986 – "The Christmas Waltz", "It's Beginning to Look a Lot Like Christmas"
- 2006 – "Winter Wonderland/Let It Snow! Let It Snow! Let It Snow!"
- 2013 – "Home for the Holidays"

== Personnel ==
- Johnny Mathis – vocals

Compilation

- Didier C. Deutsch – producer
- Jeffrey James – producer
- Maria Triana – mastering
- Mike Kull – tape research
- Mike Cimicata – project direction
- Mike Curry/Skouras Design – art direction
- LFI/Photoshot – photography
- Mastered at Battery Studios, New York City
