= A Special Part of Me =

Studio album by Johnny Mathis
- Released: January 22, 1984
- Recorded: March 9, 1983; April 13, 1983; August 16, 1983
- Studio: Sunset Sound Studios, Hollywood, California
- Genre: R&B; vocal; pop/rock
- Length: 36:37
- Label: Columbia
- Producer: Denny Diante

Johnny Mathis chronology
Unforgettable – A Musical Tribute to Nat King Cole (1983)	A Special Part of Me (1984)	Live (1984)

Professional ratings
Review scores
Source	Rating
Allmusic	2.5/5 stars
The Encyclopedia of Popular Music	3/5 stars

A Special Part of Me is an album by American pop singer Johnny Mathis that was released on January 22, 1984, by Columbia Records and reunited him with his "Too Much, Too Little, Too Late" partner Deniece Williams on one of the LP's two duets, "Love Won't Let Me Wait", which is also the only song on the album that was previously recorded and released by another artist. This continuing trend away from the cover album genre would reach its limit with his next studio release, Right from the Heart, which only had original material.

A Special Part of Me made its first appearance on Billboard magazine's Top LPs & Tapes chart in the issue dated March 10, 1984, and remained there for 19 weeks, peaking at number 157. It also made it to number 45 during a three-week run on the UK album chart that began on September 15 of that year.

"Love Won't Let Me Wait" had its chart debut on Billboard magazine's list of the 100 most popular R&B singles in the US in the issue dated February 25, 1984, where it peaked at number 32 over the course of 12 weeks. The March 24 issue marked its first appearance on the magazine's list of the 50 most popular Adult Contemporary records in the US, where it spent 13 weeks and reached number 14. The next issue, dated March 31, saw its debut on the "Bubbling Under the Hot 100" chart, where it got as high as number 106.

Another song from the album, "Simple", began a 12-week run on the R&B chart two months later, in the May 19 issue, that took the song to number 43. The Adult Contemporary chart in the following issue, dated May 26, was its next debut and the beginning of a 16-week stay, during which time it made it to number six. It also enjoyed eight weeks on the Billboard Hot 100 that began the following month, in the issue dated June 23, giving Mathis a number 81 hit, and reached number eight on the Canadian AC chart.

The fact that the front cover photograph was taken at the Carlyle Hotel in Miami, Florida, and the choice of pastels for both the album design and the clothing Mathis wears in the photo might suggest that the look was inspired by the influential hit show Miami Vice, but the television series debuted on September 16, 1984—eight months after this album was released.

On January 15, 2013, Funkytowngrooves released an expanded edition of the album on compact disc that included two additional versions of "Simple" that came out in 1984 on a separate 12-inch single.

== Track listing ==
From the liner notes for the original album:

1. "Simple" (Marvin Morrow, Keith Stegall) – 3:43
  - Dennis Belfield – bass
  - Michel Colombier – Fender Rhodes, piano, Jupiter 8
  - Bill Cuomo – Prophet
  - David Williams – guitar
  - Jerry Hey – horn arrangements
2. "Love Won't Let Me Wait" performed with Deniece Williams (Vinnie Barrett, Bobby Eli) – 4:16
  - Abe Laboriel – bass
  - Michel Colombier – Fender Rhodes, Jupiter 8, DX7, horn arrangements
  - David Williams – guitar
3. "The Best Is Yet to Come" (Alan Roy Scott, Brian Short) – 4:14
  - Abe Laboriel – bass
  - Michel Colombier – Fender Rhodes, Jupiter 8, horn arrangements
  - David Williams – guitar
4. "Lead Me to Your Love" (Michel Colombier, Kathy Wakefield) – 4:21
  - Dennis Belfield – bass
  - Paulinho da Costa – percussion
  - Michel Colombier – Fender Rhodes, piano, Jupiter 8
  - Bill Cuomo – Prophet
  - Marty Walsh – acoustic guitar
5. "You're a Special Part of Me" performed with Angela Bofill (Angela Bofill, Loree Gold) – 4:13
  - Abe Laboriel – bass
  - Michel Colombier – Fender Rhodes, Jupiter 8, horn arrangements
  - Luis Conte – percussion
  - David Williams – guitar
6. "Love Never Felt So Good" (Paul Anka, Michael Jackson, Kathy Wakefield) – 4:20
  - Nathan East – bass
  - Michel Colombier – Fender Rhodes, Jupiter 8
  - Luis Conte – percussion
  - Marty Walsh – acoustic guitar
  - David Williams – guitar
  - Bill Cuomo – Prophet, Yamaha Chroma
  - Jerry Hey – horn arrangements
7. "Priceless" (Leon Ware) – 4:05
  - Dennis Belfield – bass
  - Paulinho da Costa – percussion
  - Michel Colombier – Fender Rhodes, piano, Jupiter 8
  - Bill Cuomo – Prophet
  - Larry Carlton –guitar
8. "One Love" (Eric Kaz, Wendy Waldman) – 3:58
  - Dennis Belfield – bass
  - Michel Colombier – Fender Rhodes, piano, Jupiter 8
  - Bill Cuomo – Prophet
  - Marty Walsh – guitar
9. "Right Here and Now" (Barry Mann, Cynthia Weil) – 3:27
  - Nathan East – bass
  - Michel Colombier – Fender Rhodes, piano, Jupiter 8, horn arrangements
  - Marty Walsh – acoustic guitar
  - David Williams – guitar
  - Bill Cuomo – Prophet, Yamaha Chroma
  - Jerry Hey – horn arrangements

=== 2013 and 2017 CD bonus tracks ===
These two tracks were mixed by David Todd and Nick Martinelli and released in 1984 as a 12-inch single:

1. "Simple" (Vocal Version) (Marvin Morrow, Keith Stegall) – 5:55
2. "Simple" (Instrumental Version) (Marvin Morrow, Keith Stegall) – 4:52

Both tracks were also included on the 2013 Funkytowngrooves reissue and the album's CD release as part of the 2017 box set The Voice of Romance: The Columbia Original Album Collection.

== Recording dates ==
From the liner notes for the 2013 CD reissue:

- March 9, 1983 – "Lead Me to Your Love", "Love Never Felt So Good", "One Love", "Right Here and Now", "You're a Special Part of Me"
- April 13, 1983 – "Priceless", "Simple" (all versions)
- August 16, 1983 – "The Best Is Yet to Come", "Love Won't Let Me Wait"

== Song information ==
The only cover on this album, "Love Won't Let Me Wait", was a number one R&B hit for Major Harris in 1975. Additionally, the song "Love Never Felt So Good" was based on a demo track by pop singer Michael Jackson, recorded in 1983. The following year, writer Paul Anka gave Mathis permission to use the song, at which point Mathis recorded an R&B remix with revised lyrics by Anka and Kathleen Wakefield. The Jackson version was eventually leaked online in 2006, and received a proper release under Jackson's branding in 2014 as a part of his posthumous album Xscape.

== Personnel ==
=== Original album ===
From the liner notes for the original album:

Performers

- Johnny Mathis – vocals
- Angela Bofill – vocals ("You're a Special Part of Me"), background vocals
- Deniece Williams – vocals ("Love Won't Let Me Wait")
- Wayne Anthony – background vocals
- Endre Granat – concertmaster
- Larry Hall – trumpet
- Jerry Hey – trumpet
- James Ingram – background vocals
- Phillip Ingram – background vocals
- Phil Perry – background vocals
- Darryl Phinnessee – background vocals
- Bill Reichenbach – trombone
- J. R. Robinson – drums
- Ernie Watts – saxophone, all sax solos
- Larry Williams – saxophone

Production

- Denny Diante – producer
- Michel Colombier – arranger; all string arrangements
- Larry Hirsch – recording engineer, mixing engineer
- Bill Jackson – additional engineer
- Terry Christian – additional engineer
- Mike Reese – mastering engineer
- Jo-Anne McGettrick – A&R Coordinator
- F. G. Bodner – front cover wardrobe
- Nancy Donald – design
- Tony Lane – design
- David Vance – photographer
- Mixed at Sunset Sound Studios, Hollywood, California
- Mastered at the Mastering Lab, Los Angeles, California

=== Funkytowngrooves reissue ===
From the liner notes for the 2013 reissue:

- Tony Calvert – reissue producer
- Randy Mahon – assistant reissue producer
- Matt Murphy – production manager
- Gavin Wallace – package design
- Alex Henderson – liner notes
- Mastered by Sean Brennan at Battery Studios, New York, from the original master tapes

== Bibliography ==
- Brooks, Tim; Marsh, Earle (1995), The Complete Directory to Prime Time Network and Cable TV Shows (1946—Present): Sixth Edition, U.S.A.: Ballantine Books, ISBN 0345397363
- Whitburn, Joel (2004), Joel Whitburn Presents Top R&B/Hip-Hop Singles, 1942-2004, Record Research Inc., ISBN 0898201608
- Whitburn, Joel (2007), Joel Whitburn Presents Billboard Top Adult Songs, 1961-2006, Record Research Inc., ISBN 978-0898201697
- Whitburn, Joel (2009), Joel Whitburn's Top Pop Singles, 1955-2008, Record Research Inc., ISBN 978-0898201802 *Whitburn, Joel (2010), Joel Whitburn Presents Top Pop Albums, Seventh Edition, Record Research Inc., ISBN 978-0-89820-183-3
