= Live (Johnny Mathis album) =

Live album by Johnny Mathis
- Released: October 15, 1984
- Recorded: May 1983
- Studios: London Apollo Victoria, London, England
- Genre: Vocal
- Length: 41:06
- Label: Columbia
- Producer: Denny Diante

Johnny Mathis chronology
A Special Part of Me (1984)	Live (Johnny Mathis album) (1984)	Right from the Heart (1985)

Professional ratings
Review scores
Source	Rating
Allmusic	3/5 stars
The Encyclopedia of Popular Music	3/5 stars

Live is a live album by American pop singer Johnny Mathis that was released in October 15, 1984, by Columbia Records and includes performances of some of his classics ("Misty", "The Twelfth of Never", "Chances Are"), songs from recent albums ("Begin the Beguine", "Memory", "Orange Colored Sky"), and three selections that have never appeared on a Mathis studio album ("I Believe in Love", "Fly Away", "Try to Win a Friend").

On October 24, 1995, the album was released for a second time on compact disc as part of a 3-disc set that also included Mathis's 1959 studio album Heavenly and the 1977 stereo reissue of 1958's Johnny's Greatest Hits.

== Reception ==
William Ruhlmann of AllMusic wrote retrospectively: "Mathis has always been an expert at finding and performing music that ties together the often disparate styles of popular music over four decades, and his choices here are characteristic. Of course, he also performs them winningly with effective backup."

== Track listing ==
From the liner notes for the original album:

1. "I Believe in Love" (Alan Bergman, Marilyn Bergman, Kenny Loggins) – 3:31
  - Jim Barnett – arranger
2. "Misty" (Johnny Burke, Erroll Garner) – 3:07
  - Glenn Osser – arranger
3. "Begin the Beguine" (Cole Porter) – 3:47
  - Gene Page – arranger
  - Victor Vanacore – arranger
4. "Fly Away" (Peter Allen, David Foster, Carole Bayer Sager) – 3:46
  - Larry Steelman – arranger
5. "A Certain Smile" (Sammy Fain, Paul Francis Webster) – 3:44
  - Larry Steelman – arranger
6. "Memory" (T. S. Eliot, Trevor Nunn, Andrew Lloyd Webber) – 3:00
  - Gene Page – arranger
  - Larry Steelman – arranger
7. "The Twelfth of Never" (Jerry Livingston, Paul Francis Webster) – 3:06
  - Michel Colombier – arranger
  - Gil Reigers – arranger
8. "Try to Win a Friend" (Larry Gatlin) – 3:30
  - Gil Reigers – arranger
9. "99 Miles from L.A." (Hal David, Albert Hammond) – 3:35
  - Michel Colombier – arranger (strings)
  - Gil Reigers – arranger
10. "Chances Are" (Robert Allen, Al Stillman) – 3:10
  - Ray Conniff – arranger
11. "Orange Colored Sky" (Milton DeLugg, Willie Stein) – 3:09
  - Allyn Ferguson – arranger
12. "When a Child Is Born" (Ciro Dammicco, Fred Jay) – 3:41
  - Jim Barnett – arranger
  - Gene Page – arranger

== Song information ==
"I Believe in Love" was performed by Barbra Streisand on the soundtrack of the 1976 film A Star Is Born but was released as a single by Kenny Loggins in 1977 that reached number 37 on Billboard magazine's list of the 50 most popular Easy Listening songs in the US and number 66 on the Billboard Hot 100. "Fly Away" had its best showing on these two charts by different artists: in 1981 Peter Allen took the song to number 55 on the Hot 100 and number 45 on what was now the Adult Contemporary chart, whereas Stevie Woods made it to number 23 Adult Contemporary and number 84 pop with the song in 1982. And "Try to Win a Friend" was included on two albums in 1973: Larry Gatlin's The Pilgrim and Dottie West's If It's Alright with You/Just What I've Been Looking For.

== Personnel ==
From the liner notes for the original album:

Performers

- Johnny Mathis – vocals
- Jim Ganduglia – conductor
- Michael Bach – bass
- Joe Lizama – drums
- Gil Reigers – guitar
- Larry Steelman – piano

Production

- Denny Diante – producer
- Larry Hirsch – engineer
- Bill Jackson – additional engineer
- Terry Christian – additional engineer
- Jo-Anne McGettrick – A&R Coordinator
- Nancy Donald – design
- Tony Lane – design
- Sam Emerson – photographer
- Mixed at Sunset Sound Studios, Hollywood, California

== Bibliography ==
- Whitburn, Joel (2007), Joel Whitburn Presents Billboard Top Adult Songs, 1961-2006, Record Research Inc., ISBN 0898201691
- Whitburn, Joel (2009), Joel Whitburn's Top Pop Singles, 1955-2008, Record Research Inc., ISBN 0898201802
