= Mathis on Broadway =

Studio album by Johnny Mathis
- Released: April 25, 2000
- Recorded: 2000
- Studio: Cello (Hollywood); Capitol (Hollywood); Randini (Los Angeles); Sony (Santa Monica, California); Encore (Burbank, California); The Hop (Los Angeles); Sound on Sound (New York City)
- Genre: Vocal
- Length: 33:10
- Label: Columbia
- Producer: Jay Landers; Richard Jay-Alexander; William Ross; Randy Waldman; Jorge Calandrelli; Jonathan Tunick

Johnny Mathis chronology
Because You Loved Me: The Songs of Diane Warren (1998)	Mathis on Broadway (2000)	The Christmas Album (2002)

Professional ratings
Review scores
Source	Rating
Allmusic	3/5 stars
Billboard	positive
TheaterMania.com	positive
The Encyclopedia of Popular Music	4/5 stars

Mathis on Broadway is an album by American pop singer Johnny Mathis that was released on April 25, 2000, by Columbia Records and focuses upon songs included in musicals from the previous two decades.

== Reception ==
Reviews of the singer's most recent tribute to the Great White Way were positive: Michael Portantiere of TheaterMania.com wrote that "Mathis comes across with the smooth, rich, velvety vocalism for which he is legendary," noting that certain songs covered on the album "require the kind of breath support, legato, and phrasing that precious few singers of Mathis's age can supply. But this guy still has the right stuff, in abundance." Billboard magazine echoed these sentiments: "The legendary performer breathes fresh perspective into songs that might sound overdone in lesser hands." And William Ruhlmann of AllMusic goes so far as to say that "the lesser talents among the composers -- Lloyd Webber, Wildhorn, Claude-Michel Schönberg -- owe Mathis a debt for making their music sound so good, while Sondheim can be grateful that Mathis makes him sound so accessible.

== Track listing ==
From the liner notes for the original album:

1. "On Broadway" from Smokey Joe's Cafe (Barry Mann, Cynthia Weil, Jerry Leiber, Mike Stoller) – 3:24
  - William Ross – producer, arranger, conductor
  - Jay Landers – producer
  - Richard Jay-Alexander – producer
  - Al Schmitt – recording engineer, mixing engineer
  - Randy Waldman – piano
  - David Boruff – saxophone
  - Dean Parks – guitar
  - Chuck Domanico – bass
  - John Robinson – drums
  - Paulinho da Costa – percussion
  - Alex Acuña – percussion
  - Efrain Toro – percussion
  - Maxine Waters – background vocals
  - Julia Waters – background vocals
  - Oren Waters – background vocals
2. "Life Is Just a Bowl of Cherries" from Fosse (featuring Forever Plaid) (Lew Brown, Ray Henderson) – 2:46
  - Jorge Calandrelli – producer, arranger, conductor
  - Jay Landers – producer
  - Richard Jay-Alexander – producer
  - Al Schmitt – recording engineer, mixing engineer
  - Randy Waldman – piano
  - David Boruff – saxophone
  - Dean Parks – guitar
  - Chuck Domanico – bass
  - John Robinson – drums
  - Leo Daignault – Forever Plaid
  - David Engel – Forever Plaid
  - Jason Graae – Forever Plaid
  - Michael Winther – Forever Plaid
3. "Loving You" from Passion (Stephen Sondheim) – 4:38
  - Jonathan Tunick – producer, arranger, conductor
  - Jay Landers – producer
  - Richard Jay-Alexander – producer
  - Frank Wolf – recording engineer, mixing engineer
4. "They Live in You" from The Lion King (Lebo M, Mark Mancina, Jay Rifkin) – 4:13
  - Randy Waldman – producer, arranger, recording engineer; keyboards and programming
  - Jay Landers – producer
  - Richard Jay-Alexander – producer
  - Lebo M – coproducer; choir arranger and conductor
  - Kevin Clark – recording engineer
  - Ray Bardini – recording engineer
  - Frank Wolf – mixing engineer
  - Neil Stubenhaus – bass
  - Nandi Morake – choir
  - Ntombikhona Dlamini – choir
  - Lindiwe Dlamini – choir
  - Lindiwe Hlengwa– choir
  - Bonginkosi Kulu – choir
  - Ronald Kunene– choir
  - Anthony Manough – choir
  - Philip McAdoo – choir
  - Rema Webb – choir
5. "Bring Him Home" from Les Misérables (Alain Boublil, Herbert Kretzmer, Claude-Michel Schönberg) – 3:23
  - William Ross – producer, arranger, conductor
  - Jay Landers – producer
  - Richard Jay-Alexander – producer
  - Frank Wolf – recording engineer, mixing engineer
6. Medley (featuring Betty Buckley) – 5:45
  a. "Children Will Listen" from Into the Woods (Stephen Sondheim)
  b. "Our Children" from Ragtime (Lynn Ahrens, Stephen Flaherty)
  - William Ross – producer, arranger, conductor
  - Jay Landers – producer
  - Richard Jay-Alexander – producer
  - Frank Wolf – recording engineer
  - Al Schmitt – mixing engineer
7. "All I Ask of You" from The Phantom of the Opera (Charles Hart, Andrew Lloyd Webber, Richard Stilgoe) – 4:15
  - William Ross – producer, arranger, conductor
  - Jay Landers – producer
  - Richard Jay-Alexander – producer
  - Frank Wolf – recording engineer
  - Al Schmitt – mixing engineer
8. "Once Upon a Dream" from Jekyll & Hyde (Leslie Bricusse, Steve Cuden, Frank Wildhorn) – 5:10
  - Jay Landers – producer
  - Richard Jay-Alexander – producer
  - Megan Cavallari – arranger
  - Frank Wolf – recording engineer, mixing engineer
  - William Ross – conductor
9. "Seasons of Love" from Rent (featuring Nell Carter) (Jonathan Larson) – 4:08
  - Randy Waldman – producer, arranger, recording engineer; keyboards and programming
  - Jay Landers – producer
  - Richard Jay-Alexander – producer
  - Megan Cavallari – choir arranger and conductor
  - Kevin Clark – recording engineer
  - Frank Wolf – mixing engineer
  - Nathan East – bass
  - Maxine Waters – choir
  - Julia Waters – choir
  - Oren Waters – choir
  - Luther Waters – choir
  - Sally Stevens – choir
  - Terry Wood – choir
  - Bobbi Page – choir
  - Carmen Twillie – choir
  - Angie Jaree – choir
  - Ginger Freers – choir
  - Susan Boyd – choir
  - Jeffrey Polk – choir
  - Jim Gilstrap – choir
  - Rick Logan – choir
  - Josef Powell – choir
  - Jon Joyce – choir

== Personnel ==
From the liner notes for the original album:

- Johnny Mathis – vocals
- Jay Landers – executive producer
- Richard Jay-Alexander – executive producer
- Robbie Buchanan – additional vocal production
- Bill Smith – associate producer and engineering
- Martie Kolbl – production coordinator
- Patti Zimmitti – orchestra contractor
- Debbi Datz-Pyle – orchestra contractor
- Jo Ann Kane – music preparation
- Matt Della Polla – scoring coordinator for William Ross
- Lenny LaCroix – rehearsal pianist
- Charlie Paakkari – assistant engineer
- John Sorensen – assistant engineer
- John Hendrickson – assistant engineer
- James McCrone – assistant engineer
- Alan Sanderson – assistant engineer
- Jenny Knotts – assistant engineer
- Doug Sax – mastering
- Laura Grover – liner notes editor
- Peter Fletcher – product manager
- Bob Semanovich – product manager
- Christine Wilson – art direction
- David Vance – photography
- Mastered at The Mastering Lab, Hollywood, California
