= Isn't It Romantic =

Isn't It Romantic may refer to:

- "Isn't It Romantic?", a 1932 song by Rodgers and Hart
- Isn't It Romantic? (1948 film), a musical starring Veronica Lake and Billy De Wolfe
- Isn't It Romantic (2019 film), a parody romantic comedy starring Rebel Wilson
- Isn't It Romantic: The Standards Album, a 2005 album by Johnny Matthis
- Isn't It Romantic?, a 2006 album by Sharon Cuneta
- "Isn't It Romantic?" (The Golden Girls), a 1986 television episode
- "Isn't It Romantic?" (Roseanne), a 1994 television episode
- Isn't It Romantic (play), by Wendy Wasserstein
