= Right from the Heart =

Right From The Heart

Studio album by Johnny Mathis
- Released: March 18, 1985
- Recorded: June 1984–February 1985
- Studio: The Complex, Los Angeles, California, Conway Studios, Hollywood, California, Sunset Sound Studios, Hollywood, California
- Genre: Vocal; pop/rock; R&B
- Length: 36:37
- Label: Columbia
- Producer: Denny Diante

Johnny Mathis chronology
Live (1984)	Right From The Heart (1985)	16 Most Requested Songs (1986)

Right from the Heart is an album by the American pop singer Johnny Mathis that was released on March 18, 1985, by Columbia Records. It was his first album without songs that were previously recorded by other artists. The title track is one of the album's four ballads that, along with four of the remaining six up-tempo tracks, delve into the subject of relationships, but it is the synth-driven "Step by Step" and the anthemic "Hold On" on which Mathis take a break from the usual focus on love songs. The former offers the hope that can be found in change that comes gradually until "I can see the way free from yesterday to a new beginning". The latter stresses the importance of being oneself: "Life is a party. Why don't you come the way you are?"

Even though the title track was used on the ABC soap opera Ryan's Hope, the album did not make it onto Billboard magazine's Top Pop Albums chart. The song "Right from the Heart" did reach number 38 during its two weeks on the magazine's list of the 40 Hot Adult Contemporary songs of the week in the US in May that year.

== Ryan's Hope cameos ==
In 1985, Mathis guest starred on the daytime drama Ryan's Hope in the April 9 and May 1 episodes, the latter of which included a performance of the song "Right from the Heart". In the plot of the show, Dave Greenberg (Scott Holmes) has written the song, and Katie Ryan Thompson (Julia Campbell) "takes the song to Mathis in the hope he'll record it". Mathis lip syncs to his recording of the song as he pretends to be recording the song in a recording studio while the characters look on from the control room.

People magazine gave the album a mixed review, noting the up-tempo songs, "such as "Touch by Touch", on which Mathis forces it a little". Lamenting the lack of duets, the reviewer wrote that "he has had such success doing them", and this is his first studio album since 1977 that has not included one. The reviewer does praise the title track as "vintage Mathis" and asserts that "there's still nobody better when it comes to creating a warm, relaxed, mellow mood". The Encyclopedia of Popular Music gave the album three stars.

== Track listing ==
From the liner notes for the original album:

1. "Touch by Touch" (Brent Mason, Keith Stegall) – 4:21

- Robbie Buchanan – acoustic piano and synthesizers
- Michel Colombier – Fender Rhodes, DX7
- Paul Jackson, Jr. – guitar
- Edie Lehmann – background vocals
- Kate Markowitz – background vocals
- Phil Perry – background vocals

- John Robinson – drums
- Tom Scott – saxophone
- Neil Stubenhaus – bass
- Ernie Watts – saxophone
- Larry Williams – saxophone

2. "Love Shock" (Michel Colombier, Denny Diante, Kathy Wakefield) – 4:19

- Robbie Buchanan – acoustic piano and synthesizers
- Michel Colombier – Fender Rhodes, DX7, DMX Drum Machine
- Siedah Garrett – background vocals
- Dann Huff – lead guitar

- Phillip Ingram – background vocals
- Edie Lehmann – background vocals
- John Robinson – Simmons Drums
- David Williams – rhythm guitar

3. "Just One Touch" (Robbie Buchanan, Diane Warren) – 4:02

- Robbie Buchanan – keyboards and synthesizers
- Paul Jackson, Jr. – guitar
- Edie Lehmann – background vocals

- Kate Markowitz – background vocals
- Phil Perry – background vocals
- John Robinson – drums

4. "Hooked on Goodbye" (Colombier, Diante, Wakefield) – 4:02

- Robbie Buchanan – synthesizers; synthesizer programming
- Michel Colombier – Fender Rhodes, DX7
- Paulinho da Costa – percussion
- Phillip Ingram – harmony vocals; background vocals
- Paul Jackson, Jr. – guitar
- Edie Lehmann – background vocals
- Phil Perry – background vocals

- Darryl Phinnessee – background vocals
- John Robinson – drums
- Tom Scott – saxophone
- Neil Stubenhaus – bass
- Ernie Watts – saxophone
- Larry Williams – saxophone

5. "I Need You (The Journey)" (Colombier, Wakefield) – 5:09

- Michel Colombier – Fender Rhodes, Jupiter 8
- Lynn Davis – female vocalist
- Randy Kerber – acoustic piano

- John Robinson – drums
- Neil Stubenhaus – bass

6. "Step by Step" (Brian Fairweather, Wakefield) – 4:34

- Robbie Buchanan – synthesizers; synthesizer programming
- Paulinho da Costa – percussion
- Brian Fairweather – lead guitar, synthesizers, background vocals
- Dann Huff – guitar

- Phillip Ingram – harmony vocals; background vocals
- Paul Jackson, Jr. – guitar
- Jeff Lorber – bass synthesizer, DX7, Prophet, Mini Moog
- John Robinson – drums

7. "Right from the Heart" from Ryan's Hope (Earl Rose, Wakefield) – 4:25

- Michel Colombier – DX7, Juno
- Dann Huff – guitar
- Phillip Ingram – harmony vocals

- Jeff Lorber – DX7, Juno, Mini Moog
- John Robinson – drums
- Neil Stubenhaus – bass

8. "Falling in Love" (Douglas Getschal, John Robinson) – 4:28

- Paulinho da Costa – percussion
- Douglas Getschal – synthesizer and bass programming
- Phillip Ingram – background vocals
- Paul Jackson, Jr. – guitar

- Edie Lehmann – background vocals
- Phil Perry – background vocals
- Darryl Phinnessee – background vocals
- John Robinson – drums; synthesizer and bass programming

9. "Here We Go Again" (Dave DeLuca, Marvin Morrow) – 4:04

- Robbie Buchanan – keyboards and synthesizers
- Michel Colombier – keyboards and synthesizers
- Paul Jackson, Jr. – guitar
- Edie Lehmann – background vocals

- Kate Markowitz – background vocals
- Phil Perry – background vocals
- John Robinson – drums
- Neil Stubenhaus – bass

10. "Hold On" (Colombier, Diante, Wakefield) – 4:31

- Wayne Anthony – harmony vocals
- Seline Armbeck – background singer
- Teri Armbeck – background singer
- Ron Bergan – background singer
- Buster Brafford – background singer
- Toni Brafford – background singer
- Darrell Brown – background singer
- Robbie Buchanan – synthesizers; synthesizer programming
- Jeff Clarke – background singer
- Judy Clarke – background singer
- Tammy Clarke – background singer
- Michel Colombier – Fender Rhodes
- Paulinho da Costa – percussion
- Jim Ganduglia – background singer
- Dann Huff – guitar
- Phillip Ingram – background singer
- Paul Jackson, Jr. – guitar

- Edie Lehmann – background singer
- Clem Mathis – background singer
- The McGettricks – background singers
- Phil Perry – background singer
- Darryl Phinnessee – background singer
- Gil Reigers – background singer
- Mike Reigers – background singer
- John Robinson – drums
- Tom Scott – saxophone
- Maxine Sibley – background singer
- Neil Stubenhaus – bass
- Dana Tehen – background singer
- Don Watson – background singer
- Ernie Watts – saxophone
- Larry Williams – saxophone
- Charles Zacharie – background singer

== Recording dates ==
From the liner notes for The Voice of Romance: The Columbia Original Album Collection:

- June 29, 1984 – "Hold On", "Touch by Touch"
- July 19, 1984 – "Here We Go Again"
- July 27, 1984 – "Falling in Love", "Hooked on Goodbye"
- August 14, 1984 – "Just One Touch"
- October 24, 1984 – "I Need You (The Journey)"
- December 6, 1984 – "Step by Step"
- January 3, 1985 – "Love Shock"
- February 8, 1985 – "Right from the Heart"

== Personnel ==
From the liner notes for the original album:

- Johnny Mathis – vocals
- Denny Diante – producer
- Michel Colombier – arranger (except as noted)
- Robbie Buchanan – arranger ("Just One Touch")
- Brian Fairweather – arranger ("Step by Step")
- Douglas Getschal – arranger ("Falling in Love")
- John Robinson – arranger ("Falling in Love")
- Mick Guzauski – recording engineer, mixing engineer
- Bernie Grundman – mastering engineer
- Jules Chaikin – string and horn contractor
- Sidney Weiss – concertmaster
- Jo-Anne McGettrick – production coordinator
- Mikey & Friends – wardrobe
- David Vance – photographer
- Mastered at Bernie Grundman Mastering, Hollywood, California
- Mixed at Conway Studios, Hollywood, California, using the GML Automation System
- Peter Chaikin – additional engineer
- Ed Cherney – additional engineer
- Larry Hirsch – additional engineer
- Peggy McCreary – additional engineer
- Jeremy Smith – additional engineer
- Frank Wolf – additional engineer
- Erik Zobler – additional engineer
- Terry Christian – second engineer
- Rick Clifford – second engineer
- Bill Jackson – second engineer
- Richard McKernan (Conway Studios) – second engineer
- Sharon Rice (The Complex) – second engineer
- Steve Shelton (Sunset Sound Studios) – second engineer

== Bibliography ==
- Peterson, BetteLou (April 8, 1985), "Johnny Mathis guests on Ryan's Hope", The Montréal Gazette, pp. B10
- Whitburn, Joel (2007), Joel Whitburn Presents Billboard Top Adult Songs, 1961-2006, Record Research Inc., ISBN 978-0898201697
