= How Do You Keep the Music Playing? (Johnny Mathis album) =

Studio album by Johnny Mathis
- Released: May 4, 1993
- Recorded: October 1992–February 1993
- Studio: Andora (Hollywood); Capitol (Hollywood); Right Track (New York); Signet Sound (Los Angeles); 20th Century Fox (Los Angeles)
- Genre: Vocal
- Length: 46:56
- Label: Columbia
- Producer: Alan and Marilyn Bergman; Jay Landers; Michel Legrand

Johnny Mathis chronology
Better Together: The Duet Album (1991)	How Do You Keep the Music Playing? (1993)	The Christmas Music of Johnny Mathis: A Personal Collection (1993)

Professional ratings
Review scores
Source	Rating
Allmusic	3/5 stars
The Encyclopedia of Popular Music	3/5 stars

How Do You Keep the Music Playing? is an album by American pop singer Johnny Mathis that was released on May 4, 1993, by Columbia Records and included the subtitle The Songs of Michel Legrand and Alan & Marilyn Bergman on its cover. The album featured new, individual recordings of two songs that Mathis covered as a medley for his 1973 album Me and Mrs. Jones -- "I Was Born in Love with You" and "Summer Me, Winter Me". He also performed new arrangements of "The Windmills of Your Mind", "What Are You Doing the Rest of Your Life?", and "The Summer Knows", which he had recorded for other albums many years earlier.

== Liner notes ==
Mathis conveyed his appreciation of Legrand's music in the liner notes for the album, describing him as "the consummate composer. His arrangements are endlessly inventive and deeply passionate." His appreciation was equally enthusiastic for the Bergman's lyrics: "They express the desires of romance with a rare sophistication. It's been a delight to sing these beautiful creations."

The Bergmans also expressed their love of Legrand: "We always feel as if there are words on the lips of his notes just waiting to be written." And they were especially exuberant in their praise of Mathis: "His voice dims the lights and makes all within the sound of it feel as though he's singing just to them. The mood he creates is one of intimacy, warmth and sensitivity. And it's a voice that keeps getting better—wiser, more knowing, more moving."

== Reception ==
Nick Catalano mentioned the album in his review of a Mathis concert in New York City. "The present album and Carnegie concerts celebrate the music of Alan and Marilyn Bergman, with arrangements by Michel Legrand. On the album, the attempt to balance the elements succeeds mightily."

== Track listing ==
All of the songs on the album feature music by Michel Legrand and lyrics by Alan and Marilyn Bergman.

1. "How Do You Keep the Music Playing?" from Best Friends (Introduction) – 1:26
2. "The Summer Knows" from Summer of '42 – 4:19
3. "Something New in My Life" from Micki & Maude – 4:10
4. "What Are You Doing the Rest of Your Life?" from The Happy Ending – 5:58
5. "The Way She Makes Me Feel" from Yentl – 4:01
6. "I Was Born in Love with You" from Wuthering Heights (1970) – 4:45
7. "On My Way to You" – 5:01
8. "After the Rain" – 4:08
9. "The Windmills of Your Mind" from The Thomas Crown Affair – 4:30
10. "Summer Me, Winter Me" – 3:38
11. "How Do You Keep the Music Playing?" from Best Friends – 4:42

== Personnel ==
From the liner notes for the original album:

Performers

- Johnny Mathis – vocals
- Michel Legrand – grand piano, arrangements and conductor
- Michael Lang – grand piano
- Dennis Budimir – guitars
- Tom Rizzo – guitars
- Chuck Domanico – bass
- Dave Stone – bass
- Ray Brinker – drums
- Gary Foster – alto saxophone, alto sax solo (4)
- Arturo Sandoval – trumpet solo (2)

Production

- Alan and Marilyn Bergman – producers
- Jay Landers – producer
- Michel Legrand – producer
- Maurice Cevrero – music preparation
- JoAnn Kane – music preparation
- Ken Watson – orchestra manager
- Frank Wolf – orchestra recording
- Jeremy Smith – vocal recording
- Joel Moss – mixing, additional recording
- Malcolm Pollack – additional recording
- Ray Blair – assistant engineer
- John Bruno – assistant engineer
- Bino Espinoza – assistant engineer
- Brandon Harris – assistant engineer
- Jen Monnar – assistant engineer
- Charlie Paakkari – assistant engineer
- Mike Corbett – segue editing
- Bernie Grundman – mastering at Bernie Grundman Mastering (Hollywood, California)
- Marsha Burns – project coordinator
- Jim DiGiovanni – assistant project coordinator
- Diego Uchitel – photography
- Dan McKay – hair, make-up

== Bibliography ==
- Catalano, Nick (2009), New York Nights: Writing, Producing and Performing in Gotham, iUniverse, Inc., ISBN 978-0-595-48596-3
