= The Secret of Christmas =

1959 song by Sammy Cahn and Jimmy Van Heusen

Single by Bing Crosby

from the album Say One for Me
- A-side: "Just What I Wanted for Christmas"
- Released: 1959
- Genre: Christmas traditional pop
- Length: 2:52
- Label: Columbia
- Songwriters: Sammy Cahn and Jimmy Van Heusen

"The Secret of Christmas" is a popular Christmas song written by Sammy Cahn and Jimmy Van Heusen for the 1959 film Say One for Me. In the film, the song is performed first by Ray Walston, and then by Bing Crosby accompanied by Debbie Reynolds and Robert Wagner with orchestra conducted by Lionel Newman.

The soundtrack album by Columbia Records did not include the version from the film, but a solo recording Crosby made with Frank De Vol and his Orchestra. Columbia also released the recording as a single that year, the B-side to "Just What I Wanted for Christmas" (Columbia 4-41496). Crosby recorded the song again in 1964 with Fred Waring and the Pennsylvanians for the Reprise Records album 12 Songs of Christmas. This version also saw a single release as the B-side to "The White World of Winter" (Reprise 0424).

The song has also been recorded by other artists. Contemporary recordings include:

- Ella Fitzgerald for a non-album single b/w "The Christmas Song" (1959) (Verve V-10186)
- Johnny Mathis for his album Sounds of Christmas (1963)
- Julie Andrews for the compilation Christmas Greetings: Volume 4 (1973)

More recent covers include:

- Shirley Horn for a non-album single b/w "What Are You Doing New Year's Eve" (1991) (Verve Xmas-2)
- Susannah McCorkle for the compilation A Concord Jazz Christmas (1994)
- The Nylons for their album Harmony: The Christmas Songs (1994)
- Captain & Tennille for their album The Secret of Christmas (2007)
- Marie Osmond for her album Magic of Christmas (2007)
- Ashley Brown for her EP The Secret of Christmas (2018)
