= Say One for Me (album) =

1959 soundtrack album

Say One for Me: An Original Sound Track Recording

Soundtrack album by Bing Crosby
- Released: 1959
- Genre: Soundtrack, vocal
- Label: Columbia

Bing Crosby chronology
Bing's Buddies and Beaus (1959)	Say One for Me: An Original Sound Track Recording (1959)	How the West Was Won (w/ Rosemary Clooney) (1960)

Say One for Me is a soundtrack album issued by Columbia Records (CL 1337) in 1959 from the film of the same name. The film starred Bing Crosby, Debbie Reynolds, Robert Wagner, and Ray Walston. Lionel Newman conducted the musical backing for the film and was nominated for an Oscar for "Best Scoring of a Musical Picture" at the 32nd Academy Awards. The songs were written by Jimmy Van Heusen (music) and Sammy Cahn (lyrics).

The version of "The Secret of Christmas" included on the album was not the one used in the film. The soundtrack version had Robert Wagner and Debbie Reynolds joining Bing for a few lines. Instead, Bing recorded the song again on March 25, 1959, with Frank De Vol and his Orchestra.

The entire album was included in the Sepia Records CD The Road to Hong Kong / Say One for Me (Sepia 1216) issued in February 2013.

== Reception ==
The film itself was not very well received and neither was the album. The British publication The Gramophone commenting, "Say One for Me is abysmal. Even Bing Crosby can’t get away with numbers like ‘The Secret of Christmas' and it sounds as if he’s not really trying to on this occasion. The rest is substandard rock ‘n’ roll, a couple of mildewed ballads and the inevitable cha-cha for Debbie Reynolds and Robert Wagner."

== Track listing ==
Side one
No.	Title	Performed by	Length
1.	"Say One for Me" (main title)	Lionel Newman & Orchestra	1:55
2.	"Say One for Me"	Bing Crosby & Debbie Reynolds	3:07
3.	"Say One for Me"	Lionel Newman & Orchestra	0:52
4.	"You Can't Love 'Em All"	Debbie Reynolds & Robert Wagner	4:17
5.	"Say One for Me" (orchestral reprise)	Lionel Newman & Orchestra	1:33
6.	"The Girl Most Likely to Succeed"	Debbie Reynolds & Robert Wagner	3:44
7.	"You Can't Love 'Em All" (orchestral reprise)	Lionel Newman & Orchestra	1:17

Side two
No.	Title	Performed by	Length
1.	"The Night That Rock and Roll Died (Almost)"	Lionel Newman & Orchestra	1:56
2.	"I Couldn't Care Less"	Bing Crosby, accompanied by Buddy Cole	1:50
3.	"I Couldn't Care Less" (hangover scene)	Lionel Newman & Orchestra	1:53
4.	"The Night That Rock and Roll Died (Almost)"	Judy Harriett (dubbed by Rosemary June)	3:21
5.	"Say One for Me"	Bing Crosby	1:55
6.	"Chico's Choo-Choo"	Debbie Reynolds & Robert Wagner	3:12
7.	"The Secret of Christmas"	Bing Crosby	2:52
