= 16 Most Requested Songs (Johnny Mathis album) =

Compilation album by Johnny Mathis
- Released: July 11, 1986
- Recorded: 1956–1962; 1969–1977
- Genre: Vocal; R&B; stage & screen; pop/rock
- Length: 47:40
- Label: Columbia

Johnny Mathis chronology
Right from the Heart (1985)	16 Most Requested Songs (1986)	Christmas Eve with Johnny Mathis (1986)

Professional ratings
Review scores
Source	Rating
Allmusic	3/5 stars
The Encyclopedia of Popular Music	4/5 stars

16 Most Requested Songs is a compilation album by American pop singer Johnny Mathis that was released in 1986 by Columbia Records and features 12 tracks representing his time with the label from 1956 to 1963, including his Billboard top 10 hits "Chances Are", "It's Not for Me to Say", "The Twelfth of Never", "Gina", and "What Will Mary Say" as well as his signature song, "Misty". The remaining four selections ("Evergreen (Love Theme from A Star Is Born)", "Love Theme from Romeo and Juliet (A Time for Us)", "(Where Do I Begin) Love Story", and "Didn't We") were recorded with Columbia between 1969 and 1977.

On August 4, 2000, the album received Gold certification from the Recording Industry Association of America for sales of 500,000 copies.

== Reception ==
Stephen Thomas Erlewine of Allmusic retrospectively gave the collection a good review. "Although other sets may have a few more tracks, this is a very entertaining sampler."<allmusic/>

== Track listing ==
1. "Chances Are" (Robert Allen, Al Stillman) – 3:03
  - Mitch Miller - producer
  - Ray Conniff - arranger, conductor
2. "It's Not for Me to Say" (Robert Allen, Al Stillman) – 3:05
  - Al Ham, Mitch Miller - producers
  - Ray Conniff - arranger, conductor
3. "Misty" (Johnny Burke, Erroll Garner) – 3:34
  - Al Ham, Mitch Miller - producers
  - Glenn Osser - arranger, conductor
4. "Wild Is the Wind" (Dimitri Tiomkin, Ned Washington) – 2:26
  - Al Ham, Mitch Miller - producers
  - Ray Ellis - arranger, conductor
5. "Wonderful! Wonderful!" (Sherman Edwards, Ben Raleigh) – 2:50
  - Al Ham, Mitch Miller - producers
  - Ray Conniff - arranger, conductor
6. "Maria" (Leonard Bernstein, Stephen Sondheim) – 3:45
  - Mitch Miller - producer
  - Glenn Osser - arranger, conductor
7. "The Twelfth of Never" (Jerry Livingston, Paul Francis Webster) – 2:28
  - Mitch Miller - producer
  - Ray Conniff - arranger, conductor
8. "Small World" (Stephen Sondheim, Jule Styne) – 3:18
  - Mitch Miller - producer
  - Glenn Osser - arranger, conductor
9. "Evergreen (Love Theme from A Star Is Born)" (Barbra Streisand, Paul Williams) – 3:15
  - Jack Gold - producer
  - Gene Page - arranger, conductor
10. "Love Theme from Romeo and Juliet (A Time for Us)" (Larry Kusik, Nino Rota, Eddie Snyder) – 2:58
  - Jack Gold - producer
  - Ernie Freeman - arranger, conductor
11. "What Will Mary Say" (Eddie Snyder, Paul Vance) – 3:09
  - Ernie Altschuler - producer
  - Don Costa - arranger, conductor
12. "When Sunny Gets Blue" (Marvin Fisher, Jack Segal) – 2:41
  - Al Ham, Mitch Miller - producers
  - Ray Conniff - arranger, conductor
13. "A Certain Smile" (Sammy Fain, Paul Francis Webster) – 2:47
  - Al Ham, Mitch Miller - producers
  - Ray Ellis - arranger, conductor
14. "(Where Do I Begin) Love Story" (Francis Lai, Carl Sigman) – 2:46
  - Jack Gold - producer
  - Perry Botkin Jr. - arranger, conductor
15. "Didn't We" (Jimmy Webb) – 2:49
  - Jack Gold - producer
  - Ernie Freeman - arranger, conductor
16. "Gina" (Leon Carr, Paul Vance) – 2:46
  - Ernie Altschuler - producer
  - Don Costa - arranger, conductor

== Personnel ==
- Johnny Mathis – vocals
- Mike Berniker – preparation and remastering
- Tim Geelan – engineering, preparation and remastering
- Nancy Stahl – artwork
- Howard Garwood – liner notes
- Digitally mastered at CBS, New York

== Bibliography ==
- Whitburn, Joel (2009), Joel Whitburn's Top Pop Singles, 1955-2008, Record Research Inc., ISBN 0898201802
