= How the West Was Won (Bing Crosby album) =

1960 Bing Crosby album

Studio album by Bing Crosby, Rosemary Clooney
- Released: 1960
- Recorded: July 1959
- Length: 1:23:15
- Label: RCA Victor
- Producer: Simon Rady

Bing Crosby, Rosemary Clooney chronology
Say One for Me (w/ Debbie Reynolds and Robert Wagner) (1959)	How the West Was Won (1960)	Join Bing and Sing Along (1960)

How the West Was Won was a 2-LP album recorded in July 1959 at United Recorders, Hollywood, for Bing Crosby's own company, Project Records. It was released by RCA Victor in 1960 and featured Crosby, Rosemary Clooney as well as other singers. The backing orchestra was conducted by Bob Thompson.

The records were issued with automatic couplings, i.e. LOP 6070-1 - sides 1 and 3, LOP 6070-2 - sides 2 and 4.

== Reception ==
Billboard liked the album, saying "This handsome set is sure to attract. The striking cover and informative booklet are perfect complements to the fine album contents which are interpreted by a stellar line-up of artists. The two-disk set offers a heap of Americana in narrated form. Strongest potential."

== Track listing ==
Side one
No.	Z	Song Title	Performer(s)	Writer(s)	Time
Exploring the Wild New Land
1.		"Shenandoah"	Chorus & orchestra	Traditional	0:45
2.		"Extract from Carl Sandburg"	Bing Crosby	Carl Sandburg	0:50
3.		"Bound for the Promised Land"	Bing Crosby & Rosemary Clooney	Traditional	1:34
4.		"En Roulant Ma Boule Roulant"	Bing Crosby & Jack Halloran Singers	Traditional	1:10
5.		"Lupita Divina"	Bing Crosby & The Tarrytown Trio	Traditional	2:00
6.		"The Sioux Indians"	Sam Hinton	Traditional	1:36
7.		"Extract from Carl Sandburg" / "Shenandoah"	Bing Crosby	Carl Sandburg	1:54
Travellers of the Great Plains
8.		"Crossing the Plains"	Bing Crosby & Rosemary Clooney	John A. Stone	2:23
9.		"Buffalo Boy"	Sam Hinton	Traditional	1:38
10.		"Sweet Betsy from Pike"	Rosemary Clooney	John A. Stone	1:53
11.		"Ox Driving Song"	Jimmie Driftwood	Traditional	1:45
12.		"Will You Go Out West with Me	Sam Hinton	Traditional	1:35
Side two
No.	Z	Song Title	Performer(s)	Writer(s)	Time
Ranchers and Indian Raiders
1.		"Buffalo Gals"	Bing Crosby & Rosemary Clooney	John Hodges	1:47
2.		"General Custer"	Jimmie Driftwood	Traditional	1:52
3.		"All 'Pewtrified'" (narration)	Bing Crosby	Traditional	1:39
4.		"Will You Come to the Bower"	Bing Crosby	Traditional	2:02
5.		"Bile Them Cabbage Down"	Sam Hinton	Traditional	1:25
6.		"Green Grow the Lilacs"	Bing Crosby & Rosemary Clooney	Traditional	2:54
The Great Gold Rush Days
7.		"A Ripping Trip"	Sam Hinton	Traditional	1:31
8.		"What Was Your Name in the States"	Jimmie Driftwood	Traditional	1:31
9.		"California Ball"	Rosemary Clooney	Traditional	2:10
10.		"When I Went Off to Prospect"	Bing Crosby	John A. Stone	1:44
11.		"Lane County Bachelor"	Sam Hinton	Frank Baker	1:34
12.		"Old Settler's Song (Acres of Clams)"	Bing Crosby	Francis D. Henry	2:46
Side three
No.	Z	Song Title	Performer(s)	Writer(s)	Time
The Railroads
1.		"Drill, Ye Tarriers, Drill"	Jack Halloran Singers	Thomas Casey, Charles Connolly	1:26
2.		"A Railroader's Bride I'll Be"	Rosemary Clooney	Traditional	1:44
3.		"Nine Hundred Miles"	Bing Crosby	Traditional	2:03
Desperadoes
4.		"Billy the Kid"	Jimmie Driftwood	Traditional	1:44
5.		"Hang Me, Oh Hang Me!"	Bing Crosby	Traditional	2:58
6.		"Jesse James"	Jimmie Driftwood	Traditional	1:55
Settlers and Civilization
7.		"Skip to My Lou"	Bing Crosby & Rosemary Clooney	Traditional	1:30
8.		"Crawdad Song"	The Tarrytown Trio	Traditional	1:31
9.		"Careless Love"	Rosemary Clooney	Traditional	1:45
10.		"Hell in Texas"	Sam Hinton	Traditional	2:26
11.		"Jennie Jenkins"	Bing Crosby & Rosemary Clooney	Traditional	1:53
Side four
No.	Z	Song Title	Performer(s)	Writer(s)	Time
Cowboys - The Last Frontiersmen
1.		"Streets of Laredo"	Bing Crosby	Frank H. Maynard	2:54
2.		"Down by the Brazos"	Sam Hinton	Traditional	2:05
3.		"Git Along, Little Dogies"	Bing Crosby	Traditional	2:19
4.		"Buckskin Joe"	Bing Crosby	Jimmie Driftwood	2:06
5.		"Red River Valley"	Bing Crosby	Traditional	2:06
The Mormons
6.		"The Handcart Song"	The Deseret Mormon Choir	John D. T. McAllister	2:06
7.		"The Spirit of God Like a Fire Is Burning"	The Deseret Mormon Choir	W. W. Phelps	2:29
8.		"Come, Come, Ye Saints"	The Salt Lake Mormon Tabernacle Choir	William Clayton	4:17

== CD ==
Bing's songs from the album were released on CD as Lillis, Love and a Little Covered Wagon (catalog number HLVCD-004).
In 2007 the complete album was re-released on CD by Bear Family Records (BCD-16634-AR).
