= The Very Best of Johnny Mathis =

Compilation album by Johnny Mathis
- Released: March 21, 2006
- Recorded: 1956–1998
- Genre: Vocal; R&B; stage & screen; pop/rock
- Length: 1:12:11
- Label: Sony BMG

Johnny Mathis chronology
Isn't It Romantic: The Standards Album (2005)	The Very Best of Johnny Mathis (2006)	Gold: A 50th Anniversary Christmas Celebration (2006)

The Very Best of Johnny Mathis is a compilation album by American pop singer Johnny Mathis that was released in the UK in 2006 by Sony BMG and peaked at number six on the UK albums chart that same year. This collection has nine of his 17 UK singles chart entries, including his number-one solo version of "When a Child Is Born" and his number-three duet with Deniece Williams, "Too Much, Too Little, Too Late".

== Track listing ==
1. "Too Much, Too Little, Too Late" performed with Deniece Williams (Nat Kipner, John Vallins) – 2:59
2. "A Certain Smile" (Sammy Fain, Paul Francis Webster) – 2:47
3. "I'm Stone in Love with You" (Anthony Bell, Thom Bell, Linda Creed) – 3:30
4. "Misty" (Johnny Burke, Erroll Garner) – 3:34
5. "Gone, Gone, Gone" (L. Russell Brown, Lisa Hayward) – 3:32
6. "Chances Are" (Robert Allen, Al Stillman) – 3:03
7. "It's Not for Me to Say" (Robert Allen, Al Stillman) – 3:05
8. "Friends in Love" performed with Dionne Warwick (Bill Champlin, David Foster, Jay Graydon) – 4:03
9. "Maria" (Leonard Bernstein, Stephen Sondheim) – 3:45
10. "My Love for You" (Abner Silver, Sid Wayne) – 3:07
11. "On a Clear Day (You Can See Forever)" (Burton Lane, Alan Jay Lerner) – 2:49
12. "Prelude to a Kiss" (Duke Ellington, Irving Gordon, Irving Mills) – 2:52
13. "The Twelfth of Never" (Jerry Livingston, Paul Francis Webster) – 2:28
14. "Wild Is the Wind" (Dimitri Tiomkin, Ned Washington) – 2:26
15. "Un-Break My Heart" (Diane Warren) – 5:00
16. "You're All I Need to Get By" performed with Deniece Williams (Nickolas Ashford, Valerie Simpson) - 2:40
17. "Someone" (William J. Tennyson, Jr.) – 2:58
18. "When a Child Is Born" (Ciro Dammicco, Fred Jay) – 3:41
19. "Feelings" (Morris Albert, Loulou Gasté) – 3:28
20. "Fly Me to the Moon (In Other Words)" (Bart Howard) – 3:51
21. "The Look of Love" (Burt Bacharach, Hal David) – 3:45
22. "(Where Do I Begin) Love Story" (Francis Lai, Carl Sigman) – 2:46

== Personnel ==
- Johnny Mathis – vocals
