= Give Me Your Love for Christmas =

Studio album by Johnny Mathis
- Released: October 13, 1969
- Recorded: July 15, 1969; September 23, 1969
- Genre: Christmas
- Length: 30:11
- Label: Columbia
- Producer: Jack Gold

Johnny Mathis chronology
Love Theme from "Romeo And Juliet" (A Time for Us) (1969)	Give Me Your Love for Christmas (1969)	Raindrops Keep Fallin' on My Head (1970)

Give Me Your Love for Christmas is the third Christmas album by American pop singer Johnny Mathis and was released by Columbia Records on October 13, 1969. The oldest song selected for this project was the 1934 classic "Santa Claus Is Coming to Town", which meant there were not the traditional hymns that could be found on his previous Christmas outings. He did, however, cover several other contemporary Christmas favorites along with a few new and lesser-known songs, such as the title track, which was a reworking of an unreleased recording of his from 1961, and "Christmas Day", which came from the then-current Broadway musical Promises, Promises. New versions of "Have Yourself a Merry Little Christmas" and "The Little Drummer Boy", which he also recorded in 1963 for his previous Christmas LP, Sounds of Christmas, made the final track list here as well.

The album debuted on Billboard magazine's Christmas Albums sales chart in the issue dated December 6, 1969, and spent one of its four weeks there at number one. It also appeared on the magazine's seasonal LP chart each year from 1970 to 1973 as well as in 1987 and 1988. On December 26, 1979, it received its first award from the Recording Industry Association of America when it reached the US sales mark of 500,000 copies necessary for Gold status.

On September 1, 2001, the album was released on compact disc for the first time, and two months later, on November 5, it was awarded Platinum certification by the RIAA for sales of one million copies in the US. The tracks from this album were also reissued as part of the 2015 Mathis compilation The Complete Christmas Collection 1958–2010, a 3-CD set on the Real Gone Music label.

== Reception ==
Professional ratings
Review scores
Source	Rating
Allmusic	link
Billboard	positive

Billboard felt that the "Mathis touch is warmly suited to the spirit of the season and the songs cover the Yule holiday appropriately".

== Track listing ==
=== Side one ===
1. "Jingle Bell Rock" (Joseph Carleton Beal, James Ross Boothe) – 2:11
2. "Have Yourself a Merry Little Christmas" from Meet Me in St. Louis (Ralph Blane, Hugh Martin) – 3:29
3. "My Favorite Things" from The Sound of Music (Richard Rodgers, Oscar Hammerstein II)– 2:37
4. "Give Me Your Love for Christmas" (Jack Gold, Phyllis Stohn) – 2:37
5. "Santa Claus Is Coming to Town" (J. Fred Coots, Haven Gillespie) – 2:19
6. "What Are You Doing New Year's Eve?" (Frank Loesser) – 2:52

=== Side two ===
1. "Do You Hear What I Hear?" (Gloria Shayne Baker, Noel Regney) – 3:21
2. "Calypso Noel" (Gordon Krunnfusz) – 2:13
3. "The Little Drummer Boy" (Katherine Davis, Henry Onorati, Harry Simeone) – 2:28
4. "Christmas Day" from Promises, Promises (Burt Bacharach, Hal David) – 3:24
5. "The Lord's Prayer" (Albert Hay Malotte) – 2:40

== Recording dates ==
From the liner notes for The Complete Christmas Collection 1958-2010:

- July 15, 1969 — "Christmas Day", "Do You Hear What I Hear?", "Give Me Your Love for Christmas", "My Favorite Things"
- September 23, 1969 — "Calypso Noel", "Have Yourself a Merry Little Christmas", "Jingle Bell Rock", "The Little Drummer Boy", "The Lord's Prayer", "Santa Claus Is Coming to Town", "What Are You Doing New Year's Eve?"

== Billboard Christmas Albums chart performance ==
Year	Peak position
1969	1
1970	3
1971	5
1972	3
1973	19
1987	19
1988	18

== Personnel ==
- Johnny Mathis – vocals
- Jack Gold – producer
- Ernie Freeman – arranger and conductor
- Phil Macy – engineer
- Ivan Nagy – photography

== Bibliography ==
- Whitburn, Joel (2004), Christmas in the Charts (1920-2004), Record Research Inc., ISBN 0-89820-161-6
- White, Adam (1990), The Billboard Book of Gold & Platinum Records, Watson-Guptill Publications, Inc., ISBN 0-82307-547-8
