= Isn't It Romantic: The Standards Album =

Studio album by Johnny Mathis
- Released: February 1, 2005
- Recorded: 2004
- Studio: O'Henry Sound Studios, Burbank, California, G Studio Digital, Studio City, California, Magelic Studio, Los Angeles, California
- Genre: Vocal; stage & screen
- Length: 39:50
- Label: Columbia
- Producer: Jorge Calandrelli

Johnny Mathis chronology
The Essential Johnny Mathis (2004)	Isn't It Romantic: The Standards Album (2005)	The Very Best of Johnny Mathis (2006)

Professional ratings
Review scores
Source	Rating
Allmusic	3/5 stars
Jazz Times	positive

Isn't It Romantic: The Standards Album is an album by the American pop singer Johnny Mathis that was released on February 1, 2005, by Columbia Records. In an interview that year with NPR's Ed Gordon, the singer describes a conversation he had with record company executives: "They said, 'We want you to sing the most popular songs from the American musical theater that you haven't sung in the past.'... I sat down and finally came up with a list of nine songs that I hadn't recorded that were very familiar to the public."

The tenth song on the album, "Over the Rainbow", is a duet with Ray Charles that originally appeared on the late musician's final release, Genius Loves Company, in 2004 and won the Grammy Award for Best Instrumental Arrangement Accompanying Vocalist(s) for its arranger Victor Vanacore. Mathis received a Grammy nomination for this album in the category of Best Traditional Pop Vocal Album.

== Reception ==
John Bush of AllMusic noted that "singers from a variety of genres had jumped on the standards bandwagon" around this time due in large part to the success that Rod Stewart was having with his series of Great American Songbook albums. "There are a few qualities, however, that separate [Mathis] from the competition. His long mastery of singing love songs is one, and his comprehensive knowledge of the pop canon is another (the last would be, of course, that wonderful voice)." He also wrote, "His choices for the material on Isn't It Romantic are excellent, all of them natural fits for both his voice and his persona."

Christopher Loudon of Jazz Times remarked that Mathis's latest "arrives about six months prior to his 70th birthday and coincides with his career's 50th anniversary. By the time Sinatra started hitting those sorts of touchstones, his vocal magnificence had been reduced to stubble. Not so Mathis. Throughout the 10 tracks assembled here... the once and future makeout king sounds heavenly as ever."

== Track listing ==
1. "Isn't It Romantic?" (Lorenz Hart, Richard Rodgers) – 3:45
2. "Love Is Here to Stay" (George Gershwin, Ira Gershwin) – 4:41
3. "Day by Day" (Sammy Cahn, Axel Stordahl, Paul Weston) – 2:41
4. "Dindi" (Ray Gilbert, Antonio Carlos Jobim, Aloysio de Oliveira) – 4:10
5. "There's a Kind of Hush" (Les Reed, Geoff Stephens) – 4:13
6. "This Can't Be Love" (Lorenz Hart, Richard Rodgers) – 2:53
7. "Cottage for Sale" (Larry Conley, Willard Robison) – 5:15
8. "Almost Like Being in Love" (Alan Jay Lerner, Frederick Loewe) – 3:39
9. "The Rainbow Connection" (Kenny Ascher, Paul Williams) – 3:41
10. "Over the Rainbow" performed with Ray Charles (Harold Arlen, E.Y. Harburg) – 4:52

== Personnel ==
From the liner notes for the original album:

Performers

- Johnny Mathis – vocals
- Mike Lang – piano (except as noted)
- Jorge Calandrelli – piano ("Dindi")
- Dave Carpenter – bass
- Charles Berghofer – bass
- Gregg Field – drums
- Luis Conte – Latin percussion
- Ramón Stagnaro – guitar
- Bruce Dukov – concertmaster
- Robin Olsen – violin
- Julie Gigante – violin
- Michael Markman – violin
- Patricia Johnson – violin
- Natalie Leggett – violin
- Guillermo Romero – violin
- Darius Campo – violin
- Berj Garabedian – violin
- Jacqueline Brand – violin
- Eun-Mee Ahn – violin
- Lily H. Chen – violin
- Phillip Levy – violin
- Tamara Hatwan – violin
- Horia Moroaica – violin
- Katia Popov – viola
- Roland Kato – viola
- Victoria Miskolczy – viola
- Raymond Tisher – viola
- Harry Shirinian – viola
- Samuel Formicola – viola
- Stephen Erdody – cello
- Tim Landauer – cello
- Armen Ksajikian – cello
- Christine Soule – cello
- Gayle Levant – harp
- Joe Stone – oboe
- Warren Luening – trumpet
- Greg Huckins – baritone saxophone
- Tom Scott – alto/tenor saxophone (solos)
- Chauncey Welsch – trombone
- Gary Foster – tenor saxophone
- John Reynolds – French horn
- Brian O'Connor – French horn
- Paul Klintworth – French horn

Production

- Jorge Calandrelli – producer (except as noted), arranger, conductor
- John Burk – producer ("Over the Rainbow")
- Terry Howard – producer ("Over the Rainbow")
- Herbert Waltl – producer ("Over the Rainbow")
- Jay Landers – executive producer
- Edward Blau – executive producer
- Don Murray – recording engineer; mixing engineer (except as noted)
- Al Schmitt – mixing engineer ("Over the Rainbow")
- Gregg Field – additional engineering
- Marco Marinangeli – additional engineering
- Seth Presant – additional engineering
- Vlado Meller – mastering
- Joe Soldo – musicians contractor
- JoAnne Kane – copying service
- Mark Graham – copying service
- Nancy Donald – art direction
- William Claxton – photography
- Mastered at Sony Music Studios, New York, New York
