= My Kind of Christmas (song) =

Song by Johnny Mathis
- Released: November 1961
- Recorded: 1961
- Genre: Easy listening, Christmas music
- Label: Fontana (U.K.); Columbia (U.S.)
- Composer(s): Jerry Livingston
- Lyricist(s): Paul Francis Webster

"My Kind of Christmas" is a 1961 song by Johnny Mathis written by Jerry Livingston with lyrics by Paul Francis Webster. It was released as a standalone Christmas single in November 1961, with the Allyn Ferguson/Syd Shaw composition "Christmas Eve" on the B-side. When Mathis' 1958 Merry Christmas album was re-reissued on CD in 1998 the A- and B-sides of the 1961 single were included as bonus tracks.
