= Richard Jay-Alexander =

American Broadway producer and director (born 1953)

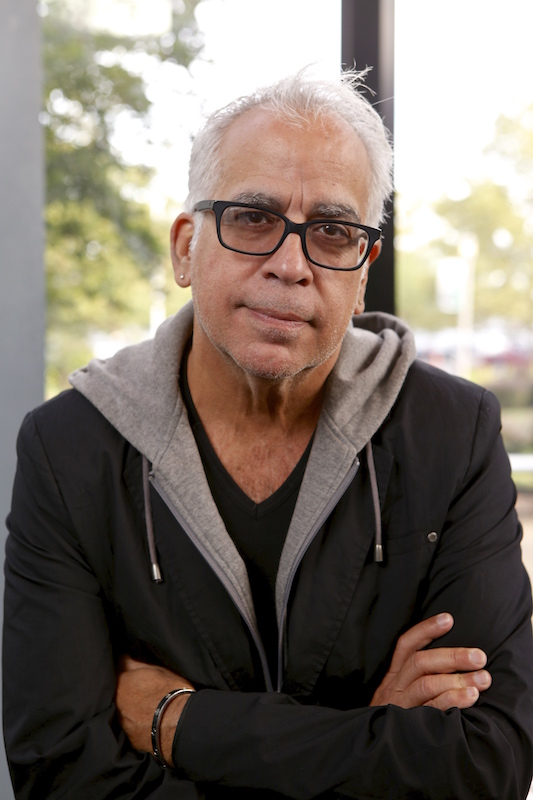
- Born: May 24, 1953 (age 72); Solvay, New York, U.S.
- Education: State University of New York at Oswego – 1974
- Occupations: Broadway producer, director
- Parent(s): Frank and Dulce Fernandez

Richard Jay-Alexander (born May 24, 1953) is an American Broadway producer and director. He served as Executive Director of the North American Flagship Headquarters, Cameron Mackintosh Inc., for twelve years, known for productions which include Les Misérables, Cats, The Phantom of the Opera, Miss Saigon, Five Guys Named Moe, Oliver! and Putting It Together.

Some of his directorial credits include the staging of My Love Letter to Broadway (2016) starring Kristin Chenoweth and For The Girls (2020) also starring Ms. Chenoweth, Porgy and Bess for the South Florida Symphony (2019), the concert versions of Les Miz (2008) and Guys and Dolls (2009), both at the Hollywood Bowl. Also on the New York Stage, he directed Bernadette Peters at the Minskoff in a one night only concert benefitting Broadway Barks and Broadway Cares.

Jay-Alexander is a long time board member of Broadway Cares/Equity Fights AIDS and has directed benefits for the honored organization, as well as other causes he cares about, including animals and no-kill shelters, the Make-A-Wish Foundation of South Florida, The Actor's Fund, National Asian Artists Project (NAAP), Broadway Dreams, and Hollywood's Motion Picture and Television Fund (MPTF).

He is passionate about young talent and teaches workshops and master classes, when possible. He has also served as camp director for Kristin Chenoweth's Broadway Bootcamp.

== Early life and career ==
Richard is one of five children, born to a mother from Havana, Cuba and a father who was Spanish-American. The name change came as a result of someone else having the same name and the unions not allowing multiples.

Jay-Alexander began his Broadway career in 1977 as a production assistant on the Broadway revival of Porgy and Bess, produced by Sherwin M. Goldman and the Houston Grand Opera. He also served as a production assistant on the pre-Broadway try out of Nefertiti which starred Andrea Marcovicci and directed by Jack O'Brien.

As a director, writer, and producer, his career has taken him around the globe, to places such as Alaska, Singapore, and theatres such as London's Royal Albert Hall and Royal Festival Hall, Carnegie Hall, The Sydney Opera House, The Village Vanguard, Feinstein's/54 Below in New York City, Laxness Arena-Cologne, Germany, The Metropolitan Opera House, The Hollywood Bowl, Joe's Pub at The Public Theatre, Brooklyn's Barclays Center, Bloomfield Stadium in Tel Aviv, London's O2 Arena, O2 World Berlin, and many others.

Jay-Alexander has also contributed lyrics to projects for Disney Records. He is an occasional contributor to Broadwayworld.com where he is particularly known for a series called "All Eyes On," interviewing legends like Angela Lansbury, Josh Groban, Sir Ian McKellen, Rose Marie, Bob Avian, Ann-Margret, and Barry Manilow about his Broadway-bound Harmony. He has also authored liner notes for reissues of musicals such as the original, Jacques Brel is Alive and Well and Living in Paris, and four titles from the Stephen Sondheim Columbia Masterworks/Sony canon: Merrily We Roll Along, Into The Woods, Sweeney Todd: The Demon Barber of Fleet Street, and Sunday In The Park With George, giving them context all these years later as to their place in history and with 20-20 hindsight.

A self proclaimed Bravoholic, Jay-Alexander has made appearances on Luann & Sonja: Welcome to Crappie Lake, The Real Housewives of New York City, and accidentally appeared on The Real Housewives of Miami. He has also twice appeared as a bartender on Watch What Happens Live! As an extension of the reality world, he was asked to be a guest with Bethenny Frankel and Kevin O'Leary on CNBC Money Court as a consultant, regarding Broadway.

== More Recent Projects ==
Jay-Alexander has worked with many performers, including Kristin Chenoweth, Bernadette Peters, Barbra Streisand, Bette Midler, Julie Andrews, Brian Stokes Mitchell, Lea Salonga, Sam Harris, Polly Bergen, Russell Watson, Il Volo, Il Divo, Norm Lewis, Laurie Beechman, Debby Boone, Mandy Gonzalez, Mary Cleere Haran, Roslyn Kind, Melissa Errico, Lea Michele, Betty Buckley, Donny & Marie Osmond, Ricky Martin, Well-Strung, Donna McKechnie, Melora Hardin, Jennifer Leigh Warren, and others.

For several years he has directed the Chaplin Awards for Film at Lincoln Center. The annual event has honored such luminaries Barbra Streisand, Robert Redford, Rob Reiner, Robert De Niro, Morgan Freeman, Helen Mirren, as well as the 50th Anniversary Gala. Also, Spike Lee, Viola Davis, and most recently, Jeff Bridges.

His work with Barbra Streisand can be seen on various DVD products or PBS specials including: Streisand: 2006 Tour; Barbra Streisand: One Night Only at The Village Vanguard; Barbra Streisand: Back to Brooklyn; Barbra: The Music, The Mem'ries, The Magic (Netflix).

PBS audiences will also recognize his work from Bernadette Peters Live from Royal Festival Hall, Il Volo: We Are Love and Il Volo: Buon Natale, Russell Watson "(The Voice)" Live At the Taj Mahal with Natalie Cole and Lea Salonga and Russell Watson Live at the Auckland Domain in New Zealand, introducing Hayley Westenra.

He also brought hit songwriter Desmond Child back to the stage, after a 30-year absence, and debuted a show at Feinstein's 54 Below which was later filmed for PBS as part of The Kate Series in Connecticut.

In 2018, Richard co-produced the Norm Lewis Christmas Album with Mr. Lewis and they have done an annual Christmas concert run at Feinstein's 54 Below since 2015.

His work can also be seen on Live From Lincoln Center with exemplary concerts such as Kristin Chenoweth: The Dames of Broadway... All of 'em!!! (2013) and Norm Lewis: Who Am I? (2015), as well as two specials with Russell Watson for PBS.

From 2013 to 2018, Richard directed the Latin Songwriters Hall of Fame, La Musa Awards. Founded by Desmond Child and Rudy Amado Pérez, the awards featured Latin stars, composers, lyricists, bands, legendary musicians, and industry recording executives.

In 2009, Richard helmed a production of I Do! I Do! starring real-life married couple, Paige Davis and Patrick Page at San Diego's Old Globe Theatre. He was thrilled about this because the first show he ever directed in college was The Fantasticks, also by Tom Jones and Harvey Schmidt. In 2017 he was asked to direct an evening honoring the two legends and their prestigious careers receiving the Oscar Hammerstein II Award by the York Theatre Company.

He directed, what he claims, to be his final production of Les Misérables at The Muny in St. Louis, Missouri in summer of 2013. He promised it would be his last having directed and staged 11 productions of the legendary musical since 1987, including the first-ever bilingual company in Montreal performing five performances a week in French and three in English, produced by Cameron Mackintosh and Ed and David Mirvish. Richard also directed the original Canadian production in Toronto with an all Canadian cast, and its subsequent Canadian tour.

In 2005, Richard directed A Safe Harbor for Elizabeth Bishop written by Brazil's Marta Góes. It was the first English translation and starred Amy Irving. The show was a part of the New York Stage and Film Summer Program at Vassar College where poet, Ms. Bishop, attended. It then moved to New York City and played Primary Stages in the spring of 2006.

In 2002, Richard directed his first original gay-themed play titled, The Nature of the Beach, written by David Sexton.

Richard directed two shows in Las Vegas; Storm at the Mandalay Bay and the reboot of Donny & Marie at The Flamingo in the Flamingo Hotel and Showroom.

In 2011, he worked with opera singer Deborah Voigt directing a theatrical piece entitled "Deborah Voigt, Voigt Lessons" which was written by Terrence McNally and originally developed by Voigt, McNally and director Francesca Zambello.

In 1998 in Miami, he presented a prestigious series with Ellen Wedner called "Manhattan Nights in Miami." It featured performances by David Campbell, John Bucchino, Mary Cleere Haran, Sir Richard Rodney Bennett, Steven Brinberg (as Simply Barbra), and Barbara Cook.

In the early '80s, after being part of the original cast and an assistant stage manager for Amadeus on Broadway, he directed the national tours.

He directed the Spanish World Premiere of Peter Shaffer's Amadeus at the Teatro Nacional in Santiago Chile with Britain's Roger Williams.

Richard christened a series of new venues including The Kodak Theatre in Hollywood, California with Russell Watson; Toronto's Skydome with a concert version of Les Misérables, co-directed by Keith Batten; The Dr. Phillips Center for the Performing Arts and their Walt Disney Theatre with a cast of Norm Lewis, Sierra Boggess, Chris Mann, Deborah Voigt, Michael Urie, Jane Monheit, Ektor Rivera, The Lombard Twins, and The Broadway Kids.

Most recently, Jay-Alexander is collaborated with reality star, Countess Luann de Lesseps from The Real Housewives of New York City on her debut cabaret show, "Countess Cabaret," as well as "A Very Countess Christmas" and her latest show, "Marry, F, Kill!" which is currently touring around the world.

== Stage performances ==
- Amadeus – 1980
- Zoot Suit – 1978
- The Me Nobody Knows – 1977
- Boy Meets Boy – 1976

== Recordings ==
He has produced, co-produced, and executive produced many recordings and original cast albums including:

Johnny Mathis On Broadway; Sondheim, Etc. Etc. Part 2: Bernadette Peters Live at Carnegie Hall (Grammy Nomination); Bernadette Peters Loves Rodgers & Hammerstein (Grammy Nomination); Brian Stokes Mitchell's solo debut album; Mary Cleere Haran: Pennies From Heaven; Melora Hardin: All The Way To Mars; the original Broadway cast recording of Five Guys Named Moe; The Norm Lewis Christmas Album; Betty Buckley: 1967 and Quintessence; Hugh Panaro, Man Without A Mask. Melissa Errico: Legrand Affair. Catherine Hickland: Sincerely Broadway.

== Stage production ==
- Putting It Together- Associate Director - 1993
- Five Guys Named Moe – Associate Director / Executive Producer – 1992
- Miss Saigon – Executive Producer – 1991
- Les Misérables – Associate Director / Executive Producer – 1987
- Song and Dance – Stage manager – 1985
- Oliver! – Assistant stage manager / Dance captain – 1984
- Amadeus – Assistant stage manager – 1980
