= The Christmas Album (Johnny Mathis album) =

Studio album by Johnny Mathis
- Released: October 15, 2002
- Recorded: 2002
- Studio: Schnee Studio, North Hollywood, California, The Hop, Studio City, California, Windmill Lane Studios, Dublin, Ireland, Aire Born Studios, Zionsville, Indiana, The Hop North; Vancouver, British Columbia
- Genre: Vocal; holiday; pop/rock
- Length: 30:31
- Label: Columbia
- Producer: Robbie Buchanan

Johnny Mathis chronology
Mathis on Broadway (2000)	The Christmas Album (2002)	The Essential Johnny Mathis (2004)

Professional ratings
Review scores
Source	Rating
Allmusic	3/5 stars

The Christmas Album is the fifth Christmas album by American pop singer Johnny Mathis that was released on October 15, 2002, by Columbia Records and included his first recordings of three traditional carols ("Joy To The World", "Away in a Manger", "O Little Town of Bethlehem"), three new songs ("Heavenly Peace", "A Christmas Love Song", "Merry Christmas"), and a handful of 20th-century offerings.

In December of that year, the album reached number 23 on Billboard magazine's Top Holiday Albums chart and number 143 on the Billboard 200.

The album also gave Mathis his first entry on Billboard's list of the top Adult Contemporary songs of the week since 1988's number 27 hit "I'm on the Outside Looking In", when "Frosty the Snowman" reached number 29 during the week it spent on the chart in the issue dated January 4, 2003.

Mathis is pictured on the cover at the age of four years.

== Reception ==
This holiday outing elicited another positive review from William Ruhlmann of AllMusic: "Backed by the Irish Film Orchestra, which can be alternately lush and swinging, Mathis creates yet another winning collection."

== Track listing ==
From the liner notes for the original album:

1. "Joy To The World" (Lowell Mason, Isaac Watts) – 2:01
  - Bob Krogstad – arranger
2. "Heavenly Peace" (Dean Pitchford, Tom Snow) – 3:30
  - Robbie Buchanan – arranger
3. "Away in a Manger" (William J. Kirkpatrick) – 2:30
  - Robbie Buchanan – arranger
4. "A Christmas Love Song" (Alan and Marilyn Bergman, Johnny Mandel) – 3:35
  - Alan Broadbent – arranger
5. "Frosty the Snowman" (Steve Nelson, Jack Rollins) – 2:31
  - Bob Krogstad – arranger
6. "Have a Holly Jolly Christmas" (Johnny Marks) – 2:00
  - Ray Ellis – arranger
7. "O Little Town of Bethlehem" (Phillip Brooks, Lewis H. Redner) – 2:44
  - Jonathan Tunick – arranger
8. "I've Got My Love to Keep Me Warm" (Irving Berlin) – 3:34
  - Bob Krogstad – arranger
9. Medley – 5:00
  a. "Snowfall" (Claude Thornhill)
  b. "Christmas Time Is Here" (Vince Guaraldi, Lee Mendelson)
  - Bob Krogstad – arranger
10. "Merry Christmas" (Fred Spielman, Janice Torre) – 3:12
  - Jonathan Tunick – arranger

== Personnel ==
From the liner notes for the original album:

Performers

- Johnny Mathis – vocals
- Robbie Buchanan – keyboards, bass, drums
- Randy Waldman – piano
- Vinnie Colaiuta – drums
- Dave Carpenter – bass
- Dean Parks – acoustic guitar
- Michael Landau – electric guitar
- The Irish Film Orchestra – orchestra
- Ken Krogstad – orchestra conductor

Production

- Robbie Buchanan – producer
- Jay Landers – executive producer
- Scott Erickson – associate producer, recording engineer
- Bill Schnee – mixing engineer
- Dan Garcia – recording engineer
- Andrew Boland – recording engineer
- John Bolt – recording engineer
- Ryan Petrie – assistant recording engineer
- Kiran Lynch – assistant recording engineer
- Doug Sax – mastering
- Robert Hadley – mastering
- Catirona Walsh – orchestra management
- Dick Bolks – music preparation
- Ross DeRoche – music preparation
- Scott Erickson – music preparation
- Terry Woodson Music – music preparation
- Emily Grishman Music – music preparation
- Douglas Walter – music preparation
- Christine Wilson – art direction
- Russell Laschinger – cover and family pictures
- David Vance – back cover photography
- Mastered at The Mastering Lab, Hollywood, California

== Bibliography ==
- Whitburn, Joel (2004), Christmas in the Charts (1920-2004), Record Research Inc., ISBN 0-89820-161-6
- Whitburn, Joel (2007), Joel Whitburn Presents Billboard Top Adult Songs, 1961-2006, Record Research Inc., ISBN 978-0898201697
