= Hugh Adamson =

Scottish footballer

Personal information
- Full name: Hugh Adamson
- Date of birth: 21 April 1885
- Place of birth: Halbeath, Scotland
- Position: Defender

Senior career*
Years	Team	Apps	(Gls)
?-?	Dunfermline Athletic	?	(?)
?-?	Lochgelly United	?	(?)
1907–1909	Everton	25	(0)
1909–1911	Bolton Wanderers	15	(0)
?-?	South Liverpool	?	(?)
- * Club domestic league appearances and goals

Hugh Adamson (born 21 April 1885 in Halbeath, Scotland) was a footballer who played in the Football League for Bolton Wanderers and Everton.
