= Say One for Me =

1959 film by Frank Tashlin

Say One For Me
- Theatrical release poster
- Directed by: Frank Tashlin
- Written by: Robert O'Brien
- Produced by: Frank Tashlin
- Starring: Bing Crosby; Debbie Reynolds; Robert Wagner
- Cinematography: Leo Tover
- Edited by: Hugh S. Fowler
- Music by: Lionel Newman (Conductor / Music supervisor)
- Color process: Color by DeLuxe
- Production company: Bing Crosby Productions
- Distributed by: 20th Century Fox
- Release date: June 19, 1959
- Running time: 119 minutes
- Country: United States
- Language: English
- Budget: $1,990,000
- Box office: $3.9 million (est. US/ Canada rentals)

Say One For Me is a 1959 American comedy musical film directed by Frank Tashlin and starring Bing Crosby, Debbie Reynolds and Robert Wagner. Stella Stevens made her film debut in Say One for Me and received the Golden Globe Award in 1960 for New Star of the Year-Actress for this film.

== Plot ==
In the middle of New York's theater district sits Father Conroy's parish, where entertainers often attend his services. His parishioners include Holly LeMaise, whose dad Harry was an old vaudevillian. Holly takes a job as a showgirl in a nightclub to pay the medical bills when her father falls ill. The featured entertainer at the club is Tony Vincent, a playboy whose romantic advances Holly wards off. But soon she develops feelings for him.

Father Conroy befriends the former songwriter Phil Stanley, whose alcoholism and hard times have left him playing piano in Tony's act. The priest annoys Tony by seemingly interfering with Holly's personal life and now Phil's as well. Tony lands a job at a Miami hotel and tries to manipulate Holly into going along.

As a charity event, Father Conroy organizes a big show that will be on nationwide TV. Tony, having lost the Miami job, desperately wants to perform on it. To prove his true intent to Holly, the priest offers to book Tony on television provided he tells Holly their relationship is over. Holly is shocked when he accepts.

When it's his turn to sing, Tony's guilty conscience gives him a change of heart. He gives up his time on the TV show to Phil, who has written a new song. Father Conroy is pleased, and soon finds himself officiating at Holly's and Tony's wedding.

== Cast ==
- Bing Crosby as Father Conroy
- Debbie Reynolds as Holly LeMaise aka Conroy
- Robert Wagner as Tony Vincent
- Ray Walston as Phil Stanley
- Les Tremayne as Harry LeMaise
- Connie Gilchrist as Mary
- Frank McHugh as Jim Dugan
- Joe Besser as Joe Greb
- Alena Murray as Sunny
- Stella Stevens as Chorine
- Nina Shipman as Fay Flagg
- Sebastian Cabot as Monsignor Francis Stratford
- Judy Harriet as June January aka Dawn Easter

== Premiere performances ==
Filmed in CinemaScope between December 1958 and February 1959, the film had several "premiere" performances in June 1959. On June 19, 1959, Say One for Me had its premiere at Buffalo, New York. The event formed part of fund raising activities for Buffalo Boy's Town run by Father Kelliher. There was also a gala benefit premier at the Pantages Theatre (Hollywood) on Hollywood Boulevard on the same day with the proceeds going to the Daniel Freeman Hospital, Inglewood and the Jesuit Scholasticata.

In addition on June 20, the Fox Theater in El Centro, Southern California, showed the film and personal appearances were made by Bing Crosby, Robert Wagner, Natalie Wood, and Ricardo Montalbán. This was part of a benefit for Our Lady of Guadalupe Church and parish in El Centro, organized by Father Victor Salandini, and $7000 was raised. On June 29, 1959, a 30th anniversary celebration took place at the Fox Theater in San Francisco (opened June 28, 1929) with a special advance screening of Say One for Me.

== Reception ==
Variety was not impressed. "Basic idea in Robert O’Brien’s story probably had potentialities. It’s a “Going My Way” sort of affair with Bing Crosby again as a priest with his target shifted from juvenile roughnecks to show business delinquents. But something went wrong in the development; the entertainment values are short of impressive and the boxoffice will have to depend on Crosby and Debbie Reynolds as the marquee names...Crosby turns in a curiously inhibited performance. He plays the role tight, not at all like the free-wheeling, leisurely-paced Crosby of yore, but the voice is still there..."

Bosley Crowther of The New York Times had some kind words. "...It is a pleasant show-world entertainment, this obvious “Say One for Me,” full of pretty girls with shapely legs, a few song numbers (two sung by Bing) and religious images. Robert O’Brien has contributed a screen play that is loaded with slang. Broadway gags that are easily comprehended and not too much clerical sentiment....As for Bing—well, he's just about as usual, a little less lively, perhaps, a little older looking, but still casual and sincere. He'll never make Monsignor. He'll always be a parish priest, whenever he turns his collar backward, because you always sense a sport shirt underneath."

The Hollywood Citizen News review was direct in its appraisal. "A pleasant, if sometimes monotonous, photodrama with music . . . For visual appeal, this new 20th. Century-Fox film, in color and CinemaScope, is a world-beater. . . A handsome production from start to finish, it misses only in the departments of story, direction and acting, three important categories, nonetheless."

The film was a surprise success, doing good business everywhere it opened, opening at number one at the US box office.

== Musical numbers ==
All the songs were written by Jimmy Van Heusen (music) and Sammy Cahn (lyrics). Lionel Newman conducted the musical backing for the film and he was nominated for an Academy Award for Best Original Score.

- "Say One for Me" - Sung by Bing Crosby and Debbie Reynolds
- "You Can't Love Them All" - Sung by Debbie Reynolds and Robert Wagner
- "You Can't Love Them All" (reprise 1) - Danced by Robert Wagner and Chorus Girls
- "The Girl Most Likely To Succeed" - Sung and Danced by Debbie Reynolds and Robert Wagner
- "You Can't Love Them All" (reprise 2) - Performed by Orchestra and Chorus
- "I Couldn't Care Less" - Sung by Bing Crosby
- "Cha Cha Choo Choo" - Sung and Danced by Debbie Reynolds, Robert Wagner and Chorus Girls
- "The Night That Rock And Roll Died" - Danced by Robert Wagner
- "The Secret of Christmas" - Played on a piano and Sung by Ray Walston
- "Say One for Me" (reprise) - Sung by Bing Crosby
- "The Night That Rock And Roll Died" - Sung by Judy Harriet (dubbed by Rosemary June) (In an interview at Disney's D23 Expo 2015 on August 16, 2015, performer Judy Harriet confirmed that her voice was not dubbed in the song; but that it was her own performance that appears on screen)
- "The Secret of Christmas" (reprise) - Sung by Bing Crosby, Debbie Reynolds, Robert Wagner and Chorus.

A soundtrack album was issued by Columbia Records.
