= Louis Halmy =

American jazz musician (1911–2005)

- Born: June 23, 1911; Budapest, Hungary
- Died: March 14, 2005 (aged 93); Eugene, Oregon
- Occupations: musician, arranger/transcriber
- Known for: The Big Broadcast of 1938

Louis Halmy, also known as Lou Halmy, (June 23, 1911 – March 14, 2005) was a jazz musician and music arranger.

== Early life ==
Halmy was born on June 23rd, 1911 in Budapest, Hungary. His family immigrated to the United States when he was two, settling on the East Coast. He had at least one sister named Margaret.

== Career ==
In the 1930s he played trumpet with Shep Fields and His Rippling Rhythm Orchestra and appeared with the orchestra in the film The Big Broadcast of 1938. For most of his career he worked as an arranger and transcriber of musical compositions including such notable songs as "Thanks for the Memory" (1938), "Louie Louie" (1955), "Tequila" (1958), and "Raindrops Keep Fallin' on My Head" (1969). In all, the United States Copyright Office records 274 entries for Halmy between 1951 and 2003. Halmy was also a virtuosic whistler, which was a talent he employed as a transcriber and as a performer.

Halmy would get around 6 calls a year regarding his whistling.
