= A Marshmallow World =

1949 song

"A Marshmallow World" (sometimes called "It's a Marshmallow World") is a popular song that was written in 1949 by Carl Sigman (lyrics) and Peter DeRose (music). It was published the following year by Shapiro, Bernstein & Co. The song is about winter and is commonly regarded as a Christmas song in the Northern Hemisphere, although the lyrics make no mention of the holiday.

The song was first a hit for Bing Crosby (backed by the Lee Gordon Singers and Sonny Burke and his Orchestra). Crosby's version, recorded in 1950, peaked at No. 24 on Billboard's Best Selling Pop Singles chart in the issue dated January 6, 1951. Other artists who recorded the song in 1950 include Ray Anthony, Vic Damone, Johnny Desmond, Arthur Godfrey, Vaughn Monroe, and Jo Stafford.

The song compares a snowfall to marshmallows covering the ground. It also describes the snowfall as whipped cream and the sun as a red pumpkin head. The singer "waits for it the whole year 'round."

== In media ==
- The song was featured in the episode "Hal's Christmas Gift" of the American sitcom Malcolm in the Middle, during a scene involving a destructive vehicular encounter.
- In the 1967 Dean Martin Show Christmas Special, Dean Martin and Frank Sinatra sung a Duet of the song in the beginning of the episode

== Later versions ==
- Darlene Love (on the 1963 compilation album A Christmas Gift for You from Phil Spector)
- Johnny Mathis (on his 1963 album Sounds of Christmas)
- Hugo Winterhalter (on his 1963 album A Season for My Beloved)
- Brenda Lee (on her 1964 album Merry Christmas from Brenda Lee)
- Dean Martin (on his 1966 album The Dean Martin Christmas Album)
- The Bluebeats (on the 1996 compilation album Christma-Ska on Moon Ska Records)
- God Is My Co-Pilot (on the 1996 compilation album The Christmas Album)
- Los Straitjackets (on their 2002 album 'Tis the Season for Los Straitjackets!)
- Matt Dusk (on his 2004 album Peace on Earth)
- The Cheetah Girls (on their 2005 album Cheetah-licious Christmas)
- Math and Physics Club (on a 2005 digital download via their website)
- Regis Philbin and Steve Tyrell (on the 2005 album The Regis Philbin Christmas Album)
- Kim Stockwood (on her 2006 album I Love Santa)
- Raul Malo (on his 2007 album Marshmallow World & Other Holiday Favorites)
- Jessica Martin and Mark Steyn (on a 2008 digital download)
- Ernie Haase & Signature Sound (on their 2009 album Every Light That Shines at Christmas)
- Mandy Barnett (on her 2010 album Winter Wonderland)
- Jessica Martin and Mark Steyn (on a 2010 digital download - 'Disco Fever Edition')
- Emmy the Great and Tim Wheeler (on their 2011 album This Is Christmas)
- Francesca Battistelli (on her 2012 album Christmas)
- Juniper Jones (in a 2013 holiday commercial for Cooking Channel)
- Nataly Dawn and Ryan Lerman (2014 single)
- Seth MacFarlane (on his 2014 album Holiday for Swing)
- Karen O (in a 2014 holiday commercial for Target stores)
- Garth Brooks and Trisha Yearwood (on their 2016 album Christmas Together)
- The Regrettes (on a 2016 single)
- She & Him (on their 2016 album Christmas Party)
- Steam Powered Giraffe (on a 2016 single)
- Kazumi Evans
- The Lone Bellow (on the 2019 Dualtone Christmas compilation album A Dualtone Christmas)
