= Sounds of Christmas =

Studio album by Johnny Mathis
- Released: October 4, 1963
- Recorded: July 12, 16, 17, 25, 1963
- Genre: Christmas
- Length: 38:19
- Label: Mercury Records
- Producer: Don Costa

Johnny Mathis chronology
Johnny (1963)	Sounds of Christmas (1963)	Romantically (1963)

Christmas with Johnny Mathis
- 1971 reissue cover

Sounds of Christmas is the second holiday-themed album by vocalist Johnny Mathis and the first of his 11 studio projects for Mercury Records. His first yuletide effort, 1958's Merry Christmas, relied heavily on popular holiday carols and standards, but this 1963 release also included two new songs (the title track and "Have Reindeer, Will Travel") as well as covers of some lesser-known recordings by Andy Williams ("Christmas Is a Feeling in Your Heart") and Bing Crosby ("A Marshmallow World" and "The Secret of Christmas").

This album also differs from the 1958 LP in terms of how Billboard magazine gauged its success. Merry Christmas reached number three on the pop album chart that eventually became known as the Billboard 200. In 1963, however, the magazine began publishing special weekly Christmas Albums sales charts, where Sounds of Christmas spent two weeks at number two during that holiday season. It appeared on the magazine’s seasonal LP chart each year from 1964 to 1968 as well.

Two songs from the album, "The Little Drummer Boy" and "Have Reindeer, Will Travel", were released that year as a single, and the former spent its one week on the Billboard's Christmas Singles chart at number 21 in December 1963 and had another one-week showing there at number 11 in December 1964.

In 1971, Columbia Records reissued the album on its budget Harmony imprint as Christmas with Johnny Mathis, with different cover art and the two songs from the 1963 single omitted. This incarnation of the album was later reissued on compact disc. The complete album was issued on CD with its original title, art, and track list by Legacy Recordings in November 2014 as part of the box set The Complete Global Albums Collection. The 2015 Mathis compilation The Complete Christmas Collection 1958–2010, a 3-CD set on the Real Gone Music label, also includes the entirety of the Sounds of Christmas album in its track list.

== History ==
After a highly successful career as a recording artist with Columbia Records from 1956 to 1963, Mathis moved to Mercury Records, for which he recorded exclusively from 1963 to 1967, releasing thirteen singles and ten studio albums (as well as recording an 11th long player, Broadway, that went unreleased until 2014). The change was motivated by a desire for greater control over his recordings that would include owning the masters. This album was the first to be recorded by the singer's own production company, Global Records, for distribution by Mercury.

In the liner notes for The Complete Global Albums Collection, Mathis commented on two of the songs he chose. "For this album, I decided to record the 'Hallelujah Chorus' and the 'Carol of the Bells'—I just sang my part, the part that all the tenors sing in these particular compositions. I had no problem about doing it. My only concern was how I would get my voice to be predominant if I sang only one part of the melody." (Mathis is given adaptation credit for these two songs.) He continued, "You know, when you’re young, nothing frightens you. The fact that I had sung these songs in school for years, with all kinds of choirs, I thought, why not, let’s do it. And as the years went on, people got used to hearing those songs at Christmas time."

== Reception ==
Professional ratings
Review scores
Source	Rating
Allmusic	Review
Billboard	positive
The Encyclopedia of Popular Music	3/5 stars

Billboard wrote, "Arrangements by Don Costa are tasteful" and noted that the album included "some fine newer tunes."

== Track listing ==
=== Side one ===
1. "The Sounds of Christmas" (Jerry Livingston, Paul Francis Webster) — 2:35
2. "Have Yourself a Merry Little Christmas" from Meet Me in St. Louis (Ralph Blane, Hugh Martin) — 3:34
3. "A Marshmallow World" (Peter DeRose, Carl Sigman) — 2:37
4. "God Rest Ye Merry, Gentlemen" (traditional) — 3:19
5. "Let It Snow! Let It Snow! Let It Snow!" (Sammy Cahn, Jule Styne) — 4:12
6. "The Little Drummer Boy" (Katherine Davis, Henry Onorati, Harry Simeone) — 3:32

=== Side two ===
1. "Have Reindeer, Will Travel" (Livingston, Webster) — 3:31
2. "The Secret of Christmas" from Say One for Me (Cahn, Jimmy Van Heusen) — 4:12
3. "Rudolph the Red-Nosed Reindeer" (Johnny Marks) — 2:20
4. "Carol of the Bells" (Mykola Leontovych, Peter J. Wilhousky) — 1:22
5. "Christmas Is a Feeling in Your Heart" (Joe Darion, Joe Kleinsinger) — 3:03
6. "Hallelujah Chorus" from the oratorio Messiah (George Frederick Handel) — 4:02

== Recording dates ==
From the liner notes for The Complete Global Albums Collection:

- July 12, 1963 — "The Secret of Christmas", "The Sounds of Christmas"
- July 16, 1963 — "Christmas Is a Feeling in Your Heart", "Have Reindeer, Will Travel"
- July 17, 1963 — "Carol of the Bells", "Hallelujah Chorus", "Have Yourself a Merry Little Christmas", "Let It Snow! Let It Snow! Let It Snow!", "A Marshmallow World", "Rudolph the Red-Nosed Reindeer"
- July 25, 1963 — "God Rest Ye Merry, Gentlemen", "The Little Drummer Boy"

== Billboard Christmas Albums chart positions ==
Debut date	Peak position
11/30/63	2
12/5/64	7
12/18/65	13
12/17/66	45
12/9/67	18
12/14/68	11

== Personnel ==
- Johnny Mathis – vocals; adaptation ("Carol of the Bells", "God Rest Ye Merry, Gentlemen", "Hallelujah Chorus")
- Don Costa – producer
- Glenn Osser – arranger
- Jack Feierman – conductor

== Bibliography ==
- Whitburn, Joel (2004), Christmas in the Charts (1920-2004), Record Research Inc., ISBN 0-89820-161-6
- Whitburn, Joel (2010), Joel Whitburn Presents Top Pop Albums, Seventh Edition, Record Research Inc., ISBN 978-0-89820-183-3
