= Christmas Eve with Johnny Mathis =

Studio album by Johnny Mathis
- Released: September 23, 1986
- Recorded: July 1986
- Studio: One on One Studios, North Hollywood, Los Angeles, California, Conway Studios, Hollywood, California, Ocean Way Recording, Hollywood, California
- Genre: Vocal; holiday
- Length: 33:28
- Label: Columbia
- Producer: Denny Diante

Johnny Mathis chronology
16 Most Requested Songs (1986)	Christmas Eve with Johnny Mathis (1986)	The Hollywood Musicals (1986)

Alternate cover

Professional ratings
Review scores
Source	Rating
Allmusic	3/5 stars
People	negative

Christmas Eve with Johnny Mathis is the fourth Christmas album by American pop singer Johnny Mathis that was released on September 23, 1986, by Columbia Records. This was Mathis's fourth holiday-themed LP and focused exclusively on secular material.

The album spent a week on Billboard magazine's Christmas Albums chart in the issue dated December 12, 1992, (no such chart was published in 1986) and two weeks on its Top Pop Catalog Albums chart in December 1994.

The recording of "Jingle Bells" on this release is subtitled "(Let's Take a Sleigh Ride)" on the front and back covers of the album jacket. (The CD booklet does not include song titles on the cover.) The track opens with background vocalists singing, "Let's take a sleigh ride, a merry sleigh ride," and the subtitle is inserted into each refrain of the chorus. Although no credit for additional lyrics is cited, the credit for the arranger of this rendition, Ray Ellis, is listed with the songwriter's name on the LP label.

The album's opener, "It's Beginning to Look a Lot Like Christmas", was featured in the 1992 holiday release Home Alone 2: Lost in New York and included on its original soundtrack album. In the issue of Billboard dated November 28, 2009, the list of the "Top 10 Holiday Songs (Since 2001)" places the Mathis recording at number 10.

== Reception ==
People magazine's reviewer, Ralph Novak, describes Mathis's singing on the album as "characteristically smooth, yet never very engaged", and feels that the arrangements "tend to big stringy orchestrations that are too much for intimacy and not passionate enough for majesty."

== Track listing ==
All tracks recorded in July 1986. Personnel information taken from the liner notes for the original album:

1. "It's Beginning to Look a Lot Like Christmas" (Meredith Willson) – 2:14
  - Jeremy Lubbock – arranger, conductor
  - John Arrias – recording engineer
  - Gerald Vinci – concertmaster
  - Jules Chaikin – contractor
2. "Toyland" from Babes in Toyland (Glen MacDonough, Victor Herbert) – 3:41
  - Ray Ellis – arranger, conductor
  - John Arrias – recording engineer
  - Gerald Vinci – concertmaster
  - Joe Soldo – contractor
3. "It's the Most Wonderful Time of the Year" (Edward Pola, George Wyle) – 2:45
  - Jeremy Lubbock – arranger, conductor
  - John Arrias – recording engineer
  - Gerald Vinci – concertmaster
  - Jules Chaikin – contractor
4. "Jingle Bells" (James Pierpont) – 2:54
  - Ray Ellis – arranger, conductor
  - Daren Klein – recording engineer
  - Erno Neufeld – concertmaster
  - Marion Klein – contractor
5. Medley – 5:09
  a. "Christmas Is for Everyone" (Richard Loring, Dorothy Wayne)
  b. "Where Can I Find Christmas?" from The Bear Who Slept Through Christmas (Doug Goodwin)
  - Ray Ellis – arranger, conductor
  - Daren Klein – recording engineer
  - Erno Neufeld – concertmaster
  - Marion Klein – contractor
  - International Children's Choir (Irene Bayless, director) – backing vocals
  - The kids from St. Michael's School, North Hollywood – backing vocals
6. Medley from Santa Claus: The Movie – 4:03
  a. "Every Christmas Eve" (Leslie Bricusse, Henry Mancini)
  b. "Giving (Santa's Theme)" (Bricusse, Mancini)
  - Henry Mancini – arranger, conductor
  - Henry Mancini Orchestra & Chorus – performers
  - Mick Guzauski – recording engineer
  - Erno Neufeld – concertmaster
  - Marion Klein – contractor
7. "The Christmas Waltz" (Sammy Cahn, Jule Styne) – 2:36
  - Ray Ellis – arranger, conductor
  - John Arrias – recording engineer
  - Gerald Vinci – concertmaster
  - Joe Soldo – contractor
8. "We Need a Little Christmas" from Mame (Jerry Herman) – 1:54
  - Ray Ellis – arranger, conductor
  - John Arrias – recording engineer
  - Gerald Vinci – concertmaster
  - Joe Soldo – contractor
9. Medley – 3:44
  a. "Caroling, Caroling" (Alfred Burt, Wilha Hutson)
  b. "Happy Holiday" from Holiday Inn (Irving Berlin)
  - Jeremy Lubbock – arranger, conductor
  - John Arrias – recording engineer
  - Gerald Vinci – concertmaster
  - Jules Chaikin – contractor
10. "It's Christmas Time Again" (Sonny Burke, John Elliot, James K. Harwood) – 4:28
  - Jeremy Lubbock – arranger, conductor
  - John Arrias – recording engineer
  - Gerald Vinci – concertmaster
  - Jules Chaikin – contractor

== Personnel ==
From the liner notes for the original album:

- Johnny Mathis – vocals
- Denny Diante – producer
- Richard Loring – musical consultant
- Monica Mancini – vocal contractor
- John Arrias – mixing engineer
- Chris Bellman – mastering engineer
- Jo-Anne McGettrick – production coordinator
- Nancy Donald – art direction
- Tony Lane – art direction
- Peter Greco – lettering
- David Vance – photographer
- 24 Collection – wardrobe
- Jeff Bennett (One on One Studios) – assistant engineer
- Greg Dennen (One on One Studios) – assistant engineer
- Michael Dubois (One on One Studios) – assistant engineer
- Daren Klein (Conway Studios) – assistant engineer
- Richard McKernan (Conway Studios) – assistant engineer
- Joe Schiff (Ocean Way) – assistant engineer
- Toby Wright (One on One Studios) – assistant engineer
- Jessie Peck – Conway Studios assistant
- Joe Gastwirt (Digital Magnetics Studio) – compact disc preparation
- Mastered at Bernie Grundman Mastering, Hollywood, California
- Mixed at Conway Studios, Hollywood, California

== Bibliography ==
- Cahn, Sammy (1974). I Should Care: The Sammy Cahn Story. New York: Arbor House. ISBN 0-87795-090-3.
- Whitburn, Joel (1994), Joel Whitburn's Pop Hits, 1940-1954, Record Research Inc., ISBN 0898201063
- Whitburn, Joel (2004), Christmas in the Charts (1920-2004), Record Research Inc., ISBN 0-89820-161-6
