= Michel Colombier =

French composer, arranger, conductor (1939–2004)

- Born: 23 May 1939; Lyon, France
- Died: 14 November 2004 (aged 65) Santa Monica, California, U.S.
- Genres: Film score
- Occupations: Composer, conductor
- Instrument: Keyboards
- Years active: 1962–2003
- Website: michelcolombier.com

Michel Colombier (23 May 1939 – 14 November 2004) was a French composer, arranger, and conductor.

== Career ==
Colombier wrote the scores of several motion pictures and TV productions. He also wrote chamber music and ballets. With composer Pierre Henry he wrote music for Messe pour le temps présent, a piece created by choreographer Maurice Béjart in 1967. He released an album on A&M Records, Wings, in 1971, which included a collaboration with Lani Hall on lead vocal, his song "We Could Be Flying", with lyrics by Paul Williams. Recorded in Paris, with Colombier on piano, it was also included on the album Sun Down Lady, Lani Hall's first solo album after her years as lead singer for Sérgio Mendes and Brazil 66, released in 1972 on A&M Records.

Colombier's piece "Emmanuel" was named after and written in memory of his young son, who died in infancy. It was used by the French television channel Antenne 2 (now known as France 2), alongside an 80-second animation known as Les Hommes volants (The Flying Men), by Jean-Michel Folon, as part of its sign-on and sign-off sequences between 1975 and 1983 in addition to the cover of the 1977 re-release of his 1971 album Wings.

== Death ==
Colombier died from cancer shortly after midnight on 14 November 2004. He left behind a widow, Dana Colombier, with whom he fathered two children. He is interred in Westwood Village Memorial Park Cemetery, Los Angeles.

== Selected film scores ==
- The Duke's Gold (1965)
- Anna (1967)
- Every Bastard a King (1968)
- Colossus: The Forbin Project (1970)
- Les Assassins de l'ordre (1971)
- Un flic (1972)
- The Inheritor (1973)
- Paul and Michelle (1974)
- Steel (1979)
- Une chambre en ville (1982)
- Against All Odds (1984)
- Purple Rain (1984)
- White Nights (1985)
- The Money Pit (1986)
- Ruthless People (1986)
- The Golden Child (1986)
- Surrender (1987)
- The Wild Pair (1987)
- The Couch Trip (1988)
- Cop (1988)
- Satisfaction (1988)
- Who's Harry Crumb? (1989)
- Out Cold (1989)
- Loverboy (1989)
- Asterix and the Big Fight (1989)
- Impulse (1990)
- Buried Alive (1990)
- Midnight Cabaret (1990)
- New Jack City (1991)
- The Dark Wind (1991)
- Strictly Business (1991)
- Deep Cover (1992)
- Folks! (1992)
- Posse (1993)
- The Program (1993)
- Major League II (1994)
- Élisa (1995)
- Mary & Tim (1996)
- Barb Wire (1996)
- Meet Wally Sparks (1997)
- Kiss of Fire (1998)
- Woo (1998)
- How Stella Got Her Groove Back (1998)
- Pros & Cons (1999)
- Screwed (2000)
- Swept Away (2002)
