= Merry Christmas (Johnny Mathis album) =

- Original LP cover

Studio album by Johnny Mathis
- Released: October 6, 1958
- Recorded: June 16, 18, and 20, 1958
- Studio: CBS 30th Street Studio; New York City
- Genre: Christmas
- Length: 44:08
- Label: Columbia
- Producer: Mitch Miller; Al Ham

Johnny Mathis chronology
Swing Softly (1958)	Merry Christmas (1958)	Open Fire, Two Guitars (1959)

Alternate cover
- Reissue LP cover

Professional ratings
Review scores
Source	Rating
Allmusic	link
The Encyclopedia of Popular Music	4/5 stars

Merry Christmas is the first Christmas album by American pop singer Johnny Mathis, with accompaniment by arranger/conductor Percy Faith and his orchestra. It was released by Columbia Records on October 6, 1958. The selections are a mix of traditional Christmas carols (such as "Silent Night", "O Holy Night", and "The First Noel") and 20th-century tunes of the season (including "The Christmas Song", "White Christmas", and "Silver Bells").

The album debuted on Billboard magazine's list of the 25 Best-Selling Pop LPs in the US in its December 15, 1958, issue and got as high as number three during its initial four-week run. It made additional appearances there each holiday season from 1959 to 1962 and on the magazine's Christmas Albums and Pop Catalog Albums charts in subsequent years. It received Gold certification from the Recording Industry Association of America for reaching sales of 500,000 copies in the US in December 1960 and in 2013 ranked as one of the top selling Christmas albums of all time with five million copies sold.

Four songs from the album – "Winter Wonderland", "Blue Christmas", "White Christmas", and "Sleigh Ride" – were also released on the EP Merry Christmas, Vol. 1, which reached number two during the 1958 holiday season and number seven the following year on the magazine's Best-Selling Pop EPs chart. "Winter Wonderland" also spent three weeks on the UK singles chart, where his recording peaked at number 17 over the course of three weeks that began on Christmas Day 1958.

The album was initially released only in the monaural format but became available in stereo in 1959. It was issued in the UK by Fontana Records and was later reissued in 1962 with a different cover both there and in the US. The original cover was used for compact disc pressings, the first of which was in 1984, and an edition featuring two bonus tracks was released on September 16, 2003. The 2015 Mathis compilation The Complete Christmas Collection 1958–2010, a 3-CD set on the Real Gone Music label, also includes the album in its track list.

== Track listing ==
=== Side one ===
1. "Winter Wonderland" (Richard B. Smith, Felix Bernard) – 3:19
2. "The Christmas Song" (Mel Tormé, Robert Wells) – 4:18
3. "Sleigh Ride" (Leroy Anderson, Mitchell Parish) – 2:58
4. "Blue Christmas" (Billy Hayes, Jay W. Johnson) – 3:02
5. "I'll Be Home for Christmas" (Buck Ram, Kim Gannon, Walter Kent) – 4:04
6. "White Christmas" from Holiday Inn (Irving Berlin) – 3:32

=== Side two ===
1. "O Holy Night" (Adolphe Adam) – 4:35
2. "What Child Is This? (Greensleeves)" (William Chatterton Dix) – 3:58
3. "The First Noel" (Traditional) – 3:49
4. "Silver Bells" from The Lemon Drop Kid (Jay Livingston, Ray Evans) – 3:34
5. "It Came Upon the Midnight Clear" (Richard Storrs Willis, Edmund Sears) – 3:08
6. "Silent Night, Holy Night" (Franz Xaver Gruber, Joseph Mohr) – 3:51

=== 2003 CD bonus tracks ===
1. "Christmas Eve" (Allyn Ferguson, Sidney Shaw) – 2:56
2. "My Kind of Christmas" (Jerry Livingston, Paul Francis Webster) – 3:02
  - above two released as a single on 11/17/61

== Recording dates ==
=== Original album ===
From the liner notes for the 2003 CD release:

- June 16, 1958– "The Christmas Song", "I'll Be Home for Christmas", "Silver Bells", "White Christmas"
- June 18, 1958– "Blue Christmas", "O Holy Night", "Sleigh Ride", "Winter Wonderland"
- June 20, 1958– "The First Noel", "It Came Upon the Midnight Clear", "Silent Night, Holy Night", "What Child Is This? (Greensleeves)"

=== 2003 CD bonus tracks ===
From the liner notes for The Complete Christmas Collection 1958-2010:

- September 11, 1961 – "Christmas Eve", "My Kind of Christmas"

== Billboard album chart positions ==
Debut date	Peak chart positions		
Debut date	Best-Selling Pop LPs	Christmas Albums	Top Pop Catalog Albums
12/15/58	3	—	—
12/21/59	10	—	—
12/26/60	10	—	—
12/18/61	31	—	—
12/8/62	12	—	—
11/30/63	—	2	—
12/5/64	—	2	—
12/11/65	—	7	—
12/3/66	—	2	—
12/2/67	—	2	—
12/7/68	—	5	—
12/27/69	—	15	—
12/1/73	—	3	—
12/24/88	—	18	—
12/23/89	—	20	—
12/22/90	—	16	—
12/7/91	—	17	—
12/14/91	—	—	24
11/28/92	—	—	10
12/5/92	—	12	—
12/4/93	—	21	14
12/3/94	—	35	—
12/10/94	—	—	29
12/16/95	—	—	37
12/21/96	—	—	33
12/28/96	—	39	—
12/19/98	—	—	48
12/18/99	—	—	49

== Personnel ==
=== Original album ===
- Johnny Mathis – vocals; liner notes
- Mitch Miller – producer
- Al Ham – producer
- Percy Faith – arranger and conductor
- Friedman Abeles – photography

=== 2003 CD bonus tracks ===
- Irving Townsend – producer
- Percy Faith – arranger and conductor

== Bibliography ==
- Whitburn, Joel (2004), Christmas in the Charts (1920-2004), Record Research Inc., ISBN 0-89820-161-6
