= It's Beginning to Look a Lot Like Christmas =

1951 Christmas song written by Meredith Willson

Song by Bing Crosby
- Language: English
- Published: 1951 by Plymouth Music
- Recorded: 1951
- Genre: Christmas
- Length: 2:45
- Label: RCA Victor
- Songwriter: Meredith Willson

"It's Beginning to Look a Lot Like Christmas" is a Christmas song written in 1951 by Meredith Willson. The song was originally titled "It's Beginning to Look Like Christmas". Perry Como was the first to record and release the song in 1951.

The song has become a standard recorded by many artists. It was first a hit for Perry Como and the Fontane Sisters with Mitchell Ayres & His Orchestra on September 18, 1951, released on RCA Victor as 47-4314 (45 rpm) and 20-4314 (78 rpm). Bing Crosby recorded a version on October 1, 1951, on Decca Records, which was also popular.

== History ==
=== Background and writing ===
A popular belief in Yarmouth, Nova Scotia, Canada, holds that Willson wrote the song while staying in Yarmouth's Grand Hotel. The song refers to a "tree in the Grand Hotel, one in the park as well..."; the park being Frost Park, directly across the road from the Grand Hotel, which still operates in a newer building on the same site as the old hotel. It also makes mention of the five and ten which was a store operating in Yarmouth at the time.

It is also possible that the "Grand Hotel" Willson mentions in the song was inspired by the Historic Park Inn Hotel in his hometown of Mason City, Iowa, US. The Park Inn Hotel is the last remaining hotel in the world designed by architect Frank Lloyd Wright, and is situated in downtown Mason City overlooking Central Park.

== Perry Como version ==
Perry Como and The Fontane Sisters with Mitchell Ayres & His Orchestra released their cover of "It's Beginning to Look a Lot Like Christmas" on September 18, 1951. Their edition became one of the most successful versions of the song, which is still widely played today, with over 382 million streams on Spotify as of May 1, 2024. The song is featured in the 2004 film The Polar Express.

=== Weekly charts ===
| Chart (2008–2026) | Peak position |
|---|---|
| Australia (ARIA) | 24 |
| Austria (Ö3 Austria Top 40) | 56 |
| Belgium (Ultratop 50 Wallonia) | 47 |
| Canada Hot 100 (Billboard) | 24 |
| Czech Republic Singles Digital (ČNS IFPI) | 44 |
| Estonia Airplay (TopHit) | 37 |
| France (SNEP) | 124 |
| Germany (GfK) | 83 |
| Global 200 (Billboard) | 22 |
| Greece International (IFPI) | 30 |
| Hungary (Stream Top 40) | 19 |
| Iceland (Tónlistinn) | 7 |
| Ireland (IRMA) | 34 |
| Italy (FIMI) | 93 |
| Latvia Streaming (LaIPA) | 19 |
| Lithuania (AGATA) | 25 |
| Netherlands (Single Top 100) | 33 |
| New Zealand (Recorded Music NZ) | 24 |
| Norway (IFPI Norge) | 90 |
| Poland (Polish Streaming Top 100) | 45 |
| Portugal (AFP) | 53 |
| Slovakia Singles Digital (ČNS IFPI) | 41 |
| Sweden (Sverigetopplistan) | 45 |
| Switzerland (Schweizer Hitparade) | 39 |
| UK Singles (Official Charts) | 31 |
| US Billboard Hot 100 | 12 |
| US Holiday 100 (Billboard) | 8 |
| US Rolling Stone Top 100 | 5 |

=== Decade-end charts ===
20s Decade-end chart performance
| Chart (2025–2026) | Position |
|---|---|
| Russia Streaming (TopHit) | 170 |

=== Certifications ===
| Region | Certification | Certified units/sales |
|---|---|---|
| Australia (ARIA) | Platinum | 70,000^{‡} |
| Denmark (IFPI Danmark) | Gold | 45,000^{‡} |
| Portugal (AFP) | Gold | 12,000^{‡} |
| United Kingdom (BPI) | Platinum | 600,000^{‡} |
Streaming
| Greece (IFPI Greece) | Gold | 1,000,000^{†} |
^{‡} Sales+streaming figures based on certification alone.^{†} Streaming-only figures based on certification alone.

== Michael Bublé version ==
"It's Beginning to Look a Lot Like Christmas"

Single by Michael Bublé

from the album Christmas
- Released: November 18, 2012
- Recorded: 2011
- Genre: Christmas; traditional pop; jazz
- Length: 3:27
- Label: Reprise
- Songwriter: Meredith Willson

Michael Bublé singles chronology
| "Georgia on My Mind" (2012) | "It's Beginning to Look a Lot Like Christmas" (2012) | "White Christmas" (2012) |

Music video
- "It's Beginning to Look a Lot Like Christmas" on YouTube

Canadian singer Michael Bublé's version was first released on October 24, 2011, as the first track of Bublé's Christmas album. However, it was then re-released as the album's second single on November 18, 2012, achieving greater success. In the UK, the song peaked at number 6 in 2022.

=== Weekly charts ===
| Chart (2011–2026) | Peak position |
|---|---|
| Australia (ARIA) | 3 |
| Austria (Ö3 Austria Top 40) | 6 |
| Belgium (Ultratop 50 Flanders) | 5 |
| Belgium (Ultratop 50 Wallonia) | 9 |
| Canada Hot 100 (Billboard) | 4 |
| CIS Airplay (TopHit) | 128 |
| Croatia International Airplay (Top lista) | 18 |
| Croatia (Billboard) | 12 |
| Czech Republic Singles Digital (ČNS IFPI) | 8 |
| Denmark (Tracklisten) | 7 |
| Estonia Airplay (TopHit) | 28 |
| Finland (Suomen virallinen lista) | 5 |
| France (SNEP) | 8 |
| Germany (GfK) | 5 |
| Global 200 (Billboard) | 6 |
| Greece International Streaming (IFPI) | 6 |
| Hungary (Single Top 40) | 6 |
| Hungary (Stream Top 40) | 2 |
| Iceland (Tónlistinn) | 10 |
| Ireland (IRMA) | 7 |
| Italy (FIMI) | 3 |
| Japan Hot Overseas (Billboard Japan) | 16 |
| Latvia Streaming (LaIPA) | 3 |
| Lithuania (AGATA) | 5 |
| Luxembourg (Billboard) | 4 |
| Netherlands (Single Top 100) | 3 |
| New Zealand (Recorded Music NZ) | 4 |
| Norway (VG-lista) | 2 |
| Philippines Hot 100 (Billboard Philippines) | 65 |
| Poland (Polish Airplay Top 100) | 36 |
| Poland (Polish Streaming Top 100) | 5 |
| Portugal (AFP) | 7 |
| Romania Airplay (TopHit) | 77 |
| Romania (Billboard) | 22 |
| Scottish Singles Sales (Official Charts) | 60 |
| Singapore Streaming (RIAS) | 9 |
| Slovakia Airplay (ČNS IFPI) | 75 |
| Slovakia Singles Digital (ČNS IFPI) | 6 |
| South Africa Streaming (RISA) | 23 |
| South Korea (Circle) | 123 |
| Spain (Promusicae) | 27 |
| Sweden (Sverigetopplistan) | 4 |
| Switzerland (Schweizer Hitparade) | 4 |
| United Arab Emirates Streaming (IFPI) | 9 |
| UK Singles (Official Charts) | 6 |
| US Billboard Hot 100 | 12 |
| US Adult Contemporary (Billboard) | 2 |
| US Hot Christian Songs (Billboard) | 32 |
| US Holiday 100 (Billboard) | 8 |
| US Rolling Stone Top 100 | 19 |
| Vietnam (Vietnam Hot 100) | 90 |

=== Monthly charts ===
Monthly chart performance for "It's Beginning to Look a Lot Like Christmas"
| Chart (2025) | Peak position |
|---|---|
| Estonia Airplay (TopHit) | 40 |

=== Year-end charts ===
| Chart (2020) | Position |
|---|---|
| Hungary (Single Top 40) | 100 |
| Hungary (Stream Top 40) | 71 |

| Chart (2021) | Position |
|---|---|
| Hungary (Single Top 40) | 70 |
| Hungary (Stream Top 40) | 83 |

| Chart (2022) | Position |
|---|---|
| Global 200 (Billboard) | 199 |
| Hungary (Single Top 40) | 70 |
| Hungary (Stream Top 40) | 85 |

| Chart (2023) | Position |
|---|---|
| Hungary (Single Top 40) | 50 |

| Chart (2024) | Position |
|---|---|
| Austria (Ö3 Austria Top 40) | 72 |

| Chart (2025) | Position |
|---|---|
| Germany (GfK) | 92 |

=== Certifications ===
| Region | Certification | Certified units/sales |
|---|---|---|
| Denmark (IFPI Danmark) | 3× Platinum | 270,000^{‡} |
| Germany (BVMI) | 3× Gold | 900,000^{‡} |
| Italy (FIMI) | 2× Platinum | 200,000^{‡} |
| New Zealand (RMNZ) | 3× Platinum | 90,000^{‡} |
| Portugal (AFP) | 2× Platinum | 50,000^{‡} |
| Spain (Promusicae) | Platinum | 40,000^{‡} |
| United Kingdom (BPI) | 4× Platinum | 2,400,000^{‡} |
Streaming
| Greece (IFPI Greece) | Platinum | 2,000,000^{†} |
^{‡} Sales+streaming figures based on certification alone.^{†} Streaming-only figures based on certification alone.

== In popular culture ==
Meredith Willson incorporated the song into his 1963 Broadway musical Here's Love, where it is sung in counterpoint to the newly composed song "Pine Cones and Holly Berries".

Johnny Mathis recorded the song for his 1986 album Christmas Eve with Johnny Mathis; this version gained popularity after its inclusion in the film Home Alone 2: Lost in New York. Gradually, Mathis's recording began to receive wide radio airplay, and in later years this version became a Top 10 Christmas hit.
