= Denny Diante =

American music producer, arranger and engineer

- Occupation: Music producer

Denny Diante is an American music producer, arranger, and engineer. On March 28, 2012, Diante was announced as the president of eMax Media Group. Diante is listed in Billboard Magazine's Encyclopedia of 100 Most Successful Record Producers.

Diante has produced numerous notable artists including B. B. King, Barbra Streisand, Bill Withers, Bobby Brown, Boston, Deniece Williams, Elton John, Glenn Frey, Grateful Dead, Jerry Lee Lewis, John Denver, Johnny Mathis, Julio Iglesias, Maxine Nightingale, Merle Haggard, Neil Diamond, Paul Anka, Sheena Easton, The Oak Ridge Boys, and Tina Turner.
