= Johnny Mathis' All-Time Greatest Hits =

Compilation album by Johnny Mathis
- Released: 1972
- Recorded: 1956–1971
- Genre: AM pop; early pop/rock; vocal pop
- Length: 59:29
- Label: Columbia
- Producer: Ernie Altschuler; Jack Gold; Al Ham; Johnny Mathis; Robert Mersey; Mitch Miller

Johnny Mathis chronology
The First Time Ever (I Saw Your Face) (1972)	Johnny Mathis' All-Time Greatest Hits (1972)	Song Sung Blue (1972)

Professional ratings
Review scores
Source	Rating
Allmusic	4.5/5 stars
Billboard	positive
The Encyclopedia of Popular Music	4/5 stars

Johnny Mathis' All-Time Greatest Hits is a compilation album by American pop singer Johnny Mathis that was released in the spring of 1972 by Columbia Records and, despite its title, overlooks a good number of his Top 40 hits ("No Love (But Your Love)", "Teacher, Teacher", "Call Me", "Someone", "Starbright", "Every Step of the Way") in favor of his singles that did not make the Billboard Hot 100 ("Venus", "Misty Roses", "If We Only Have Love") and album tracks that were not released as singles ("When Sunny Gets Blue", "(Where Do I Begin) Love Story", "My Funny Valentine").

This collection made its first appearance on Billboard magazine's Top LP's & Tapes chart in the issue dated June 24, 1972, and remained there for 15 weeks, peaking at number 141. It received Gold certification from the Recording Industry Association of America on July 9, 1976, and Platinum certification was awarded on November 21, 1986.

== Reception ==
Billboard described the compilation as "a collector's must!"

== Track listing ==
=== Side one ===
1. "A Certain Smile" from A Certain Smile (Sammy Fain, Paul Francis Webster) – 2:47
  - recorded on 5/12/58 and released on 6/2/58; Billboard Hot 100: number 14
2. "When Sunny Gets Blue" (Marvin Fisher, Jack Segal) – 2:41
  - rec. 9/20/56, rel. 11/5/56; B-side of "Wonderful! Wonderful!"
3. "Small World" from Gypsy (Stephen Sondheim, Jule Styne) – 3:18
  - rec. 4/29/59, rel. 5/25/59; Billboard Hot 100: number 20
4. "Misty" (Johnny Burke, Erroll Garner) – 3:34
  - rec. 4/21/59 for his album Heavenly; single rel. 9/59; Billboard Hot 100: number 12
5. "Chances Are" (Robert Allen, Al Stillman) – 3:03
  - rec. 6/16/57, rel. 8/12/57; Most Played by Jockeys: number 1 (1 week)

Personnel

- Al Ham – producer (tracks 1, 2, 4; 5)
- Mitch Miller – producer (tracks 1–4, 5)
- Ray Conniff – arranger, conductor (tracks 2, 5)
- Ray Ellis – arranger, conductor (track 1)
- Glenn Osser – arranger, conductor (tracks 3, 4)

=== Side two ===
1. "Venus" (Ed Marshall) – 2:36
  - rec. for his 1968 album Love Is Blue; Bubbling Under Hot 100 Singles: number 107, Easy Listening: number 23
2. "Maria" from West Side Story (Leonard Bernstein, Stephen Sondheim) – 3:45
  - rec. 11/6/59 for his album Faithfully; single rel. 5/60; Billboard Hot 100: number 78; single rel. 11/61; Billboard Hot 100: number 88
3. "Misty Roses" (Tim Hardin) – 2:39
  - rec. 1967 for his album Up, Up and Away; Easy Listening: number 40
4. "Gina" (Leon Carr, Paul Vance) – 2:46
  - rec. 8/9/62, rel. 9/7/62; Billboard Hot 100: number 6, Easy Listening: number 2
5. "What Will Mary Say" (Eddie Snyder, Paul Vance) – 3:09
  - rec. 8/9/62, rel. 1/4/63; Billboard Hot 100: number 9, Easy Listening: number 3

Personnel

- Ernie Altschuler - producer (tracks 4, 5)
- Robert Mersey - arranger, conductor, producer (tracks 1, 3)
- Mitch Miller – producer (track 2)
- Don Costa - arranger, conductor (tracks 4, 5)
- Glenn Osser - arranger, conductor (track 2)

=== Side three ===
1. "(Where Do I Begin) Love Story" (Francis Lai, Carl Sigman) – 2:46
  - rec. for his 1971 album Love Story
2. "If We Only Have Love" (Eric Blau, Jacques Brel, Mort Shuman) – 3:16
  - rec. 7/8/71, rel. 2/17/72; non-charting single
3. "My Funny Valentine" (Richard Rodgers, Lorenz Hart) – 3:33
  - rec. 1958 for his album Open Fire, Two Guitars
4. "Come to Me" from the Kraft Television Theatre episode "Come to Me" (1957) (Allen, Peter Lind Hayes) – 3:05
  - rec. 10/31/57, rel. 12/30/57; Most Played by Jockeys: number 22
5. "Love Theme from "Romeo and Juliet" (A Time for Us)" from Romeo and Juliet (Larry Kusik, Nino Rota, Eddie Snyder) – 2:58
  - rec. for his 1969 album Love Theme From "Romeo And Juliet" (A Time For Us)

Personnel

- Jack Gold – producer (tracks 1, 5)
- Johnny Mathis – producer (track 2)
- Mitch Miller – producer (tracks 3, 4)
- Perry Botkin, Jr. - arranger, conductor (track 1)
- Ernie Freeman - arranger, conductor (track 5)
- Glenn Osser - arranger, conductor (track 4)
- D'Arneill Pershing – arranger (track 2)
- Roy M. Rogosin – conductor (track 2)
- Al Caiola – guitar (track 3)
- Frank Carroll – bass (track 3)
- Milt Hinton – bass (track 3)
- Tony Mottola – guitar (track 3)

=== Side four ===
1. "Wonderful! Wonderful!" (Sherman Edwards, Ben Raleigh) – 2:50
  - rec. 9/20/56, rel. 11/5/56; Most Played by Jockeys: number 14
2. "All the Time" from Oh, Captain! (Jay Livingston, Ray Evans) – 2:44
  - rec. 1/7/58, rel. 3/17/58; Most Played by Jockeys: number 21
3. "The Twelfth of Never" (Jerry Livingston, Paul Francis Webster) – 2:28
  - rec. 6/16/57, rel. 8/12/57; B-side of "Chances Are"; Most Played by Jockeys: number 9
4. "Wild Is the Wind" from Wild Is the Wind (Dimitri Tiomkin, Ned Washington) – 2:27
  - rec. 10/1/57, rel. 11/11/57; B-side of "No Love (But Your Love)"; Most Played by Jockeys: number 22
5. "It's Not for Me to Say" from Lizzie (Allen, Stillman) – 3:05
  - rec. 9/20/56, rel. 2/25/57; Most Played by Jockeys: number 5

Personnel

- Al Ham – producer (tracks 1, 4, 5; 3)
- Mitch Miller – producer (tracks 1, 4, 5; 2; 3)
- Ray Conniff – arranger, conductor (tracks 1, 5), conductor (track 3)
- Ray Ellis – arranger, conductor (tracks 2, 4)

== Personnel ==
- Johnny Mathis – vocals
- Mort Goode – liner notes
- Anne Garner – cover design
- Beverly Parker – photos
- Jay Flammer – lettering

== Bibliography ==
- Whitburn, Joel (2007), Joel Whitburn Presents Billboard Top Adult Songs, 1961-2006, Record Research Inc., ISBN 0898201691
- Whitburn, Joel (2009), Joel Whitburn's Top Pop Singles, 1955-2008, Record Research Inc., ISBN 0-89820-180-2
- Whitburn, Joel (2010), Joel Whitburn Presents Top Pop Albums, Seventh Edition, Record Research Inc., ISBN 0-89820-183-7
