= Johnny's Greatest Hits =

Greatest hits album by Johnny Mathis
- Released: March 17, 1958
- Recorded: September 20, 1956; June 16, 1957; October 1, 1957; October 31, 1957; January 7, 1958
- Studio: CBS 30th Street Studio; New York City
- Genre: Vocal; pop/rock
- Length: 32:47
- Label: Columbia
- Producer: Mitch Miller; Al Ham^{[A]}

Johnny Mathis chronology
Good Night, Dear Lord (1958)	Johnny's Greatest Hits (1958)	Swing Softly (1958)

Alternate covers
- UK album cover

Alternative cover
- 1977 reissue cover

Professional ratings
Review scores
Source	Rating
AllMusic	link
The Billboard	positive
The Encyclopedia of Popular Music	4/5 stars

Johnny's Greatest Hits is a compilation album by vocalist Johnny Mathis that was released by Columbia Records on March 17, 1958; the album has been described as the "original greatest-hits package". The LP collected all but one of the songs from the first six singles he recorded, including eight A- and B-sides that made the singles charts in The Billboard (now simply known as Billboard magazine) as well as three B-sides that did not chart and one new track ("I Look at You") that was co-written by Mathis but not released as a single.

The album made its debut on the Best Selling Pop LPs chart in the issue of The Billboard dated April 14, 1958, and eventually spent three weeks at number one. It had its last appearance there over 10 years later, in the July 20, 1968, issue, which marked its 490th non-consecutive week there, a record for the most weeks on the magazine's list of the most popular pop albums in the US that it held for 15 years until Pink Floyd's The Dark Side of the Moon reached 491 weeks there in the issue dated October 29, 1983. Johnny's Greatest Hits received gold certification from the Recording Industry Association of America for sales of 500,000 copies in June 1959, and Platinum certification for reaching the one million mark was awarded on November 1, 1999.

The album was initially only available in the monaural format but was reissued in 1962 with a banner added to the original cover that read, "Electronically Re-channeled for Stereo". In 1977, the album was once again reissued, this time with a new jacket design that included a current and much larger headshot of Mathis. This cover was also used for its first release on compact disc in 1988 and as part of a 1995 three-disc set that included his Platinum 1959 album Heavenly and his 1984 concert album Live.

== Reception ==
Robert Christgau insisted that "Wonderful! Wonderful!", "It's Not for Me to Say", "Chances Are", "The Twelfth of Never", and "Wild Is the Wind" "are the substance of Mathis's legend and legacy. Poised on the cusp of black and white, masculine and feminine, they projected an image of egoless tenderness, an irresistible breath of sensuality that infused the airwaves for the second half of 1957 and kept 1958's Johnny's Greatest Hits on the album chart for 490 weeks."

AllMusic's Cub Koda simply proclaimed, "It seldom gets more romantic than this."

== Track listing ==
=== Side one ===
1. "Chances Are" performed with Ray Conniff & His Orchestra (Robert Allen, Al Stillman) – 3:03
  - rec. 6/16/57, rel. 8/12/57; Most Played by Jockeys^{[B]}: #1 (1 week)
2. "All the Time"^{[C]} from the Broadway musical Oh, Captain! (1958); performed with Ray Ellis & His Orchestra (Jay Livingston, Ray Evans) – 2:44
  - rec. 1/7/58, rel. 3/17/58; Most Played by Jockeys: #21
3. "The Twelfth of Never" performed with Ray Conniff & His Orchestra (Jerry Livingston, Paul Francis Webster) – 2:28
  - rec. 6/16/57, rel. 8/12/57; B-side of "Chances Are"; Most Played by Jockeys: #9
4. "When Sunny Gets Blue" performed with Ray Conniff & His Orchestra (Marvin Fisher, Jack Segal) – 2:41
  - rec. 9/20/56, rel. 11/5/56; B-side of "Wonderful! Wonderful!"
5. "When I Am with You" performed with Ray Ellis & His Orchestra (Stillman, Ben Weisman) – 2:58
  - rec. 10/31/57, rel. 12/30/57; B-side of "Come to Me"
6. "Wonderful! Wonderful!" performed with Ray Conniff & His Orchestra & Chorus (Sherman Edwards, Ben Raleigh) – 2:49
  - rec. 9/20/56, rel. 11/5/56; Most Played by Jockeys: #14

=== Side two ===
1. "It's Not for Me to Say" from Lizzie (1957); performed with Ray Conniff & His Orchestra (Allen, Stillman) – 3:05
  - rec. 9/20/56, rel. 2/25/57; Most Played by Jockeys: #5
2. "Come to Me" from the Kraft Television Theatre episode "Come to Me" (1957) (Allen, Peter Lind Hayes) – 3:05
  - rec. 10/31/57, rel. 12/30/57; Most Played by Jockeys: #22
3. "Wild Is the Wind" from Wild Is the Wind (1957); performed with Ray Ellis & His Orchestra (Dimitri Tiomkin, Ned Washington) – 2:27
  - rec. 10/1/57, rel. 11/11/57; B-side of "No Love (But Your Love)"; Most Played by Jockeys: #22
4. "Warm and Tender" from Lizzie (1957); performed with Ray Conniff & His Orchestra (Burt Bacharach, Hal David) – 2:25
  - rec. 9/20/56, rel. 2/25/57; B-side of "It's Not for Me to Say"
5. "No Love (But Your Love)" performed with Ray Conniff & His Orchestra (Billy Myles) – 2:19
  - rec. 6/16/57, rel. 11/11/57; Most Played by Jockeys: #21
6. "I Look at You" performed with Ray Ellis & His Orchestra (Johnny Mathis, Jessie Mae Robinson) – 2:43
  - rec. 1/7/58, rel. 3/17/58
- ^{B} All of the tracks on this compilation were released before Billboard created its Hot 100 chart for tracking song performance.
- ^{C} For the initial release of the album in the UK, "All the Time" was replaced by "Teacher, Teacher", which was included on the US release of More Johnny's Greatest Hits.

== Personnel ==
=== Original album ===
- Mitch Miller – producer
- Al Ham – producer^{[A]}
- Ray Conniff – conductor (except as noted); chorus conductor ("Wonderful! Wonderful!")
- Ray Ellis – conductor ("Wild Is the Wind", "Come to Me", "When I Am with You", "All the Time", "I Look at You")
- Normand Menard – photograph

=== 1977 reissue ===
- Rose F. Ricciardella – liner notes
- Richard Noble – photography
- Andy Engel – design
- ^{A} Neither the original singles nor the liner notes for any of the releases of this compilation provided producer credits, but other compilations have. While all of these other releases acknowledge Mitch Miller as a producer on all of the tracks included here, the ones that credit Al Ham as an additional producer on certain songs disagree on which ones those are. The 2006 collection Gold: A 50th Anniversary Celebration only recognizes Ham as producer on "Wonderful! Wonderful!", "When Sunny Gets Blue", "It's Not for Me to Say", and "Wild Is the Wind", but the 2004 collection The Essential Johnny Mathis also credits him in this capacity on "Chances Are", "The Twelfth of Never", and "No Love (But Your Love)".

== Bibliography ==
- Whitburn, Joel (2009), Joel Whitburn's Top Pop Singles, 1955-2008, Record Research Inc., ISBN 0898201802
- Whitburn, Joel (2010), Joel Whitburn Presents Top Pop Albums, Seventh Edition, Record Research Inc., ISBN 0-89820-183-7
