= The Singles (Johnny Mathis album) =

Box set by Johnny Mathis
- Released: September 25, 2015
- Recorded: 1956–1981
- Genres: Vocal; stage & screen; R&B; pop/rock; easy listening
- Length: 4:19:12
- Label: Columbia/Legacy

Johnny Mathis chronology
The Complete Global Albums Collection (2014)	The Singles (2015)	The Complete Christmas Collection 1958–2010 (2015)

Professional ratings
Review scores
Source	Rating
Allmusic	4/5 stars
The Second Disc	Positive

The Singles is a four-disc box set by the American pop singer Johnny Mathis that was released in 2015 by Columbia Records to commemorate the singer's 80th birthday. In his review of the collection Joe Marchese explains that it "doesn't bring together every track released by the legendary artist on 45 RPM; such an endeavor would take far more than four discs. Instead, it features the tracks originally released by Mathis on Columbia in the singles format – in other words, non-LP sides – between the years of 1956 and 1981, in their original single mixes." His description of the compilation echoes that of the compilation's producer Didier C. Deutsch in the liner notes as explanation for the exclusion of the hit singles "Misty" from Heavenly (1959) and his "Too Much, Too Little, Too Late" duet with Deniece Williams from You Light Up My Life (1978). Deutsch excuses these as "songs extracted from specific albums to call attention to these albums." The set does, however, include "Ten Times Forever More" and "I Was There" from his 1971 LP, Love Story, and a shorter version of "If We Only Have Love" than the one that was included on his other 1971 album, You've Got a Friend.

== Critical reception ==
Stephen Thomas Erlewine of Allmusic wrote that "the first two discs contain the music that crystallized Johnny Mathis' appeal: he made the middle of the road seem fresh and if Mitch Miller's productions grow wearisome, Mathis' voice never does". The Second Disc's Joe Marchese argued that "this assemblage of hits and rarities belongs on the shelf of every fan of Johnny Mathis – which is to say of any fan of immaculate vocals, impeccable musicianship, and the full spectrum of American popular song."

== Track listing ==
Recording dates and information taken from the liner notes.

=== Disc one ===
1. "Wonderful! Wonderful!" (Sherman Edwards, Ben Raleigh) – 2:50
2. "When Sunny Gets Blue" performed with Ray Conniff & His Orchestra (Marvin Fisher, Jack Segal) – 2:41
  - above two recorded on September 20, 1956, and released on November 5, 1956
3. "It's Not for Me to Say" from Lizzie (1957); performed with Ray Conniff & His Orchestra (Robert Allen, Al Stillman) – 3:05
4. "Warm and Tender" from Lizzie (1957); performed with Ray Conniff & His Orchestra (Burt Bacharach, Hal David) – 2:23
  - above two rec. September 20, 1956, rel. February 25, 1957
5. "Chances Are" performed with Ray Conniff & His Orchestra (Robert Allen, Al Stillman) – 3:03
6. "The Twelfth of Never" performed with Ray Conniff & His Orchestra (Jerry Livingston, Paul Francis Webster) – 2:28
  - above two rec. June 16, 1957, rel. August 12, 1957
7. "Wild Is the Wind" from Wild Is the Wind (1957) (Dimitri Tiomkin, Ned Washington) – 2:26
  - rec. October 1, 1957, rel. November 11, 1957
8. "No Love (But Your Love)" performed with Ray Conniff & His Orchestra (Billy Myles) – 2:34
  - rec. June 16, 1957, rel. November 11, 1957
9. "When I Am with You" (Al Stillman, Ben Weisman) – 3:15
10. "Come to Me" from the Kraft Television Theatre episode "Come to Me" (1957) (Robert Allen, Peter Lind Hayes) – 3:21
  - above two rec. October 31, 1957, rel. December 30, 1957
11. "All the Time" (Ray Evans, Jay Livingston) – 2:44
  - rec. January 7, 1958, rel. March 17, 1958
12. "Teacher, Teacher" (Robert Allen, Al Stillman) – 2:38
  - rec. October 31, 1957, rel. March 17, 1958
13. "A Certain Smile" from A Certain Smile (1958) (Sammy Fain, Paul Francis Webster) – 2:47
  - rec. May 12, 1958, rel. June 2, 1958
14. "Let It Rain" (Al Frisch, Sid Wayne) – 2:38
  - rec. January 7, 1958, rel. June 2, 1958
15. "Call Me" (Belford Hendricks, Clyde Otis) – 2:46
16. "Stairway to the Sea (Scalinatella)" (Albert Beach, Giuseppe Cioffi ) – 2:34
  - above two rec. May 12, 1958, rel. September 8, 1958
17. "You Are Beautiful" from Flower Drum Song (1958) (Oscar Hammerstein II, Richard Rodgers) – 3:10
  - rec. November 10, 1958, rel. December 1, 1958
18. "Let's Love" (Richard Ferraris, Norman Kaye) – 2:41
  - rec. September 26, 1958, rel. December 1, 1958
19. "Someone" (William J. Tennyson, Jr.) – 2:58
  - rec. September 26, 1958, rel. March 9, 1959
20. "Very Much in Love" (Ray Ellis, Al Stillman) – 2:46
  - rec. November 10, 1958, rel. March 9, 1959
21. "I Look at You" (Johnny Mathis, Jessie Mae Robinson) – 2:59
  - CD bonus track from Johnny's Greatest Hits; rec. January 7, 1958, rel. March 17, 1958
22. "The Flame of Love" (Lee Pockriss, Paul Vance) – 2:51
  - CD bonus track from More Johnny's Greatest Hits; rec. April 29, 1959, rel. June 22, 1959

Personnel

- Mitch Miller – producer (tracks 1–21)
- Al Ham – producer^{[A]} (tracks 1–3, 7, 13; 5, 6, 8, 12; 18, 19, 22)
- Ray Conniff – conductor (tracks 1–6, 8); chorus conductor (track 1)
- Ray Ellis – conductor (tracks 7, 9–21)
- Glenn Osser – conductor (track 22)
- ^{A} While this compilation only credits Ham as producer for tracks 18, 19, and 22 on this disc, the other compilations listed in the References section credit him as such on the tracks indicated. Neither the original singles nor the compilations released before these provided this information.

=== Disc two ===
1. "Small World" from Gypsy (1959) (Stephen Sondheim, Jule Styne) – 3:18
  - rec. April 29, 1959, rel. May 25, 1959
2. "You Are Everything to Me" (Percy Faith, Carl Sigman) – 2:56
  - rec. November 10, 1958, rel. May 25, 1959
3. "The Story of Our Love" (Michael Colicchio, Anthony Piano) – 2:24
  - rec. April 29, 1959, rel. September 14, 1959
4. "The Best of Everything" from The Best of Everything (1959) (Sammy Cahn, Alfred Newman) – 2:45
  - rec. September 8, 1959, rel. September 28, 1959
5. "Cherie" (Michael Coldin, Tony Prescott) – 2:49
  - rec. May 1, 1959, rel. September 28, 1959
6. "Starbright" (Lee Pockriss, Paul Vance) – 2:48
  - rec. April 29, 1959, rel. February 15, 1960
7. "All Is Well" (Jerry Leiber, Mike Stoller) – 2:31
  - rec. May 1, 1959, rel. February 15, 1960
8. "Hey Love" (Lee Pockriss, Paul Vance) – 2:28
  - rec. May 1, 1959, rel. May 9, 1960
9. "My Love for You" (Abner Silver, Sid Wayne) – 3:07
10. "Oh That Feeling" (Jack Segal, Paul Vance) – 2:36
  - above two rec. May 31, 1960, rel. July 25, 1960
11. "How to Handle a Woman" from Camelot (1960); performed with Percy Faith & His Orchestra (Alan Jay Lerner, Frederick Loewe) – 3:02
  - rec. October 27, 1960, rel. November 7, 1960
12. "While You're Young" (Barbara Hayden, Tony Romano) – 2:54
  - rec. May 1, 1959, rel. November 7, 1960
13. "You Set My Heart to Music" from 13 Daughters (1961) (Eaton Magoon, Jr.) – 2:46
  - rec. March 4, 1961, rel. March 20, 1961
14. "Jenny" (Jack Segal, Paul Vance) – 2:58
  - rec. February 8, 1961, rel. March 20, 1961
15. "Should I Wait (Or Should I Run to Her)" (Leon Carr, Paul Vance) – 2:48
  - rec. February 8, 1961, rel. April 24, 1961
16. "Laurie, My Love" (Jerry Livingston, Paul Francis Webster) – 2:25
  - rec. March 4, 1961, rel. June 16, 1961
17. "Wasn't the Summer Short?" (Ruth Lyons) – 2:53
  - rec. February 8, 1961, rel. September 8, 1961
18. "There You Are" (Clyde Otis, Chris Towns) – 2:48
  - rec. September 26, 1958, rel. September 8, 1961
19. "My Kind of Christmas" performed with Percy Faith & His Orchestra (Jerry Livingston, Paul Francis Webster) – 3:02
20. "Christmas Eve" performed with Percy Faith & His Orchestra (Allyn Ferguson, Sidney Shaw) – 2:56
  - above two rec. September 11, 1961, rel. September 17, 1961
21. "Sweet Thursday" (Jerry Livingston, Paul Francis Webster) – 2:30
22. "One Look" (Arthur Hamilton) – 2:52
  - above two rec. October 9, 1961, rel. December 29, 1961
23. "Marianna" from The Counterfeit Traitor (1962) (Alfred Newman, Paul Francis Webster) – 2:50
  - rec. March 29, 1962, rel. April 27, 1962
24. "Unaccustomed As I Am" (Ray Ellis, Al Stillman) – 2:55
  - rec. March 4, 1961, rel. April 27, 1962
25. "That's the Way It Is" (Leon Carr, Paul Vance) – 2:49
  - rec. March 29, 1962, rel. July 27, 1962

Personnel

- Al Ham – producer (tracks 1–8, 18)
- Mitch Miller – producer (tracks 9–12, 18)
- Frank DeVol – producer (tracks 13, 16, 24)
- Irving Townsend – producer (tracks 14, 15, 17, 19–23, 25)
- Glenn Osser – conductor (tracks 1, 3, 4, 6, 7, 9, 10)
- Ray Ellis – conductor (tracks 2, 13–18, 24)
- Ralph Burns – conductor (tracks 5, 8, 12)
- Percy Faith – conductor (tracks 11, 19, 20)
- Pete King – conductor (tracks 23, 25)
- no conductor is indicated for tracks 21 & 22

=== Disc three ===
1. "I'll Never Be Lonely Again" (Sherman Edwards, Aaron Schroeder) – 3:08
  - rec. May 23, 1960, rel. July 27, 1962
2. "Gina" (Leon Carr, Paul Vance) – 2:46
  - rec. August 9, 1962, rel. September 7, 1962
3. "I Love Her That's Why" (Jack Segal, Paul Vance) – 2:27
  - rec. October 9, 1961, rel. September 7, 1962
4. "What Will Mary Say" (Eddie Snyder, Paul Vance) – 3:09
  - rec. August 9, 1962, rel. January 4, 1963
5. "Quiet Girl" (Marvin Fisher, Jack Segal) – 2:56
  - rec. October 9, 1961, rel. January 4, 1963
6. "Every Step of the Way" (Robert Allen, Al Stillman) – 3:21
  - rec. May 31, 1960, rel. May 7, 1963
7. "Sooner or Later" (Thomas Garlock, Alan Jeffreys) – 3:15
  - rec. August 9, 1962, rel. July 30, 1963
8. "I'll Search My Heart" (Allyn Ferguson, Ernie Richman, Neil Westen) – 3:02
  - rec. August 9, 1962, rel. November 5, 1963
9. "All the Sad Young Men" (Jerry Livingston, Paul Francis Webster) – 3:02
  - rec. March 29, 1962, rel. November 5, 1963
10. "Don't Talk to Me" (Milt Gabler, Bert Kaempfert, Herbert Rehbein) – 3:11
  - rec. May 15, 1967, rel. August 15, 1967
11. "Among the First to Know" (Fred Haber) – 2:57
  - rec. November 2, 1967, rel. November 29, 1967
12. "Long Winter Nights" (Gene Allan, Ron Dante, Bob Feldman) – 2:35
  - rec. October 20, 1967, rel. November 29, 1967
13. "Night Dreams" (Bert Kaempfert, Herbert Rehbein, Charles Singleton) – 2:49
  - rec. July 5, 1968, rel. September 3, 1968
14. "Whoever You Are, I Love You" from Promises, Promises (1968) (Burt Bacharach, Hal David) – 3:59
  - rec. January 18, 1969, rel. April 8, 1969
15. "For All We Know" (J. Fred Coots, Sam M. Lewis) – 3:00
  - rec. January 6, 1970, rel. February 11, 1970
16. "Wherefore and Why" (Gordon Lightfoot) – 3:23
17. "The Last Time I Saw Her" (Gordon Lightfoot) – 5:12
  - above two rec. March 25, 1970, rel. June 1, 1970
18. "Darling Lili" from Darling Lili (1970) (Henry Mancini, Johnny Mercer) – 2:52
  - rec. July 10, 1970, rel. August 14, 1970
19. "Sign of the Dove" (Bradford Craig) – 2:49
20. "Christmas Is..." (Percy Faith, Spence Maxwell) – 3:06
  - above two rec. October 30, 1970, rel. November 23, 1970
21. "Ten Times Forever More" (Burt Bacharach, Hal David) – 2:36
  - rec. January 4, 1971, rel. January 21, 1971

Personnel

- Mitch Miller – producer (tracks 1, 6)
- Ernie Altschuler – producer (tracks 2, 4, 7, 8)
- Irving Townsend – producer (tracks 3, 5, 9)
- Robert Mersey – producer, conductor (tracks 10–14)
- Jack Gold – producer (tracks 15–21)
- Ralph Burns – conductor (track 1)
- Don Costa – conductor (tracks 2, 4, 7, 8)
- Allyn Ferguson – conductor (tracks 3, 5)
- Glenn Osser – conductor (track 6)
- Pete King – conductor (track 9)
- Ernie Freeman – conductor (tracks 15, 18–20)
- Perry Botkin, Jr. – conductor (tracks 16, 17, 21)

=== Disc four ===
1. "I Was There" (Gerry Goffin, Carole King) – 2:26
  - rec. January 18, 1969, rel. January 21, 1971
2. "Evie" (Jimmy Webb) – 3:09
3. "Think About Things" (Artie Butler, Jerry Fuller) – 2:56
  - above two rec. March 19, 1971, rel. April 15, 1971
4. "If We Only Have Love" (Eric Blau, Jacques Brel, Mort Shuman) – 2:45
  - rec. July 8, 1971, rel. February 17, 1972
5. "This Way Mary" from Mary, Queen of Scots (1971) (Don Black, John Barry) – 3:13
  - rec. January 27, 1972, rel. February 17, 1972
6. "Sometimes" (Felice Mancini, Henry Mancini) – 3:02
  - rec. February 11, 1972, rel. June 16, 1972
7. "I" (Jerry Fuller, D'Arneill Pershing) – 3:05
  - rec. September 1972, rel. October 27, 1972
8. "Take Good Care of Her" (Arthur Kent, Ed Warren) – 3:01
9. "Walking Tall" from Walking Tall (1973) (Don Black, Walter Scharf) – 3:34
  - above two rec. December 19, 1972, rel. January 19, 1973
10. "Turn the Lights Down" (Jerry Fuller, Richard Littlefield) – 4:13
  - rec. September 22, 1976, rel. November 9, 1976
11. "Christmas in the City of the Angels" (Suzy Elman; Arnold Goland; Jack Gold) – 2:50
12. "The Very First Christmas Day" (Clark Gassman, Molly-Ann Leikin) – 3:07
  - above two rec. June 5, 1979, rel. November 8, 1979
13. "The Lord's Prayer" performed with Gladys Knight & the Pips (Albert Hay Malotte) – 3:26
  - rec. May 21, 1979, rel. November 18, 1980
14. "When a Child Is Born" performed with Gladys Knight & the Pips (Ciro Dammicco, Fred Jay) – 3:52
  - rec. April 23, 1979, rel. November 18, 1980
15. "Nothing Between Us But Love" (Ray Parker Jr., Candy Parton) – 3:21
  - Single A-Side also included on The First 25 Years – The Silver Anniversary Album; rec. November 26, 1980, rel. June 19, 1981
16. "It Doesn't Have to Hurt Every Time" (Jim Andron, Candy Parton) – 3:41
  - CD bonus track from The First 25 Years – The Silver Anniversary Album; rec. January 18, 1981, rel. June 19, 1981
17. "There! I've Said It Again" (Redd Evans, David Mann) – 2:46
  - CD bonus track from The First 25 Years – The Silver Anniversary Album; rec. November 26, 1980, rel. June 19, 1981
18. "Three Times a Lady" (Lionel Richie) – 4:15
  - CD bonus track from The First 25 Years – The Silver Anniversary Album; rec. March 5, 1980, rel. June 19, 1981
19. "The Way You Look Tonight" from Swing Time (1936) (Dorothy Fields, Jerome Kern) – 3:17
  - CD bonus track from The First 25 Years – The Silver Anniversary Album; rec. November 26, 1980, rel. June 19, 1981

Personnel

- Robert Mersey – producer, conductor (track 1)
- Jerry Fuller – producer (tracks 2, 3, 5–10)
- Jack Gold – producer (tracks 4, 11–19)
- Al Capps – conductor (tracks 2, 3, 5)
- D'Arneill Pershing – conductor (tracks 4, 6–9)
- Gene Page – conductor (tracks 10–19)

== Additional personnel ==
Box set credits taken from the liner notes.

=== Singles ===
- Johnny Mathis – vocals

=== Box set ===
- Didier C. Deutsch – producer; liner notes
- Mike Piacentini – producer; mastering
- Jeff James – project A&R
- Jim Lane – project director
- Will McKinney – project director
- Frank Harkins – art direction
- Alice V. Butts – design
- Sony Music Photo Archives – photography
- Johnny Mathis – liner notes

- Mastered at Battery Studios, New York City
