= The Music of Johnny Mathis: A Personal Collection =

Box set by Johnny Mathis
- Released: 1993
- Recorded: 1956–1992
- Genres: Vocal; R&B; stage & screen pop/rock
- Length: 5:01:53
- Label: Columbia

Johnny Mathis chronology
| The Christmas Music of Johnny Mathis: A Personal Collection (1993) | The Music of Johnny Mathis: A Personal Collection (1993) | The Hits of Johnny Mathis (1995) |

Alternate cover
- 2001 reissue cover

Professional ratings
Review scores
| Source | Rating |
|---|---|
| Allmusic | 4.5/5 stars |
| People | positive |

The Music of Johnny Mathis: A Personal Collection is a box set by American pop singer Johnny Mathis that was released in 1993 by Columbia Records and gave an overview of his career with four CDs containing 86 tracks that he selected himself. In the liner notes he wrote that his "undying gratitude is really to the lyricists and composers of all these memorable songs. Without the words and music I have sung over the years, my career as a singer would not have existed. My thanks is always to these special and gifted people."

The collection included three tracks that were previously unreleased: "Baía (Na Baixa do Sapateiro)", which was recorded for but not included on his 1986 Henry Mancini collaboration The Hollywood Musicals, and two songs from an unreleased album by Sergio Mendes, "Photograph" and "The Island". The two other rarities here are "Evie", a 1971 single that was not included on any of his studio albums, and "El Amar y el Querer", a track from his 1983 CBS Discos album Cuando Vuelvas A Casa.

The original release came in an oblong box, while the 2001 reissue was repackaged with a cardboard slipcase to fit the original 96-page booklet alongside a 4-CD jewel case.

== Reception ==
AllMusic's Greg Adams noted the difference between this Mathis compilation and any of his greatest hits collections: "These melodically and lyrically sophisticated songs better demonstrate Mathis's superlative vocal abilities than many of the chart-bound pop songs the box set omits."

The review in People magazine discussed his place in popular culture: "This 86-song lovefest suggests why Mathis has often been blamed for the last 10 years of the baby boom. If you aren't a fan, this set will make clear why he and his songs are survivors."

== Track listing ==
Disc 1

1. "When Sunny Gets Blue" (Marvin Fisher, Jack Segal) – 2:41
2. "It's Not for Me to Say" (Robert Allen, Al Stillman) – 3:05
3. "Wonderful! Wonderful!" (Sherman Edwards, Ben Raleigh) – 2:50
4. "In the Wee Small Hours of the Morning" (Bob Hilliard, David Mann) – 3:16
5. "It Could Happen to You" (Johnny Burke, Jimmy Van Heusen) – 3:48
6. "All Through the Night" (Cole Porter) – 2:58
7. "Chances Are" (Robert Allen, Al Stillman) – 3:03
8. "The Twelfth of Never" (Jerry Livingston, Paul Francis Webster) – 2:28
9. "Wild Is the Wind" (Dimitri Tiomkin, Ned Washington) – 2:26
10. "There Goes My Heart" (Benny Davis, Abner Silver) – 3:43
11. "What'll I Do" (Irving Berlin) – 2:55
12. "I've Grown Accustomed To Her Face" (Alan Jay Lerner, Frederick Loewe) – 3:29
13. "By Myself" (Howard Dietz, Arthur Schwartz) – 4:09
14. "Warm" (Sid Jacobson, Jimmy Krondes) – 3:24
15. "When I Am with You" (stereo version) (Al Stillman, Ben Weisman) – 2:59
16. "I Heard a Forest Praying" (Peter DeRose, Sam M. Lewis) – 3:13
17. "I Look at You" (stereo version) (Johnny Mathis, Jessie Mae Robinson) – 2:59
18. "A Certain Smile" (Sammy Fain, Paul Francis Webster) – 2:47
19. "Someone" (William J. Tennyson, Jr.) – 2:58
20. "You'll Never Know" (Mack Gordon, Harry Warren) - 4:09
21. "More Than You Know" (Edward Eliscu, Billy Rose, Vincent Youmans) – 4:19
22. "Moonlight Becomes You" (Burke, Van Heusen) – 4:07
23. "Heavenly" (Burt Bacharach, Sidney Shaw) – 3:23

Disc 2

1. "A Ride on a Rainbow" (Leo Robin, Jule Styne) – 4:11
2. "A Lovely Way to Spend an Evening" (Harold Adamson, Jimmy McHugh) – 4:05
3. "Misty" (Burke, Erroll Garner) – 3:34
4. "Small World" (Stephen Sondheim, Jule Styne) – 3:18
5. "The Best of Everything" (Sammy Cahn, Alfred Newman) – 2:45
6. "Maria" (Leonard Bernstein, Stephen Sondheim) – 3:45
7. "Tonight" (Bernstein, Sondheim) – 3:16
8. "Isn't It a Pity?" (George Gershwin, Ira Gershwin) – 3:59
9. "I Married an Angel" (Lorenz Hart, Richard Rodgers) – 3:52
10. "Spring Is Here" (Hart, Rodgers) – 3:53
11. "Don't Blame Me" (Dorothy Fields, McHugh) – 4:43
12. "Stairway to the Stars" (Matty Malneck, Mitchell Parish, Frank Signorelli) – 4:54
13. "Love Look Away" (Oscar Hammerstein II, Rodgers) – 3:31
14. "Smile" (Charlie Chaplin, Geoffrey Claremont Parsons, John Turner) – 3:18
15. "You Set My Heart to Music" (Eaton Magoon, Jr.) – 2:46
16. "Gina" (Leon Carr, Paul Vance) – 2:46
17. "What Will Mary Say" (Eddie Snyder, Paul Vance) – 3:09
18. "Laura" (Johnny Mercer, David Raksin) – 4:40
19. "Long Ago (and Far Away)" (I. Gershwin, Jerome Kern) – 3:48
20. "Clopin Clopant (Comme Ci, Comme Ca)" (Bruno Coquatrix, Pierre Dudan, Alex Kramer, Joan Whitney) – 3:41
21. "I'm in Love for the Very First Time" (Wally Ridley, Paddy Roberts) – 3:21

Disc 3

1. "Love Theme from Romeo and Juliet (A Time for Us)" (Larry Kusik, Nino Rota, Eddie Snyder) – 2:58
2. "Live for Life" (Norman Gimbel, Francis Lai) – 2:59
3. "A Man and a Woman" (Pierre Barouh, Jerry Keller, Lai) – 3:26
4. "Evie" (Jimmy Webb) – 3:09
5. "If" (David Gates) – 3:03
6. "Theme from Summer of 42 (The Summer Knows)" (Alan and Marilyn Bergman, Michel Legrand) – 2:39
7. "Love Theme from The Godfather (Speak Softly Love)" (Larry Kusik, Nino Rota) – 3:08
8. "Betcha by Golly, Wow" (Thom Bell, Linda Creed) – 2:49
9. "Happy (Love Theme from Lady Sings the Blues)" (Legrand, Smokey Robinson) – 3:36
10. "Arianne" (Martin Charnin, Christian Roudey) – 3:29
11. "I'm Coming Home" (Thom Bell, Linda Creed) – 3:24
12. "And I Think That's What I'll Do" (Bell, Creed) – 3:41
13. "Life Is a Song Worth Singing" (Bell, Creed) – 6:06
14. Medley – 4:06
  a. "Let Me Be the One" (Roger Nichols, Paul Williams)
  b. "I Won't Last a Day Without You" (Nichols, Williams)
15. "One Day in Your Life" (Renée Armand, Samuel F. Brown III) – 4:14
16. "Feelings" (Morris Albert, Loulou Gasté) – 3:28
17. "Yellow Roses on Her Gown" (Michael Moore) – 4:33
18. "When a Child Is Born" (Ciro Dammicco, Fred Jay) – 3:41
19. "All the Things You Are" (Oscar Hammerstein II, Jerome Kern) – 3:33
20. "We're All Alone" (Boz Scaggs) – 3:22
21. "One" (Marvin Hamlisch, Edward Kleban) – 2:26
22. "Too Much, Too Little, Too Late" performed with Deniece Williams (Nat Kipner, John Vallins) – 2:59

Disc 4

1. "The Last Time I Felt Like This" performed with Jane Olivor (A. Bergman, M. Bergman, Marvin Hamlisch) – 2:57
2. "Love" (Gerard Kenny, Drey Shepperd) – 3:48
3. "With You I'm Born Again" (Carol Connors, David Shire) – 4:03
4. "Warm" (David Buskin) – 4:39
5. "Friends in Love" performed with Dionne Warwick (Bill Champlin, David Foster, Jay Graydon) – 4:03
6. "El Amar y el Querer" (Manuel Alejandro, Ana Magdalena) – 4:13
7. "Love Won't Let Me Wait" performed with Deniece Williams (Vinnie Barrett, Bobby Eli) – 4:16
8. "99 Miles from L.A." (live version) (Hal David, Albert Hammond) – 3:35
9. "I Had the Craziest Dream" (Gordon, Harry Warren) – 3:05
10. "Baía (Na Baixa do Sapateiro)" (Ary Barroso, Ray Gilbert) – 4:13
11. "Toyland" (Glen MacDonough, Victor Herbert) – 3:41
12. "I'm on the Outside Looking In" (Teddy Randazzo, Bobby Weinstein) – 3:24
13. "It's All in the Game" performed with Take 6 (Charles Dawes, Carl Sigman) – 2:33
14. "You Belong to Me" (Pee Wee King, Chilton Price, Redd Stewart) – 3:40
15. "All Alone Am I" (Arthur Altman, Manos Hadjidakis) – 3:24
16. "Photograph" (Dori Caymmi) – 4:35
17. "The Island" (A. Bergman, M. Bergman, Ivan Lins, Vítor Martins) – 4:03
18. "Something to Live For" (Duke Ellington, Billy Strayhorn) – 3:37
19. "Prelude to a Kiss" (Ellington, Irving Gordon, Irving Mills) – 2:52
20. Medley performed with Barbra Streisand – 4:43
  a. "I Have a Love" (Leonard Bernstein, Stephen Sondheim)
  b. "One Hand, One Heart" (Bernstein, Sondheim)

== Personnel ==
- Johnny Mathis – vocals

Compilation

- Mike Berniker – executive producer
- Jerry Shulman – executive producer
- Didier C. Deutsch – producer
- Mark Wilder – digital remixing and remastering
- Chris Herles – digital remixing and remastering
- Adam Block – project director
- Allen Weinberg – art direction and design
- Paul M. Martin – design assistance
- Hope Chasin – packaging manager
- Charlie Sarrica – graphic arts production manager
- Tony Natelli – project consultant
- Todd Everett – liner notes
- Gene Lees – liner notes
- David Vance – photography
- Maria Niemela – photography
- Don Hunstein – photography
- Digitally remixed and remastered at Sony Music Studios, New York
