= When Sunny Gets Blue =

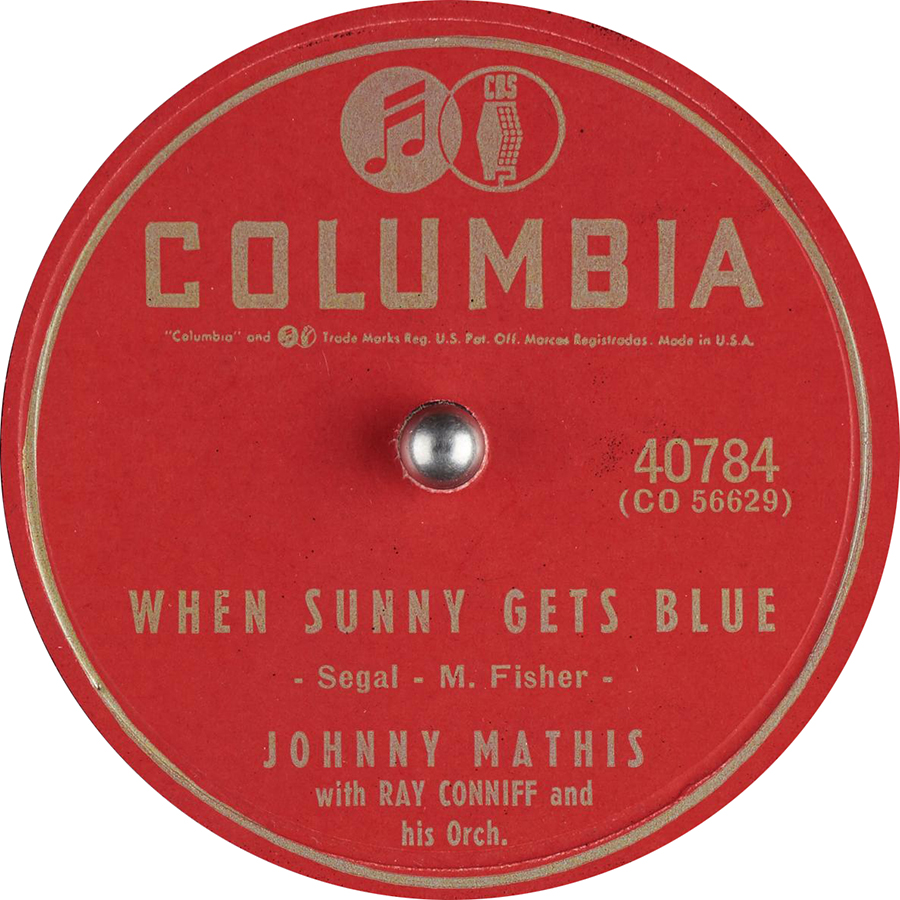

Single by Johnny Mathis and Ray Conniff and his Orchestra

from the album Johnny's Greatest Hits
- A-side: "Wonderful! Wonderful!"
- Released: November 5, 1956
- Recorded: September 21, 1956
- Studio: Columbia 30th Street Studio, New York City
- Genre: Vocal pop, jazz
- Length: 2:34
- Label: Columbia
- Songwriter(s): Marvin Fisher; Jack Segal
- Producer(s): Al Ham; Mitch Miller

Johnny Mathis singles chronology
"When Sunny Gets Blue" (1956)	"It's Not for Me to Say" (1957)

Music video
- "When Sunny Gets Blue" on YouTube

"When Sunny Gets Blue" is a jazz standard with music by Marvin Fisher and lyrics by Jack Segal. The song was originally recorded in 1956 by Johnny Mathis backed by Ray Conniff and his Orchestra and released as the B-side of Mathis's debut single "Wonderful! Wonderful!". "When Sunny Gets Blue" was included on the compilation album Johnny's Greatest Hits, released in April 1958.

== Background and release ==
Johnny Mathis was billed as a jazz singer on his debut album, which was released by Columbia Records in 1956. In the liner notes for his 1993 box set The Music of Johnny Mathis: A Personal Collection, Mathis is quoted as saying that the head of A&R at Columbia, Mitch Miller, "hated what I was singing, and he hated the way I was singing it." Miller wanted to teach him to sing using the "choirboy quality in his voice". He gave Mathis a stack of demos and sheet music from which he was to select four songs for a recording session on September 21, 1956, with Miller and Al Ham producing. (Note: Neither the original 45 and 78 rpm singles nor the liner notes for Johnny's Greatest Hits provided producer credits, but other compilations have. The Essential Johnny Mathis, Gold: A 50th Anniversary Celebration and The Singles acknowledge Mitch Miller as a producer, but The Essential Johnny Mathis and Gold: A 50th Anniversary Celebration also credit Al Ham as a producer on this song.) Two of his selections, "Wonderful! Wonderful!" and "When Sunny Gets Blue", were released as his first single on November 5.

== Critical reception ==
=== Original recording ===
Cashbox magazine gave letter grades to both sides of the single in its review. "When Sunny Gets Blue" received a B+ (meaning excellent): "Johnny Mathis, a talented youngster with a wistful, romantic, voice, lends his beautiful technique to this tender love story and comes up with a most pleasant side. Pretty performance."

=== Cover versions ===
On December 28, 1956, Nat King Cole recorded it for his album Love Is the Thing, with this rendition praised by music critic Will Friedwald as displaying Cole's "tenderness, compassion and empathy".

Stanley Green of Stereo Review commended Nancy Wilson's rendition on her 1962 album Hello Young Lovers.

Various versions of "When Sunny Gets Blue" have been singled out by the editors of Billboard in reviews of singles or the albums on which the song appeared. The George Shearing Trio's version on their 1962 album Jazz Moments was described as "richly harmonized". Jeanne Lee and Ran Blake's recording was described as one of "the better tracks" from their 1962 album The Newest Sound Around. Regarding Joe Harnell's version, released as a single in 1965, they wrote, "First-rate piano work and bossa nova-flavored arrangement of the standard." In their review of Steve Miller's 1988 album Born 2 B Blue, they described his rendition as "smooth". Lillian Boutté's recording from her 1996 album But… Beautiful was "enjoyable". Michele Rosewoman's version on her 1996 album Spirit was described as a "playfully progressive reconstitution".

Cashbox also highlighted recordings of "When Sunny Gets Blue" in various reviews. Regarding Blossom Dearie's version on her 1964 album May I Come In?, the editors singled it out as one of the songs on which her "high-pitched jazz-styled bluesy voice has lost none of its distinctive luster". As the B-side of Carmen McRae's 1964 single "Cutie Pants", "When Sunny Gets Blue" received a B+ (Very Good) with the comment, "Potent blues reading for late night spinners." Reviewing Gene Shaw's 1964 album Debut in Blue, they wrote, "Jazzophiles will dig these ultra-modern sounds, especially… 'When Sunny Gets Blue'." In their review of Junior Mance's 1967 album The Good Life, they described the song as "groovy". Regarding Eddie "Lockjaw" Davis's 1968 album Love Calls, they wrote, "Smooth and mellow sax treatments of tunes like 'When Sunny Gets Blue' [and others] make for an easy going package of 'mood music' particularly suited to those moods befalling couples late at night." When Kenny Rankin's 1977 recording was released as a single, they wrote, "Considering the high-pitched, reedy quality of both their singing voices, a song that was performed by Johnny Mathis is an appropriate choice for Kenny Rankin. With lush orchestration by Don Costa, Rankin's vocal skips along in jazzy intervals."

AllMusic critics have commented in retrospective reviews on various versions of the song. Scott Yanow critiqued the June Christy album Fair and Warmer!, which was recorded in January 1957, and noted that "When Sunny Gets Blue" was one of the highlights. Regarding Dakota Staton's version on her 1958 album Dynamic!, Yanow wrote that she "puts plenty of feeling into" the song. Stephen Cook found Jimmy Heath's rendition to be an "attractive cover" on 1961's The Quota. He also reviewed the 1966 album This Is Criss!, writing that Sonny Criss "makes fine work of such rare-bird covers as … 'When Sunny Gets Blue'." Regarding Anita O'Day's 1961 album Waiter, Make Mine Blues, Jason Ankeny felt that "songs like … 'When Sunny Gets Blue' capture O'Day at her most affecting, balancing her trademark sophistication with the world-weary resignation of one who has loved and lost." John Bush reviewed Sarah Vaughan's 1962 album Sarah + 2, commenting, "Her best feature is 'When Sunny Gets Blue,' a spotlight for her dynamic range." Yanow noted the song as a highlight on the George Shearing Trio's 1963 album Jazz Moments. Regarding the McCoy Tyner version on 1964's Today and Tomorrow, Michael G. Nastos wrote that "the chiming, wanton ballad 'When Sunny Gets Blue' drips with all the pure emotion that Tyner can wring out of a weepy piano." In a review of Matt Monro's 1967 album Here's to My Lady, Ankeny wrote, "Monro's vocals are smooth and rich like crushed velvet, tackling standards like … 'When Sunny Gets Blue' … with a thoughtfulness that comes only with age and experience." Regarding the Dexter Gordon Quartet's 1975 album Something Different, Yanow wrote, "Gordon stretches out on some standards, making a classic statement on the ballad 'When Sunny Gets Blue'." Yanow also mentioned the song as a highlight on Chris Connor's 1978 album Sweet and Swinging.

AllMusic critics have also commented on the song in contemporary reviews. In his review of the Paolo Fresu Quintet's 1991 album Ballads, Thom Jurek commented, "Beginning a ballad program with the quietly gorgeous 'When Sunny Gets Blue' is auspicious, especially when the opening measures feature a Fresu solo of such lyrical warmth and relaxed phrasing that the listener is nearly lulled into intoxication before [tenor saxophonist Tino] Tracana adds some weight in his own Cannonball Adderley way." Yanow wrote of Joe Williams's 1992 album Ballad and Blues Master that the singer "was in superior form for this live date, putting a lot of feeling into such songs as … 'When Sunny Gets Blue'." Yanow also commented on Boutté's 1996 But… Beautiful album, singling out the song as one of its highlights. Jonathan Widran described the version on Brandon Fields's 1999 album Fields and Strings as "a soulful, sentimental take". James Manheim felt the song "takes naturally to orchestral pop treatment" on the 2025 album Symphonic Steps by Livingston Taylor and the BBC Concert Orchestra.

== Legal case ==
"When Sunny Gets Blue" begins with the lyrics "When Sunny gets blue, her eyes get grey and cloudy; then the rain begins to fall." In 1984, DJ Rick Dees, a radio personality at Los Angeles radio station KIIS-FM, recorded a parody of the song for an album, including the lyrics "When Sunny sniffs glue, her eyes get red and bulgy, then her hair begins to fall". Dees sought permission to use the lyrics, but was refused; subsequently, he used 8 bars of the song under the fair use doctrine. In 1986, composer Marvin Fisher and lyricist Jack Segal sued Dees for copyright violation, unfair competition, product disparagement, and defamation in U.S. District Court for Los Angeles. At the request of the parties involved, the district court issued a summary judgment, finding for Dees. Fisher appealed the case to the U.S Court of Appeals for the 9th District, in Pasadena, California. The appellate court affirmed the judgment of the lower court in Fisher v. Dees 794 F.2d 432 (9th Cir. 1986), stating that the parody was intended to "criticize" for the purposes of humor, not to "copy", and did not damage the marketability of the original because they were two different markets of music. The case has become a landmark one, further refining the doctrine of fair use in U.S. copyright law.
