= Wonderful! Wonderful! =

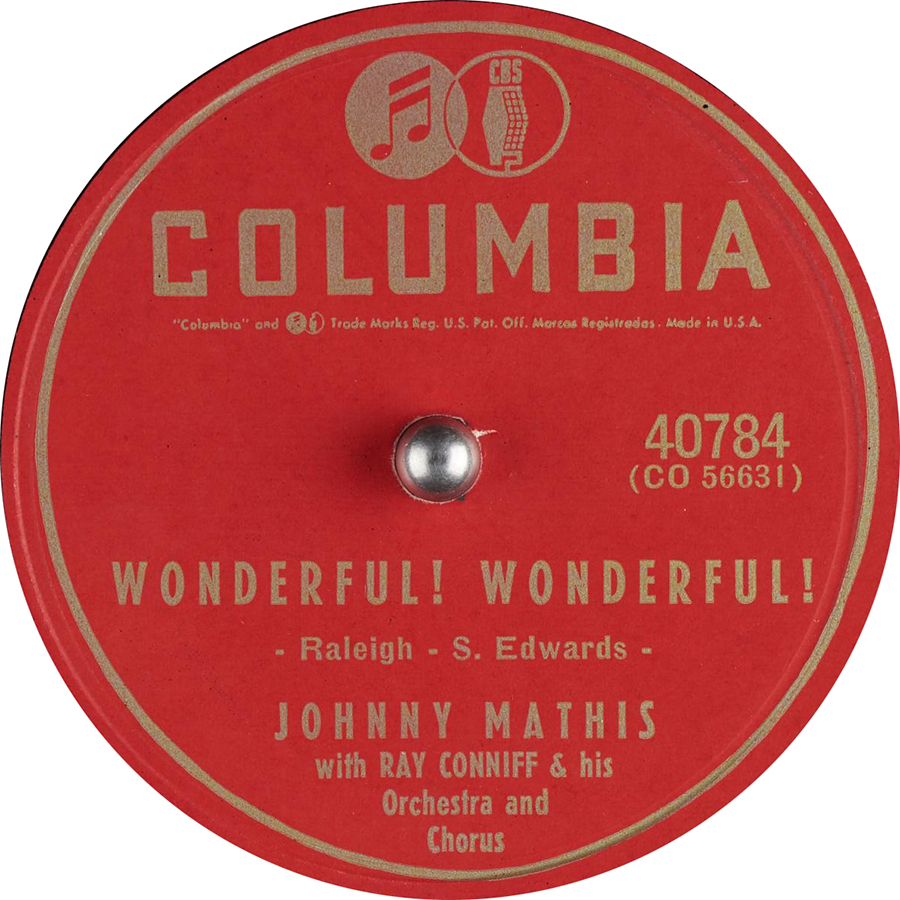

Single by Johnny Mathis with Ray Conniff and his Orchestra and Chorus

from the album Johnny's Greatest Hits
- B-side: "When Sunny Gets Blue"
- Released: November 5, 1956
- Recorded: September 21, 1956
- Studio: CBS 30th Street Studio (New York City)
- Genre: Pop
- Length: 2:49
- Label: Columbia
- Songwriters: Ben Raleigh; Sherman Edwards
- Producers: Al Ham; Mitch Miller

Johnny Mathis singles chronology
"Wonderful! Wonderful!" (1956)	"It's Not for Me to Say" (1957)

Music video
- "Wonderful! Wonderful!" on YouTube

"Wonderful! Wonderful!" is a song written by Ben Raleigh and Sherman Edwards that became the A-side of the first 7-inch single recorded by American singer Johnny Mathis, backed by Ray Conniff and his Orchestra and Chorus. The recording was produced by Mitch Miller and released on November 5, 1956. In the US it was a top 20 hit on the Billboard charts. In 1958 it was included on Mathis's first compilation, Johnny's Greatest Hits.

== Background, release and commercial performance ==
Johnny Mathis was billed as a jazz singer on his debut album, which was released by Columbia Records in 1956. In the liner notes for his 1993 box set The Music of Johnny Mathis: A Personal Collection, Mathis is quoted as saying that the head of A&R at Columbia, Mitch Miller, "hated what I was singing, and he hated the way I was singing it." Miller wanted to teach him to sing using the "choirboy quality in his voice". He gave Mathis a stack of demos and sheet music from which he was to select four songs for a recording session on September 21, 1956, with Miller and Al Ham producing. (Note: Neither the original 45 and 78 rpm singles nor the liner notes for Johnny's Greatest Hits provided producer credits, but other compilations have. The Essential Johnny Mathis, Gold: A 50th Anniversary Celebration and The Singles acknowledge Mitch Miller as a producer, but The Essential Johnny Mathis and Gold: A 50th Anniversary Celebration also credit Al Ham as a producer on this song.) Two of his selections, "Wonderful! Wonderful!" and "When Sunny Gets Blue", were released as his first single on November 5. The whistling on the former was provided by Dick Hyman.

"Wonderful! Wonderful!" spent 39 weeks on Billboard magazine's Top 100 record chart, a predecessor to the Hot 100 that combined the statistics from the magazine's Best Sellers in Stores, Most Played by Jockeys and Most Played in Jukeboxes charts. It was several months into its Top 100 run, however, before it reached its height in popularity. The song debuted on the Top 100 for the week ending January 30, 1957, at number 71 but took a roller coaster ride from there, falling to 81 the following week, surging to 57 by March 6, dropping to 70 the following week, rising to 56 on March 20 and falling to 60 the week after that. When it reached the top 40 on May 1, Columbia ran a full-page ad in Billboard that impressed upon readers how the song had found success five months after the magazine reviewed it.

Billboard theorized that it was the success of his second single, "It's Not for Me to Say", which had been released on February 25, that propelled "Wonderful! Wonderful!" to the peak positions it achieved. (Note: "However, Johnny's initial session produced two songs, 'Wonderful, Wonderful,' which was released immediately, but didn't sell until the second song, 'It's Not For Me To Say,' became a smash six months later.") When "Wonderful! Wonderful!" got as high as number 17 on the Top 100, number 14 on their list of the 25 songs Most Played by Jockeys and number 18 on their list of the 30 Best Sellers in Stores on the surveys for the week ending July 13, "It's Not for Me to Say" was several positions higher at numbers 6, 7 and 12, respectively. "Wonderful! Wonderful!" also reached number 12 on Cash Box magazine's best seller list.

When the magazine commemorated the 60th anniversary of Mathis's career in 2016, "Wonderful! Wonderful!" was number 8 on their list of his 10 top-charting hits.

== Critical reception ==
The editors of Billboard wrote, "Young singer will build reputation with first single for the label. Gets fine delivery into an attractive ballad, with imaginative support from Ray Conniff ork and chorus." Cashbox magazine gave letter grades to both sides of the single in its review. "When Sunny Gets Blue" received a B+ (meaning excellent), while "Wonderful! Wonderful!" earned a B (very good). Specifically of the latter, they wrote, "Another dreamy love story chanted in the crooner's unique fashion. A chorus assists with a beautiful background. Johnny has a sound and is destined to make the grade. Keep an eye on this lad."

In his review of the 1998 release The Ultimate Hits Collection, Robert Christgau insisted that

"Wonderful! Wonderful!", "It's Not for Me to Say", "Chances Are", "The Twelfth of Never", and "Wild Is the Wind" are the substance of Mathis's legend and legacy. Poised on the cusp of black and white, masculine and feminine, they projected an image of egoless tenderness, an irresistible breath of sensuality that infused the airwaves for the second half of 1957 and kept 1958's Johnny's Greatest Hits on the album chart for 490 weeks.

In a retrospective review, Joe Viglione of AllMusic wrote that the song "has those eerie Star Trek-style other world backing vocals with luscious strings that let Mathis express how ecstatic this love affair is, holding it in, telling only himself, letting it be reflected in his face (and, of course, this song)." He credits Conniff with his Orchestra and Chorus along with the singer for making the Mathis version "the one most remembered" and concludes

The youthful voice of the soon-to-be superstar sings out "What a moment to share" with passion and eloquence, the rhythm section very simple and non-obtrusive giving space to Conniff's thick strings and stunning backing vocalists. The dense and concise production surround Johnny's talents, setting the table for his classy performance.

== Charts ==
Weekly chart performance for "Wonderful! Wonderful!"
Chart (1957)	Peak position
US Top 100 (Billboard)	17
US Best Sellers in Stores (Billboard)	18
US Most Played by Jockeys (Billboard)	14
US Top 60 Best Selling Tunes on Records (Cash Box)	12

== Other versions ==
The song has been covered by various artists. In the United Kingdom, Ronnie Hilton recorded a version in 1957 that reached number 27 on the UK Singles Chart. In 1963, a recording by American soul vocal group the Tymes peaked at number 7 on the Billboard Hot 100 and number 23 on its Hot R&B Singles chart. Their version also spent four weeks at number 2 on the magazine's Easy Listening chart and reached number 7 in Canada.

A new version of the song was created for the X-Files episode "Home", using a singer with a voice similar to Mathis's. A cover version was used rather than the original because Mathis refused to allow his version to be used in the episode due to his objections to the graphic themes in the script. David Nutter, an X-Files producer, originally planned to record the cover himself as he also had a background in music but in the end, another singer was hired because he sounded more like Mathis than Nutter did. The episode's director Kim Manners explains his reason for wanting to use the song because he believed "certain songs [like 'Wonderful! Wonderful!'] have a creepy, icky quality that none of us have really openly acknowledged".

== Bibliography ==
- Whitburn, Joel (2004), Joel Whitburn Presents Top R&B/Hip-Hop Singles, 1942-2004, Record Research Inc., ISBN 0-89820-160-8
- Whitburn, Joel (2007), Joel Whitburn Presents Billboard Top Adult Songs, 1961-2006, Record Research Inc., ISBN 978-0-89820-169-7
- Whitburn, Joel (2009), Joel Whitburn's Top Pop Singles, 1955-2008, Record Research Inc., ISBN 0898201802
- Whitburn, Joel (2014), Joel Whitburn's Cash Box Pop Hits 1952-1996, Record Research Inc., ISBN 978-0-89820-209-0
