= The Hits of Johnny Mathis =

- Cover of the 1995 re-release

Compilation album by Johnny Mathis
- Released: April 21, 1992
- Recorded: 1956–1976
- Genre: Vocal; pop/rock
- Length: 57:05
- Label: Columbia

Johnny Mathis chronology
The Music of Johnny Mathis: A Personal Collection (1993)	The Hits of Johnny Mathis (1992)	All About Love (1996)

The Hits of Johnny Mathis is a compilation album by American pop singer Johnny Mathis that was released in the UK in April 1992 by Columbia Records and has three of his UK singles chart entries ("Misty", "I'm Stone in Love with You", and his 1981 duet remake of "When a Child Is Born" with Gladys Knight). This collection, however, focuses primarily on his covers of hits from the late 1960s through the 1970s. The album was re-released in October 1995.

On July 22, 2013, the British Phonographic Industry awarded the album with Gold certification for sales of 100,000 copies in the UK.

== Track listing ==
1. "Misty" (Johnny Burke, Erroll Garner) – 3:34
2. "(Where Do I Begin) Love Story" (Francis Lai, Carl Sigman) – 2:46
3. "Love Theme from Romeo and Juliet (A Time for Us)" (Larry Kusik, Nino Rota, Eddie Snyder) – 2:58
4. "The Twelfth of Never" (Jerry Livingston, Paul Francis Webster) – 2:28
5. "The Look of Love" (Burt Bacharach, Hal David) – 3:45
6. "This Guy's in Love with You" (Burt Bacharach, Hal David) – 4:38
7. "When Will I See You Again" (Kenny Gamble, Leon Huff) – 2:35
8. "I'm Stone in Love with You" (Anthony Bell, Thom Bell, Linda Creed) – 3:30
9. "Killing Me Softly with Her Song" (Charles Fox, Norman Gimbel) – 5:18
10. "Me and Mrs. Jones" (Kenny Gamble, Cary Gilbert, Leon Huff) – 4:10
11. "The First Time Ever (I Saw Your Face)" (Ewan MacColl) – 3:36
12. "(Do You Know Where You're Going To) Theme from Mahogany" (Gerry Goffin, Michael Masser) – 3:47
13. "Moon River" (Henry Mancini, Johnny Mercer) – 3:08
14. "Feelings" (Morris Albert, Loulou Gasté) – 3:28
15. "How Deep Is Your Love" (Barry Gibb, Maurice Gibb, Robin Gibb) – 3:42
16. "When a Child Is Born" performed with Gladys Knight (Ciro Dammicco, Fred Jay) – 3:41

== Personnel ==
- Johnny Mathis – vocals
