= The Essential Johnny Mathis =

Compilation album by Johnny Mathis
- Released: May 4, 2004
- Recorded: 1956–2000
- Genre: Vocal; R&B; stage & screen; pop/rock
- Length: 2:19:22
- Label: Columbia

Johnny Mathis chronology
The Christmas Album (2002)	The Essential Johnny Mathis (2004)	Isn't It Romantic: The Standards Album (2005)

Limited Edition 3.0
- Limited Edition 3.0 cover

Professional ratings
Review scores
Source	Rating
Allmusic	4.5/5 stars

The Essential Johnny Mathis is a compilation album by American pop singer Johnny Mathis that was released in 2004 by Columbia Records and includes several of his early hits such as "Chances Are" and "Misty" as well as a wide assortment of selections spanning more than four decades of his recording career.

An eight-song CD was added to the original two-disc set to create The Essential Johnny Mathis: Limited Edition 3.0, which was released on June 15, 2010.

== Track listing ==
Disc 1

1. "Fly Me to the Moon (In Other Words)" (Bart Howard) – 3:51
2. "When Sunny Gets Blue" (Marvin Fisher, Jack Segal) – 2:41
3. "It's Not for Me to Say" (Robert Allen, Al Stillman) – 3:05
4. "Wonderful! Wonderful!" (Sherman Edwards, Ben Raleigh) – 2:50
5. "Chances Are" (Robert Allen, Al Stillman) – 3:03
6. "No Love (But Your Love)" (Billy Myles) – 2:18
7. "The Twelfth of Never" (Jerry Livingston, Paul Francis Webster) – 2:28
8. "Wild Is the Wind" (Dimitri Tiomkin, Ned Washington) – 2:26
9. "Teacher, Teacher" (Robert Allen, Al Stillman) – 2:38
10. "A Certain Smile" (Sammy Fain, Paul Francis Webster) – 2:47
11. "Sleigh Ride" performed with Percy Faith & His Orchestra (Leroy Anderson, Mitchell Parish) – 3:01
12. "My Funny Valentine" (Lorenz Hart, Richard Rodgers) – 3:33
13. "Misty" (Johnny Burke, Erroll Garner) – 3:34
14. "Small World" (Stephen Sondheim, Jule Styne) – 3:18
15. "Maria" (Leonard Bernstein, Stephen Sondheim) – 3:45
16. "Stairway to the Stars" (Matty Malneck, Mitchell Parish, Frank Signorelli) – 4:54
17. "Gina" (Leon Carr, Paul Vance) – 2:46
18. "What Will Mary Say" (Eddie Snyder, Paul Vance) – 3:09
19. "The Sweetheart Tree" (Henry Mancini, Johnny Mercer) – 2:11
20. "On a Clear Day (You Can See Forever)" (Burton Lane, Alan Jay Lerner) – 2:49
21. "The Look of Love" (Burt Bacharach, Hal David) – 3:45
22. "Love Theme from Romeo and Juliet (A Time for Us)" (Larry Kusik, Nino Rota, Eddie Snyder) – 2:58

Disc 2

1. "I'm Coming Home" (Thom Bell, Linda Creed) – 3:24
2. "Life Is a Song Worth Singing" (Thom Bell, Linda Creed) – 6:06
3. "99 Miles from L.A." (Hal David, Albert Hammond) – 3:35
4. "What I Did for Love" (Marvin Hamlisch, Edward Kleban) – 2:44
5. "When a Child Is Born" (Ciro Dammicco, Fred Jay) – 3:41
6. "Too Much, Too Little, Too Late" performed with Deniece Williams (Nat Kipner, John Vallins) – 2:59
7. "Begin the Beguine" (Cole Porter) – 4:16
8. "Memory" (T. S. Eliot, Trevor Nunn, Andrew Lloyd Webber) – 3:00
9. "Friends in Love" performed with Dionne Warwick (Bill Champlin, David Foster, Jay Graydon) – 4:03
10. "Brazil (Aquarela do Brasil)" (Ary Barroso, Bob Russell) – 4:13
11. "Prelude to a Kiss" (Duke Ellington, Irving Gordon, Irving Mills) – 2:52
12. "What Are You Doing the Rest of Your Life?" (Alan and Marilyn Bergman, Michel Legrand) – 3:05
13. "Let Your Heart Remember" (Stephen Bishop, Jeff Jones) – 4:36
14. "Un-Break My Heart" (Diane Warren) – 5:00
15. "Because You Loved Me" (Warren) – 4:36
16. "Life Is Just a Bowl of Cherries"(featuring Forever Plaid) (Lew Brown, Ray Henderson) – 2:46
17. "On Broadway" (Barry Mann, Cynthia Weil, Jerry Leiber, Mike Stoller) – 3:24

Disc 3 (Limited Edition 3.0 version only)

1. "When I Fall in Love" (Edward Heyman, Victor Young) – 4:33
2. "I Wish I Were in Love Again" (Richard Rodgers, Lorenz Hart) – 3:41
3. "Bye Bye Barbara" (Jack Segal, Paul Vance) – 2:38
4. "No Strings" (Rodgers) – 3:17
5. "Beyond the Blue Horizon" (W. Franke Harling, Leo Robin, Richard A. Whiting) - 2:57
6. "The Last Time I Felt Like This" performed with Jane Olivor (A. Bergman, M. Bergman, Marvin Hamlisch) – 2:57
7. "El Amar y el Querer" (Manuel Alejandro, Ana Magdalena) – 4:13
8. "Baía (Na Baixa do Sapateiro)" (Ary Barroso, Ray Gilbert) – 4:13

== Personnel ==
- Johnny Mathis – vocals

Compilation

- Didier C. Deutsch – producer
- Darcy M. Proper – producer, mastering engineer
- Steve Berkowitz – A&R
- Joy Gilbert Monfried – project director
- Patti Matheny – A&R coordinator
- Darren Salmieri – A&R coordinator
- Adam Farber – A&R coordinator
- Susan N. Jacobs – business affairs administration
- Peter Cho – studio administration
- Sheila Johnson – studio administration
- Mike Kull – tape research
- Hooshik Bayliss – art direction/design
- Bret Lopez – front cover photography
- Bob Cato – photography
- Norman Menard – photography
- Hank Parker – photography
- Sandy Speiser – photography
- David Vance – photography
- Bob Willoughby – photography
