= No Love (But Your Love) =

- US 7-inch single picture sleeve

Single by Johnny Mathis

from the album Johnny's Greatest Hits
- A-side: "Wild Is the Wind"
- Released: November 11, 1957
- Recorded: June 16, 1957
- Studio: Columbia 30th Street Studio, New York City
- Genre: Pop
- Label: Columbia
- Songwriter(s): Billy Myles
- Producer(s): Al Ham; Mitch Miller

Johnny Mathis singles chronology
"Chances Are" / "The Twelfth of Never" (1957)	"Wild Is the Wind" / "No Love (But Your Love)" (1957)	"Come to Me" (1958)

Music video
- "No Love (But Your Love)" on YouTube

"No Love (But Your Love)" is a popular song written by Billy Myles that was recorded by Johnny Mathis in 1957. It made the top 40 on most record charts in the US.

== Recording and release ==
"No Love (But Your Love)" was recorded by Johnny Mathis with Ray Conniff and his orchestra on June 16, 1957, as were "Chances Are" and "The Twelfth of Never", which were released together as a single two months later, on August 12. Mitch Miller and Al Ham produced these recordings.^{[A]} "No Love (But Your Love)" was released on November 11, 1957, as the B-side of "Wild Is the Wind", the title song from the 1957 film of the same name.

== Commercial performance ==
At the time of the release of the "Wild Is the Wind"/"No Love (But Your Love)" single, Billboard magazine had three pop singles charts: Best Sellers in Stores, Most Played by Jockeys, and Top 100 Sides. "Wild Is the Wind" debuted on all three charts in the issue dated December 16, 1957. "No Love (But Your Love)", however, was only listed in that issue on the Best Sellers in Stores chart, where B-sides were listed for all songs. It debuted at number 62 on the Top 100 Sides chart in the following issue, and made its first appearance on the Most Played by Jockeys chart in the issue dated January 6, 1958. It eventually peaked at number 21 there, number 37 Best Sellers and number 48 Top 100 Sides. It also reached number 26 on Cash Box magazine's best seller list.

== Critical reception ==
In their review column, the editors of Cash Box featured the single as their Disk of the Week, which was their equivalent to a letter grade of A for both songs. Regarding "No Love (But Your Love)" they wrote, "Superbly written ballad executed by one of the great new voices in the business." The editors of Billboard also commented on both songs, opining, "Either side is a strong bet to click." They described "No Love (But Your Love)" as "a tango delivered with light guitar accompaniment."

== Charts ==
Weekly chart performance for "No Love (But Your Love)"
Chart (1957)	Peak position
US Top 100 (Billboard)	48
US Best Sellers in Stores (Billboard)	37
US Most Played by Jockeys (Billboard)	21
US Top 60 Best Selling Tunes on Records (Cash Box)	26

== Notes ==
A. ^{1} Neither the original 45 and 78 rpm singles nor the liner notes for Johnny's Greatest Hits provided producer credits, but other compilations have. The Essential Johnny Mathis, Gold: A 50th Anniversary Celebration and The Singles acknowledge Mitch Miller as a producer, but The Essential Johnny Mathis also credits Al Ham as a producer on this song.

== Bibliography ==
- Whitburn, Joel (2009), Joel Whitburn's Top Pop Singles, 1955-2008, Record Research Inc., ISBN 0898201802
