= Fisher v. Dees =

- Court: United States Court of Appeals for the Ninth Circuit
- Full case name: Marvin Fisher d/b/a Marvin Music Company and Jack Segal, Plaintiffs-Appellants, v. Rick Dees, Atlantic Recording Corporation, Warner Communications, INC., Defendants-Appellees
- Decided: July 10, 1986
- Defendant: Rick Dees
- Prosecution: Marvin Fisher
- Citation: 794 F.2d 432

Case history
- Prior actions: District court grants summary judgement which disposes Fisher and Segals claim of federal claim for copyright infringement and their state-law claims for unfair competition, defamation, and product disparagement.
- Subsequent actions: Distinguished in Henley v. Devore

Court membership
- Judges sitting: John Clifford Wallace, Joseph Tyree Sneed III, and Alex Kozinski

Keywords
- copyright infringement, defamation, disparagement, economic effect, fair use, original work, original, parody, permission, substantiality, unfair competition

Fisher v. Dees was a 1986 case of the United States Court of Appeals for the Ninth Circuit whose judgement refined the doctrine of fair use in American copyright law.

== History and impact ==
In 1984, Rick Dees, a disc jockey, sought and was refused permission to use Marvin Fisher's song "When Sunny Gets Blue", with the intention of creating a "comedic and inoffensive" version. Although the request was rejected, Dees released an album, Put It Where the Moon Don't Shine, with a song entitled "When Sonny Sniffs Glue". It sampled from the very recognizable main theme, along with recognizably altered song lyrics:

When Sunny gets blue, her eyes get gray and cloudy, then the rain begins to fall

was changed to:

When Sonny sniffs glue, her eyes get red and bulgy, then her hair begins to fall.

The parody used 29 seconds of the song. Fisher and his affiliated parties filed a complaint on the grounds of unfair competition, defamation and copyright infringement.

With respect to the copyright infringement claim, the court held that the fair use doctrine protected Rick Dees because of the lack of detrimental economic impact and the editorial nature of the song.

According to an unrestricted Shepherd's summary, this case has been cited 91 times, with the majority of the cases dealing with commercial parodies, but a large plurality are also cited within the realm of government works. Fisher v. Dees has had a large effect on defining what constitutes a parody and bounding the concept of "fair use."

== Fair use analysis and state law claims ==
In determining that Dees' use was a fair use, the court examined five areas: (1) the subject of the parody; (2) the propriety of Dees's conduct; (3) the purpose and character of the use; (4) the economic effect of the use, and (5) the amount and substantiality of the taking.

First, the court holds that this parody poked fun at the composer's vocal style and the lyrics in Dees's version.

Second, the court examined Dees' conduct in using the song after being denied permission to use it. The court held that this was not blameworthy for two reasons. First, it is rare for a parodist to actually receive permission and second, to make this action blameworthy would be to penalize showing of consideration in giving the composer notification.

Third, the court finds that the commercial nature of parodies is not necessarily damning to the editorial nature of the song, if the defendant can show that there is not unfair economic diminishment. The court makes the distinction between criticism that might harm the value because of its poignant nature and copyright infringement which steals market demand. "When Sonny Sniffs Glue," is a song that is vastly different from the romantic nature of "When Sunny Gets Blue," and would be highly unlikely to fulfill the demand of someone looking to buy a song for that reason. Therefore, the parody is much more in line with the former biting criticism.

Finally, the court acknowledges a tension that exists between making the consumer of the parody realize that it is a parody of the original work and respecting the rights of the original owner. Dees is held to have only taken the requisite amount as to reasonably accomplish the task of parody. In the question of unfair competition, the court hold that a plaintiff can bring this charge when "passing off occurs," namely the public is led to believe that the plaintiff's product is actually the defendant's. This question is left open as being redressable—possibly—by federal law, but not by the statutes advanced by the composers.

In the question of defamation, the court holds that defamation can even occur within parodies if the original work becomes associated with "obscene, indecent, and offensive words," which did not occur in this case.
