= All About Love (Johnny Mathis album) =

Studio album by Johnny Mathis
- Released: May 7, 1996
- Recorded: 1996
- Studio: A&M Studios (Hollywood, California)
- Genre: Vocal
- Length: 41:42
- Label: Columbia
- Producer: Phil Ramone

Johnny Mathis chronology
The Hits of Johnny Mathis (1995)	All About Love (1996)	The Ultimate Hits Collection (1998)

Professional ratings
Review scores
Source	Rating
AllMusic	3/5 stars
Billboard	(positive)
The Encyclopedia of Popular Music	3/5 stars

All About Love is an album by American pop singer Johnny Mathis that was released on May 7, 1996, by Columbia Records and pairs him with producer Phil Ramone for his first venture into contemporary material since 1985's Right from the Heart. The two albums share the fact that they do not include covers of songs associated with other artists, which makes them unique entries in the Mathis catalog.

The album reached number 119 during its sole week on the Billboard 200 album chart in the issue of the magazine dated May 25 of that year.

== Reception ==
Mathis's new offering earned the approval of Billboard magazine: "From the layered string sounds of 'I Will Walk Away' to the intimacy of 'Why Goodbye' to the catchy chorus of 'Every Beat of My Heart,' Mathis soothes with his trademark silky tenor."

== Track listing ==
1. "Let Your Heart Remember" (Stephen Bishop, Jeff Jones) – 4:36
2. "I Will Walk Away" (Gerry Goffin, Carole King) – 3:59
3. "Every Beat of My Heart" (Earl Rose, Brian McKnight) – 3:58
4. "Why Goodbye" (Diane Warren) – 4:50
5. "Like No One in the World" (Burt Bacharach, John Bettis) – 4:31
6. "One More Night" (Stephen Bishop) – 3:26
7. "Let Me Be the One" (Burt Bacharach, Denise Rich, Taja Sevelle) – 5:00
8. "Welcome Home" (Ray Chafin, Dobie Gray, Bud Reneau) – 3:20
9. "Sometimes Love's Not Enough" (Kenny Denton, Danny Saxon) – 4:37
10. "Could It Be Love This Time" (Mark Radice) – 3:18

== Personnel ==
From the liner notes for the original album:

Performers

- Johnny Mathis – vocals
- Mark Portmann – keyboards, arrangements
- Michael Thompson – guitars (1, 4, 7)
- Dean Parks – guitars (2, 5, 6, 8)
- Warren Wiebe – backing vocals (1–5, 7, 8)
- Alexandra Brown – backing vocals (1, 3, 5, 7)
- Carmen Twillie – backing vocals (1, 3, 5, 7)
- Mona Lisa Young – backing vocals (1, 3, 5, 7)
- Danny Saxon – backing vocals (9)

Production

- Don DeVito – A&R
- Phil Ramone – producer, mixing
- Bill Malina – engineer
- Kaz Masumoto – mixing
- Mike Baumgartner – associate mixing engineer
- Krish Sharma – assistant engineer
- John Srebalus – assistant engineer
- Susanne Marie Edgren – production coordinator
- Chie Masumoto – production coordinator
- Nancy Donald – art direction
- Hooshik – design
- Rocky Schenck – photography

== Bibliography ==
- Whitburn, Joel (2010), Joel Whitburn Presents Top Pop Albums, Seventh Edition, Record Research Inc., ISBN 0-89820-183-7
