= A Certain Smile (song) =

1958 single by Johnny Mathis

- Artwork for the US 7-inch single

Single by Johnny Mathis

from the album More Johnny's Greatest Hits
- B-side: "Let It Rain"
- Released: June 2, 1958
- Recorded: May 12, 1958
- Genre: Pop
- Length: 2:47 (7" single); 3:37 (film version)
- Label: Columbia (US); Fontana (UK)
- Songwriters: Sammy Fain; Paul Francis Webster
- Producers: Al Ham; Mitch Miller

Johnny Mathis singles chronology
| "All the Time" / "Teacher, Teacher" (1958) | "A Certain Smile" (1958) | "Call Me" (1958) |

Music video
- "A Certain Smile" on YouTube

"A Certain Smile" is a popular song that was written by Sammy Fain and Paul Francis Webster for the 1958 film of the same name. Johnny Mathis performed the song in the film, and his recording reached the top 20 on the record charts in the US and the top five in the UK. The songwriters were nominated for the Academy Award for Best Original Song in 1959.

== Background ==
"A Certain Smile" was composed by Sammy Fain with lyrics by Paul Francis Webster. In the liner notes for his 1993 box set The Music of Johnny Mathis: A Personal Collection, Mathis wrote, "Sammy Fain was one of those wonderful old-fashioned people who came to your house and played the song for you and sang it with gusto and told you the whole story of the movie." Mathis plays himself in A Certain Smile. He sings the title song in a scene in an elegant restaurant as the main characters and other patrons listen. Mathis also wrote, "I was thrilled to do the song for the movie."

== Recording and release ==
Mathis recorded "A Certain Smile" with an orchestra conducted by Ray Ellis on May 12, 1958, with Mitch Miller and Al Ham producing. (Note: Neither the original 45 and 78 rpm singles nor the liner notes for More Johnny's Greatest Hits provided producer credits, but other compilations have. The Essential Johnny Mathis, Gold: A 50th Anniversary Celebration and The Singles acknowledge Mitch Miller as a producer, but The Essential Johnny Mathis and Gold: A 50th Anniversary Celebration also credit Al Ham as a producer on this song.) The single was released on June 2, 1958, approximately two months before the film's July 31 premiere.

In 2011, La-La Land Records reissued an expanded soundtrack to the film, which included the title song as it is sung in the film and the version without the opening verse, which was on the single and included on the original soundtrack album.

== Commercial performance ==
At the time of the release of "A Certain Smile", Billboard magazine had three pop singles charts: Best Sellers in Stores, Most Played by Jockeys, and Top 100 Sides. "A Certain Smile" made its chart debut in the issue dated June 30, 1958, and peaked at number 14 on the Most Played by Jockeys chart, number 21 Best Sellers in Stores and number 19 Top 100 Sides. It spent 16 weeks on the UK singles chart that began in October of that year and peaked at number 4.

== Critical reception ==
In their review column, the editors of Cash Box magazine featured the single as their Disk of the Week, which was their equivalent to a letter grade of A for both songs. They described Mathis's recording of "A Certain Smile" as "a superb interpretation". They also wrote, "Excellently written love song tailor-made for the Mathis touch." The editors of Billboard described it as "a very lovely flick title tune that is handed a stylish reading by the chanter with excellent ork backing."

== Academy Award nomination ==
"A Certain Smile" was nominated for Best Song and later performed at the 31st Academy Awards in 1959 by John Raitt with dancers Gower and Marge Champion. The winner was the title song from Gigi.

== Charts ==
Weekly chart performance for "A Certain Smile"
| Chart (1958) | Peak position |
|---|---|
| Belgium (Ultratop 50 Wallonia) | 30 |
| Norway (VG-lista) | 7 |
| UK Singles (Official Charts) | 4 |
| US Top 100 (Billboard) | 19 |
| US Best Sellers in Stores (Billboard) | 21 |
| US Most Played by Jockeys (Billboard) | 14 |

== Bibliography ==
- Whitburn, Joel (2009), Joel Whitburn's Top Pop Singles, 1955-2008, Record Research Inc., ISBN 978-0898201802
- Wiley, Mason; Bona, Damien (1996), Inside Oscar: The Unofficial History of the Academy Awards, Ballantine Books, ISBN 0-345-40053-4
