= Teacher, Teacher (Johnny Mathis song) =

Single by Johnny Mathis

from the album More Johnny's Greatest Hits
- A-side: "All the Time"
- Released: March 17, 1958
- Recorded: October 31, 1957
- Genre: Pop
- Length: 2:41
- Label: Columbia
- Songwriter(s): Robert Allen; Al Stillman
- Producer(s): Al Ham; Mitch Miller

Johnny Mathis singles chronology
| "Come to Me" (1957) | "All the Time" / "Teacher, Teacher" (1958) | "A Certain Smile" (1958) |

Music video
- "Teacher, Teacher" on YouTube

"Teacher, Teacher" is a popular song with lyrics by Al Stillman and music by Robert Allen that was recorded by Johnny Mathis in 1958. It charted in or near the top 40 in the US and the UK.

== Background ==
In his 1991 book Popular Music Perspectives: Ideas, Themes, and Patterns, author B. Lee Cooper gives examples of how memorable teachers had been incorporated into popular songs in the 1950s such as "Abigail Beecher" by Freddy Cannon and "Mr. Lee" by The Bobbettes. He notes how "one observes that these and other teachers are memorable not so much for their pedagogical prowess as for their imagined erotic appeal." The Johnny Mathis recording of "Teacher, Teacher" is given as an additional example, citing the lyric, "Make me the teacher's pet".

== Recording and release ==
Johnny Mathis recorded "Teacher, Teacher" on October 31, 1957, with an orchestra conducted by Ray Ellis. It was produced by Al Ham and Mitch Miller (Note: Neither the original 45 and 78 rpm singles nor the liner notes for More Johnny's Greatest Hits provided producer credits, but other compilations have. The Essential Johnny Mathis, Gold: A 50th Anniversary Celebration and The Singles acknowledge Mitch Miller as a producer, but The Essential Johnny Mathis also credits Al Ham as a producer on this song.) and released as a single on March 17, 1958, with the A-side "All the Time".

== Commercial performance ==
At the time of the release of "Teacher, Teacher", Billboard magazine had three pop singles charts: Best Sellers in Stores, Most Played by Jockeys, and Top 100 Sides. "Teacher, Teacher" made its chart debut in the issue dated May 5, 1958, and peaked at number 21 on the Most Played by Jockeys chart, number 30 Best Sellers in Stores and number 43 Top 100 Sides. When it reached number 27 in the UK, it became his first chart hit there.

== Critical reception ==
In their review column, the editors of Cash Box magazine featured the single as their Disk of the Week, which was their equivalent to a letter grade of A for both songs. They described "Teacher, Teacher" as "an excellent side. A rhythmic romantic novelty with a catchy jump beat, a pleasant melody, and a smart lyric." The editors of Billboard described it as "an up-tempo go on a Bob Allen tune."

== Charts ==
Weekly chart performance for "Teacher, Teacher"
| Chart (1958) | Peak position |
|---|---|
| US Top 100 (Billboard) | 43 |
| US Best Sellers in Stores (Billboard) | 30 |
| US Most Played by Jockeys (Billboard) | 21 |
| UK Singles Chart | 27 |

== Bibliography ==
- Cooper, B. Lee (1991), Popular Music Perspectives: Ideas, Themes, and Patterns, Bowling Green State University Popular Press, ISBN 0879725052
- Whitburn, Joel (2009), Joel Whitburn's Top Pop Singles, 1955-2008, Record Research Inc., ISBN 0898201802
