= Come to Me (Johnny Mathis song) =

- US 7-inch single

Single by Johnny Mathis

from the album Johnny's Greatest Hits
- B-side: "When I Am with You"
- Released: December 30, 1957
- Recorded: October 31, 1957
- Genre: Pop
- Length: 3:21
- Label: Columbia
- Composer: Robert Allen
- Lyricist: Peter Lind Hayes
- Producer: Mitch Miller

Johnny Mathis singles chronology
"Wild Is the Wind" / "No Love (But Your Love)" (1957)	"Come to Me" (1957)	"All the Time" / "Teacher, Teacher" (1958)

Music video
- "Come to Me" on YouTube

"Come to Me" is a popular song written by Robert Allen and Peter Lind Hayes that was recorded by Johnny Mathis in 1957. It made the top 40 on most record charts in the US.

== Background, recording and release ==
"Come to Me" was written for an episode of the Kraft Television Theatre of the same name. The song's lyricist, Peter Lind Hayes, also co-wrote the episode, which aired on December 4, 1957. Johnny Mathis recorded the song on October 31 of that year with Mitch Miller producing and an orchestra conducted by Ray Ellis. It was released as a single on December 30.

== Commercial performance ==
At the time of the release of "Come to Me", Billboard magazine had three pop singles charts: Best Sellers in Stores, Most Played by Jockeys, and Top 100 Sides. "Come to Me" made its chart debut in the issue dated February 10, 1958, and peaked at number 22 on the Most Played by Jockeys chart, number 40 Best Sellers in Stores and number 43 Top 100 Sides. It also reached number 23 on Cash Box magazine's best seller list.

== Critical reception ==
In their review column, the editors of Cash Box featured the single as their Disk of the Week, which was their equivalent to a letter grade of A for both songs. They described "Come to Me" as "a brilliant new love song" and wrote that it "stands out as one of Mathis's greatest ballad readings of his young and tremendously successful career. Johnny sings his heart out on this side and is supported by a superb Ray Ellis orchestration." The editors of Billboard wrote:

Mathis, the one-man answer to rock and roll, is batting 1.000 to date, and this entry is quite likely to lengthen his string. Top side … is one of those simple, melodious, heartfelt ballads that his fans have come to expect .... Mathis himself sounds better than ever.

== Charts ==
Weekly chart performance for "Come to Me"
Chart (1958)	Peak position
US Top 100 (Billboard)	43
US Best Sellers in Stores (Billboard)	40
US Most Played by Jockeys (Billboard)	22
US Top 60 Best Selling Tunes on Records (Cash Box)	23

== Bibliography ==
- Whitburn, Joel (2009), Joel Whitburn's Top Pop Singles, 1955-2008, Record Research Inc., ISBN 0898201802
