= All the Time (Johnny Mathis song) =

- US 7-inch single

Single by Johnny Mathis

from the album Johnny's Greatest Hits
- B-side: "Teacher, Teacher"
- Released: March 17, 1958
- Recorded: January 7, 1958
- Genre: Pop
- Length: 2:45
- Label: Columbia
- Songwriter(s): Ray Evans; Jay Livingston
- Producer(s): Mitch Miller

Johnny Mathis singles chronology
"Come to Me" (1957)	"All the Time" / "Teacher, Teacher" (1958)	"A Certain Smile" (1958)

Music video
- "All the Time" on YouTube

"All the Time" is a popular song written by Ray Evans and Jay Livingston that was recorded by Johnny Mathis in 1958. It made the top 40 on most record charts in the US.

== Origins ==
"All the Time" was written for the 1958 Broadway musical Oh, Captain! by Ray Evans and Jay Livingston. It is first performed in the musical by the character Captain Henry St. James and then later by Mrs. Maud St. James, who were played, respectively, by Tony Randall and Jackie McKeever in the original Broadway production. Oh, Captain! had its first preview on January 28, 1958; its opening night was one week later, on February 4.

== Recording and release ==
Johnny Mathis recorded "All the Time" on January 7, 1958, with an orchestra conducted by Ray Ellis. It was produced by Mitch Miller and released as a single on March 17 of that year with the B-side "Teacher, Teacher".

== Commercial performance ==
At the time of the release of "All the Time", Billboard magazine had three pop singles charts: Best Sellers in Stores, Most Played by Jockeys, and Top 100 Sides. "All the Time" made its chart debut in the issue dated April 21, 1958, and peaked at number 21 on the Most Played by Jockeys chart, number 30 Best Sellers in Stores and number 42 Top 100 Sides.

== Critical reception ==
In their review column, the editors of Cash Box magazine featured the single as their Disk of the Week, which was their equivalent to a letter grade of A for both songs. They described "All the Time" as "another brilliant reading by the gifted vocal craftsman. Emotional love tune from the B'way musical hit Oh Captain! Potent number that needs repeated play. But it's strong." The editors of Billboard wrote, "Mathis gives the pretty ballad from Oh, Captain! a warm, sincere reading with lush ork support from Ray Ellis. His smooth treatment makes the side a strong bet to score."

== Charts ==
Weekly chart performance for "All the Time"
Chart (1958)	Peak position
US Top 100 (Billboard)	42
US Best Sellers in Stores (Billboard)	30
US Most Played by Jockeys (Billboard)	21

== Bibliography ==
- Whitburn, Joel (2009), Joel Whitburn's Top Pop Singles, 1955-2008, Record Research Inc., ISBN 0898201802
