= Chances Are (song) =

- US 7-inch single picture sleeve

Single by Johnny Mathis

from the album Johnny's Greatest Hits
- B-side: "The Twelfth of Never"
- Released: August 12, 1957
- Recorded: June 16, 1957
- Studio: Columbia 30th Street Studio, New York City
- Genre: Pop
- Length: 2:57
- Label: Columbia
- Composer: Robert Allen
- Lyricist: Al Stillman
- Producers: Al Ham; Mitch Miller

Johnny Mathis singles chronology
"It's Not for Me to Say" (1957)	"Chances Are" / "The Twelfth of Never" (1957)	"Wild Is the Wind" / "No Love (But Your Love)" (1957)

Music video
- "Chances Are" on YouTube

"Chances Are" is a popular song with music by Robert Allen and lyrics by Al Stillman that was recorded by Johnny Mathis in 1957. It reached number one on various record charts in Billboard and Cash Box magazines. The song was inducted into the Grammy Hall of Fame in 1998 and was selected by the Library of Congress for preservation in the National Recording Registry in 2024.

== Background ==
Johnny Mathis had a top 10 hit in 1957 with "It's Not for Me to Say", which was written by Robert Allen and Al Stillman. Allen later told Mathis they had a new song for him called "Chances Are", but until Mathis heard it, he was skeptical of it having as much success. Mathis recorded the song on June 16, 1957, with Mitch Miller and Al Ham producing,^{[A]} Ray Conniff conducting his orchestra, and Dick Hyman on the piano.

== Release and commercial performance ==
"Chances Are" was released on August 12, 1957, with the B-side "The Twelfth of Never". "Chances Are" spent 28 weeks on Billboard magazine's Top 100 record chart, a predecessor to the Hot 100 that combined the statistics from the magazine's Best Sellers in Stores and Most Played by Jockeys charts. It made its debut on the Top 100 in the issue dated September 16, 1957, and later peaked at number 5 there and number 4 on the Best Sellers chart. It spent a week at number 1 on the magazine's list of songs Most Played by Jockeys for the survey week ending October 12, 1957. On the magazine's R&B Best Sellers chart, it peaked at number 12. It also reached number 1 on Cash Box magazine's best seller list. In Canada, the song reached number 3 on the CHUM Charts. On Billboard's year-end list of the top 50 singles of 1957, the song came in at number 22. Cash Box's year-end ranking for the song was number 5.

When Billboard commemorated the 60th anniversary of Mathis's career in 2016, "Chances Are" was number 1 on their list of his 10 top-charting hits.

== Critical reception ==
In their review column, the editors of Cash Box featured the single as their Disk of the Week, which was their equivalent to a letter grade of A for both songs. They wrote that Mathis "hands in a masterful job of an outstanding new love song titled 'Chances Are'. It’s an extremely commercial romantic item with a smart lyric and a beautiful melody …, and chances are it'll be another huge seller." The editors of Billboard wrote, "Strong selling by the artist on a pretty ballad that is very much like 'It's Not for Me to Say'. Soft, effective orking by Ray Conniff and vocal appeal by the artist give the side top potential."

Robert Christgau insisted that "Chances Are", "Wonderful! Wonderful!", "It's Not for Me to Say", "The Twelfth of Never", and "Wild Is the Wind" "are the substance of Mathis's legend and legacy. Poised on the cusp of black and white, masculine and feminine, they projected an image of egoless tenderness, an irresistible breath of sensuality that infused the airwaves for the second half of 1957 and kept 1958's Johnny's Greatest Hits on the album chart for 490 weeks."

== Legacy ==
Regarding the success of "Chances Are", Mathis said in 2015, "It was the biggest thrill and the biggest kind of thing that made me want to continue to sing or try to sing well, because I knew that anything that I did from then on was going to be heard by a lot of people."

"Chances Are" was inducted into the Grammy Hall of Fame in 1998. It was listed at number 175 on the Songs of the Century list compiled by the Recording Industry Association of America in 2001. In 2024, the song was selected by the Library of Congress for preservation in the National Recording Registry, based on its "cultural, historical or aesthetic importance in the nation’s recorded sound heritage". American Songwriter included "Chances Are" on its list of 5 Songs that Show Johnny Mathis Is the King of the Classic Ballad Singers.

== Uses in other media ==
Mathis made a 2015 guest appearance on The Simpsons in which he sings "Chances Are" with different lyrics. He told the Associated Press in 2014 after having completed his voice work on the episode that it was "the coolest thing" he had done in a long time.

In an interview that was posted in 2022, Professor of Rock Adam Reader discusses how the song's use in Steven Spielberg's 1977 film Close Encounters of the Third Kind is mentioned in the 2017 documentary Spielberg:

[Spielberg] talks about when the aliens came, how would we communicate? And he first thought math, but he said, "No, I think it would be music because music is something that touches all of us, and it's more emotion and feeling." And he used it in that part where—it's an appropriate choice for him because he used it when the little boy met the alien.

Mathis replied:

It's the thrill of my life. I actually met [Steven Spielberg] at some function maybe a year before that was released, and he said, "Oh, yeah, I used one of your songs in my film." And I forgot all about it, and then when I saw the film, this wonderful, wonderful film, it was the most exciting thing that ever happened to me when I saw that. And I must have gone back to that theater a thousand times.

== Charts ==
=== Weekly charts ===
Weekly chart performance for "Chances Are"
Chart (1957)	Peak position
Canada (CHUM Hit Parade)	3
US Top 100 (Billboard)	5
US Best Sellers in Stores (Billboard)	4
US Most Played by Jockeys (Billboard)	1
US R&B Best Sellers (Billboard)	12
US Top 60 Best Selling Tunes on Records (Cash Box)	5

=== Year-end charts ===
Year-end chart performance for "Chances Are"
Chart (1957)	Peak position
US Top 100 (Billboard)	22
US Best Selling Records (Cash Box)	5

== Notes ==
A. ^{1} Neither the original 45 and 78 rpm singles nor the liner notes for Johnny's Greatest Hits provided producer credits, but other compilations have. The Essential Johnny Mathis, Gold: A 50th Anniversary Celebration and The Singles acknowledge Mitch Miller as a producer, but The Essential Johnny Mathis also credits Al Ham as a producer on this song.

== Bibliography ==
- Whitburn, Joel (2004), Joel Whitburn Presents Top R & B / Hip-Hop Singles, 1942-2004, Record Research Inc., ISBN 0898201608
- Whitburn, Joel (2009), Joel Whitburn's Top Pop Singles, 1955-2008, Record Research Inc., ISBN 978-0898201802
