= Wild Is the Wind (song) =

1957 song by Dimitri Tiomkin and Ned Washington

- US 7-inch single picture sleeve

Single by Johnny Mathis
- B-side: "No Love (But Your Love)"
- Released: November 11, 1957
- Recorded: October 1, 1957
- Studio: Columbia 30th Street Studio, New York City
- Genre: Pop
- Length: 2:22
- Label: Columbia
- Composer: Dimitri Tiomkin
- Lyricist: Ned Washington
- Producers: Al Ham; Mitch Miller

Johnny Mathis singles chronology
"Chances Are" / "The Twelfth of Never" (1957)	"Wild Is the Wind" / "No Love (But Your Love)" (1957)	"Come to Me" (1957)

"Wild Is the Wind" is a song written by Dimitri Tiomkin and Ned Washington for the 1957 film of the same name. Johnny Mathis recorded the song for the film, and it was released as a single in November 1957. His version reached the top 40 on the record charts in Billboard magazine. The songwriters were nominated for an Academy Award for Best Song in 1958.

The song has been recorded many times by many performers. The best known versions are those recorded by Nina Simone (from her 1966 album of the same name) and by David Bowie (from his 1976 album Station to Station).

== Johnny Mathis version ==
Wild Is the Wind producer Hal B. Wallis signed Mathis to record the title song as part of the opening credits. Mathis recorded it on October 1, 1957, with Ray Ellis conducting the orchestra and Mitch Miller and Al Ham producing.^{[A]} Mathis recorded "Wild Is the Wind" with a flexible sense of meter, rushing some words as if they were speech.

The single was released on November 11, 1957. At the time, Billboard magazine had three pop singles charts: Best Sellers in Stores, Most Played by Jockeys and Top 100 Sides. "Wild Is the Wind" made its first chart appearance in the issue dated December 16, 1957. It eventually peaked at number 22 Most Played by Jockeys, number 30 Best Sellers and number 37 Top 100 Sides. It also reached number 20 on Cash Box magazine's best seller list.

Billboard magazine described the Mathis recording as "a sensitive reading". They wrote, "A contrapuntal theme on harmonica is effectively set against the attractive vocal." Cashbox magazine wrote, "Johnny reads the tender lyrics in his penetrating fashion and displays his tremendous vocal range at its best." In a retrospective review of various versions of the song, AllMusic's Bill Janovitz described the Mathis rendition as "lush".

More than two dozen foreign language versions of the song were recorded and released to coincide with the film's distribution overseas.

"Wild Is the Wind" was nominated for Best Song at the 30th Academy Awards in 1958, where Mathis performed it live. The winner was "All the Way" by Jimmy Van Heusen and Sammy Cahn from The Joker is Wild.

== Charts ==
=== Weekly charts ===
Weekly chart performance for "Wild Is the Wind" by Johnny Mathis
Chart (1957)	Peak position
US Top 100 (Billboard)	37
US Best Sellers in Stores (Billboard)	30
US Most Played by Jockeys (Billboard)	22
US Top 60 Best Selling Tunes on Records (Cash Box)	20

== Nina Simone version ==
Nina Simone first recorded "Wild Is the Wind" for the 1959 live album Nina Simone at Town Hall. In a retrospective review for AllMusic, Scott Yanow described the rendition as a "classic" version. For the studio recording released on the 1966 compilation album Wild Is the Wind Simone extensively reworked the song, with slow, sparse instrumentation and her drawn-out vocal delivery expressing a sense of loss. Regarding this recording, Janovitz wrote that "there is a real sense of the Eastern European flavor of the tune. It is a minor-key affair, with a dramatic, sweeping melody." With her approach, "all hope seems lost; she sounds as mournful as she has on almost any of her recordings -- resolved that her lover is gone, yet singing to herself as if he were there."

In November 2013, the song reached number 6 on Billboard's Digital Jazz chart.

== David Bowie version ==
"Wild Is the Wind"

Single by David Bowie

from the album Changestwobowie
- B-side: "Golden Years"
- Released: 13 November 1981
- Recorded: September–November 1975
- Studio: Cherokee, Los Angeles
- Genre: Pop
- Length: 3:34 (music video); 5:58 (album version)
- Label: RCA
- Songwriters: Dimitri Tiomkin; Ned Washington
- Producers: David Bowie; Harry Maslin

David Bowie singles chronology
"Under Pressure" (1981)	"Wild Is the Wind" (1981)	"Baal" (1982)

David Bowie recorded a version of "Wild Is the Wind" for his 1976 album Station to Station. Bowie was an admirer of Simone's style, and he was inspired to record the song after meeting her in Los Angeles in 1975. He later recalled that Simone's version "really affected [him]...[he] recorded it as an hommage to Nina." Bowie took special care with the arrangement and production of "Wild Is the Wind", committing to an emotional and romantic vocal performance modeled after Simone's which has often been cited as one of his best.

=== Single release and promotional video ===
To promote the 1981 compilation album Changestwobowie, an edit of Bowie's version of "Wild Is the Wind" was released as a single, and a black and white promotional video was made, directed by David Mallet. It featured Bowie and four musicians miming to the studio recording, including Tony Visconti (double bass), Coco Schwab (guitar), Mel Gaynor (drums), and Andy Hamilton (saxophone): none of the four musicians had played on the studio recording. The black backdrop and stark lighting reproduced the style of Bowie's Isolar – 1976 Tour in support of Station to Station. The single reached number 24 in the UK and number 15 in Ireland.

=== Critical reception ===
In a review of 2005's The Platinum Collection, AllMusic's James Christopher Monger categorized Bowie's recording as an "oft-overlooked gem".

=== Personnel ===
According to Chris O'Leary and Benoît Clerc:

- David Bowie – lead vocals
- Carlos Alomar – acoustic rhythm guitar
- Earl Slick – electric lead guitar
- George Murray – bass guitar
- Dennis Davis – drums

Technical

- David Bowie – producer
- Harry Maslin – producer

=== Live versions ===
Bowie performed the song during his June 2000 Mini Tour. A live recording from the BBC Radio Theatre in London on June 27, 2000, was released on a bonus disc accompanying the first release of Bowie at the Beeb in 2000. A performance on June 23, 2000, was recorded for Channel 4's TFI Friday. Bowie's performance of the song at the 2000 Glastonbury Festival was released in 2018 on Glastonbury 2000, a live album documenting his set.

Bowie also performed the song with Mike Garson on piano for the Black Ball charity concert in New York in November 2006; the concert was Bowie's final stage performance before his death in 2016.

== Notable cover versions ==
Various versions of "Wild Is the Wind" have been praised by the editors of Cash Box magazine in reviews of the albums or singles on which they appear. In their critique of Shirley Horn's recording, which was the B-side of a single in 1961, they wrote, "Horn has a distinctive whisper sound in this striking view of the awhile back Johnny Mathis hit that seems to be headed for evergreen status." Gloria Lynne delivered a "superb rendition" on her 1961 album He Needs Me. In 1964 Joe and Eddie also made a recording that was the B-side of a single, which the magazine's editors gave a letter grade of B (meaning good).

Billboard also highlighted recordings of "Wild Is the Wind" in various reviews. Regarding Shirley Horn's B-side, they wrote, "The thrush comes through with a warm, tender and softly-voiced performance of the much-performed tune over simple backing." In a review of Pike's Peak by the Dave Pike Quartet, they described the song as one of "the better tracks". Randy Crawford's version on her 2001 album Permanent/Play was described as "hauntingly romantic".

AllMusic critics have commented in reviews on various versions of the song. Jean DuShon's recording on her 1966 album Feeling Good was described by Andrew Hamilton as "crafty". On Larry Young's 1967 Contrasts, Scott Yanow found the vocals on the song by Young's wife Althea to be "haunting". Yanow noted Madeline Eastman's version on 1990's Point of Departure to be a highlight. Brian Bartolini described the Fred Hersch Trio's rendition on 1992's Dancing in the Dark as one of the "best tracks". In a review of the Steve Berrios 1994 album First World, Richard S. Ginell wrote, that Berrios "even plays some noteworthy muted trumpet" on the song. Judith Schlesinger reviewed 1999's New Beginnings by the Steve Nelson Quartet and wrote, "The closer is an unusual up-tempo version of the haunting 'Wild Is the Wind', capping a set of warm, relaxed, inviting jazz." Also in 1999, Stephen Thomas Erlewine reviewed George Michael's Songs from the Last Century and commented that "he does bring style and sophistication to these standards, even such often-covered yet still difficult tunes as 'Wild Is the Wind'." Heather Phares felt that Cat Power's version on 2000's The Covers Record displayed "brooding sensuality". Regarding Lina Nyberg's recording from 2000's Smile, Dave Nathan wrote, "The dark, cloudy sound of the cello contrasts with the clarity of Nyberg's voice on 'Wild Is the Wind'." In his review of 2003's The Movie Album by Barbra Streisand, William Ruhlmann found her delivery of the song less satisfying than others on the album, writing, "She frequently goes for lyrics about mature love … and she sounds more convincing singing them, giving the words more emphasis than she does, for instance, when she just tosses off the line 'You're life itself!' in 'Wild Is the Wind'." Michael G. Nastos noted that Jimmy Ponder's Somebody's Child in 2007 contained "a Latin variation of the usually balladic" song. Ken Dryden's review of Dee Alexander's album titled after the song in 2009 described the singer's "flair for drama" on the track. Thom Jurek noted that Esperanza Spalding's arrangement of the song on 2010's Chamber Music Society "combines jazz, tango, and classic pop." Phares described Xiu Xiu's cover on their 2013 Simone tribute album Nina as "relatively faithful but not slavish". Regarding Lauryn Hill's recording on the 2015 Nina Revisited: A Tribute to Nina Simone, David Jeffries wrote, "Her 'Wild Is the Wind' is elegance with an edge."

=== Grammy nomination ===
Robert Farnon received a Grammy nomination for Best Instrumental Arrangement for the track "Wild Is the Wind" from J. J. Johnson's 1997 album The Brass Orchestra.

== Notes ==
- ^{A} Neither the original 45 and 78 rpm singles nor the liner notes for Johnny's Greatest Hits provided producer credits, but other compilations have. The Essential Johnny Mathis, Gold: A 50th Anniversary Celebration and The Singles acknowledge Mitch Miller as a producer, but The Essential Johnny Mathis and Gold: A 50th Anniversary Celebration also credit Al Ham as a producer on this song.

== Bibliography ==
- Clerc, Benoît (2021). David Bowie All the Songs: The Story Behind Every Track. New York City: Black Dog & Leventhal. ISBN 978-0-7624-7471-4.
- O'Leary, Chris (2015). Rebel Rebel: All the Songs of David Bowie from '64 to '76. Winchester: Zero Books. ISBN 978-1-78099-244-0.
- O'Neil, Thomas (1999). The Grammys. Perigree Books. ISBN 0-39952-477-0.
- Pegg, Nicholas (2011). The Complete David Bowie (6th ed.). London: Titan Books. ISBN 9780857682901.
- Whitburn, Joel (2009). Joel Whitburn's Top Pop Singles, 1955-2008. Record Research Inc. ISBN 978-0898201802.
- Wiley, Mason; Bona, Damien (1996). Inside Oscar: The Unofficial History of the Academy Awards. Ballantine Books. ISBN 0-345-40053-4.
