= Gold: A 50th Anniversary Celebration =

Compilation album by Johnny Mathis
- Released: November 21, 2006
- Recorded: 1956–1959; 1986–2006
- Genre: Vocal; R&B; pop/rock
- Length: 1:01:25
- Label: Columbia

Johnny Mathis chronology
Gold: A 50th Anniversary Christmas Celebration (2006)	Gold: A 50th Anniversary Celebration (2006)	A Night to Remember (2008)

Professional ratings
Review scores
Source	Rating
Allmusic	4/5 stars

Gold: A 50th Anniversary Celebration is a compilation album by American pop singer Johnny Mathis that was released on November 21, 2006, by Columbia Records and takes the first 13 of its 18 tracks from the first four years of his recording career. The collection then jumps ahead 27 years for the remaining five songs, two of which had not been released elsewhere: "So Many Stars" comes from the recording date of an unfinished Sergio Mendes project, and "The Shadow of Your Smile" was later featured on the 2007 Dave Koz album At the Movies.

This compilation reached number 171 during its sole week on Billboard magazine's album chart in the issue dated December 30, 2006.

== Track listing ==
1. "Chances Are" performed with Ray Conniff & His Orchestra (Robert Allen, Al Stillman) – 3:03
2. "Wonderful! Wonderful!" (Sherman Edwards, Ben Raleigh) – 2:50
3. "It's Not for Me to Say" (Robert Allen, Al Stillman) – 3:05
4. "The Twelfth of Never" performed with Ray Conniff & His Orchestra (Jerry Livingston, Paul Francis Webster) – 2:28
5. "When Sunny Gets Blue" (Marvin Fisher, Jack Segal) – 2:41
6. "Wild Is the Wind" (Dimitri Tiomkin, Ned Washington) – 2:26
7. "Misty" (Johnny Burke, Erroll Garner) – 3:34
8. "Small World" (Stephen Sondheim, Jule Styne) – 3:18
9. "A Certain Smile" (Sammy Fain, Paul Francis Webster) – 2:47
10. "Maria" (Leonard Bernstein, Stephen Sondheim) – 3:45
11. "What'll I Do" performed with Percy Faith & His Orchestra (Irving Berlin) – 2:55
12. "One God" performed with Percy Faith & His Orchestra (Ervin Drake, Jimmy Shirl) – 3:50
13. "Deep River" performed with Percy Faith & His Orchestra (traditional) – 2:49
14. "True Love" (Cole Porter) – 3:06
15. "So Many Stars" (Alan and Marilyn Bergman, Sérgio Mendes) – 4:03
16. "In a Sentimental Mood" (Duke Ellington, Manny Kurtz, Irving Mills) – 4:05
17. "The Shadow of Your Smile" performed with Dave Koz and Chris Botti (Johnny Mandel, Paul Francis Webster) – 5:22
18. "Over the Rainbow" performed with Ray Charles (Harold Arlen, E.Y. Harburg) – 4:52

== Personnel ==
Original albums

- Johnny Mathis – vocals

Compilation

- Johnny Mathis – executive producer
- Jay Landers – executive producer; A&R for Columbia Records
- Didier C. Deutsch – producer
- Mark Wilder – mastering
- Steve Berkowitz – A&R
- Patti Matheny – A&R
- Howard Fritzson – art direction
- Mark Larson – design
- Peter Fletcher – product direction
- Mandy Eidgah – product direction
- Omar Carrasquilla – tape research
- Mike Kull – tape research
- Michael Ochs Archives, CRPS – photography
- Mastered at Sony Music Studios, New York

== Bibliography ==
- Whitburn, Joel (2010), Joel Whitburn Presents Top Pop Albums, Seventh Edition, Record Research Inc., ISBN 0-89820-183-7
