= Jay Livingston =

American songwriter (1915–2001)

- Livingston
- Born: Jacob Harold Levison; March 28, 1915; McDonald, Pennsylvania, U.S.
- Died: October 17, 2001 (aged 86); Los Angeles, California, U.S.
- Education: University of Pennsylvania
- Occupation: Composer
- Years active: 1937–2001
- Spouse(s): Lynne Gordon (1947–1991; her death); Shirley Mitchell (1992–2001; his death)
- Children: 2 children, including Tammy Livingston

Jay Livingston (born Jacob Harold Levison; March 28, 1915 – October 17, 2001) was an American composer best known as half of a composing-songwriting duo with Ray Evans, with whom he specialized in composing film scores and original soundtrack songs. Livingston composed the music while Evans wrote the lyrics.

== Biography ==
=== Early life and family ===
Jay Livingston was born Jacob Harold Levison in McDonald, Pennsylvania, United States, to Jewish parents. He had an older sister, Vera, and a younger brother, Alan W. Livingston, who became an executive with Capitol Records and later with NBC television.

=== Career ===
Livingston studied piano with Harry Archer in Pittsburgh, Pennsylvania. He attended the University of Pennsylvania, where he organized a dance band and met Evans, a fellow student in the band. Though they began writing together in 1937, Livingston and Evans did not hit the top until 1946, when they set the music publishing business on fire with "To Each His Own," which reached number one on the Billboard charts for three different artists, and occupied the top five positions on the "Most Played On the Air" chart for four different weeks (August 24, 1946, and again on September 7, September 14 and October 5, five versions appeared simultaneously in the Top Ten).

"Buttons and Bows" (1947) was their next multi-million seller, with four artists reaching the top ten in 1948, and won the Academy Award for Best Song. They finished off the decade with 1949's "Mona Lisa", which was a chart hit for seven popular and two country artists in 1950, sold a million for Nat King Cole, and won the pair another Best Song Oscar. Their third Oscar came in 1956 for the song "Que Sera, Sera (Whatever Will Be, Will Be)", featured in the movie The Man Who Knew Too Much. They also wrote "Tammy" for the movie Tammy and the Bachelor in 1957.

Livingston and Evans wrote also popular TV themes for shows including Bonanza and Mister Ed, which Livingston sang. They also wrote the Christmas song "Silver Bells" in 1951, for the film The Lemon Drop Kid, initially calling it "Tinkle Bells" but changed it to "Silver" because of a common connotation of "tinkle", as well as "Never Let Me Go" for the 1956 film The Scarlet Hour. Johnny Mathis sang Livingston's song "All The Time", among others.

Livingston appeared as himself with Evans in the New Year's Eve party scene of the 1950 film Sunset Boulevard, which featured his future sister-in-law, Nancy Olson.

=== Death ===
Livingston died aged 86, on October 17, 2001, in Los Angeles, California, and was interred there in Westwood Memorial Park Cemetery; on his tombstone is written "Que Será, Será".

== Honors ==
Livingston is an inductee in the Songwriters Hall of Fame. In 2004, the Pennsylvania Historical and Museum Commission installed a historical marker in McDonald, Pennsylvania, commemorating his achievements.

== Works on Broadway ==
- Oh, Captain! (1958) – musical – co-composer and co-lyricist with Ray Evans – Tony nomination for Best Musical
- Let It Ride (1961) – musical – co-composer and co-lyricist with Ray Evans
- Sugar Babies (1979) – revue – featured songwriter with Ray Evans for "The Sugar Baby Bounce"
