= The Twelfth of Never =

1956 song written by Jerry Livingston and Paul Francis Webster

- US 7-inch single picture sleeve

Single by Johnny Mathis

from the album Johnny's Greatest Hits
- A-side: "Chances Are"
- Released: August 12, 1957
- Studio: Columbia 30th Street Studio, New York City
- Genre: Pop
- Length: 2:25
- Label: Columbia
- Songwriters: Jerry Livingston, Paul Francis Webster
- Producers: Al Ham; Mitch Miller

Johnny Mathis singles chronology
"It's Not for Me to Say" (1957)	"Chances Are" / "The Twelfth of Never" (1957)	"Wild Is the Wind" / "No Love (But Your Love)" (1957)

Music video
- "The Twelfth of Never" on YouTube

"The Twelfth of Never" is a popular song adapted from an old English folk song in 1956 by Jerry Livingston and Paul Francis Webster. Various recording artists have had chart hits with "The Twelfth of Never", including Johnny Mathis, Cliff Richard, Donny Osmond and Slim Whitman.

== Background ==
The Riddle Song
Much of the music for "The Twelfth of Never" came from "The Riddle Song".

"The Twelfth of Never" was adapted from "The Riddle Song" (also known as "I Gave My Love a Cherry"), an old English folk song. Jerry Livingston and Paul Francis Webster wrote the bridge and new lyrics in 1956. The title "The Twelfth of Never" is an idiom referring to the date of a future occurrence that will never come to pass. In the case of the song, "the 12th of Never" is given as the date on which the singer will stop loving his beloved, thus indicating that he will always love her.

== Johnny Mathis recording ==
Johnny Mathis recorded "The Twelfth of Never" and another song, "Chances Are", on June 16, 1957, with Mitch Miller and Al Ham producing.^{[A]} Years later Mathis told John Gilliland's Pop Chronicles:

"The Twelfth of Never" I disliked from the very beginning because it was all based on one chord. The only thing I liked about it was the marvelous bridge released in the middle of the song …. My knees were shaking when I recorded that, but I didn't like it because it was all so repetitious and nothing seemed to happen. And I was really Joe College at that time. I was right out of college, and I was, you know, hot to trot. I wanted to do something, you know, rah-rah-rah, you know, something earth-shattering—at least pyrotechnical.

=== Release and reception ===
"The Twelfth of Never" was released on August 12, 1957, with the A-side "Chances Are". "The Twelfth of Never" spent 17 weeks on Billboard magazine's Top 100 record chart, a predecessor to the Hot 100 that combined the statistics from the magazine's Best Sellers in Stores and Most Played by Jockeys charts. It made its debut on the Top 100 in the issue dated October 14, 1957, and later peaked at number 51 there. It went to number 9 on the Most Played by Jockeys chart. The "Chances Are"/"The Twelfth of Never" single reached number 4 on their list of Best Sellers in Stores.

The editors of Cash Box magazine compared "The Twelfth of Never" to "Chances Are", writing that the former "displays Johnny in a more dramatic vein as he chants an emotional and very touching folk flavored ballad of deep love." After noting the origins of the song, the Billboard editors wrote, "Charming new lyrics and presentation by Mathis should attract."

In his 2023 book B-Side: A Flipsided History of Pop, Andy Cowan mentioned several other artists who have covered the song but wrote, "none have quite matched Mathis's quivering emotional reach or the sustained emotive power of his heavy vibrato." In 2024 American Songwriter included "The Twelfth of Never" on its list of 5 Songs that Show Johnny Mathis Is the King of the Classic Ballad Singers. They wrote:

Many others have recorded the song, but Mathis's version is undoubtedly the definitive. The lyrics could come off as cheesy, but Mathis sings them as if they were handed down to him by a higher power. He inhabits the momentous production without any ounce of self-consciousness, which … is stunning considering his youth when he recorded it.

=== Chart performance ===
Chart performance for "The Twelfth of Never" by Johnny Mathis
Chart (1957–1958)	Peak position
Australia (Sydney, Australia)	2
US Billboard Top 100	51
US Best Sellers in Stores (Billboard)	4
US Most Played by Jockeys (Billboard)	9

== Cliff Richard version ==
"The Twelfth of Never"

Single by Cliff Richard
- B-side: "I'm Afraid to Go Home"
- Released: October 2, 1964
- Recorded: June 23, 1964
- Studio: Abbey Road
- Genre: Pop
- Label: Columbia Graphophone
- Songwriters: Jerry Livingston, Paul Francis Webster
- Producer: Norrie Paramor

Cliff Richard singles chronology
"On the Beach" (1964)	"The Twelfth of Never" (1964)	"I Could Easily Fall (in Love with You)" (1964)

Music video
- "The Twelfth of Never" on YouTube

A version by British singer Cliff Richard was released in 1964 and reached number 8 in the UK. It also hit number 3 in Malaysia, number 5 in Hong Kong, number 6 in Australia, number 9 in Ireland and Norway and number 13 in the Netherlands.

The editors of Billboard wrote, "The hot English vocalist with a tasteful reading of the old Johnny Mathis hit should prove equally successful on the charts. A bow to producer Norrie Paramor."

In a retrospective review of More Hits by Cliff, AllMusic's Dave Thompson included Richard's "skillful reading" of "The Twelfth of Never" on his list of "exquisite" singles on the compilation.

=== Chart performance ===
Chart performance for "The Twelfth of Never" by Cliff Richard
Chart (1964–1965)	Peak position
Australia (Kent Music Report)	6
Hong Kong	5
Ireland (IRMA)	9
Malaysia	3
Netherlands (Single Top 100)	13
New Zealand (Lever Hit Parade)	7
Norway (VG-lista)	9
UK Singles (Official Charts)	8
US Cash Box Looking Ahead	29

== Donny Osmond version ==
"The Twelfth of Never"

Single by Donny Osmond

from the album Alone Together
- B-side: "Life Is Just What You Make It"
- Released: February 24, 1973
- Recorded: November 27, 1972
- Genre: Pop
- Length: 2:40
- Label: MGM 14503
- Songwriters: Jerry Livingston, Paul Francis Webster
- Producers: Mike Curb, Don Costa

Donny Osmond singles chronology
"Why" / "Lonely Boy" (1972)	"The Twelfth of Never" (1973)	"Young Love" / "A Million to One" (1973)

Music video
- "The Twelfth of Never" on YouTube

Donny Osmond's version, produced by Mike Curb and Don Costa, debuted on the Billboard Hot 100 in the issue dated March 3, 1973, and spent 13 weeks there, peaking at number 8 in the April 28 issue. It debuted on the UK Singles Chart for the week ending March 10, 1973, but rose to its peak position there much more quickly, spending a week at number one three weeks later, on March 31. It also went to number 7 on Billboard's Adult Contemporary chart during its 9 weeks there.

The editors of Billboard wrote, "Donny provides a full, alive interpretation to this beautiful evergreen. His voice is getting deeper and there is a nice contrast between his vocal quality and Costa's mid-range string sounds."

In a retrospective review of Osmond's 1973 album Alone Together, AllMusic's Dave Thompson wrote that "his version of 'Twelfth of Never' is all but definitive".

=== Chart performance ===
Chart performance for "The Twelfth of Never" by Donny Osmond
Chart (1973)	Peak position
Australia (Kent Music Report)	2
Belgium (Ultratop 50 Flanders)	14
Canada Top Singles (RPM)	4
Denmark (Tracklisten)	15
Germany (Media Control)	29
Malaysia	8
Netherlands (Single Top 100)	12
New Zealand (Listener)	5
Singapore	2
UK Singles (Official Charts)	1
US Billboard Adult Contemporary	7
US Billboard Hot 100	8

=== Certifications ===
Donny Osmond version

Region	Certification	Certified units/sales
United States (RIAA)	Gold	1,000,000^{^}
^{^} Shipments figures based on certification alone.

== Other charting versions ==
- 1966: Slim Whitman reached number 17 on Billboard's Country singles chart.
- 1969: The Chi-Lites took the song to number 47 on the R&B chart. They also "bubbled under" the Hot 100 in Billboard to number 122.
- 1974: Elvis Presley recorded an informal rehearsal, which was released as a single in 1995 to promote Walk a Mile in My Shoes: The Essential '70s Masters, reaching number 21 in the UK.
- 1977ː David Houston's version on his album David Houston spent its one week on the Billboard Country chart at number 98. The magazine's editors noted that it was one of the best songs on the album.

== Notable cover versions ==
Various versions of "The Twelfth of Never" have been praised by the editors of Cash Box magazine in reviews of the albums on which they appear. In their critique of For You, For Me, For Evermore by the Anita Kerr Quartet in 1960, they wrote that "their smooth blend gently caresses such stalwarts as … 'The Twelfth of Never'". Claude Gray's 1962 recording on the album Country Goes to Town was described as "warm and intimate". On Bobby Vinton Sings the Big Ones in 1962, the singer "shines". The 1963 album The Fleetwoods Sing for Lovers by Night includes a "professional and harmonious rendition" of the song. They described the version on 1963's Nina Simone at Carnegie Hall as a "top-flight reading". The editors called the song one of the "bright bands" on both Mel Carter's When a Boy Falls in Love in 1963 and Billy J. Kramer's I'll Keep You Satisfied in 1964.

Billboard also highlighted recordings of "The Twelfth of Never" in various reviews. They felt that the version on 1963's Swing Along with Floyd Cramer "should get a lot of play" by radio stations. They gave Mark Dinning's 1963 recording four stars. The song was mentioned as one of the "highly playable tracks" on Nina Simone at Carnegie Hall. The 1966 album Chér had a "fresh approach". Arthur Prysock brought "his very own phrasing and intonation" to the track from 1969's Where the Soul Trees Grow. Tammy Wynette's rendition on 1970's The Ways to Love a Man was "beautiful". They felt it was one of the best songs on Charlie Rich's Tomorrow Night in 1973 and Charlie McCoy's Charlie My Boy in 1975.

AllMusic critics have commented in retrospective and contemporary reviews on various interpretations of the song. In his comments on the version from Oliver's 1970 album Again, Joe Viglione wrote that "the execution is way off". Conversely, he described Olivia Newton-John's rendition on her 1989 album Warm and Tender as a "great job". Scott Yanow noted that the "folkish" arrangement on Dianne Reeves's 1997 album That Day … was a highlight. In a review of The Greatest Love Songs of All Time by Barry Manilow in 2010, Stephen Thomas Erlewine described the song as "great".

== Notes ==
A. ^{1} Neither the original 45 and 78 rpm singles nor the liner notes for Johnny's Greatest Hits provided producer credits, but other compilations have. The Essential Johnny Mathis, Gold: A 50th Anniversary Celebration and The Singles acknowledge Mitch Miller as a producer, but The Essential Johnny Mathis also credits Al Ham as a producer on this song.

== Bibliography ==
- Cowan, Andy (June 6, 2023). B-Side: A Flipsided History of Pop. SCB Distributors. ISBN 978-1-915316-14-1.
- Furia, Philip (2002). American Song Lyricists, 1920–1960. Gale Group. ISBN 0-7876-6009-4.
- Obert, Julia C. (2015). Postcolonial Overtures: The Politics of Sound in Contemporary Northern Irish Poetry (reprint ed.). Syracuse, New York: Syracuse University Press. ISBN 9780815653493.
- Whitburn, Joel (2009), Joel Whitburn's Top Pop Singles, 1955-2008, Record Research Inc., ISBN 0898201802
