= Jack Segal =

American musician

Jack Segal (October 19, 1918 – February 10, 2005) was an American pianist and composer of popular American songs, known for writing the lyrics to "Scarlet Ribbons". His composition "May I Come In?" was the title track for a Blossom Dearie album. Other songs he authored or co-authored are "When Sunny Gets Blue", "That's the Kind of Girl I Dream Of", "I Keep Going Back to Joe's" (with Marvin Fisher), "A Boy from Texas, a Girl from Tennessee" (with John Benson Brooks and Joseph Allan McCarthy), "After Me" (with Blossom Dearie) and "When Joanna Loved Me" (with Robert Wells). It has been estimated that his songs have helped sell 65 million records.

Lyrics for the ballad that was perhaps Segal's greatest hit, "Scarlet Ribbons" (with music composed by Evelyn Danzig Levine), were written in just 15 minutes in 1949, and the song was recorded that year by Jo Stafford. Recordings by Juanita Hall and Dinah Shore soon followed, but the song was largely ignored by the public until 1956, when a 1952 recording by Harry Belafonte's became suddenly popular in the wake of Belafonte's breakthrough calypso hits. At least 30 other artists have also recorded "Scarlet Ribbons", including The Kingston Trio, Joan Baez, Sinéad O'Connor, the Lennon Sisters, Wayne Newton, Perry Como, and Dinah Shore.

Segal's music was also featured in movie and television soundtracks such as Star Trek: Deep Space Nine.

In addition to the artists already mentioned, his songs have been recorded by Frank Sinatra, Frankie Laine, Cher, Barbra Streisand, Tony Bennett, Nancy Wilson, Rosemary Clooney, Al Jarreau and Nat King Cole.

== Biography ==
Segal was born in Minneapolis, Minnesota and earned a bachelor's degree in political science from the University of Wisconsin, a master's degree from the New School for Social Research and also studied creative writing. He began his songwriting career in Paramount Pictures' music department, and by the mid-1940s, was writing songs recorded by artists including Nat King Cole and Boyd Raeburn. Later in Segal's career he wrote songs for television and taught songwriting at Cal State Northridge and in University of Southern California continuing education classes. He died of natural causes at the age of 86 in Tarzana, Los Angeles, California. At the time of his death, he was married to Helen Segal, and was survived by her, and their three sons, David, Mark and Jason, and a daughter, Jody Davis.

== Compositions ==
- "A Boy from Texas, a Girl from Tennessee"
- "After Me"
- "Bye Bye Barbara"
- "Here's To The Losers"
- "I Keep Goin' Back To Joe's"
- "I'll Remember Suzanne" (written with Dick Miles)
- "Laughing Boy"
- "May I Come In?"
- "More Love"
- "No Spring This Year" (written with Maddy Russell)
- "Scarlet Ribbons (For Her Hair) "
- "Something Happens to Me"
- "Strings"
- "That's the Kind of Girl I Dream Of"
- "This God-Forsaken Day"
- "Too Soon Old—Too Late Smart"
- "What Are You Afraid Of"
- "When Joanna Loved Me"
- "When Sunny Gets Blue"
- "Who Started Love?"
- "Words and Music" (written with Marvin Fisher)

== Discography ==
- When Sunny Gets Blue, Scarlet Ribbons and Other Songs I Wrote (Goodnight Kiss Records, produced by Janet Fisher)

== Notes ==
- Larkin, Colin: The Encyclopedia of Popular Music. Third edition. Macmillan 1998.
- Musicians' Union national directory of members 2001. Second edition. Musicians's Union 2001.
