= Jerry Livingston =

American songwriter (1909–1987)

Jerry Livingston (born Jerry Levinson; March 25, 1909 – July 1, 1987) was an American songwriter and dance orchestra pianist.

== Biography ==
Born in Denver, Colorado to Sam and Dora (Lazarus) Levinson, Jerry Livingston studied music at the University of Arizona. While there he composed his first score for a college musical. He moved to New York City in the 1930s, initially working as a pianist for dance orchestras. Livingston served in the Army's Special Services division during World War II.

Among the songs Livingston helped write are "It's the Talk of the Town", "Under a Blanket of Blue", "Blue and Sentimental", "Close to You", "Mairzy Doats", "Wake the Town and Tell the People", "The Twelfth of Never", and "Young Emotions".

From the 1940s to the 1960s he wrote songs for numerous films and television series, including Cinderella (1950), Bronco (1958), 77 Sunset Strip (television series, 1958), Hawaiian Eye (television series, 1959), Bourbon Street Beat (television series, 1959), Surfside 6 (television series, 1960), and the song "This is It" (for the 1960s The Bugs Bunny Show). He worked on Tin Pan Alley and co-wrote with Mack David the theme song to Casper the Friendly Ghost, and co-wrote "The Unbirthday Song" for Alice in Wonderland and "Trick or Treat For Halloween" for Trick or Treat with David and Al Hoffman.

Livingston's Broadway compositions included the musical Molly and the musical revue Bright Lights of 1944, both with Mack David. With Mack David, he was nominated three times for the Academy Awards, the first time in 1951 for the song "Bibbidi-Bobbidi-Boo" from Cinderella (1950) with Al Hoffman, again in 1960 for the song "The Hanging Tree" from the film of the same name (1959), and the last time for "The Ballad of Cat Ballou" (from the 1965 film Cat Ballou) in 1966.

In 1965, he and his wife, Ruth (née Schwartz), a former singer, were shot at their Beverly Hills home on North Rodeo Drive by their son, Gary, for "bugging him about getting out of bed at 1 PM", after Gary had reportedly attempted suicide the previous night. Jerry and Ruth Livingston were taken to UCLA Medical Center in "satisfactory condition." Livingston had a bullet wound in his left arm and his wife was shot in the chest. Gary Livingston barricaded himself in the house and defied officers with a cache of arms a 12 gauge shotgun, a .22 caliber revolver and a .22 caliber rifle. Tear gas was used to take him into custody.

Jerry Livingston died of a heart condition at his North Rodeo Drive home in Beverly Hills, California in 1987 when he was 78 years old.
