= Academic grading in the United States =

In the United States, academic grading commonly takes on the form of five, six or seven letter grades. Traditionally, the grades are A+, A, A−, B+, B, B−, C+, C, C−, D+, D, D− and F, with A+ being the highest and F being lowest. In some cases, grades can also be numerical. Numeric-to-letter-grade conversions generally vary from system to system and between disciplines and status.

== Grades A–F in the United States ==
=== Numerical and letter grades ===
The typical letter grades awarded for participation in a course are (from highest to lowest) A, B, C, D and F. Variations on the traditional five-grade system allow for awarding A+, A, A−, B+, B, B−, C+, C, C−, D+, D, D−, and F. In primary and secondary schools, a D is usually the lowest passing grade. However, there are some schools that consider a C the lowest passing grade, so the general standard is that anything below a 60% or 70% is failing, depending on the grading scale. In post-secondary schools, such as college and universities, a D is considered to be an unsatisfactory passing grade. Students will usually still earn credit for the class if they get a D. However, a C or better may be required to count some major classes toward a degree, or to satisfy a prerequisite requirement for a class.

To assess individual students' grades across multiple courses, letter grades are typically assigned a numeric rank from which a mean grade (Grade Point Average or GPA) is calculated.

=== Percentage grades ===
The 100-point scale is a percentage-based grading system. In a percentage-based system, each assignment regardless of size, type, or complexity is given a percentage score: four correct answers out of five is a score of 80%. The overall grade for the class is then typically weighted so that the final grade represents a stated proportion of different types of work. For example, daily homework may be counted as 50% of the final grade, chapter quizzes may count for 20%, the comprehensive final exam may count for 20%, and a major project may count for the remaining 10%. Each are created to evaluate the students' understanding of the material and of their complex understanding of the course material.

=== Grade conversion ===
Below is the grading system found to be most commonly used in United States public high schools, according to the 2009 High School Transcript Study. This is the most used grading system; however, there are some schools that use an edited version of the college system. If the score is a decimal, it is rounded to the nearest integer, which means 89.5 or above becomes an A average, 79.5 becomes a B, and so on.

Letter Grade	Percentage	GPA
A	90–100%	4.0
B	80–89%	3.0
C	70–79%	2.0
D	60–69%	1.0
F	0–59%	0.0

Below is a grading system used by some colleges in the United States. Other schools use different systems, so this system is not universal. MIT, for example, uses a scale that goes up to 5.0.

Letter Grade	Percentage	GPA
A+	97–100%	4.0
A	93–96%	3.9
A−	90–92%	3.7
B+	87–89%	3.3
B	83–86%	3.0
B−	80–82%	2.7
C+	77–79%	2.3
C	73–76%	2.0
C−	70–72%	1.7
D+	67–69%	1.3
D	63–66%	1.0
D−	60–62%	0.7
F	0–59%	0.0

=== AF and XF ===
AF is a grade used at some U.S. colleges and universities to denote failure for non-attendance or withdrawing from a course after the refund period has lapsed. XF can also be used to denote students who are caught performing acts of academic dishonesty. The first school to popularize the XF grade was the University of Maryland. The general intent to assign an AF or XF grade is to make it evident from the transcript as to what caused the failing grade. Students at Wichita State University who did not wish for "F"s on their transcript to be mistaken for academic dishonesty, requested that their university adopt the XF grade. Students at Thomas Edison State University requested that XF grades that had been assigned because they missed the withdrawal deadline be omitted from official transcripts, leading to a policy change within the university. The request was sparked, in part, by inconsistent grading policies among universities issuing XF grades.

== Assessment ==
In elementary school, grades may represent rewards from teachers "for being friendly, prepared, compliant, a good school citizen, well-organized and hard-working" rather than mastering the subject material. Schools in the United States have been accused of using academic grades to penalize students for being bored, uncooperative or for talking out of turn. Usually, this behavior leads to poor or non-existent studying habits which most likely are to blame for their grades. Some teachers use self- and peer assessment to evaluate some of a student's progress and how behind they are compared to their peers.

=== Standards-based grading ===
Declines in test scores from 2015 through 2025 affected both rich and poor districts, and crossed racial and geographic divides. Declines were long-term, occurring not only during the COVID-19 pandemic.

With the adoption of standards-based education, most states have created examinations in which students are compared to a standard of what educators, employers, parents, and other stakeholders have determined to be what every student should know and be able to do. Students are graded as exceeding (4), meeting (3), approaching (2), and falling below (1) the standard. The advantage is that students are not compared against each other, and all have the opportunity to pass the standard. However, the standard is typically set at a level that is substantially higher than the previous achievement, so that a relatively high percentage of students fail at least some part of the standards in the first year, including an especially high percentage non-college-bound students.

The tests are targeted to items and skills not currently in the curriculum to promote the adoption of methods such as constructivist mathematics, inquiry-based science, and problem-solving.

Grades can be enhanced by extra credits, awarded where students undertake optional work, in addition to their compulsory school work.

For an example of standard-based grading, see "The 1-2-3-4 System" below.

=== Rank-based grading ===
Grading on a curve is any system wherein the group performance is used to moderate evaluation; it need not be strictly or purely rank-based.

In the most extreme form, students are ranked and grades are assigned according to a student's rank, placing students in direct competition with one another.

Grade	percentage of students receiving grade
A	fourth quintile (top 20%)
B	third quintile (20% - 40%)
C	second quintile (middle 20%)
D	first quintile (60% - 80%)
F	bottom 20%

One model uses percentages derived from a normal distribution model of educational performance. The top grade, A, is given here for performance that exceeds the mean by more than 1.5 standard deviations, a B for performance between 0.5 and 1.5 standard deviations above the mean, and so on. Regardless of the absolute performance of the students, the best score in the group receives a top grade and the worst score receives a failing grade.

Numerical values in America are applied to grades as shown below:

- A = 4
- B = 3
- C = 2
- D = 1

This allows grades to be easily averaged. Additionally, many schools add .33 for a plus (+) grade and subtract .33 for a minus (−) grade. Thus, a B+ yields a 3.33 whereas an A− yields a 3.67. A-plusses, if given, are usually assigned a value of 4.0 (equivalent to an A) due to the common assumption that a 4.00 is the best possible grade-point average, although 4.33 is awarded at some institutions. In some places, .25 or .3 instead of .33 is added for a plus grade and subtracted for a minus grade. Other institutions maintain a mid-grade and award .5 for the grade. For example, an AB would receive a 3.5-grade point and a BC would receive a 2.5-grade point.

=== Weighted GPA ===
Some high schools, to reflect the varying skill required for different course levels, will give higher numerical grades for difficult courses, often referred to as a weighted GPA. For example, two common conversion systems used in honors and Advanced Placement courses are:

- A = 5 or 4.5
- B = 4 or 3.5
- C = 3 or 2.5
- D = 2 or 1.5
- F = 0

Denver Public Schools uses a different system in honors and AP courses to get weighted GPA values; the scale is as follows:

- A = 5.2
- A− = 4.77
- B+ = 4.33
- B = 3.9
- B− = 3.47
- C+ = 3.0
- C = 2.6
- C− = 2.17
- D = 1.3
- F = 0.0

Another policy commonly used by 4.0-scale schools is to mimic the eleven-point weighted scale (see below) by adding a .33 (one-third of a letter grade) to honors or advanced placement class. (For example, a B in a regular class would be a 3.0, but in honors or AP class it would become a B+, or 3.33).

Sometimes the 5-based weighing scale is used for AP courses and the 4.6-based scale for honors courses, but often a school will choose one system and apply it universally to all advanced courses. A small number of high schools use a 5-point scale for Honors courses, a 6-point scale for AP courses, and/or a 3-point scale for courses of below average difficulty.

== Other systems ==
=== Six-point system ===
Phillips Academy at Andover, a boarding school in the United States, is an example of a school that uses the six-point system. While there are approximate equivalents to the 100 point system, grades are most often described as follows:

- 6 – Outstanding (High Honor)
- 5 – Superior (Honor)
- 4 – Good
- 3 – Satisfactory
- 2 – Low Pass, but certifying
- 1 – Low Failure
- 0 – Failure

Although listed above, grades below a 3 are rarely given in practice.

=== Eleven-point system ===
Phillips Exeter Academy and a few other high schools in the United States use an eleven-point system. Numerical values are applied to grades as follows:

- A = 11
- A− = 10
- B+ = 9
- B = 8
- B− = 7
- C+ = 6
- C = 5
- C− = 4
- D+ = 3
- D = 2
- D− = 1
- F = 0

Very few American high schools use a twelve-point system. The twelve-point system differs from the above only in using the grade A+, to which the value 12.0 is applied.

=== The 1-2-3-4 system ===
Some school districts use a 1-2-3-4 rating system for grades at the elementary (K–5) level, notably many California school districts including The Los Angeles Unified School District (LAUSD) which switched with the class of 2000. The four-point scale more clearly indicates proficiency levels in core subjects by segmenting students who are proficient (4&3) and ready to advance, from those who are not meeting all required standards (2&1) and should not advance. Most notably this removes the "C" rating which did not clearly partition students who should advance from those who should not.

Percentage	Grade/mark	Assigned meaning	Numeric grade
90–100	AL1	Exemplary	4.0
80–89	AL3 or AL2	Accomplished	3.0
70–79	AL5 or AL4	Developing	2.0
60–69	AL6 or AL5	Beginning	1.0
0–59	AL6 to AL8	Bad	0.0

=== Letter based systems ===
A popular grading system in the United States uses four or five letters, which are ranked in descending order:

- E (Excellent)
- G (Good)
- S (Satisfactory)
- N (Needs improvement)
- U (Unsatisfactory)
- H (High pass)
- I (Incomplete)

This system has largely been replaced by the six-point system discussed above, but is still encountered at the elementary school level, particularly in kindergarten and Grades 1 through 3 (these levels comprising the lower division of primary school). It is also occasionally used at schools for older children, including high schools, especially in the issuance of conduct or citizenship grades.

There are a multiple permutations and variations to this system. These may include the use of an O (for "outstanding") grade, which is even higher than the E; the use of an O instead of the E; the elimination of a G (for "good"); the use of a G (again for "good") instead of the E; the use of an L (for "lacks effort") instead of a U; and the lack of a U grade. In this version, E stands for "exemplary" and P proficient, with AE and AP for work that approaches the E and P levels. "Credit" is equivalent to the D level and "No Credit" is equivalent to F.

The use of M (for "mediocre") in place of the N and I (for "insufficient") in place of the U was used in some places, and included the F.

- E (Excellent)
- S (Satisfactory)
- M (Mediocre)
- I (Insufficient)
- F (Failure)

The S grade may be so modified with an S+ or S−, but otherwise plus and minus are rarely used.

Other lettering systems include:

- M (Meets standard)
- P (Progressing)
- E (Emerging)
- N (Standard Not Met)
- I (Inadequate Work)
- (blank) (No Scores in Gradebook)

A similar system is used to rank practical work in the certain science department of Oxford University; however only with the grades S (Satisfactory), S+ (more than satisfactory, and may be used in the allocation of degree grades) and NS (Not Satisfactory).

=== Alternative approaches to the academic grading system ===
Alternatives to letter-grading assessments have been tried in some schools, but still remain a marginal approach due to the heavy emphasis and history of letter grading. Alternatives to standard letter grading are able to evaluate the students skills and understanding of the course material. The flaws in the standard letter grading system are major and require a lot of attention. These issues include ways for students to achieve high grades without actually understanding the course material. They don't have any real understanding of the complex information taught in the class. Kyle Spencer discusses an issue a high school teacher discovered during his time teaching. The issue was on test his students were able to achieve high grades yet when presented with a complex question they couldn't get it correct. Showing him that they only have a general understanding of the material which wasn't reflected by the grades they received.

A number of liberal arts colleges in the U.S. either do not issue grades at all (such as Alverno College, Antioch College, Bennington College, Evergreen State College, New College of Florida, and Hampshire College), de-emphasize them (St. John's College, Reed College, Sarah Lawrence College, Prescott College, College of the Atlantic), or do not calculate grade point averages (Brown University). In many cases, narrative evaluations are used as an alternative measurement system. Saint Ann's School in Brooklyn is one of several secondary schools to eschew grades in favor of narrative reports, while still managing to be the number one high school in the country for having the highest percentage of graduating seniors enroll in Ivy League and several other highly selective colleges.

=== Additional collegiate grades ===
- FN = Failure for Non-Attendance
- W = Withdrawal
- DW = Disciplinary Withdrawal
- WP = Withdrawal (had a passing grade at the time of withdrawal)
- WF = Withdrawal (had a failing grade at the time of withdrawal)
- UW = Unofficial Withdrawal
- X/V = Audit/Exemption
- NR = Not Reported by Instructor
- E = Excellent

The FN grade indicates that a student has failed a course due to non-attendance. It is calculated as an "F" in the student's grade point average. For students receiving financial aid, failure for non-attendance may require the student to refund to the college all or part of their aid. The FN grade will be assigned by the faculty member at any time following the final withdrawal date for the course. Students who are in a failing status because of non-attendance but return to the course prior to the withdrawal date may elect to withdraw from the course.

A grade of "W" indicates that a student has elected to withdraw from a course prior to the course's withdraw deadline. It is not calculated in the student's grade point average, which would keep the student from facing possible academic disciplinary action if they were to fall below the required Standards of Academic Progress (SAP). For students receiving financial aid, a grade of "W" may require the student to refund to the college all or part of their aid. Some schools indicate whether the student was passing or failing the course at the time of withdrawal by placing WP or WF grades on the transcript; policies vary as to whether a WF counts as an unsatisfactory grade when determining if a student is in good standing.

Standards for Academic Progress in Florida, for example, require a student to maintain a grade point average of 2.00 on the 4.00 scale. The student must also successfully complete 67% of the courses attempted, which includes previous failures, re-takes, and withdrawals. Additionally, a student may not attempt a course more than three times.

=== Course audits ===
Students may elect to audit a college credit course or workforce credit course by completing the audit form. Students may not change from credit to audit or from audit to credit after the drop deadline. A grade of 'X' will be assigned for all courses taken in audit status.

No credit will be awarded and fees for college credit courses taken on an audit basis are the same as those taken on a college credit or workforce credit basis.

Courses taken for audit do not count as hours enrolled in the following areas: veteran certification, financial aid awards, Social Security certification, international student enrollment requirements or early admission program enrollment requirements.

=== Standards of Academic Progress (SAP) ===
Standards of Academic Progress are the standards set by the school, state, Board of Education, or other agency which are required of students to adhere to in order to continue to attend classes. A student who falls below the SAP may have disciplinary action taken against them or denial of financial aid until the student has met the required SAP. In Florida, Standards of Academic Progress require a student to maintain a grade point average of 2.00 or above on the 4.00 numeric grading scale. The student must also finish 67% of the courses attempted, which includes previous failures, re-takes, and withdrawals. Additionally, a student may not attempt a course more than three times.

In addition to GPA and course completion requirements, some institutions include specific benchmarks for individual courses or program components as part of SAP. These may involve maintaining minimum grades in core subjects, meeting credit-hour thresholds each term, or successfully completing remedial coursework if necessary. Schools may also implement probationary periods for students who temporarily fall below SAP standards, providing guidance and academic support to help them regain satisfactory status. Failure to meet SAP after such interventions can result in suspension or dismissal, as well as ineligibility for federal and state financial aid programs until the student meets the required standards.

=== Seven point scale ===
The seven point scale uses 7 percentages between each letter grade. Occasionally, if it is 0.5 below the actual number (–0.5 shown below) then it will round up. The possible grades are A, B, C, D, F, and I, which stands for incomplete.

Percentage	Grade/mark
98.5–100	A+
95.5–98.49	A
92.5–95.49	A–
89.5–92.49	B+
86.5–89.49	B
84.5–86.49	B–
82.5–84.49	C+
79.5–82.49	C
76.5–79.49	C–
74.5–76.49	D+
72.5–74.49	D
69.7–72.49	D–
0.5–69.69	F
0	I

== See also ==
- Academic dishonesty
- Grading in education
