= The Ultimate Collection (Johnny Mathis album) =

Compilation album by Johnny Mathis
- Released: October 10, 2011
- Recorded: 1956–2010
- Genre: Vocal; R&B; stage & screen; pop/rock
- Length: 1:15:35
- Label: Sony Music Entertainment

Johnny Mathis chronology
Let It Be Me: Mathis in Nashville (2010)	The Ultimate Collection (2011)	Sending You a Little Christmas (2013)

The Ultimate Collection is a compilation album by American pop singer Johnny Mathis that was released in the UK in 2011 by Sony Music Entertainment and reached number 17 on the UK albums chart that same year. This collection has 13 of his 17 UK singles chart entries as well as two tracks from his unreleased 1981 album I Love My Lady: the title song and "Something to Sing About".

== Track listing ==
1. "Too Much, Too Little, Too Late" performed with Deniece Williams (Nat Kipner, John Vallins) – 2:59
2. "Misty" (Johnny Burke, Erroll Garner) – 3:34
3. "The Twelfth of Never" (Jerry Livingston, Paul Francis Webster) – 2:28
4. "Maria" (Leonard Bernstein, Stephen Sondheim) – 3:45
5. "Chances Are" (Robert Allen, Al Stillman) – 3:03
6. "A Certain Smile" (Sammy Fain, Paul Francis Webster) – 2:47
7. "It's Not for Me to Say" (Robert Allen, Al Stillman) – 3:05
8. "Teacher, Teacher" (Robert Allen, Al Stillman) – 2:38
9. "My Love for You" (Abner Silver, Sid Wayne) – 3:07
10. "The Best of Everything" (Sammy Cahn, Alfred Newman) – 2:45
11. "Someone" (William J. Tennyson, Jr.) – 2:58
12. "You Are Beautiful" (Oscar Hammerstein II, Richard Rodgers) – 3:10
13. "What Will Mary Say" (Eddie Snyder, Paul Vance) – 3:09
14. "Crazy" (Willie Nelson) - 3:27
15. "Love Me Tender" (Vera Matson, Elvis Presley) - 3:37
16. "When Will I See You Again" (Kenny Gamble, Leon Huff) – 2:35
17. "I'm Stone in Love with You" (Anthony Bell, Thom Bell, Linda Creed) – 3:30
18. "You're All I Need to Get By" performed with Deniece Williams (Nickolas Ashford, Valerie Simpson) - 2:40
19. "Gone, Gone, Gone" (L. Russell Brown, Lisa Hayward) – 3:32
20. "Something to Sing About" (Bernard Edwards, Nile Rodgers) – 4:13
21. "The First Time Ever (I Saw Your Face)" (Ewan MacColl) – 3:36
22. "When a Child Is Born" (Ciro Dammicco, Fred Jay) – 3:41
23. "I Love My Lady" (Bernard Edwards, Nile Rodgers) – 5:26

== Personnel ==
- Johnny Mathis – vocals
