= Ready Take One =

2016 compilation album by Erroll Garner

Compilation album by Erroll Garner
- Released: September 30, 2016
- Recorded: 1967–1971
- Genre: Jazz
- Length: 65:53
- Label: Legacy
- Producer: Martha Glaser, Geri Allen, Peter Lockhart, Susan Rosenberg, Steve Rosenthal

Erroll Garner chronology
| The Complete Concert By the Sea (2015) | Ready Take One (2016) |

Ready Take One is a compilation album of previously unreleased recordings of pianist Erroll Garner. The album was released in 2016 by Legacy, with songs pulled from sessions in 1967, 1969, and 1971. The album was given favorable reviews by numerous publications, including The Wall Street Journal.

== Track listing ==
1. "High Wire" (Erroll Garner) – 3:47
2. "I Want to Be Happy" (Irving Caesar, Otto Harbach, Vincent Youmans) – 3:00
3. "I'm Confessin' (That I Love You)" (Doc Daugherty, Al J. Neiburg, Ellis Reynolds) – 5:02
4. "Sunny" (Bobby Hebb) – 3:19
5. "Wild Music" (Erroll Garner) – 5:06
6. "Caravan" (Duke Ellington, Irving Mills, Juan Tizol) – 6:23
7. "Back to You" (Erroll Garner) – 5:25
8. "Night and Day (Cole Porter) – 4:25
9. "Chase Me" (Erroll Garner) – 2:57
10. "Satin Doll" (Duke Ellington, Johnny Mercer, Billy Strayhorn) – 5:51
11. "Latin Digs" (Erroll Garner) – 5:27
12. "Stella by Starlight" (Ned Washington, Victor Young) – 4:50
13. "Down Wylie Avenue" (Erroll Garner) – 5:29
14. "Misty" (Erroll Garner, Johnny Burke) – 4:52

== Personnel ==
Music

- Erroll Garner – piano
- Ernest McCarty, George Duvivier, Ike Isaacs, Larry Gales – double bass
- Jimmie Smith, Joe Cocuzzo – drums
- José Mangual – congas

Production

- Chuck Stewart – photography
- Dan Morgenstern, James Doran, Robin D.G. Kelley – liner notes
- Doug Bleek – transfer engineer
- Emma Munger – assistant producer
- Geri Allen – compilation producer, producer, liner notes
- Henry Towns – artists and repertoire
- Kabir Hermon – mixing engineer
- Martha Glaser – original recording producer
- Michael Mercurio – transfer engineer
- Peter Lockhart – compilation producer, producer, mixing engineer
- Steve Rosenthal – compilation producer, mixing engineer
- Susan Rosenberg – executive producer, producer
- Tara Master – production director
- Vic Anesini – mastering engineer
