= Someone =

Someone may refer to:

== Literature ==
- Someone (McDermott novel), a 2013 novel by Alice McDermott

== Songs ==
- "Someone" (Lee Greenwood song), 1987
- "Someone" (The Rembrandts song), 1991
- "Someone" (SWV song), 1997
- "Someone (Laissons nous une chance)", by Hanson and Emma Daumas, 2005
- "Someone" (Lucy Spraggan song), 2012
- "Someone" (Kelly Clarkson song), 2015
- "Someone", from More Johnny's Greatest Hits, 1959
- "Someone", by Air Supply from News from Nowhere, 1995
- "Someone", by Earshot from Two, 2004
- "Someone", by Jolin Tsai from Muse, 2012
- "Someone", by the Mekons from The Mekons Rock 'n Roll, 1989
- "Someone", by the Rembrandts from The Rembrandts, 1990

== Other uses ==
- Someone (film), a 2016 Japanese film

== See also ==
- Somebody (disambiguation)
- Indefinite pronoun
