= Small World (song) =

Song by Ethel Merman

from the album Gypsy – A Musical Fable
- Released: 1959
- Recorded: 1959
- Genre: Show tune
- Length: 2:15
- Label: Columbia Masterworks
- Composer: Jule Styne
- Lyricist: Stephen Sondheim

"Small World" is a popular song written by Stephen Sondheim and Jule Styne for the 1959 Broadway musical Gypsy. A recording of the song by Johnny Mathis was a top 20 hit in the US.

== In Gypsy ==
"Small World" by Ethel Merman
"Small World" demonstrates Rose's determination to "get what she wants".

"Small World" is performed by the character Rose, a stage mother who wants a former talent agent, Herbie, to become the manager of her two daughters, who play the vaudeville circuit around the United States in the early 1920s. In his book The Making of Gypsy, Keith Garebian described "Small World" as "cunning because as Rose sings to Herbie about their similarities despite differences, we note how quickly she moves from A to Z in order to hook him as a life-partner." He concluded, "It is a small song but the lyrical impulse suggests her power to dominate a situation." Stacy Ellen Wolf provided another analysis of the lyrics:

The song is built on linguistic repetitions and extensions, as well as the internal rhymes of "common" and "phenomenon", "resources" and "forces", finally returning to the original rhyme with "from now on." The effect approximates Rose's thought process; she continually revises her approach to get what she wants.

Robert W. Schneider wrote that "Small World" provided the actresses who have played Rose with room to present the character as they saw her:

In 1959, Ethel Merman played the song with matter-of-fact optimism. Angela Lansbury (1974) imbued it with warm gratitude while Tyne Daly (1989) charged the song with sexuality. Bernadette Peters (2003) gave us sweetness, Patti Lupone (2008) provided humorous pragmaticism, and the West End's Imelda Staunton (2015) preyed upon Herbie's vulnerability. Regardless of which tactic you prefer, it underlines the idea that Gypsy is a libretto in which there is nuance, subtlety, and many different valid roads for interpretation.

"Small World"
- US 7-inch single

Single by Johnny Mathis

from the album More Johnny's Greatest Hits
- B-side: "You Are Everything to Me"
- Released: May 25, 1959
- Recorded: April 29, 1959
- Genre: Pop
- Length: 3:20
- Label: Columbia
- Songwriters: Stephen Sondheim; Jule Styne
- Producer: Al Ham

Johnny Mathis singles chronology
"Someone" / "Very Much in Love" (1959)	"Small World" / "You Are Everything to Me" (1959)	"Misty" / "The Story of Our Love" (1959)

Music video
- "Small World" on YouTube

== Johnny Mathis recording and release ==
In the liner notes for his 1993 box set The Music of Johnny Mathis: A Personal Collection, Mathis is quoted as saying, "I was fortunate in that Columbia Records got heavily into Broadway shows, putting money into them and recording them. Goddard Lieberson, who was then the head of Columbia, was my salvation. He brought all these wonderful show songs for me to sing … including the songs from Gypsy." Mathis recorded "Small World" on April 29, 1959, with an orchestra conducted by Glenn Osser. It was produced by Al Ham and released as a single on May 25 of that year, less than a week after the musical's first preview and opening night performance on Broadway.

Garebian noted how lyricist Stephen Sondheim was unwilling to alter his choice of words: "For 'Small World', he had written: 'Lucky, I'm a woman with children ....' Styne gasped because such a lyric would mean that no male could ever sing or record the song. 'So?' responded Sondheim, who refused to change the line." Mathis sings it as, "Lucky, 'cause I'd love to have children", and changes the word man that Rose uses about Herbie to girl.

A friend of Sondheim's, Leonard Bernstein, later pointed out to Mathis that he sang the part of the melody incorrectly (the part with the line "Small world, isn't it?"). Bernstein said he preferred how the singer did it, but Mathis later said in an interview, "And, of course, he was being nice."

== Commercial performance ==
"Small World" debuted on the Billboard Hot 100 in the issue of the magazine dated June 15, 1959, and peaked at number 20 eight weeks later, the week ending August 10. The song stayed on the Hot 100 for 15 weeks. It reached number 19 on Cash Box magazine's best seller list.

== Awards and accolades ==
Peter Filichia's The Book of Broadway Musical Debates, Disputes, and Disagreements has a section titled, "If the Tonys Had a Category for Best Song, What Would Have Won?" For the 1959–1960 season he wrote, "Johnny Mathis's top twenty hit would have helped Gypsy to win its one and only Tony." The recording earned Styne and Sondheim a Grammy nomination for Song of the Year at the 2nd Annual Grammy Awards in 1960.

== Critical reception ==
In their review column, the editors of Cash Box magazine featured the single as their Pick of the Week, which was their equivalent to a letter grade of A for both songs. They wrote that "Small World" and its B-side, "You Are Everything to Me", were "first-rate" and that "the distinctive Mathis touch gets to the heart of each". The editors of Billboard categorized the single as a "Spotlight Winner", one of the best of the week's new releases, and wrote that both songs were handled "with warmth over pretty ork backing."

== Charts ==
Weekly chart performance for "Small World" by Johnny Mathis
Chart (1959)	Peak position
US Billboard Hot 100	20
US Top 100 Best Selling Tunes on Records (Cash Box)	19

== Notable cover versions ==
Various versions of "Small World" have been singled out in reviews of the albums on which the song appeared. The editors of Cashbox described Anita Bryant's 1959 rendition as one of the "lovelies" on her self-titled album. They described an instrumental version by George Melachrino on his 1963 album Our Man in London as "delightful".

Regarding the version on Pat Suzuki's 1960 album Looking at You, the editors of Billboard wrote, "She handles the ballads with warmth and meaning, especially such items as …. 'Small World'." They highlighted the recording of the song by Annie Ross with Buddy Bregman and his Orchestra on their 1962 album Gypsy as one of "the better tracks".

AllMusic critics have also commented in reviews on various versions of the song. In his critique of Herb Geller's 1959 album of songs from Gypsy, Jason Ankeny wrote, "Geller maintains the spirit and integrity of indelible Sondheim melodies like …. 'Small World'." William Ruhlmann panned Bette Midler's overall performance on the soundtrack to the 1993 television version of the musical but described her rendition of the song as "fine". In reviewing Richie Vitale's 2000 album Shake It, Dave Nathan wrote, "Vitale's interest in music from the Broadway stage explains the presence of 'Small World', which comes close to being a classical brass quintet performance."

== Bibliography ==
- Filichia, Peter (2022), The Book of Broadway Musical Debates, Disputes, and Disagreements, Rowman & Littlefield, ISBN 9781493067947
- Garebian, Keith (1994), The Making of Gypsy, ECW Press, ISBN 9781550221923
- O'Neil, Thomas (1999), The Grammys, Perigree Books, ISBN 0-39952-477-0
- Whitburn, Joel (2014), Joel Whitburn's Cash Box Pop Hits 1952-1996, Record Research Inc., ISBN 978-0-89820-209-0
- Wolf, Stacy Ellen (2002), A Problem Like Maria: Gender and Sexuality in the American Musical, University of Michigan Press, ISBN 0-472-09772-5
