= Heavenly (Johnny Mathis album) =

Studio album by Johnny Mathis
- Released: August 10, 1959
- Recorded: April 16, 1959; April 20–21, 1959
- Studio: CBS 30th Street Studio; New York City
- Genre: Vocal
- Length: 48:03
- Label: Columbia
- Producer: Mitch Miller; Al Ham

Johnny Mathis chronology
More Johnny's Greatest Hits (1959)	Heavenly (1959)	Faithfully (1959)

Singles from Heavenly
- 1. "Misty" Released: September 14, 1959

Alternate cover
- UK album cover

Heavenly is an album by American pop singer Johnny Mathis that was released on August 10, 1959, by Columbia Records and marked his return to recording ballads with orchestral accompaniment. Along with the material that others had covered before are two new songs: the title track and "I'll Be Easy to Find".

The album debuted on Billboard magazine's album chart in the September 21, 1959, issue to begin a run of 295 weeks, five of which were spent at number one. It debuted on the Cash Box albums chart in the issue dated September 5, 1969, and remained on the chart for in a total of 103 weeks, spending 14 weeks at number one. Because the UK version of his 1958 LP Good Night, Dear Lord was retitled Heavenly, Fontana Records issued this album there under a different title, Ride on a Rainbow, which got as high as number 10 on the UK album chart in February 1960 where it stay on the charts for 2 weeks. The US version of Heavenly received Gold certification from the Recording Industry Association of America for sales of 500,000 copies in the US on December 4, 1962, and Platinum certification for one million in sales was awarded on November 21, 1986.

This was the first Mathis LP to have a single released in the US. His cover of "Misty" made its first appearance on the Billboard Hot 100 chart in the issue dated October 5, 1959, and peaked at number 12 during its 17 weeks there. It also began a run of seven weeks on the magazine's R&B chart the following month, in the November 9 issue, and reached number 10 number 14 on the Cashbox singles chart during its 17 weeks there. and started 12 weeks on the UK singles chart in February 1960, where it also reached number 12. The song was inducted into the Grammy Hall of Fame in 2002. This special Grammy Award category was established in 1973 to honor recordings that are at least 25 years old and that have "qualitative or historical significance."

The album was released for the first time on compact disc in 1990 and was part of a 1995 three-disc set that included the 1958 compilation Johnny's Greatest Hits and his 1984 concert album Live. Heavenly was also included in Legacy's Mathis box set The Voice of Romance: The Columbia Original Album Collection, which was released on December 8, 2017.

== Reception ==
Professional ratings
Review scores
Source	Rating
Allmusic	4.5/5 stars
The Encyclopedia of Popular Music	4/5 stars
Disc	4/5 stars

Allmusic's William Ruhlmann asserted that "this record is the epitome of Mathis's approach to music." Further description was generous with praise. "The tempos are slow, the strings swell, and Mathis' vulnerable tenor, dripping with tender emotion yet never missing a beat, soars and swoops over all." He found "Misty" to be a good choice, with its "newly added lyric by Johnny Burke. Few could have carried off that lyric (go ahead, try and think of another male singer of the '50s who could handle it), but it was perfect for Mathis." He also notes that after ten albums released in three years Mathis was "a recording veteran while still being fresh enough to give his performances real feeling."

Cashbox notes "Twelve superior ballads are delivered in the soft, warm tones of Mathis, making another excellent package to be devoured by his huge following."

Variety reported that the album showed "The mood is strongly romantic and the Glenn Osser arrangements give the Mathis style a special boost."

Ken Graham of Disc described the album as "outstandingly good."

In his book Burt Bacharach, Song by Song: The Ultimate Burt Bacharach Reference for Fans, Serious Record Collectors, and Music Critics, Serene Dominic commented on the title track from this album, which was co-written by Bacharach. "Oddly enough for such a popular album cut, no one saw the logic in trying to capitalize on 'Heavenly' as a single. The absence of cover versions demonstrated either that no one else felt Mathis's rendition could be bettered or that its charms seemed threadbare in less capable hands."

== Track listing ==
=== Side one ===
1. "Heavenly" (Burt Bacharach, Sydney Shaw) – 3:23
2. "Hello, Young Lovers" from The King and I (Richard Rodgers, Oscar Hammerstein) – 4:18
3. "A Lovely Way to Spend an Evening" (Harold Adamson, Jimmy McHugh) – 4:04
4. "A Ride on a Rainbow" from the Producers' Showcase episode "Ruggles of Red Gap" (Leo Robin, Jule Styne) – 4:11
5. "More Than You Know" from Great Day (Vincent Youmans, Edward Eliscu, Billy Rose) – 4:18
6. "Something I Dreamed Last Night" (Sammy Fain, Herbert Magidson, Jack Yellen) – 4:32

=== Side two ===
1. "Misty" (Erroll Garner, Johnny Burke) – 3:38
2. "Stranger in Paradise" from Kismet (George Forrest, Robert Wright) – 4:06
3. "Moonlight Becomes You" from Road to Morocco (Johnny Burke, Jimmy Van Heusen) – 4:06
4. "They Say It's Wonderful" from Annie Get Your Gun (Irving Berlin) – 3:33
5. "I'll Be Easy to Find" (Bart Howard)– 4:04
6. "That's All" (Alan Brandt, Bob Haymes) – 3:50

== Recording dates ==
From the liner notes for The Voice of Romance: The Columbia Original Album Collection:

- April 16, 1959 — "Hello, Young Lovers", "Moonlight Becomes You", "More Than You Know", "They Say It's Wonderful"
- April 20, 1959 — "Heavenly", "A Lovely Way to Spend an Evening", "A Ride on a Rainbow", "Stranger in Paradise"
- April 21, 1959 — "I'll Be Easy to Find", "Misty", "Something I Dreamed Last Night", "That's All"

== Personnel ==
- Johnny Mathis – vocals
- Mitch Miller – producer
- Al Ham – producer
- Glenn Osser – arranger and conductor
- Ralph Wolfe Cowan – cover painting

== Bibliography ==
- Dominic, Serene (2003), Burt Bacharach, Song by Song: The Ultimate Burt Bacharach Reference for Fans, Serious Record Collectors, and Music Critics, Music Sales Group, ISBN 0825672805
- Whitburn, Joel (2004), Joel Whitburn Presents Top R&B/Hip-Hop Singles, 1942-2004, Record Research Inc., ISBN 0898201608
- Whitburn, Joel (2009), Joel Whitburn's Top Pop Singles, 1955-2008, Record Research Inc., ISBN 0898201802
- Whitburn, Joel (2010), Joel Whitburn Presents Top Pop Albums, Seventh Edition, Record Research Inc., ISBN 0-89820-183-7
- Hoffmann, Frank W (1988), The Cash box album charts, 1955-1974, Scarecrow Press, ISBN 0-810-82005-6
- Downey, Pat (1994), Cash box pop singles charts, 1950-1993, Libraries Unlimited, ISBN 1-56308-316-7
