= Contrasts (Erroll Garner album) =

Studio album by Erroll Garner
- Released: December 1954
- Recorded: July 27, 1954
- Studio: Universal Recording Studio, Chicago, IL
- Genre: Jazz
- Length: 62:43
- Label: EmArcy

Erroll Garner chronology
Concert by the Sea (1955)	Contrasts (1954)	Solitaire (1955)

Professional ratings
Review scores
Source	Rating
Allmusic	4/5 stars
The Penguin Guide to Jazz Recordings	3.5/4 stars

Contrasts is a 1954 studio album by Erroll Garner. Giving it a four-star rating, Scott Yanow of AllMusic wrote: "Erroll Garner never recorded an uninspired solo, and this CD is as good a place as any to explore his joyful music.". The album was issued on compact disc in 1988 under the title The Original Misty with a different track ordering.

== Track listing ==
Original LP

1. "You Are My Sunshine" (Jimmie Davis, Charles Mitchell) – 3:26
2. "I've Got the World on a String" (Harold Arlen, Ted Koehler) – 3:58
3. "7-11 Jump" (Erroll Garner) – 7:16
4. "Part Time Blues" (Garner) – 4:31
5. "Rosalie" (Cole Porter) – 2:35
6. "In a Mellow Tone" (Duke Ellington, Milt Gabler) – 4:17
7. "Don't Worry 'Bout Me" (Rube Bloom, Koehler) – 5:01
8. "(All of a Sudden) My Heart Sings" (Jean Marie Blanvillain, Henri Herpin, Harold Rome) – 3:19
9. "There's a Small Hotel" (Lorenz Hart, Richard Rodgers) – 3:08
10. "Misty" (Garner) – 2:45
11. "I've Got to Be a Rug Cutter" (Duke Ellington) – 2:19

Bonus tracks (CD reissue)

12. "Sweet and Lovely" (Gus Arnheim, Jules LeMare, Harry Tobias) – 3:53
13. "Exactly Like You" (Dorothy Fields, Jimmy McHugh) – 3:10

== Personnel ==
- Erroll Garner - piano
- Wyatt Ruther - double bass
- Fats Heard - drums
- Candido Camero - percussion/congas on track 12
