= Let's Love (Johnny Mathis song) =

- US 7-inch single

Single by Johnny Mathis

from the album More Johnny's Greatest Hits
- B-side: "You Are Beautiful"
- Released: December 1, 1958
- Recorded: September 26, 1958
- Genre: Pop
- Length: 2:44
- Label: Columbia
- Songwriters: Richard Ferraris; Norman Kaye
- Producers: Al Ham; Mitch Miller

Johnny Mathis singles chronology
"Call Me" (1958)	"Let's Love" / "You Are Beautiful" (1958)	"Someone" / "Very Much in Love" (1959)

Music video
- "Let's Love" on YouTube

"Let's Love" is a popular song written by Richard Ferraris and Norman Kaye. It was recorded by Johnny Mathis in 1958 and charted in 1959.

== Recording and release ==
Johnny Mathis recorded "Let's Love" on September 26, 1958, with an orchestra conducted by Ray Ellis. It was produced by Al Ham and Mitch Miller and released as a single on December 1 of that year with the B-side "You Are Beautiful" from the 1958 Rodgers and Hammerstein musical Flower Drum Song.

== Commercial performance ==
"Let's Love" debuted on the Billboard Hot 100 in the issue of the magazine dated January 5, 1959, and peaked at number 44 the week ending February 2, 1959. The song charted there for 9 weeks. It also reached number 40 on Cash Box magazine's best seller list.

== Critical reception ==
In their review column, the editors of Cash Box magazine featured the single as their Disk of the Week, which was their equivalent to a letter grade of A for both songs. They described Mathis's recording of "Let's Love" as "a smart rhythm romancer handled in class fashion by the pro. Swinging number that has all the earmarks of tremendous money-maker both in sales and in performances." The editors of Billboard described it as "a swinger, neatly belted with moving backing from the Ray Ellis crew."

== Charts ==
Weekly chart performance for "Let's Love"
Chart (1959)	Peak position
US Billboard Hot 100	44
US Top 100 Best Selling Tunes on Records (Cash Box)	40

== Bibliography ==
- Whitburn, Joel (2014), Joel Whitburn's Cash Box Pop Hits 1952-1996, Record Research Inc., ISBN 978-0-89820-209-0
