= Concert by the Sea =

Live album by Erroll Garner
- Released: October 13, 1955
- Recorded: September 19, 1955
- Venues: Sunset School, Carmel-by-the-Sea, California
- Genre: Jazz
- Length: 41:19
- Label: Columbia
- Producer: George Avakian

Erroll Garner chronology
| Solo (1955) | Concert by the Sea (1955) | The Most Happy Piano (1956) |

Concert by the Sea is a live album by pianist Erroll Garner that was released by Columbia in 1955. It sold over a million dollars' worth of retail copies by 1958, qualifying for gold record status by the definition of that time but has never been acknowledged as such by the RIAA.

== Recording and music ==
The album was recorded on September 19, 1955, in the gothic-revivalist styled assembly hall of Sunset School (now Sunset Center) in Carmel-by-the-Sea, California, a welcoming space being used as part of local promoter Jimmy Lyons' "Sunset Series", this series in turn laying the groundwork for the beginnings of the Monterey Jazz Festival. From nearby Fort Ord military base servicemen were bused to join the enthusiastic and receptive audience at this Erroll Garner Trio gig. Accompanying Garner were bassist Eddie Calhoun and drummer Denzil Best. According to Columbia Records and its owner, Sony Music Entertainment, the acoustics were poor and the piano somewhat out of tune. The balance of instruments on the recording was also poor; the bass and drums were receded.

There was no plan to record the concert officially. The release came about because Garner's personal manager, Martha Glaser, spotted backstage that a tape recorder was running. The recording was being made by a recording engineer for the Armed Forces Radio Network, "a jazz fan and scholar named Will Thornbury, strictly for the enjoyment of himself and his fellow servicemen". Glaser took the tape, put it into album form, and then played it for the head of Columbia Records' jazz division, George Avakian, who decided to release it. The original LP was released by Columbia as catalog number CL 883; an "electronically rechanneled to simulate stereo" version, with catalog number CS 9821, was issued in 1969.

== Album cover ==
The original U.S. album cover photograph, showing a model in mid-stride with outstretched arms, (Kane's wife, June Kane, a popular model at the time), was shot by music and fashion photographer Art Kane, who later photographed the 1958 group portrait of jazz musicians known as A Great Day in Harlem. Music journalist Marc Myers wrote that "[f]rom an aesthetic standpoint, Art Kane's [Concert by the Sea] cover had grace, movement and drama. White or black, the model featured was in ecstasy, telegraphing that the music inside was happy and guaranteed to raise your spirits."

A 1970 U.S. reissue of Concert by the Sea introduced a new photograph (not taken by Kane), which reused Kane's concept, but with a model wearing bell-bottom pants and a hippie-style tunic shirt blouse. The 2015 release of the entire concert again paid tribute to Kane's original photograph, showing a model with outstretched arms standing in front of a rocky shoreline. International releases of the album have used a variety of cover photographs.

== Reception ==
Professional ratings
Review scores
| Source | Rating |
|---|---|
| AllMusic | 5/5 stars |
| The Encyclopedia of Popular Music | 5/5 stars |
| The Penguin Guide to Jazz | 3.5/4 stars |
| The Rolling Stone Jazz Record Guide | 5/5 stars |

AllMusic awarded the album a maximum five stars, observing that it is "arguably the finest record pianist Erroll Garner ever made". The Penguin Guide to Jazz gave it 3½ stars out of 4 (and added it to the book's suggested Core Collection), asserting that: "Concert by the Sea is essentially neither more nor less than a characteristic set by the trio". Critic Scott Yanow's opinion is: "this is the album that made such a strong impression that Garner was considered immortal from then on."

== 2015 reissue ==
On September 18, 2015, Sony Legacy released the album in an expanded box set version titled The Complete Concert by the Sea. Its three compact discs include the unedited full concert on discs one and two, with 11 tunes that did not appear on the original album, the original release remastered, and a 14-minute post-concert interview on disc three. The New York Times wrote: "the set will double the available music from the concert, shedding new light on Garner in what is often considered his finest hour."

== Track listing ==
Side one
| No. | Title | Writer(s) | Length |
|---|---|---|---|
| 1. | "I'll Remember April" | Gene de Paul, Patricia Johnston, Don Raye | 4:14 |
| 2. | "Teach Me Tonight" | Sammy Cahn, Gene de Paul | 3:37 |
| 3. | "Mambo Carmel" | Erroll Garner | 3:43 |
| 4. | "Autumn Leaves" | Joseph Kosma, Jacques Prévert, Johnny Mercer | 6:27 |
| 5. | "It's All Right with Me" | Cole Porter | 3:40 |

Side two
| No. | Title | Writer(s) | Length |
|---|---|---|---|
| 1. | "Red Top" | Lionel Hampton, Ben Kynard | 3:11 |
| 2. | "April in Paris" | Vernon Duke, Yip Harburg | 4:47 |
| 3. | "They Can't Take That Away from Me" | George Gershwin, Ira Gershwin | 4:08 |
| 4. | "How Could You Do a Thing Like That to Me" | Tyree Glenn, Allan Roberts | 3:59 |
| 5. | "Where or When" | Richard Rodgers, Lorenz Hart | 3:06 |
| 6. | "Erroll's Theme" | Erroll Garner | 0:46 |

2015 reissue bonus track
| No. | Title | Interview by Will Thornberry | Length |
|---|---|---|---|
| 12. | "Interview" | with Erroll Garner, Eddie Calhoun, Denzil Best | 14:10 |

2015 bonus disc one
| No. | Title | Writer(s) | Length |
|---|---|---|---|
| 1. | "Announcer Jimmy Lyons" | | 0:41 |
| 2. | "Night and Day" | Cole Porter | 5:04 |
| 3. | "Spring Is Here" | Richard Rodgers, Lorenz Hart | 5:14 |
| 4. | "I'll Remember April" | Gene de Paul, Patricia Johnston, Don Raye | 4:23 |
| 5. | "The Nearness of You" | Hoagy Carmichael, Ned Washington | 4:46 |
| 6. | "Where or When" | Richard Rodgers, Lorenz Hart | 3:22 |
| 7. | "Sweet and Lovely" | Gus Arnheim, Harry Tobias, Jules LeMare | 4:12 |
| 8. | "Lullaby of Birdland" | George Shearing, George David Weiss | 4:17 |
| 9. | "Mambo Carmel" | Erroll Garner | 3:52 |
| 10. | "Teach Me Tonight" | Sammy Cahn, Gene de Paul | 3:48 |
| 11. | "Will You Still Be Mine" | Tom Adair, Matt Dennis | 3:56 |
| 12. | "I Cover the Waterfront" | Johnny Green, Edward Heyman | 3:30 |
| 13. | "Bernie's Tune" | Bernie Miller, Jerry Leiber, Mike Stoller | 4:38 |
| 14. | "How Could You do a Thing Like That to Me" | Tyree Glenn, Allan Roberts | 4:16 |
| 15. | "It's All Right With Me" | Cole Porter | 3:51 |

2015 bonus disc two
| No. | Title | Writer(s) | Length |
|---|---|---|---|
| 1. | "Announcer Jimmy Lyons" | | 2:49 |
| 2. | "They Can't Take That Away from Me" | George Gershwin, Ira Gershwin | 4:19 |
| 3. | "Autumn Leaves" | Joseph Kosma, Jacques Prévert, Johnny Mercer | 6:41 |
| 4. | "S'Wonderful" | George Gershwin, Ira Gershwin | 2:38 |
| 5. | "Laura" | David Raksin, Johnny Mercer | 6:04 |
| 6. | "Red Top" | Lionel Hampton, Ben Kynard | 3:29 |
| 7. | "April in Paris" | Vernon Duke, Yip Harburg | 4:55 |
| 8. | "Caravan" | Juan Tizol | 7:43 |
| 9. | "Erroll's Theme" | Erroll Garner | 2:32 |

== Personnel ==
- Erroll Garner – piano
- Eddie Calhoun – bass
- Denzil Best – drums
