= Eddie Calhoun =

American jazz musician

Eddie Calhoun (November 13, 1921, in Clarksdale, Mississippi – January 27, 1994, in Paradise Lake, Michigan) was an American jazz double bassist.

Calhoun was raised in Chicago, where he played with Dick Davis (1947–1949) and Ahmad Jamal (1951–52). He worked with Horace Henderson (1952–1954), Johnny Griffin (1954), Roy Eldridge, Billie Holiday, and Miles Davis. He joined Erroll Garner in 1955 and played with him through 1966, recording extensively and touring worldwide. After his time with Garner, Calhoun settled again in Chicago, where he played with vocalist and pianist Norvel Reed (1967–68), then ran a nightclub called Cal's in Chicago from 1972 to 1974 and led a sextet at the Fantasy Club from 1975 to 1980. From 1980 to 1986 he accompanied pianist Lennie Capp, then joined the Chicago All-Stars alongside Erwin Helfer for a tour of Europe. Calhoun never recorded as a leader.

== Discography ==
=== As sideman ===
With Erroll Garner

- Concert by the Sea (Columbia, 1955)
- Paris Impressions (Columbia, 1958)
- Dreamstreet (ABC-Paramount, 1961)
- Close-up in Swing (Philips, 1961)
- Now Playing (MGM, 1965)
- Campus Concert (MGM, 1966)
- Erroll Garner Plays Gershwin and Kern (MPS, 1976)

With others

- Erwin Helfer, On the Sunny Side of the Street (Flying Fish, 1979)
- Willis Jackson, Shuckin' (Prestige, 1963)
- Ahmad Jamal, The Piano Scene of Ahmad Jamal (Epic, 1959)
