= You Are Everything to Me =

- US 7-inch single

Single by Johnny Mathis

from the album More Johnny's Greatest Hits
- A-side: "Small World"
- Released: May 25, 1959
- Recorded: November 10, 1958
- Genre: Pop
- Length: 2:58
- Label: Columbia
- Songwriters: Percy Faith; Carl Sigman
- Producer: Al Ham

Johnny Mathis singles chronology
"Someone" / "Very Much in Love" (1959)	"Small World" / "You Are Everything to Me" (1959)	"Misty" / "The Story of Our Love" (1959)

Music video
- "You Are Everything to Me" on YouTube

"You Are Everything to Me" is a popular song written by Percy Faith and Carl Sigman that was recorded by Johnny Mathis in 1958. It charted in 1959.

== Recording and release ==
Johnny Mathis recorded "You Are Everything to Me" on November 10, 1958, with an orchestra conducted by Ray Ellis. It was produced by Al Ham and released as a single on May 25, 1959, with the A-side "Small World" from the 1959 Broadway musical Gypsy.

== Chart performance ==
"You Are Everything to Me" "bubbled under" Billboard magazine's Hot 100 for 2 weeks in June 1959; it got as high as number 109.

== Critical reception ==
In their review column, the editors of Cash Box magazine featured the single as their Pick of the Week, which was their equivalent to a letter grade of A for both songs. They wrote that the songs were "first-rate" and that "the distinctive Mathis touch gets to the heart of each". The editors of Billboard categorized the single as a "Spotlight Winner", one of the best of the week's new releases, and wrote that both songs were handled "with warmth over pretty ork backing."

== Charts ==
Weekly chart performance for "You Are Everything to Me"
Chart (1959)	Peak position
US Bubbling Under the Hot 100 (Billboard)	109

== Bibliography ==
- Whitburn, Joel (2009), Joel Whitburn's Top Pop Singles, 1955-2008, Record Research Inc., ISBN 0898201802
