= A Night to Remember (Johnny Mathis album) =

Studio album by Johnny Mathis
- Released: April 29, 2008
- Recorded: 2008
- Studio: WallyWorld Studios, Los Angeles, California, Westlake Recording Studios, West Hollywood, California, Studio 7303, Houston, Texas, Shakeji, Inc. Studios, Las Vegas, Nevada
- Genre: Pop/rock; R&B
- Length: 51:17
- Label: Columbia
- Producer: Walter Afanasieff

Johnny Mathis chronology
| Gold: A 50th Anniversary Celebration (2006) | A Night to Remember (2008) | Let It Be Me: Mathis in Nashville (2010) |

Professional ratings
Review scores
| Source | Rating |
|---|---|
| Allmusic | 4/5 stars |

A Night to Remember is an album by American pop singer Johnny Mathis that was released on April 29, 2008, by Columbia Records. In the liner notes for the album, executive producer Jay Landers writes that "Johnny combed through his personal album collection and chose 12 songs sure to evoke faces and places from those golden days when 45s were stacked on the record player and local deejays played songs you could actually hum the melody to."

The album reached number 29 on the UK album chart during its two weeks there in August 2008.

== Reception ==
In rating the album at four stars on AllMusic, John Bush praises producer Walter Afanasieff, who "has helmed most of the best records by many artists who have come later and courted the same audience as Mathis... He definitely saved his best for this date, a landmark in his career." The reviewer also gives high marks to the singer: "Mathis sounds fantastic for a septuagenarian... The material he chooses is excellent as well."

== Track listing ==
From the liner notes for the original album:

1. "Just the Two of Us" (Ralph MacDonald, William Salter, Bill Withers) – 4:07
  - Kenny G – saxophone
2. "You Make Me Feel Brand New" performed with Yolanda Adams (Thom Bell, Linda Creed) – 5:12
  - Nathan East – bass
  - Curt Bisquera – drums
  - Chris Brooke – lead vocal engineer
  - Marq Moody – lead vocal engineer
3. "Walk on By" (Burt Bacharach, Hal David) – 3:03
4. "Hey Girl" (Gerry Goffin, Carole King) – 4:33
5. "The Closer I Get to You" (Reggie Lucas, James Mtume) – 4:43
6. "Where Is the Love" (Ralph MacDonald, William Salter) – 3:22
  - Eric Jackson – guitar
  - Mike Landau – guitar
  - Nathan East – bass
  - Curt Bisquera – drums
7. "All This Love" (El DeBarge) – 5:20
8. "Always" performed with Mone't (David Lewis, Jonathan Lewis, Wayne Lewis) – 4:10
9. "We're in This Love Together" (Roger Murrah, Keith Stegall) – 3:39
  - Dave Koz – saxophone
  - Nathan East – bass
  - Curt Bisquera – drums
  - Joe Wohlmuth – lead vocal engineer
10. "How 'Bout Us" (Dana Walden) – 4:29
11. "Always and Forever" (Rod Temperton) – 4:25
12. "A Night to Remember" performed with Gladys Knight (Walter Afanasieff, Jay Landers) – 4:13
  - Chris Brooke – lead vocal engineer
  - Elliot Peters – lead vocal engineer

== Personnel ==
From the liner notes for the original album:

Performers

- Johnny Mathis – vocals
- Walter Afanasieff – keyboard and rhythm programming
- Tyler Gordon – programming and Pro Tools engineer
- Mike Landau – guitar
- Mabvuto Carpenter – background vocals
- Tiffany Smith – background vocals
- Jason Morales – background vocals
- Mone't – background vocals

Production

- Walter Afanasieff – producer, arranger
- Jay Landers – executive producer
- David Channing – recording engineer
- Brian Warwick – assistant engineer
- Jonnie Davis – mixing engineer
- Ryan Geller – assistant mixing engineer
- Chris Brooke – vocal recording; additional engineering
- David Channing – additional engineering
- Tawgs Salter – additional engineering
- Tyler Gordon – additional engineering
- Doug Sax – mastering
- Sangwook "Sunny" Nam – mastering
- Rich Davis – production coordination
- Edward Blau – Johnny Mathis representation
- Christina Rodriguez – art direction and design
- Jeff Dunas – photography
- Mixed at Public Studios, New York, New York
- Mastered at The Mastering Lab, Ojai, California
