= Erroll Garner Archive =

Archive at the University of Pittsburgh

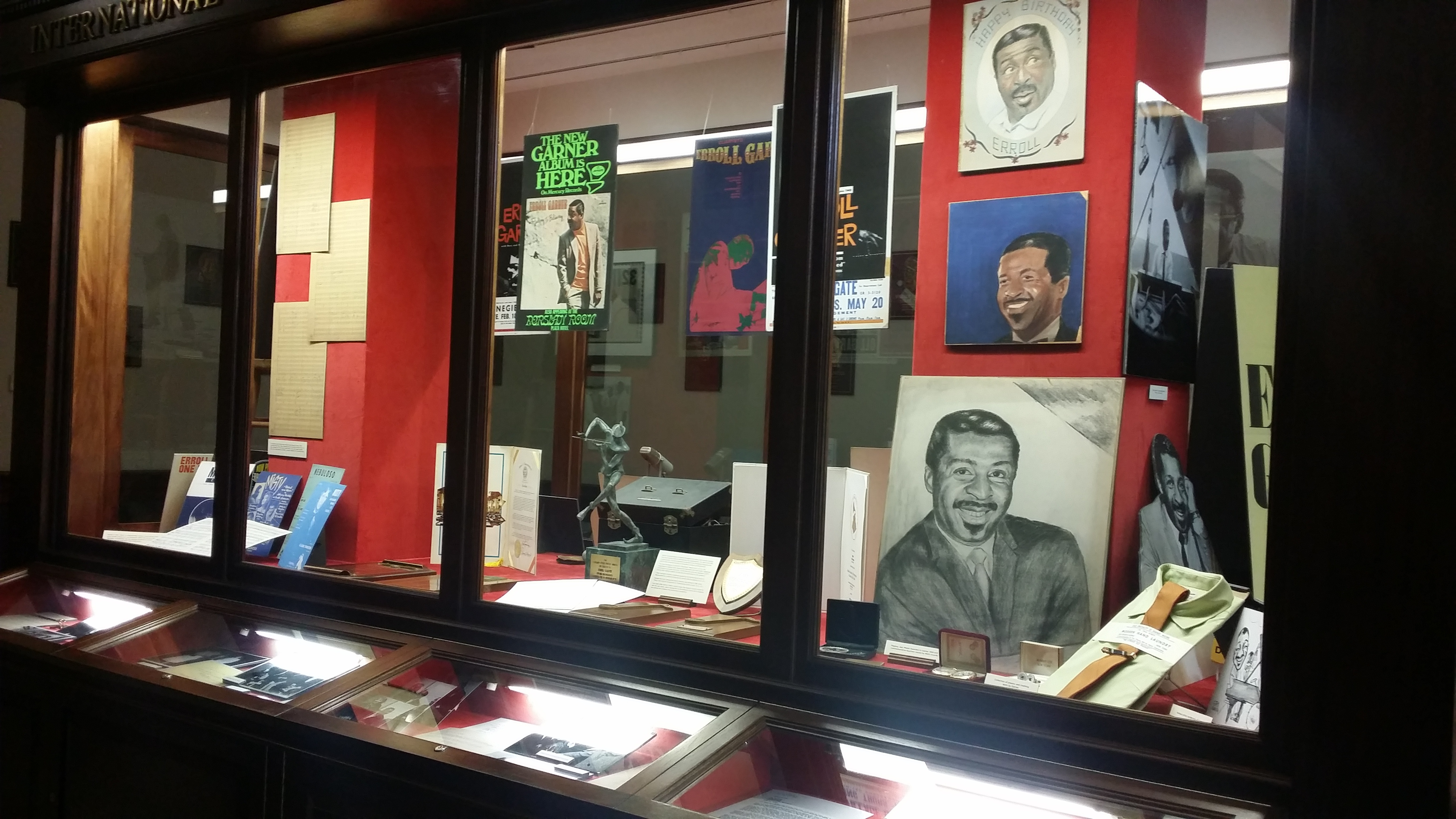
The University of Pittsburgh exhibition containing material from the Erroll Garner Collection housed by the Special Collections section of the University of Pittsburgh Library System

The Erroll Garner Archive is the collection of correspondence, sheet music, recordings of memorabilia of jazz musician Erroll Garner. It is housed with the Archives Service Center, University Library System, University of Pittsburgh of the University of Pittsburgh. The ACS possess manuscripts and record collections that document the music and life of Erroll Garner.

University of Pittsburgh faculty member and fellow jazz pianist Geri Allen received a Grammy nomination based upon her re-creation of Garner's work.
