= Very Much in Love =

- US 7-inch single

Single by Johnny Mathis

from the album More Johnny's Greatest Hits
- A-side: "Someone"
- Released: March 9, 1959
- Recorded: November 10, 1958
- Genre: Pop
- Length: 2:48
- Label: Columbia
- Songwriter(s): Ray Ellis; Al Stillman
- Producer(s): Mitch Miller

Johnny Mathis singles chronology
"Let's Love" / "You Are Beautiful" (1958)	"Someone" / "Very Much in Love" (1959)	"Small World" / "You Are Everything to Me" (1959)

Music video
- "Very Much in Love" on YouTube

"Very Much in Love" is a popular song written by Ray Ellis and Al Stillman that was recorded by Johnny Mathis in 1958. It was released and charted in 1959.

== Recording and release ==
Johnny Mathis recorded "Very Much in Love" on November 10, 1958, with an orchestra conducted by the song's composer, Ray Ellis. It was produced by Mitch Miller and released as a single with the song "Someone" on March 9, 1959.

== Commercial performance ==
"Very Much in Love" reached number 88 on Cash Box magazine's best seller list during a four-week run that began in the issue dated April 11, 1959.

== Critical reception ==
In their review column, the editors of Cash Box magazine featured the single as their Disk of the Week, which was their equivalent to a letter grade of A for both songs. They wrote that Mathis turned in "another outstanding performance" on both songs, adding, "Pretty musical backdrop supplied by the Ray Ellis outfit." They also wrote that "Very Much in Love" "ranks with the artist's best to date". The editors of Billboard categorized the single as a "Spotlight Winner", one of the best of the week's new releases, and combined their comments on the two songs: "Two class readings of two lovely ballads should place the disk high on the best-selling charts. Lush ork support accompanies on both, and the chanter's warm style should create huge appeal for both.".

== Charts ==
Weekly chart performance for "Very Much in Love"
Chart (1959)	Peak position
US Top 60 Best Selling Tunes on Records (Cash Box)	88

== Bibliography ==
- Whitburn, Joel (2014), Joel Whitburn's Cash Box Pop Hits 1952-1996, Record Research Inc., ISBN 978-0-89820-209-0
