= The Story of Our Love =

- US 7-inch single

Single by Johnny Mathis

from the album Portrait of Johnny
- A-side: "Misty"
- Released: September 14, 1959
- Recorded: April 29, 1959
- Genre: Pop
- Length: 2:27
- Label: Columbia
- Songwriters: Michael Colicchio; Anthony Piano
- Producer: Al Ham

Johnny Mathis singles chronology
"Small World" / "You Are Everything to Me" (1959)	"Misty" / "The Story of Our Love" (1959)	"The Best of Everything" (1959)

Music video
- "The Story of Our Love" on YouTube

"The Story of Our Love" is a popular song written by Michael Colicchio and Anthony Piano. It was recorded by Johnny Mathis and charted in 1959.

== Recording and release ==
Johnny Mathis recorded "The Story of Our Love" on April 29, 1959, with an orchestra conducted by Glenn Osser. It was produced by Al Ham and released as a single on September 14, 1959, with the A-side "Misty".

== Chart performance ==
"The Story of Our Love" debuted on the Billboard Hot 100 in the issue of the magazine dated October 12, 1959, and peaked at number 93 the week ending November 23, six weeks later, which was the second of its two non-consecutive weeks on the chart. It also reached number 4 on Cash Box magazine's Looking Ahead chart, which was described as a "compilation, in order of strength, of up and coming records showing signs of breaking into The Cash Box Top 100".

== Critical reception ==
In their review column, the editors of Cash Box magazine featured the single as their Pick of the Week, which was their equivalent to a letter grade of A for both songs. They wrote, "The tender, melodic 'The Story of Our Love' is handled with typical Mathis gentleness." The editors of Billboard categorized the single as a "Spotlight Winner", one of the best of the week's new releases, and described "The Story of Our Love" as "a pretty new ballad that gets a warm vocal from Mathis. The attractive arrangement features lush strings, chorus and harmonica support."

== Charts ==
Weekly chart performance for "The Story of Our Love"
Chart (1959)	Peak position
US Billboard Hot 100	93
US Looking Ahead (Cash Box)	4
