= Jim Bajor =

- Born: 1953; Michigan, United States
- Died: 21 December 2006 (aged 52–53) Michigan, United States
- Genres: New-age, jazz
- Occupation: Pianist
- Instrument: Piano
- Years active: 1987–2006
- Label: Sugo Records

Jim Bajor (1953 – 21 December 2006) was a new-age music pianist with some jazz influences. His self-released debut album Awakening received a Grammy nomination. In 1995 he performed on the 'Somewhere In Time' album, a cover version of Erroll Garner's 1954 Jazz standard Misty (song). He also worked with PBS on a special about the sinking of the SS Edmund Fitzgerald.
