= Open Fire, Two Guitars =

Studio album by Johnny Mathis
- Released: January 5, 1959
- Recorded: October 2–3, 1958
- Studio: CBS 30th Street Studio; New York City
- Genre: Vocal
- Length: 43:05
- Label: Columbia
- Producer: Mitch Miller

Johnny Mathis chronology
Merry Christmas (1958)	Open Fire, Two Guitars (1959)	More Johnny's Greatest Hits (1959)

Open Fire, Two Guitars is an album by American pop singer Johnny Mathis, released on January 5, 1959, by Columbia Records. He opted for guitar and bass accompaniment instead of performing alongside an orchestra. Two new songs ("An Open Fire" and "I'm Just a Boy in Love") are mixed in with covers of popular standards.

The album made its first appearance on Billboard magazine's list of the 25 Best-Selling Pop LPs in the US in the issue dated February 9, 1959, and got as high as number four during its 96 weeks there. It debuted on the Cash Box albums chart in the issue dated January 31, 1959, and remained on the chart for in a total of 44 weeks, spending a week at number three. It received Gold certification from the Recording Industry Association of America for sales of 500,000 copies in the US on December 4, 1962.

The album was released for the first time on compact disc on June 28, 1994, as part of the Master Sound series in which Sony Music used the Super Bit Mapping process to remaster certain titles and burn them onto discs with 24-karat gold plating. It was also issued on a standard compact disc on December 23, 1999. Open Fire, Two Guitars was also included in Legacy's Mathis box set The Voice of Romance: The Columbia Original Album Collection, which was released on December 8, 2017.

== Reception ==
Professional ratings
Review scores
Source	Rating
AllMusic	4.5/5 stars
The Encyclopedia of Popular Music	3/5 stars
Disc	4/5 stars

The album's production values were one thing that especially impressed Greg Adams of AllMusic. "Producer Mitch Miller is often associated with gimmicky or novelty productions, but his work on Open Fire, Two Guitars is perfectly understated, emphasizing the gentle caress of Mathis's voice over the relaxed counterpoint of the two guitars." He added, "The album's effect seems nearly a cappella at times, but 'In the Still of the Night' finds Mathis intoning the lyrics over gently rhythmic guitar figures that educe new harmonic complexities from a well-known song." Writing decades after the album's initial release, Adams noted, "The enduring popularity of Open Fire, Two Guitars is attributable in part to its hypnotic aura of closeness and confidentiality, but also to the simple instrumentation that appeals to many rock-era listeners' preference for guitars over orchestral arrangements."

Upon its debut, Billboard gave it a positive review as well, writing, "It's a fine, warm collection of standards with the artist in best form."

Cash Box claims, "Mathis clings persuasively to such gems as 'My Funny Valentine', 'In the Still of the Night', 'Embraceable You', and 'When I Fall in Love'."

Ken Graham of Disc said the album showed Johnny "sings beautifully, hence the reasonable star rating."

== Track listing ==
=== Side one ===
1. "An Open Fire" (Jerry Leiber, Mike Stoller) – 3:52
2. "Bye Bye Blackbird" (Mort Dixon, Ray Henderson) – 4:07
3. "In the Still of the Night" from Rosalie (Cole Porter) – 2:35
4. "Embraceable You" from Girl Crazy (George Gershwin, Ira Gershwin) – 3:28
5. "I'll Be Seeing You" from Right This Way (Irving Kahal, Sammy Fain) – 4:26
6. "Tenderly" (Jack Lawrence, Walter Gross) – 2:58

=== Side two ===
1. "When I Fall in Love" (Edward Heyman, Victor Young) – 4:31
2. "I Concentrate on You" from Broadway Melody of 1940 (Cole Porter) – 3:16
3. "Please Be Kind" (Sammy Cahn, Saul Chaplin) – 3:24
4. "You'll Never Know" from Hello, Frisco, Hello (Mack Gordon, Harry Warren) – 4:07
5. "I'm Just a Boy in Love" (Shirley Cowell) – 2:44
6. "My Funny Valentine" from Babes in Arms (Richard Rodgers, Lorenz Hart) – 3:37

== Charts ==
Chart (1959)	Peak position
U.S. Billboard Best Selling LPs (Billboard)	4
US Cash Box	3

== Recording dates ==
From the liner notes for The Voice of Romance: The Columbia Original Album Collection:

- October 2, 1958 — "I'm Just a Boy in Love", "In the Still of the Night", "My Funny Valentine"
- October 3, 1958 — "Bye Bye Blackbird", "Embraceable You", "I Concentrate on You", "I'll Be Seeing You", "An Open Fire", "Please Be Kind", "Tenderly", "When I Fall in Love", "You'll Never Know"

== Personnel ==
=== Original album ===
- Johnny Mathis – vocals
- Mitch Miller – producer
- Al Caiola – guitar
- Frank Carroll – bass
- Milt Hinton – bass
- Tony Mottola – guitar
- Dirone – photography

=== 1999 CD reissue ===
From the liner notes for the CD:

- Didier C. Deutsch – producer
- Kevin Boutote – mixing and digital mastering
- Joy Gilbert – project director
- Darren Salmieri – A&R coordinator
- Steve Berkowitz – A&R
- Howard Fritzson – art direction
- Randall Martin – design
- Don Huntstein – photography
- Bob Cato – photography
- Hank Parker – photography
- Michael Cimicata – packaging manager

== Bibliography ==
- Whitburn, Joel (2010), Joel Whitburn Presents Top Pop Albums, Seventh Edition, Record Research Inc., ISBN 0-89820-183-7
- Hoffmann, Frank W (1988), The Cash box album charts, 1955-1974, Scarecrow Press, ISBN 0-810-82005-6
