= Fats Heard =

American jazz musician

- Birth name: Eugene Heard
- Born: October 10, 1923; Cleveland, Ohio, U.S.
- Died: December 5, 1987 (aged 64)
- Genres: Jazz
- Instrument: Drums

Eugene "Fats" Heard (October 10, 1923 – December 5, 1987) was an American jazz drummer.

== Early life and education ==
Born in Cleveland, Ohio, Heard graduated from Central High School and studied piano at the Cleveland Institute of Music before taking up the drums as his primary instrument.

== Career ==
Heard played with Coleman Hawkins and Lionel Hampton and was part of Erroll Garner's band from 1952 to 1955. He played on Garner's original 1954 recording of "Misty". In the late-1950s, Heard ran the Modern Jazz Room (formerly Cotton Club) in downtown Cleveland with his friend Jim Bard.

== Discography ==
With Erroll Garner

- Mambo Moves Garner (Mercury, 1954)
- Contrasts (EmArcy, 1954)
