= Sunset Center =

- Sunset Cultural Center
- U.S. National Register of Historic Places
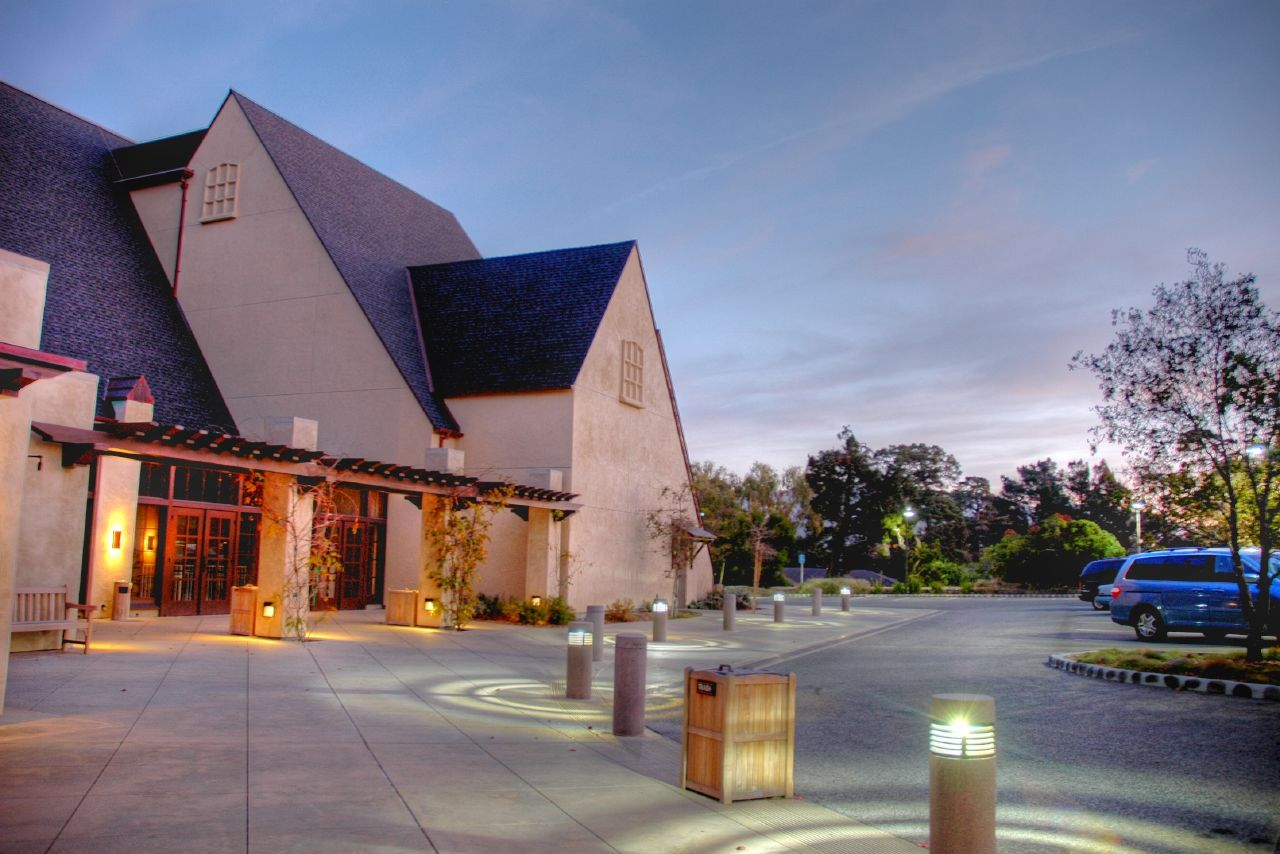
- Sunset Center
- Location: San Carlos St., Carmel-by-the-Sea, California U.S.
- Coordinates: 36.551294°N 121.921184°W
- Built: 1926
- Architect: John J. Donovan
- Architectural style: Gothic Revival
- Website: www.sunsetcenter.org
- NRHP reference No.: 97001604
- Added to NRHP: January 9, 1998

The Sunset Center is located in Carmel-by-the-Sea, California, United States. It is a performing arts center which features concerts, comedy, theatre, and dance.

Formerly the Sunset School, the site was purchased by the city of Carmel in 1965 with the plan to develop it into a cultural center. It is home to the Carmel Bach Festival.

On January 9, 1998, it was listed on the National Register of Historic Places.

== History ==
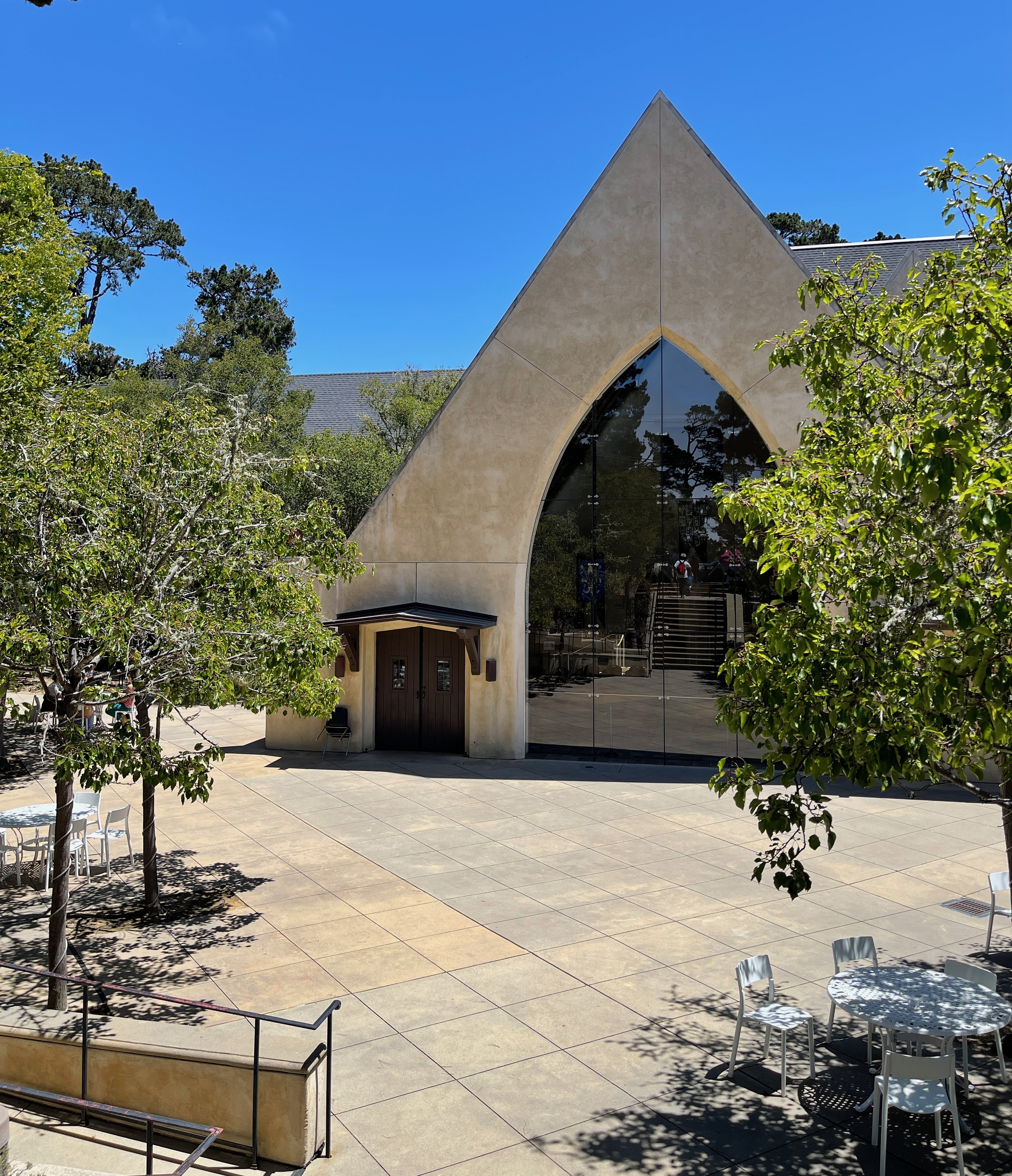
Sunset Center building and outside patio

The Sunset School was a public school founded in 1903, as a subscription school of seven students held in the home of Elmer Douglas on Dolores Street and 7th Avenue in Carmel-by-the-Sea, California. The school moved to another home, then to a lumber company's office, and then, in 1906, the Sunset School was built at 9th Avenue and San Carlos Street.

The school was built in a late Gothic Revival style by architect John J. Donovan. It had only two rooms and a third room was added before 1915. Part of the property is now used for public parking.

Two additional classrooms were designed and built by M. J. Murphy for the school in 1929. the classrooms were on the northwest corner of Mission Street and 10th Avenue. Today, it is used as office space and adult classrooms.

The school district purchased land within the two-block area. In 1931, a 718-seat auditorium was built for the growing school. This auditorium was sometimes utilized by outside organizations and producers, such as the Carmel Bach Festival. It has a steep pitched side-gabled roof designed by architect Columbus J. Ryland and constructed by M. J. Murphy.

In April 1964, faced with the need for expensive earthquake preparedness improvements and limited space to expand, the Sunset School District opted to sell the school to the City of Carmel for $550,000 USD. The city intended to turn the school into a performing arts center and the transaction was completed in 1965 through the passage of a bond measure. The vote count was 1,330 to 169 in favor.

The center was overseen by the Cultural Commission of Carmel City Council. Appointed in 1966, its first director was an alumnus of the school, the photographer Cole Weston. Weston was succeeded by Dorothy Bowman in 1969, who was replaced by Frank Riley in 1970. Riley acknowledged the difficulty of transforming the building: "It was designed as a 1920 schoolhouse, not as a center of the arts. Mechanically, it is almost impossible to administer." The next director of Sunset Center was Richard Tyler, followed by Brian Donoghue in 1990. The 25-year bond was paid off in 1989 and the mortgage ceremoniously burned. The center was listed on the National Register of Historic Places in 1998.

The theatre was renovated from September 2001 to July 2002 using money from a public–private partnership; the City of Carmel paid $9 million USD while private donors contributed $13 million USD.

In 2003, a LARES sound system was installed. Previously, the auditorium had been known to absorb much of its sound, making it difficult for performers to hear. After performing in a one-man show at the theatre, Christopher Plummer famously wrote, "For God's sake, get yourself a real theater." The LARES system, which cost around $300,000 USD, enhanced the volume of the performers, though many of the classical music groups using the venue were dissatisfied with it.

In October 2002, the city of Carmel set up a non-profit organization to run the center. Tom Bacchetti was appointed as its interim director. Current executive director Christine Sandin took that role in 2011.

Currently, the Sunset Center is the home of the Carmel Adult School Pottery Studio, the Center for Photographic Art, the Forest Theater Guild, and the Yoga Center of Carmel. Current producing partners of the center are the Monterey Symphony, the Carmel Music Society, Chamber Music Monterey Bay, and the Carmel Bach Festival.

From 2017 to 2022, the Sunset Center was contracted by the city to manage the nearby Forest Theater venue.

== Notable recordings ==
Recordings of concerts at the Sunset Center have been made commercially available, dating back to when it was still a school. These include:

- Concert by the Sea, 1956, Erroll Garner
- Concert by the Sea, 1959, Cal Tjader Sextet – Includes an early recording of the Mongo Santamaría composition "Afro Blue" featuring the composer
