= Somebody =

Somebody may refer to:

== Music ==
=== Albums ===
- Somebody, by Connie Dover, 1991
- Somebody, by Philip Michael Thomas, 1988

=== Songs ===
- "Somebody" (Aerosmith song), 1973
- "Somebody" (Bonnie McKee song), 2004
- "Somebody" (Bridgit Mendler song), 2011
- "Somebody" (Bryan Adams song), 1985
- "Somebody" (The Chainsmokers song), 2018
- "Somebody" (Depeche Mode song), 1984
- "Somebody" (Internet Money song), 2019
- "Somebody" (Latto song), 2025
- "Somebody" (Mark Wills song), 2001; covered by Reba McEntire, 2004
- "Somebody" (Natalie La Rose song), 2014
- "Somebody" (TSHA, Ellie Goulding and Gregory Porter song), 2023
- "Somebody", by 15&, 2013
- "Somebody", by A Boogie wit da Hoodie from The Bigger Artist, 2017
- "Somebody", by AJ Mitchell, 2018
- "Somebody", by Bazzi from Cosmic, 2018
- "Somebody", by Black Legend, 2001
- "Somebody", by Blue October from History for Sale, 2003
- "Somebody", by Brant Bjork from Mankind Woman, 2018
- "Somebody", by Dagny from Strangers / Lovers, 2020
- "Somebody", by the Eagles from Long Road Out of Eden, 2007
- "Somebody", by JID from The Never Story, 2017
- "Some Body", by Jonna Lee from Remember the Future, 2019
- "Somebody", by Jung Kook from Golden, 2023
- "Somebody", by Justin Bieber from Justice, 2021
- "Somebody", by Memphis May Fire from Remade in Misery, 2022
- "Somebody", by Sam Ryder from There's Nothing but Space, Man!, 2022
- "Somebody", by Sigala from Brighter Days, 2018
- "Somebody", by the Stargazers, 1955
- "Somebody", from Jacobite Relics

== Other uses ==
- Somebody, M.D.C., pen name of American writer John Neal (1793–1876)
- Somebody (podcast), an American true-crime podcast
- Somebody, a 2009 novel by Nancy Springer
- Somebody, a 2014 iOS app created by Miranda July
- Somebody, an indefinite pronoun
- Somebody (TV series), a 2022 South Korean television series
- "Somebody, Somebody", a storyline in the science fiction comedy webtoon series Live with Yourself!
- Somebody (film), a 2025 South Korean film

== See also ==
- Someone (disambiguation)
