= Call Me (Johnny Mathis song) =

- US 7-inch single

Single by Johnny Mathis

from the album More Johnny's Greatest Hits
- B-side: "Stairway to the Sea (Scalinatella)"
- Released: September 8, 1958
- Recorded: May 12, 1958
- Genre: Pop
- Length: 2:47
- Label: Columbia
- Songwriters: Belford Hendricks; Clyde Otis
- Producer: Mitch Miller

Johnny Mathis singles chronology
"A Certain Smile" (1958)	"Call Me" (1958)	"Let's Love" / "You Are Beautiful" (1959)

Music video
- "Call Me" on YouTube

"Call Me" is a popular song written by Belford Hendricks and Clyde Otis that was recorded by Johnny Mathis in 1958. It placed in or near the top 20 on the record charts in the US.

== Recording and release ==
Johnny Mathis recorded "Call Me" and its B-side, "Scalinatella (Stairway to the Sea)", on May 12, 1958, with an orchestra conducted by Ray Ellis. Mitch Miller was the producer. The single was released on September 8, 1958.

== Commercial performance ==
"Call Me" made its debut on the Billboard Hot 100 in the issue of the magazine dated September 29, 1958, and peaked at number 21 six weeks later, the week ending November 10. The song charted there for 15 weeks. It also reached number 14 on Cash Box magazine's best seller list.

== Critical reception ==
In their review column, the editors of Cash Box magazine featured the single as one of their Disks of the Week, which was their equivalent to a letter grade of A for both songs. They described "Call Me" as "a pretty love song chanted in the familiar Mathis manner."

== Charts ==
Weekly chart performance for "Call Me"
Chart (1958)	Peak position
US Billboard Hot 100	21
US Top 100 Best Selling Tunes on Records (Cash Box)	14
