= Let It Be Me: Mathis in Nashville =

Studio album by Johnny Mathis
- Released: September 21, 2010
- Recorded: 2010
- Studio: Blackbird Studios; Zoomar South Studios; Loud Recording Studios; Fireside Studios; Cool Tools Audio; Starstruck Studio; Nashville, Tennessee
- Genre: Country
- Length: 46:48
- Label: Columbia
- Producer: Fred Mollin

Johnny Mathis chronology
A Night to Remember (2008)	Let It Be Me: Mathis in Nashville (2010)	The Ultimate Collection (2011)

Professional ratings
Review scores
Source	Rating
Allmusic	3.5/5 stars

Let It Be Me: Mathis in Nashville is an album by American pop singer Johnny Mathis that was released on September 21, 2010, by Columbia Records and focused upon popular country songs. With the exceptions of the traditional folk song "Shenandoah" and George Strait's "We Must Be Lovin' Right" from 1993, the heyday of the selections that Mathis is covering coincided approximately with the first 20 years of his career, starting with Elvis Presley's "Love Me Tender" from 1956.

The album earned Mathis a Grammy Award nomination for Best Traditional Pop Vocal Album.

== Reception ==
"Location matters little to Johnny Mathis," writes Stephen Thomas Erlewine of Allmusic -- "wherever he goes, there he is, sounding as smooth as ever. That’s quite an accomplishment for a singer of 74, to still make it all seem effortless." He also notes that, with a few exceptions, the album "sounds as if it could have easily been released in the early ‘60s when Mathis was a regular fixture in the charts..., and that's its strength." He concludes that "Mathis sounds as silky as his surroundings," and asserts that "that may be because he wound up having Nashville accept his terms instead of bending to the rules of the Music City."

Oprah Winfrey included the album in her Oprah's Favorite Things promotion in 2010, the last before The Oprah Winfrey Show ended its run in 2011.

== Track listing ==
1. "What a Wonderful World" performed with Lane Brody (Bob Thiele, George David Weiss) - 4:04
2. "Let It Be Me" performed with Alison Krauss (Gilbert Bécaud, Mann Curtis) - 3:29
3. "Make the World Go Away" (Hank Cochran) - 3:17
4. "Crazy" (Willie Nelson) - 3:27
5. "Southern Nights" (Allen Toussaint) - 3:33
6. "You Don't Know Me" (Cindy Walker, Eddy Arnold) - 3:30
7. "Lovin' Arms" featuring harmony vocals by Vince Gill (Tom Jans) - 3:06
8. "Shenandoah" (traditional) - 4:35
9. "We Must Be Lovin' Right" (Clay Blaker, Roger Brown) - 3:32
10. "I Can't Stop Loving You" (Don Gibson) - 3:12
11. "Love Me Tender" (adaptation of Civil War song "Aura Lee" by Ken Darby, who published it under the pseudonym "Vera Matson", the name of his wife) - 3:37
12. "Please Help Me, I'm Falling" (Hal Blair, Don Robertson) - 2:55
13. "What a Wonderful World" (Christmas Version) performed with Lane Brody (Bob Thiele, George David Weiss) - 4:31

== Personnel ==
- Johnny Mathis – vocals
- Lane Brody - vocals ("What a Wonderful World", "What a Wonderful World" (Christmas version))
- Alison Krauss - vocals ("Let It Be Me")
- Vince Gill - harmony vocals ("Lovin' Arms")
- Fred Mollin – producer; acoustic guitars, electric sitar, percussion
- Jay Landers - executive producer; liner notes
- Kyle Lehning - mixer, basic track engineer
- Matthew McCauley – strings arranger and conductor
- "Teenage" Dave Salley - overdub engineer
- Ed Seay - engineer (Alison Krauss vocal)
- Steve Buckingham - engineer (Alison Krauss vocal)
- Drew Bollman - engineer (Vince Gill vocal)
- Greg Calbi – mastering
- Ed Blau – representation
- Heads of State - front and back cover photo-illustrations
- Carrie Reigers – front cover photograph
- Becky Fluke – back cover photograph
- Dave Bett - art direction
- John Jarvis – piano, Wurlitzer, organ
- Gary Prim – organ, synth, Wurlitzer
- Bryan Sutton - acoustic guitar
- Brent Mason - electric guitar
- John Willis - acoustic guitar
- Larry Paxton – bass
- Eddie Bayers – drums
- Stuart Duncan – fiddle
- Jeff Taylor - accordion
- Paul Franklin - pedal steel guitar, dobro
- Jerry Douglas - dobro ("What a Wonderful World", "Southern Nights", "Lovin' Arms", "Shenandoah", "What a Wonderful World (Christmas Version)")
- Dan Dugmore – pedal steel guitar ("We Must Be Lovin' Right", "Crazy", "Make the World Go Away")
- Jim Hoke – harmonica
- Russell Terrell - background vocals
- Lane Brody - background vocals
- Tania Hancheroff - background vocals
- Jaime Babbitt - background vocals
- Troy Johnson - background vocals
- The Johnsonaires - background vocals
- Mixed at The Compound, Nashville, TN, and Village Recorders, Los Angeles, CA
- Mastered at Sterling Sound, New York, NY
