= More Johnny's Greatest Hits =

Compilation album by Johnny Mathis
- Released: June 22, 1959
- Recorded: 1957–1959
- Genre: Vocal; pop/rock; stage & screen
- Length: 34:22
- Label: Columbia
- Producer: Mitch Miller; Al Ham

Johnny Mathis chronology
Open Fire, Two Guitars (1959)	More Johnny's Greatest Hits (1959)	Heavenly (1959)

Professional ratings
Review scores
Source	Rating
Allmusic	link
The Encyclopedia of Popular Music	4/5 stars

More Johnny's Greatest Hits is a compilation album by Johnny Mathis that was released by Columbia Records on June 22, 1959, and contains the A- and B-sides of five of his singles as well as "Teacher, Teacher", the chart hit that was the B-side of the Johnny's Greatest Hits track "All the Time", and "The Flame of Love," which had not been released before.

The album made its first appearance on Billboard magazine's Best Selling LP's chart the following month, in the issue dated July 27, and remained there for 93 weeks, two of which were spent at number two. It received Gold certification from the Recording Industry Association of America on January 12, 1962.

== Reception ==
William Ruhlmann of Allmusic explained that the downside of this follow-up to the successful Johnny's Greatest Hits compilation was that "Columbia waited only 15 months between the two albums -- long enough for Mathis to release five singles that all managed modest chart success, though none matched the hit status of songs from the first album." He gave the album a mixed review: "There are some excellent examples of the singer's characteristic ballad style, but he also struggles with inferior uptempo material, and the album is uneven, especially in comparison to its predecessor. Nevertheless, it went gold and spent more than a year and a half in the charts, ample evidence of Mathis's continuing appeal."

== Track listing ==
=== Side one ===
1. "Small World" from Gypsy: A Musical Fable (Jule Styne, Stephen Sondheim) - 3:21
  - rec. 4/29/59, rel. 5/25/59; Billboard Hot 100: 20
2. "Someone" (William J. Tennyson Jr.) - 2:58
  - rec. 9/26/58, rel. 3/9/59; Billboard Hot 100: 35
3. "Very Much in Love" (Ray Ellis, Al Stillman) - 2:48
  - rec. 11/10/58, rel. 3/9/59; B-side of "Someone"
4. "You Are Everything to Me" (Percy Faith, Carl Sigman) - 2:58
  - rec. 11/10/58, rel. 5/25/59; Bubbling Under the Hot 100 chart: 109; B-side of "Small World"
5. "Let It Rain" (Al Frisch, Sid Wayne) - 2:40
  - rec. 1/7/58, rel. 6/2/58; B-side of "A Certain Smile"
6. "The Flame of Love" (Lee Pockriss, Jerry Vance) - 2:50
  - rec. 4/29/59, rel. 6/22/59; previously unreleased

=== Side two ===
1. "A Certain Smile" from A Certain Smile (Sammy Fain, Paul Francis Webster) - 2:48
  - rec. 5/12/58, rel. 6/2/58; Billboard Most Played by Jockeys: 14
2. "Call Me" (Belford Hendricks, Clyde Otis) - 2:48
  - rec. 5/12/58, rel. 9/8/58; Billboard Hot 100: 21
3. "You Are Beautiful" from Flower Drum Song (Richard Rodgers, Oscar Hammerstein II) - 3:10
  - rec. 11/10/58, rel. 12/1/58; Billboard Hot 100: 60; B-side of "Let's Love"
4. "Teacher, Teacher" (Robert Allen, Al Stillman) - 2:41
  - rec. 10/31/57, rel. 3/17/58; Billboard Most Played by Jockeys: 21; B-side of "All the Time"
5. "Stairway to the Sea (Scalinatella)" (Albert Beach, Giuseppe Cioffi) - 2:36
  - rec. 5/12/58, rel. 9/8/58; B-side of "Call Me"
6. "Let's Love" (Richard Ferraris, Norman Kaye) - 2:44
  - rec. 9/26/58, rel. 12/1/58; Billboard Hot 100: 44

On the UK version of More Johnny's Greatest Hits, "Teacher, Teacher" was replaced with "The Best of Everything", which made its U.S. compilation debut five years later on I'll Search My Heart and Other Great Hits.

== Personnel ==
- Mitch Miller – producer (except "The Flame of Love", "Small World", "You Are Everything to Me")
- Al Ham – producer^{[A]} ("A Certain Smile"; "Teacher, Teacher"; "Let's Love", "Someone", "The Flame of Love", "Small World", "You Are Everything to Me")
- Ray Ellis – conductor (except as noted)
- Glenn Osser – conductor ("Small World", "The Flame of Love")

== Notes ==
- ^{A} While the 2015 compilation The Singles only credits Ham as producer for five of the tracks on this collection, the other compilations listed in the Notes section credit him as such on the tracks indicated. Neither the original singles nor the compilations released before these provided this information.

== Bibliography ==
- Whitburn, Joel (2009), Joel Whitburn's Top Pop Singles, 1955-2008, Record Research Inc., ISBN 0898201802
- Whitburn, Joel (2010), Joel Whitburn Presents Top Pop Albums, Seventh Edition, Record Research Inc., ISBN 0-89820-183-7
