= You Are Beautiful (song) =

- US 7-inch single

Single by Johnny Mathis

from the album More Johnny's Greatest Hits
- A-side: "Let's Love"
- Released: December 1, 1958
- Recorded: November 10, 1958
- Genre: Pop
- Length: 3:10
- Label: Columbia
- Songwriters: Richard Rodgers; Oscar Hammerstein II
- Producer: Mitch Miller

Johnny Mathis singles chronology
"Call Me" (1958)	"Let's Love" / "You Are Beautiful" (1958)	"Someone" / "Very Much in Love" (1959)

Music video
- "You Are Beautiful" on YouTube

"You Are Beautiful" is a popular song written by Richard Rodgers and Oscar Hammerstein II for the 1958 Broadway musical Flower Drum Song. A recording of the song by Johnny Mathis charted in 1959.

== In Flower Drum Song ==
"You Are Beautiful" is presented in different contexts in the original 1958 production of the musical, the 1961 film of the same name and the 2002 Broadway revival. In the original production, the song was performed by Ed Kenney and Juanita Hall during a scene in which the character of Wang Ta tells his aunt, Madam Liang, that he has memorized a famous poem with that title to impress Linda Low, a blind date. Hall sings introductory lyrics that were not included in the Mathis recording. The blind date, Linda Low, is involved with Sammy Fong, the owner of a nightclub where she is a performer. Sammy, however, is in an arrangement to marry Mei Li, a much quieter woman who Ta falls in love with. In the film version, "You Are Beautiful" is performed later in the story, when Ta expresses his love for Mei Li. The 2002 revival also presents the song this way.

In a 2013 essay, musicologist Todd Decker used "You Are Beautiful" as an example of how poorly the music in Flower Drum Song represents Chinese culture. He wrote,

Flower Drum Song sounds, especially in its melodies, for the most part like a typical Rodgers and Hammerstein score. Preserving the potential for most of the songs to be sung out of context, Hammerstein seldom referred to the Chinese identity of the characters in his lyrics.

After describing how the 2002 revival by David Henry Hwang with orchestration by Don Sebesky added instrumentation from the Peking opera tradition, he concluded,

Still, these often delicate sounds do little to alter the forceful showbiz quality of the whole. When traditional Chinese opera is demonstrated with the tuneful "You Are Beautiful", Chinese flute and gongs are given prominence, but the tune is firmly in the Broadway tradition and the vocal style of the performers draws on the emotive power ballads of Broadway megamusicals and animated Disney films. Under these terms, the music cannot contribute to the storytelling or delineation of character.

== Recording and release ==
Johnny Mathis recorded "You Are Beautiful" on November 10, 1958, with an orchestra conducted by Ray Ellis. It was produced by Mitch Miller and released as a single on December 1 of that year with the A-side "Let's Love".

== Commercial performance ==
"You Are Beautiful" debuted on the Billboard Hot 100 in the issue of the magazine dated January 5, 1959, and peaked at number 60 the week ending January 19, 1959. It remained on the chart for six weeks. It also reached number 60 on Cash Box magazine's best seller list.

== Critical reception ==
In their review column, the editors of Cash Box magazine featured the single as their Disk of the Week, which was their equivalent to a letter grade of A for both songs. They described Mathis's recording of "You Are Beautiful" as "tender". The editors of Billboard categorized the single as a "Spotlight Winner", one of the best of the week's new releases, and described "You Are Beautiful" as "a lovely ballad".

== Charts ==
Weekly chart performance for "You Are Beautiful"
Chart (1959)	Peak position
US Billboard Hot 100	60
US Top 100 Best Selling Tunes on Records (Cash Box)	60

== Bibliography ==
- Block, Geoffrey Holden (2023), A Fine Romance: Adapting Broadway to Hollywood in the Studio System Era, Oxford University Press, ISBN 978-0-1975-0173-3
- Decker, Todd (2013), "Chapter 14: Race, Ethnicity, Performance", in Morris, Mitchell; Knapp, Raymond; Wolf, Stacy (eds.), The Oxford Handbook of The American Musical, OUP USA, ISBN 9780199987368
- Lee, Esther Kim (2015), The Theatre of David Henry Hwang, Bloomsbury Publishing, ISBN 978-1-4725-1208-6
- Whitburn, Joel (2014), Joel Whitburn's Cash Box Pop Hits 1952-1996, Record Research Inc., ISBN 978-0-89820-209-0
