= Martha Farkas Glaser =

American civil rights activist and music historian

- Born: Martha Farkas; February 15, 1921; Duquesne, Pennsylvania, U.S.
- Died: December 3, 2014 (aged 93)
- Other names: Martha Glaser; Martha Gleicher; Martha Glaser Gleicher
- Citizenship: American
- Education: Wayne State University
- Occupations: Civil Rights activist; Manager; Publicist; Author

Martha Farkas Glaser (February 15, 1921 – December 3, 2014) was the manager, producer, and business partner of jazz musician Erroll Garner. She was also a civil rights activist. Though she was best known for her role as Garner's manager, she was also a prolific writer of lyrics and poetry.

== Early life and education ==
Martha Farkas was born in Duquesne, Pennsylvania to Samuel and Pearl Farkas, Hungarian Jewish immigrants who emigrated to the Pittsburgh area. She had a sister, Bella (later Mrs. Bella Rosenberg). Farkas graduated from Southwestern High School in Detroit and then earned her bachelor's degree in government with minors in Economics, Sociology and History from Wayne State University in Detroit in 1942.

== Career ==
After college, Glaser worked for the Metropolitan Detroit Youth Council and as a compliance officer for the War Manpower Commission. She also held a position in the publicity department of the Greater Detroit and in the Wayne County Union council. During this time she promoted and was involved with local leaders in the community to maintain food subsidies. She was active in organizing the efforts of local trade union and non-unionized workers. She continued her education during this time by studying radio script writing. It was during this time that she decided to take a career in journalism and public affairs, but after the Detroit race riot of 1943 she was a major participant in addressing race relations by helping to form the Entertainment Industry Emergency Committee to halt "race hatred."

After these positions, she worked for the City of Chicago Mayor's Commission on Human Relations from about 1944 to 1946. She handled publicity, press relations, fact-finding and specialized in press releases addressing issues related to race relations. She arranged events for the commission. She was a featured speaker on radio shows and public functions on activities of the commission. After leaving this job, she accepted a job with the Disc Company of New York City. In 1946, Glaser worked for the City of Chicago Mayor's Commission on Human Relations.

In the early 1950s, Glaser met jazz pianist Erroll Garner composer of the standard "Misty." Though recorded by a wide variety of performers, Garner's version of "Misty" was inducted into the Grammy Hall of Fame in 1991.

== Archives ==
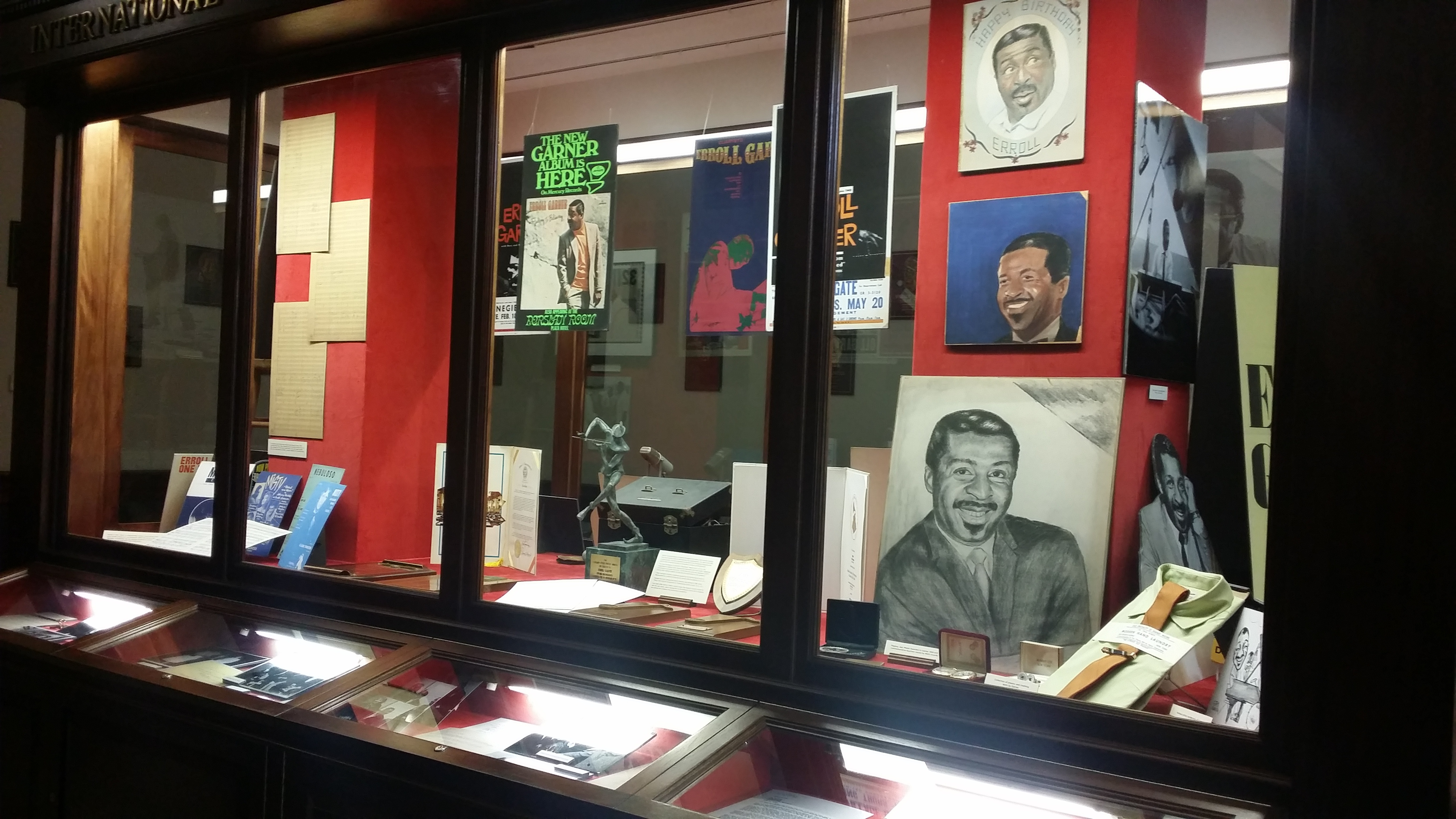
The University of Pittsburgh exhibition containing material donated by the Martha Glaser estate that is now housed as the Erroll Archives in the Special Collections section of the University of Pittsburgh Library System

Glaser maintained the collection of Erroll Garner original recordings and records during her lifetime. The collection was given to the University of Pittsburgh by her estate. Examples of records contained in the archives include Glaser's:

- Correspondence
  - Letters of reference
  - Condolence letters
  - Between Garner's family and Glaser
- Legal papers
- Banking records
- Documentation of royalties
- Trust Agreement and Will

Recordings from the archives and preserved by Glaser have been released and included songs that have been published for the first time in September 2016. In the recent release of archived recordings, Glaser can be heard during the studio recordings give instructions to Garner from the control booth.

During her lifetime, Glaser maintained the largest collections of Garner's work.

== Personal life ==
She went by various names. In 1947, she called herself Martha Gleicher. By 1949, she took the name of Martha Glaser Gleicher.

== Bibliography ==
- Doran, James (1985). Erroll Garner, the most happy piano. Metuchen, N.J: Scarecrow Press and the Institute of Jazz Studies, Rutgers University. ISBN 0810817454.
