= Ernest McCarty =

American musician (1941–2025)

- Born: Ernest McCarty Jr. March 26, 1941; Chicago, Illinois, U.S.
- Died: December 11, 2025 (aged 84)
- Genres: Jazz; classical music
- Occupations: Musician; composer; playwright
- Instrument: Upright bass
- Website: Official website

Ernest McCarty Jr. (March 26, 1941 – December 11, 2025) was an American upright bass player, musical composer and playwright. He is known for playing with Erroll Garner from 1970 until Garner's death in 1977, as well as for plays he has written, scored and directed.

== Life and career ==
McCarty was born in South Chicago to Samarie Hunter McCarty and Ernest McCarty Sr. His mother had some Native American ancestry and his father was part Scottish and insisted he use "Junior" after his name. He lived in New York for a long time, and moved to Pittsburgh in 1993. He played his bass on his front porch during the COVID era.

He learned piano as a child, then took violin lessons but stopped because his parents couldn't afford the lessons. He attended DuSable High School, where the music instructor Captain Walter Dyett chose him to play bass and so he learned the instrument. He was in the Chicago Youth Orchestra and the Civic Orchestra. He was scheduled to audition for the Chicago Symphony Orchestra but wasn't allowed to audition because he was Black.

McCarty switched to Jazz after that experience. He attended Roosevelt University where he took his first formal lessons in string bass. He joined Oscar Brown Jr.'s band in 1962 and played string bass and acted as the musical director. He has performed with Odetta, Ike and Tina Turner, and Gloria Gaynor.

He directed and co-wrote the musical Dinah! Queen of the Blues with Sasha Dalton, about the life of Dinah Washington. He has written or co-written more than 25 plays and musicals and acted as artistic director for New Horizons Theater in Pittsburgh from 1994 through 2008.

McCarty was married to Patricia Kearney McCarty. He died on December 11, 2025, at the age of 84.

== Awards and honors ==
- 1977 Madame Hortense - Joseph Jefferson Award
- 1987 Recollection Rag - Hoyt W. Fuller One-Act Play Festival Award - awarded by the African American Arts Alliance of Chicago
- 1998 Prolific Playwright of 1998 - In Pittsburgh
- 2004 African American Council of the Arts Onyx Award - Best Production Blue
- 2006 African American Council of the Arts Onyx Award - Best Director Purlie Victorious
- 2007 African American Council of the Arts Onyx Award - Best Production American Menu
