= The Best of Everything (song) =

- US 7-inch single

Single by Johnny Mathis

from the album I'll Search My Heart and Other Great Hits
- B-side: "Cherie"
- Released: September 28, 1959
- Recorded: September 8, 1959
- Genre: Pop
- Length: 2:46
- Label: Columbia
- Songwriters: Alfred Newman; Sammy Cahn
- Producer: Al Ham

Johnny Mathis singles chronology
"Misty" / "The Story of Our Love" (1959)	"The Best of Everything" (1959)	"Starbright" / "All Is Well" (1960)

Music video
- "The Best of Everything" on YouTube "The Best of Everything" (live, The Ed Sullivan Show, 1959) on YouTube

"The Best of Everything" is a popular song written by Alfred Newman and Sammy Cahn for the 1959 film of the same name. It was recorded by Johnny Mathis and charted in the US and the UK that same year. The songwriters were nominated for the Academy Award for Best Original Song in 1960.

== Recording and release ==
Johnny Mathis recorded "The Best of Everything" on September 8, 1959, with an orchestra conducted by Glenn Osser. It was produced by Al Ham and released as a single three weeks later, on September 28, ten days before the film's New York premiere.

== Chart performance ==
"The Best of Everything" debuted on the Billboard Hot 100 in the issue of the magazine dated November 16, 1959. The song charted there for five weeks. Mathis's previous single, which contained the songs "Misty" and "The Story of Our Love", had been released two weeks before "The Best of Everything", on September 14. All three songs peaked within a week of each other, with "The Story of Our Love" reaching number 93 the week ending November 23, 1959, and "Misty" and "The Best of Everything" topping out at numbers 12 and 62, respectively, the week ending November 30. "The Best of Everything" reached number 67 on Cash Box magazine's best seller list. On the UK Singles Chart it peaked at number 30.

== Critical reception ==
In their review column, the editors of Cash Box magazine featured the single as their Pick of the Week, which was their equivalent to a letter grade of A for both "The Best of Everything" and its B-side, "Cherie". They described "The Best of Everything" as "beautiful" and wrote, "Superb Glenn Osser ork and choral backdrop." The editors of Billboard categorized the single as a "Spotlight Winner", one of the best of the week's new releases, and described "The Best of Everything" as "a lovely ballad".

== Academy Award nomination ==
"The Best of Everything" was nominated for Best Song at the 32nd Academy Awards in 1960, where it was performed by English singer Frankie Vaughan. The winner was "High Hopes" from A Hole in the Head.

== Live performance ==
Mathis performed "The Best of Everything" on The Ed Sullivan Show on November 8, 1959.

== Legacy ==
In the liner notes for his 1993 box set The Music of Johnny Mathis: A Personal Collection regarding "The Best of Everything", Mathis wrote, "This is one of my favorite songs. It has such brilliance. I sang it over the opening credits, and then the action of the movie took over. It was one of the thrills of my life."

== Charts ==
Weekly chart performance for "The Best of Everything"
Chart (1959)	Peak position
US Billboard Hot 100	62
US Top 100 Best Selling Tunes on Records (Cash Box)	67
UK Singles Chart	30

== Bibliography ==
- Whitburn, Joel (2014), Joel Whitburn's Cash Box Pop Hits 1952-1996, Record Research Inc., ISBN 978-0-89820-209-0
- Wiley, Mason; Bona, Damien (1996), Inside Oscar: The Unofficial History of the Academy Awards, Ballantine Books, ISBN 0-345-40053-4
