= Someone (Johnny Mathis song) =

- US 7-inch single

Single by Johnny Mathis

from the album More Johnny's Greatest Hits
- B-side: "Very Much in Love"
- Released: March 9, 1959
- Recorded: September 26, 1958
- Genre: Pop
- Length: 2:58
- Label: Columbia
- Songwriter: William J. Tennyson Jr.
- Producers: Al Ham; Mitch Miller

Johnny Mathis singles chronology
"Let's Love" / "You Are Beautiful" (1958)	"Someone" / "Very Much in Love" (1959)	"Small World" / "You Are Everything to Me" (1959)

Music video
- "Someone" on YouTube

"Someone" is a popular song written by William J. Tennyson Jr. that was recorded by Johnny Mathis in 1958. It reached the top 40 in the US and the top 10 in the UK.

== Recording and release ==
Johnny Mathis recorded "Someone" on September 26, 1958, with an orchestra conducted by Ray Ellis. It was produced by Al Ham and Mitch Miller and released as a single on March 9, 1959.

== Commercial performance ==
"Someone" debuted on the Billboard Hot 100 in the issue of the magazine dated March 23, 1959, and peaked at number 35 nine weeks later, the week ending May 25. The song charted there for 13 weeks. It also reached number 33 on Cash Box magazine's best seller list. In the UK it peaked at number 6.

== Critical reception ==
In their review column, the editors of Cash Box magazine featured the single as their Disk of the Week, which was their equivalent to a letter grade of A for both songs. They wrote that Mathis turned in "another outstanding performance" on both songs, adding, "Pretty musical backdrop supplied by the Ray Ellis outfit." They described "Someone" as "warm and lovely". The editors of Billboard categorized the single as a "Spotlight Winner", one of the best of the week's new releases, and combined their comments on the two songs: "Two class readings of two lovely ballads should place the disk high on the best-selling charts. Lush ork support accompanies on both, and the chanter's warm style should create huge appeal for both.".

== Aftermath ==
The songwriter, Bill Tennyson, died in a car accident on April 8, 1959, on his way home from performing in Harlem.

== Charts ==
Weekly chart performance for "Someone"
Chart (1959)	Peak position
US Billboard Hot 100	35
US Top 60 Best Selling Tunes on Records (Cash Box)	33
UK Singles Chart	6
