= Erroll Garner =

American jazz pianist and composer (1921–1977)

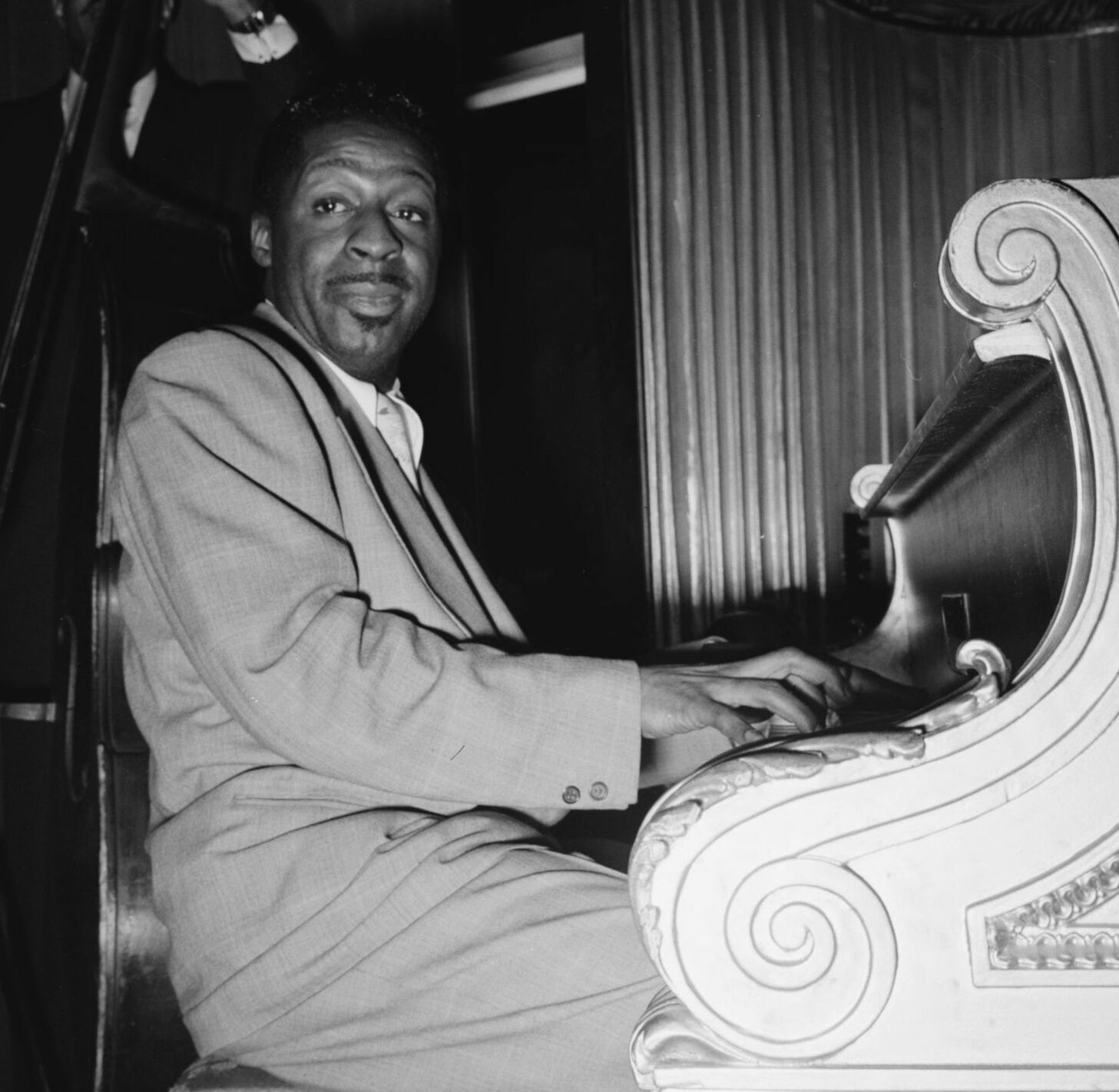
- Garner, c. 1947

Background information
- Born: Erroll Louis Garner; June 15, 1921; Pittsburgh, Pennsylvania, U.S.
- Died: January 2, 1977 (aged 55) Los Angeles, California, U.S.
- Genre: Jazz
- Occupations: Musician; composer
- Instrument: Piano
- Years active: 1944–1974
- Labels: Mercury; Columbia; Verve; Blue Note; London; Savoy; Mack Avenue; EmArcy

Erroll Louis Garner (June 15, 1921 – January 2, 1977) was an American jazz pianist and composer known for his swing playing and ballads. His instrumental ballad "Misty", his best-known composition, has become a jazz standard. It was first recorded in 1956, with Mitch Miller and his orchestra, and played a prominent part in the 1971 motion picture Play Misty for Me.

Scott Yanow of AllMusic calls him "one of the most distinctive of all pianists" and a "brilliant virtuoso". Garner received a star on the Hollywood Walk of Fame at 6363 Hollywood Boulevard. His live album Concert by the Sea, first released in 1955, sold more than 1 million copies by 1958, and Yanow's opinion of the album is that it "made such a strong impression that Garner was considered immortal from then on."

== Life and career ==
Garner was born, along with twin brother Ernest in Pittsburgh, Pennsylvania, on June 15, 1921, the youngest of six children. He attended George Westinghouse High School (as did fellow pianists Billy Strayhorn and Ahmad Jamal). Interviews with his family, music teachers, other musicians, and a detailed family tree can be found in Erroll Garner: The Most Happy Piano by James M. Doran.

=== Piano career ===
Garner began playing piano at the age of three. His elder siblings were taught piano by a "Miss Bowman". From an early age, Erroll would sit down and play anything she had demonstrated, "just like Miss Bowman", his eldest sister Martha said. Garner was self-taught and remained an "ear player" all his life, never learning to read music. At the age of seven, he began appearing on the radio station KDKA in Pittsburgh with a group named the Candy Kids. By the age of 11, he was playing on the Allegheny riverboats. In 1937, he joined local saxophonist Leroy Brown.

Garner played locally in the shadow of his older brother Linton, also a pianist.

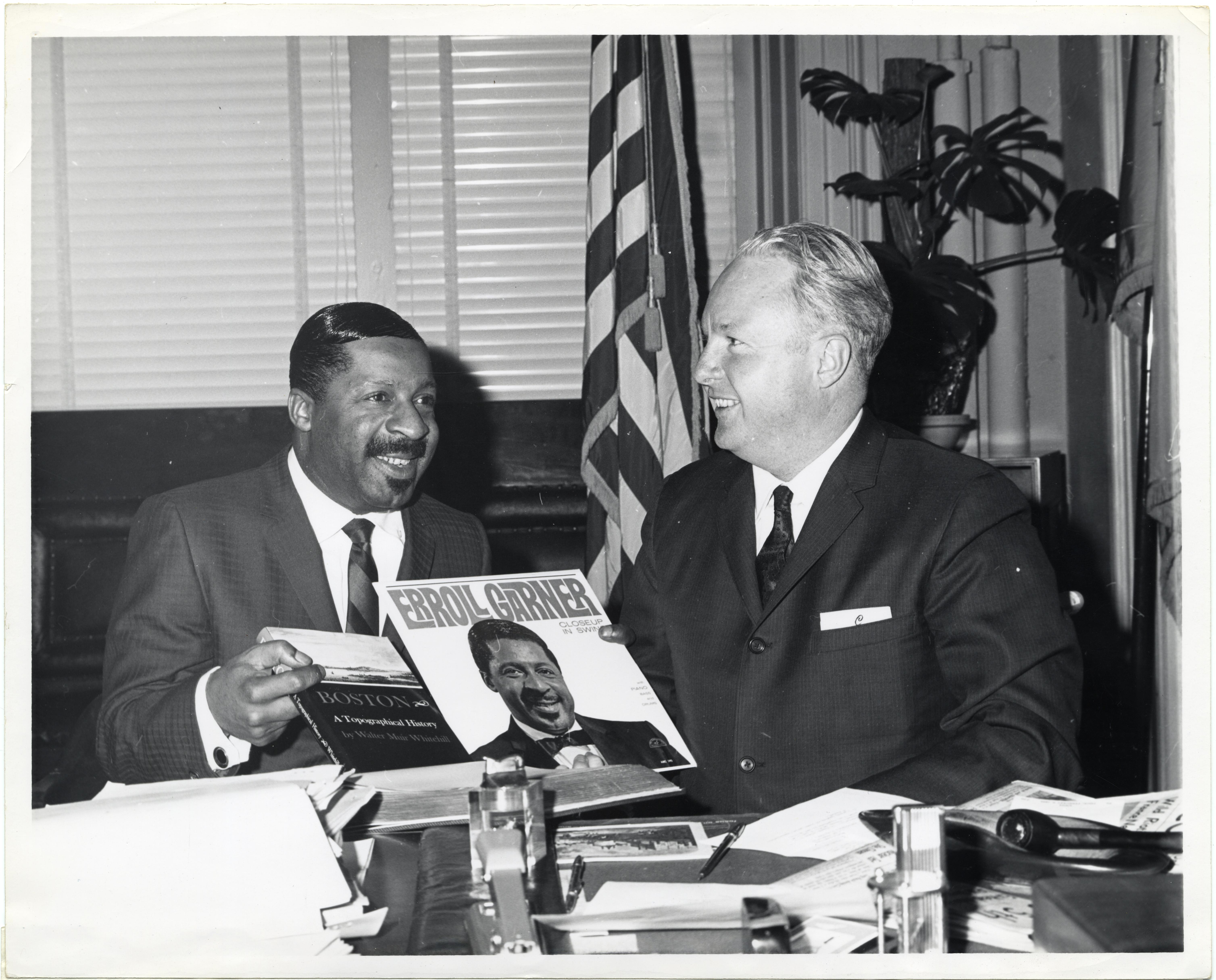
Garner in visit with the Boston mayor John F. Collins, 1962

Garner moved to New York City in 1944. He briefly worked with the bassist Slam Stewart, and although not a bebop musician per se, in 1947 played with Charlie Parker on the "Cool Blues" session. Although Garner's admission to the Pittsburgh music union initially was refused because of his inability to read music, the union relented in 1956 and made him an honorary member. He is credited with having had a superb musical memory. After attending a concert by Russian classical pianist Emil Gilels, Garner returned to his apartment and was able to play a large portion of the performed music by heart.

=== Columbia Records Lawsuit ===
Garner sued Columbia Records in 1960 for breach of contract after they released several recordings without his consent. He had signed a five-year deal with Columbia in 1956, which contained an unprecedented clause (negotiated with the aid of manager Martha Glaser) giving Garner the right to approve the release of any of his recorded music. After three years of litigation, during which time Columbia continued to release Garner recordings against his will, the New York State Supreme Court ruled in Garner's favor in a landmark decision with regard to artists' rights, and Columbia paid Garner a substantial settlement and recalled all of the unauthorized records from its distributors.

== Personal life ==
Garner did not marry, but fathered a daughter, Kim Garner, who is interviewed in the 2012 film No One Can Hear You Read.

=== Death ===
Garner died of cardiac arrest related to emphysema on January 2, 1977, aged 55. He is buried in Pittsburgh's Homewood Cemetery.

=== Management, estate and heirs ===
Garner's career was supervised by music manager Martha Glaser from 1950 until his death in 1977; he was her only client.

Neither Garner's partner Rosalyn Noisette nor his daughter Kim Garner were able to be his heirs. Glaser became his estate executor. After Glaser's death, her niece Susan Rosenberg inherited the charge to deal with Garner's cultural legacy.

== Playing style ==
Short in stature (5 feet 2 inches [157 cm]), Garner performed sitting on multiple telephone directories. He was also known for his vocalizations while playing, which can be heard on many of his recordings. He helped to bridge the gap for jazz musicians between nightclubs and the concert hall.

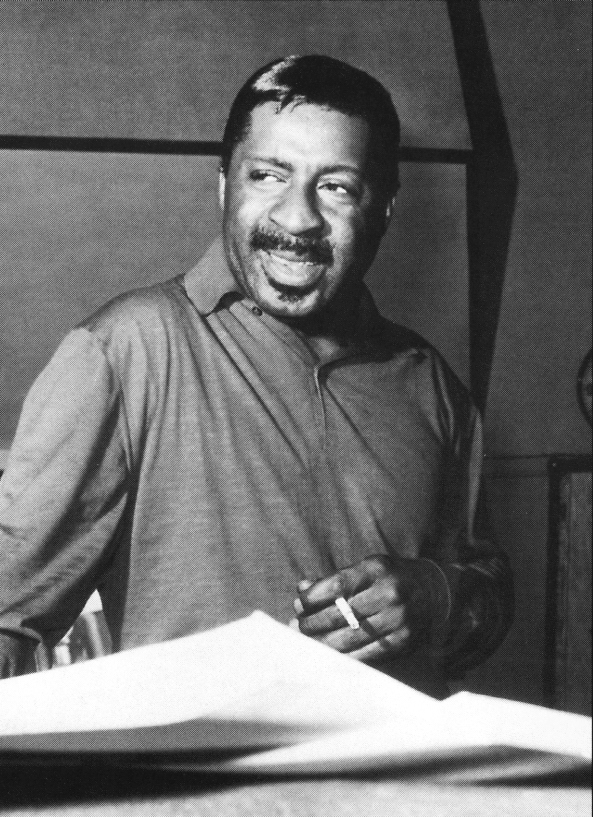
Garner during his visit to Helsinki, Finland, in November 1964

Called "one of the most distinctive of all pianists" by critic Scott Yanow, Garner showed that a "creative jazz musician can be very popular without watering down his music" or changing his personal style. He has been described as a "brilliant virtuoso who sounded unlike anyone else", using an "orchestral approach straight from the swing era but ... open to the innovations of bop." His distinctive style could swing like no other, but some of his best recordings are ballads, such as his best-known composition, "Misty", which rapidly became a jazz standard – and was featured in Clint Eastwood's film Play Misty for Me (1971).

Garner may have been inspired by the example of Earl Hines, a fellow Pittsburgh resident who was 18 years his senior, and there were resemblances in their elastic approach to timing and use of right-hand octaves. Garner's early recordings display the influence of the stride piano style of James P. Johnson and Fats Waller. Garner's melodic improvisations generally stayed close to the theme while employing novel chord voicings and other devices. He developed a signature style that involved his right hand playing slightly behind the beat while his left strummed a steady rhythm and punctuation, creating an insouciant quality and at the same time an exciting rhythmic tension. He would also enhance the effect by accelerating and decelerating the beat in the right hand, a device nicknamed the "Russian Dragon" (rushing and dragging). The independence of his hands also was evidenced by his masterful use of three-against-four and more complicated polyrhythms between the hands. In trio settings, he often played the 3:2 son clave rhythm pattern in his left hand chording on Latin tunes, and on swing tunes, he played the similar 12/8 Rhumba clave rhythm pattern. Garner frequently improvised whimsical introductions – often in stark contrast to the rest of the tune – that left listeners and even fellow band members in suspense as to what the piece would be or when the introduction would come to an end.

Bassist Ray Brown called Garner "The Happy Man". Pianist Ross Tompkins described Garner's distinctiveness as due to "happiness".

== Back catalogue ==
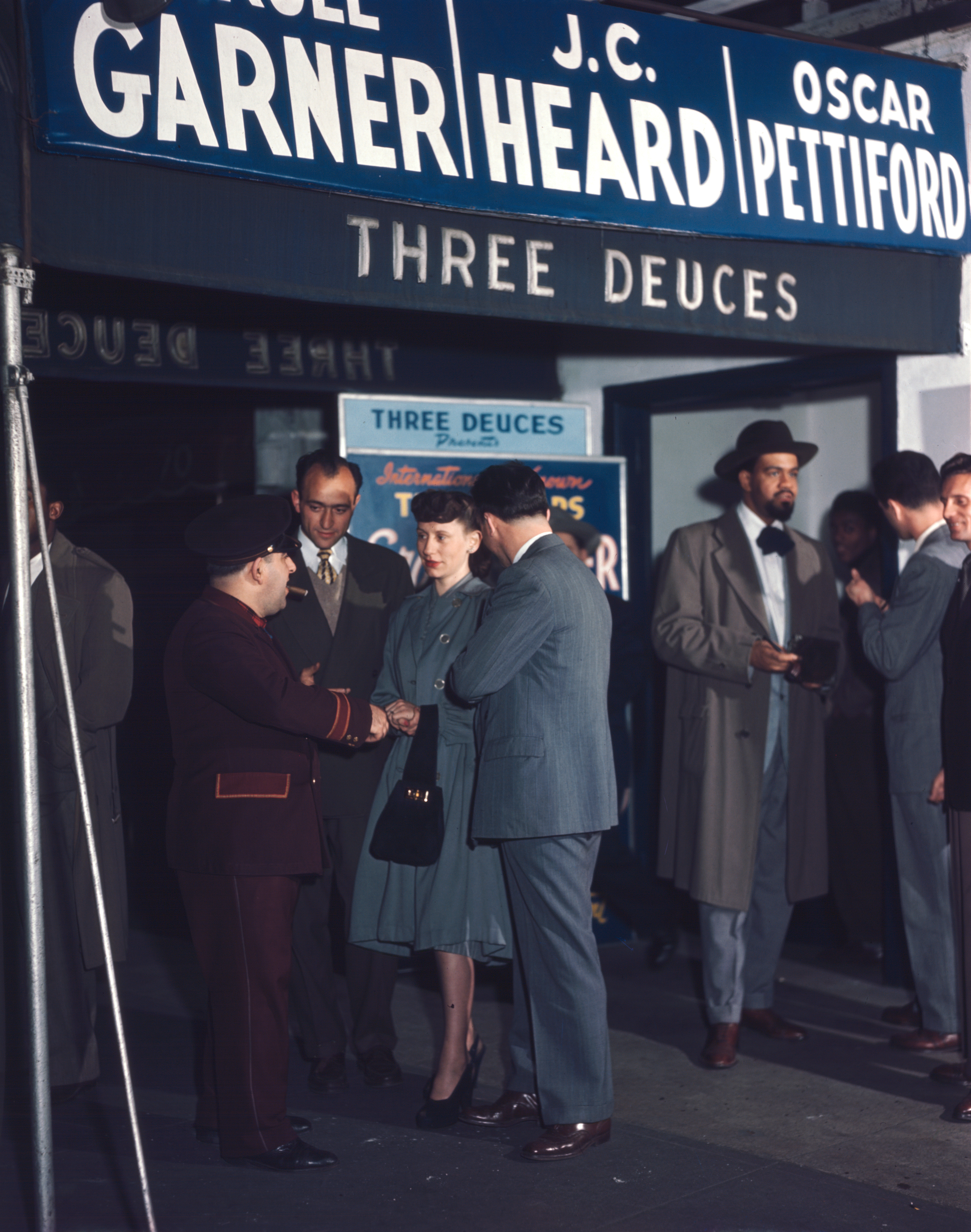
Garner's name posted on the marquee of the Three Deuces club, c. July 1948

=== Works ===
Garner's first recordings were made in late 1944 at the apartment of Timme Rosenkrantz; these subsequently were issued as the five-volume Overture to Dawn series on Blue Note Records. His recording career advanced in the late 1940s, when several sides such as "Fine and Dandy", "Skylark" and "Summertime" were cut. His 1955 live album Concert by the Sea was a best-selling jazz album in its day and features Eddie Calhoun on bass and Denzil Best on drums. This recording of a performance at the Sunset Center, a former school in Carmel-by-the-Sea, California, was made using relatively primitive sound equipment, but for George Avakian, the decision to release the recording was easy.

In 1954, Garner composed "Misty", first recording it in 1955 for the album Contrasts. Lyrics were later added by Johnny Burke. "Misty" rapidly became popular, both as a jazz standard and as the signature song of Johnny Mathis. It was also recorded by Ella Fitzgerald, Frank Sinatra, Sarah Vaughan, Ray Stevens and Aretha Franklin.

One World Concert was recorded at the 1962 Seattle World's Fair (and in 1959 stretching out in the studios) and features Eddie Calhoun on bass and Kelly Martin on drums. Other works include 1951's Long Ago and Far Away, 1953's Erroll Garner at the Piano with Wyatt Ruther and Fats Heard, 1957's The Most Happy Piano, 1970's Feeling Is Believing and 1974's Magician, on which Garner performs a number of classic standards. Often, the trio was expanded to add Latin percussion, usually a conga.

In 1964, Garner appeared in the UK on the music series Jazz 625 broadcast on BBC Two television. This program was hosted by Steve Race, who introduced Garner's trio with Eddie Calhoun on bass and Kelly Martin on drums.

Because Garner could not write down his musical ideas, he had to record them on tape to be later transcribed by others.

The Erroll Garner Club was founded in 1982 in Aberlady, Scotland. On September 26, 1992, enthusiasts of Garner ("Garnerphiles") from England, Scotland, Germany and the U.S. met in London for a unique and historic get-together. The guests of honour were Eddie Calhoun (bassist) and Kelly Martin (drummer), Garner's rhythm section from the mid-1950s to the mid-1960s. On June 15, 1996, many of the UK's Garnerphiles converged in Cheltenham for an afternoon of music, food and fun on what would have been Garner's 75th birthday. That evening, they learned of the death of jazz legend Ella Fitzgerald.

=== Archive and newly discovered material ===
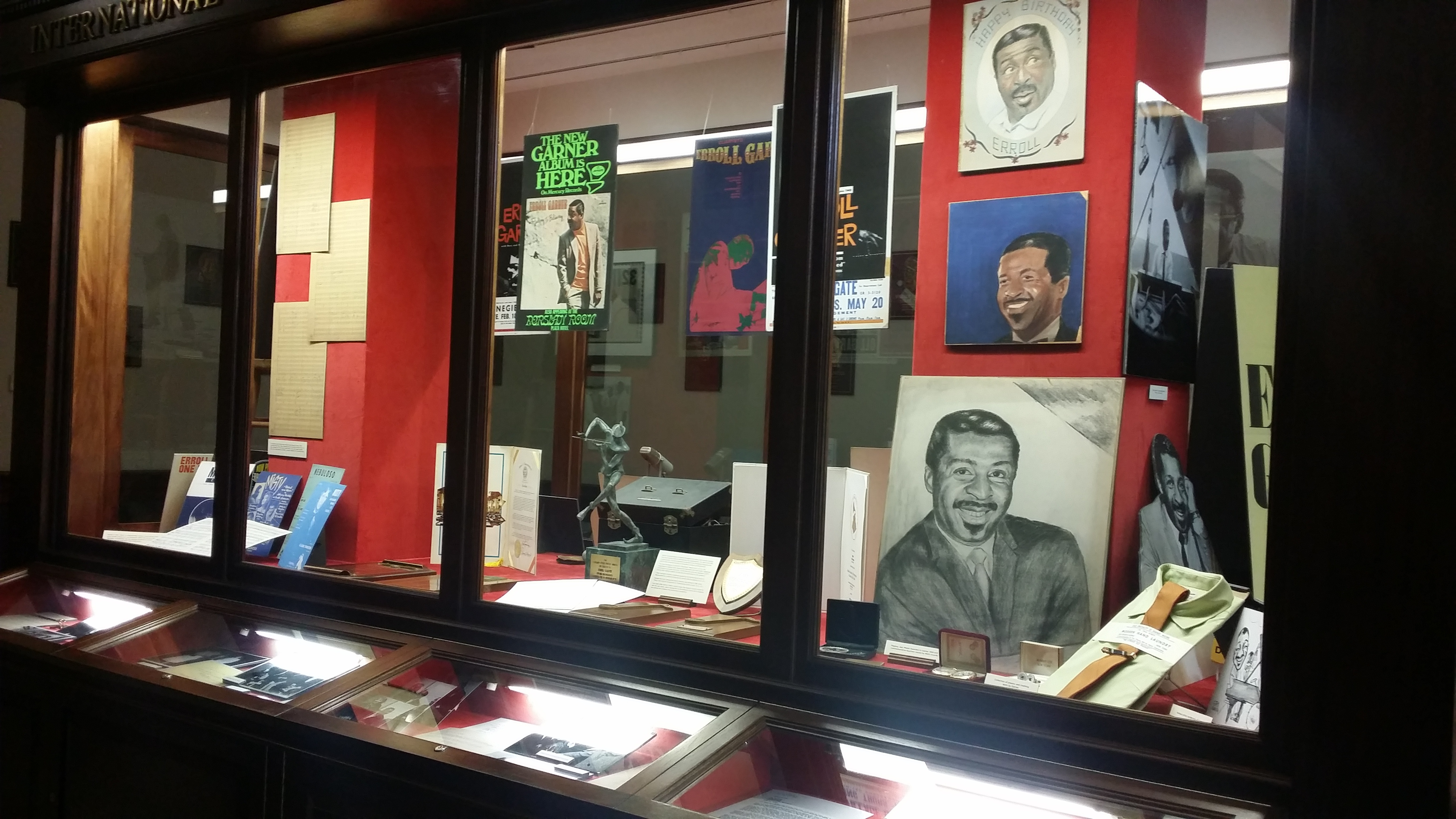
An exhibit in the University of Pittsburgh's William Pitt Union from the Erroll Garner Archive

In 2012, a film on Garner was released by Atticus Brady called No One Can Hear You Read, which Garner used to say when asked why he had never learned to read music. Footage of the piano prodigy playing and speaking was intercut with interviews: with admirers (including Woody Allen, Steve Allen and his fellow musicians Ahmad Jamal, also from Pittsburgh, and Ernest McCarty, his bassist for many years); with family members, including his older sister Ruth Garner Moore and daughter Kim Garner; with George Avakian, the producer of Concert by the Sea; and with Jim Doran, his biographer. The film attempts to address Garner's fall from prominence after his death, reminding viewers how popular and original he was in his day as well as why he is considered in many quarters a legend, one of the true greats of jazz.

On June 15, 2015, the estate of Martha Glaser, Garner's long-time manager, announced the formation of the Erroll Garner Jazz Project, a major new archival and musical celebration of Garner. The project includes the donation of the Erroll Garner Archive – a huge trove of newly discovered historical material from Garner's life – to the University of Pittsburgh.

On September 18, 2015, Concert by the Sea was re-released by Sony Legacy in an expanded, three-CD edition that adds 11 previously unreleased tracks.

On September 30, 2016, Ready Take One was released on Sony Legacy/Octave, featuring 14 previously unreleased tracks.

On July 13, 2018, a live concert recording of Garner playing in 1964 at the Concertgebouw in the Netherlands was released by Mack Avenue Records with the title Nightconcert.

Garner was posthumously featured on the track "All Night Parking" with Adele on her fourth studio album, 30 (2021). The song is built around a sample of Joey Pecoraro's "Finding Parking" (2017), which in turn samples Garner's 1964 live performance of his song "No More Shadows" on the BBC television program Jazz 625.

=== Publishing rights ===
In 2016, Downtown Music Publishing entered an exclusive worldwide administration agreement with Octave Music Publishing Corp. The deal covers all of Garner's works including "Misty", as well as Garner's extensive archive of master recordings, many of which remain unreleased.

== Discography ==
- 1945–1949: Penthouse Serenade (Savoy MG12002)
- 1945–1949: Serenade To Laura (Savoy MG12003)
- 1947: Giants of the Piano (Roost 2213; Vogue LAE 12209) – 1947 Hollywood recordings with Red Callender and Hal West; split album with Art Tatum
- 1948: Early in Paris (Blue Music Group)
- 1949: Back to Back (Savoy MG12008) – split album with Billy Taylor
- 1949-08: Erroll Garner (2 volumes: Joker BM 3718 and BM 3719) – Los Angeles recordings with John Simmons and Alvin Stoller
- 1949–1950: The Greatest Garner (Atlantic 1227)
- 1950: Piano Moods (Columbia CL6139 [10″])
- 1951: Gems (Columbia CL6173 [10″]; 1954: Columbia CL583 [12″])
- 1952: Solo Flight (Columbia CL6209 [10″]; Philips B 07602 R [10″])
- 1953: Plays for Dancing (Columbia CL6259 [10″]; 1956: Columbia CL667 [12″])
- 1953: Erroll Garner (At the Piano) (Columbia CL535; Philips B 07015 L; reissue: CBS [UK] 62 311) – with Wyatt Ruther and Fats Heard
- 1954: Gone With Garner (EmArcy MG26042)
- 1954: Garnering (EmArcy MG36026)
- 1954: Mambo Moves Garner (Mercury MG20055)
- 1955: Contrasts (EmArcy MG36001)
- 1954–1955: Erroll! (Erroll Garner in the Land of Hi-Fi) (EmArcy MG36069)
- 1954–1955: Plays Misty (Mercury MG20662)
- 1955: Solitaire (Mercury MG20063)
- 1955: Afternoon of an Elf (Mercury MG20090)
- 1955: Gone Garner Gonest (Columbia CL617)
- 1955: Music for Tired Lovers (Columbia CL651) – with Woody Herman singing
- 1955-09-19: Concert by the Sea (Columbia CL883) – also released later in an expanded three-CD version: The Complete Concert by the Sea (2015)
- 1955: Garnerland (Columbia CL2540 [10″]) – released in Columbia's "House Party Series"
- 1956: He's Here! He's Gone! He's Garner! (Columbia CL2606 [10″]) – released in Columbia's "House Party Series"
- 1956: After Midnight (Columbia CL-834)
- 1957: The Most Happy Piano (Columbia CL939) – Italian CBS reissue: Il magico pianoforte di Erroll Garner (CBS Serie Rubino 52065, 1967)
- 1957: Other Voices (Columbia CL1014) – with Mitch Miller and orchestra
- 1957: Soliloquy (Columbia CL1060)
- 1958: Encores in Hi-Fi (Columbia CL1141)
- 1958: Paris Impressions, Vol. 1 (Columbia CL1212)
- 1958: Paris Impressions, Vol. 2 (Columbia CL1213)
- 1960: The One and Only Erroll Garner (Columbia C1452)
- 1960: Swinging Solos (Columbia CL1512)
- 1961: The Provocative Erroll Garner (Columbia CL1587)
- 1961: Dreamstreet (ABC-Paramount 365)
- 1961: Closeup in Swing (ABC-Paramount 395)
- 1962: Informal Piano Improvisations (Baronet B-109)
- 1963: One World Concert (Reprise R9-6080)
- 1963: A New Kind of Love: Erroll Garner with Full Orchestra, Conducted by Leith Stevens (Mercury SR-60859; Phillips BL 7595)
- 1964: Mr. Erroll Garner and the Maxwell Davis Trio (Crown CLP-5404)
- 1964: Serenade in Blue (Clarion 610)
- 1964-11-07: Amsterdam Concert (Philips BL 7717; Philips 632 204 BL)
- 1965: Erroll Garner Plays (Ember FA 2011)
- 1965: Now Playing: A Night at the Movies (MGM SE-4335)
- 1966: Campus Concert (MGM SE-4361)
- 1967: That's My Kick (MGM SE-4463)
- 1968: Up in Erroll's Room (Featuring 'The Brass Bed') (MGM SE-4520; Pye International NSPL.28123)
- 1970: Feeling is Believing (Mercury SR-61308)
- 1972: Gemini (London XPS-617)
- 1974: Magician (London APS-640)
- 1975: Play it Again, Erroll! (Columbia PG-33424) – double album
- 1976: The Elf: The Savoy Sessions (Savoy SJL-2207) – double album
- 1976: Erroll Garner Plays Gershwin & Kern (Polydor [fr] 2445 030; 1985: EmArcy 826 224)
- 1978: Yesterdays (Savoy SJL-1118)
- 1987: Long Ago and Far Away (Columbia CK-40863)
- 1991: Body & Soul (Columbia CK-47035)
- 2003: Erroll Garner's Finest Hour (Verve 589 775)
- 2015: The Complete Concert by the Sea (Columbia/Legacy 888751208421 [3-CD set])
- 2016: The Real... Erroll Garner (The Ultimate Collection) (Sony Music 889853056323 [3-CD set])
- 2016: Ready Take One (Octave Music/Legacy 889853633128)
- 2018: Nightconcert (Mack Avenue)
- 2021: Adele, "All Night Parking", 30 (Columbia/[Melted Stone])
