= Misty (song) =

1954 instrumental with lyrics added in 1959

- Artwork for US 7-inch single

Single by Johnny Mathis

from the album Heavenly
- B-side: "The Story of Our Love"
- Released: September 14, 1959
- Recorded: April 9, 1959
- Studio: Columbia 30th Street Studio, New York City
- Length: 3:38
- Label: Columbia
- Songwriters: Johnny Burke, Erroll Garner
- Producers: Mitch Miller, Al Ham

Johnny Mathis singles chronology
"Small World" / "You Are Everything to Me" (1959)	"Misty" / "The Story of Our Love" (1959)	"The Best of Everything" (1959)

Official audio
- "Misty" on YouTube

"Misty" is a jazz standard written and originally recorded in 1954 by pianist Erroll Garner. He composed it as an instrumental in the traditional 32-bar format, and recorded it on July 27, 1954, for the album Contrasts. Lyrics were added later by Johnny Burke. It appeared on Johnny Mathis's 1959 album Heavenly, and this recording reached number 12 on the US Pop Singles chart later that year. It has since become one of Mathis's signature songs.

The song has been recorded by many other artists, including versions by Ella Fitzgerald and Sarah Vaughan. Ray Stevens released a hit country version in 1975. Recordings by both Johnny Mathis and Erroll Garner have been inducted into the Grammy Hall of Fame. It was ranked number 174 in the list of the Songs of the Century compiled by Recording Industry Association of America and National Endowment for the Arts.

== Composition ==
Erroll Garner was inspired to write "Misty" on a flight from San Francisco to Chicago which passed through a thunderstorm: as the plane descended into O'Hare airport, Garner looked through the window to see a rainbow glowing through a haze and was moved to begin composing "Misty" on the spot, striking imaginary piano keys on his knees as he hummed the notes he imagined (causing his neighboring passenger to summon a flight attendant to assist the apparently ill Garner).

The lyrics were added later by Johnny Burke. Burke was initially reluctant to create lyrics for the tune but was persuaded to do so at the insistence of his pianist, Herb Mesick. It was said that Mesick played the tune every time Burke came into the room, until Burke said: "Alright, give me the damn music, and I'll do it." Burke wrote the lyrics in two to three hours.

== Early recordings ==
Erroll Garner first recorded his rendition of "Misty" on piano on July 27, 1954, accompanied by Wyatt Ruther on bass and Fats Heard on drums. The recording was first released in October 1954 and credited to the Erroll Garner Trio, and it was included in Garner's album Contrasts released in December 1954. Garner later re-recorded the song with an orchestral arrangement by Mitch Miller for his album Other Voices in 1957. Instrumental versions were also recorded by Georgie Auld and Johnny Costa in 1955. Garner's original recording was ranked No. 174 in the list of the Songs of the Century compiled by RIAA and NEA.

After lyrics were written for "Misty", Dakota Staton was the first to record the song in 1957. A number of artists also recorded the song, but it was the recording by Sarah Vaughan that drew greater attention to it. Sarah Vaughan recorded the song in a July 1958 Paris session, with an arrangement by Quincy Jones for her album Vaughan and Violins. It was released backed with "Broken Hearted Melody", and it reached No. 6 on the Bubbling Under chart in July 1959. Those who recorded the song after Sarah Vaughan included Count Basie, Ella Fitzgerald, and most notably Johnny Mathis, who created the best-known version of it.

== Johnny Mathis version ==
=== Background ===
Johnny Mathis first heard Erroll Garner play the tune when he was a teenager and told Garner that he would love to sing it if Garner had lyrics for it. A few years later, having heard Sarah Vaughan's version of the song, he chose "Misty" as one of the possible songs for his 1959 album Heavenly and informed Erroll Garner that he would record the song. However, at the recording session for the album, it was scheduled that Johnny Mathis should record a show tune rather than "Misty". Accounts differ as to whether it was Erroll Garner or his business manager, Martha Glaser, who turned up unexpectedly at the recording session, and Johnny Mathis then insisted on recording "Misty" to fulfil his promise to record the song with the unexpected guest in attendance.

Glenn Osser arranged the song at short notice, with Andy Ackers playing the piano. Johnny Mathis revealed that, on the high-pitched note when he first started singing "On my own" after the instrumental break, he used a technique of standing a distance from the microphone and then walked slowly toward it to create a fade in effect. Johnny Mathis said that "Misty" was the song of which he was the most proud, because he recorded the song the way he wanted to, rather than relying on the producer, Mitch Miller.

The song was initially released as a back-to-back single together with Garner's version intended only for those in the broadcasting industry, but due to heavy demand Columbia released Mathis' recording as a commercial single in September 1959. It reached No. 12 on Billboard Hot 100. Although the song is not Mathis' highest-charting song, it became his signature song. Mathis received his first Grammy nomination for the song at the 3rd Annual Grammy Awards in the Best Male Pop Vocal Performance category. Both Mathis' and Garner's recordings were inducted into the Grammy Hall of Fame, Garner in 1991 and Mathis in 2002.

=== Charts ===
Chart (1959–1960)	Peak position
UK Singles (Official Charts)	12
US Billboard Hot 100	12
US Hot R&B/Hip-Hop Songs (Billboard)	10

== Play Misty for Me ==
Clint Eastwood used the instrumental version in his 1971 directorial debut film Play Misty for Me, a low-budget film that proved to be a box-office success. Eastwood was said to have paid Garner a $25,000 fee for the right to use the tune in his film.

== Ray Stevens version ==
"Misty"
- Side A of the US single

Single by Ray Stevens

from the album Misty
- B-side: "Sunshine"
- Released: April 1975
- Recorded: c. February 1975
- Genre: Country
- Label: Barnaby
- Songwriter: Erroll Garner
- Producer: Ray Stevens

Ray Stevens singles chronology
"Moonlight Special" (1974)	"Misty" (1975)	"Indian Love Call" (1975)

Official audio
- "Misty" on YouTube

=== Background and release ===
In 1975, singer Ray Stevens released an up-tempo country rendition of this song. It is the title track of his twelfth studio album. Stevens recounted that the song was recorded on the second take when experimenting in the studio. His version won a Grammy in the category of Music Arrangement of the Year. This version peaked at No. 14 on the Billboard Hot 100 and reached No. 2 in the United Kingdom.

=== Charts ===
==== Weekly charts ====
Chart (1975)	Peak position
Austria (Ö3 Austria Top 40)	11
Australia (Kent Music Report)	5
Canada Country Singles (RPM)	2
Canada Top Singles (RPM)	15
Canada Adult Contemporary (RPM)	6
Ireland (IRMA)	2
New Zealand (Recorded Music NZ)	11
UK Singles (Official Charts)	2
US Billboard Hot Country Singles	3
US Billboard Hot 100	14
US Billboard Easy Listening	8

==== Year-end charts ====
Chart (1975)	Position
Australia (Kent Music Report)	39
Canada RPM Top Singles	135
New Zealand	28
UK	23
US Billboard Hot 100	91

== Other versions ==
- Count Basie, Dance Along with Basie (1959)
- Bing Crosby recorded the song in 1961 for use on his radio show, and it was included on several of his later albums.
- Aretha Franklin, Yeah!!! (1965)
- Lesley Gore recorded a version of "Misty" for her debut album, I'll Cry If I Want To (1963). The recording was used in a TikTok trend (in which a user would show themselves without a feature, such as glasses, and then show a different person with that feature) and reached number-one on the TikTok Billboard Top 50 chart in January 2024.
- Groove Holmes hit the Hot 100 with his version (1966)
- Jim Bajor did a cover version for the 1995 album, "Somewhere in Time."
- Samara Joy recorded a version of Misty for her album Linger Awhile (2022)
- Laufey recorded a version of Misty for her album Bewitched (2023)
- Marty Robbins included a version on his album Marty After Midnight (1962)
