= Steve Arnold =

Steve, Steven or Stephen Arnold may refer to:

- Steve Arnold (racing driver) (born 1971), British race car driver
- Steve Arnold (footballer, born 1951), English former footballer
- Steve Arnold (footballer, born 1989), English footballer
- Steve Arnold (venture capitalist), American biotechnology investor and co-founder of Polaris Partners
- Stephen Arnold (composer), American jingle writer
  - Stephen Arnold Music, a Dallas-based music production company
- Stephen Arnold (scientist), professor at the Polytechnic Institute of New York University
- Steven Arnold (born 1974), English actor
- Steven F. Arnold (1943–1994), American artist
- Steven L. Arnold (born 1940), U.S. Army lieutenant general
