= Session musician =

Musician hired to perform in recording sessions or live performances

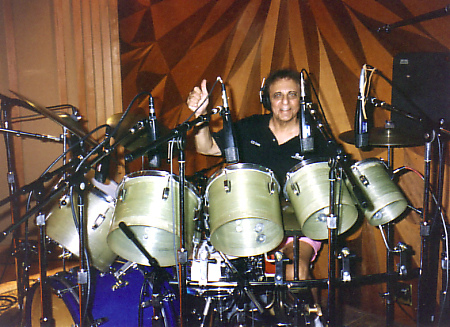
Session musician Hal Blaine (pictured in 1995) is widely regarded as one of the most prolific drummers in rock and roll history, having "certainly played on more hit records than any drummer in the rock era".

A session musician (also known as studio musician or backing musician) is a musician hired to perform in a recording session or a live performance. The term sideman is also used in the case of live performances, such as accompanying a recording artist on a tour. Session musicians are usually not permanent or official members of a musical ensemble or band.

Many session musicians specialize in playing common rhythm section instruments such as guitar, piano, bass, or drums. Others are specialists, and play brass, woodwinds, and strings. Many session musicians play multiple instruments, which lets them play in a wider range of musical situations, genres, and styles. Examples of "doubling" include double bass and electric bass, acoustic guitar and mandolin, piano and accordion, and saxophone and other woodwind instruments.

Session musicians are used when musical skills are needed on a short-term basis. Typically, session musicians are used by recording studios to provide backing tracks for other musicians for recording sessions and live performances, recording music for advertising, film, television, and theatre.

In the 2000s, the terms "session musician" and "studio musician" were synonymous, though in past decades, "studio musician" meant a musician associated with a single record company, recording studio or entertainment agency.

Session musicians rarely achieve mainstream fame in their own right as soloists or bandleaders. However, top session musicians are well-known within the music industry. Some have become publicly recognized, such as the Wrecking Crew, the Muscle Shoals Rhythm Section and The Funk Brothers who worked with Motown Records.

== Approaches ==
Session musicians may play in a wide range of genres or specialize in a specific genre (e.g., country music or jazz). Some session musicians with a classical music background may focus on film score recordings. Even within a specific genre specialization, there may be even more focused sub-specializations. For example, a sub-specialization within trumpet session players is "high note specialist."

The working schedule for session musicians often depends on the terms set out by musicians' unions or associations, as these organizations typically set out rules on performance schedules (e.g., regarding the length of sessions and breaks). The length of employment may be as short as a single day, in the case of recording a brief demo song, or as long as several weeks if an album or film score is being recorded.

Musicians' associations and unions often set out the remuneration terms. Some musicians may get the minimum scale rate set out by the union. Heavily in-demand session musicians may earn much more. The union rates may vary based on whether it is a music recording versus a film/television recording. While the film/television rates may be lower, there may also be residual payments to compensate them for reruns, DVD sales, streaming usage, and so on.

Session musicians often have to bring their own instruments, such as in the case of guitar, bass, woodwinds, and brass. It is expected that studio musicians will have well-maintained professional-tier instruments. In some cases, larger or heavier instruments may be provided by the recording studio, such as a grand piano or Hammond organ and Leslie speaker. In certain cases, a session musicians may bring some instruments or musical gear and use them with larger instruments that are provided by the studio, such as a synthesizer player, who might bring rack-mounted synth modules and connect them to the studio's MIDI controller stage piano. Similarly, if the studio has a selection of well-known bass amplifiers, and speaker cabinets, a bass player may only have to bring bass guitars and effect units.

The requirement to read different types of music notation, improvise and/or "play by ear" varies according to the type of recording session and the genres of music being performed. Classical musicians and many jazz and popular music musicians are expected to read music notation and do sight-reading. In jazz, rock, and many popular music genres, performers may be expected to read chord charts and improvise accompaniment and solos. In country music, performers may be expected to read Nashville Number System charts and improvise accompaniment and solos. In many traditional and folk music styles, performers are expected to be able to play by ear.

Session musicians need a nuanced sense of the playing styles and idioms used in different genres. For example, a sax player who mainly plays jazz needs to know the R&B style, if they are asked to improvise a solo in an R&B song. Similarly, a bass player asked to improvise a walking bassline in a rockabilly song needs to know the stock lines and clichés used in this genre.

Regardless of the styles of music session musicians play, some qualities are universal: punctuality in arriving at the session; rhythmic and intonation precision; ability to play with good ensemble and excellent blending with the other performers; willingness to take direction from bandleaders, music directors, and music producers; and having good musical taste in regards to choices with musical ornaments and musical phrasing.

== History ==
=== 1950s–1960s ===
During the 1950s and 1960s, session players were usually active in local recording scenes concentrated in places such as Los Angeles, New York City, Nashville, Memphis, Detroit, and Muscle Shoals. Each local scene had its circle of "A-list" session musicians, such as The Nashville A-Team that played on numerous country and rock hits of the era, the two groups of musicians in Memphis, both the Memphis Boys and the musicians who backed Stax/Volt recordings, and the Funk Brothers in Detroit, who played on many Motown recordings.

At the time, multi-tracking equipment, though common, was less elaborate, and instrumental backing tracks were often recorded "hot" with an ensemble playing live in the studio. Musicians had to be available "on call" when producers needed a part to fill a last-minute time slot. In the 1960s, Los Angeles was considered the top recording destination in the United States — consequently studios were constantly booked around the clock, and session time was highly sought after and expensive. Songs had to be recorded quickly in the fewest possible takes. In this environment, Los Angeles producers and record executives had little patience for needless expense or wasted time and depended on the service of reliable standby musicians who could be counted on to record in a variety of styles with minimal practice or takes, and deliver hits on short order.

== Studio band ==
A studio band is a musical ensemble that is in the employ of a recording studio for the purpose of accompanying recording artists who are customers of the studio. The use of studio bands was more common during the 1960s with groups such Booker T. & the M.G.'s. The benefit of having a regular group, an approach which typified Southern soul, is that the group has much more experience playing together, which enables them to get a better sense of ensemble.

=== Notable groups ===
- The Nashville A-Team (Nashville, 1950s–1960s)

Studio musicians who recorded during the Nashville sound era. Their contributions began in the 1950s with artists such as Elvis Presley. The original A-Team includes bassist Bob Moore; guitarists Grady Martin, Hank Garland, Ray Edenton, and Harold Bradley; drummer Buddy Harman; pianists Floyd Cramer and Hargus "Pig" Robbins; fiddler Tommy Jackson; steel guitarist Pete Drake; harmonicist Charlie McCoy; saxophonist Boots Randolph; and vocal groups The Jordanaires and The Anita Kerr Singers. Cramer, McCoy, and Randolph, along with later A-Teamer and producer Chet Atkins, would later emerge as part of Hee Haw's Million Dollar Band in the 1980s.

- The Brill Building Sound (New York City, 1960s)

A collection of musicians based at the Brill Building at 1619 Broadway and the Aldon Music Allegro Studios at 1650 Broadway. The two locations were already producing popular music in the 1940s as Tin Pan Alley had been waning; it was in the late 1950s and early 1960s that a distinct Brill Building sound began to coalesce, which backed musicians such as The Four Seasons, Neil Sedaka, Bobby Darin, and the early girl groups associated with Phil Spector, who later built upon his work at the Brill Building into his more famous Wall of Sound. Many of the Brill Building studio musicians were themselves recording artists and songwriters.

- Booker T. & the M.G.'s (Memphis, 1960s–1970s)

The house band at Stax records in Memphis during the 1960s and 1970s, playing behind Otis Redding, Eddie Floyd, Sam and Dave, Isaac Hayes, The Staple Singers, and others. M.G.'s guitarist Steve Cropper co-wrote many of Redding's hits, and the M.G.'s produced albums and hit singles such as "Green Onions" in their own right while being the house band at Stax.

- The Wrecking Crew (Los Angeles, 1960s–1970s)

Prolific, established studio musicians based in Los Angeles, among which bassist Carol Kaye stands out as one of the rare female instrumentalists. They have recorded many songs and albums since the 1960s.

- The Ron Hicklin Singers (Los Angeles, 1960s-1980s)

A vocal session group closely associated with the Wrecking Crew and appeared as backing vocalists on many of the Crew's recordings, including T.V. and movie themes and radio and television commercials.

- The Blossoms (Los Angeles, 1950s-1970s)

An all-female vocal group featuring Darlene Love, which was closely associated with the Wrecking Crew and with Phil Spector, appeared as backing vocalists on many of their recordings. From 1964 to 1966, they were featured vocalists on the weekly rock' n' roll television program Shindig!

- The Funk Brothers (Detroit, 1960s–1970s)

Session musicians who backed many Motown Records recordings from the late 1950s to the early 1970s as well as a few non-Motown recordings, notably on Jackie Wilson's "(Your Love Keeps Lifting Me) Higher and Higher".

- The Andantes (Detroit, 1960s-1970s)

An all-female trio of backing vocalists who backed many Motown Records artists from the late 1950s to the early 1970s as well as a few non-Motown artists, including Jackie Wilson, Betty Everett, and John Lee Hooker. Closely associated with the Funk Brothers.

- The Memphis Boys (Memphis, 1960s)

Session musicians who served as American Sound Studio's house band. They backed such artists as Aretha Franklin, Elvis Presley, Wilson Pickett, Joe Tex, Neil Diamond, and Dusty Springfield, among others.

- The Section (Los Angeles, 1960s–1970s)

A Los Angeles singer/songwriter scene associated with the Troubadour nightclub and Laurel Canyon in the late 1960s to mid-1970s was supported by musicians Russ Kunkel, Danny Kortchmar, Leland Sklar and Craig Doerge. This session combo, nicknamed "the Section" or "the Mafia," backed many musicians, among others: Carole King, James Taylor, Jackson Browne, Warren Zevon, Kris Kristofferson and David Crosby.

- The Muscle Shoals Rhythm Section (Memphis, 1960s)

A group comprising Barry Beckett, Roger Hawkins, David Hood, and Jimmy Johnson, also known as the Swampers, became known for the "Muscle Shoals Sound." Many of the recordings done in the Memphis area, which included Muscle Shoals, Alabama, used The Memphis Horns in their arrangements.

- MFSB (Philadelphia, 1970s)

MFSB ("Mother Father Sister Brother") was a group of soul music studio musicians based in Philadelphia at the Sigma Sound Studios; they later went on to become a name-brand instrumental group, and their best-known hit was "TSOP (The Sound of Philadelphia)," better known as the theme from Soul Train.

- The Hillside Singers (1970s)

A vocal group commissioned to provide vocals for Mayoham Music, formed by husband and wife Al Ham and Mary Mayo (the latter of whom was also a member of the group). The group is best known for their jingles and television news themes. "I'd Like to Teach the World to Sing (In Perfect Harmony)," originally composed as a jingle for Coca-Cola, became a surprise hit and the source of the group's recording name, as the Coca-Cola commercial featured singers on a hillside. The New Seekers would have an even larger hit with the same song. Their best-known news theme was "Move Closer to Your World," associated with Capital Cities Communications' Action News local news format.

- Salsoul Orchestra (New York, 1970s–1980s)

Session musicians who backed many Salsoul Records recordings from 1974 to 1982. Under their own name, they recorded and released several hit singles and albums between 1975 and 1982.

- Compass Point All Stars (Nassau, 1970s–1980s)

Session musicians who served as the house band at Compass Point Studios.

== See also ==
- Offstage musicians and singers in popular music
