= Move Closer to Your World =

Theme music for news programs

Move Closer to Your World (MCTYW) is a television news music package composed in 1970 by Walt Liss and released by jingle writer Al Ham under his Mayoham Music label.

Since the 1970s, it was considered an anthem for local television news, notably of WPVI-TV in Philadelphia for its Action News broadcasts. An original long version was sung by The Hillside Singers, and a short clip of that vocal version is used by WPVI as part of their closing theme song when extra fill-in time is required. Once a common theme across the United States (especially among other stations using the Action News format), as of 2023, only two U.S. stations currently use the theme or a variant thereof: WPVI-TV, and WNEP-TV in Scranton, Pennsylvania.

== History ==
When the Action News format debuted in 1970, WPVI (then WFIL-TV) commissioned its first theme from Tom Sellers, a student at Temple University, and his group The Assembled Multitude. Sellers's "Action News Theme" bore similarities to the later "Move Closer to Your World," being in the same key and centered around a trumpet lead and a timpani-driven climactic finish, but had more of a jazz rock arrangement.

During the time that the station was owned by Triangle Publications, the Sellers theme and Action News format were distributed among the other stations it owned; stations other than WPVI continued to use that theme into the 1990s. In 1972, Triangle exited the television business and sold WPVI to Capital Cities Communications. Al Ham, an established session music composer and arranger with several other themes to his credit, and Liss, a Capital Cities executive who was based at WKBW-TV in Buffalo, New York at the time, shared writing credits. A May 2022 obituary credited Liss only as the lyricist for the theme, with Ham as the composer. The song had been used at WNAC-TV in Boston, Massachusetts since 1970; when WNAC's Mel Kampmann moved to WPVI in 1972, he brought the theme with him, aided by the fact that WKBW was also a Capital Cities station. "Move Closer to Your World" would be distributed across Capital Cities' stations along with a slightly modified version of WPVI's Action News format. Eventually, other stations outside the former Triangle stations and Capital Cities cluster also took on the format.

"Move Closer to Your World" remained a popular news theme through the rest of the 20th century and was not removed from most stations until the late 1990s, when more modern themes were introduced. Other than the two stations still using it, WKBW, continued to use the theme until 2003, then (after its replacement was deemed to be one factor in the station's fall to a distant last place) used the theme again from 2008 to 2014.

== Versions ==
MCTYW '72
The original version composed by Liss; performed in the key of A. This version was the only one to include the full lyrics. Four "verses" were included in the package, an instrumental version, a choral version sung by Ham's Hillside Singers, a version that featured a jazz piano descant, and a version that was sung solo as if it were a ballad with a Liberace-style piano embellishment. This was the most commonly used in the United States from the 1970s through the 1980s. A slightly sped-up "cut" of this version, raised to B♭, cut out all but the fanfare and, from the 1980s onward, was the primary version used on the remaining stations still using the theme. It was also used on KFSN-TV in Fresno, WJET-24 in Erie, WWCP-TV in Johnstown, and KTRK-TV in Houston. WPVI uses portions of the original theme to this day and the song is still immensely popular in Philadelphia.

MCTYW '80
Debuting on ATV-10 in Melbourne, Australia where it was used from 1981 to early 1988, this version is brassier in instrumentation with a slightly more disco feel, and is performed in B minor. It has, to date, never been used in the United States.

MCTYW '89
Debuted on WKBW-TV, where it was used from 1989 to 1995 during the "NewsChannel 7" era. This version was a new-age arrangement featuring a dominant synthesizer instead of the brass band. This version, returning to the original key of A, was replaced in 1995 with a remixed version of the B♭ cut.

MCTYW '91
This updated version of the song, arranged by Cliff Schwarz, is currently heard on WNEP-TV in Scranton (as well as its various sister stations) and was used during the 1990s at WPXI-TV in Pittsburgh. It has sometimes been referred to as a "dance version." It also does have a softer side. The second half of this update was the theme for the Nightbeat newscast on WPXI.

MCTYW '96
Debuted on WPVI-TV and performed by either the Sinfonia of London or members of the London Philharmonic Orchestra and the London Symphony Orchestra, arranged and produced by Tom Hedden of NFL Films. In an effort to make the song more thunderous and authoritative, WPVI commissioned this orchestral arrangement of the song in 1996. Fan and public reaction was resoundingly negative upon its debut on September 20, 1996, and "Cut One" was reinstated after only three days. In 2024, it was found that the version that made it to air was an incomplete mix that had mysteriously arrived in Philadelphia, and that NFL Films was about to begin the mixing process when the station announced that they would return to "Cut One". Former station management insisted that the tape received was a complete mix. In a documentary short produced by WPVI entitled "The Mix Of '96 - The Day Action News Changed Its Anthem", Hedden returned to the original multi-track recording and completed a new, finalized mix that plays at the end of the video.

This Just In by 615 Music
This version is designated as "production music" by the company, and is not intended as a main news piece. Its best known use is as the theme for the fictional "NewsChannel 7" on the Disney Channel TV series Lizzie McGuire. Nevertheless, noncommercial station WEIU-TV in Springfield, IL and a handful of stations in Puerto Rico have used it as a main theme. WKBW uses this version in commercial advertisements.

WPVI-TV Action News Arrangements by 615 Music
This is used only for news promos for WPVI-TV's upcoming newscast and for breaking news & developing stories opens during the newscast.

Philly Rep by Eternal Life “Move Right Entertainment”
a clip of the non-vocal Al Ham version is used as an intro to a hip hop song about what is represented by Philadelphia, its people and what shapes the city's culture. The song is by Philly hip hop artist Eternal Life.
