= Educational crossover =

Crossover, sometimes referred to as cross-pollination, is a philosophical presupposition of liberal arts, great books, and integrative learning approaches to education. The value of such crossover is disputed by those who adhere to certain versions of pragmatism, especially John Dewey.

== Wiktionary ==
- Cross-pollination
