= Al Ham =

American jazz musician (1925–2001)

- Born: Albert W. Ham; February 6, 1925; Malden, Massachusetts, US
- Died: October 4, 2001 (aged 76); Spring Hill, Florida, US
- Education: Amherst College
- Occupations: Composer, jingle writer, singer

Albert W. Ham (February 6, 1925 in Malden, Massachusetts — October 4, 2001 in Spring Hill, Florida) was an American composer and jingle writer. He was notable as the composer of the Move Closer to Your World music package used since the 1970s on WPVI-TV's Action News broadcasts in Philadelphia, and, most notably, WKBW-TV's Eyewitness News, as well as on many other newscasts in the United States throughout the 1970s and 1980s. He also created the adult standards radio format Music of Your Life.

== Biography ==
Ham began as bass player for Artie Shaw when he was 17. While attending Amherst College after WWII, Ham arranged and played double bass for the Tony Pastor Orchestra when the featured singers were Rosemary Clooney and her sister Betty. When Tex Beneke re-formed the Glenn Miller Orchestra, Ham joined as arranger and bass player, working with Henry Mancini, then on staff as arranger. While working for Beneke he met and married Mary Mayo, who was singing with the Glenn Miller Orchestra.

After the birth of their daughter Lorri, Ham and his wife moved to New York in 1956 where he worked at Columbia Records. He was named director of special artists and repertoire (A&R) projects under Mitch Miller and produced records for such artists as The Ray Conniff Singers, The Ray Conniff Orchestra, Rosemary Clooney, Vic Damone, Percy Faith, Jerry Vale, Johnny Mathis, Johnnie Ray, Leslie Uggams, Kitty Callen, Guy Mitchell, The Kirby Stone Four, Tony Bennett, The Count Basie Orchestra, Frankie Laine, Jimmy Dean, The Four Lads, and Oscar Brown Jr. He was also recording director for original cast albums, and produced LPs of such Broadway hits as West Side Story, The Most Happy Fella, Gypsy, House of Flowers, and Bells Are Ringing.

During his time as a producer at Columbia, Ham brought more to the studio than his knowledge of music and his intuition for recognizing hit material. He brought an electronic knowledge that resulted in many technical studio improvements and a "spatial" sound that he put to use when he helped to create the first stereo LPs issued by Columbia. He worked with Dr. Peter Goldmark, creator of the long-playing record, on special circuit projects that broke new ground for stereo, multi-track recordings and broadcast signal processing.

In the commercial field Ham worked consistently as a composer and arranger. His commercials have won many awards for best musical theme and scoring, including Clio Awards and four gold medal winners at the International Film and Television Festivals. As arranger, composer, or both, His many commercials include State Farm Insurance ("Like a good neighbor, State Farm is there."), Breck Shampoo, McDonald's (i.e. "You Deserve a Break Today"), Gillette, Kinney Shoes, Woolco, Kodak, and Scope.

Ham also composed, arranged, and conducted news and station image music packages that have been broadcast by scores of TV stations across the country. They include "Move Closer to Your World," "Part of Your Life," "Home Country," "Bringing It Home to You," and "On Top of It All".

Ham's film credits include the score of the Electronovision version of Harlow (1965), and adaptation, scoring, and conducting of Stop the World – I Want to Get Off (1966). Ham was also programmer and associate producer of the 1964 concert film T.A.M.I. Show which featured performances by The Rolling Stones, The Beach Boys, James Brown, The Supremes, Marvin Gaye, Lesley Gore, Chuck Berry, and others.

Ham's additional musical credits include arranging and producing "I’d Like to Teach the World to Sing" by his group, the Hillside Singers (which included his wife Mary and daughter Lorri) for Metromedia Records, and the recordings he produced with his group The Midas Touch on MCA records.

In 1978, after years of research, Ham created the Music of Your Life radio format, which played on over 200 radio stations in the United States.

His television news music packages were syndicated through his company, Mayoham Music.

Ham died in October 2001 at the age of 76.
