= 615 Music =

American broadcast music production company

- Company type: Subsidiary
- Industry: Broadcast Music Production
- Founded: 1985; 41 years ago
- Headquarters: Nashville, Tennessee, U.S.
- Parent: Warner Chappell Music
- Website: 615music.com

615 Music is a broadcast production music company based in Nashville. 615 Music was founded by Randy Wachtler and composes television news music packages as well as custom image campaigns for television networks and stations around the world. 615 Music has operations in Los Angeles. The name 615 Music is derived from Nashville's area code (615), which is where the company is based.

The company composed the last three image campaigns for NBC's Today morning news/entertainment program: "Live for Today" (2005–2006), "It's a New Day" (2006–2007), and "Why I Love Today" (2008). The "Live for Today" theme was nominated for an Emmy. 615 Music has a production music library.. They also have a history working with many UPN stations, notably WWOR-TV (from 2004 - 2008).

The company and other composers of news music including Gari Communications, have seen a surge in business since the third quarter of 2006. Licensing companies had raised the prices of licensing leading to more profits. In 2007, 615 Music signed a deal with Belo Corporation becoming the exclusive provider of news music for the station group.

The company's music has also been licensed for use in movie trailers. Their track "Goth" was used in the domestic trailer for the critically acclaimed 2007 action film Live Free or Die Hard. 615 Music also produced the new official theme song for the Atlanta Braves, "The Braves Play Here" by James Otto.

On December 10, 2010, Warner Music Group announced that its Warner/Chappell publishing division had acquired 615 Music.

== See also ==
- Trailer music
