= Mary Mayo =

American singer (1924–1985)

Mary Mayo (20 July 1924 – December 1985) was an American singer who was a member of The Hillside Singers and performed at New York City nightclubs including Michael's Pub and the Copacabana.

== Early life ==
Mayo was born in Statesville, North Carolina to Lois Long and Franklin Riker, both opera singers who had returned to Long's hometown to operate the Dixie Dame Co., which manufactured "pickles with a pedigree." She attended the Juilliard School, where she studied classical singing.

== Career ==
In 1946 Mayo won a talent show run by Arthur Godfrey and worked for him briefly. After spending time performing at the Mount Royal Hotel in Montreal and alongside pianist Frankie Carle, she joined the Glenn Miller Orchestra where she was a "moonlight serenader" and performed solos.

While performing with Miller, she met and married composer Al Ham. Although the marriage was initially a secret due to a prohibition on marriages within the band, it became public after Walter Winchell broke the news.

Soon after her marriage, Mayo and Ham settled in New York, where Johnny Mercer heard a test recording of Mayo's performance of 'Blue Moon,' which led to a contract with Capitol Records. She later signed on to perform with Frank Sinatra but was cut after four weeks.

Mayo stopped performing for a decade when her daughter Lorrie was born in 1956.

She, along with her daughter, was a member of the Hillside Singers, an ensemble created by advertising agency McCann Erickson to sing the jingle "I'd Like to Teach the World to Sing (In Perfect Harmony)" in a 1971 television commercial for Coca-Cola. Following on the success of the ad, the group recorded a full album and Christmas album.

== Personal life ==
Mayo was married to composer Al Ham with whom she had a daughter, singer Lorri Ham. They later divorced. She died at St. Luke's Roosevelt Hospital Center in 1985 after a brief illness.
