= Mel Kampmann =

Mel Kampmann (10 January 1930 - 12 July 2016) was the creator of Action News. He earned an Emmy Award for Outstanding Newscast.

== Life and career ==
Melvin John Kampmann was born in Santa Monica, California. He joined the US Air Force, and was an air traffic controller in the Korean War. He later moved to Fresno, California, where he became a late-night TV movie host, as well as a radio announcer. He afterwards moved to Los Angeles, and began working in TV news. He then worked in San Francisco and as a news director in Denver, Colorado.

After moving to Philadelphia, he joined WFIL (later named WPVI). Working with WFIL, Kampmann created the Action News format in part to compete with the narrative use of storytelling that Eyewitness News at the Philadelphia KYW station had started using. He coined the term "Action News" for the TV format with a "fast pace, tight writing and high story count, with the goal of covering more stories in the same amount of time as competitors." Along with Larry Pollock and Pat Palillo, the Trentonian describes Kampmann as one of the architects of Action News. The new format allowed WPVI-TV to gain a ratings lead in the area.

After Philadelphia, he moved to Fargo, North Dakota as a station manager, then moved to Washington, D.C.. While VP of News and Public Affairs at WJLA in D.C., he earned an Emmy Award for Outstanding Newscast. In 1980, the communications consulting firm Mel Kampmann Associates was formed in D.C. Later in his career, he founded International Communications Group.
