= George Lucas Educational Foundation =

American nonprofit publisher

The George Lucas Educational Foundation
- Named after: George Lucas
- Predecessor: The Media Tree
- Formation: 1991; 35 years ago (Note: This date has been widely reported, but is debatable. See § Organizational history for details.)
- Founders: George Lucas; Steve Arnold
- Founded at: Marin County, California
- Type: Nonprofit
- Tax ID no.: EIN 680065687
- Headquarters: Skywalker Ranch; San Rafael, California
- Coordinates: 38.063534°N 122.652402°W
- Region served: United States
- Products: Edutopia.org; Edutopia magazine
- Chairman: George Lucas
- Vice Chairman: Steve Arnold
- Executive Director: Cindy Johanson
- Website: glef.org

The George Lucas Educational Foundation is a nonprofit publisher that documents and publicizes exemplary K-12 education practices and programs, especially through video. It does this primarily through the Edutopia website.

== Organizational history ==
An organization named "The Media Tree" was founded on 4 August 1983 in Mill Valley, California by John Korty and others. It engaged in public relations for media content creators to the public of Marin County. On 4 September 1990, the organization was renamed to "The George Lucas Educational Foundation". The George Lucas Educational Foundation is widely reported to have been founded in 1991 by George Lucas and Steve Arnold. Lucas originally planned for the foundation to develop technology for schools, but soon determined that schools were not interested or able to use this technology. The foundation was one of the first philanthropies to invest in digital learning technology.

The foundation does not usually provide grants. In 2006, Lucas donated $175 million to his alma mater the University of Southern California through the foundation.

In 2010, the foundation had a $6 million annual budget and eighteen full-time staff. In 2012, the Foundation significantly increased its assets when it received the majority of the proceeds from the $4.05 billion sale of Lucasfilm to The Walt Disney Company

== Publications ==
=== Print publications ===
About 1994, the Foundation began publishing a newsletter entitled Edutopia. In September 2004, the foundation launched a free glossy magazine, also titled Edutopia with educators as the target audience. From its inception, the print magazine had 85,000 subscribers. By 2006, it has 100,000 subscribers. The print magazine was discontinued in Spring 2010. but the website continued as an online magazine.

=== Edutopia.org ===
The Edutopia.org website was started in 2002. In 2009, the foundation launched an advertising campaign, leading the website to receive 300,000 readers per month in 2010, a 70% increase from 2009. Robert Pondiscio described Edutopia.org as an inspirational resource for teachers, exuding "unabashed idealism and cheerful optimism". The website features a video series titled "Schools That Work" of in-depth profiles of specific schools. Edutopia.org includes interactive features including comments, blogs, and internet forums.

== Advocacy ==
The Foundation has sometimes included in its mission spreading best practices. However, in practice, Edutopia is a nonprofit media company focused on satisfying and increasing its audience, not an educational reform advocacy organization strategizing to change educational systems. The foundation has endorsed as its core principles: "comprehensive assessment, integrated studies, project-based learning, social and emotional learning, teacher development, and technology integration". Robert Pondiscio has been critical of Edutopia's tagline "what works in public education" given the lack of empirical support for these recommendations and uncertainty about how they were developed.

== Research findings ==
Edutopia increases teachers engagement with educational best practices by packaging it in an appealing multisensory video format. Edutopia disseminates scientific/factual knowledge, technical knowledge, and practical wisdom, with a greater emphasis on practical wisdom, which includes judgments, values, and beliefs. Many of the tips and strategies on Edutopia have not been systematically researched.
