= The Assembled Multitude =

The Assembled Multitude was an instrumental ensemble, consisting entirely of studio musicians, which music producer Tom Sellers organized in Philadelphia, Pennsylvania in 1970. The "Multitude" released a self-titled album on the Atlantic Records label in 1970, which included interpreted versions of songs such as "Woodstock", "Ohio", "MacArthur Park", "While My Guitar Gently Weeps", and The Who's "Overture" from Tommy. The last of these was released as a single and reached No. 16 on the US Billboard Pop Singles chart.

Sellers died in a house fire in March 1988.

Many of the musicians in the ensemble were regulars at Sigma Sound Studios, where the album was recorded. Those musicians became, as MFSB, the backbone of Philadelphia soul, working with producers Gamble and Huff, and Thom Bell, and artists such as The O'Jays, Billy Paul, The Stylistics, and Harold Melvin & the Blue Notes.

== Singles ==
Discography from Joel Whitburn’s Top Pop Singles, 14th Edition: 1955-2012:

- "The Action News Theme" (1970, credited to Tom Sellers)
- "Overture from Tommy" (1970) US #16; CAN #6
- "Woodstock" (1970) US #79; CAN #67
- "Medley From Superstar" (1971) US #95; CAN #87; CAN-AC #9
- "Theme From 'Cosmos' (Heaven And Hell)" (1981)
