= Integrative learning =

Learning theory predicated on making connections across curricula

Integrative learning is a learning theory describing a movement toward integrated lessons helping students make connections across curricula. This higher education concept is distinct from the elementary and high school "integrated curriculum" movement.

== Term and concept ==
Integrative Learning comes in many varieties: connecting skills and knowledge from multiple sources and experiences; applying skills and practices in various settings; utilizing diverse and even contradictory points of view; and, understanding issues and positions contextually."

...making connections within a major, between fields, between curriculum, cocurriculum, or between academic knowledge and practice."

Integrated studies involve bringing together traditionally separate subjects so that students can grasp a more authentic understanding. Veronica Boix Mansilla, cofounder of the Interdisciplinary Studies Project at Project Zero, explains "when [students] can bring together concepts, methods, or languages from two or more disciplines or established areas of expertise in order to explain a phenomenon, solve a problem, create a product, or raise a new question" they are demonstrating interdisciplinary understanding. For over a decade, Project Zero researchers at the Harvard Graduate School of Education have been studying interdisciplinary work across a range of settings. They have found interdisciplinary understanding to be crucial for modern-thinking students. Developing a cognitive and social model of interdisciplinary learning is still a challenge.

Edutopia highlighted Central York High School as a "School That Works" because of its successful integrated studies approach. For example, an AP government teacher and art teacher collaborated to create a joint project that asked students to create a sculpture based on the principles presented by the AP government class. AP government teacher Dayna Laur states that, "Integrated studies projects [aim to] create a connectedness between disciplines that otherwise might seem unrelated to many students. Deliberately searching for ways in which you can mingle standards and content is imperative if you want to create truly authentic experiences because, in the world outside of the classroom, content is not stand-alone."

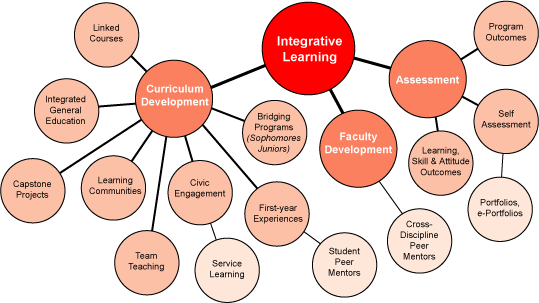
Concept map describing activities offered by universities to encourage integrative learning.

== Integrated medical curriculum ==
In many American medical schools, an integrated curriculum refers to a non-compartmentalized approach to basic science learning. As opposed to traditional medical curriculum, which separate subjects such as embryology, physiology, pathology and anatomy, integrated curricula alternate lectures on these subjects over the course of the first two years. (Jonas 1989) The course of study is instead organized around organ systems (such as "Cardiovascular" or "Gastrointestinal"). Another major component of the integrated medical curriculum is problem-based learning.

== K–12 outcomes ==
Interdisciplinary curricula has been shown by several studies to support students' engagement and learning. Specifically integrating science with reading comprehension and writing lessons has been shown to improve students' understanding in both science and English language arts.

== Bibliography ==
- Augsburg, T., & de Barros, J. A. (2010, June). Integrating different modes of inquiry for pre-service teachers. In Proceedings of the first interdisciplinary CHESS Interactions Conference (pp. 241–255).
- Awbrey, S.M, Dana, D., Miller, V.W., Robinson, P., Ryan, M.M. and Scott, D.K. (Eds.), (2006). Integrative Learning and Action: A Call to Wholeness (Studies in Education and Spirituality). New York: Peter Lang Publ.
- Brinkman, G. W., & van der Geest, T. M. (2003). Assessment of Communication Competencies in Engineering Design Projects. Technical Communication Quarterly, 12(1), 67–81.
- Czechowski, J. (2003), "An Integrated Approach to Liberal Learning", Peer Review, 5(4), 4–7.
- Grace, D. J., & Picard, A. (2001). An Experimental Approach to Integrating Mathematics and Literacy Methods Courses. Action in Teacher Education, 23(1), 29–36.
- Graff, G. (1991, February 13). Colleges are Depriving Students of a Connected View of Scholarship. The Chronicle of Higher Education, p. 48.
- Hecke, G. R. V., Karukstis, K. K., Haskell, R. C., McFadden, C. S., & Wettack, F. S. (2002). An Integration of Chemistry, Biology, and Physics: The Interdisciplinary Laboratory. Journal of Chemical Education, 79(7), 837–844.
- Huber, M. T., & Hutchings, P. (2004). Integrative Learning: Mapping the Terrain. The academy in Transition. Washington, DC.: Association of American Colleges and Universities
- Huber, M. T., Hutchings, P., & Gale, R. (2005). Integrative Learning for Liberal Education. peerReview, Summer / Fall.
- Jacobs, S. K., Rosenfeld, P., & Haber, J. (2003). Information Literacy as the Foundation for Evidence-Based Practice in Graduate Nursing Education: A Curriculum-Integrated Approach. Journal of Professional Nursing, 19(5), 320–328.
- Jennings, T. E. (1997). Restructuring for integrative education: multiple perspectives, multiple contexts. Westport, Conn: Bergin & Garvey.
- Jory, B. (Ed.). (2001). Campbell Monograph Series on Education and Human Sciences (Vol. 2).
- Jonas, Harry S., Sylia I. Etzel and Barbara Barzansky. Undergraduate Medical Education. JAMA, Aug. 25 1989. 262(8): 1018–1019.
- Kain, D. L. (1993). Cabbages--And Kings: Research Directions in Integrated /Interdisciplinary Curriculum. Journal of Educational Thought/Revue de la Pensée Éducative, 27(3), 312–331.
- Kirtland, J., & Hoh, P. S. (2002). Integrating Mathematics and Composition Instruction. Primus, 12(1).
- Klein, J. T. (1996). Crossing boundaries: knowledge, disciplinarities, and interdisciplinarities: University Press of Virginia.
- Klein, J. T. (1999). Mapping interdisciplinary studies. Washington, DC. : Association of American Colleges and Universities.
- Klein, J. T. (2005). Humanities, Culture, and Interdisciplinarity: The Changing American Academy: State University of New York Press.
- Kline, Peter (1988).The Everyday Genius Development of Integrative Learning
- Lorents, A., Morgan, J., & Tallman, G. (2003). The Impact of Course Integration on Student Grades. Journal of Education for Business, 78(3), 135-138
- Matthews, M. W., & Rainer, J. D. (2001). The Quandaries of Teachers and Teacher Educators in Integrating Literacy and Mathematics. Language Arts, 78(4), 357–364.
- Perez de Tagle, J. (2008) Leader As Surfer: A Transformational OD Primer for CEOs and Change Agents.
- Roberts, J. A. (2004). Riding the Momentum: Interdisciplinary Research Centers to Interdisciplinary Graduate Programs. Paper presented at the July 2004 Merrill conference.
- Roberts, J. A., & Barnhill, R. E. (2001, Oct 10–13). Engineering Togetherness (An Incentive System for Interdisciplinary Research). Paper presented at the 2001 IEEE/ASEE Frontiers in Education Conference, Reno, NV.
- Scott, D. K. (2002). General Education for an Integrative Age. Higher Education Policy, 15(1), 7–18.
- Shapiro, D. F. (2003). Facilitating Holistic Curriculum Development. Assessment & Evaluation in Higher Education, 28(4), 423–434.
- Shore, M. A., & Shore, J. B. (2003). An Integrative Curriculum Approach to Developmental Mathematics and the Health Professions Using Problem Based Learning. Mathematics and Computer Education, 37(1), 29–38.
- Stefanou, C. R., & Salisbury-Glennon, J. D. (2002). Developing Motivation and Cognitive Learning Strategies through an Undergraduate Learning Community. Learning Environments Research, 5(1), 77-97
- Venville, G. J., Wallace, J., Rennie, L. J., & Malone, J. A. (2002). Curriculum Integration: Eroding the High Ground of Science as a School Subject? Studies in Science Education, 37, 43–83.
- Viswat, L. J., Duppenthaler, C. E., Nishi, K., & Podziewski, K. (2003). A Pilot Study on a Coordinated Approach to Language Instruction. Bulletin of the Educational Research Institute, 21, 79–92.
- Walker, D. (1996). Integrative Education. Eugene OR: ERIC Clearinghouse on Educational Management.
