= The Hillside Singers =

American folk music group (1971)

The Hillside Singers were an American folk pop group. The ensemble was created by advertising agency McCann Erickson to sing in a television commercial. McCann Erickson had written the jingle "I'd Like To Buy the World a Coke" for Coca-Cola, and had sought to have the New Seekers sing it, but that group could not fit the project into their schedule and turned it down. McCann Erickson then got in touch with producer Al Ham, who put together a group of singers for the project (including his wife, Mary Mayo, and their daughter Lorri). The commercial began airing in July 1971 and was extremely popular, convincing Ham to rewrite the song as "I'd Like to Teach the World to Sing (In Perfect Harmony)" and to record an album and a Christmas record. The single hit No. 13 on the Billboard Hot 100 chart, No. 5 on the Adult Contemporary chart, and No. 58 in Canada, which convinced The New Seekers to issue it as a single as well. The Hillside Singers version of the song sold a million copies, earning a gold certification from the Recording Industry Association of America.

The Hillside Singers also sang the vocal version of "Move Closer to Your World", a theme created for television news by Ham, which is known for its long-time use by WPVI-TV in Philadelphia.

In 1972, they had a minor hit with "We're Together", which peaked at No. 100 on the Billboard Hot 100 in February 1972. In Canada the song reached No. 69.

Ham went on to create a syndicated radio music format called Music of Your Life, but he died in 2001. Lorri Ham (now known as Lorri Hafer) continued to work as a professional singer and an on-air personality on the Music of Your Life network.

In 2009 several former Hillside Singers under the name Treehouse 10 released Bug in a Puddle, an album of original children's songs.

Ronald Bruce "Ron" Shaw and Richard Randall "Rick" Shaw were twin brothers born on February 1, 1941, in West Stewartstown, New Hampshire. Ron Shaw died on April 1, 2018, at age 77. Rick Shaw died on January 28, 2021, at age 79.

== Members ==
- Lorri Marsters Ham
- Joelle McDermott [Marino]
- Billy Marino
- Frank Marino
- Laura Marino
- Mary Mayo
- Rick Shaw (vocals, string guitar)
- Ron Shaw (vocals, guitar, banjo)
- Susan Wiedenmann

== Discography ==
- I'd Like to Teach the World to Sing (Metromedia Records KMD 1051, 1971) US No. 71
- Merry Christmas from the Hillside Singers (Metromedia Records KMD 1058, 1972)
