= Steve Arnold (venture capitalist) =

American venture capitalist

Steve Arnold is a Co-Founder and Partner Emeritus of Polaris Partners, a venture capital firm active in the field of healthcare and biotechnology companies.

== Education ==
Steve holds a BS with honors from Macalester College and an MA and PhD from the California Institute of Integral Studies (CIIS) in San Francisco.

== Career ==
Steve represents Polaris on the boards of directors of Mazlo and is a board observer at Impinj. Steve is also co-founder and vice chairman of the board of directors of the George Lucas Educational Foundation, a publisher of stories about models that improve education at www.edutopia.org. He also serves on the boards of a number of non-profit organizations focused on improving K-12 education, including CASEL (the Collaborative for Academic, Social and Emotional Learning), founded by Daniel Goleman and focused on increasing social and emotional learning in schools; Engaged Learning, developing personalized adaptive learning systems for schools; The Teaching Channel, developing online video programming to support teachers’ professional development; and the New Mexico School for the Arts, a statewide public charter high school for students with passion and aptitude for the arts.

Prior to co-founding Polaris, Steve held a number of executive positions in the software and digital media industry. He joined Atari in the late 1970s to develop "blue sky" projects at a skunkworks lab inside the home computer division of the company. In the early 80's he moved to Lucasfilm Ltd. to lead the recently formed "Games Group" to produce advanced video games and interactive entertainment. Over the next 9 years he built what became LucasArts Entertainment, a successful division of Lucasfilm - and the only part of the famous Computer Division that was not closed or spun off in the 1980s (i.e. the editing and sound projects were spun out as The Droid Works; the graphics project was spun out as Pixar).

During that time Lucasfilm Games pioneered several innovations in computer games and interactive entertainment, including the first animated multiplayer online game, called Lucasfilm’s Habitat, in partnership with the predecessor to AOL. This technology was considered by many to be the forerunner of today’s modern multiplayer graphical adventure games, and the first animated adventure game featuring multiple storylines based on which characters the game player chose to adopt. While at Lucasfilm he also led a group that developed innovative uses of multimedia technology for education, collaborating with Apple Computer, the Smithsonian Institution, and the Audubon Society.

Steve left Lucasfilm in the early 90s when he was recruited by Bill Gates to run a private company developing digital media libraries and navigable information systems. That company was first called Interactive Home Systems, and then Continuum Productions. After a few years, parts of that company were purchased by Microsoft, where Steve joined as the vice president of Broadband Media Applications. There, he and his team focused on building applications for emerging broadband networks. He left Microsoft in 1995 and co-founded Polaris Partners with Jon Flint and Terry McGuire in 1996.

== Philanthropy ==
Steve is co-founder and vice chairman of the board of directors of the George Lucas Educational Foundation (GLEF), an operating foundation that promotes innovation and advocates for exemplary programs in public schools. GLEF publishes stories of innovative teaching and learning at www.edutopia.org.

He is also on the Board of Directors of the Teaching Channel.
