= Stephen Arnold (composer) =

American music composer

- Born: Indiana, United States
- Genres: Sonic Branding
- Occupation(s): Musician, songwriter, producer, sonic branding
- Instrument(s): Guitar, piano, bass
- Years active: 1970s - present
- Labels: Stephen Arnold Music
- Website: www.stephenarnoldmusic.com

Stephen Arnold is a songwriter, musician, composer and producer who specializes in sonic branding, often referred to as "the least known, most heard composer in America." His company, Stephen Arnold Music, was formed in 1993.

== Early life ==
Stephen Arnold was born in Indiana in the early 1950s. Arnold discovered a passion for music at an early age while strumming his guitar in a junior high cover band. He and his family then moved to Dallas, where he graduated from St. Mark's School of Texas. Looking for success as a rock and roll guitarist, Arnold left suburban Dallas in 1974 and went west. After a stint in Las Vegas as a singing waiter and a gigging musician, Arnold, at the age of 22, arrived in Los Angeles.

== Career ==
With ambitions of becoming a rock star in L.A., Arnold worked for free at the United Western Studios and acquired the skills needed for music production.

"I was setting up mics and stuff like that, but I was getting to watch people like Neil Diamond and the Beach Boys record. But eventually I had to start paying the bills."

With the financial hardships of a struggling musician behind him, Arnold's first paying job as a musician was producing the theme song for his parents’ arts-and-crafts store. Within a year, he'd composed commercial compositions for Valley View Shopping Center, Friendly Chevrolet, Ebby Halliday and many others.

At around $750 to $1000 per jingle, Arnold figures he couldn't have brought in more than $30,000 in revenue.

Today, Arnold is president of his own company, Stephen Arnold Music, and is known for creating sonic brands for major TV networks including ABC News, CNN Headline News, Sinclair Broadcast Group, The Weather Channel, and more than 380 local stations. The company is trademarked as “The World Leader in Sonic Branding.”

Confirmation of Stephen Arnold's standing in the sonic branding world was confirmed when he was awarded an Emmy for his compositions for Comcast in 2003. He is also a winner of multiple PromaxBDA Awards, which honor excellence in local media, marketing and design.

Stephen Arnold is most known for his sonic branding, and offers seminars explaining the psychology behind music and how it triggers emotional responses from audiences of TV shows, video games, streaming Web content, mobile apps and other visual media. Famous melodies from TV shows such as Friends and I Love Lucy are studied to show how each of the melodies works to establish a strong connection with its audience.

He is also the author of “A Story of Six Strings,” a book featuring the photography of Chris Fritchie that shares his large collection of guitars and the story behind each instrument. The book received critical praise from Steve Miller, Dan Rather and other well-known personalities.

== See also ==
- Notable alumni of St. Mark's School of Texas
