= Television news music =

Music used and made for newscast

Television news music is used by television stations to brand their news operations. Each television station uses an identifiable news theme; some themes are used by multiple stations while others are composed specifically for a certain station.

== In the United States ==
In the United States, news themes used on local television stations are typically organized into news music packages, with each theme within a package sharing a similar musical signature. A typical television news music package consists of anywhere from 50 to as many as 1000 cuts of music. One of the largest news music packages is Overture, created by Stephen Arnold Music. This package consists of a total of 36 themes and over 1000 cuts.

News music packages consist of the following: opens, closes, bumpers, topicals (promo beds), franchise opens/stingers, IDs, utility tracks, and billboards.

- Opens: These are the cuts used to begin a newscast, usually accompanied by a vamp straight out of the open (either a stripped or full version of the bumper). In a news package, opens come in short credit forms (for the main open) and long credit forms (for talent opens). Some packages even include different lengths of the talent opens for three- or four-anchor lineups.
- Closes: Closes also come in different formats and lengths, many of which are similar in sound to that package's open. Usually, there are 60-, 30-, 20-, 15-, and 10-second versions of the close, designed to resolve at a precise time.
- Bumpers: These are used primarily before the main open and teasing out to the next segment of a newscast. When the bumper is played, a summary of what will air in the upcoming newscast or later in the newscast will be shown.
- Topicals/promo beds: These are the cuts of music used only in promos for a specific upcoming newscast. Topicals come in four types: theme donut/theme donut open beds, ID/promo beds, end theme news open/promo beds, and ID/stingers. These usually correspond with regular promo times (30, 20, 10, or 5 seconds).
- Franchise opens/stingers: Franchise opens or stingers are used to open various segments of a newscast in-show, such as breaking news, special reports, sports, weather, or investigation.
- IDs: This is a short package signature used to identify the television station. It can also be used in conjunction to identify talent. The Federal Communications Commission requires several over-the-air (OTA) stations (including radio stations) to identify themselves at regular intervals by either stating their call letters or brand name (sometimes known, particularly in the United States, as a "sounder" or "stinger", more generally as a station or network ident). Also, an ID can signify a network affiliation such as the NBC chimes or the drum rolling intro to the 20th Century Studios fanfare.
- Utility tracks
- Billboards

Stations within the same market area will always use different music packages, unless they are related to each other in some manner; this could be the case if two stations are owned by the same company or operated by the same company under a local marketing agreement (LMA), or one station contracts out its news production to the other. For example, in Fort Myers, Florida, ABC affiliate WZVN-TV is owned by Montclair Communications, Inc., while NBC affiliate WBBH-TV in the same market is owned by Hearst Television, which operates WZVN under an LMA. That said, both stations currently use Hearst's current news theme, Strive by In The Groove Music.

A case where the opposite of the aforementioned is true is in Denver, Colorado, where Fox affiliate KDVR (uses This Is The Place) and CW owned and operated station KWGN (uses Locals Only) are owned by Nexstar Media Group.

=== Custom news music packages ===
==== Single station ====
Some news music packages are custom made for one station only, as opposed to syndicated packages which are used by multiple stations. While syndicated packages are normal in the industry, there are some stations that still use custom-made packages. Such examples include:

- KCNC-TV, Denver, Colorado
  - Image IV by Newsmusic Central (1983–1985)
  - Image V by Newsmusic Central (1985–1986)
  - Image VI by Newsmusic Central (1986–1987)
  - Climb (formerly Image VII) by Newsmusic Central (1987–1993)
  - Altitude (formerly Image IX) by Newsmusic Central (1993–1995)
  - Rise (formerly Image X) by Newsmusic Central (1995–1997)
  - Spirit News by Newsmusic Central (1997–2001)
  - Xtreme News by Newsmusic Central (2001–2003)
- KDVR, Denver, Colorado
  - Questions Answered by Alan Koshiyama (2011–2017)
- KWGN, Denver, Colorado
  - KWGN News Package by Eddie Horst Music (1997–2000)
  - Colorado's Own by Alan Koshiyama (2011–2016)
- WLS-TV, Chicago, Illinois
  - News Series 2000 Plus by Gari Media Group (1992–2013)
  - Stimulus by Gari Media Group (2013–present)
- KFOR-TV, Oklahoma City, Oklahoma
  - KFOR Custom News Package by Newsmusic Central (1993–1997)
  - KFOR-TV News Package by Wow and Flutter Music (1997–2017)
- KNBC-TV, Los Angeles, California
  - Newscenter (1979–1982) and Newscenter II (1985–1993) by Michael Randall
  - KNBC News Package by Tuesday Productions (1982–1985)
  - KNBC News by Michael Boyd (1994–1998)
  - L.A. Groove by Groove Worx (2004–present)
- WJXT, Jacksonville, Florida (these packages used the "WJXT News Theme" Signature in the music exclusive to Florida)
  - The One and Only Channel 4 by Gari Media Group (1992–1997)
  - Image News by Gari Media Group (1997–2002; with WJXT's Alternate Signature)
  - The One and Only by Gari Media Group (2002–2009; with WJXT's Alternate Signature)
  - Newschannel NG/The Edge by Gari Media Group (2009–2019; with WJXT's Alternate Signature)
- KSTP-TV, Minneapolis-St. Paul, Minnesota
  - Leading Edge by Latitude Music (1995–1999)
  - Overture by Stephen Arnold Music (1999–2005)
- KCAL, Los Angeles, California
  - Decade 90 by 615 Music (1990–1994)
  - Faren-Hite by 615 Music (1995–1997)
  - The Hammer by 615 Music (1997–2003)
  - Newsforce by 615 Music (2003–2010)
  - Image News by Gari Media Group (2010–2023)
- KMOV, St. Louis, Missouri
  - Impact by Gari Media Group (1993–1995)
  - This is Your News by Gari Media Group (1995–2001)
  - The Edge by Gari Media Group (2008–2018)
- KTHV, Little Rock, Arkansas
  - KTHV 1995 News Package (1995–2004)
  - KTHV 2004 News Package (2004–2008)
- KUSA-TV Denver, Colorado
  - KUSA News Package by Third Street Music (1995–2009; while it ceased to be the main theme as of October 2008, it was used for the talent ID until February 2009)
- WPIX, New York City, New York
  - WPIX News by Non-Stop Music (1993–2010 and 2014–2017)
  - WB11 Morning News by Non-Stop Music (2000–2011)
  - WPIX 2010 News Theme (2010–2014)
  - New York's Very Own by 615 Music (2017–2023)
  - WPIX Custom News by Stephen Arnold Music (2022–present, used for the 6:30pm news from 2022–2023 and then for all newscasts after that)
- WGN-TV, Chicago, Illinois
  - WGN 1991 News Theme by Terry Fryer (1991–1993)
  - Chicago's Very Own by John Hegner (1993–1997)
  - WGN News Theme by Non-Stop Music (1997–2007)
  - Chicago's Very Own by 615 Music (2007–present)
- WGNO, New Orleans, Louisiana
  - WGNO 1996 News Theme (1996–2002)
  - WGNO News Music Package by Stephen Arnold Music (2011–2020)
- WLVI-TV, Boston, Massachusetts
  - Newswire by 615 Music (1994–2006)
- WWL-TV, New Orleans, Louisiana
  - The Best Things in My Life by TM Productions (1978–1984)
  - WWL News by Jim Kirk (1984–1989)
  - WWL News by Stephen Arnold Music (1989–2004; version 1 and version 2 were made available to other stations)
  - WWL Custom News Package [The Spirit of Louisiana] by Stephen Arnold Music (2004–2006)
- WTVK, Knoxville, Tennessee (now WVLT-TV)
  - "Pulstar" (1977–1981)
  - "Hello News" (1981–1985)
  - "WTVK 1985 News Theme" (1985–1986)
  - "WTVK 1986 News Theme" (1986–1987)
- KOMO News theme (KOMO-TV, Seattle, Washington; composed and recorded by Dan Dean Productions)
  - "KOMO News Theme 1988"
  - "KOMO News Theme 1990"
  - "KOMO News Theme 1992"
- WAVY-TV, Norfolk, Virginia
  - Newswire by 615 Music (1995–present)
- WTVJ, Miami, Florida
  - Watch Our Team Work (1990–1992)
  - WTVJ Custom Music Package by Metro Music (1992–1997)
- WCAU-TV, Philadelphia, Pennsylvania
  - "NBC10 News Theme" (1997–2000) by Eve Songs
  - "WCAU NBC News Theme" (2000–2008) by Modern Audio Production
- WISH-TV, Indianapolis, Indiana (these packages used the melody from "Back Home Again, in Indiana" in the music exclusive to Indiana)
  - Newsleader, (Newsleader in Indiana) by Stephen Arnold, first use of the melody (1991–1997; also once used by WHBQ-TV, Memphis)
  - WISH-TV News Music Package, (Counterpoint with Indiana) by Stephen Arnold (1997–2004)
  - In-Sync V.4/V.5, (In-Sink with Indiana) by 615 Music (2004–2012; 2018–present)
  - A New WISH by 615 Music (2012–2018)
- WJZ-TV, Baltimore, Maryland
  - Chroma Cues (1987–2017)
- KRON-TV, San Francisco, California
  - KRON Instant Classics by Michael Boyd Music (1995–2001; 2006–2020)
  - Overture by Stephen Arnold Music (2001–2006)
  - KRON Custom News by Stephen Arnold Music (2024–present, with Instant Classics signature)
- WNBC-TV, New York City, New York
  - News 4 New York by Scott Schreer (1980–1990)
  - WNBC News Package by John Hegner Music (1990–1992)
  - We're 4 New York by Edd Kalehoff (1992–1995)
  - NBC Stations by Edd Kalehoff (1995–2003)
  - WNBC News by Rampage Music New York, Inc. (2003–2008)
- WRAL, Raleigh, North Carolina
  - In-Sink by 615 Music (1993–present)
- WSB-TV, Atlanta, Georgia
  - News Leader by VTS Productions (1987–1991)
  - WSB 1991 News Theme (1991–1992)
  - Image VIII by Newsmusic Central (1992–1998)
  - Coverage by 615 Music (2009–2015)
  - Guardian by Stephen Arnold Music (2015–present)
- WAGA-TV, Atlanta, Georgia
  - WAGA Eyewitness News by Eddie Horst Music (1990–1998)
- WITI, Milwaukee, Wisconsin
  - The FAT Package by Shelly Palmer (1990-1998)

==== Networks and affiliates ====
Some packages are custom-made for a specific station group company, or owned and operated stations and affiliates of a specific television network:

- Sinclair stations
  - Sinclair News Music Package by Stephen Arnold (2002–December 2006)
  - Daily News by Gari Communications (December 2006 – 2014)
  - Sinclair News Package by 615 Music (2014–present)
- Fox affiliate and owned-and-operated stations (O&Os)
  - FOX O&O Music Package by VTS Productions (1986–1992)
  - FOX '95 by Stephen Arnold (1995–1997)
  - WSVN 1998 Music Package by Chris Crane (1995–2001)
  - First on Fox by Stephen Arnold Music (1996–2001)
  - Outlaw News by Stephen Arnold Music (1997–2006)
  - FOX 1998 Affiliate News Package by Killer Tracks (1998–2009)
  - The X Package by Gari Communications (1999–present)
  - The X-2 Package by Gari Communications (2000–present), used by WTTG from 2000 to 2006
  - Magnum by 615 Music (1998–2007)
  - Fox Affiliate News Theme by OSI Music (2005–present)
  - Beyond by Stephen Arnold (2017–present)
- Gannett/Tegna stations
  - Gannett News Music Package by Rampage Music (2008–2012)
  - This Is Home by Gari Media Group (2012/2013–2017; now only used on non-Gannett/TEGNA stations)
  - C Clarity by Sixième Son (2017–present)
  - Tegna 2026 News Theme by Made Music Studio (2026)
- Hearst stations
  - "Classical Gas" by Telesound (1974–1978)
  - Hello News by Frank Gari (1978–1986)
  - Image News by Gari Media Group (1995/96 – 2003/04; now used only on non-Hearst stations)
  - Revolution (The B Package) by Gari Media Group (1998/99 – 2003/05; alternate package)
  - Hearst TV News Music Package by Newsmusic Central (2003–2014)
  - Strive by In The Groove Music (2012–present)
- Media General/Nexstar Media Group stations
  - Metropolis by Stephen Arnold (2001–2006)
  - Media General Station Group Package by John D. Keltonic (2006–2013)
  - Canvas by Stephen Arnold (2013–present)
  - Guardian by Stephen Arnold (2016–present)
  - Tegna 2026 News Theme by Made Music Studio (2026–present)
- stations owned by Capital Cities Communications
  - Move Closer to Your World by Al Ham (1972–1988)
- stations owned by Triangle Publications
  - Action News Theme by Tom Sellers (1970–1972)
- CBS O&Os and affiliates
  - WBBM News Theme by Dick Marx (1975–1986)
  - Palmer Music Package by Shelly Palmer (1985–2014; also used on non-CBS affiliated stations)
  - The CBS Enforcer Music Collection by Gari Media Group (1994–2023; now used on other CBS and non-CBS affiliated stations)
  - WBBM News by Non-Stop Music (1997–2000)
  - WCBS News by Non-Stop Music (1997–1998)
  - News in Focus by John Hegner (1997–2006)
  - U-Phonix by Stephen Arnold (2004-2006)
  - CBS Local by Stephen Arnold (2013–present)
- NBC O&Os and affiliates
  - NBC TV-Radio Newspulse by Fred Weinberg Productions (1974–1979)
  - NewsCenter Theme by Michael Randall Music (1979–1982)
  - We're 4 New York by Edd Kalehoff (1992–1998)
  - Newswire by 615 Music (1992–present)
  - Primetime News by Non-Stop Music (1992–2022)
  - NBC Stations by Edd Kalehoff (1995–2011)
  - The NBC Collection by Gari Media Group (1995–present)
  - The Rock by Stephen Arnold (2005–present)
  - The Tower by 615 Music (2000–present)
  - WNBC News by Rampage Music New York, Inc. (2003–2015)
  - L.A. Groove by GrooveWorx (2012–present)
  - NBC O&O Package by Stephen Arnold (2011–present)
- E. W. Scripps stations
  - Scripps TV Station Group Package by Musikvergnuegen (2009–2012)
  - Inergy by Stephen Arnold (2012–2020; now used on non-Scripps stations)
  - Scripps Custom News Package by Stephen Arnold (2019–present)
  - Scripps Newscast by 11One/Music (2025–present, debuted on WFTS)
- Belo Corporation stations
  - Spirit (of Texas) by TM Communications (1984–1990s)
  - American Spirit by John Hegner Music (1994–1997)
  - The Spirit by Stephen Arnold (1996–2000)
  - Custom WFAA-TV News Package by Stephen Arnold (2000–2004)
  - Evolution by Stephen Arnold (2004–2007; now only used on non-Belo stations)
  - Propulsion by 615 Music (2006–2014; now used on non-Belo stations)
- General Electric stations
  - GE TV Stations News Music Package by Lucas/McFaul (1981–1983)
- New World Communications stations
  - Impact by 615 Music (1994–1997; now used on non-New World stations)
  - Prime News by Newsmusic Central (1994–1997)
- ABC O&Os and affiliates
  - News Series 2000 (1983–1992)
  - News Series 2000 Plus (1992–present)
  - Eyewitness News by Gari Music Group (1994–present)
  - News One by 615 Music (1994–2014)
  - ABC News Affiliate Music Package by Score Productions (1998–2002)
  - Pinnacle by Stephen Arnold Music (2002–present)
- Hubbard Broadcasting stations
  - This is the Place by Stephen Arnold Music (2012–present)
  - Icon News by 615 Music (2012–present)
- Cox Media Group stations
  - "Move Closer to Your World" by Al Ham (1972–1978)
  - Guardian by Stephen Arnold (2015–present)
  - Stream by Stephen Arnold (2021–present)
- Meredith Corporation stations
  - "Move Closer to Your World" by Al Ham (1973–1977)
  - "Part of Your Life" by Al Ham (1977–1981)
  - Advantage by Gari Media Group (2002–present)
  - Seize the Day by 615 Music (2002–present)
  - High Velocity by 615 Music (2006–present)
  - The Edge by Gari Media Group (2014–2018)
  - In-Sink V6 by 615 Music (2020–present)
- Paramount Stations Group stations
  - The One and Only by Gari Media Group (1995–1999)
  - Pinnacle by 615 Music (1996–1998)
  - The Paramount by Gari Media Group (1997–2001; now used on non-Paramount stations)
  - News Edge by Stephen Arnold Music (1998–2007)
- Tribune Broadcasting stations
  - Elevation by Stephen Arnold Music (2002–2009)
  - Trust by In The Groove Music (2011–2020)
- Morgan Murphy Media stations
  - Vision by In The Groove Music (2019–present)
- Sunbeam Television stations
  - "WHDH-WSVN 2011 News Theme" by Chris Crane (2011–present, Sunbeam owns only three stations)
- LIN Media/Media General/Nexstar Media Group stations
  - Aerial by Stephen Arnold Music (2011–present)
- Clear Channel/Newport Television stations
  - Extreme by Stephen Arnold Music (2004–2009; now used on non-Clear Channel/Newport stations)
  - Alchemy News by Non-Stop Music (2006–2009)
- Quincy Media stations
  - 360 by Stephen Arnold Music (2007–present)
- The WB affiliates
  - Firepower News by 615 Music (1999–2006)
  - Impact by 615 Music (2000–2006)
- Orion Broadcasting stations
  - "Home Country" by Al Ham (1976–1981)
- Citadel Communications stations
  - "WHBF 2002 News Theme" (2002–2005)
  - Pinnacle by Stephen Arnold Music (2005–2006)
- Nexstar Media Group stations
  - Extreme by Stephen Arnold (2006–present)
  - The Rock by Stephen Arnold (2006–present)
  - News Matrix by Stephen Arnold (2008–present)
  - U-Phonix by Stephen Arnold (2008–present)
  - CBS Local by Stephen Arnold (2013–present)

=== Station imaging packages ===
Some news music packages are accompanied by a station image package, featuring promotional jingles which often share the same musical signature as the parent news music package. Often, imaging packages include jingles for the holiday and elections. Such promotional packages first came to prominence in the United States in the 1970s, and had become widespread by the 1980s, used by many (though not all) television stations. Many memorable packages, such as Hello and Turn to... by Frank Gari, were composed during this era, and some were even used on international and non-English stations.

Station image packages are designed to give a positive branding method for broadcast television stations. Many such packages from the 1970s and 1980s often portrayed stations in a community-oriented light, accompanied by footage of the stations' personalities participating in recreational activities and charity events with regular everyday people. By the 1990s, many stations had adopted a more hard-hitting approach to branding, resulting in a reduced demand for traditional promotion campaigns. However, a few stations which used Gari's Hello campaign briefly re-introduced it in the 2000s as part of their 50th anniversary celebrations. Davenport, Iowa station KWQC-TV, which had used the package into the 2010s, revived it in 2023 to commemorate 75 years on air.

=== News music adopted from other sources ===
Besides standard news music packages, some stations had opted to use the soundtrack from some movies or other popular songs as their main news themes; examples include:

- Cool Hand Luke's "The Tar Sequence" by Lalo Schifrin (later gave rise to News Series 2000 by Frank Gari)
- "Classical Gas" by Mason Williams (later gave rise to an identically named news theme by Telesound)
- "Do You Know the Way to San Jose" used by KNTV in San Jose, California, in the 1980s and early 1990s
- "Gonna Fly Now" (version by Maynard Ferguson) used most famously by Citytv Toronto in the 1970s
- The Happening's "The Fuzz" by Frank De Vol used by Rede Globo, in Brazil, in the Jornal Nacional
- Group W's Eyewitness News format at KYW, KDKA, KPIX, WBZ, and WJZ once used "007 Theme" from the From Russia With Love film soundtrack
- Al Caiola's version of Elmer Bernstein's main theme for The Magnificent Seven
- WGCL-TV in Atlanta, Georgia used a news theme based on Johnny Nash's "I Can See Clearly Now" from 2001 to 2002 as part of its "Clear TV" branding
- "MacArthur Park" by Richard Harris and adapted by Hugo Montenegro was used by Cleveland, Ohio, WJW-TV in the 1970s when they were still a CBS station and they used the "City Camera News" theme
- "Theme from Shaft" by Isaac Hayes used by WMC-TV in the 1970s

== Rest of the world ==
Certain news music packages used in the United States have also been used worldwide. Eyewitness News by Frank Gari has been picked up for use in overseas markets; it has been used by Hong Kong Cable News for its morning newscast, and POP TV in Slovenia for its main newscasts.

== News music in the concert hall ==
The News in Music (Tabloid Lament) (2017) by Thomas Meadowcroft is an orchestral work of TV news music specifically written for the concert hall. Commissioned by the Southwest German Radio Symphony Orchestra, the work positions orchestral news music, stylistically reminiscent of TV news music cues from the 1970s and 1980s, in a live, acoustic setting.

== News music composers and production companies ==
=== Canada ===
- Peak Media

=== United States ===
- 11 One/Music
- Land of ADM
- Flavorlab Score
- John Williams
- Hans Zimmer
- Alan Koshiyama
- Stephen Arnold Music
- FirstCom
- Warner Chappell Production Music
  - Gari Media Group
  - 615 Music
  - Non-Stop Music
- Groove Worx
- Edd Kalehoff Productions
- Remote Control Productions
- Killer Tracks
- Newsmusic Central
- Shelly Palmer Company
- Rick Krizman

=== United Kingdom ===
- David Arnold
- Dave Hewson
- David Lowe

=== The Netherlands ===
- Stephen Emmer

=== The Philippines ===
- Ryan Cayabyab
- Jimmy Antiporda
