= Action News =

American television newscast format

- Also known as: Eyewitness News format
- Genre: News program
- Presented by: (see section)
- Music by: Al Ham (1970–2001); Walter Liss Jr. (1943–2022)
- Country of origin: United States
- Original language: English

Production
- Production locations: Newark, New Jersey, United States
- Camera setup: Multi-camera
- Running time: 1 hour
- Production company: WPVI Philadelphia

Original release
- Network: Syndicated
- Release: April 6, 1970 – present

Action News is a local television newscast format originating in the United States. First conceived in Philadelphia, Pennsylvania, it is characterized by a tight format with strict time limits on set packages, a focus on surrounding suburbs, and a focus on young talent. It was a competitor to the Eyewitness News format.

== History ==
The "Action News" format was conceived in Philadelphia, Pennsylvania, at WFIL-TV (now WPVI-TV) by news director Mel Kampmann in 1970, as a response to the "Eyewitness News" format that was used on rival station KYW-TV. At the time, WFIL-TV was said to be "#4 in a three-station market."

The main difference between Action News and Eyewitness News was that the former was far more tightly formatted. Time limits were placed on packages – for instance, a reporter package could be no longer than 90 seconds. This difference enabled the station to cover more stories than its competitors. Another key difference was the focus on the surrounding Philadelphia suburban areas – a response to the movement of residents from the city to the suburbs. Finally, WPVI placed more emphasis on young talent – while WCAU-TV and KYW-TV used older, well-known news anchors such as Vince Leonard, Tom Snyder, and John Facenda, WPVI had a young Larry Kane as its top anchor. Later, the station would add Jim O'Brien as its main weathercaster.

The format was immediately successful, and after going back and forth with KYW for first place, WPVI took the lead in 1977, which it has held ever since. Capital Cities Communications, which acquired WPVI in 1972 and gave the station its current call sign, took the format to most of its other stations.

One of the major development stations for WPVI's Action News was its Capital Cities sister station, WKBW-TV in Buffalo, New York. Under the leadership of news director Irv Weinstein, who had developed his own similar format under the name Eyewitness News, WKBW developed much of the talent that WPVI would later hire to boost them to #1 in the market; anchor Jim Gardner (replacing Larry Kane when he moved to WABC in New York), weatherman Dave Roberts, and voice-over artist Jeff Kaye are the three highest-profile WPVI personalities to have come from WKBW.

WPIX in New York City, an independent station at the time, picked up the Action News concept (and music) successfully for its 10 p.m. newscast. The newscast won numerous awards, but the station never approached the ratings of longtime leader WNEW-TV (now WNYW).

In 2002 and 2003 (respectively), WFTS-TV in Tampa, Florida and KSHB-TV in Kansas City, Missouri (both owned by the E. W. Scripps Company) became the first stations in the country to identify themselves using Action News as full-time station branding (for both local newscasts and entertainment programming) with no station number.

Today, Action News innovations have been incorporated into newscasts across the country. In 2000, WestNet Wireless launched the first Action News brand online with its web-broadcast style format for the markets of Calgary, Alberta and Santa Barbara, California. WestNet also owns the trademark for Action News in Canada and even owns the domain

Although Action News originated at WPVI, it is Cox Media Group, whose stations in Atlanta and Jacksonville adopted the format, that owns the Action News trademark for broadcasting services.

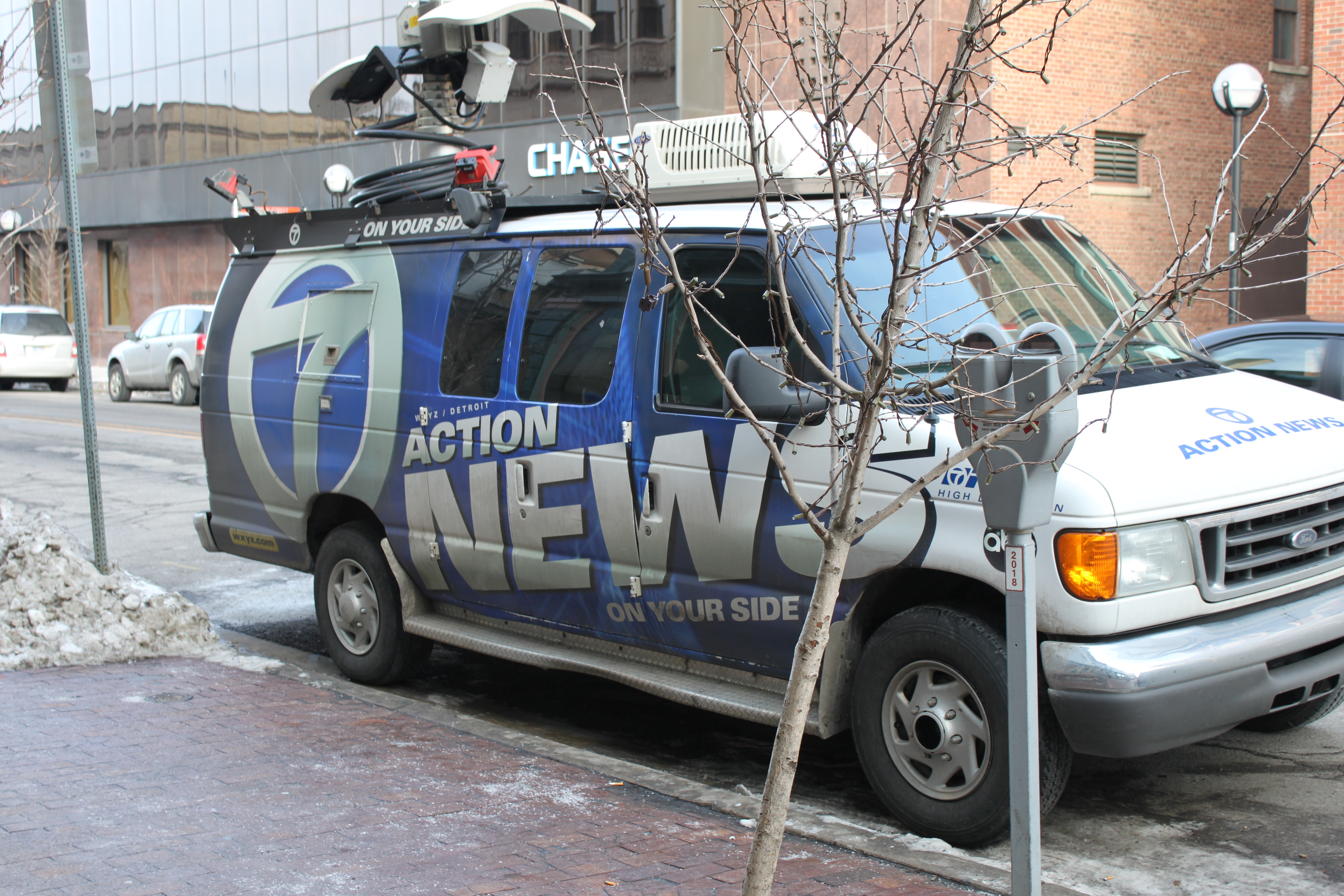
WXYZ-TV Action News remote van

Outside the United States, the Action News title was used by the following television stations:

- Germany's RTL II (then known as RTL2) in the 1990s
- CKCO-TV in Kitchener, Ontario, Canada, in the 1980s and 1990s
- NWS-9 in Adelaide, Australia, in the 1980s
- Netherlands' SBS6 since its inception in 1995 until 2006
- Colombia's Caracol TV (then as a production company for Inravisión) as Noticias de Acción in the 1980s

== Theme ==
When WFIL originally adopted the Action News format in 1970, the program was introduced with the "Action News Theme". The theme was written by Temple University student Tom Sellers, who had briefly been in Daryl Hall's band Gulliver and later formed The Assembled Multitude, and was arranged as a brass-driven rock song. The entire theme was offered through The Philadelphia Inquirer, as a single sided 45 RPM record for about 25¢.

Two years later, the station (under its new call sign WPVI) replaced the "Action News Theme" with Al Ham's "Move Closer to Your World". WPVI continues to use this theme after five decades, even as others have stopped using it. A stereo rearrangement of the theme has been in use since December 1994 (which removed a bongo line). In 1996, the station replaced the original Al Ham theme with a fuller, orchestral version performed by the London Philharmonic Orchestra. Viewer outcry caused the station to drop the new version within five days.

Action News offered the first evening newscasts to be solo-anchored by a woman: Diana Robinson, who was the first African-American female news anchor in American television. She was followed by Jacqui Mullen.

WPVI opens its broadcasts with a rapid montage featuring scenes of Philadelphia-area activities. The scenes are rotated to reflect the current season. For example, spring footage of the Phillies, NASCAR, CART and DIRT starts on March 21, while footage of the Philadelphia Eagles, Philadelphia Flyers, and 76ers starts on September 23, and footage of the Mummers Parade with other winter scenes is shown from December 21 to March 21.

Although "Move Closer to Your World" is strongly associated with the Action News format, many stations that have used the "Action News" name actually chose to use other pieces of music for their newscasts. A handful of stations continued to use Tom Sellers' original theme into the 1980s, with WBNG-TV in Binghamton, New York using the theme for its Action News broadcast as late as 1993. Conversely, stations that use "Move Closer to Your World" do not necessarily use the "Action News" name or format. WNEP-TV in Wilkes-Barre/Scranton, Pennsylvania used the original version of the theme for many years before switching to a modern variation which only partially resembles the original.

== Usage ==
| Market Name(s) | Station(s) | Affiliation(s) | Currently or Formerly Uses | Other Notes |
| New York City | WPIX | The CW | No | Used as an Independent station from 1974 to 1984; station currently brands its newscast as PIX 11 News |
| New York City | WSNL-TV | True Crime | No | Used as an independent station from 1973 until the original iteration of the station went bankrupt in 1975. |
| Los Angeles | KCBS-TV | CBS | No | Used 1988–1996; has identified as CBS LA/CBS News Los Angeles since 2025. |
| Chicago | WBBM-TV | CBS | No | Used for a very brief period from September to October 1971 as TV2 Action News; has identified as CBS News Chicago since 2023. |
| Philadelphia | WPVI-TV | ABC | Yes | Originator of the Action News format on April 6, 1970 |
| Philadelphia | WPHL-TV | The CW | Yes | WPVI-produced broadcasts on WPHL are branded as Action News at Ten on PHL17 |
| San Francisco/Oakland/San Jose | KICU-TV | Independent | No | Newscast defunct, station formerly referred to itself as "Action 36". Currently broadcasts newscast from sister station, KTVU. |
| San Francisco/Oakland/San Jose | KTVU | Fox | No | Used from 1971 to 1978. Newscasts are now branded as KTVU Fox 2 News. |
| Dallas/Fort Worth | KXAS-TV | NBC | No | Used 1979–1984, its years of using Move Closer to Your World; has identified as NBC 5 News since 1999 |
| Atlanta | WSB-TV | ABC (formerly NBC) | Yes | Identified as (Channel 2) Action News since 1974, initially cloning WPVI's format from 1974 to 1977. The station's newscasts still remain very fast-paced, keeping some aspects of the Action News format today. |
| Detroit | WXYZ-TV | ABC | No | Used from 1972 to 2024, now identifies as 7 News Detroit |
| Tampa/St. Petersburg, Florida | WFTS-TV | ABC (formerly Fox) | No | Identified as ABC Action News from 2002 to 2025, now identifies as Tampa Bay 28 News |
| Tampa/St. Petersburg, Florida | WTSP | CBS (formerly ABC) | No | Identified as Action NewsCenter in 1977, then as Action 10 News from 1978 to 1979, and finally as Action News from 1979 to 1989; currently identifies as 10 News; unrelated to WFTS |
| Phoenix, Arizona | KPNX | NBC | No | Used from 1975 to 1986; has identified as 12 News since then. |
| Minneapolis/St. Paul, Minnesota | WCCO-TV | CBS | No | Used during the early 1970s; now identifies as WCCO News and CBS News Minnesota |
| Denver, Colorado | KUSA-TV | NBC (formerly ABC) | No | Used 1976–1984, first as "KBTV Action Center 9 News" from 1976 to 1977, then as 9 News Action Center, has identified as 9 News since 1976, but used "Action" as secondary branding from 1976 until 1984. |
| Miami/Ft. Lauderdale, Florida | WFOR-TV | CBS | No | Used 1989–1995 under the WCIX (channel 6) branding, cloning KCBS-TV's format; has identified as CBS News Miami since 2023 |
| Cleveland, Ohio | WOIO | CBS | No | Has identified as 19 Action News 2002–2015; now identified as 19 News |
| Cleveland, Ohio | WKYC-TV | NBC | No | Known as Action 3 News from October 14, 1974, to March 18, 1984, it utilized the graphics associated with NBC's owned-and-operated stations; has been identified as (Channel) 3 News since 1984; unrelated to WOIO |
| Orlando | WRDQ | Independent | No | Newscast produced by WFTV was rebranded to Eyewitness News. |
| Sacramento/Stockton/Modesto, California | KOVR | CBS (formerly ABC) | No | Used as an ABC affiliate in the 1970s; has identified as CBS 13 News since 2005 |
| Sacramento/Stockton/Modesto, California | KMAX-TV | Independent (formerly UPN, WB and the CW) | No | Used in the 1990s; formerly unrelated to KOVR |
| St. Louis | KTVI | Fox (formerly ABC) | No | Used from 1973 to 1977, cloning WPVI's format; has identified as Fox 2 News since 1996 |
| Pittsburgh | WTAE-TV | ABC | Yes | Used from 1974 to 1989; Brought back again in 1995 as Channel 4 Action News. Currently branded as Action News 4. One of the few that used the name to put emphasis on investigative reporting, with the slogan being "Taking Action For You." Rival station WIIC (now WPXI) cloned WPVI's format. |
| Baltimore | WBAL-TV | NBC (formerly CBS) | No | Identified as Action News 1973–1985, has identified as "11 News" since 1995 and also identified as WBAL-TV 11 News. |
| Charlotte | WSOC-TV | ABC (formerly NBC) | No | Never used the Action News title but used its news format, station calls itself Channel 9 Eyewitness News |
| Charlotte | WAXN-TV | Independent | No | Produced by WSOC-TV; newscasts are now branded as Eyewitness News |
| Charlotte | WCNC-TV (formerly WPCQ-TV) | NBC | No | Used from 1982 to 1984; has identified as WCNC Charlotte News since 2020; unrelated to WAXN/WSOC |
| San Diego | KFMB-TV | CBS | No | Used briefly in the 1970s; title was followed by the current year à la the television game show Match Game and the Airport films (i.e., Action News '75); has identified as CBS 8 News since 2022 |
| Hartford/New Haven, Connecticut | WTNH | ABC | No | Used 1971–1996, same as WPVI's format; has identified as News 8 since 2010; former sister station of WPVI |
| Raleigh/Durham/Fayetteville | WRAL-TV | NBC (formerly CBS and ABC) | No | Used during the 1970s and 1980s; the sister station of Fox affiliate WRAZ. Has identified as WRAL News since 2003. Rival station WTVD cloned WPVI's format. |
| Kansas City | KSHB-TV | NBC (formerly FOX) | No | Identified as NBC Action News (2003–2012), then as 41 Action News in early 2012, has identified as KSHB 41 News since 2021. |
| Kansas City | WDAF-TV | Fox (formerly NBC) | No | Used 1974–1990; has identified as Fox 4 News since 1997; unrelated to KSHB |
| Salt Lake City, Utah | KTVX | ABC | No | Identified as Action News 4 1975–1979; has identified as ABC 4 Utah since 2013 |
| Columbus, Ohio | WSYX (formerly WTVN-TV) | ABC | No | Used as WTVN; has identified as ABC 6 News since 2006 |
| Cincinnati | WLWT | NBC | No | Used from 1973 to 1984, cloning WPVI's format; has identified as News 5 since 2004 |
| Milwaukee | WISN-TV | ABC (formerly CBS) | No | Used from 1976 (when it was still a CBS affiliate) to 1984 for full operation; has identified as (Channel) 12 News since then, with consumer advocacy division known as "Action 12" until the early 2010s |
| Greenville | WYFF (formerly WFBC-TV) | NBC | No | Used 1975–1981; has identified as WYFF News 4 since 1996 |
| West Palm Beach, Florida | WPTV-TV | NBC | No | Used in the 1980s and early 1990s; has identified as NewsChannel 5 since 1993 |
| Birmingham, Alabama | WVTM-TV | NBC | No | Used in the 1970s; currently identified as WVTM 13 News |
| Birmingham, Alabama | WIAT | The CW (formerly CBS) | No | Used in the 1980s and 1990s; currently identifies as WIAT News 42, unrelated to WVTM |
| Harrisburg/York/Lancaster, Pennsylvania | WXBU (formerly WLYH-TV) | Univision (formerly CBS and The CW) | No | Used as a CBS affiliate; newscasts during CW affiliation were produced by WHP-TV |
| Calgary, Alberta/Santa Barbara California | WNET-HD | Independent | Yes | Used since 2000, WestNet Wireless launched the first Action News brand online with its web-broadcast style format for the markets of Calgary, Alberta and Santa Barbara, California WestNet also owns the trademark for Action News in Canada and even owns the domain |
| Las Vegas | KTNV | ABC | No | Used from 2003 to 2023, now known as Channel 13 News |
| Memphis, Tennessee | WMC-TV | NBC | Yes | Has identified as Action News 5 since 1983 |
| Albuquerque/Santa Fe, New Mexico | KOAT-TV | ABC | Yes | Has identified itself as Action 7 News since 1978 |
| Louisville, Kentucky | WHAS-TV | ABC (formerly CBS) | No | Used from the mid-1970s to when it switched from CBS to ABC; has identified as WHAS 11 News since 1991 |
| Jacksonville, Florida | WTLV | NBC (formerly ABC) | No | Used during the mid- and late 1970s; currently identifies as First Coast News, unrelated to WJAX and WFOX |
| Jacksonville, Florida | WJAX-TV | CBS | Yes | Rebranded to title in April 2009 (as WTEV and WAWS). |
| Jacksonville, Florida | WFOX-TV | Fox | Yes | Rebranded to title in April 2009 (as WTEV and WAWS). |
| Providence, Rhode Island/New Bedford, Massachusetts | WLNE-TV | Roar (formerly CBS and ABC) | No | Used during its CBS days; was identified as ABC 6 News from 1995 to 2025 when WLNE's news department was shut down. |
| Austin, Texas | KVUE | ABC | No | Used 1978–1997; has identified as KVUE News since 2001 |
| Scranton/Wilkes Barre, Pennsylvania | WYOU | CBS | No | Used between 1999 and 2001; station ended its newscasts on April 3, 2009; newscasts were resumed in 2012 with Eyewitness News (produced by sister station WBRE) added to WYOU's schedule. Both stations' newscasts were rebranded to "28/22 News" in 2025. |
| Scranton/Wilkes Barre, Pennsylvania | WNEP | ABC | No | Has never been known as Action News, but has used "Move Closer to Your World" theme for several years; currently identifies as Newswatch 16 |
| Fresno/Visalia/Merced, California | KFSN-TV | ABC (formerly CBS) | Yes | Has identified as ABC 30 Action News since 1994, but uses the Eyewitness News format of KABC and KGO; title began on September 14, 1970 |
| Albany, New York | WTEN | ABC (formerly CBS) | No | Used from 1972-1988; has identified as News 10 since 1994 |
| Little Rock, Arkansas | KTHV | CBS | No | Newscast name used before its purchase by Gannett; Currently identifies as Today's THV |
| Mobile, Alabama/Pensacola, Florida | WALA-TV | Fox (formerly NBC) | No | Used from 1989 to 2003; first identified as Action News 10 when it was an NBC affiliate, then identified as Fox 10 Action News when it was a Fox affiliate; currently identifies as Fox 10 News |
| Knoxville, Tennessee | WBIR-TV | NBC | No | Used Action 10 News 1970–1974 and 1978–April 2004; has identified as 10 News since April 2004 |
| Lexington, Kentucky | WLEX-TV | NBC | No | Used in the 1970s, 1980s, and the mid-late 1990s; has identified as LEX 18 News since 2000 |
| Lexington, Kentucky | WTVQ-TV | ABC | No | Identified as Action News 36 2004–2009; later identified as ABC 36 News from 2009 to 2026; station now simulcasts newscasts from local sister station WLEX-TV |
| Huntington/Charleston, West Virginia | WOWK-TV | CBS (formerly ABC) | No | Used from its ABC days and with CBS up to 1993; currently identifies as 13 News |
| Roanoke, Virginia/Lynchburg, Virginia | WSLS-TV | NBC | No | Used during the 1980s. Has identified as 10 News since 2017 |
| Green Bay, Wisconsin | WBAY-TV | ABC (formerly CBS) | Yes | Has identified as Action 2 News since 1987; in 2019, added the sub-branding of Your First Alert Station |
| Honolulu, Hawaii | KHON-TV | Fox (formerly NBC) | No | Used Action 2 News from 1979 to 1982; has identified as KHON 2 News since 2003 |
| Toledo, Ohio | WTVG | ABC | Yes | Identified as 13 Action News until 2006 when it rebranded to 13 ABC Action News; former sister station of WPVI; also known to use the Eyewitness News format |
| Omaha, Nebraska | KMTV-TV | CBS | No | Newscasts were branded as Action 3 News 2006–2017 when it was rebranded 3 News Now. |
| Omaha, Nebraska | WOWT-TV | NBC | No | Known as Channel 6 Action News from the mid-'70s to 1991, then changed to Channel 6 News. Known as WOWT 6 News since 2012. |
| Springfield, Missouri | KYTV | NBC | No | Used from 1974 to 1993, as KY3 Action News; has identified as KY3 News since 1997 |
| Lewiston, Idaho | KLEW-TV | CBS | No | Has identified as KLEW Action News from 2008 to 2012. The station is part of the Spokane, Washington market, but does not serve as the Spokane metro area's CBS affiliate; it is served by KREM-TV. Now identifies as KLEW News |
| Syracuse, New York | WSTM-TV | NBC | No | Used early 1990s to late 2000s; now identifies as NBC 3 News |
| Shreveport, Louisiana | KTBS-TV | ABC | No | Used during the 1980s; Currently identifies as "KTBS 3 News" |
| Huntsville, Alabama | WHNT-TV | CBS | No | Used from 1975 to 1985, currently identifies as WHNT News 19 |
| Madison, Wisconsin | WISC-TV | CBS | No | Used in the 1970s; has identified as News 3 since 1982 |
| Chattanooga, Tennessee | WTVC | ABC | No | Used throughout the 1970s 1980s and early 1990s; has identified as NewsChannel 9 since 1995 |
| Jackson, Mississippi | WAPT-TV | ABC | No | Used during the 1970s; has identified as 16 WAPT News since 1999 |
| Cedar Rapids, Iowa | KGAN | CBS | No | Used as WMT-TV; has identified as CBS 2 News since 2004 |
| Grand Junction, Colorado | KJCT | ABC | No | Identified as Action 8 News in the 1980s. The original KJCT became KGBY. KJCT-LP signed on October 21, 2014, and does a 5:30 p.m. newscast titled KJCT News8. Shares news services with current sister station KKCO |
| Rio Grande Valley, Texas | KGBT | The CW Plus (formerly CBS and Antenna TV/MyNetworkTV) | No | Previously identified as Action 4 News from 2004 to 2015; later identified as CBS 4 News (via simulcast with KVEO-DT2) from 2021 to 2026. |
| Rock Island, Illinois/Davenport, Iowa (Quad Cities) | WHBF-TV | CBS | No | Used during the 1980s; currently identifies as Our Quad Cities News. |
| Savannah, Georgia | WJCL | ABC (formerly NBC) | No | Used 1990s–1997; currently identifies as WJCL News |
| Altoona/Johnstown, Pennsylvania | WTAJ-TV | CBS | No | Used during the 1980s; currently identifies as WTAJ News |
| El Paso, Texas | KDBC-TV | CBS | No | Used in the 1990s; later identified as CBS 4 News from 2013 to 2024; KDBC now simulcasts newscasts from local sister station KFOX-TV and airs ARC El Paso at noon and 10 p.m. |
| Charleston, South Carolina | WCBD-TV | NBC (formerly ABC) | No | Used as an ABC affiliate; has identified as News 2 since 1997 |
| Youngstown, Ohio | WFMJ-TV | NBC | No | Used 1970s–2001; has identified as 21 News since 2001 |
| Florence/Myrtle Beach, South Carolina | WPDE-TV | ABC | No | Used 1986–1993; was identified as WPDE NewsChannel 15 from 1993 until the station's re-branding on April 22, 2015; has identified as ABC 15 News since then |
| Tallahassee, Florida | WTXL-TV | ABC | No | Used in the 1990s; has identified as ABC 27 News since 2006 |
| Lansing, Michigan | WILX-TV | NBC | No | Used during the 1970s and 1980s. Currently identifies as News 10 |
| Augusta, Georgia | WRDW-TV | CBS | No | Used sometime in the mid-1970s; has identified as News 12since 1998 |
| Augusta, Georgia | WAGT | NBC | No | Used 1990s–2003; The original WAGT ceased broadcasting in 2017 due to the Federal Communications Commission (FCC)'s 2017 spectrum incentive auction and NBC programming moved to a new low-powered station on WAGT-CD. News services on WAGT-CD included NBC 26 News and simulcasts of sister station WRDW-TV's News 12. |
| Sioux Falls, South Dakota | KSFY-TV | ABC | No | Identified as KSFY Action News from September 2008 to 2011; currently identifies as Dakota News Now |
| Peoria, Illinois | WMBD-TV | CBS | No | Used from 1974 to 1977; has identified as WMBD News since 2013 |
| Montgomery/Selma, Alabama | WAKA | CBS | Yes | Used in the 1980s, currently identifies as Action 8 News |
| Santa Barbara, California | KEYT-TV | ABC | No | Identified as Action News 1977–1984; has identified as NewsChannel 3 since 2013 |
| San Luis Obispo, California | KSBY | NBC | No | Originally Identified itself as Action 6 News (1970s-early 1980s), 6 Action News (late 1980s-2007) and KSBY 6 Action News (2007–2010) and was a sister station of KSBW, which also uses the Action News format. Currently identifies as KSBY 6 News as of 2010. |
| Lafayette, Louisiana | KATC | ABC | No | Used in the 1980s and 1990s; currently identifies as TV-3 News |
| Salinas/Monterey, California | KSBW | NBC | Yes | Identified as Action News 8 since 1987 |
| Yakima/Pasco-Richland-Kennewick, WA | KIMA-TV / KEPR-TV | CBS | Yes | Identified as Action News from 2007 to 2026; both stations now identify as |
| La Crosse/Eau Claire, Wisconsin | WKBT | CBS | No | Identified as Action 8 News from 1976 to 1987; currently identifies as News 8 |
| Columbus, Georgia | WTVM | ABC | No | Identified as Action 9 News from 1974 to 1992; then identified as THE News Leader; has identified as WTVM News Leader 9 since 1996 |
| Corpus Christi, Texas | KZTV | CBS | Yes | Was identified as Action 10 News since 2004 to 2023; station now airs simulcasts of newscasts from local sister station KRIS-TV. |
| Redding/Red Bluff/Chico, California | KHSL-TV | CBS | Yes | Merged with KNVN to form NCN in 2001 to be later renamed as Action News; has identified as Action News Now since 2013 |
| Redding/Red Bluff/Chico, California | KNVN | NBC | Yes | Merged with KHSL after having lowest ratings out of all three of the area's news stations and to not waste money on a failing station; has identified as Action News Now since 2013 |
| Amarillo, Texas | KAMR-TV | NBC | No | Used in the 1980s; currently identifies as KAMR Local 4 News |
| Rockford, Illinois | WIFR-LD | CBS | No | Used from the 1980s. Has identified as 23 News since 2003 |
| Beaumont/Port Arthur, Texas | KBMT | ABC | No | Used from 1976-1982; has identified as 12 News since 2010 |
| Duluth, Minnesota | WDIO-TV | ABC | No | Used in the 1980s; identified as Eyewitness News from 1988 to 2018; now known as WDIO News |
| Panama City, Florida | WMBB | ABC | No | Identified as Action News 13 from 1976 to 1981; now identifies as WMBB News 13 |
| Erie, Pennsylvania | WJET-TV | ABC | Yes | Currently identifies as JET 24 Action News; was formerly identified as Action News 24 |
| Lawton, Oklahoma/Wichita Falls, Texas | KSWO-TV | ABC | No | Identified as Action 7 News 1979–1996, has identified as 7 News since 1998 |
| Terre Haute, Indiana | WTHI-TV | CBS | No | Started as Action 10 News in 1985 and later became Action 10 News WTHI; has identified as News 10 since 2006. |
| Binghamton, New York | WBNG-TV | CBS | No | The newscast had been called Action News since 1970 (same format as WFIL/WPVI's) until discontinuing the branding in 2016; currently identifies as 12 News |
| Idaho Falls/Pocatello, Idaho | KIDK (formerly KID-TV) | MeTV (formerly CBS and Dabl) | No | Used during the mid-1970s |
| Abilene/Sweetwater, Texas | KTXS-TV | ABC | No | Used during the early 1980s; currently identifies as KTXS News 12 |
| Clarksburg, West Virginia | WDTV | CBS | No | Used in the early 1970s as Action News Central |
| Rapid City, South Dakota | KEVN-LD | Fox (formerly NBC) | No | Used from 1976 to 1995 as KEVN-TV; currently identifies as Black Hills Fox News |
| Alexandria, Louisiana | KLAX-TV | ABC | No | Used from 1996 until full-length newscasts were discontinued in 2001 (news department would be shut down in 2002); newscast was produced by Independent News Network from January 2007 to December 2018; news production shifted to WABG-TV in January 2019 |
| Harrisonburg, Virginia | WHSV-TV | ABC | No | Used 1977–1984; currently identifies as WHSV News 3 |
| Eureka | KVIQ-TV | CBS | No | Used from 1998 to 2002 as Action News 6; later simulcasted newscasts from then-sister station KFTY (now KEMO-TV) in Santa Rosa from 2002 to 2005; now currently simulcasts the 5 p.m., 6 p.m., and 11 p.m. Redwood News from local sister station KIEM-TV |
| Alpena, Michigan | WBKB-TV | CBS | No | Used 1980–2004; currently identifies as WBKB News |
| Buffalo, New York | WKBW-TV | ABC | No | Never used the Action News title but used its news format under the Eyewitness News branding; currently identifies as 7 News |
| Kitchener, Ontario | CKCO-DT | CTV | No | Used in the 1980s and 1990s |
| Joplin, Missouri-Pittsburg, Kansas | KODE-TV | ABC | No | Used the Action News format from 2002 to June 2026, now identified as KODE 12 News |
