= Frank Gari =

American singer-songwriter (born 1944)

- Born: Frank Daniel Garofalo; April 1, 1944 (age 82); New York, U.S.
- Occupations: Singer-songwriter; composer
- Notable work: Various television news music packages

Frank Daniel Garofalo (born April 1, 1944), more prominently known as Frank Gari, is an American singer-songwriter and composer.

== Early life ==
Gari was a popular singer and songwriter from the late 1950s and early 1960s. His best known songs as a performer are "Utopia", "Lullaby of Love", and "Princess", all of which hit the Top 40 in the U.S. Billboard charts in 1961. Contributing to this early acclaim was Gari's unique rich voice blending with carefully selected melodic instrumentation and backup singers, all of which created a deep sense of magic, ethereal perfection, sincerity and emotion. With songwriting partner Roger McGuinn of The Byrds, they wrote the song "Beach Ball" while working with singer Bobby Darin. Gari and McGuinn appeared on Capitol Records billed as The City Surfers. Gari performed his records on shows such as The Merv Griffin Show, The Steve Allen Show, and American Bandstand. He also performed at the "Empire Room" of the Waldorf-Astoria Hotel in New York City with the Woody Herman Band. That year, he moved to Cleveland, becoming a jingle writer for television commercials. Some of his early jingles were for Ohio Bell, Genie garage doors, and early commercials for Wendy's. Gari has won numerous Emmy and Clio awards, and was later honored with the Lifetime Achievement Award from the broadcast industry.

== News music compositions ==
Gari is best known today as a music composer and producer for television, and is also one of the most sought after composers of music for television newscasts in America. His first television theme and image campaign was the popular "Catch 5", originally written for WEWS-TV in Cleveland in 1970.

=== "Hello..." image campaign ===
Gari created and produced the "Hello" image campaign as part of the "Hello News" news theme package, which has been described in Bloomberg as "one of the most popular local television campaigns ever made".

Betraying the exclusivity implicit in the opening lyric of "There's a feeling in the air that you can't get anywhere but (location)...", the campaign was recorded with localized lyrics and imagery in approximately 120 media markets across the United States, Canada, Latin America, and Australia. It debuted in 1977 as "Hello Milwaukee" for WISN-TV.

In 2014, Gari was interviewed about the campaign on This American Life, Episode 520 ("No Place Like Home") after host Ira Glass interviewed a fan of "Hello Calgary". Glass surprised the fan with other markets' variants - dashing his belief that the song had been exclusive to his hometown.

While the lead female vocalist for many renditions was Florence Warner, markets also used local performers including KUTV in Salt Lake City, which aired a version recorded by The Osmonds.

KWQC-TV in Davenport, Iowa is the only station still using the theme, having first adopted it in 1990, and used it until it was dropped for a brief period in 2007, before resuming its usage until 2012. It was later revived in 2023.

=== "Turn To News" image campaign ===
Originally used for Cleveland-based NBC affiliate WKYC when it was first used in 1984, "Turn To News" was quickly picked up by Detroit-based ABC affiliate WXYZ-TV in 1985, briefly nicknamed "Stand Up and Tell Them...", and became an instant hit with medium- and some large-sized markets. It even went its way to Australia through 0-10 Network affiliates TVQ (then known on-air as "TV0") in Brisbane and SAS (now affiliated with Seven Network) in Adelaide.

=== Works for ABC and other US networks ===
He continued composing music for the American Broadcasting Company during the early and mid-1980s, and created such campaigns as "We're With You on ABC", "Now is the Time, ABC is the Place", and "Come On Along with ABC" with Artie Schroeck, as well as "That Special Feeling on ABC", and "You'll Love it on ABC" (which was based on the Randy Newman composition, I Love L.A.). He also composed music for Eyewitness News on ABC such as WABC-TV, ABC's Good Morning America (in 1989), CBS This Morning, The Phil Donahue Show, and The Oprah Winfrey Show.

=== Works for international networks ===
Gari also had international clientele: in 1993, he composed the "Sky Symphony" theme for BSkyB in Europe, and the 1995 "It's On Sky" (also known as "No Turning Back") image piece. The Sky signature from the 1990s was spread to all the Sky channels, including Sky One, Sky Movies, and the defunct Sky Soap and Sky Movies Gold. Sky News used "The Great News Package" as their main theme from 1989 (when they launched their four-channel Astra lineup) until September 1993, and continued to use it (for main news bulletins on Sky News only) alongside the 'Sky Symphony' until 1995. He also composed the early 1990s theme for RTL in Germany called "News Line", which was later adopted by Maryland Public Television in the United States, and in the Philippines it was adapted for the primetime newscast TV Patrol on ABS-CBN. Other international television networks that used Gari's music include STAR News, STAR Plus, STAR World, MBC 1, Pro TV, TVN, Mediacorp Channel 5, Markíza and MTV (Lebanon).

On January 12, 2015, Warner Music Group's Warner/Chappell Production Music unit acquired Gari Communications.

=== Singles ===
- Lil' Girl (October 1959)
- Orange-U-Tang Tango (July 1960)
- Utopia (November 1960)
- Be My Girl (March 1961)
- Lullaby of Love (April 1961)
- Princess (June 1961)
- There's Lots More Where This Came From (March 1962)
- She Make Me Wanna Dance (December 1962)
- Love That's Where It Is (January 1968)
