= Stephen Arnold Music =

American music production company

- Industry: Music production
- Founded: 1993
- Headquarters: Dallas, Texas, USA
- Website: www.stephenarnoldmusic.com

Founded in 1993 by Stephen Arnold, Stephen Arnold Music is a Dallas-based sonic branding agency and full-service music production company, with additional studios in Santa Fe, New Mexico. Stephen Arnold Music has composed original music and sonic brands for hundreds of media outlets, content creators, networks, cable channels, television stations, corporations, production houses, and ad agencies.

Stephen Arnold Music clients include CNN and The Weather Channel.

Their international clients include Al Watan Kuwait, and China Global Television Network.

Stephen Arnold Music was awarded an Emmy for its compositions for Comcast in 2003. The company has also won Promax BDA Awards, which honor excellence in local media, marketing and design.

In 2008, Stephen Arnold Music launched The Vault, a production music library. Music from The Vault has been used by Altitude Sports, Golf Channel, ESPN, Discovery Channel and National Geographic Global Networks.

== See also ==
- Sound trademark
- Television news music
