= List of Grammy Hall of Fame Award recipients (Q–Z) =

The Grammy Hall of Fame is a hall of fame to honor musical recordings of lasting qualitative or historical significance. Inductees are selected annually by a special member committee of eminent and knowledgeable professionals from all branches of the recording arts. It is compiled by The Recording Academy in the United States, and was established in 1973. Recordings (singles and albums) in all genres are eligible for selection, and must be at least 25 years old to be considered. Additions to the list are chosen annually by a committee of recording arts professionals.

This list covers the letter(s) Q–Z.

== List ==
Title	Artist	Record label	Year of release	Genre	Format	Year inducted
Q: Are We Not Men? A: We Are Devo!	Devo	Warner Bros.	1978	New Wave	Album	2020
"Que Sera, Sera (Whatever Will Be, Will Be)"	Doris Day	Columbia	1956	Soundtrack	Single	2012
Rachmaninoff: Piano Concerto No. 2 in C Minor	Sergei Rachmaninoff (on piano) (with the Philadelphia Orchestra conducted by Leopold Stokowski)	Victrola	1929	Classical	Album	1976
Rachmaninoff: Rhapsody on a Theme of Paganini	Sergei Rachmaninoff (on piano) (with the Philadelphia Orchestra conducted by Leopold Stokowski)	RCA Victor	1934	Classical	Album	1979
"Raindrops Keep Fallin' on My Head"	B. J. Thomas	Scepter	1969	Easy listening	Single	2014
Ramones	Ramones	Sire	1976	Punk rock	Album	2007
Randy Newman	Randy Newman	Reprise	1968	Baroque Pop	Album	2016
"Rapper's Delight"	The Sugarhill Gang	Sugar Hill	1979	Old-School Hip-Hop	Single	2014
"Raunchy"	Bill Justis and his Orchestra	Phillips International	1957	Rock & roll	Single	1998
Ravel: Boléro	Lamoureux Orchestra conducted by Maurice Ravel	Brunswick	1930	Classical	Album	1992
Ravel: Daphnis et Chloe	Boston Symphony Orchestra conducted by Charles Munch (featuring New England Conservatory Chorus)	RCA Red Seal	1955	Classical	Album	2008
Ravel: Piano Concerto in G Major	Leonard Bernstein With The Philharmonia Orchestra Of London	Hyperion	1948	Classical	Album	2021
Ray Charles in Person	Ray Charles	Atlantic	1959	R&B	Album	1999
"Reach Out I'll Be There"	Four Tops	Motown	1966	Soul	Single	1998
Reasonable Doubt	Jay-Z	Roc-A-Fella	1996	Hip-Hop	Album	2025
Red Headed Stranger	Willie Nelson	Columbia	1975	Country	Album	2002
Relaxin' with the Miles Davis Quintet	Miles Davis & his Quintet	Prestige	1958	Jazz	Album	2014
"Rescue Me"	Fontella Bass	Chess	1965	Soul	Single	2015
"Respect"	Aretha Franklin	Atlantic	1967	Soul	Single	1998
"Respect Yourself"	The Staple Singers	Stax	1971	Soul	Single	2002
"The Revolution Will Not Be Televised"	Gil Scott-Heron	Flying Dutchman	1971	Funk	Single	2014
Revolver	The Beatles	Capitol	1966	Rock	Album	1999
Rhythm Nation 1814	Janet Jackson	A&M	1989	Pop	Album	2026
"Riders on the Storm"	The Doors	Elektra	1971	Rock	Single	2010
"Ring of Fire"	Johnny Cash	Columbia	1963	Country	Single	1999
The Rise and Fall of Ziggy Stardust and the Spiders from Mars	David Bowie	RCA	1972	Rock	Album	1999
"River Deep - Mountain High"	Ike & Tina Turner	Philles	1966	Soul	Single	1999
"Rock-a-Bye Your Baby with a Dixie Melody"	Al Jolson	Columbia	1918	Musical theatre	Single	2004
"Rock Around the Clock"	Bill Haley & His Comets	Decca	1954	Rock & roll	Single	1982
"Rock Island Line"	Lead Belly	Asch Records	1942	Blues	Single	2016
"Rocket 88"	Jackie Brenston & his Delta Cats	Chess	1951	R&B	Single	1998
"Rockin' Around the Christmas Tree"	Brenda Lee	Decca	1958	Christmas	Single	2019
"Rockin' Chair"	Mildred Bailey	Vocalion	1937	Jazz	Single	2011
"Roll Over Beethoven"	Chuck Berry	Chess	1956	Rock & roll	Single	1990
"Rollin' Stone"	Muddy Waters	Chess	1950	Electric Blues	Single	2000
'Round About Midnight	Miles Davis	Columbia	1957	Jazz	Album	2019
"'Round About Midnight"	Thelonious Monk Quintet	Blue Note	1947	Bebop	Single	1993
"Roxanne"	The Police	A&M	1978	Reggae rock	Single	2008
Rubber Soul	The Beatles	Capitol	1965	Folk Rock	Album	2000
"Rudolph, the Red-Nosed Reindeer"	Gene Autry	Columbia	1949	Country	Single	1985
"Rumble"	Link Wray and his Ray Men	Cadence	1958	Surf Rock	Single	2019
Rumours	Fleetwood Mac	Warner Bros.	1977	Soft Rock	Album	2003
"Runaround Sue"	Dion	Laurie	1961	Rock & roll	Single	2002
"Runaway"	Del Shannon	London	1961	Rock & roll	Single	2002
"San Antonio Rose"	Bob Wills & his Texas Playboys	Vocalion	1939	Western swing	Single	2015
Santana	Santana	Columbia	1969	Latin Rock	Album	2012
Sarah Vaughan with Clifford Brown	Sarah Vaughan and Clifford Brown	EmArcy	1955	Jazz	Album	1999
Saturday Night Fever Original Film Soundtrack	Bee Gees and Various Artists	RSO	1977	Disco	Album	2004
"Save the Last Dance for Me"	The Drifters	Atlantic	1960	R&B	Single	2001
"Savoy Blues"	Louis Armstrong and his Hot Five	Okeh	1927	Jazz	Single	2018
Saxophone Colossus	Sonny Rollins Quartet	Prestige	1957	Hard Bop	Album	1999
Schoenberg: Gurre-Lieder	Philadelphia Orchestra conducted by Leopold Stokowski (with Rose Bampton, Paul Althouse, Jeanette Vreeland, etc.)	Victor	1932	Classical	Album	2007
Schoenberg: The Four String Quartets	Kolisch String Quartet conducted by Arnold Schoenberg	RCA	1937	Classical	Album	2021
"School's Out"	Alice Cooper & his Band	Warner Bros.	1972	Rock	Single	2015
Schubert: Ave Maria	Marian Anderson	RCA Victor	1936	Opera	Single	1999
Schumann: Carnaval Op. 9	Sergei Rachmaninoff	RCA	1929	Classical	Album	2011
"Secret Love"	Doris Day	Columbia	1953	Traditional pop	Single	1999
"See See Rider Blues"	Ma Rainey	Paramount	1924	Blues	Single	2004
"Sentimental Journey"	Les Brown and his Orchestra (featuring vocals sung by Doris Day)	Columbia	1944	Traditional pop	Single	1998
September of My Years	Frank Sinatra	Reprise	1965	Traditional pop	Album	1999
"September Song"	Walter Huston	Brunswick	1938	Traditional pop	Single	1984
"Seven, Come Eleven"	Benny Goodman & his Sextet (featuring Charlie Christian on guitar)	Columbia	1939	Swing	Single	2008
Sgt. Pepper's Lonely Hearts Club Band	The Beatles	Capitol	1967	Rock	Album	1993
"Sh-Boom"	The Chords	Cat Records	1954	Doo-Wop	Single	2008
"Shake, Rattle and Roll"	Big Joe Turner	Atlantic	1954	R&B	Single	1998
The Shape of Jazz to Come	Ornette Coleman	Atlantic	1959	Avant-Garde Jazz	Album	2015
"She Thinks I Still Care"	George Jones	United Artists	1962	Country	Single	1999
"She's About a Mover"	Sir Douglas Quintet	Tribe Records	1965	Garage Rock	Single	2016
"She's Not There"	The Zombies	Decca	1964	British Beat	Single	2016
"Shining Star"	Earth, Wind & Fire	Columbia	1975	Funk	Single	2008
"Shop Around"	The Miracles	Tamla	1960	Soul	Single	2006
Shostakovich: Cello Concerto No. 1 in E-Flat Op. 107	Mstislav Rostropovich with Philadelphia Orchestra conducted by Eugene Ormandy	Columbia Masterworks	1960	Classical	Album	2008
Shostakovich: Symphony No. 5	New York Philharmonic conducted by Leonard Bernstein	Sony Classical	1959	Classical	Album	2007
Shostakovich: Violin Concerto No. 1 in A Minor Op. 99	David Oistrakh with New York Philharmonic conducted by Dimitri Mitropoulos	Sony Classical	1956	Classical	Album	2003
"Shotgun"	Jr. Walker & The All Stars	Soul Records	1965	Soul	Single	2002
"Shout" (Part 1)	The Isley Brothers	RCA	1959	R&B	Single	1999
Show Boat	Cast: Paul Robeson, Helen Morgan, James Melton, Frank Munn, Countess Albani, etc. (with Orchestra & Chorus conducted by Victor Young)	Brunswick	1932	Musical show	Album	1991
The Sidewinder	Lee Morgan	Blue Note	1964	Jazz	Album	2000
Sign o' the Times	Prince	Paisley Park	1987	R&B	Album	2017
"Sincerely"	The Moonglows	Chess	1954	R&B	Single	2002
Sing a Song of Basie	Lambert, Hendricks & Ross	ABC-Paramount	1957	Jazz	Album	1998
"Sing, Sing, Sing (With a Swing)"	Benny Goodman	Victor	1937	Jazz	Single	1982
"Singin' in the Rain (From the Motion Picture Soundtrack)"	Gene Kelly	MGM	1952	Soundtrack	Single	1999
"Singin' the Blues"	Frankie Trumbauer and his Orchestra featuring Bix Beiderbecke on cornet and Eddie Lang on guitar	Okeh	1927	Jazz	Single	1977
"(Sittin' On) The Dock of the Bay"	Otis Redding	Atco	1968	R&B	Single	1998
"Sitting on Top of the World"	Mississippi Sheiks	Okeh	1930	Country blues	Single	2008
"Sixteen Tons"	Tennessee Ernie Ford	Capitol	1955	Country	Single	1998
"Sixty Minute Man"	Billy Ward and his Dominoes	Federal	1951	R&B	Single	2015
Sketches of Spain	Miles Davis and Gil Evans	Columbia	1960	Third stream jazz	Album	1997
"Smells Like Teen Spirit"	Nirvana	DGC	1991	Grunge	Single	2017
"Smoke Gets in Your Eyes"	The Platters	Mercury	1958	Doo-Wop	Single	2019
"Smoke on the Water"	Deep Purple	Purple (UK), Warner Bros. (US)	1973	Hard Rock	Single	2017
"Smokestack Lightning"	Howlin' Wolf	Chess	1956	Blues	Single	1999
Snow White and the Seven Dwarfs Motion Picture Soundtrack	Cast: Adriana Caselotti, Roy Atwell, Pinto Colvig, Billy Gilbert, Otis Harlan, Scotty Mattraw, Harry Stockwell, Eddie Collins, etc.	Victor	1937	Soundtrack	Album	1998
So	Peter Gabriel	Charisma	1986	Pop	Album	2021
"Society's Child (Baby I've Been Thinking)"	Janis Ian	Verve	1966	Pop	Single	2002
"Solitude"	Billie Holiday	Clef	1952	Vocal Jazz	Single	2021
"Some of These Days"	Sophie Tucker	Edison	1911	Traditional pop	Single	1995
"Someone to Watch Over Me"	Gertrude Lawrence	Victor	1926	Jazz	Single	2008
"Somewhere a Voice is Calling"	John McCormack	Victor	1914	Traditional pop	Single	1999
Song for My Father	The Horace Silver Quintet	Blue Note	1965	Jazz	Album	1999
"A Song for You"	Leon Russell	Shelter	1970	Vocal	Single	2018
Songs for Swingin' Lovers!	Frank Sinatra	Capitol	1956	Traditional pop	Album	2000
Songs in the Key of Life	Stevie Wonder	Tamla	1976	Pop	Album	2002
Songs of Leonard Cohen	Leonard Cohen	Columbia	1967	Contemporary Folk	Album	2015
"Sonny Boy"	Al Jolson	Brunswick	1928	Traditional pop	Single	2002
"Soul Man"	Sam & Dave	Stax	1967	Soul	Single	1999
The Sound of Music Motion Picture Soundtrack	Cast: Julie Andrews, Christopher Plummer, Bill Lee, Charmian Carr, Daniel Truhitte, Margery McKay, etc.	RCA	1965	Soundtrack	Album	1998
"The Sounds of Silence"	Simon & Garfunkel	Columbia	1964	Folk Rock	Single	2004
South Pacific Original Broadway Cast Recording	Cast: Ezio Pinza, Mary Martin, Juanita Hall, William Tabbert, Myron McCormick, etc.	Columbia	1949	Musical show	Album	1987
"Space Oddity"	David Bowie	Philips	1969	Rock	Track from Space Oddity	2018
"Spanish Harlem"	Ben E. King	Atco	1960	Soul	Single	2002
"St. Louis Blues"	Bessie Smith featuring Louis Armstrong (cornet) and Fred Longshaw (Harmonium)	Columbia	1925	Blues	Single	1993
"St. Louis Blues"	W. C. Handy and his Orchestra	Okeh	1923	Jazz	Single	2019
"St. Louis Blues"	Louis Armstrong	Okeh	1929	Jazz	Single	2008
St. Louis Woman Original Broadway Cast Recording	Cast: Ruby Hill, Harold Nicholas, Pearl Bailey, Robert Pope, June Hawkins, etc.	Capitol	1946	Musical show	Album	2012
"Stack O' Lee Blues"	Mississippi John Hurt	Okeh	1928	Blues	Single	2017
"Stairway to Heaven"	Led Zeppelin	Atlantic	1971	Rock	Track	2003
Stan Freberg Presents The United States Of America	Stan Freberg	Capitol	1961	Comedy	Album	1999
Stand!	Sly and the Family Stone	Epic	1969	Funk	Album	2015
"Stand by Me"	Ben E. King	Atco	1961	Soul	Single	1998
"Stand by Your Man"	Tammy Wynette	Epic	1968	Country	Single	1999
"Star Dust"	Louis Armstrong	Okeh	1931	Jazz	Single	2009
"Star Dust"	Hoagy Carmichael & his Pals	Gennett	1927	Traditional pop	Single	1995
"Star Dust"	Artie Shaw & his Orchestra (featuring Billy Butterfield on trumpet)	RCA Victor	1940	Jazz	Single	1988
"The Star-Spangled Banner"	Jimi Hendrix	Reprise	1970	Rock	Track	2009
Star Wars Film Soundtrack	London Symphony Orchestra conducted by John Williams	20th Century	1977	Classical	Album	2007
Stardust	Willie Nelson	Columbia	1978	Pop	Album	2015
"The Stars and Stripes Forever"	John Philip Sousa & his Band	Edison	1909	Traditional pop	Single	1998
"Statesboro Blues"	Blind Willie McTell	Victor	1928	Piedmont Blues	Single	2017
"Stealin' Stealin'"	Memphis Jug Band	Victor	1928	Folk	Single	2013
"Steel Guitar Rag"	Bob Wills & his Texas Playboys (featuring Leon McAuliffe)	Vocalion	1936	Western swing	Single	2011
Sticky Fingers	The Rolling Stones	Rolling Stones Records	1971	Hard Rock	Album	1999
Still Crazy After All These Years	Paul Simon	Columbia	1975	Folk Rock	Album	2003
"Stop! In the Name of Love"	The Supremes	Motown	1965	Pop	Single	2001
"Stormy Weather"	Lena Horne	RCA Victor	1941	Traditional pop	Single	2000
"Stormy Weather"	Ethel Waters	Brunswick	1933	Blues	Single	2003
Straight Outta Compton	N.W.A	Ruthless	1988	Gangsta Rap	Album	2017
"Straighten Up and Fly Right"	Nat King Cole & his Trio	Capitol	1943	Jazz	Single	1998
"Strange Fruit"	Billie Holiday	Commodore	1939	Blues	Single	1978
"Strange Things Happening Every Day"	Sister Rosetta Tharpe	Decca	1944	Negro spiritual	Single	2014
The Stranger	Billy Joel	Columbia	1977	Pop Rock	Album	2008
"Strangers in the Night"	Frank Sinatra	Reprise	1966	Traditional pop	Single	2008
Strauss: Also Sprach Zarathustra, Op. 30	Boston Symphony Orchestra conducted by Serge Koussevitzky	RCA Victor	1935	Classical	Album	2008
Strauss: Also Der Rosenkavalier Op. 59, TrV 227 (abridged version)	The Vienna State Opera Chorus & Vienna Philharmonic Orchestra; Lotte Lehmann, Elisabeth Schumann & Richard Mayr conducted by Robert Heger	RCA Victor	1933	Classical	Album	2008
Strauss: Der Rosenkavalier	Philharmonia Orchestra; Elisabeth Schwarzkopf, Christa Ludwig & Teresa Stich-Randall conducted by Herbert von Karajan	Angel	1957	Classical	Album	2008
Stravinsky: Le Sacre du Printemps	Boston Symphony Orchestra conducted by Pierre Monteux	RCA	1951	Classical	Album	1993
Stravinsky: Petrouchka	Orchestre de la Suisse Romande conducted by Ernest Ansermet	Decca	1949	Classical	Album	1999
Stravinsky: Petrouchka: Le Sacre du Printemps	Igor Stravinsky cond. Columbia Symphony Orchestra (plus spoken reminiscing apropos of Le Sacre)	Columbia	1960	Classical	Album	2000
"Strawberry Fields Forever"	The Beatles	Capitol	1967	Psychedelic rock	Single	1999
"Summer in the City"	The Lovin' Spoonful	Kama Sutra	1966	Pop	Single	1999
"Summertime"	Sidney Bechet	Blue Note	1939	Jazz	Single	2011
"Summertime Blues"	Eddie Cochran	Liberty	1958	Rock & roll	Single	1999
Sunday at the Village Vanguard	Bill Evans & his Trio	Riverside	1961	Jazz	Album	2011
Super Fly	Curtis Mayfield	Curtom	1972	Funk	Album	1998
Supernatural	Santana	Arista	1999	Latin rock	Album	2025
"Superstition"	Stevie Wonder	Tamla	1972	Funk	Single	1998
Surrealistic Pillow	Jefferson Airplane	RCA Victor	1967	Rock	Album	1999
"Suspicious Minds"	Elvis Presley	RCA Victor	1969	Soul	Single	1999
"Swanee"	Al Jolson	Columbia	1920	Traditional pop	Single	1998
Sweet Baby James	James Taylor	Warner Bros.	1970	Pop	Album	2002
"Sweet Caroline"	Neil Diamond	Uni	1969	Soft Rock	Single	2020
"Sweet Dreams (Are Made of This)"	Eurythmics	RCA	1983	Synth-pop	Single	2020
"Sweet Home Alabama"	Lynyrd Skynyrd	MCA	1974	Southern rock	Single	2009
"Sweet Home Chicago"	Robert Johnson	Vocalion	1936	Blues	Single	2014
Sweetheart of the Rodeo	The Byrds	Columbia	1968	Country Rock	Album	2000
"Swing Low, Sweet Chariot"	Fisk Jubilee Singers	Victor	1909	Negro spiritual	Single	2015
"Swing Low, Sweet Chariot"	Paul Robeson	His Master's Voice	1926	Gospel	Single	2015
"Swinging on a Star"	Bing Crosby with The Williams Brothers and John Scott Trotter & his Orchestra	Decca	1944	Traditional pop	Single	2002
Switched-On Bach	Wendy Carlos	Columbia Masterworks	1968	Electronic	Album	1999
Synchronicity	The Police	A&M	1983	New Wave	Album	2009
Taj Mahal	Taj Mahal	Columbia	1968	Blues Rock	Album	2020
"Take Five"	The Dave Brubeck Quartet	Columbia	1959	Jazz	Single	1996
"Take Me Home, Country Roads"	John Denver	RCA	1971	Country	Single	1998
"Take Me Out to the Ball Game"	Edward Meeker with the Edison Orchestra	Edison	1908	Tin Pan Alley	Single	2019
"Take the 'A' Train"	Duke Ellington & His Orchestra	Victor	1941	Jazz	Single	1976
"Take Me to the River"	Al Green	Hi	1974	Soul	Track	2011
Talking Book	Stevie Wonder	Tamla	1972	Soul	Album	1999
Tapestry	Carole King	Ode	1971	Pop	Album	1998
"A Taste of Honey"	Herb Alpert & his Tijuana Brass	A&M	1965	Jazz	Single	2008
Tchaikovsky: Concerto No. 1 in B-Flat Minor Op. 23 for piano and orchestra (live performance)	Vladimir Horowitz with NBC Symphony Orchestra conducted by Arturo Toscanini	RCA Victor	1943	Classical	Album	1998
Tchaikovsky: Piano Concerto No. 1 in B-Flat Minor Op. 23	Van Cliburn with RCA Victor Symphony Orchestra conducted by Kirill Kondrashin	RCA Victor	1958	Classical	Album	2002
Tchaikovsky: 1812 Overture/Capriccio Italien	Minneapolis Symphony Orchestra conducted by Antal Doráti	Mercury	1954	Classical	Album	1998
Tea for the Tillerman	Cat Stevens	Island/A&M	1970	Folk rock	Album	2025
"Tea for Two"	Art Tatum, Piano Solo	Decca	1939	Jazz	Single	1986
"Teach Me Tonight"	Dinah Washington	Mercury	1954	Traditional pop	Single	1999
"The Tears of a Clown"	Smokey Robinson & the Miracles	Tamla	1967	Pop	Single	2002
"Tell It Like It Is"	Aaron Neville	Par-Lo Records	1966	R&B	Single	2015
Ten	Pearl Jam	Epic	1991	Alternative Rock	Album	2021
"Ten Cents a Dance"	Ruth Etting	Columbia	1930	Musical theatre	Single	1999
"Tenderly"	Sarah Vaughan	Mercury	1947	Jazz	Single	2019
"Tennessee Waltz"	Patti Page	Mercury	1950	Traditional pop	Single	1998
"Tenor Madness"	Sonny Rollins Quartet featuring John Coltrane	Prestige	1956	Jazz	Single	2019
"Tequila"	The Champs	Challenge	1958	Rock & roll	Single	2001
Texas Flood	Stevie Ray Vaughan and Double Trouble	Epic	1983	Blues	Album	2021
"Thank You (Falettinme Be Mice Elf Agin)"	Sly & The Family Stone	Epic	1969	Funk	Single	2017
"Thanks for the Memory"	Bob Hope and Shirley Ross	Decca	1938	Soundtrack	Single	2005
"That'll Be the Day"	The Crickets	Brunswick	1957	Rock & roll	Single	1998
"That's All Right"	Arthur Crudup	RCA Victor	1947	Blues	Single	2018
"That's All Right"	Elvis Presley	Sun Records	1954	Rockabilly	Single	1998
"That's My Desire"	Frankie Laine with Mannie Klein & his All-Stars	Mercury	1946	Traditional pop	Single	1998
That's the Way of the World	Earth, Wind & Fire	Columbia	1975	Soul	Album	2004
Thelonious Monk with John Coltrane	Thelonious Monk and John Coltrane	Jazzland	1961	Jazz	Album	2007
"Theme from A Summer Place"	Percy Faith and his Orchestra	Columbia	1959	Easy listening	Single	2000
"Theme from New York, New York"	Frank Sinatra	Reprise	1980	Jazz	Single	2013
"Theme from Shaft"	Isaac Hayes	Stax	1971	Funk	Single	1999
"There Goes My Baby"	The Drifters	Atlantic	1959	R&B	Single	1998
There's a Riot Goin' On	Sly and the Family Stone	Epic	1971	Funk	Album	1999
"These Boots Are Made for Walkin'"	Nancy Sinatra	Reprise	1965	Pop	Single	2020
"They Can't Take That Away from Me"	Fred Astaire with Johnny Green & his Orchestra	Paramount Pictures	1937	Soundtrack	Single	2005
"(They Long to Be) Close to You"	The Carpenters	A&M	1970	Pop	Single	2000
"The Third Man Theme"	Anton Karas	London	1949	Soundtrack	Single	2006
"This Land Is Your Land"	Woody Guthrie	Asch Records	1945	Folk	Single	1989
"This Train"	Sister Rosetta Tharpe	Decca	1939	Gospel	Single	2016
"The Thrill Is Gone"	B.B. King	BluesWay	1969	Blues	Single	1998
Thriller	Michael Jackson	Epic	1982	Pop	Album	2008
"Till the End of Time"	Perry Como with Russ Case and his Orchestra	RCA Victor	1945	Traditional pop	Single	1998
"Time Is on My Side"	Irma Thomas	Imperial Records	1964	R&B	Single	2021
Time Out	Dave Brubeck Quartet	Columbia	1959	Cool Jazz	Album	2009
"The Times They Are a-Changing"	Bob Dylan	Columbia	1964	Folk	Track	2013
"Tiny Dancer"	Elton John	Uni	1972	Rock	Single	2020
"Tipitina"	Professor Longhair And His Blues Scholars	Atlantic	1953	Blues	Single	1998
"The Titanic"	Ernest Stoneman	Okeh	1924	Country	Single	2013
"To Be Young, Gifted and Black"	Nina Simone	RCA Victor	1969	Soul	Single	2019
"Tom Dooley"	The Kingston Trio	Capitol	1958	Folk	Single	1998
Tommy	The Who	Decca	1969	Rock	Album	1998
"Top Hat, White Tie and Tails"	Fred Astaire	Brunswick	1935	Soundtrack	Single	2008
"The Tracks of My Tears"	The Miracles	Tamla	1965	Soul	Single	2007
Trio	Dolly Parton, Linda Ronstadt and Emmylou Harris	Warner Bros.	1987	Country	Album	2021
"Trouble in Mind"	Bertha "Chippie" Hill	Okeh	1926	Blues	Single	2026
Trumpet Blues (And Cantabile)	Harry James and his Orchestra	Columbia	1942	Jazz	Album	1999
"Try a Little Tenderness"	Otis Redding	Atco	1966	Soul	Single	2015
Tubular Bells	Mike Oldfield	Virgin	1973	Progressive rock	Album	2018
"Tumbling Tumbleweeds"	Sons of the Pioneers	Decca	1934	Country	Single	2002
"Turn On Your Love Light"	Bobby "Blue" Bland	Duke	1961	R&B	Single	1999
"Turn! Turn! Turn! (To Everything There Is A Season)"	The Byrds	Columbia	1965	Folk Rock	Single	2001
"Tutti Frutti"	Little Richard	Specialty	1955	Rock & roll	Single	1998
"The Twist"	Chubby Checker	Parkway	1960	Rock & roll	Single	2000
"Twist and Shout"	The Isley Brothers	Wand	1962	Rock & roll	Single	2010
2000 and Thirteen	Carl Reiner & Mel Brooks	Warner Bros.	1973	Comedy	Album	1999
"Un Poco Loco"	Bud Powell	Blue Note	1951	Jazz	Single	1999
"Unchained Melody"	The Righteous Brothers	Verve	1965	Blue-eyed Soul	Single	2000
"Uncloudy Day"	The Staple Singers	Vee-Jay	1956	Gospel	Single	1999
"Under the Boardwalk"	The Drifters	Atlantic	1964	Pop	Single	2014
"Unforgettable"	Nat "King" Cole	Capitol	1951	Traditional pop	Single	2000
"Unforgettable"	Dinah Washington	Mercury	1959	Pop	Single	2001
"Up Up and Away"	The 5th Dimension	Soul City	1967	Pop	Single	2003
"Vaya Con Dios"	Les Paul and Mary Ford	Capitol	1953	Pop	Single	2005
The Velvet Underground & Nico	The Velvet Underground and Nico	Verve	1967	Art Rock	Album	2008
Verdi: Celeste Aida	Enrico Caruso	Victor	1908	Opera	Single	1993
Verdi: Otello	Cast: Ramón Vinay, Herva Nelli, Giuseppe Valdengo, etc. (with NBC Symphony Orchestra conducted by Arturo Toscanini)	RCA Victor	1947	Opera	Album	2008
"The Very Thought of You"	Ray Noble & his Orchestra (featuring vocals sung by Al Bowlly)	Victor	1934	Traditional pop	Single	2005
Villa-Lobos: "Bachianas Brasileiras" No. 5 – Aria	Bidu Sayão (with a Cello Ensemble conducted by Heitor Villa-Lobos)	Columbia Masterworks	1945	Classical	Single	1984
Vivaldi: The Four Seasons	Louis Kaufman (Violinist)	Concert Hall	1947	Classical	Album	2002
"Wabash Cannonball"	Roy Acuff & His Smokey Mountain Boys	Columbia	1947	Country	Single	1998
Wagner: Der Ring des Nibelungen	Vienna Philharmonic conducted by Georg Solti	London	1958–67	Classical	Album	1998
Wagner: Tristan und Isolde (Complete)	Cast: Ludwig Suthaus, Kirsten Flagstad, Elisabeth Schwarzkopf, etc. (with Royal Opera House Covent Garden Chorus & Philharmonia Orchestra conducted by Wilhelm Furtwängler)	RCA Victor	1952	Opera	Album	1988
"Wake Up Little Susie"	The Everly Brothers	Cadence	1957	Country Rock	Single	2017
"Walk, Don't Run"	The Ventures	Dolton	1960	Rock	Single	2006
"Walk On By"	Dionne Warwick	Scepter	1964	Pop	Single	1998
"Walk on the Wild Side"	Lou Reed	RCA	1972	Glam Rock	Single	2015
"Walk Right In"	Cannon's Jug Stompers	Victor	1929	Country blues	Single	2007
"Walk This Way"	Aerosmith	Columbia	1975	Rock	Single	2019
"Walk This Way"	Run-D.M.C. featuring Aerosmith	Profile	1986	Rap Rock	Single	2014
"Walkin' After Midnight"	Patsy Cline	Decca	1957	Country	Single	2020
"Walking the Dog"	Rufus Thomas	Stax	1963	R&B	Single	2002
"Walking the Floor Over You"	Ernest Tubb	Decca	1941	Country	Single	1998
"Walking to New Orleans"	Fats Domino	Imperial Records	1960	R&B	Single	2011
The Wall	Pink Floyd	Harvest	1979	Progressive rock	Album	2008
"The Wallflower" (aka "Roll With Me Henry")	Etta James	Modern Records	1955	R&B	Single	2008
Walt Disney's Fantasia Soundtrack	Philadelphia Orchestra conducted by Leopold Stokowski	Walt Disney	1940	Classical	Album	2004
Waltz for Debby	Bill Evans & his Trio	Riverside	1962	Jazz	Album	1998
"The Wanderer"	Dion	Laurie	1961	R&B	Single	2017
Wanted! The Outlaws	Waylon Jennings, Willie Nelson, Jessi Colter, & Tompall Glaser	RCA Victor	1976	Outlaw Country	Album	2007
"War"	Edwin Starr	Gordy	1970	Psychedelic Soul	Single	1999
"Wasted Days and Wasted Nights"	Freddy Fender	Dot	1975	Swamp Pop	Single	2012
"Watermelon Man"	Mongo Santamaría	Battle	1962	Jazz	Single	1998
"The Way We Were"	Barbra Streisand	Columbia	1973	Pop	Single	2008
"The Way You Look Tonight"	Fred Astaire	Brunswick	1936	Soundtrack	Single	1998
"We Are Family"	Sister Sledge	Cotillion	1979	Soul	Single	2008
"We Are the World"	USA for Africa (Tina Turner, Lionel Richie, Michael Jackson, Stevie Wonder, Billy Joel, Kim Carnes, etc.)	Columbia	1985	Pop, Gospel	Single	2021
"We Gotta Get out of This Place"	The Animals	Columbia Graphophone	1965	Rock	Single	2011
We Shall Overcome	Pete Seeger	Columbia	1963	Folk	Album	1999
"Weather Bird"	Louis Armstrong & Earl Hines	Okeh	1928	Jazz	Single	2008
The Weavers at Carnegie Hall	The Weavers	Vanguard	1957	Folk	Album	1998
Weill: The Threepenny Opera	Cast: Jo Sullivan, Charlotte Rae, Lotte Lenya, Bea Arthur, Scott Merrill, Gerald Price, Martin Wolfson	Decca	1954	Musical show	Album	1994
"West End Blues"	Louis Armstrong and his Hot Five	Okeh	1928	Blues	Single	1974
West Side Story: Original Broadway Cast Recording	Cast: Carol Lawrence, Larry Kert, Chita Rivera, Reri Grist, Mickey Calin, Tony Mondente, etc.	Columbia	1957	Musical theatre	Album	1991
West Side Story: Film Soundtrack	Cast: Jimmy Bryant, Marni Nixon, Tucker Smith, Rita Moreno, etc.	Columbia Masterworks	1961	Soundtrack	Album	2004
"We've Only Just Begun"	The Carpenters	A&M	1970	Soft Rock	Single	1998
"What a Diff'rence a Day Made"	Dinah Washington	Mercury	1959	Pop	Single	1998
"What a Fool Believes"	The Doobie Brothers	Warner Bros.	1978	Soft Rock	Single	2024
"(What a) Wonderful World"	Sam Cooke	Keen	1960	R&B	Single	2014
"What a Wonderful World"	Louis Armstrong	ABC	1967	Traditional pop	Single	1999
"(What Did I Do to Be So) Black and Blue"	Louis Armstrong & his Orchestra	Okeh	1929	Jazz	Single	2016
"What Kind of Fool Am I?"	Sammy Davis Jr.	Reprise	1962	Pop	Single	2002
"What the World Needs Now Is Love"	Jackie DeShannon	Imperial Records	1965	Soul	Single	2008
"What'd I Say (Part I)"	Ray Charles	Atlantic	1959	R&B	Single	2000
What's Going On	Marvin Gaye	Tamla	1971	Soul	Album	1998
"What's Love Got to Do with It"	Tina Turner	Capitol	1984	Pop	Single	2012
"Wheel of Fortune"	Kay Starr	Capitol	1952	Traditional pop	Single	1998
"When a Man Loves a Woman"	Percy Sledge	Atlantic	1966	Soul	Single	1999
"When the Levee Breaks"	Kansas Joe and Memphis Minnie	Columbia	1929	Country blues	Single	2021
"When the Saints Go Marching In"	Louis Armstrong and His Orchestra	Decca	1938	Jazz	Single	2017
"When You Wish Upon a Star"	Cliff Edwards	Victor	1940	Soundtrack	Track	2002
"Where Did Our Love Go"	The Supremes	Motown	1964	R&B	Single	1999
"Where Have All the Flowers Gone?"	Pete Seeger	Columbia	1960	Folk	Single	2002
"Whispering"	Paul Whiteman And his Ambassador Orchestra	Victor	1920	Jazz	Single	1998
"White Christmas"	Bing Crosby (with the Ken Darby Singers & John Scott Trotter Orchestra)	Decca	1942	Traditional pop	Single	1974
"White Rabbit"	Jefferson Airplane	RCA	1967	Rock	Single	1998
"A Whiter Shade of Pale"	Procol Harum	Deram	1967	Baroque Pop	Single	1998
Whitney Houston	Whitney Houston	Arista	1985	Pop	Album	2013
"Who Do You Love?"	Bo Diddley	Checker	1956	Rock & roll	Single	2010
"Whole Lotta Shakin' Goin On"	Jerry Lee Lewis	Sun Records	1957	Rock & roll	Single	1999
"Whole Lotta Love"	Led Zeppelin	Atlantic	1969	Rock	Single	2007
Who's Next	The Who	Decca	1971	Hard Rock	Album	2007
"Why Do Fools Fall in Love"	Frankie Lymon and The Teenagers	Gee	1956	Doo-Wop	Single	2001
"Wichita Lineman"	Glen Campbell	Capitol	1968	Country	Single	2000
"The Wild Side of Life"	Hank Thompson & his Brazos Valley Boys	Capitol	1952	Country	Single	1999
"Wild Thing"	The Troggs	Fontana (UK); Atco (US)	1966	Garage Rock	Single	2019
The Wildest!	Louis Prima And Keely Smith	Capitol	1956	Swing	Album	1999
"Wildwood Flower"	The Carter Family	RCA Victor	1928	Country	Single	1999
Will the Circle be Unbroken	Nitty Gritty Dirt Band	United Artists	1972	Country	Album	1998
"Will You Love Me Tomorrow"	The Shirelles	Scepter	1960	R&B	Single	1999
"Wipe Out"	The Surfaris	Dot	1963	Surf Rock	Single	2020
"With a Little Help from My Friends"	Joe Cocker	A&M	1968	Rock	Single	2001
The Wizard of Oz: Technicolor Film Soundtrack	Cast: Judy Garland, Billie Burke, The Munchkins, Ray Bolger, Jack Haley, Bert Lahr, Frank Morgan, Margaret Hamilton, etc.	MGM	1956	Soundtrack	Album	2006
"Woodchopper's Ball"	Woody Herman And His Orchestra	Decca	1939	Jazz	Single	2002
Woodstock: Music from the Original Soundtrack and More	Various Artists including John Sebastian, Joan Baez, Country Joe and the Fish, and Crosby, Stills, Nash & Young	Cotillion	1970	Soundtrack	Album	2014
"Wooly Bully"	Sam the Sham and The Pharaohs	MGM	1965	Rock & roll	Single	2009
Workingman's Dead	Grateful Dead	Warner Bros.	1970	Rock	Album	1999
"Worried Life Blues"	Big Maceo Merriweather	Bluebird	1941	Blues	Single	2006
"Wreck of the Old 97"	Vernon Dalhart	Herwin	1924	Folk	Single	2021
Wrecking Ball	Emmylou Harris	Elektra	1995	Country rock	Album	2025
"Yakety Yak"	The Coasters	Atco	1958	Rock & roll	Single	1999
"Yankee Doodle Boy"	Billy Murray	Columbia	1905	Musical theatre	Single	2006
"Yardbird Suite"	Charlie Parker & his Septet	Dial	1946	Bebop	Single	2014
"Yesterday"	Credited to The Beatles; Actual Performer: Paul McCartney	Capitol	1965	Chamber Pop	Single	1997
"Y.M.C.A."	Village People	Casablanca	1978	Disco	Single	2020
"You Always Hurt the One You Love"	Mills Brothers	Decca	1944	Traditional pop	Single	2017
"You Are My Sunshine"	Jimmie Davis	Decca	1940	Country	Single	1999
"You Are So Beautiful"	Joe Cocker	A&M	1974	Pop	Single	2016
"You Are the Sunshine of My Life"	Stevie Wonder	Tamla	1972	Pop	Single	2002
"You Belong to Me"	Jo Stafford	Columbia	1952	Traditional pop	Single	1998
"You Don't Miss Your Water"	William Bell	Stax	1961	Soul	Single	2024
"You Don't Own Me"	Lesley Gore	Mercury	1963	Pop	Single	2017
"You Keep Me Hangin' On"	The Supremes	Motown	1966	Pop	Single	1999
You'll Sing a Song and I'll Sing a Song	Ella Jenkins	Folkways	1966	Folk	Album	2026
"You Made Me Love You (I Didn't Want to Do It)"	Harry James and his Orchestra	Columbia	1941	Pop	Single	2010
"You Really Got Me"	The Kinks	Reprise	1964	Rock	Single	1999
"You Send Me"	Sam Cooke	Keen	1957	R&B	Single	1998
"Your Cheatin' Heart"	Hank Williams	MGM	1953	Country	Single	1983
"(Your Love Keeps Lifting Me) Higher and Higher"	Jackie Wilson	Brunswick	1967	Chicago Soul	Single	1999
"Your Song"	Elton John	DJM	1970	Pop	Single	1998
"You're So Vain"	Carly Simon	Elektra	1972	Soft Rock	Single	2004
"You're The Top"	Ethel Merman	Brunswick	1934	Musical theatre	Single	2008
"You've Got a Friend"	Carole King	Ode	1971	Soft Rock	Track	2002
"You've Got a Friend"	James Taylor	Warner Bros.	1971	Folk Rock	Single	2001
"You've Lost That Lovin' Feelin'"	The Righteous Brothers	Philles	1964	Pop	Single	1998
"You've Really Got a Hold on Me"	The Miracles	Tamla	1962	Soul	Single	1998
"Zip-a-Dee-Doo-Dah"	Johnny Mercer	Capitol	1946	Soundtrack	Single	2010
The Zodiac Suite	Mary Lou Williams	Asch Records	1945	Jazz	Album	2020
Zombie	Fela Kuti & Afrika 70	Coconut	1976	Afrobeat	Album	2025

== See also ==
- Grammy Award
- Grammy Hall of Fame
- List of Grammy Hall of Fame Award recipients (A–D)
- List of Grammy Hall of Fame Award recipients (E–I)
- List of Grammy Hall of Fame Award recipients (J–P)
