= West Side Story (1961 soundtrack) =

1961 soundtrack album by various artists

Soundtrack album by Various
- Released: October 1961
- Recorded: 1960–1961
- Genre: Film soundtrack
- Length: 75:42
- Label: Columbia Masterworks
- Producer: Didier Deutsch

Professional ratings
Review scores
Source	Rating
AllMusic	5/5 stars

West Side Story is the soundtrack album of the 1961 film West Side Story, featuring music by Leonard Bernstein and lyrics by Stephen Sondheim. Released in 1961, the soundtrack spent 54 weeks at No. 1 on Billboard's stereo albums charts, giving it the longest run at No. 1 of any album in history, although some lists instead credit Michael Jackson's Thriller, on the grounds that this run for West Side Story was on a chart for stereo albums only at a time when many albums were recorded in mono. It did also spend 6 weeks at the top of the Billboard chart for mono albums. In 1962, it won a Grammy award for "Best Sound Track Album – Original Cast". In the United States, it was one of the best-selling albums of the 1960s, certifying three times platinum by the RIAA on November 21, 1986.

Though the album was released just a few years after the release of the original broadway cast recording, it is according to musical theater historian Ethan Mordden preferred by some to the earlier version both sentimentally, as the film succeeded in establishing the musical as a "popular masterpiece", and musically, as it contains "beefier orchestration".

== Dubbing ==
In her autobiography, I Could Have Sung All Night, Marni Nixon writes about singing the role of Maria and of her observations of some of the other singers whose voices were dubbed into the film. Very little of the singing in the finished film and on the soundtrack album was contributed by the on-screen stars of the film; while George Chakiris did all of his own singing for the few solo lines of his character Bernardo, Jim Bryant entirely dubbed the singing role of Tony for Richard Beymer, and Rita Moreno's singing as Anita was partly dubbed by Betty Wand (and by Nixon). According to Moreno herself, Wand dubbed all or part of her singing in "A Boy Like That", although it's not clear if that was the total extent of the dubbing she did. Russ Tamblyn, who plays Riff in the film, provided his own vocals for the song "Gee, Officer Krupke" and for a few lines in the "Tonight" ensemble, but in the "Jet Song" he was dubbed by Tucker Smith, who plays the role of Ice in the film. Smith himself sings his character's song "Cool" and his own lines in the "Tonight" ensemble.

Final determination of which voices would be used and to what extent for the film's songs was left to producer Saul Chaplin, who at various times told Nixon that her voice would be used to supplement or extend that of actress Natalie Wood or to replace it altogether. According to various sources, Wood was assured throughout the recording and filming process that her vocals would be used for most of Maria's singing in the film, with Nixon's voice dubbed in only for the higher, more challenging vocal sections, and Wood did lip sync to her own pre-recorded tracks of the songs during filming. But after filming was complete, Nixon post-dubbed or "looped" all of Maria's songs while watching film loops. Nixon also dubbed several lines for Moreno in the latter part of the "Tonight" ensemble, because the range of that section was too high for both Moreno and Betty Wand. Although it was not industry standard at the time, Nixon arranged to receive a small percentage of the royalties for sales of the soundtrack, which, as she did not receive credit for her performance on the album, she indicates helped "salve any wounds".

While the film was released by United Artists, the soundtrack album was produced and released by Columbia Masterworks Records as part of rights it acquired in producing the Broadway cast album.

== Track listing ==
All music by Leonard Bernstein and lyrics by Stephen Sondheim. Vocal performers listed parenthetically after song title.

=== CD version ===
1. "Overture" – 4:39
2. "Prologue" – 6:37
3. "Jet Song" (Tucker Smith, Jets) – 2:06
4. "Something's Coming" (Jim Bryant) – 2:32
5. "Dance at the Gym" (Blues, Promenade, Mambo, Cha-cha, film dialogue, and Jump) – 9:24
6. "Maria" (Bryant) – 2:34
7. "America" (Rita Moreno, George Chakiris, Sharks & Girls) – 4:59
8. "Tonight" (Jim Bryant, Marni Nixon) – 6:43
9. "Gee, Officer Krupke" (Russ Tamblyn, Jets) – 4:14
10. "Intermission" – 1:30
11. "I Feel Pretty" (Nixon, Yvonne Wilder credited as Yvonne Othon, Suzie Kaye, Jo Anne Miya) – 3:35
12. "One Hand, One Heart" (Bryant, Nixon) – 3:02
13. "Tonight Quintet" (Bryant, Nixon, Moreno, Jets, Sharks; the counterpoint section of Anita's vocals are performed here by Nixon) – 3:22
14. "The Rumble" – 2:39
15. "Somewhere" (Bryant, Nixon) – 2:03
16. "Cool" (Tucker Smith, Jets) – 4:21
17. "A Boy Like That/I Have a Love" (Betty Wand, Nixon) – 4:28
18. "Finale" (Natalie Wood, Nixon, Richard Beymer) – 4:20
19. "End Credits" (Instrumental) – 5:09

=== Original LP version ===
==== Side 1 ====
1. "Prologue" - 5:39
2. "Jet Song" - 2:11
3. "Something's Coming" - 2:38
4. "Dance at the Gym" (Blues, Promenade, and Jump) - 3:37
5. "Maria" - 2:40
6. "America" - 5:05
7. "Tonight" - 3:35

==== Side 2 ====
1. "Gee, Officer Krupke" – 4:14
2. "I Feel Pretty" – 3:35
3. "One Hand, One Heart" – 3:02
4. "Tonight Quintet" – 3:22
5. "The Rumble" – 2:39
6. "Cool" – 4:21
7. "A Boy Like That/I Have a Love" – 4:28
8. "Somewhere (Finale)" – 2:03

=== Film (1961) soundtrack song start times ===
Act I

1. "Overture" – Orchestra
2. "Prologue" – Orchestra
3. "Jet Song" – Riff and the Jets
4. "Something's Coming" – Tony - 26:20
5. "Dance at the Gym" – Orchestra
6. "Maria" – Tony - 44:20
7. "America" – Anita, Bernardo, the Sharks and Girls
8. "Tonight" – Tony and Maria - 57:40
9. "Gee, Officer Krupke" – Riff and the Jets
10. "Maria (violin)" – Orchestra

Act II

1. "I Feel Pretty" – Maria, Consuelo, Rosalia, and Francisca
2. "One Hand, One Heart" – Tony and Maria
3. "Tonight Quintet" – Maria, Tony, Anita, Riff, Bernardo, Jets, and Sharks
4. "The Rumble" – Orchestra
5. "Somewhere" – Tony and Maria
6. "Cool" – Ice and Jets
7. "A Boy Like That/I Have a Love" – Anita and Maria
8. "Somewhere (reprise)" – Maria
9. "Finale" – Orchestra

== Chart positions ==
Year	Label & number	Chart	Position
1962	Columbia OL 5670 (Mono) / OS 2070 (Stereo)	Billboard Pop Albums (Billboard 200) (mono and stereo)	1
1962		UK Albums Chart	1
1963	Columbia OL 5670 (Mono) / OS 2070 (Stereo)	Billboard Pop Albums (Billboard 200) (mono and stereo)	1
1963		UK Albums Chart	1

== Personnel ==
=== Performance ===
- Richard Beymer – performer (Tony)
- Jim Bryant – performer (voice double for Richard Beymer)
- George Chakiris – performer (Bernardo)
- The Jets – performers
- Suzie Kaye – performer (Rosalia)
- Jo Anne Miya – performer (Francisca)
- Rita Moreno – performer (Anita)
- Marni Nixon – performer (voice double for Natalie Wood; voice double for Rita Moreno on "Tonight Quintet")
- Yvonne Wilder credited as Yvonne Othon – performer (Consuelo)
- Sharks – performers
- Tucker Smith – performer (Ice; voice double for Russ Tamblyn on "Jet Song")
- Russ Tamblyn – performer (Riff)
- Betty Wand – performer (voice double for Rita Moreno on "A Boy Like That/I Have A Love")
- Natalie Wood – performer (Maria)

=== Production ===
- Mark Cetts – engineer
- Saul Chaplin – musical director, assistant producer
- Didier C. Deutsch – producer
- Johnny Green – conductor, musical director
- Roy Hemming – liner notes
- Bill Ivie – engineer
- Irwin Kostal – musical director, orchestrator
- Ernest Lehman – screenplay
- Boris Leven – production design
- Sid Ramin – musical director, orchestrator
- Jerome Robbins – director, choreographer
- Robert Wise – director

== Certifications and sales ==
Region	Certification	Certified units/sales
Austria (IFPI Austria)	Platinum	50,000^{*}
France (SNEP)	Platinum	300,000^{*}
Germany (BVMI)	Gold	250,000^{^}
Netherlands (NVPI)	Gold	50,000^{^}
Norway	—	7,000
Spain (Promusicae)	Platinum	100,000^{^}
United Kingdom (BPI) Original Soundtrack: 2012-2013 sales	Gold	100,000^{^}
United Kingdom (BPI) Studio Cast Recording: 1985-1986 sales	2× Platinum	600,000^{^}
United States (RIAA)	3× Platinum	3,000,000^{^}
United States (RIAA) Original Cast	Gold	500,000
^{*} Sales figures based on certification alone.^{^} Shipments figures based on certification alone.

== Awards ==
Year	Award type	Categories	Results	Ref.
1962	Grammy Awards	Best Sound Track Album or Recording of Original Cast from a Motion Picture or Television	Won	
