= West Side Story (Original Broadway Cast) =

Cast recording by the original Broadway cast of West Side Story
- Released: 1957
- Recorded: September 29, 1957
- Studio: Columbia 30th Street (New York City)
- Genre: Musical theater
- Length: 78:04
- Label: Columbia
- Producer: Goddard Lieberson; Sylvia Drulie

Professional ratings
Review scores
| Source | Rating |
|---|---|
| AllMusic | 5/5 stars |

West Side Story is the original Broadway cast album of the 1957 musical of the same name. Recorded at the CBS 30th Street Studio three days after the show opened at the Winter Garden Theatre, the album was released in October 1957 in both mono and stereo formats. The album reached the top five of the Billboard Pop Album chart in 1962 and was certified gold by the RIAA the same year.

A remastered 1998 release was augmented with the orchestral suite Symphonic Dances from West Side Story, conducted by composer Leonard Bernstein and performed by the New York Philharmonic, recorded at the Manhattan Center on March 6, 1961.

== Track listing ==
All tracks written by Leonard Bernstein (music) and Stephen Sondheim (lyrics).

1. "Prologue" – 3:50
2. "Jet Song" – 2:10
3. "Something's Coming" – 2:40
4. "The Dance at the Gym" – 3:06
5. "Maria" – 2:40
6. "Tonight" – 3:53
7. "America" – 4:35
8. "Cool" – 4:01
9. "One Hand, One Heart" – 3:03
10. "Tonight (Quintet and Chorus)" – 3:40
11. "The Rumble" – 2:45
12. "I Feel Pretty" – 2:50
13. "Somewhere (Ballet)" – 7:35
14. "Gee, Officer Krupke" – 4:05
15. "A Boy Like That/I Have a Love" – 4:18
16. "Finale" – 2:02

=== Bonus tracks : Symphonic Dances from West Side Story ===
17. "Prologue (Allegro Moderato)" – 4:07
18. "Somewhere (Adagio)" – 3:51
19. "Scherzo (Vivace E Leggiero)" – 1:17
20. "Mambo (Meno Presto)" – 2:14
21. "Cha-Cha (Andantino con Grazia)" – :53
22. "Meeting Scene (Meno Mosso)" – :47
23. "Cool Fugue (Allegretto)" – 3:03
24. "Rumble (Molto Allegro)" – 1:52
25. "Finale (Adagio)" – 2:47

== Personnel ==
=== Performance ===
- Reri Grist – cast (Consuelo of The Sharks) – lead vocals (Track 13), background vocals (12)
- Leonard Bernstein Orchestra – orchestration
- Hank Brunjes – cast (Diesel of The Jets), background vocals (Tracks 2, 8, 10, 14)
- Michael Callan – cast (Riff, leader of The Jets), lead vocals (Tracks 2, 8, 10)
- Erne Castaldo – cast (Toro of The Sharks), background vocals (Track 10)
- Martin Charnin – cast (Big Deal of The Jets), background vocals (Tracks 2, 8, 10, 14)
- Wilma Curley – cast (Graziella of The Jets), background vocals (Tracks 2, 8, 10, 14)
- Grover Dale – cast (Snowboy of The Jets), lead vocals (Track 14)
- Carole d'Andrea – cast (Velma of The Jets), background vocals (Tracks 2, 8, 10, 14)
- Al de Sio – cast (Luis of The Sharks), background vocals (Track 10)
- Marilyn d'Honau – cast (Clarice of The Jets), background vocals (Tracks 2, 8, 10, 14)
- Gene Gavin – cast (Anxious of The Sharks), background vocals (Track 10)
- Frank Green – cast (Mouthpiece of The Jets), background vocals (Tracks 2, 8, 10, 14)
- Lowell Harris – cast (Tiger of The Jets), background vocals (Tracks 2, 8, 10, 14)
- Larry Kert – cast (Tony), lead vocals (Tracks 3, 5–6, 9–10, 13)
- Irwin Kostal Orchestra – orchestration
- Carol Lawrence – cast (Maria), lead vocals (Tracks 6, 9–10, 12–13, 15)
- Ronnie Lee – cast (Nibbles of The Sharks), background vocals (Track 10)
- Ken Leroy – cast (Bernardo, leader of The Sharks), lead vocals (Track 10)
- George Marcy – cast (Pepe of The Sharks), background vocals (Track 10)
- Tony Mordente – cast (A-Rab of The Jets)
- David Winters – cast (Baby John of The Jets): lead vocals (Track 14), background vocals (Tracks 2, 8, 10)
- Jack Murray – cast (Moose of The Sharks), background vocals (Track 10)
- Jay Norman – cast (Juano of The Sharks), background vocals (Track 10)
- Julie Oser – cast (Pauline of The Jets), background vocals (Tracks 2, 8, 10, 14)
- Chita Rivera – cast (Anita), lead vocals (Tracks 7, 10, 15)
- Eddie Roll – cast (Action of The Jets), lead vocals (Track 14), background vocals (2, 8, 10, 14)
- Nanette Rosen – cast (Minnie of The Jets), background vocals (Tracks 2, 8, 10, 14)
- Jamie Sanchez – cast (Chino of The Sharks), background vocals (Track 10)
- Noel Schwartz – cast (Indio of The Sharks), background vocals (Track 10)

=== Production ===
- Sylvia Drulie – associate producer
- Gerald Freedman – assistant director
- Peter Gennaro – choreographer
- Max Goberman – director, musical director
- Jon Eggert – arranger
- Howard Jeffrey – assistant
- Goddard Lieberson – producer
- Harold Prince – arranger
- Oliver Smith – Scenic Designer
- Jean Rosenthal – lighting
- Irene Sharaff – costume design
- Wallace Siebert – assistant

=== Release history ===
- Columbia LP: OS 2001 (stereo) also OL 5230 (mono)—issued 1957
- Columbia LP: S 32603—issued 1973
- Columbia CD: CK 32603—issued 1986
- Columbia Broadway Masterworks CD: SK 60724—issued 1998
- Hallmark CD: 709782—issued 2010
