= West Side Story (2021 soundtrack) =

2021 soundtrack album

West Side Story (Original Motion Picture Soundtrack)

Soundtrack album by Various artists
- Released: December 3, 2021
- Recorded: 2019–2021
- Studios: Manhattan Center; Newman Scoring Stage; Jungle City Studios
- Genre: Film soundtrack
- Label: Hollywood
- Producers: David Newman; Matt Sullivan; Jeanine Tesori

Singles from West Side Story (Original Motion Picture Soundtrack)
- 1. "Balcony Scene (Tonight)" Released: December 1, 2021

West Side Story is the soundtrack album to Steven Spielberg's 2021 film adaptation of the 1957 stage musical, produced by 20th Century Studios and Amblin Entertainment. The album features music by Leonard Bernstein and lyrics by Stephen Sondheim, with vocals from the film's ensemble cast including Ansel Elgort, Rachel Zegler, Ariana DeBose, David Alvarez, Mike Faist and Rita Moreno, who played Anita in the 1961 film adaptation and plays Valentina (a reworked version of the character Doc) in this film.

The soundtrack was released digitally in Dolby Atmos by Hollywood Records on December 3, 2021, and subsequently released on physical CD on December 10, the same day the film was released in theaters.

== Background ==
Composer David Newman arranged and adapted Bernstein's original score for the film, incorporating a number of alterations originally made to Bernstein's Broadway score by Johnny Green for the 1961 film (e.g., interpolation of the "Cool" fugue motif into the "Prologue" and the extended trumpet solo in "Mambo"). Gustavo Dudamel conducted the New York Philharmonic during the film's recording sessions in 2019, with additional recording by the Los Angeles Philharmonic done during the COVID-19 pandemic the following year. Jeanine Tesori served as vocal coach, while frequent Spielberg collaborator John Williams served as music consultant. The film's version of "Tonight", sung by Rachel Zegler and Ansel Elgort, was released as a digital download single on December 1, 2021.

Alongside the soundtrack, "re-imagined" pop covers were also produced, including "Another Day in America" by Kali Uchis and Ozuna, which was released as a single on November 26 by Interscope Records.

== Reception ==
Like the film, the soundtrack received acclaim from critics and was nominated for Best Compilation Soundtrack for Visual Media at the 65th Annual Grammy Awards.

== Track listing ==
All tracks are written by Leonard Bernstein and Stephen Sondheim, except where noted.

No.	Title	Writer(s)	Performer(s)	Length
1.	"Prologue"	Leonard Bernstein	Orchestra	5:54
2.	"La Borinqueña (Sharks Version)"	Fèlix Astol i Artés; Lola Rodríguez de Tió	David Alvarez; Sharks	1:06
3.	"Jet Song"	Bernstein; Stephen Sondheim	Mike Faist; Kyle Coffman; Kevin Csolak; John Michael Fiumara; Patrick Higgins; Ben Cook; Jets	2:11
4.	"Something's Coming"	Bernstein; Sondheim	Ansel Elgort	2:30
5.	"The Dance at the Gym: Blues, Promenade"	Bernstein	Orchestra	2:11
6.	"The Dance at the Gym: Mambo"	Bernstein	Orchestra	3:19
7.	"The Dance at the Gym: Cha-Cha, Meeting Scene, Jump"	Bernstein	Orchestra	3:28
8.	"Maria"	Bernstein; Sondheim	Elgort	3:05
9.	"Balcony Scene (Tonight)"	Bernstein; Sondheim	Rachel Zegler; Elgort	5:24
10.	"Transition to Scherzo / Scherzo"	Bernstein	Orchestra	2:14
11.	"America"	Bernstein; Sondheim	Ariana DeBose; Alvarez; Ana Isabelle; Sharks; Shark Girls	4:57
12.	"Gee, Officer Krupke"	Bernstein; Sondheim	Kevin Csolak; Fiumara; Jess LeProtto; Ben Cook; Myles Erlick; Patrick Higgins; Kyle Allen	4:20
13.	"One Hand, One Heart"	Bernstein; Sondheim	Elgort; Zegler	3:45
14.	"Cool"	Bernstein; Sondheim	Elgort; Faist	4:03
15.	"Tonight Quintet"	Bernstein; Sondheim	Faist; Alvarez; DeBose; Elgort; Zegler; Jets; Sharks	3:28
16.	"The Rumble"	Bernstein	Orchestra	3:10
17.	"I Feel Pretty"	Bernstein; Sondheim	Zegler; Ilda Mason; Isabelle; Andréa Burns; Tanairi Sade Vazquez; Yassmin Alers; Jamila Velazquez; Annelise Cepero	2:58
18.	"Somewhere"	Bernstein; Sondheim	Rita Moreno	3:10
19.	"A Boy like That / I Have a Love"	Bernstein; Sondheim	DeBose; Zegler	5:25
20.	"Finale"	Bernstein	Orchestra	3:36
21.	"End Credits"	Bernstein	Orchestra	9:03
Total length:				79:00

== Personnel ==
- Leonard Bernstein with Irwin Kostal and Sid Ramin – original orchestrations
- Garth Sunderland – additional orchestrations
- Matt Sullivan – music supervisor/soundtrack producer
- Gustavo Dudamel – conductor
- Joe E. Rand – music editor
- Ramiro Belgardt – music editor
- Peter Rotter – music contractor
- Steven Spielberg – executive soundtrack producer
- Kristie Macosko Krieger – executive soundtrack producer
- David Newman – arrangements
- Jeanine Tesori – supervising vocal producer
- John Williams – music consultant

== Charts ==
Chart performance for West Side Story
Chart (2021–2022)	Peak position
Japanese Albums (Oricon)	40
Japanese Hot Albums (Billboard Japan)	45
US Independent Albums (Billboard)	31
US Soundtrack Albums (Billboard)	10
US Top Album Sales (Billboard)	38
