= Tonight (West Side Story song) =

Song from the musical "West Side Story"

Song
- Published: 1956 by G. Schirmer
- Released: 1957
- Composer: Leonard Bernstein
- Lyricist: Stephen Sondheim

"Tonight" is a song composed by Leonard Bernstein with lyrics by Stephen Sondheim that was written for the 1957 musical West Side Story, where it is presented in two parts. It originated as a section of the "Tonight Quintet" that has been covered by many artists and had success on the record charts. Additional lyrics were later written for use in a scene that takes place on a fire escape.

== Composition and lyrics ==
West Side Story is an adaptation of William Shakespeare's Romeo and Juliet with the characters Tony and Maria as young lovers in 1950s New York. The lyrics of the "Tonight Quintet", a number near the end of Act I, conveyed their anticipation of reuniting later that evening as well as the intentions of other characters in the story. The melody for Tony and Maria's lyrics was initially intended to be used only for the quintet.

The balcony scene in Romeo and Juliet was reimagined on a fire escape for West Side Story using "One Hand, One Heart", a song that the musical's book writer, Arthur Laurents, did not feel was the best fit:

I objected to "One Hand, One Heart" for the Balcony Scene as being too pristine for hot, passionate young lovers. Lenny and Steve liked it because it was pristine until Oscar [Hammerstein] came to a rehearsal and disagreed with them.

As a replacement for "One Hand, One Heart", the music from the quintet was chosen for what would be called "Tonight". In his book Leonard Bernstein: West Side Story, historical musicology professor Nigel Simeone described the new lyrics written as "a far more fervent expression of young love for Tony and Maria".

In 2020, Sondheim told 60 Minutes correspondent Bill Whitaker that Tony's line "Today the world was just an address" from the balcony scene bothered him:

I thought, "Wait a minute, that sure sounds like he's been reading a lot to me." I can't imagine that a kid would say, having just met this girl and being, you know, the kind of kid he is, a street kid, would come up with a phrase that fancy.

He concluded, "[I]f I had to do it all over again, I wouldn't write that line ... I know better now."

== Stage and screen recordings ==
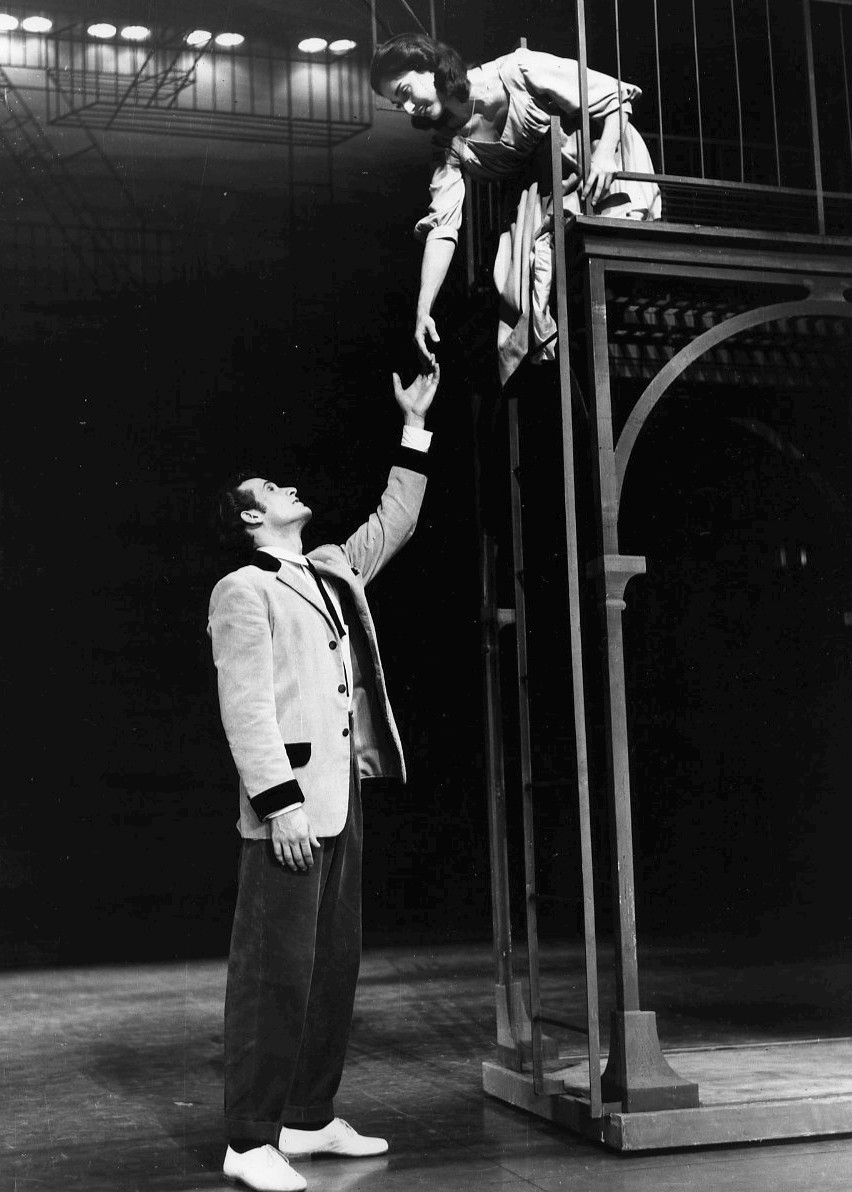
Larry Kert and Carol Lawrence in the balcony scene (1957)

In the original 1957 Broadway production of West Side Story, "Tonight" was performed by Larry Kert and Carol Lawrence in the roles of Tony and Maria. In the 1961 film adaptation of the musical, the song was performed by Marni Nixon (dubbing Natalie Wood as Maria) and Jimmy Bryant (dubbing Richard Beymer as Tony). This rendition of the song is listed at number 59 on AFI's 100 Years...100 Songs survey of top tunes in American cinema.

=== 2021 film ===
In the 2021 film adaptation, "Tonight" was performed by Rachel Zegler as Maria and Ansel Elgort as Tony, and was released as a digital download single from the film's soundtrack album on December 1, 2021. Leonard Maltin included "Tonight" on a list of songs from the new film that were "as haunting and beautiful as the day they were written". A. S. Hamrah of The Baffler, however, was also very critical of the line "The world was just an address", describing it as "a lyric that never sounded so fatalistic to me until I heard it in a Spielberg movie in 2022, with the wealth gap widening and pushing all but the richest people out of [New York City]".

Reviews of the film commented on how the shooting of the scenes including the song highlighted the skills of director Steven Spielberg. Christina Newland of The i Paper singled out the song as one that represented "the panache of his restaged musical numbers from the Sondheim playbook". Dallas King of Outtake described the quintet scene as one of the "moments demonstrating that old Spielbergian magic". Tim Brayton of Alternate Ending felt the balcony scene was one of the film's better moments: "'Tonight' has been turned into a stand-off between Tony and the prison-like maze of metal stairs through which he's been framed."

"Tonight" elicited enthusiastic praise for Zegler. Screen Daily's Tim Grierson listed it as one of the songs in which "Zegler captures the character's innocence and goodheartedness, while hinting at the steel beneath the pleasant surface". Dan Buffa of the St. Louis Jewish Light described her performance of the song as "jaw-dropping". David Lynch of KENS wrote:

Star-in-the-making Rachel Zegler astounds as Maria, creating an instantly sympathetic dimension to her desire opposite Ansel Elgort's comparatively stiff Tony; as much as instant commitment swims behind her eyes in their rendition of "Tonight," you may also spot a glint of astonishment that this independent personality could allow herself to be swept up so easily.

== Ferrante and Teicher version ==
"Tonight"

Single by Ferrante & Teicher

from the album Music from the Motion Picture West Side Story and Other Motion Picture and Broadway Hits
- B-side: "Dream of Love"
- Released: 1961
- Recorded: 1961
- Genre: Pop
- Length: 2:52
- Label: United Artists
- Songwriters: Leonard Bernstein; Stephen Sondheim
- Producer: Don Costa

Ferrante & Teicher singles chronology
"Goodbye Again" (1961)	"Tonight" (1961)	"Smile" / "Street of Palms (Via Margalene)" (1962)

Music video
- "Tonight" on YouTube

The first recording of "Tonight" to reach any of the charts in Billboard magazine was a mostly instrumental version by pianist duo Ferrante and Teicher. It debuted on the Billboard Hot 100 in the issue of the magazine dated October 16, 1961, which coincided with the opening of the film version on October 18. Their recording peaked at number 8 during its 13 weeks there. It also spent 3 of its 12 weeks on the magazine's Easy Listening chart at number 2. It reached number 6 on Cash Box magazine's best seller list and number 9 on the Top 100 Pop Sales and Performance chart in Music Vendor magazine. On Canada's pop singles chart, it got as high as number 14.

=== Critical reception ===
The editors of Billboard described the Ferrante and Teicher version as a "dramatic instrumental treatment of the lovely West Side Story theme". In their review column, the editors of Cash Box magazine featured the single as their Pick of the Week, which was their equivalent to a letter grade of A for both "Tonight" and its B-side, "Dream of Love". They wrote, "'Tonight', the beautiful ballad from the B'way musical (and up-coming pic) West Side Story, is now displayed in a fabulous Latin beat choral-ork showcase."

=== Charts ===
Weekly chart performance for "Tonight" by Ferrante & Teicher
Chart (1961)	Peak position
Canada (CHUM Hit Parade)	14
US Billboard Hot 100 (Billboard)	8
US Billboard Adult Contemporary	2
US Top 100 Best Selling Tunes on Records (Cash Box)	6
US Top 100 Pop Sales and Performance (Music Vendor)	9

== Eddie Fisher version ==
"Tonight"

Single by Eddie Fisher
- B-side: "Breezin' Along with the Breeze"
- Released: 1961
- Recorded: 1960
- Genre: Pop
- Length: 2:44
- Label: Seven Arts
- Songwriters: Leonard Bernstein; Stephen Sondheim

Eddie Fisher singles chronology
"Summertime Love" (1960)	"Tonight" (1961)	"Shalom" / "Milk and Honey" (1961)

Music video
- "Tonight" on YouTube

Eddie Fisher recorded "Tonight" for his 1960 album Tonight with Eddie Fisher. When the film version of the musical became a success the following year, 7 Arts Records licensed it and released it as a single. It debuted on the Billboard Hot 100 in the issue of the magazine dated November 6, 1961, and peaked at number 44. On their Easy Listening chart it got as high as number 12. It also reached number 39 in Music Vendor and number 9 on Cash Box's Looking Ahead chart, which was described as a "compilation, in order of strength, of up and coming records showing signs of breaking into The Cash Box Top 100".

=== Critical reception ===
In their review of Tonight with Eddie Fisher, the editors of Cash Box described the song as one of the album tracks on which he "performs beautifully". In a retrospective review of the album, William Ruhlmann of AllMusic listed "Tonight" as one of the songs on the album that "gave him opportunities for his trademark belting".

=== Charts ===
Weekly chart performance for "Tonight" by Eddie Fisher
Chart (1961)	Peak position
US Billboard Hot 100 (Billboard)	44
US Billboard Easy Listening	12
US Looking Ahead (Cash Box)	9
US Top 100 Pop Sales and Performance (Music Vendor)	39

== Jay and the Americans version ==
"Tonight"

Single by Jay and the Americans

from the album She Cried
- B-side: "The Other Girls"
- Released: 1961
- Recorded: 1961
- Genre: Pop
- Length: 2:28
- Label: United Artists
- Songwriters: Leonard Bernstein; Stephen Sondheim
- Producer: Jerry Leiber and Mike Stoller

Jay and the Americans singles chronology
"Tonight" (1961)	"She Cried" (1962)

Music video
- "Tonight" on YouTube

"Tonight" was the debut single by Jay and the Americans and spent its sole chart week in Billboard at number 120 on the "Bubbling Under the Hot 100" chart in the issue dated November 27, 1961. In Music Vendor it peaked at number 78. It was a local hit, selling 45,000 copies in Jay and the Americans' native New York area.

=== Critical reception ===
The editors of Billboard gave their rendition four stars and wrote, "The fine Leonard Bernstein tune … is given an interesting cha cha rhythm reading by the group." The editors of Cash Box wrote, "Lovely ballad … is done with a lush rock-a-cha sound (soprano sax included), with the vocal crew up front." In a retrospective review of the group's She Cried album, Bruce Eder of AllMusic wrote, "Jay Traynor, who sang lead on this material, does well by songs such as … 'Tonight'."

=== Charts ===
Weekly chart performance for "Tonight" by Jay and the Americans
Chart (1961)	Peak position
US Bubbling Under the Hot 100 (Billboard)	120
US Top 100 Pop Sales and Performance (Music Vendor)	78

== Shirley Bassey version ==
"Tonight"

Single by Shirley Bassey
- B-side: "Let's Start All Over Again"
- Released: 1962
- Genre: Pop
- Label: Columbia
- Songwriters: Leonard Bernstein; Stephen Sondheim

Shirley Bassey singles chronology
"I'll Get By (As Long as I Have You)" (1962)	"Tonight" (1962)	"Ave Maria" (1962)

Music video
- "Tonight" on YouTube

Shirley Bassey recorded "Tonight" with an orchestra conducted by Geoff Love. It debuted on the UK Singles Chart dated February 21, 1962, and peaked at number 21 over the course of eight weeks there.

=== Critical reception ===
Writing for New Musical Express, disc jockey Keith Fordyce called the song "brilliant", noting,

There have been many discs of this moving ballad over the past couple of years and none has reached the charts [in the UK]. If Shirley can break the spell and put "Tonight" in the hit parade, I shall be delighted – if ever a song deserved big success, this one does.

=== Charts ===
Weekly chart performance for "Tonight" by Shirley Bassey
Chart (1962)	Peak position
UK Singles Chart	21

== Johnny Mathis version ==
"Tonight"

Single by Johnny Mathis

from the album Faithfully
- Released: 1962
- Recorded: November 6, 1959
- Genre: Pop
- Length: 3:15
- Label: Columbia
- Songwriters: Leonard Bernstein; Stephen Sondheim
- Producer: Mitch Miller

Johnny Mathis singles chronology
"Marianna" (1962)	"Tonight" (1962)	"That's the Way It Is" / "I'll Never Be Lonely Again" (1962)

Music video
- "Tonight" on YouTube

Johnny Mathis recorded "Tonight" on November 6, 1959, for his album Faithfully. The orchestra was conducted by Glenn Osser, and the recording was produced by Mitch Miller. It was number one on the pop chart in the Philippines for four weeks in August 1962.

=== Critical reception ===
Cash Box had reviewed Faithfully in its January 2, 1960, issue and wrote that, at the time, the song was "oft-neglected".

=== Charts ===
Weekly chart performance for "Tonight" by Johnny Mathis
Chart (1962)	Peak position
Philippines	1

== Cover versions ==
Various versions of "Tonight" have been praised by the editors of Billboard in reviews of the albums or singles on which they appear. Regarding the 1960 album Marian McPartland Plays Music of Leonard Bernstein, the editors wrote, "Miss McPartland here puts a selection of these into her own eloquent form of improved expression. The tunes, like … 'Tonight' … seem especially suited to this interesting treatment." Two reviews from 1961 also mentioned the song, including one for Hal Mooney's album Woodwinds and Percussion, in which they described the song as "one fine show tune of the more modern era". They categorized Eddie Fisher's recording as a Special Merit Single and gave it four stars, describing it as an "attractive rendering of the pretty tune". Several releases from 1962 included the song. In their review of the Roger Williams album Maria, the editors included "Tonight" on a list of songs that "all get the tasteful Williams keyboard treatment with pleasant ork backgrounds". The version on a single by George Greeley earned three stars. In their review of Moon River and Other Great Movie Themes by Andy Williams, the editors included the song on the album's "listenable and highly spinnable selection of movie songs". They gave the Jackie Paris single recording three stars. They selected the song as the "best track" from Andre Kostelanetz's The Wonderful Sound of Broadway's Greatest Hits and Bobby Rydell's An Era Reborn.

The editors of Billboard mentioned "Tonight" in three album reviews from 1963. They included the instrumental version on Ray Ellis's Our Man on Broadway on a list of tracks from the album in which "the performances and production fit the mood of the tune effectively." They wrote that the recording on Nancy Wilson's Broadway – My Way was "linked" with the other songs on the album "in high-styled fashion". In their review of Stardust by Arthur Fiedler and the Boston Pops, they wrote, "The orchestra plays handsome, symphonic-styled arrangements of a dozen great standards, including … 'Tonight'". In 1964 they found noteworthy recordings of the song on two albums. The recording by The Shadows was described as one of the songs that "stand out" on their US release The Shadows Know, which was a repackaging of several tracks from Dance with The Shadows. It was also one of "the standout songs" from On the Street Where You Live by Vic Damone. The editors felt that The Vibrations "excell[ed] with" the song on their 1966 album Misty.

Cash Box also highlighted recordings of "Tonight" by various artists. In their review of the 1959 album Hits from Broadway by The Four Aces, they wrote, "Jack Pleis creates appropriate ork settings on such lovelies as … 'Tonight'." Four reviews from 1960 made mention of the song. They found the performance by The Dave Brubeck Quartet on Bernstein Plays Brubeck Plays Bernstein to be "exemplary". Regarding Marian McPartland Plays Music of Leonard Bernstein, they listed it as one of the songs on which the pianist "improvises freely". Larry Kert and Carol Lawrence, who played Tony and Maria in the original 1957 Broadway production, each released albums including a rendition of the song in 1960. The editors described it as one of the "great songs" from West Side Story in their review of Larry Kert Sings Leonard Bernstein. Regarding the Lawrence album Tonight at 8:30, they wrote, "Possessed of a magnificent voice with wide range, clarity and devastating dramatic impact, she offers … 'Tonight'."

Four releases from 1961 included versions that the editors of Cash Box noted. In their review of Billy Eckstine's Broadway, Bongos and Mr. B, they listed the song as one of its "high points". On George Greeley's album Popular Piano Concertos of Famous Film Themes, they described the song as "lushly portrayed". The Felicia Sanders recording was released as a single, which earned a letter grade of B from the editors, who wrote, "A class presentation." In their review of Moon River by Lawrence Welk, they wrote, "Bandleader is in his usual first-rate form as he reads 'Tonight'." Three recordings from 1962 also garnered notice. In their review of the West Side Story album by Oscar Peterson and his trio, they included "Tonight" in a list of songs that "masterfully proclaim their right to experiment with the Bernstein score". They gave the Paris single a B and wrote that the "West Side Story favorite" was "heard in a light swing light". They also gave the Eddie Harris single a B, describing his rendition as having an "impressive, listenable arrangement". They selected the song as one of the "best tracks" on Marty Gold's 1963 album Sounds Unlimited.

== See also ==
- Tonight Quintet

== Bibliography ==
- Simeone, Nigel (2017), "The Musical Manuscripts", Leonard Bernstein: West Side Story, Taylor & Francis, ISBN 9781351560382
- Whitburn, Joel (2007), Joel Whitburn Presents Billboard Top Adult Songs, 1961-2006, Record Research Inc., ISBN 978-0898201697
- Whitburn, Joel (2009), Joel Whitburn's Top Pop Singles, 1955-2008, Record Research Inc., ISBN 0898201802
- Whitburn, Joel (2012), Joel Whitburn's Hit Records 1954-1982, Record Research Inc., ISBN 978-0-89820-200-7
- Whitburn, Joel (2014), Joel Whitburn's Cash Box Pop Hits 1952-1996, Record Research Inc., ISBN 978-0-89820-209-0
