= Something's Coming (song) =

Song from the musical "West Side Story"

Song by Larry Kert

from the album West Side Story
- Released: October 1957
- Recorded: September 29, 1957
- Studio: CBS 30th Street Studio
- Genre: Show tune
- Length: 2:36
- Label: Columbia
- Composer: Leonard Bernstein
- Lyricist: Stephen Sondheim
- Producer: Goddard Lieberson

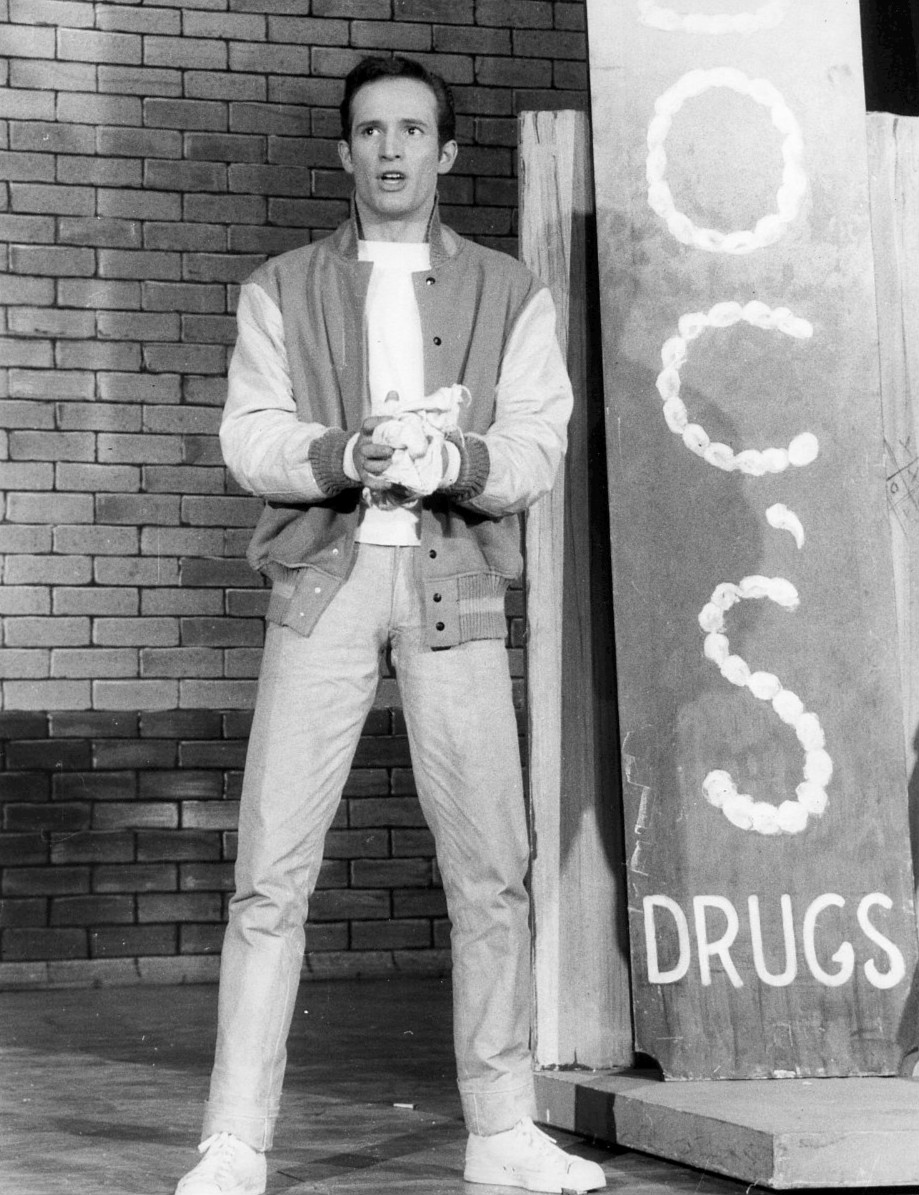
Larry Kert as Tony in the original Broadway production of West Side Story (1957)

"Something's Coming" is a song from the 1957 musical West Side Story. It was composed by Leonard Bernstein with lyrics by Stephen Sondheim and is sung solo by the male lead character and tenor 'Tony'. The part of Tony was played by Larry Kert in the original Broadway production, Richard Beymer (voiced by Jimmy Bryant) in the 1961 film and Ansel Elgort in the 2021 film.

== Production ==
In his work Leonard Bernstein, Humphrey Burton explained: "When it was decided to add Tony’s first-act song "Something’s Coming," Bernstein and Sondheim raided the scene-setting page in Laurents's outline. "something’s coming," Laurents had written: "it may be around the corner, whistling down the river, twitching at the dance – who knows?" The lines were incorporated in the lyrics. "We raped Arthur’s play-writing," Bernstein said. "I’ve never seen anyone so encouraging, let alone generous, urging us, ‘Yes, take it, take it, make it a song.’""

Bernstein reported on the last minute change thus:

. . . I missed you all terribly yesterday. We wrote a new song for Tony ["Something’s Coming"] that’s a killer, and it just wasn’t the same not playing it first for you. It’s really going to save his character – a driving 2/4 in the great tradition (but of course fucked up by me with 3/4s and whatnot) – but it gives Tony balls – so that he doesn’t emerge as just a euphoric dreamer.

== Synopsis ==
BBC.com explains:

'Something’s Coming' is taken from Act I and is Tony’s first solo. At this point he has not met Maria. He has become disillusioned with gang warfare and looks forward to a better future. He wants to leave the Jets but agrees to join them to go to a dance later that evening.

== Composition ==
BBC.com explains "The song opens and closes in D major. It modulates to C major for two contrasting sections of the song...The song opens with a syncopated accompaniment figure in 3/4 time. A similar repeated pattern is heard throughout. The pitches change to fit the harmony. The accompaniment stays in the background throughout so that the singer can be heard clearly. The opening accompaniment is played by clarinets (including bass), pizzicato (plucked) strings, drum kit (snare drum and hi-hat cymbal, played with wire brushes)". The site also noted "the same bar of accompaniment is repeated several times...[as] this gives time for the actors to move across the stage and is a device often used in musicals. It noted that the song alternates between 2/4 and 3/4 time signatures, the word-setting is mostly syllabic (one word to a syllable), and that the song includes many examples of triplets. It also explains "'Something's Coming' does not follow a standard song structure such as verse and chorus. Instead it is held together by three ideas or themes which are heard throughout the song and presented in different ways." The first theme has a "tritone between the bass note C and the F sharp in the vocal line. The F sharp resolves onto a G.", the second has "declamatory repeated notes and the use of accents", and the third has "long sustained notes, legato phrases and rising intervals".

== Critical reception ==
Chichester.col.uk noted the song is meant to "capture...a sense of hope". AllMusic wrote of the Oscar Peterson Trio jazz version of the song "Something's Coming seems like a series of vignettes, constantly shifting its mood, as if moving from one scene to the next. "

In June 2026, CBS News included the song in its list of the 250 essential American songs of the past 250 years.

=== Use in Exams ===
In 2008, the English exam board Edexcel added 'Something's Coming' to their Music GCSE syllabus, and is now used as one of the 12 set works covered in the course, under '20th Century Music'.

== Selected recordings ==
- Larry Kert - on the Broadway cast album (1957)
- Jimmy Bryant - on the 1961 film soundtrack album (1961)
- Sammy Davis Jr. - on the album Sammy Davis Jr. Belts the Best of Broadway (1962)
- Vic Damone - on the album On the Street Where You Live (1964)
- Johnny Mathis - on the album The Shadow of Your Smile (1966)
- Shirley Bassey - on the album 12 of Those Songs (1968)
- Yes - non-album single B side for "Sweetness" (1969), later included on the 2004 reissue of their self-titled debut album
- Todd Rundgren's Utopia - on the album Another Live (1975)
- Barbra Streisand - on the albums The Broadway Album (1985),and One Voice (1987)
- Cécile McLorin Salvant - on the album For One to Love (2015)
- Ansel Elgort - on the 2021 film soundtrack album (2021)
