= AFI's 100 Years...100 Songs =

AFI's 2004 list of top 100 songs in American cinema

AFI 100 Years... series
- 1998: 100 Movies
- 1999: 100 Stars
- 2000: 100 Laughs
- 2001: 100 Thrills
- 2002: 100 Passions
- 2003: 100 Heroes & Villains
- 2004: 100 Songs
- 2005: 100 Movie Quotes
- 2005: 25 Scores
- 2006: 100 Cheers
- 2006: 25 Musicals
- 2007: 100 Movies (Updated)
- 2008: AFI's 10 Top 10

AFI's 100 Years...100 Songs is a list of the top 100 songs in American cinema of the 20th century. The list was unveiled by the American Film Institute on June 22, 2004, in a CBS television special hosted by John Travolta, who appeared in two films honored by the list, Saturday Night Fever and Grease. The list was created by a panel of jurors selected by AFI, who voted from a list of 400 nominated songs.

== The list ==
| # | Song | Film | Year | Performer(s) | Songwriter(s) |
|---|---|---|---|---|---|
| 1 | "Over the Rainbow" | The Wizard of Oz | 1939 | Judy Garland | Harold Arlen, E.Y. Harburg |
| 2 | "As Time Goes By" | Casablanca | 1942 | Dooley Wilson | Herman Hupfeld |
| 3 | "Singin' in the Rain" | Singin' in the Rain | 1952 | Gene Kelly | Nacio Herb Brown, Arthur Freed |
| 4 | "Moon River" | Breakfast at Tiffany's | 1961 | Audrey Hepburn | Henry Mancini, Johnny Mercer |
| 5 | "White Christmas" | Holiday Inn | 1942 | Bing Crosby | Irving Berlin |
| 6 | "Mrs. Robinson" | The Graduate | 1967 | Simon & Garfunkel | Paul Simon |
| 7 | "When You Wish Upon a Star" | Pinocchio | 1940 | Cliff Edwards (as Jiminy Cricket) | Leigh Harline, Ned Washington |
| 8 | "The Way We Were" | The Way We Were | 1973 | Barbra Streisand | Marvin Hamlisch, Alan and Marilyn Bergman |
| 9 | "Stayin' Alive" | Saturday Night Fever | 1977 | The Bee Gees | Barry Gibb, Robin Gibb, Maurice Gibb |
| 10 | "The Sound of Music" | The Sound of Music | 1965 | Julie Andrews | Richard Rodgers, Oscar Hammerstein II |
| 11 | "The Man That Got Away" | A Star Is Born | 1954 | Judy Garland | Harold Arlen, Ira Gershwin |
| 12 | "Diamonds Are a Girl's Best Friend" | Gentlemen Prefer Blondes | 1953 | Marilyn Monroe (also partial dubbing by Marni Nixon) | Jule Styne, Leo Robin |
| 13 | "People" | Funny Girl | 1968 | Barbra Streisand | Jule Styne, Bob Merrill |
| 14 | "My Heart Will Go On" | Titanic | 1997 | Celine Dion | James Horner, Will Jennings |
| 15 | "Cheek to Cheek" | Top Hat | 1935 | Fred Astaire, Ginger Rogers | Irving Berlin |
| 16 | "Evergreen (Love Theme from A Star Is Born)" | A Star Is Born | 1976 | Barbra Streisand | Barbra Streisand, Paul Williams |
| 17 | "I Could Have Danced All Night" | My Fair Lady | 1964 | Marni Nixon (dubbing Audrey Hepburn) | Frederick Loewe, Alan Jay Lerner |
| 18 | "Cabaret" | Cabaret | 1972 | Liza Minnelli | John Kander, Fred Ebb |
| 19 | "Someday My Prince Will Come" | Snow White and the Seven Dwarfs | 1937 | Adriana Caselotti (as Snow White) | Frank Churchill, Larry Morey |
| 20 | "Somewhere" | West Side Story | 1961 | Jimmy Bryant (dubbing Richard Beymer), Marni Nixon (dubbing Natalie Wood) | Leonard Bernstein, Stephen Sondheim |
| 21 | "Jailhouse Rock" | Jailhouse Rock | 1957 | Elvis Presley | Jerry Leiber and Mike Stoller |
| 22 | "Everybody's Talkin'" | Midnight Cowboy | 1969 | Harry Nilsson | Fred Neil |
| 23 | "Raindrops Keep Fallin' on My Head" | Butch Cassidy and the Sundance Kid | 1969 | B. J. Thomas | Burt Bacharach, Hal David |
| 24 | "Ol' Man River" | Show Boat | 1936 | Paul Robeson | Jerome Kern, Oscar Hammerstein II |
| 25 | "High Noon (Do Not Forsake Me, Oh My Darlin')" | High Noon | 1952 | Tex Ritter | Dimitri Tiomkin, Ned Washington |
| 26 | "The Trolley Song" | Meet Me in St. Louis | 1944 | Judy Garland | Hugh Martin, Ralph Blane |
| 27 | "Unchained Melody" | Ghost | 1990 | The Righteous Brothers | Alex North, Hy Zaret |
| 28 | "Some Enchanted Evening" | South Pacific | 1958 | Giorgio Tozzi (dubbing Rossano Brazzi) | Richard Rodgers, Oscar Hammerstein II |
| 29 | "Born to Be Wild" | Easy Rider | 1969 | Steppenwolf | Mars Bonfire |
| 30 | "Stormy Weather" | Stormy Weather | 1943 | Lena Horne | Harold Arlen, Ted Koehler |
| 31 | "Theme from New York, New York" | New York, New York | 1977 | Liza Minnelli | John Kander, Fred Ebb |
| 32 | "I Got Rhythm" | An American in Paris | 1951 | Gene Kelly | George Gershwin, Ira Gershwin |
| 33 | "Aquarius" | Hair | 1979 | Ren Woods, Ensemble | Galt MacDermot, James Rado, Gerome Ragni |
| 34 | "Let's Call the Whole Thing Off" | Shall We Dance | 1937 | Fred Astaire, Ginger Rogers | George Gershwin, Ira Gershwin |
| 35 | "America" | West Side Story | 1961 | Rita Moreno, George Chakiris, Ensemble | Leonard Bernstein, Stephen Sondheim |
| 36 | "Supercalifragilisticexpialidocious" | Mary Poppins | 1964 | Julie Andrews, Dick Van Dyke, Ensemble | The Sherman Brothers |
| 37 | "Swinging on a Star" | Going My Way | 1944 | Bing Crosby | Jimmy Van Heusen, Johnny Burke |
| 38 | "Theme from Shaft" | Shaft | 1971 | Isaac Hayes, Chorus | Isaac Hayes |
| 39 | "Days of Wine and Roses" | Days of Wine and Roses | 1962 | Chorus | Henry Mancini, Johnny Mercer |
| 40 | "Fight the Power" | Do the Right Thing | 1989 | Public Enemy | Carlton Ridenhour, Eric Sadler, Hank Saxley, Keith Boxley |
| 41 | "New York, New York" | On the Town | 1949 | Gene Kelly, Frank Sinatra, and Jules Munshin | Leonard Bernstein, Betty Comden, Adolph Green |
| 42 | "Luck Be a Lady" | Guys and Dolls | 1955 | Marlon Brando, Ensemble | Frank Loesser |
| 43 | "The Way You Look Tonight" | Swing Time | 1936 | Fred Astaire | Jerome Kern, Dorothy Fields |
| 44 | "Wind Beneath My Wings" | Beaches | 1988 | Bette Midler | Jeff Silbar, Larry Henley |
| 45 | "That's Entertainment" | The Band Wagon | 1953 | Fred Astaire, Jack Buchanan, Nanette Fabray, Oscar Levant | Arthur Schwartz, Howard Dietz |
| 46 | "Don't Rain on My Parade" | Funny Girl | 1968 | Barbra Streisand | Jule Styne, Bob Merrill |
| 47 | "Zip-a-Dee-Doo-Dah" | Song of the South | 1946 | James Baskett | Allie Wrubel, Ray Gilbert |
| 48 | "Que Sera, Sera (Whatever Will Be, Will Be)" | The Man Who Knew Too Much | 1956 | Doris Day | Jay Livingston, Ray Evans |
| 49 | "Make 'Em Laugh" | Singin' in the Rain | 1952 | Donald O'Connor | Nacio Herb Brown, Arthur Freed |
| 50 | "Rock Around the Clock" | Blackboard Jungle | 1955 | Bill Haley and His Comets | Max C. Freedman, James E. Myers |
| 51 | "Fame" | Fame | 1980 | Irene Cara | Michael Gore, Dean Pitchford |
| 52 | "Summertime" | Porgy and Bess | 1959 | Loulie Jean Norman (dubbing Diahann Carroll) | George Gershwin, DuBose Heyward |
| 53 | "Goldfinger" | Goldfinger | 1964 | Shirley Bassey | John Barry, Leslie Bricusse, Anthony Newley |
| 54 | "Shall We Dance?" | The King and I | 1956 | Marni Nixon (dubbing Deborah Kerr), Yul Brynner | Richard Rodgers, Oscar Hammerstein II |
| 55 | "Flashdance... What a Feeling" | Flashdance | 1983 | Irene Cara | Giorgio Moroder, Keith Forsey, Irene Cara |
| 56 | "Thank Heaven for Little Girls" | Gigi | 1958 | Maurice Chevalier | Frederick Loewe, Alan Jay Lerner |
| 57 | "The Windmills of Your Mind" | The Thomas Crown Affair | 1968 | Noel Harrison | Michel Legrand, Alan and Marilyn Bergman |
| 58 | "Gonna Fly Now" | Rocky | 1976 | DeEtta Little, Nelson Pigford | Bill Conti, Carol Connors, Ayn Robbins |
| 59 | "Tonight" | West Side Story | 1961 | Marni Nixon (dubbing Natalie Wood), Jimmy Bryant (dubbing Richard Beymer) | Leonard Bernstein, Stephen Sondheim |
| 60 | "It Had to Be You" | When Harry Met Sally... | 1989 | Frank Sinatra, Harry Connick Jr. | Isham Jones, Gus Kahn |
| 61 | "Get Happy" | Summer Stock | 1950 | Judy Garland | Harold Arlen, Ted Koehler |
| 62 | "Beauty and the Beast" | Beauty and the Beast | 1991 | Angela Lansbury (as Mrs. Potts) | Alan Menken, Howard Ashman |
| 63 | "Thanks for the Memory" | The Big Broadcast of 1938 | 1938 | Bob Hope, Shirley Ross | Ralph Rainger, Leo Robin |
| 64 | "My Favorite Things" | The Sound of Music | 1965 | Julie Andrews | Richard Rodgers, Oscar Hammerstein II |
| 65 | "I Will Always Love You" | The Bodyguard | 1992 | Whitney Houston | Dolly Parton |
| 66 | "Suicide Is Painless" | M*A*S*H | 1970 | Chorus | Johnny Mandel, Mike Altman |
| 67 | "Nobody Does It Better" | The Spy Who Loved Me | 1977 | Carly Simon | Marvin Hamlisch, Carole Bayer Sager |
| 68 | "Streets of Philadelphia" | Philadelphia | 1993 | Bruce Springsteen | Bruce Springsteen |
| 69 | "On the Good Ship Lollipop" | Bright Eyes | 1934 | Shirley Temple | Richard A. Whiting, Sidney Clare |
| 70 | "Summer Nights" | Grease | 1978 | John Travolta, Olivia Newton-John | Warren Casey, Jim Jacobs |
| 71 | "(I'm a) Yankee Doodle Dandy" | Yankee Doodle Dandy | 1942 | James Cagney | George M. Cohan |
| 72 | "Good Morning" | Singin' in the Rain | 1952 | Gene Kelly, Donald O'Connor, Debbie Reynolds | Nacio Herb Brown, Arthur Freed |
| 73 | "Isn't It Romantic?" | Love Me Tonight | 1932 | Maurice Chevalier, Jeanette MacDonald | Richard Rodgers, Lorenz Hart |
| 74 | "Rainbow Connection" | The Muppet Movie | 1979 | Jim Henson (as Kermit the Frog) | Paul Williams, Kenneth Ascher |
| 75 | "Up Where We Belong" | An Officer and a Gentleman | 1982 | Joe Cocker, Jennifer Warnes | Jack Nitzsche, Buffy Sainte-Marie, Will Jennings |
| 76 | "Have Yourself a Merry Little Christmas" | Meet Me in St. Louis | 1944 | Judy Garland | Hugh Martin, Ralph Blane |
| 77 | "The Shadow of Your Smile" | The Sandpiper | 1965 | Chorus | Johnny Mandel, Paul Francis Webster |
| 78 | "9 to 5" | Nine to Five | 1980 | Dolly Parton | Dolly Parton |
| 79 | "Arthur's Theme (Best That You Can Do)" | Arthur | 1981 | Christopher Cross | Christopher Cross, Burt Bacharach, Carole Bayer Sager, Peter Allen |
| 80 | "Springtime for Hitler" | The Producers | 1967 | Ensemble | Mel Brooks |
| 81 | "I'm Easy" | Nashville | 1975 | Keith Carradine | Keith Carradine |
| 82 | "Ding-Dong! The Witch Is Dead" | The Wizard of Oz | 1939 | Ensemble | Harold Arlen, E.Y. Harburg |
| 83 | "The Rose" | The Rose | 1979 | Bette Midler | Amanda McBroom |
| 84 | "Put the Blame on Mame" | Gilda | 1946 | Anita Ellis (dubbing Rita Hayworth) | Allan Roberts, Doris Fisher |
| 85 | "Come What May" | Moulin Rouge! | 2001 | Nicole Kidman, Ewan McGregor | David Baerwald, Kevin Gilbert |
| 86 | "(I've Had) The Time of My Life" | Dirty Dancing | 1987 | Bill Medley, Jennifer Warnes | Franke Previte, Donald Markowitz, John DeNicola |
| 87 | "Buttons and Bows" | The Paleface | 1948 | Bob Hope | Jay Livingston, Ray Evans |
| 88 | "Do Re Mi" | The Sound of Music | 1965 | Julie Andrews, Ensemble | Richard Rodgers, Oscar Hammerstein II |
| 89 | "Puttin' on the Ritz" | Young Frankenstein | 1974 | Gene Wilder, Peter Boyle | Irving Berlin |
| 90 | "Seems Like Old Times" | Annie Hall | 1977 | Diane Keaton | Carmen Lombardo, John Jacob Loeb |
| 91 | "Let the River Run" | Working Girl | 1988 | Carly Simon | Carly Simon |
| 92 | "Long Ago (and Far Away)" | Cover Girl | 1944 | Gene Kelly, Martha Mears (dubbing Rita Hayworth) | Jerome Kern, Ira Gershwin |
| 93 | "Lose Yourself" | 8 Mile | 2002 | Eminem | Eminem, Luis Resto, Jeff Bass |
| 94 | "Ain't Too Proud to Beg" | The Big Chill | 1983 | The Temptations | Norman Whitfield, Edward Holland Jr. |
| 95 | "(We're Off on the) Road to Morocco" | Road to Morocco | 1942 | Bing Crosby, Bob Hope | Jimmy Van Heusen, Johnny Burke |
| 96 | "Footloose" | Footloose | 1984 | Kenny Loggins | Kenny Loggins, Dean Pitchford |
| 97 | "42nd Street" | 42nd Street | 1933 | Ruby Keeler, Dick Powell, Ensemble | Harry Warren, Al Dubin |
| 98 | "All That Jazz" | Chicago | 2002 | Catherine Zeta-Jones, Renée Zellweger | John Kander, Fred Ebb |
| 99 | "Hakuna Matata" | The Lion King | 1994 | Nathan Lane, Ernie Sabella, Jason Weaver, Joseph Williams | Elton John, Tim Rice |
| 100 | "Old Time Rock and Roll" | Risky Business | 1983 | Bob Seger | George Jackson, Thomas E. Jones III |

== Most represented films ==
Singin' in the Rain, The Sound of Music, and West Side Story each have three songs on the list, while The Wizard of Oz, Funny Girl and Meet Me in St. Louis each have two entries. A Star is Born is unique in that a film and its remake both made the list for different songs.

== Most represented composers ==
- Richard Rodgers – 6 songs
- Harold Arlen – 5 songs
- Leonard Bernstein – 4 songs
- Jule Styne – 3 songs
- Irving Berlin – 3 songs
- George Gershwin – 3 songs
- Nacio Herb Brown – 3 songs
- John Kander – 3 songs
- Jerome Kern – 3 songs

== Most represented lyricists ==
- Oscar Hammerstein II – 6
- Ira Gershwin – 4
- Irving Berlin – 3
- Stephen Sondheim – 3
- Arthur Freed – 3
- Fred Ebb – 3

== Most represented singers ==
Judy Garland (also listed in first place for "Over the Rainbow") and Gene Kelly are tied with five songs each; all of Garland's songs and two of Kelly's are solos. Julie Andrews, Fred Astaire, Marni Nixon, and Barbra Streisand follow Garland and Kelly with four songs each. Astaire and Nixon were co-credited for three out of their four respective songs listed, while Andrews sang two solos; Streisand performed all four of her songs by herself.
