= One Hand, One Heart =

Song from the musical West Side Story

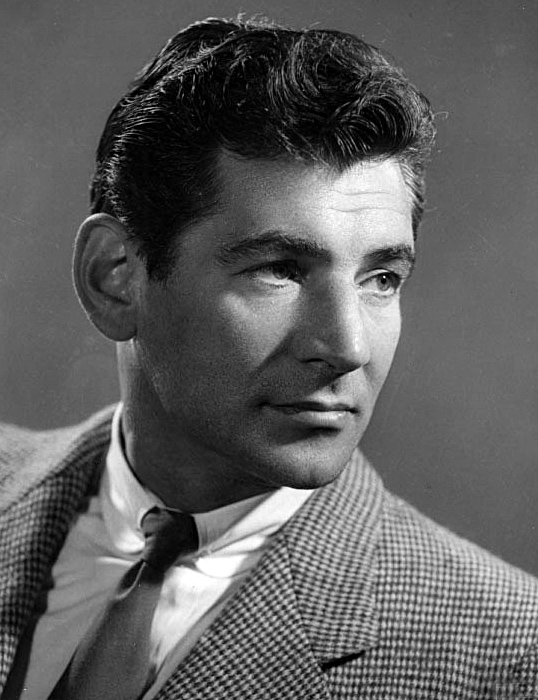
Leonard Bernstein, c. 1950s

"One Hand, One Heart" is a song from the musical West Side Story by Leonard Bernstein and Stephen Sondheim. It is a duet sung between Maria and Tony while they have a make-believe wedding, as seen in the stage version and 1961 film, while in the 2021 film, they sing it as they pledge their love to one another inside a church at The Cloisters as part of their date. Larry Kert and Carol Lawrence introduced it in the 1957 Broadway production.

== Analysis ==
The tune was originally composed for an unused song in Candide, called "One". The original tune comprised just a single dotted note per bar, which Sondheim was loath to write lyrics for, as he would have to write all single syllable words, so he wrote lyrics making fun of the tune to persuade Bernstein to give him the extra notes. Sondheim later wrote of the final product:

Lenny had written only one note for each bar, so each word lay there, heavy and detached from the word that followed. It was like a sequence of anchors. ... As in "Somewhere" the tune hamstrings the lyricist by virtually precluding the use of any two-syllable words, which sound ridiculous when stretched out so slowly. But Lenny was very fond of the melody and wanted to use it for the Balcony Scene, so I asked him merely to give me a couple extra quarter-notes per bar, which didn't change the melodic outline. The paucity of notes did have one virtue: it made me write simply. A little too simply, but still...

Philip Brophy analysis the song's context within the musical:

This number extends the playing-out of social rituals as in the previous number. Here Tony and Maria perform a symbolic marriage because such an actual ceremony is a 'social' impossibility. This reinforces their relationship as being 'above' their social reality, accented by the whole notion of them with their heads 'up in the clouds'. Throughout this number they 'harmonize' with one another and eventually resolve those harmonies into unison, symbolizing their 'oneness' with one another. Note how their call-response itself is a recreation of the vow exchanges in a marriage ceremony. Note also how at the end of the number, the melodic motif of "Maria" slightly upsets the harmonic resolution. This motif – which it must be remembered alludes to Tony's desire to get it on with Maria, and which therefore constitutes a social transgression which works to move the plot along to end tragically – symbolically suggests that their wedding will not take place because 'it shouldn't happen'.

== Notable recordings ==
- Larry Kert and Carol Lawrence – for the album West Side Story (Original Broadway Cast) (1957)
- Jim Bryant and Marni Nixon – West Side Story (Original Sound Track Recording) (1961).
- Vic Damone – a single release in 1963.
- Dionne Warwick – included in her album On Stage and in the Movies (1967)
- Vince Hill – for his album Edelweiss (1967).
- Kiri Te Kanawa and José Carreras – for the album Leonard Bernstein Conducts West Side Story (1985)
- Neil Diamond – for his album Lovescape (1991)
- Barbra Streisand and Johnny Mathis – Back to Broadway (1993)
- Rickie Lee Jones (with Joe Jackson) – for her album It's Like This (2000)
- Ansel Elgort and Rachel Zegler – West Side Story (Original Motion Picture Soundtrack) (2021)
