= Gee, Officer Krupke =

Song from West Side Story

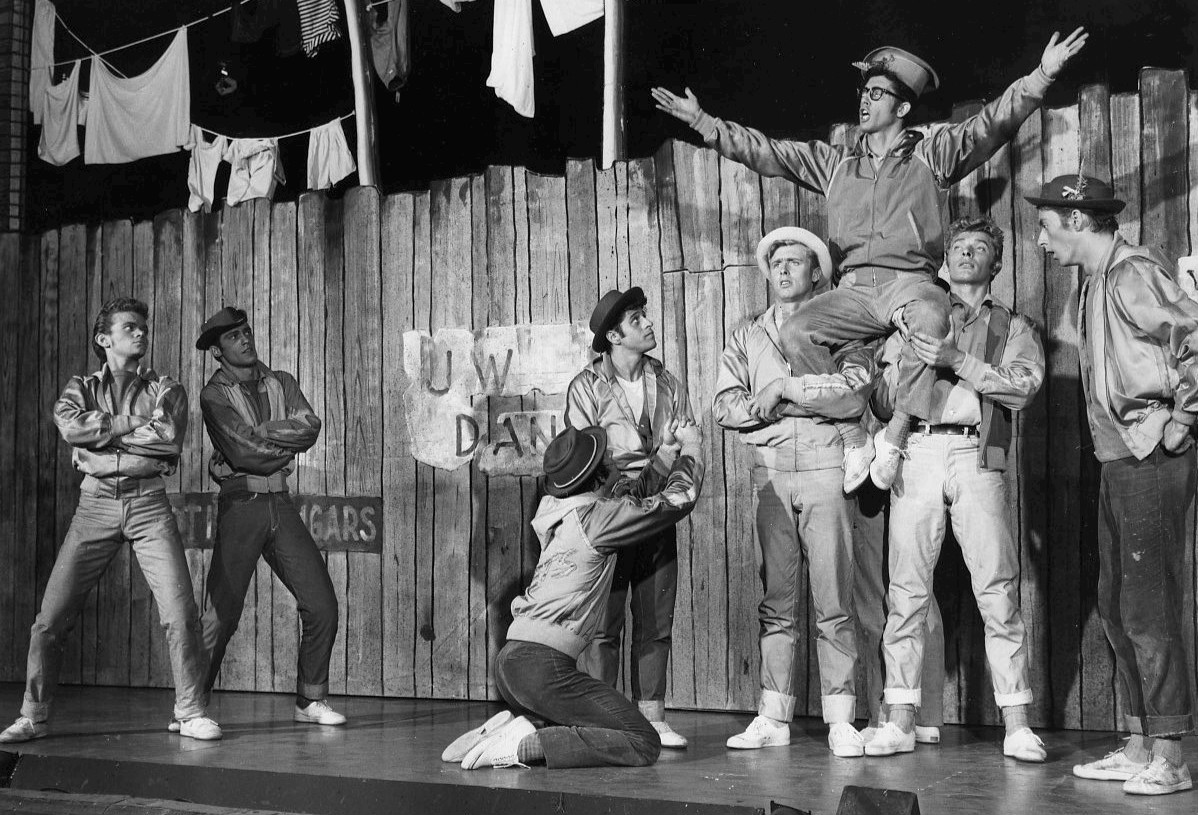
"Gee, Officer Krupke" sung by the Jets, original Broadway cast (1957)

"Gee, Officer Krupke" is a comedy number from the 1957 musical West Side Story. The song was composed by Stephen Sondheim (lyrics) and Leonard Bernstein (music), and was featured in the Broadway musical and subsequent 1961 and 2021 films.

== Music ==
The song is sung by members of the street gang the Jets, who poke fun at the gruff Police Sergeant Krupke by singing about the societal forces that led them to join a gang. Following a theme used throughout the musical, the song begins with a tritone on the word Dear, held longer to signify its importance. Lyrically, the song features four seven-line verses, each filled with puns and wordplay. Each verse culminates with an interjection (e.g., "Golly Moses", "Leapin' lizards"), followed by the final line.

The tune was originally composed for an unused song for the Venice scene in Candide where the lyrics, by John Latouche, ended with the line, "Where does it get you in the end?"

== Censorship ==
The last line of the song (performed as a "Shave and a Haircut" fanfare) is "Gee, Officer Krupke – Krup you!" Lyricist Stephen Sondheim originally wanted to break a then-existing Broadway taboo by ending the song with "Gee, Officer Krupke – fuck you!", but Columbia Records, which owned the rights to the cast album, told Sondheim that the album could then not be shipped to other states without violating the obscenity laws of the era. Accordingly, Sondheim changed the ending of the song to "Krup you", and later told an interviewer that the new line was the best in the whole musical.

== Other versions ==
=== Stage play vs. 1961 film ===
In the original Broadway version, the song appears in the second act, but in the 1961 film version the song was moved to Act One, performed by the Jets (with Riff singing lead) prior to their imminent rumble with the Sharks. For the film's release, "Krupke" was switched with "Cool" (which was originally performed in the play's first act) on a request from Sondheim, who disliked the sequence of the songs in the play, feeling it was unfitting to watch a street gang perform a comedy number right after having seen both gang leaders get killed in the rumble.

Additionally, two stanzas in the film version had their words censored:

1957 Broadway

My father is a bastard,
My ma's an S.O.B.
My grandpa's always plastered,
My grandma pushes tea.

Dear kindly social worker,
They say go earn a buck.
Like be a soda jerker,
Which means I'd be a shmuck.

1961 film

My Daddy beats my Mommy,
My Mommy clobbers me,
My Grandpa is a Commie,
My Grandma pushes tea.

Dear kindly social worker,
They tell me get a job,
Like be a soda jerker,
Which means I'd be a slob.

=== Stage play vs. 2021 film ===
In the 2021 film version, the song—using the lyrics from the 1957 Broadway version—is again moved to the first half, performed prior to the rumble, with "Cool" moved to after "One Hand, One Heart". Additionally, instead of in the streets, the song takes place in the 21st Precinct of the New York City Police Department.

== In popular culture ==
The eighth episode of season seven of Curb Your Enthusiasm is entitled "Officer Krupke". The episode features a police officer whose name is Krupke, to whom Larry David has to describe the relevance of the name in West Side Story, since Krupke has never seen it. At several points, David sings the song, and ultimately is overheard singing the finale by children, who think he has said "Fuck you". "Gee, Officer Krupke" is also used as the end credits song in that episode.

In the second episode of season 4 of The Marvelous Mrs. Maisel, Midge (Rachel Brosnahan) describes a police officer who arrested her based on a misunderstanding as "Officer fucking Krupke".

In the fourth season episode of The West Wing, titled "Election Night", White House staffer Charlie Young is asked by a student he's mentoring to help another student out of a legal bind; Charlie brushes off the request by stating, "I'm not Officer Krupke. I have a job." Later in the conversation, the student retorts, "Who's Officer Cupcake?"

In the thirty-sixth season episode of The Simpsons, titled "Women in Shorts", the grocery store clerks perform a musical number parodying of "Gee, Officer Krupke", when they remind Homer of all the embarrassing products Marge has bought for him in the past after he attempts to avoid searching for the tampons she asks him to find.
