= Carol Lawrence =

American actress, singer, and dancer (b. 1932)

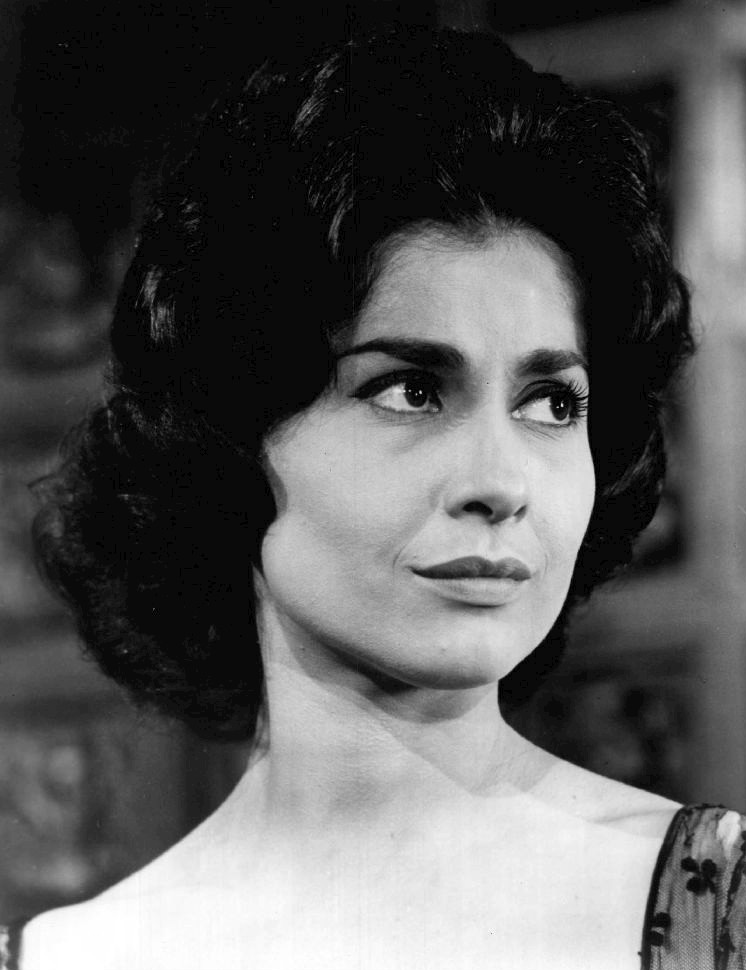
- Lawrence in a scene from the General Electric Theater episode "The Iron Silence" (1961)
- Born: Carolina Maria Laraia; September 5, 1932 (age 94); Melrose Park, Illinois, U.S.
- Occupations: Actress, singer
- Years active: 1952–2018
- Spouses: Cosmo Allegretti (m. 1956; ann. 1959) Robert Goulet (m. 1963; div. 1981) John Gregory Guydus (m. 1982; div. 1983)
- Children: 2

Carol Lawrence (born Carolina Maria Laraia; September 5, 1932) is an American actress, appearing in musical theatre and on television. She is known for creating the role of Maria on Broadway in the musical West Side Story (1957), receiving a nomination for the Tony Award for Best Featured Actress in a Musical. She appeared at The Muny, St. Louis, in several musicals, including Funny Girl. She also appeared in many television dramas, including Rawhide, The Six Million Dollar Man and Murder, She Wrote. She was married to fellow performer Robert Goulet.

== Biography ==
=== Early years ===
Lawrence was born Carolina Maria Laraia on September 5, 1932, in Melrose Park, Illinois. Her parents were of Italian ancestry, her father being born in Trivigno, in the province of Potenza, and her maternal family coming from the same town. Laraia graduated from Proviso Township High School, in Maywood, Illinois. She spent one year at Northwestern University and then left to pursue her career.

=== Career ===
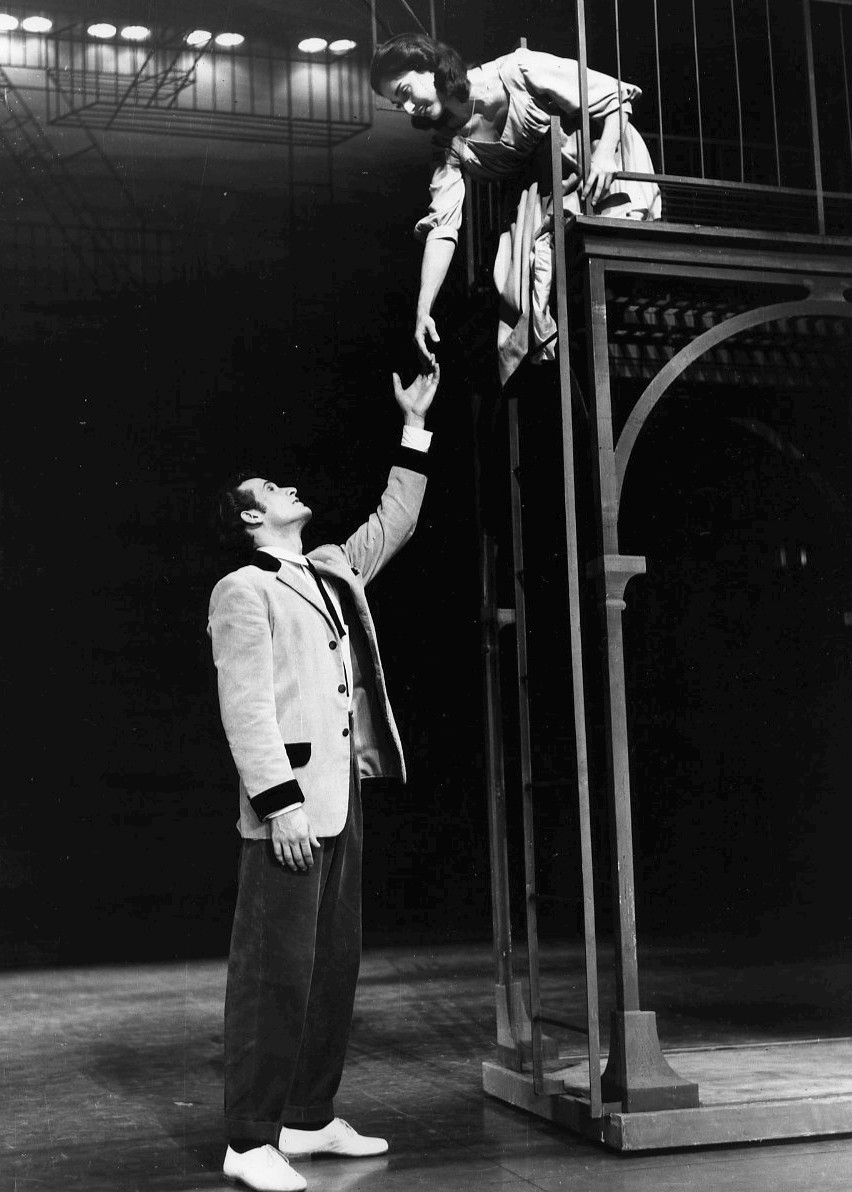
Larry Kert and Carol Lawrence in the balcony scene of West Side Story, original Broadway cast (1957)

Lawrence made her Broadway debut as a Ted Adair Dancer in the 1951 revue Borscht Capades, alongside Joel Grey. She achieved success in the role of Maria in the original Broadway production of West Side Story in 1957, receiving a nomination for the Tony Award for Best Featured Actress in a Musical (even though the part was the lead), losing to Barbara Cook (The Music Man). She played the role for two years, and after an appearance in the short-lived show Saratoga in 1959 she returned to West Side Story for its 1960 season. Other Broadway successes were Subways Are for Sleeping, I Do! I Do! (replacement "She/Agnes", 1967), and Kiss of the Spider Woman (1992–93, replacement Spider Woman/Aurora). Her most recent Broadway credit is serving as standby for Lauren Bacall in the 1999 production of Noël Coward's Waiting in the Wings.

Lawrence made a few record albums of standards and showtunes including Tonight at 8:30 (1960), where she sang studio versions of the songs "Tonight", and "Something's Coming", both from West Side Story.

She appeared in concert, performing at Chautauqua Institute in New York and elsewhere, and on many variety shows on television as a singer and dancer, maintaining her fame as a star performer.

Lawrence played several roles at The Muny in St. Louis, Missouri, the largest outdoor theater in the U.S., including Fanny Brice in Funny Girl (1975), Charity in Sweet Charity (1977), and Lucille Early in No, No, Nanette (1990). Among her other musical theatre parts are the title role in Mame (2000 at the Helen Hayes Center for Performing Arts in Nyack, New York), Guenevere in Camelot (opposite husband Robert Goulet), Do I Hear a Waltz? at the Pasadena Playhouse (2001), and Follies at the Wadsworth Theatre in Los Angeles in 2002.

Her television performances include a guest role in Breaking Point (as Evelyn Denner in the 1963 episode titled "There Are the Hip, and There Are the Square"). In October 1976, she appeared as the special guest on the popular weekly variety program The Bobby Vinton Show, which aired across the United States and Canada. She performed "Friend of the Father". Other appearances include Rawhide; Combat!; Wagon Train; The Fugitive; The Big Valley; Hawaii Five-O; Marcus Welby, M.D.; Medical Center; Kung Fu; Mannix; Murder, She Wrote; Saved by the Bell; and Sex and the City.

From 1991 to 1993, she played the role of matriarch Angela Eckart on General Hospital. She hosted five shows of Chef du Jour for the Food Network, cooking from I Remember Pasta, her own cookbook, and setting a record for cookbook sales on the Home Shopping Network.

In 1999, she appeared in the television movie remake of Jason Miller's That Championship Season in a cameo role as Claire's mother (the mother-in-law of Vincent D'Onofrio's character), a role written into the film specifically for her. In 2013, she appeared Off-Broadway at the Westside Theatre Downstairs in Jason Odell Williams's play Handle with Care.

Lawrence has written her autobiography, with Phyllis Hobe, titled Carol Lawrence: The Backstage Story, published in 1990.

== Awards ==
- The Theatre World Award "Most Promising Newcomer" West Side Story 1958
- Lawrence was awarded the Harvard Hasty Pudding Woman of the Year Award in 1960.
- She has a star on the Hollywood Walk of Fame.

== Personal life ==
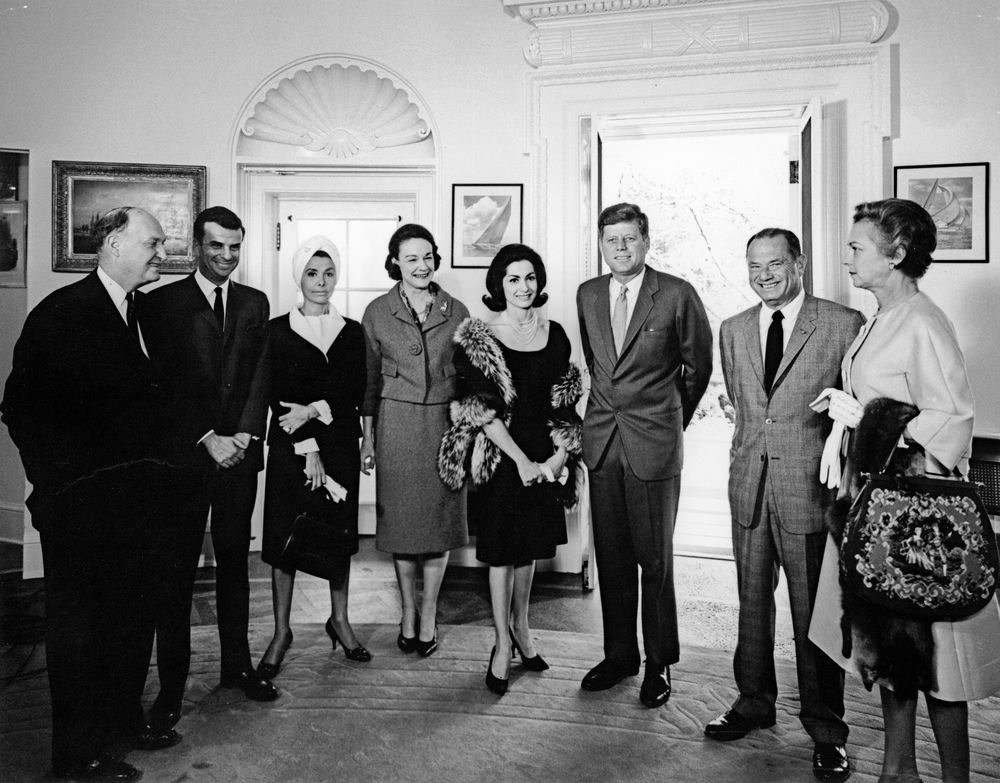
Lawrence (center) next to John F. Kennedy at the White House, two days before Kennedy's assassination

Lawrence married three times:

- Cosmo Allegretti (January 13, 1956 – January 30, 1959; annulled)
- Robert Goulet (1963–1981); together they had two sons, Christopher (b. 1964) and Michael Goulet (b. 1966).
- Greg Guydus (March 7, 1982 – December 12, 1984)

Lawrence and Goulet married while both were Broadway stars; their romance was treated in the press like a fairy-tale. In her 1990 book Carol Lawrence: The Backstage Story, she accused Goulet of being an alcoholic and an abusive husband and father.

Lawrence, a registered Democrat, accompanied Democratic National Committee (DNC) Chairman John Bailey, DNC Vice-chairwoman Margaret B. Price, DNC Secretary Dorothy Vredenburgh Bush, Lena Horne, Richard Adler, and Sidney Salomon on a visit with President John F. Kennedy at The White House on November 20, 1963, two days before his assassination.

Lawrence is Presbyterian and a member of the Bel Air Presbyterian Church.
