= Tonight Quintet =

Song from the musical "West Side Story"

Song

from the album West Side Story
- Released: 1957
- Genre: show tune
- Composer: Leonard Bernstein
- Lyricist: Stephen Sondheim

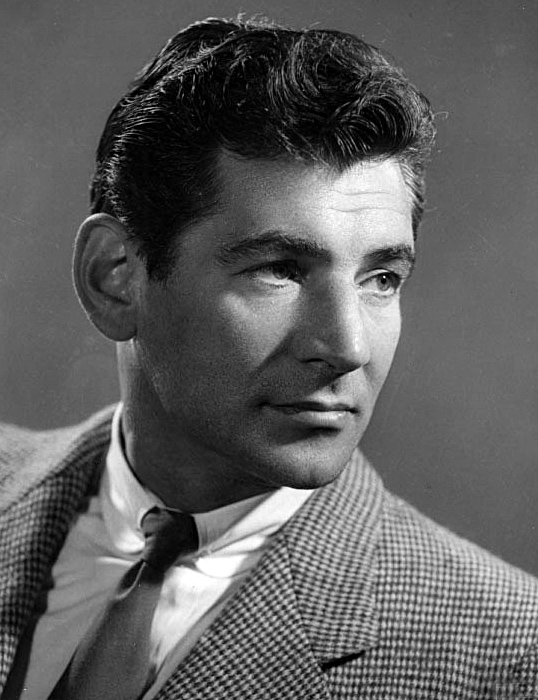
Leonard Bernstein, c. 1950s

The "Tonight Quintet" is a number from the musical West Side Story (1957), with music by Leonard Bernstein and lyrics by Stephen Sondheim.

The five parts of the quintet are sung by the Jets, the Sharks, Tony, Maria, and Anita. The song begins with the parts sung in turn, and then overlapping and building to the final line, "Tonight", sung by the ensemble with multiple harmonies. The Jets and the Sharks are rival gangs anticipating the "rumble" which will settle a territorial feud that has been brewing between them for some time. Both groups are confident that the fight will end in their favor. The song is used to show anticipation to the coming night, which will end up being the climactic part of the play.

Anita sings of her anticipation for her boyfriend, Bernardo, the leader of the Sharks, to return after the rumble. She knows that he is usually riled up after a fight like this and she looks forward to having some intimate time together and "getting her kicks." In the 1961 film version of West Side Story, Anita sings "He'll walk in hot and tired, poor dear / No matter if he's tired, as long as he's here" rather than "He'll walk in hot and tired, so what / No matter if he's tired, as long as he's hot." In the 2021 film version, the original lyrics are restored.

Tony, a member of the Jets, has fallen in love with Maria, Bernardo's sister. At Maria's request, he plans to go to the rumble and stop the fight. Maria and Tony sing about their eagerness to see each other after Tony returns; they believe that after Tony stops the fight, the tension surrounding their forbidden love will finally vanish and the night will be "endless." They are frustrated by the seemingly slow pace of the present day while they are anticipating the coming night.

== As a reprise ==
Tony and Maria's verses constitute a reprise of "Tonight", a song from earlier in West Side Story sung during a scene when the lovers meet on a fire escape. However, the melody was originally written for the Quintet, and was adapted into the earlier "Tonight" song when Arthur Laurents, the musical's book writer, objected to the number Sondheim and Bernstein had originally written for the fire escape scene.

== Critical response ==
Carol J. Oja has written that, "with the 'Tonight' quintet, Bernstein once again created a masterpiece of ensemble, one that rivals the best of such moments in European opera." Her remark echoes the earlier view of Will Crutchfield. In his review of the 1984 studio performance of West Side Story, which was conducted by Bernstein himself, Crutchfield wrote that the release of the recording "is above all an occasion for celebrating one of the great operas of our century. ... This idea is hotly resisted, but the best argument for it is here on the records in the music itself. I can see no reason why the 'Tonight' ensemble should not be compared to the quartet from Rigoletto."

The dramatically contrasting elements in this scene and their corresponding presentation in music have also been compared to the trio "Cosa sento!" from Mozart's The Marriage of Figaro.
