= Larry Kert =

American actor (1930–1991)

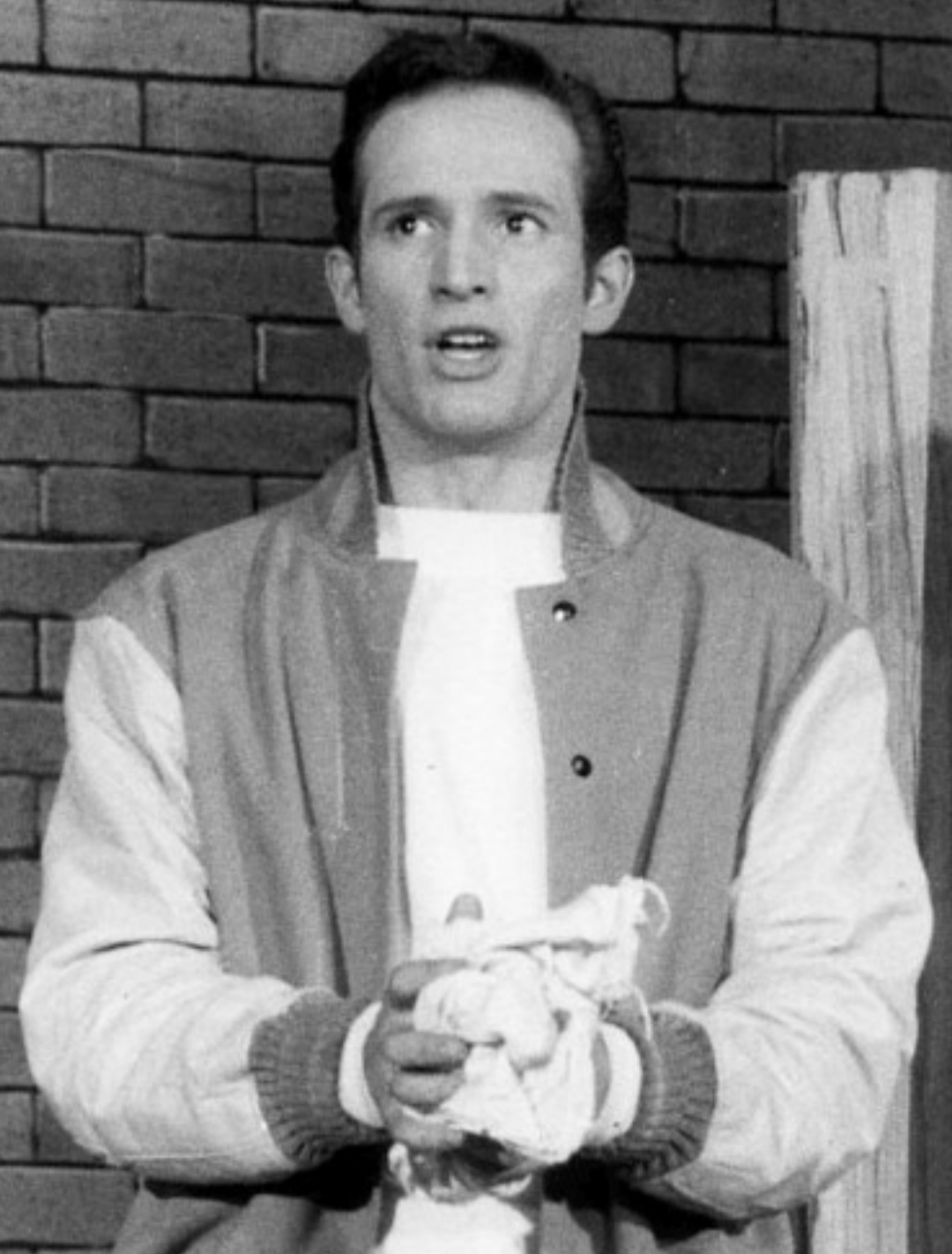
- Kert as Tony in the original Broadway production of West Side Story (1957)
- Born: Lawrence Frederick Kert; December 5, 1930; Los Angeles, California, U.S.
- Died: June 5, 1991 (aged 60); New York City, U.S.
- Occupations: Actor; singer; dancer
- Years active: 1950–1989
- Known for: Tony in West Side Story
- Partner: Ron Pullen
- Relatives: Anita Ellis (sister)

Lawrence Frederick Kert (December 5, 1930 – June 5, 1991) was an American stage actor. He is best known for his role of Tony in the original Broadway production of the musical West Side Story. He was nominated for a Tony Award (1971) for his work in the musical comedy Company (1970).

== Early life ==
Kert was born in Los Angeles, the youngest of four children of Orthodox Jewish parents, Harry and Lillian (née Pearson; originally Peretz) Kert (some sources cite the family surname as Kurt). Kert's eldest sibling, Anita, became a vocalist, noted for dubbing Rita Hayworth and other non-singing stars in their films. He and his siblings graduated from Hollywood High School. A Shubert Theater Playbill for 1963's I Can Get It For You Wholesale, starring Kert states: "He attended Los Angeles City College. As a teenager he worked at breaking wild horses to saddle—which led to a teen-age career as a stunt man, stand-in, and extra in well-nigh 100 films". He later dropped out of Los Angeles City College and moved to New York to study acting and singing.

Kert's first professional credit was as a member of a theatrical troupe called the "Bill Norvas and the Upstarts" in the 1950 Broadway revue Tickets, Please!. After a seven-month run, he worked sporadically in Broadway, Off-Broadway and ballet productions as a dancer until 1957, when he was cast in West Side Story.

== West Side Story ==
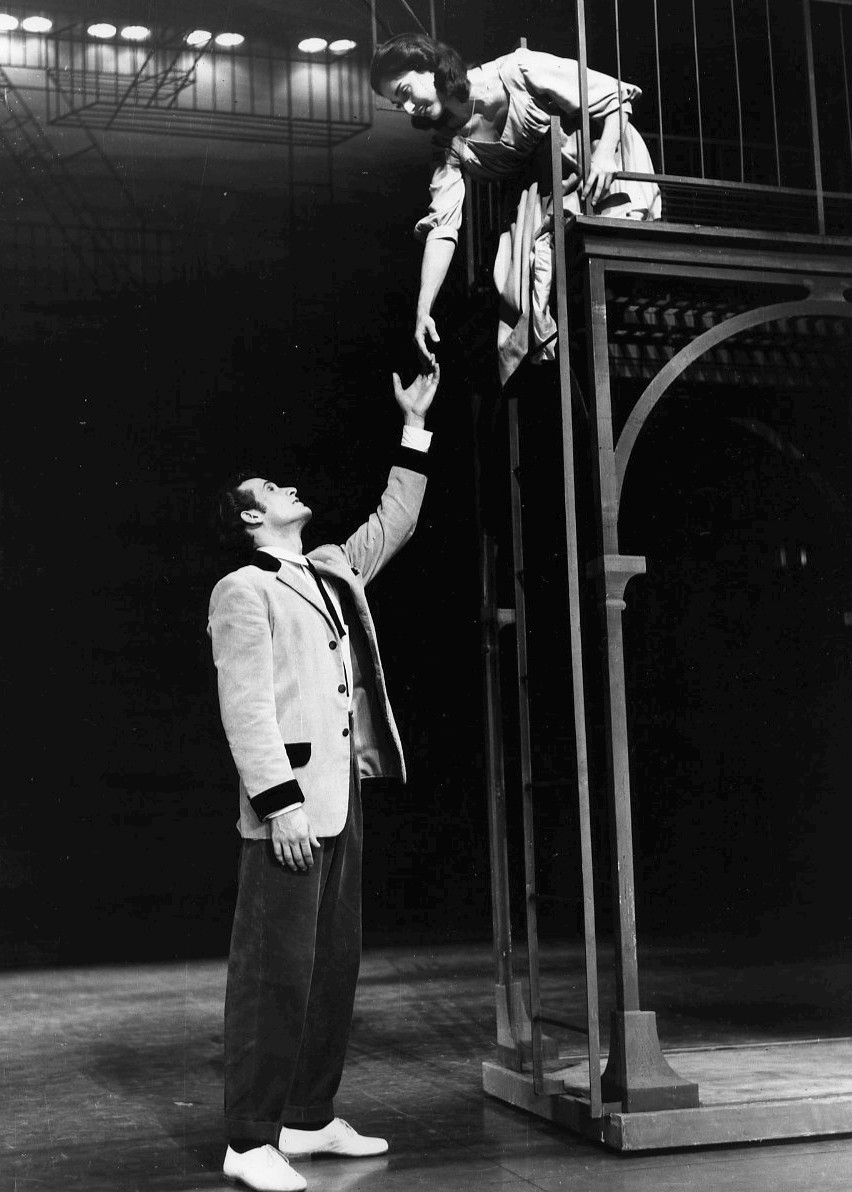
Larry Kert and Carol Lawrence in the balcony scene of West Side Story, original Broadway cast (1957)

In 1955, while dancing in the chorus in the Sammy Davis Jr. show Mr. Wonderful, Kert was recommended by his fellow dancer and friend Chita Rivera, who eventually won the role of Anita in West Side Story, to audition as a dancer for Gangway during the earliest Broadway pre-production of the Arthur Laurents-Leonard Bernstein-Stephen Sondheim musical later titled West Side Story, an adaptation of Romeo and Juliet set on the west side of mid-town Manhattan in the 1950s. Kert was the 18th out of 150 hopefuls to audition, but was the first one to be cut. A few months later, while he was working for Esquire in an advertising show, Stephen Sondheim approached him after seeing him perform and set up an audition for the part of Tony. Kert was reluctant to accept the offer, but a few weeks later, he was informed that he had the role.

According to Arthur Laurents, who wrote the book for West Side Story, Kert was "a California extrovert, laughing, bubbling, deadly funny, and openly gay." Director-choreographer Jerome Robbins frequently clashed with Kert, publicly chastising him for being a "faggot", despite the fact that Robbins himself, fellow dancer Tommy Abbott, and most of the creative team were gay. Kert did not repeat his role in the 1961 film version of the show because at 30 years old he could not have believably played a teenager. The role went to former child actor Richard Beymer, whose vocals were dubbed by Jimmy Bryant.

== Success and struggles ==
Kert's later career had only occasional high points. The Broadway musical A Family Affair limped along for three months in early 1962. He was a member of the cast of the infamous ill-fated musical version of Truman Capote's novella, Breakfast at Tiffany's, which closed during previews in December 1966. His next project, La Strada (1969), starring Bernadette Peters, closed on opening night. He often worked in Off-Broadway, theatre workshops, and taught dance. He also played the male lead, Cliff, as a replacement during the original Broadway run of Cabaret, taking over the part in December 1968 and remaining until the production closed in September 1969.

His next big break came as a replacement for Dean Jones as the lead in Stephen Sondheim's Company (1970). Soon after opening night, director Harold Prince released Jones from his contract and substituted Kert. The Tony Awards nominating committee allowed him to compete in the category of Best Actor in a Musical, though the rules normally restricted nominations to the performer who originated a role. The original cast album of Company had already been recorded before Kert joined the first cast. When the cast traveled to London to reprise their roles, Columbia Records recorded new tracks with Kert to substitute for those Jones had recorded. This recording with Kert was released as the Original London Cast recording. In 1998, when Sony Music, which had acquired the Columbia catalog, released a new digital version of the original Broadway cast recording, Kert's rendition of "Being Alive", the show's final number, was included as a bonus track. In 1972 Kert starred in a memorable Schaefer Beer commercial as a rookie driver whose impromptu rendition of the Schaefer jingle reduces the veterans to tears.

In 1977, he won the role of Liza Minnelli's leading man in "Happy Endings", a movie within the movie New York, New York. Kert hoped that his role as the producer, though small, would be his great movie breakthrough. But before New York, New York opened, United Artists, the distributor, insisted that it was too long and persuaded director Martin Scorsese to drop most of the 11-minute "Happy Endings" sequence from the final version, including all of Kert's scenes. In 1981, New York, New York was re-released with "Happy Endings" intact and Kert's role restored.

In 1975, he appeared in A Musical Jubilee, a revue that lasted barely three months. Rags (1986) closed two days after it opened. In his final show, Legs Diamond (1988), he was a standby for star Peter Allen. One of Kert's last recordings was the 1987 2-CD studio cast album of the complete scores of two George and Ira Gershwin musicals: Of Thee I Sing and its sequel Let 'Em Eat Cake. This was the first time these scores had been recorded in their entirety.

Kert made brief appearances in the feature films Gentlemen Prefer Blondes (1953) and New York, New York (1977). His television credits included guest appearances on The Sorcerer's Apprentice (Alfred Hitchcock Presents), Kraft Suspense Theatre, The Bell Telephone Hour, Combat! (Season 4 episode "One At A Time", aired 1966), Hawaii Five-O, Kojak: Conspiracy of Fear (1973), and Love, American Style. He also appeared several times on The Tonight Show Starring Johnny Carson. In (1988) Kert appeared for a Special Tribute to Broadway command performance at Ronald Reagan's White House, performing "Maria", "Tonite" and "Something's Coming" accompanied by Marvin Hamlisch.

== Death ==
Kert's last stage appearance came in a touring company of La Cage aux Folles but he missed performances because of illness. Kert died, at 60, in his Manhattan home of AIDS in 1991. Kert's longtime partner at the time of his death was Ron Pullen, though this did not become publicly known until after he died.

On October 11, 1992, Kert's ashes were among those scattered on the White House lawn as part of the AIDS Coalition to Unleash Power's "Ashes Action" protest.

== Stage credits ==
Year(s)	Production	Role	Notes
1950	Tickets, Please!	Performer	Broadway
1953	John Murray Anderson's Almanac	Ensemble	Broadway
1956–1957	Mr. Wonderful	Stagehand	Broadway
1957–1959	West Side Story	Tony	Broadway
1959–1960	West Side Story	Tony	US Tour
1960	West Side Story	Tony	Broadway
1962–1963	I Can Get It for You Wholesale	Harry Bogen	US Tour
1963	West Side Story	Tony	Regional
1966	Breakfast at Tiffany's	Carlos	Broadway
1968–1969	Cabaret	Clifford Bradshaw	Broadway
1969	La Strada	Mario	Broadway
1970–1972	Company	Robert	Broadway
1972	Company	Robert	West End
1973	Two Gentlemen of Verona	Proteus	Los Angeles Civic Light Opera
1973–1974	Two Gentlemen of Verona	Proteus	US Tour
1974	Sugar	Joe/Josephine	Los Angeles Civic Light Opera
1975	A Musical Jubilee	Performer	Broadway
1977–1978	Side by Side by Sondheim	Performer	Broadway
1978	Chicago	Billy Flynn	Butler University
1979–1980	Sugar	Joe/Josephine	US Tour
1982	Gigi	Gaston Lachailles	The Muny
1982	Anything Goes	Billy Crocker	The Muny
1983	A Little Night Music	Fredrik Egerman	Theatre Under the Stars
1984	Funny Girl	Nick Arnstein	The Muny
1984	Funny Girl	Nick Arnstein	Playhouse Square
1984	Funny Girl	Nick Arnstein	Cincinnati Music Hall
1984	Guys and Dolls	Sky Masterson	Paper Mill Playhouse
1985	The Music Man	Harold Hill	North Shore Music Theatre
1985	The Music Man	Harold Hill	Ogunquit Playhouse
1986	Rags	Nathan Hershkowitz	Broadway
1987–1988	La Cage aux Folles	Georges	US Tour

== Selected filmography ==
- Alfred Hitchcock Presents (1962) (Season 7 Episode 39: "The Sorcerer's Apprentice") as George
- Hawaii Five-O (1973) (Season 5 Episode 15 "Thanks for the Honeymoon") as Marty
