= Jimmy Bryant (singer) =

American singer, composer (1929–2022)

James Howard Bryant (June 2, 1929 – June 22, 2022) was an American singer, arranger and composer. He is best known for providing the singing voice of Tony (played onscreen by Richard Beymer) in the 1961 film musical West Side Story. While he received no screen credit, he states that Beymer was "a nice guy, and every time he did an interview he would mention my name." He also sang for James Fox in the 1967 film musical Thoroughly Modern Millie, and sang in "The Telephone Hour" number in Bye Bye Birdie. He also sang in the group that performed the theme song of the TV series Batman.

Bryant was born in Birmingham, Alabama, United States, and grew up in Tarrant, Alabama. He attended Birmingham–Southern College and the Birmingham Conservatory of Music before receiving a Scholarship in Composition at the New England Conservatory of Music in Boston, Massachusetts. He then moved to New York City in 1953, where he worked as a background singer. He later moved to Los Angeles and played bass in the house band at Puccini's, a Beverly Hills restaurant owned by Frank Sinatra.

His work as an orchestrator included the films Not with My Wife, You Don't!, Penelope and the television series Lost in Space. He also composed music heard at Walt Disney World and Tokyo Disneyland. Bryant also scored the music for numerous radio and television commercials for clients such as Lone Star beer, Tecate, Chrysler Imports, and Toyota Motor Cars.

Bryant died on June 22, 2022, at the age of 93.

He was a friend of Jimmy Bryant, the famous guitar player, with whom he is often confused.
