= Discography of West Side Story =

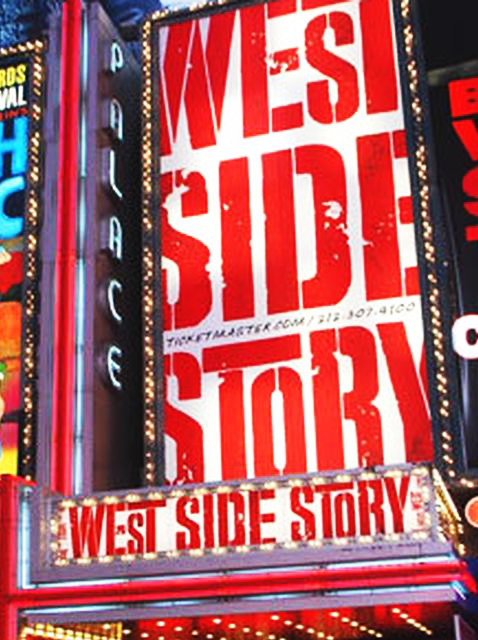
Marquee of the Palace Theatre during the run of the 2009 Broadway revival of West Side Story

West Side Story is a musical conceived by Jerome Robbins with music composed by Leonard Bernstein, lyrics by Stephen Sondheim, and a book by Arthur Laurents. Recordings of the musical include cast albums of the 1957 and 2009 Broadway productions and foreign productions sung in other languages, as well as live concert versions and studio albums. The 1958 West End production never released a cast album, but many of its stars recorded excerpts of the work across several recordings. Bernstein conducted the 1985 studio recording released by Deutsche Grammophon led by opera singers José Carreras and Kiri Te Kanawa. It won the Grammy Award for Best Cast Show Album in 1986, and a television documentary about the making of that album won the BAFTA Award for Best Documentary the same year. The 2009 cast album won the same Grammy award in 2010. A 2013 concert recording by the San Francisco Symphony was nominated for a Grammy Award.

West Side Story was adapted into films released in 1961 and 2021, and soundtrack albums were released for both movies. The musical's score has also been adapted by music arrangers and musical ensembles for albums over the decades. Bernstein arranged music from the show into a suite titled Symphonic Dances from West Side Story, which has been recorded several times. The 1961 jazz album Kenton's West Side Story, by Stan Kenton and the Stan Kenton Orchestra, won the 1962 Grammy Award for Best Large Jazz Ensemble Album.

== Recordings ==
=== Cast albums and live concert recordings ===
Year	Album	Tony Maria Anita Riff Bernardo Consuelo	Conductor	Label	Notes	References
1957	West Side Story, original Broadway cast	Larry Kert; Carol Lawrence; Chita Rivera; Michael Callan; Ken Leroy; Reri Grist	Max Goberman	Columbia Records	Broadway pit orchestra	
1968	ウェストサイド物語 (English: West Side Story)	Miyako Koshiro; Mari Yashiogi; Termi Fumizuki; Youko Natsumi; Junko Sasa; Natsumi Saya	Kazuaki Hashimoto	Express	Original Japanese Takarazuka cast	
1996	West Side Story Hoogtepunten Uit De Nederlandse Versie			Endemol/Dino Music	Dutch original cast	
1997	West Side Story Svensk Jubileumsversion	Petra Nielsen; Karl Dyall; Maria Rydberg; Martin Stenmarck; Richard Herrey; Dan Malmer; Per-Magnus Andersson	Jan Radesjö	Gazell	Swedish cast	
1997	West Side Story	Alena Antalová; Jana Musilová; Markéta Sedláčková; Petr Gazdík; Roman Vojtek		Multisonic	Original Czech cast	
2001	West Side Story (Tennessee Repertory Theater and Nashville Symphony concert cast)	Mike Eldred; Betsi Morrison; Marianne Cooke; Robert Dean; Michael San Giovanni; Winter Gabriel	Kenneth Schermerhorn; Nashville Symphony	Naxos Records		
2009	West Side Story: The New Broadway Cast Album	Matt Cavenaugh; Josefina Scaglione; Karen Olivo; Cody Green; George Akram; Danielle Polanco	Patrick Vaccariello	Sony Music	Winner of the Grammy Award for Best Musical Theater Album at the 52nd Annual Grammy Awards in 2010.	
2013	West Side Story (San Francisco Symphony concert recording)	Cheyenne Jackson; Alexandra Silber; Jessica Vosk; Kevin Vortmann; Kelly Markgraf; Louise Marie Cornillez	Michael Tilson Thomas; San Francisco Symphony	SFS Media	Nominated for the Grammy Award for Best Musical Theater Album at the 57th Annual Grammy Awards.	

=== Studio albums ===
Year	Album	Tony Maria Anita Riff Bernardo Consuelo	Conductor / orchestra	Label	Notes	References
1959	West Side Story	Bruce Trent; Lucille Graham; Mary Thomas; Joyce Berry; George Chakiris	Lawrence Leonard	Saga Records	Featuring the chorus and orchestra of the 1958 West End production, it did not feature the actors who played Maria, Anita, Tony, or Riff in the cast but did have some returning performers, such as Chakiris, and was led by the London production's conductor. It was later reissued in 1961 and 1966. In 2024 this recording was reissued by Stage Door Records in compilation with a separate 1959 excerpt recording of four songs from West Side Story with Don McKay (Tony) and Marlyn Watters (Maria) from the 1958 West End cast (see below); it was billed as the London Studio Recording.	
1985	Leonard Bernstein Conducts West Side Story	José Carreras; Kiri Te Kanawa; Tatiana Troyanos; Kurt Ollmann; Richard Harrell; Stella Zambalis	Leonard Bernstein	Deutsche Grammophon	Marilyn Horne performed the song "Somewhere" and was credited as the "off-stage" voice. The recording won the Grammy Award for Best Musical Theater Album at the 28th Annual Grammy Awards in 1986. The making of this album was the subject of the 1985 BBC One television documentary Leonard Bernstein: The Making of West Side Story which aired on the Omnibus program. It was the winner of the BAFTA Award for Best Documentary at the 39th British Academy Film Awards in 1986 and also aired on television in Italy, where it won the Prix Italia. It was also nominated for an Emmy in the category "Outstanding Classical Program in the Performing Arts".	
1993	West Side Story (Pickwick)	Michael Ball; Barbara Bonney; La Verne Williams; Christopher Howard; Michael Pearn; Lee Gibson	Barry Wordsworth	Pickwick Records	Recorded in London in 1993.	
1993	West Side Story (Orbis)	Paul Manuel; Tinuke Olafimihan; Caroline O'Connor; Nicholas Warnford; Nick Ferranti	John Owen Edwards; National Symphony Orchestra	Orbis Records; later re-released by TER/Jay Records	The first complete recording of the score. Recorded in 1993 in London, some of the performers on this recording reprised their roles from the 1984–1985 West End production at the Leicester Haymarket Theatre. Opera singer Sally Burgess is a performer on the recording in a minor role that she had portrayed early in her career in the West End.	
1995	West Side Story Versione Italiana		Richard Parrinello	Nuova Carisch	Italian studio cast	

=== Film soundtracks ===
Year	Album	Tony Maria Anita Riff Bernardo	Conductor	Label	Notes	References
1961	West Side Story (1961 soundtrack)	Richard Beymer; Natalie Wood; Rita Moreno; Tucker Smith; George Chakiris	Johnny Green	Columbia Masterworks Records	Soundtrack for the 1961 film adaptation which was co-directed by Robert Wise and Jerome Robbins. While Beymer, Wood and Moreno were credited as the singers for Tony, Maria and Anita, their voices were dubbed by ghost singers Jimmy Bryant (Tony), Marni Nixon (Maria) and, in some numbers, Betty Wand (Anita).	
2021	West Side Story (2021 soundtrack)	Ansel Elgort; Rachel Zegler; Ariana DeBose; Mike Faist; David Alvarez	Gustavo Dudamel	Hollywood Records	Soundtrack for the 2021 film adaptation which was directed by Steven Spielberg. Rita Moreno sings "Somewhere". It includes a version of "La Borinqueña", the official Puerto Rican anthem, sung by Alvarez and the Sharks.	

=== Excerpt recordings ===
Year	Album	Principal performers	Label	Notes	References
1958	The Sound of West Side Story	Sid Ramin and Irwin Kostal, conductors The Ramin-Kostal Orchestra; The Honey Dreamers	RCA Victor	This EP included four songs: "Maria", "Mambo", "Cool" and "Cool Fugue". It was led by Ramin and Kostal who were the original arrangers and orchestrators of the 1957 production. The Honey Dreamers were the vocalists. The manuscript for the score used is held in the Sid Ramin papers collection at the library of Columbia University.	
1959	West Side Story	Don McKay, tenor Marlys Watters, soprano Lawrence Leonard, conductor	His Master's Voice	Don McKay and Marlys Watters sing highlights from the roles of Tony and Maria. This EP of just four songs ("Maria", "Tonight", "One Hand, One Heart" and "I Feel Pretty") was made at the time that both performers were starring in those roles in the original West End production at Her Majesty's Theatre. It was later rereleased in 2024 in compilation with the 1959 London studio recording by Stage Door Records.	
1965	West Side Story / Och Stoppa Världen – Jag Vill Stiga Av! (English: West Side Story / Stop the World – I Want to Get Off)	Mats Olsson, conductor Towa Carson; Lars Lönndahl; Jan Malmsjö	RCA Camden	Swedish language excerpts from both West Side Story and Stop the World – I Want to Get Off. Songs from West Side Story include "Something's Coming", "Maria", "Tonight", "America" (instrumental only), "One Hand, One Heart", "I Feel Pretty" and "Gee, Officer Krupke". Carson sings the part of Maria and Lönndahl the part of Tony with the exception of the song "Something's Coming" which is sung by Malmsjö. "Gee, Officer Krupke" was reworked to predominantly feature Malmsjö as a soloist.	
1966	West Side Story / Porgy and Bess	Richard Müller-Lampertz, conductor Monika Dahlberg; Peter Beil	Philips Records	German language excerpts from both West Side Story and Porgy and Bess. Songs from West Side Story include "Gee, Officer Krupke", "Maria", "I Feel Pretty", "Something's Coming", "Tonight", "One Hand, One Heart", "Somewhere" and "America"	
1967	West Side Story / Mary Poppins	Heinz Geese, conductor Wolfgang Kieling; Peter Rubin; Wolfgang Anheisser; Ingeborg Hallstein; Heinz Hoppe	Polydor Limited	German language excerpts from both West Side Story and Mary Poppins. Songs from West Side Story include "Prologue", "Jet Song", "Maria", "I Feel Pretty, "Promenade", "Gee, Officer Krupke", "Jump", "Tonight, "Blues", "One Hand, One Heart", "Cool" and "America"	
1985	Höhepunkte aus West Side Story: Bernstein on Broadway (English: Highlights of West Side Story: Bernstein on Broadway)	Deborah Sasson, soprano Peter Hofmann, tenor	CBS Records	Marketed to a German audience; Michael Tilson Thomas conducted orchestras in Germany and California. Sasson sang the role of Maria and Hofmann sang Tony.	
1994	Somewhere – The Songs of Sondheim and Bernstein	Marina Prior, soprano Melbourne Symphony Orchestra	Sony Music Australia	This album is named for the song "Somewhere" and includes that song as well as several others from West Side Story along with other works by Bernstein and Sondheim.	
1994	Lost in Boston, vol. 1	Singers Judy Malloy, Richard Roland and Sal Viviano	Varèse Sarabande	This album contains the only recording of the song "Like Everybody Else"; written by Bernstein and Sondheim for West Side Story but which was cut from the show.	
1996	A Simple Song: Blackwell Sings Bernstein	Harolyn Blackwell, soprano	RCA Victor	Blackwell performs songs by Bernstein including a medley of songs from West Side Story with Vanessa Williams as Anita to her Maria. Blackwell portrayed Consuelo, was the understudy for Maria, and was the soloist who sang "Somewhere" in the 1980 Broadway revival of the musical.	
1996	The Songs of West Side Story		RCA Victor	"The Jet Song" sung by Brian Setzer; "Cool" sung by Patti Austin, Mervyn Warren, and Bruce Hornsby; "A Boy Like That" sung by Selena; "I feel Pretty" sung by Little Richard; two versions of "Somewhere" performed by Aretha Franklin and Phil Collins; "Tonight" sung by Wynonna Judd and Kenny Loggins; "America" sung by Patti LaBelle, Natalie Cole and Sheila E.; "I Have a Love" sung by Trisha Yearwood; and "Rumble" performed by Chick Corea Elektric Band and Steve Vai's Monsters.	
2007	West Side Story – 50th Anniversary recording	Hayley Westenra as Maria, Vittorio Grigolo as Tony, Connie Fisher for "Somewhere", Royal Liverpool Philharmonic, Nick Ingman	UCJ Music/Decca 173 3909	Liner notes by Jamie Bernstein; authorized by the Bernstein Foundation; nominated for the Grammy Award for Best Show Album.	
2007	A Place for Us	Kristin Chenoweth and Hugh Panaro in "Tonight", "Cool" piano solo by Eldar Djangirov (new recordings)	Masterworks Broadway	Previously recorded cover versions	

=== Jazz recordings ===
Year	Album	Principle performers	Label	Notes	References
1959	West Side Story (André Previn album)	André Previn, piano Shelly Manne, percussion Red Mitchell, bass	Contemporary Records	Eight songs from the musical are performed in an arrangement for jazz trio by Previn.	
1960	West Side Story (Cal Tjader album)	Cal Tjader, vibraphone Clare Fischer, piano, celeste and arranger	Fantasy Records	Vibraphohnist Cal Tjader leads a large jazz ensemble in performances of songs from West Side Story in arrangements by Clare Fischer. The album was re-released in 2002 as Cal Tjader Plays Harold Arlen & West Side Story (double CD).	
1961	Kenton's West Side Story	Stan Kenton and the Stan Kenton Orchestra	Capitol Records	Winner of the 1962 Grammy Award for Best Large Jazz Ensemble Album. Bernstein's music was adapted for Stan Kenton and his jazz ensemble by Johnny Richards.	
1962	West Side Story (Oscar Peterson Trio album)	Oscar Peterson, piano Ray Brown, double bass Ed Thigpen, drums	Verve Records	This jazz trio recording of the music used improvised arrangements created in the moment by the trio.	
1963	West Side Story Bossa Nova	Bill Barron, tenor saxophone Willie Thomas, trumpet Kenny Barron, piano Steve Kuhn, piano Kenny Burrell, guitar Skeeter Best, guitar Henry Grimes, double bass Charlie Persip, drums José Soares, percussion	Dauntless	Saxophonist Bill Barron leads a jazz ensemble in a bossa nova style arrangement of the score.	
1974	West Side Story (Earl Hines album)	Earl Hines, piano	Black Lion Records	The album was recorded live at the Montreux Jazz Festival in 1974. It featured Hines playing a medley of music from West Side Story, other music by Bernstein and selections from musical theatre works by other composers.	
1986	Music from West Side Story	Dave Brubeck, piano Paul Desmond, alto saxophone Eugene Wright, double bass Joe Morello, drums	Columbia Records	A compilation album, this record includes music from Brubeck's earlier album Bernstein Plays Brubeck Plays Bernstein (1961, Columbia Records), which devoted its Side B to the music of West Side Story as arranged and improvised by Brubeck and his ensemble.	

=== Symphonic Dances From West Side Story ===
Year	Album	Principle performers	Label	Notes	References
1961	Bernstein Conducts: Symphonic Dances from West Side Story / Symphonic Suite from On the Waterfront	Leonard Bernstein, conductor New York Philharmonic	Columbia Masterworks Records	First recording of Bernstein's Symphonic Dances from West Side Story; an orchestral suite Bernstein crafted from his music for West Side Story. It has since been recorded by many orchestras.	
1972	Symphonic Dances From West Side Story / Three Pieces For Blues Band And Orchestra	Seiji Ozawa, conductor Siegel–Schwall Band; San Francisco Symphony	Deutsche Grammophon		
1982	Symphonic Dances from West Side Story	Leonard Bernstein, conductor Los Angeles Philharmonic	Deutsche Grammophon		
