= Josefina Scaglione =

Argentinian musical theatre actress and singer

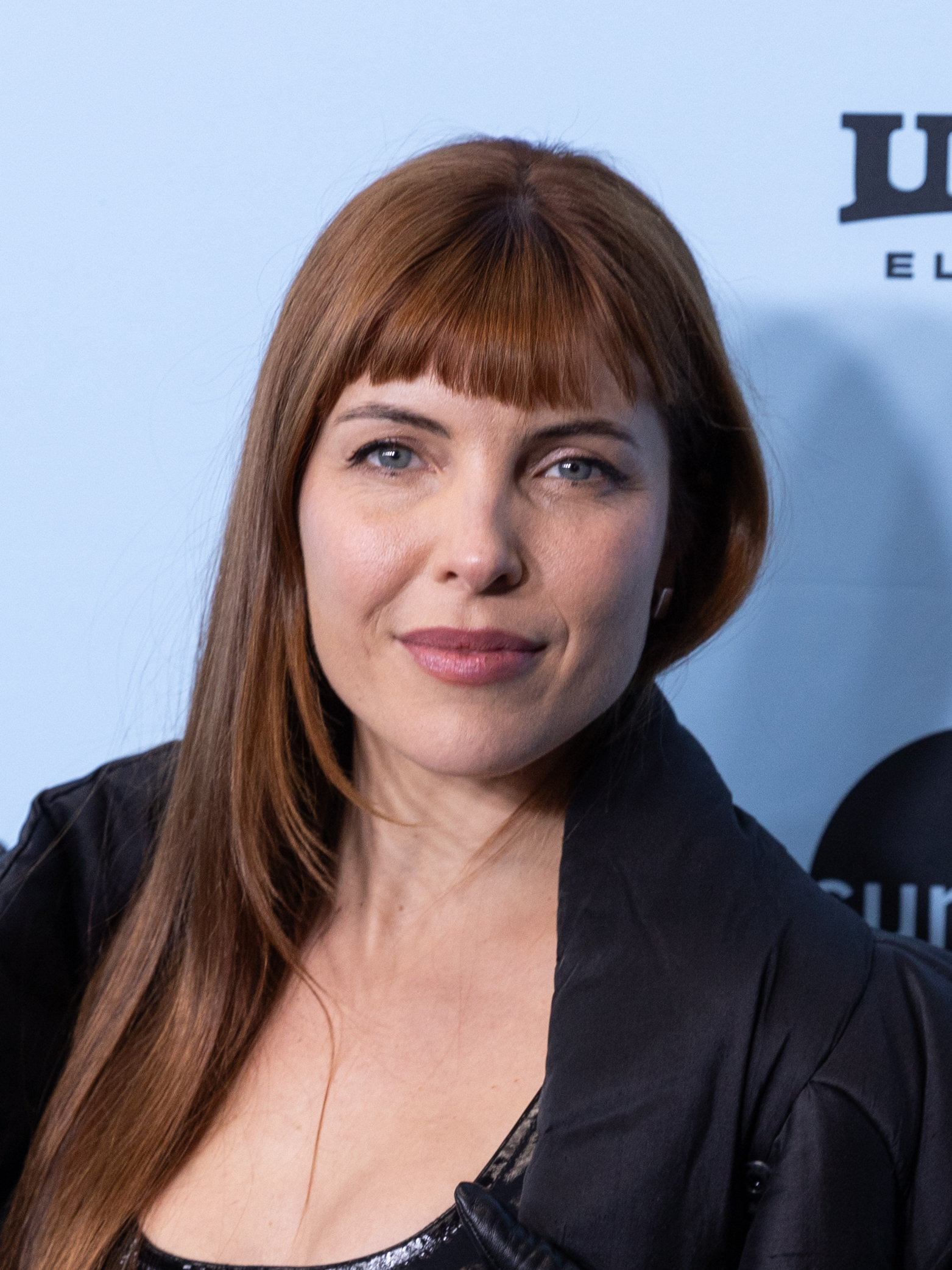
- Scaglione in 2025
- Born: 5 September 1987 (age 38); Trelew, Chubut, Argentina
- Occupations: Actress; singer
- Years active: 2007–present

Josefina Scaglione (born 5 September 1987) is an Argentine musical theatre actress and singer, best known for her performance as Maria in the 2009 Broadway revival of West Side Story, for which she received a Tony Award nomination for Best Leading Actress in a Musical.

== Biography ==
Scaglione was raised in Rosario, Santa Fe, and became interested in performing as a child. While in high school, she received a scholarship to attend a summer arts program at Point Park University in Pittsburgh, Pennsylvania. Upon graduating from high school, Scaglione moved to Buenos Aires and began working as a musical theatre actress. In Buenos Aires, she performed in Cinderella, and as Amber Von Tussle in Hairspray.

In 2008, director Arthur Laurents, unable to find an actress in the United States appropriate for the part of Maria in a Broadway revival of West Side Story, discovered Scaglione after friends in Buenos Aires directed him to a YouTube clip of her performing Ástor Piazzolla's composition Libertango. Laurents flew Scaglione to New York City to audition, where she immediately received the role, despite the fact that she was unknown in the United States. After performing as Maria at the National Theatre in Washington, DC, Scaglione made her Broadway debut in West Side Story at the Palace Theatre on March 19, 2009. As Maria, Scaglione won the Outer Critics Circle Award for Outstanding Actress in a Musical and a Theatre World Award, and was nominated for the Tony Award for Best Leading Actress in a Musical, becoming the first actress portraying Maria to receive a Lead Actress nomination (Carol Lawrence and Josie de Guzman each received nominations in the Featured Actress category for their portrayals of Maria in the original 1957 production and 1980 revival). She was in the Nickelodeon Latin American show Kally's Mashup as Professor Abrankhausen in 2017. She was recently on the USA network's "Fairly Legal" as singer Claudia Alves in the episode named "Force Majeure" as well.

She starred in the Spanish language production of “Waitress the Musical” (locally translated as Camarera) debuting in Buenos Aires, Argentina, at the Metropolitan Sura Theatre on April 17, 2019, featuring Josefina Scaglione as Jenna (translated to Gina).[58] The Spanish translation was done by Lily Ann Martin and Pablo del Campo.[59] The production closed on August 4, 2019.[60]
