= The Honey Dreamers =

The vocal group in 1947.

The Honey Dreamers were a vocal group in the 1950's who appeared on radio and early television programs such as CBS's Faye Emerson's Wonderful Town and The Ed Sullivan Show. The group was formed at St. Olaf College in 1946 by Keith Textor and his roommate Dick Larson, who introduced Keith to Sylvia Mikelson. Textor led the group and was responsible for the group's intricate harmonies. Their manager, at one point, was Art Ward.

== Personnel ==
Singers in the original lineup

- Keith Textor
- Sylvia Mikelson (later known as Sylvia Textor)
- Dick Larson
- Ardys Benson
- Paul Montan

Later lineups included

- Bob Davis
- Marion Bye
- Bob Mitchell
- Patty McGovern (formerly married to Leigh Kamman)
- Lew Anderson

Manager

- Art Ward

== Discography ==
Singles

- "Along the Navajo Trail"
- "And That Reminds Me" ( with Della Reese )
- "The Best Things in Life Are Free"
- "Can Anyone Explain? (No! No! No!)"
- "Down the Old Ox Road"
- "Give an Ordinary Fellow a Break"
- "Learnin' The Blues" (with Charlie Spivak)
- "Potato Bug Boogie"
- "Roll Along the Prairie Moon"N
- "Rootie Tootie Tootie" (The Kewtee Bear Song)
- "A Smile WIll Go A Long Long Way"
- "Something's Gotta Give" (with Charlie Spivak)
- "Sandy, The Soundman" (Sound effects by Bob Prescott)

Album

- An Evening with the Honeydreamers (LP)

Track Listing

1. Really Livin'
2. Back in Your Own Backyard
3. I've Got Sixpence
4. On the Sunny Side of the Street
5. It's a Good Day
6. Wrap Your Troubles in Dreams
7. True Kind O' Thinking
8. Just Around the Corner
9. When You're Smiling
10. Blue Skies
11. Feeling So Good Today
12. Best Things in Life Are Free
- A Child's Introduction to Jazz (with Bob Keeshan) (1958)

EP

- The Sound of West Side Story (1958, RCA Victor)
