= Variations in Blue =

Studio album by Bill Barron
- Released: 1984
- Recorded: August 23 & 24, 1983
- Studio: Jimmy Madison Studio, NYC
- Genre: Jazz
- Label: Muse; MR 5306
- Producer: Bill Barron

Bill Barron chronology
Jazz Caper (1978)	Variations in Blue (1984)	Compilation (1985)

Variations in Blue is an album by saxophonist Bill Barron which was recorded in 1983 and first released on the Muse label.

== Reception ==
Professional ratings
Review scores
Source	Rating
Allmusic	4/5 stars

In his review on Allmusic, Scott Yanow stated "Bill Barron, who spent much of his life as a music educator, played inventive solos that sounded both spontaneous and well thought-out. Barron, who was underrated throughout his career, cut three records for Muse during 1978–1987, of which this set was the second".

== Track listing ==
All compositions by Bill Barron except where noted.

1. "Variations in Blue" – 6:15
2. "September 1979" – 7:09
3. "Be Who You Are" – 7:03
4. "The Name of This Is" – 7:44
5. "Swingin' in Bushnell Park" – 9:10
6. "Minority" (Basheer Qusim) – 6:36

== Personnel ==
- Bill Barron – tenor saxophone
- Jimmy Owens – trumpet
- Kenny Barron – piano
- Ray Drummond – bass
- Ben Riley – drums
