= The Tenor Stylings of Bill Barron =

Studio album by Bill Barron
- Released: 1961
- Recorded: February 21, 1961
- Studio: Medallion Studios, Newark, NJ
- Genre: Jazz
- Label: Savoy; MG-12160
- Producer: Herman Lubinsky

Bill Barron chronology
The Tenor Stylings of Bill Barron (1961)	Modern Windows (1961)

The Tenor Stylings of Bill Barron is the debut album by saxophonist Bill Barron which was recorded in 1961 and first released on the Savoy label. The album was reissued on CD combined with Modern Windows in 2000.

== Reception ==
Professional ratings
Review scores
Source	Rating
Allmusic	4/5 stars

In his review on Allmusic, Michael G. Nastos called stated "This recording displays all the why's and wherefore's as to his unsung greatness, showcasing his clever compositions and his clear, distinct, definite tenor tone that holds allegiance to no peer or predecessor" All About Jazz noted "The Tenor Stylings Of Bill Barron somehow was engineered for sharper and more assertive sound reproduction, clarifying the roles of the instruments within each piece. Furthermore, the compositions on the album are based upon single themes for the most part".

== Track listing ==
All compositions by Bill Barron

1. "Blast Off" – 9:37
2. "Ode to an Earth Girl" – 7:33
3. "Fox Hunt" – 7:07
4. "Oriental Impressions" – 6:24
5. "Back Lash" – 5:47
6. "Nebulae" – 6:18
7. "Desolation" – 5:21 Bonus track on reissue

== Personnel ==
- Bill Barron – tenor saxophone
- Ted Curson – trumpet
- Kenny Barron – piano
- Jimmy Garrison – bass
- Frankie Dunlop – drums
