= West Side Story Bossa Nova =

Studio album by Bill Barron Orchestra
- Released: 1963
- Recorded: March 24, 27 & 28, 1963
- Studio: Gotham Studios, Newark, NYC
- Genre: Jazz
- Label: Dauntless; DM 4312/DS 6312
- Producer: Tom Wilson

Bill Barron chronology
Bossa Nova: The New Sound in Jazz from South America (1962)	West Side Story Bossa Nova (1963)	A Swedish-American Venture (1966)

West Side Story Bossa Nova is an album by saxophonist Bill Barron featuring bossa nova versions of tunes from the Leonard Bernstein and Stephen Sondheim musical West Side Story which was recorded in 1963 and first released on the Dauntlesss label.

== Reception ==
Professional ratings
Review scores
Source	Rating
Allmusic	4/5 stars
The Penguin Guide to Jazz Recordings	2.5/4 stars

In his review on Allmusic, Ken Dryden states "The tenor saxophonist's orchestra is actually only a septet, but it's a potent group who puts out a big sound ... Barron's arrangements are brief (all under four minutes each), but very enjoyable, with snappy takes of "Cool" and "America" as well as a brief "Maria," featuring Thomas and Barron swapping solos, and wrapping with an unusually upbeat treatment of the normally low-key ballad "Somewhere." "

== Track listing ==
All compositions by Leonard Bernstein and Stephen Sondheim

1. "Something's Coming" – 3:15
2. "One Hand, One Heart" – 3:29
3. "Gee, Officer Krupke" – 3:57
4. "Cool" – 3:55
5. "Maria" – 2:19
6. "Tonight" – 3:21
7. "America" – 3:32
8. "I Feel Pretty" – 3:42
9. "Jet Song" – 3:16
10. "Somewhere" – 3:53

Note

- Recorded at Gotham Studios in New York City on March 24, 1963 (tracks 1, 5 & 9), March 27, 1963 (tracks 4, 8 & 10) and March 28, 1963 (tracks 2, 3, 6 & 7)

== Personnel ==
- Bill Barron – tenor saxophone (all tracks)
- Willie Thomas – trumpet (all tracks)
- Kenny Barron – piano (tracks 1, 5, 9)
- Steve Kuhn – piano (tracks 2–4, 6–8, 10)
- Kenny Burrell – guitar (tracks 1–3, 5–7, 9)
- Skeeter Best – guitar (tracks 4, 8, 10)
- Henry Grimes – bass (all tracks)
- Charlie Persip – drums (all tracks)
- José Soares – percussion (all tracks)
