= Pre-Bird =

Studio album by Charles Mingus
- Released: September 1961
- Recorded: May 24–25, 1960
- Studios: Plaza Sound Studios, NY
- Genre: Jazz
- Length: 35:20
- Labels: Mercury (1961); Limelight (1965, as Mingus Revisited)
- Producer: Leonard Feather

Charles Mingus chronology
Charles Mingus Presents Charles Mingus (1961)	Pre-Bird (1961)	Mingus (1961)

Professional ratings
Review scores
Source	Rating
The Penguin Guide to Jazz Recordings	3/4 stars
The Rolling Stone Jazz Record Guide	5/5 stars

Pre-Bird (later re-released as Mingus Revisited) is an album by the jazz bassist and composer Charles Mingus consisting of music that was composed before Mingus first heard Charlie Parker, hence the title Pre-Bird. It was released on Mercury Records in September 1961.

== Recording ==
The album was recorded over May 24–25, 1960 at Plaza Sound Studios in New York City. Tracks 4, 7, and 8 were recorded on the 24th, with tracks 1–3, 5, and 6 recorded the following day.

The album includes two tracks which feature contrapuntal arrangements of swing era pieces, aided by stereo mixing. In the first, "Take the "A" Train" is played in the left channel, paired with "Exactly Like You" in the right channel. The same is done with "Do Nothin' Till You Hear From Me" and "I Let a Song Go Out of My Heart".

== Track listing ==
All tracks are written by Charles Mingus (except where noted).

No.	Title	Lyrics	Music	Length
1.	"Take The 'A' Train"/"Exactly Like You"	Dorothy Fields ("Exactly")	Billy Strayhorn/Jimmy McHugh	3:34
2.	"Prayer For Passive Resistance"			3:49
3.	"Eclipse"			3:45
4.	"Mingus Fingus No. 2"			3:22
5.	"Weird Nightmare"			3:35
6.	"Do Nothin' Till You Hear From Me"/"I Let a Song Go Out of My Heart"	Bob Russell/Irving Mills, Henry Nemo, John Redmond	Duke Ellington (all)	3:33
7.	"Bemoanable Lady"			4:22
8.	"Half-Mast Inhibition"			8:12

== Personnel ==
Personnel via MusicBrainz.

- Charles Mingus – double bass
- Marcus Belgrave, Ted Curson, Hobart Dotson, Clark Terry, and Richard Williams – trumpets
- Eddie Bert, Charles "Majeed" Greenlee, Slide Hampton, and Jimmy Knepper – trombones
- Danny Bank, Bill Barron, Booker Ervin, Joe Farrell, and John LaPorta – saxophones
- Eric Dolphy – alto saxophone, flute
- Yusuf Lateef – saxophone, flute
- Robert Di Domenica – flute
- Harry Shulman – oboe
- Lorraine Cusson – vocals (tracks 3, 5)
- Paul Bley and Roland Hanna – pianos
- Sticks Evans, Dannie Richmond and George Scott – drums
- Leonard Feather – production, liner notes
- Gunther Schuller – conductor
