= Hot Line (album) =

Studio album by Bill Barron
- Released: 1964
- Recorded: March 31, 1962
- Studio: Medallion Studios, Newark, NJ
- Genre: Jazz
- Label: Savoy; MG-12183

Bill Barron chronology
Modern Windows (1961)	Hot Line (1964)	Bossa Nova: The New Sound in Jazz from South America (1962)

Hot Line (subtitled The Tenor of Bill Barron) is an album by saxophonist Bill Barron which was recorded in 1962 and first released on the Savoy label. The album was also rereleased as The Hot Line under Booker Ervin's co-leadership.

== Reception ==
Professional ratings
Review scores
Source	Rating
Allmusic	4/5 stars

In his review on Allmusic, Scott Yanow called it a "fine release" stating "Barron's five advanced originals alternate with three standards that give the two tenors an opportunity to display their contrasting but complementary inside/outside styles"

== Track listing ==
All compositions by Bill Barron except where noted.

1. "Bill's Boogie" – 6:50
2. "Groovin'" – 6:08
3. "Now's the Time" (Charlie Parker) – 9:05
4. "A Cool One" – 4:37
5. "Jelly Roll" – 4:49
6. "Playhouse March" (Ted Curson) – 5:23
7. "Billie's Bounce" (Parker) – 3:04 Bonus track on reissue
8. "Work Song" (Nat Adderley) – 5:03

== Personnel ==
- Bill Barron, Booker Ervin – tenor saxophone
- Kenny Barron – piano
- Larry Ridley – bass
- Andrew Cyrille – drums
