= Willie Thomas (trumpeter) =

- Born: February 13, 1931
- Died: February 16, 2019 (aged 88) Olga, Washington, U.S.
- Genre: Jazz
- Occupations: musician, jazz educator
- Instrument: Trumpet (Besson tilt-bell)
- Years active: 1945-present
- Labels: Mark, Vee-Jay, Atlantic
- Spouses: Valerie Sanson; Jerri Winters; Barbara Meyer
- Website: https://www.jazzeveryone.com

Willie Thomas (February 13, 1931 – February 16, 2019) was an American jazz trumpeter, author and educator.

== Biography ==
Willie Thomas was raised in Orlando, Florida and started playing the trumpet around the age of 10.

In the 1950s, Willie was a member of the Third Army Band, where he met and played with pianist Wynton Kelly, which became his first real break into the New York jazz scene.

In his 45 years as a jazz trumpeter, Thomas has performed or recorded with many jazz greats including the MJT+3 with Frank Strozier and Bob Cranshaw, the Slide Hampton Octet with Freddie Hubbard and George Coleman, the Woody Herman Orchestra, the Al Belletto Sextet, and singer Peggy Lee.

Thomas created the series of jazz educational books Jazz Anyone...?. He has also an active member of the International Association for Jazz Education and was inducted into the International Association of Jazz Educators' Jazz Education Hall of Fame in 1994.

== Personal life and death ==
Thomas married 3 times, to Barbara Meyer, Jerri Winters (with whom he performed during her singing career in the Al Belletto Sextet as the trumpet player), and Valerie Sanson. He had two children: daughters Wendy Thomas and Mary Rainer.

Willie Thomas died at his cabin in Olga, Washington on February 16, 2019, three days after his 88th birthday. He was survived by his former wife, Jerri Winters, as well as his children and son-in-law Oliver Groenewald.

== Selected discography ==
=== As leader ===
- Discover Jazz - Live! At The 1982 NAJE Convention (1982, Mark) - with Bunky Green, and featuring Nick Brignola, Frank Pazzullo, Larry Green (bassist), Arch Martin, and Warrick Carter
- In Love Again (1987, Mark) - with Bunky Green

=== As sideman ===
With Woody Herman and Tito Puente

- Herman's Heat & Puente's Beat (1958, Everest)

With Slide Hampton

- Sister Salvation / Somethin' Sanctified / Live at Birdland (1960, 1961, Atlantic Records/Fresh Sound)
- Two Sides of Slide (1961, Charlie Parker Records) (as William Thomas)
- Jazz with a Twist (1962, Atlantic Records)

With MJT+3

- MJT+3 (Vee-Jay Records) with Frank Strozier, Harold Mabern, Bob Cranshaw, and Walter Perkins
- Make Everybody Happy (1961, Vee-Jay Records)

With Peggy Lee

- Basin Street East Proudly Presents Miss Peggy Lee (1961, Capitol Records)

With Bill Henderson

- His complete Vee-Jay Recordings Vol. 1 (1993, Vee-Jay Records/Koch Jazz)

With Bill Barron

- West Side Story Bossa Nova (1963, Dauntless)

== Books ==
The Jazz Anyone.....? series, published by Alfred Music:

- Jazz Anyone.....?, Bk 1: Play and Learn (B Flat Tenor Sax Edition)
- Jazz Anyone.....?, Bk 1: Play and Learn (E-Flat Instruments) (Book & 2 CDs)
- Jazz Anyone.....?, Bk 1: Play and Learn (Teacher Edition) (Book & 3 CDs)
- Jazz Anyone.....?, Vol 1: Play and Learn Jazz Combo Collection (Easy)
- Jazz Anyone.....?, Bk 2: Play and Learn Blues and More (Bass Edition) (Book & 2 CDs)
- Jazz Anyone.....?, Bk 2: Play and Learn Blues and More (Teacher Edition) (Book & 2 CDs)
- Jazz Anyone.....?, Bk 3: Making Music -- A Simple Language System for Jazz (Teacher Edition) (Book & 2 CDs)
- Jazz Anyone.....?, Bk 3: Making Music -- A Simple Language System for Jazz (E-Flat Instruments) (Book & 2 CDs)
- Jazz Anyone.....? Rhythm Manual
- Funtime Blues Pack (Student's Book) (A Jazz Curriculum for K-6)
