= Modern Windows =

Studio album by Bill Barron
- Released: 1962
- Recorded: June 5, 1961
- Studio: Medallion Studios, Newark, NJ
- Genre: Jazz
- Label: Savoy; MG-12163
- Producer: Herman Lubinsky

Bill Barron chronology
The Tenor Stylings of Bill Barron (1961)	Modern Windows (1962)	Hot Line (1962)

Modern Windows (subtitled A Jazz Suite from the New "Soul" by Bill Barron) is an album by saxophonist Bill Barron which was recorded in 1961 and first released on the Savoy label. The album was reissued on CD combined with The Tenor Stylings of Bill Barron in 2000.

== Reception ==
Professional ratings
Review scores
Source	Rating
Allmusic	4/5 stars
The Penguin Guide to Jazz Recordings	3.5/4 stars

In his review on Allmusic, Michael G. Nastos called stated "This is a rich, fulfilling modern jazz window into the soul of one of the most underappreciated masters of the idiom, and is clearly Bill Barron's best work in his criminally miniscule [sic] discography." All About Jazz noted "A part of the creative Philadelphia jazz scene of his generation, along with many other better-known artists, Bill Barron for too long has been overlooked as an innovator and contributor to the music. The Savoy re-issues may allow a new generation to recognize Bill Barron as one of the quieter but nevertheless valued sounds from that pivotal time".

== Track listing ==
All compositions by Bill Barron

1. "Modern Windows Suite: Men at Work" – 6:43
2. "Modern Windows Suite: Tone Colors" – 7:30
3. "Modern Windows Suite: Dedication to Wanda" – 4:09
4. "Modern Windows Suite: Keystone" – 6:23
5. "Noodlin'" – 5:49
6. "Duality" – 6:53
7. "Self Portrait" – 4:23
8. "Persian Street Scene" – 3:58

== Personnel ==
- Bill Barron – tenor saxophone
- Ted Curson – trumpet
- Jay Cameron – baritone saxophone
- Kenny Barron – piano
- Eddie Kahn – bass
- Pete La Roca – drums
