= The Arbors =

American vocal group

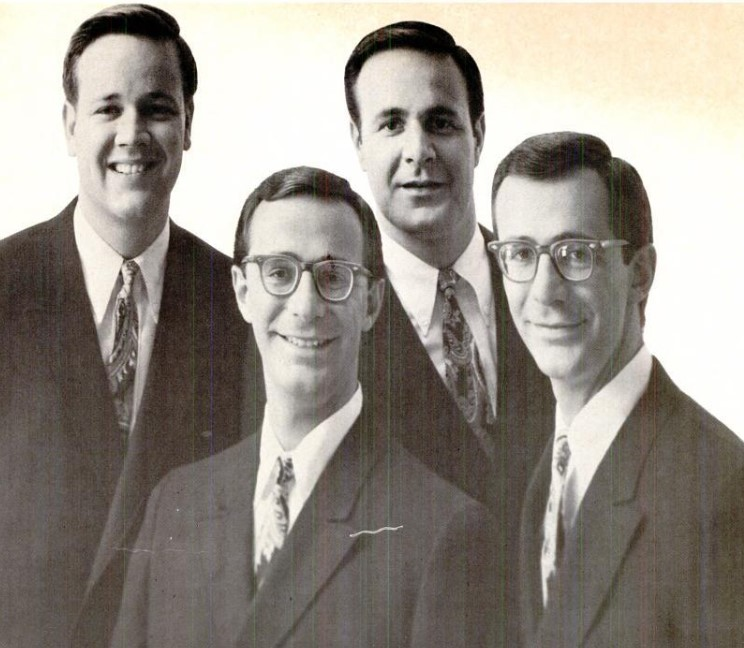
The Arbors in 1966

The Arbors were an American pop vocal group formed in 1964 in Ann Arbor, Michigan. The members, two sets of brothers, met at the University of Michigan-Ann Arbor, and began playing local shows in Michigan before moving to New York City. They recorded a single for Mercury Records which garnered little attention, but their next single, "A Symphony for Susan" (recorded for Carney Records), was reissued nationally on Columbia Records subsidiary, Date Records and hit No. 51 on the US chart; they followed with the singles "Just Let it Happen" and Graduation Day (US No. 59).

In 1968, they recorded the song "Valley of the Dolls", written for (but not actually used in) the movie of the same name. Despite an endorsement from the original book's author Jacqueline Susann, the Arbors' tune was overshadowed by Dory Previn's title song from the movie and was not a national hit (it did manage to make the top ten at WAAM radio back in Ann Arbor). They bounced back with a 1969 version of "The Letter", which had been a hit two years before for The Box Tops. The cover became their biggest hit, reaching No. 20 on the US singles chart, and they followed it with the release of an album that included their interpretations of Bob Dylan's "Like a Rolling Stone", The Doors' "Touch Me", Blood, Sweat & Tears' "I Can't Quit Her" (US No. 67), and Simon & Garfunkel's "For Emily, Whenever I May Find Her". It was the group's last recording for Columbia, and afterward, they began writing and playing music for commercials, and continued to do so for some 30 years thereafter.

== Personnel ==
Vocalists

- Tom Herrick
- Scott Herrick (born Paul Scott Herrick, 1937 – November 7, 2018; died at his home in Ajijic, Jalisco, Mexico, after suffering a stroke)
- Edward "Ed" Farran (June 17, 1937 – January 2, 2003; died of kidney failure, at the age of 65)
- Frederick "Fred" Farran (June 17, 1937 – August 29, 2011; died after a bout of pneumonia, at the age of 74)

The Farran brothers were identical twins.

Manager

- Art Ward

== Discography ==
=== Albums ===
- A Symphony for Susan (Date Records, 1967) US No. 144
- The Arbors (Date Records, 1968)
- Featuring: I Can't Quit Her - The Letter (Columbia Records, 1969)

Track listing

Side one
No.	Title	Writer(s)	Length
1.	"Motet - Overture"	Joe Scott	2:33
2.	"The Letter"	Wayne Carson Thompson	3:32
3.	"Good Day Sunshine/Got to Get You into My Life"	John Lennon; Paul McCartney	3:16
4.	"Lovin' Tonight (Maybe Tonight)"	Jet Loring; Joe Scott	3:04
5.	"Like a Rolling Stone"	Bob Dylan	3:37

Side two
No.	Title	Writer(s)	Length
1.	"I Can't Quit Her/For Emily, Whenever I May Find Her"	Al Kooper; Irwin Levine; Paul Simon	3:16
2.	"Most of All"	Alan Freed; Harvey Fuqua	3:17
3.	"Mr. Bus Driver"	Wayne Carson Thompson	3:24
4.	"Touch Me"	Robby Krieger	2:38
5.	"Hey Joe"	Billy Roberts	5:49

- The Arbors (Arbors Music/No Label, 1977)
- So Fine (Arbors Music/No Label, 1978)
  Side One
  No.	Title	Writer(s)	Length
  1.	"Not for Dancin'"	Alan Barcus	4:05
  2.	"Waltz"	Les Hooper	2:00
  3.	"Time Was"	Paul Wilson	3:33
  4.	"'Round Midnight"	Bob James	2:40
  5.	"If"	Bobby Schiff	3:02
  No.	Title	Writer(s)	Length
  1.	"Answer Me"	Sy Mann	2:44
  2.	"So Fine"	Steve Samler	3:11
  3.	"Mirage"	Alan Barcus	3:25
  4.	"Here Comes Inspiration"	Paul Wilson	2:43
  5.	"How Are Things In GloccaMorra"	Lew Anderson	2:21
  6.	"If You Walked Away"	Alan Barcus	3:39

== See also ==
- List of sibling groups
