= The Next Plateau =

Studio album by Bill Barron
- Released: 1989
- Recorded: March 20, 1987
- Studio: Garden Productions NYC
- Genre: Jazz
- Length: 41:37
- Label: Muse; MR 5368
- Producer: Bill Barron

Bill Barron chronology
Live at Cobi's 2 (1985)	The Next Plateau (1989)	Live at Cobi's (1988)

The Next Plateau is an album by saxophonist Bill Barron which was recorded in 1987 and first released on the Muse label.

== Reception ==
Professional ratings
Review scores
Source	Rating
Allmusic	4/5 stars

In his review on Allmusic, Scott Yanow called it "a consistently stimulating advanced post-bop outing, one of Bill Barron's finest recordings"

== Track listing ==
All compositions by Bill Barron except where noted.

1. "This One's for Monk" – 6:57
2. "Yes, No, Maybe So" – 8:44
3. "Ballad for My Love" – 5:00
4. "Easy Does It" – 7:12
5. "Travelin' on the Freeway" – 6:52
6. "Row House" (Kenny Barron) – 6:52

== Personnel ==
- Bill Barron – tenor saxophone, soprano saxophone
- Kenny Barron – piano
- Ray Drummond – bass
- Ben Riley – drums
