= Live at Cobi's =

Live album by Bill Barron Quartet
- Released: February 15, 2005
- Recorded: October 24, 1987 and March 4, 1988
- Venue: Cobi's Place, NYC
- Genre: Jazz
- Length: 70:16
- Label: SteepleChase; SCCD 31570
- Producer: Nils Winther

Bill Barron chronology
The Next Plateau (1987)	Live at Cobi's (2005)	Higher Ground (1989)

Live at Cobi's is a live album by saxophonist Bill Barron which was recorded in 1987 and 1988 and released posthumously on the SteepleChase label in 2005.

== Reception ==
In JazzTimes Chris Kelsey wrote "Straightahead tenor players who regularly stretch themselves and break a sweat in the process are too few and far between these days. That’s what makes a record by someone like the late Bill Barron so attractive. Barron had no such problems cutting loose. He possessed an original voice-not revolutionary, but unique in its way".

== Track listing ==
All compositions by Bill Barron except where noted.

1. "This One's for Monk" – 13:07
2. "Easy Does It" – 12:18
3. "Confirmation" (Charlie Parker) – 10:56
4. "Row House" (Kenny Barron) – 9:47
5. "Angel Eyes" (Matt Dennis, Earl Brent) – 5:55
6. "Voyage" (Kenny Barron) – 8:45
7. "Until Further Notice" – 9:23

== Personnel ==
- Bill Barron – tenor saxophone
- Fred Simmons – piano
- Santi Debriano – bass
- Ben Riley – drums
