= Art Ward =

Art Ward (né Arthur Downs Ward; June 14, 1922 – January 29, 2002) was an American music industry entrepreneur who, among other things was a co-owner of A & R Recording, Inc., where he had served a president.

Ward was born in Maryland. Before his involvement with A & R Recording, he was Manager (from 1948 to 1953) of the Honey Dreamers, a popular vocal quintet, and the Arbors, a popular vocal quartet. He had also been director of public relations for Vitacoustic Records from September 1947 to March 1948 and a radio announcer for WBOC.

He died, aged 79, in Queens, New York, in January 2002.
