= Music from West Side Story =

Studio album by Dave Brubeck
- Released: 1986
- Recorded: 1960–1965
- Genre: Jazz
- Length: 41:56
- Label: Columbia - CK40455

Music from West Side Story is a 1986 compilation album by Dave Brubeck and his quartet of music from Leonard Bernstein and Stephen Sondheim musical West Side Story, with other tracks taken from Brubeck's albums Bernstein Plays Brubeck Plays Bernstein (1960) and Anything Goes: The Music of Cole Porter (1966) and My Favorite Things (1965).

== Reception ==
Professional ratings
Review scores
Source	Rating
Allmusic	3.5/5 stars

The album was reviewed by Bruce Eder at AllMusic, who wrote that it was "one of the more often overlooked albums" in Brubeck's Columbia catalog and described it as "a lot of fun and well worth hearing ... [the whole record] swings in some unexpected directions that still delight four-plus decades later."

== Track listing ==
1. "Maria" (Leonard Bernstein, Stephen Sondheim) - 3:15
2. "I Feel Pretty" (Bernstein, Sondheim) - 5:07
3. "Somewhere" (Bernstein, Sondheim) - 4:14
4. "A Quiet Girl" (Bernstein, Betty Comden, Adolph Green) - 2:21
5. "Tonight" (Bernstein, Sondheim) - 3:46
6. "What Is This Thing Called Love?" (Cole Porter) - 6:15
7. "The Most Beautiful Girl in the World" (Lorenz Hart, Richard Rodgers) - 5:16
8. "Night and Day" (Porter) - 4:54
9. "My Romance" (Hart, Rodgers) - 6:48

== Personnel ==
- Dave Brubeck - piano
- Paul Desmond - alto saxophone
- Eugene Wright - double bass
- Joe Morello - drums

Production

- Michael Berniker - CD Preparation
- Steve Byram - design
- Tim Geelan - engineer
- Warren Linn - illustrations
- Ambrose Reynolds - liner notes
- Teo Macero - producer
