= Jazz Caper =

Studio album by Bill Barron
- Released: 1982
- Recorded: August 1978
- Studio: Generation Sound Studios, NYC
- Genre: Jazz
- Label: Muse; MR 5235
- Producer: Bill Barron

Bill Barron chronology
Motivation (1972)	Jazz Caper (1982)	Variations in Blue (1983)

Jazz Caper is an album by saxophonist Bill Barron which was recorded in 1978 and first released on the Muse label in 1982.

== Reception ==
Professional ratings
Review scores
Source	Rating
Allmusic	3/5 stars

In his review on Allmusic, Scott Yanow called it "Intriguing music that rewards repeated listenings"

== Track listing ==
All compositions by Bill Barron except where noted.

1. "Jazz Caper" – 7:25
2. "Spring Thing" – 7:25
3. "Until Further Notice" – 5:31
4. "New Love" (Bill Barron, J. Jarrett) – 4:03
5. "One For Bird" – 8:09
6. "Hoppin' and Skippin'" – 6:08
7. "Flip Flop" – 6:41

== Personnel ==
- Bill Barron – tenor saxophone, soprano saxophone
- Jimmy Owens – trumpet
- Kenny Barron – piano
- Buster Williams – bass
- Ed Blackwell – drums
