= Jerri Winters =

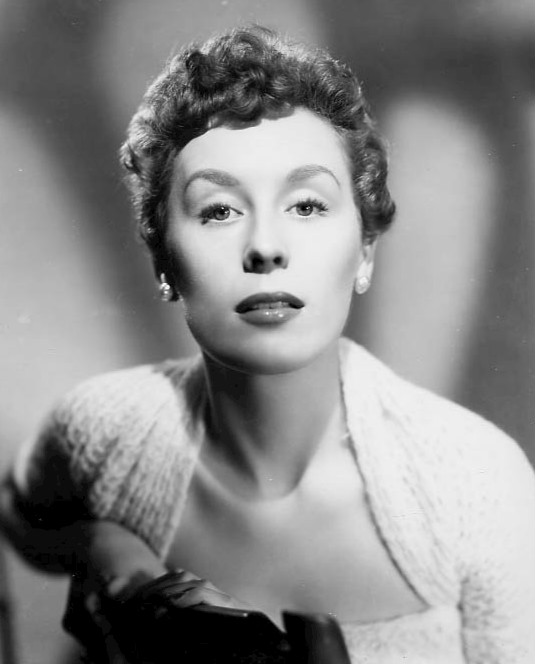
- Winters in 1952
- Born: circa 1930; Terre Haute, Indiana
- Occupation: Jazz singer
- Spouse: Willie Thomas (divorced)

Jerri Winters (born c.1930) is an American jazz singer. She is most known for her partnership with Stan Kenton's orchestra from February 15 until June 15, 1952, recording several titles for Capitol Records, including "Adios," "All Because of You," and "She's a Comely Wench." Winters released several solo albums, including Winter's Here in 1955 on Fraternity Records (the first recording to be released by that label), Somebody Loves Me in 1957 on Bethlehem Records, and Winters Again in 1962.

== Early life ==
Jerri Winters was born circa 1930 in Terre Haute, Indiana, a town once known for its vibrant jazz scene during the 1930s and 1940s. Active since the 1920s, it introduced locals to new styles of popular music.

== Career ==
Winters began her career in 1948 when she won top honors in Horace Heidt's Youth Opportunity Program, a national radio talent contest broadcast on NBC that scouted young performers for prizes and professional opportunities. Each person who performed their own song would win $5000 and a chance to tour as a singer with Horace Heidt's band. Jerri won first prize and went on tour with Horace across the country, projecting her into the spotlight. Later, she moved to Chicago, where she worked as a model and a dance instructor at Arthur Murray’s dance studio and performing at various nightclubs, allowing her to develop her vocal technique and phrasing, which were akin to other famous jazz vocalists such as Anita O'Day. She auditioned for multiple bands in order to become the star vocalist as she continued to develop her singing ability which gained a "husky" quality and in 1952, she was chosen to join Stan Kenton's band on a program sponsored by disk jockey Gene Norman. She joined Stan Kenton's band later that year with bandleader Kenton looking for a new vocalist to replace June Christy in his band. Having developed her tenure at various Chicago nightclubs, Winters was an easy pick for vocalist. Her first major performance with the band debuted at the Oasis nightclub in Los Angeles on February 25. She stayed with Kenton's orchestra from February to June 1952. Her vocal style was praised by many as a "good fit" for Kenton's innovative sound, following in the shadows of singers such as Anita O'Day and June Christy. She toured with Kenton's band, performing at various venues. Winters and the Al Belletto Sextet also performed with the Woody Herman Orchestra on the 1958 television program "Big Record", hosted by Patti Page. The group sang "Stars Fell on Alabama". Following her brief tenure with Stan Kenton's orchestra, Winters transitioned to solo work by establishing herself in New York City's East Side nightclub scene, in venues that suited her distinct vocal style and silky, dusky timbre, earning her the nickname, "The Girl with the Mink-Lined Voice". Downbeat Magazine critiqued her vocals as having a "good sound" and that she "phrased well". Winters retired from performing in 1969, marking the end of a nearly two decade long career. In 1981, she made a brief comeback, singing in various jazz clubs in Los Angeles. She continued performing until 1984, when she quit performing altogether.

== Personal life ==
In the 1950s, Jerri Winters married jazz trumpeter Willie Thomas (1931–2019), whom she met during their involvement in the New York jazz scene. The marriage lasted for 7 years, coinciding with Winter's partnership with the Al Belletto Sextet. The members of the group consisted of Al Belletto (alto sax, clarinet, vocals), Jack Martin (trumpet, French horn, bass, chief arranger, vocals), Danny Conn (trumpet, mellophone, bass, vocals), Willie Thomas (trumpet, vocals), Jimmy Guinn (trombone, tenor sax, bass, arranger, vocals), Fred Crane (piano, baritone sax, arranger, vocals), Skip Fawcett (bass, vocals), Kenny O’Brien (bass, vocals), Ray Brown (bass), Charles McKnight (drums, vocals), Tom Montgomery (drums, trumpet, vocals), and Louis Marino (drums). The group also provided background vocals for Jerri Winters on her 1957 album Somebody Loves Me. After her official retirement from performing in 1984, little is known about her life thereafter; with her presumably living a private life. According to a comment on a Youtube post of Winters with Woody Herman's band, she is currently living in Michigan and has one grandson.

== Discography ==
Albums

- Winter's Here (1955, Fraternity Records)
- Somebody Loves Me (1957, Bethlehem Records) (with the Al Belletto Sextet)
- Winters Again (1962)

45 RPM vinyls

- Cigar Box/Weekend Blues (with Dan Belloc and his orchestra; 1957)
- Clay Idol/A Kiss From Your Lips (duet with Dick Noel, conducted by Dan Belloc and his orchestra; 1956)
- How Come You Do Me Like You Do/I've Got A Crush on You (1954; Rainbow Records)
- I'm Afraid to Love You/This is our Song of Love (arr. Mundell Lowe, final solo vinyl record July 1962; Parker Records)

With Stan Kenton

- All Because of You (arr. Johnny Richards) February 24, 1952
- Cinderella (arr. Johnny Richards) February 24, 1952
- Don't Worry 'Bout Me (arr. Pete Rugolo) February 24, 1952 (with Helen Carr, Chris Connor and Kay Brown)
- She's A Comely Wench (arr. Johnny Richards) March 18, 1952
- Yes (arr. Johnny Richards) February 24, 1952

Compilation albums

- Kenton's Girl Friends (1973 LP)
- Winter's Here/Love in a Midnight Mood (2 album CD; Jerri Winters, Genie Pace, vocalists, 2024; Fresh Sound Records)
- Stan's Singers (2004 CD)
- The Complete Capitol Studio Recordings of Stan Kenton 1943–1947 (1995 CD)
