= Live at Cobi's 2 =

Live album by Bill & Kenny Barron Quartet
- Released: August 8, 2006
- Recorded: October 5, 1985
- Venue: Cobi's Place, NYC
- Genre: Jazz
- Length: 70:38
- Label: SteepleChase; SCCD 31596
- Producer: Nils Winther

Bill Barron chronology
Compilation (1984–85)	Live at Cobi's 2 (2006)	The Next Plateau (1987)

Live at Cobi's 2 is a live album by saxophonist Bill Barron which was recorded in 1985 and released posthumously on the SteepleChase label in 2006.

== Track listing ==
All compositions by Bill Barron except where noted.

1. "September 1979" – 11:25
2. "Spring Thing" – 15:39
3. "What's New?" (Bob Haggart, Johnny Burke) – 8:52
4. "Interpretation" – 14:58
5. "Tragic Magin" (Kenny Barron) – 8:25
6. "Cherokee" (Ray Noble) – 11:19

== Personnel ==
- Bill Barron – tenor saxophone
- Kenny Barron – piano
- Cecil McBee – bass
- Ben Riley – drums
