= Josie de Guzman =

American actress

Josie de Guzman, also known as Jossie de Guzman, is an American actress and singer of Puerto Rican descent, best known for work in the theatre.

== Career ==
Josie de Guzman graduated from the Academia del Perpetuo Socorro. After studying at the Boston Conservatory of Music, Guzman made her Broadway debut in 1978 as Lidia in the original production of Elizabeth Swados's Runaways. She returned to Broadway the following year to portray Gia Campbell in the original production of Joseph Stein and Alan Jay Lerner's Carmelina.

In 1980 she was handpicked by Leonard Bernstein to portray Maria in the 1980 revival of West Side Story for which she received her first Tony Award nomination. She returned to Broadway in 1992 to portray Sarah Brown in Jerry Zaks's critically acclaimed revival of Frank Loesser's Guys and Dolls with Nathan Lane, Peter Gallagher, and Faith Prince. For her performance she earned a second Tony Award nomination. The recording of the cast album was filmed for broadcast on PBS's Great Performances. She is currently a member of the Acting Company of the Alley Theatre in Houston, Texas.

Although Guzman's career has been in theatre, she has occasionally performed on television and in films. Her television credits include The Tenth Month (1979), Miami Vice (1984), Reading Rainbow (1998), and Third Watch (2002). Her film credits include F/X (1986)

== Filmography ==
=== Film ===
Year	Title	Role	Notes
1986	F/X	Marisa Velez	
1991	F/X2	Marisa Velez	

=== Television ===
Year	Title	Role	Notes
1979	The Tenth Month	Iliana	Television film
1983	Guiding Light	Anita	—
1984	Miami Vice	Maria Rivera	Episode: "Brother's Keeper"
1984	The Cosby Show	Mrs. Ramos	Episode: "How Ugly Is He?"
1998	Reading Rainbow	—	Episode: "Saturday Sancocho"
2002	Third Watch	Alicia	Episode: "The Unforgiven"

== Stage ==
Year	Title	Role(s)	Notes	Ref.
1978	Runaways	Lidia	Broadway (debut) Also provided translations and original material in Spanish	
1979	Carmelina	Gia Campbell	Broadway	
1980	West Side Story	Maria	Broadway	
1991	Fuente Ovejuna	Laurencia	Shakespeare Theatre at the Folger	
1991	Nick & Nora	Maria Valdez	Broadway	
1992	Guys and Dolls	Sarah Brown	Broadway	
1997	Carmen	Carmen	Court Theatre (Chicago)	
2001	The Music Man	Marian Paroo	Cherry County Playhouse	
2003	Diosa	Amber	Hartford Stage	
2004	Nine	Luisa	North Shore Music Theatre	
2009	The Man Who Came to Dinner	Maggie Cutler	Alley Theatre	
2009	Rock 'n' Roll	Esme	Alley Theatre	
2010	Mrs. Mannerly	Mrs. Mannerly	Alley Theatre	
2011	August: Osage County	Barbara Fordham	Alley Theatre	
2011	And Then There Were None	Vera Claythorne	Alley Theatre	
2012	The Seagull	Arkadina	Alley Theatre	
2012	Noises Off	Belinda Blair	Alley Theatre	
2012	Black Coffee	Barbara Armory	Alley Theatre	
2012	Death of a Salesman	Linda Loman	Alley Theatre	
2013	Sherlock Holmes and the Adventure of the Suicide Club	Club Secretary	Alley Theatre	
2013	The Hollow	Lady Lucy	Alley Theatre	
2013	You Can't Take It with You	Penelope Sycamore	Alley Theatre	
2014	Communicating Doors	Ruella	Alley Theatre	
2014	Vanya and Sonia and Masha and Spike	Masha	Alley Theatre	
2014	A Christmas Carol: A Ghost Story of Christmas	Spirit of Christmas Past	Alley Theatre	
2015	All My Sons	Kate Keller	Alley Theatre	
2015	The Other Place	Juliana	Alley Theatre	
2016	The Nether	Detective Morris	Alley Theatre	
2016	Agatha Christie's Spider's Web	Clarissa Hailsham-Brown	Alley Theatre	
2016	A Midsummer Night's Dream	Hippolyta, Titania	Alley Theatre	
