= Don McKay (actor) =

American singer

- Born: January 28, 1925; Buttermilk Hill, West Virginia, U.S.
- Died: December 26, 2018 (aged 93); Manhattan, New York City, U.S.
- Occupations: Actor; dancer; singer

Don McKay (January 28, 1925 – December 26, 2018) was an American actor, dancer, and singer.

McKay was born in Buttermilk Hill, West Virginia.

He played in musicals like Make a Wish and Top Banana in 1951, and West Side Story in 1958 and 1964, as well as Show Boat in 1959 and On the Town in 1963.

McKay began teaching voice in Connecticut in 1957 and acting in regional theater there.
