= Bill Barron (musician) =

- Born: William Barron, Jr. March 27, 1927; Philadelphia, Pennsylvania, US
- Died: September 21, 1989 (aged 62) Middletown, Connecticut, US
- Genres: Jazz
- Occupations: Musician, educator
- Instruments: Saxophone, clarinet
- Formerly of: Ted Curson, Cecil Taylor, Kenny Barron

William Barron, Jr. (March 27, 1927 – September 21, 1989) was an American jazz tenor and soprano saxophonist.

Barron was born in Philadelphia, Pennsylvania. He began studying the piano when he was nine years old and later switched to the saxophone. He toured with the Carolina Cotton Pickers when he was 17. He first appeared on a Cecil Taylor recording in 1959, and he later recorded extensively with Philly Joe Jones and co-led a post-bop quartet with Ted Curson. His younger brother, pianist Kenny Barron, appeared on all of the sessions that the elder Barron led. Other musicians he recorded with included Charles Mingus and Ollie Shearer.

Barron also directed a jazz workshop at the Children's Museum in Brooklyn, taught at City College of New York, and became the chairman of the music department at Wesleyan University. He recorded for Savoy, recording that label's last jazz record in 1972, and Muse. The Bill Barron Collection is housed at the Institute of Jazz Studies of the Rutgers University libraries.

Barron died of cancer on September 21, 1989 in Middletown, Connecticut.

== Discography ==
=== As leader ===
- The Tenor Stylings of Bill Barron (Savoy, 1961)
- Modern Windows (Savoy, 1962)
- West Side Story Bossa Nova (Dauntless, 1963)
- Hot Line (Savoy, 1964)
- Now Hear This! (Audio Fidelity, 1964)
- Motivation (Savoy, 1972)
- Jazz Caper (Muse, 1982)
- Variations in Blue (Muse, 1983)
- The Next Plateau (Muse, 1989)
- Higher Ground (Joken, 1993)
- A Swedish-American Venture (Dragon, 2002)
- Live at Cobi's (SteepleChase, 2005)
- Live at Cobi's 2 (SteepleChase, 2006)

=== As sideman ===
With Ted Curson

- Plenty of Horn (Old Town, 1961)
- Tears for Dolphy (Fontana, 1965)
- The New Thing & the Blue Thing (Atlantic, 1965)
- Flip Top (Arista/Freedom, 1977)
- Snake Johnson (Chiaroscuro, 1981)

With Charlie Mingus

- Pre-Bird (Mercury, 1961) [reissued as Jazz Makers (Mercury, 1963) / Mingus Revisited (Limelight, 1965)]
- Take the A Train (Back Up, 2006)

With others

- Kenny Barron, Lucifer (Muse, 1975)
- Ted Heath, London Stereo Laboratory Vol. 4 Big Band (London, 1974)
- Philly Joe Jones, Philly Joe's Beat (Atlantic, 1960)
- Philly Joe Jones, Showcase (Riverside, 1960)
- Cecil Taylor, Love for Sale (United Artists, 1959)
- Cecil Taylor, In Transition (Blue Note, 1975)
