= West Side Story =

Musical by Leonard Bernstein and Stephen Sondheim

- Original Broadway cast recording
- Music: Leonard Bernstein
- Lyrics: Stephen Sondheim
- Book: Arthur Laurents
- Concept: Jerome Robbins
- Basis: Romeo and Juliet by William Shakespeare
- Productions: 1957 Washington, D.C. 1957 Philadelphia; 1957 Broadway; 1958 West End; 1959 US tour 1960 Broadway revival 1964 Broadway revival 1974 West End revival 1980 Broadway revival 1984 West End revival 1985 US tour 1995 US tour 1998 West End revival 2009 Broadway revival 2010 US tour 2020 Broadway revival

West Side Story is a musical conceived by Jerome Robbins with music by Leonard Bernstein, lyrics by Stephen Sondheim, and a book by Arthur Laurents.

Inspired by William Shakespeare's play Romeo and Juliet, the story is set in the mid-1950s on the Upper West Side of Manhattan in New York City, then a multiracial, blue-collar neighborhood. The musical explores the rivalry between the Jets and the Sharks, two teenage street gangs of different ethnic backgrounds. The Sharks, who are recent migrants from Puerto Rico, and the Jets, who are white, vie for dominance of the neighborhood, and the police try to keep order. The young protagonist, Tony, a former member of the Jets and best friend of the gang's leader, Riff, falls in love with Maria, the sister of Bernardo, the leader of the Sharks. The dark theme, sophisticated music, extended dance scenes, tragic love story, and focus on social problems marked a turning point in musical theatre.

The original 1957 Broadway production, directed and choreographed by Robbins, marked Sondheim's Broadway debut. It ran for 732 performances before going on tour. The production was nominated for six Tony Awards, winning two. The show had an even longer-running West End production, a number of revivals, and international productions. A 1961 musical film adaptation, co-directed by Robert Wise and Robbins, was nominated for eleven Academy Awards and won ten, including Best Picture. A 2021 film adaptation, directed by Steven Spielberg was also nominated for the Academy Award for Best Picture, along with six additional nominations, winning for Best Supporting Actress.

== Background ==
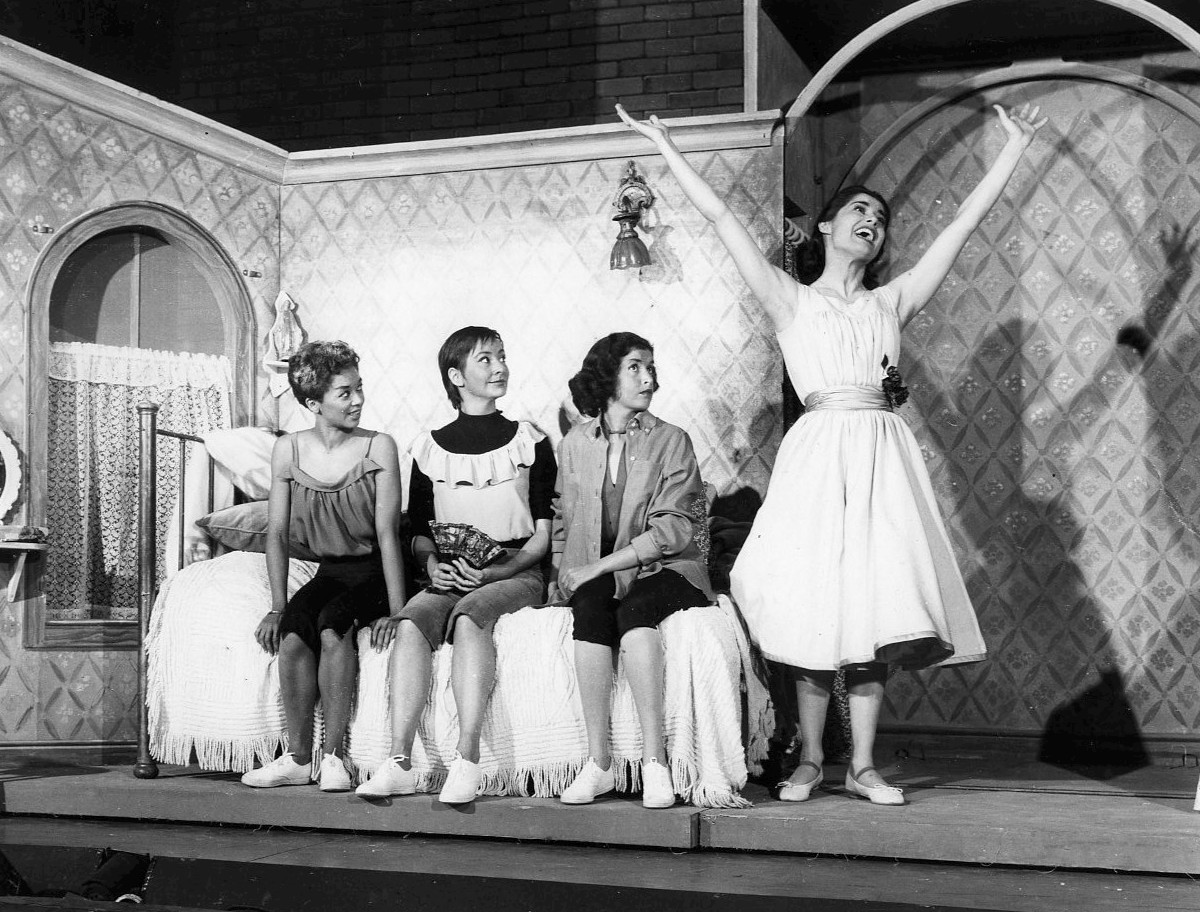
L-R: Elizabeth Taylor, Carmen Gutierrez, Marilyn Cooper, and Carol Lawrence from the original Broadway cast sing "I Feel Pretty" (1957)

=== Genesis ===
In 1949 Jerome Robbins approached Leonard Bernstein and Arthur Laurents about collaborating on a contemporary musical adaptation of Romeo and Juliet. He proposed that the plot focus on the conflict between a Catholic family and a Jewish family living on the Lower East Side of Manhattan, during the Easter–Passover season; the girl has survived the Holocaust and emigrated from Israel. The conflict was to be centered on antisemitism of the Catholic "Jets" towards the Jewish "Emeralds". Eager to write his first musical, Laurents immediately agreed. Bernstein wanted to present the material in operatic form, but Robbins and Laurents resisted the suggestion. They described the project as "lyric theater", and Laurents wrote a first draft he called East Side Story. Only after he completed it did the group realize it was little more than a musicalization of themes that had already been covered in plays like Abie's Irish Rose. When Robbins opted to drop out, the three men went their separate ways, and the piece was shelved for almost five years.

In 1955 theatrical producer Martin Gabel was working on a stage adaptation of the James M. Cain novel Serenade, about an opera singer who comes to the realization he is homosexual, and he invited Laurents to write the book. Laurents accepted and suggested Bernstein and Robbins join the creative team. Robbins felt that if the three were going to join forces, they should return to East Side Story, and Bernstein agreed. Laurents, however, was committed to Gabel, who introduced him to the young composer/lyricist Stephen Sondheim. Sondheim auditioned by playing the score for Saturday Night, his musical that was scheduled to open in the fall. Laurents liked the lyrics but was not impressed with the music. Sondheim did not care for Laurents' opinion. Serenade ultimately was shelved.

Laurents was soon hired to write the screenplay for a remake of the 1934 Greta Garbo film The Painted Veil for Ava Gardner. While in Hollywood, he contacted Bernstein, who was in town conducting at the Hollywood Bowl. The two met at The Beverly Hills Hotel, and the conversation turned to juvenile delinquent gangs, a fairly recent social phenomenon that had received major coverage on the front pages of the morning newspapers due to a Chicano turf war. Bernstein suggested they rework East Side Story and set it in Los Angeles, but Laurents felt he was more familiar with Puerto Ricans in the United States and Harlem than he was with Mexican Americans and Olvera Street. The two contacted Robbins, who was enthusiastic about a musical with a Latin beat. He arrived in Hollywood to choreograph the dance sequences for the 1956 film The King and I, and he and Laurents began developing the musical while working on their respective projects, keeping in touch with Bernstein, who had returned to New York. When the producer of The Painted Veil replaced Gardner with Eleanor Parker and asked Laurents to revise his script with her in mind, he backed out of the film, freeing him to devote all his time to the stage musical. Bernstein and Laurents, who had been blacklisted for alleged communist activities, worked with Robbins even though he had cooperated with the House Un-American Activities Committee.

=== Collaboration and development ===
In New York City, Laurents went to the opening night party for a new play by Ugo Betti. There he met Sondheim, who had heard that East Side Story, now retitled West Side Story, was back on track. Bernstein had decided he needed to concentrate solely on the music, and he and Robbins had invited Betty Comden and Adolph Green to write the lyrics, but the team opted to work on Peter Pan instead. Laurents asked Sondheim if he would be interested in tackling the task. Initially he resisted, because he was determined to write the full score for his next project (Saturday Night had been scrapped). But Oscar Hammerstein convinced him that he would benefit from the experience, and he accepted. Meanwhile, Laurents had written a new draft of the book changing the characters' backgrounds: the male lead, once an Irish American, was now of Polish and Irish descent, and the formerly Jewish female lead had become Puerto Rican.

The original book Laurents wrote closely adhered to Romeo and Juliet, but the characters based on Shakespeare's Rosaline and the parents of the doomed lovers were eliminated early on. Later the scenes related to Juliet's faking her death and committing suicide also were deleted. Language posed a problem; profanity was uncommon in the theater at the time, and slang expressions were avoided for fear they would be dated by the time the production opened. Laurents ultimately invented what sounded like real street talk but actually was not: "cut the frabba-jabba", for example. Sondheim converted long passages of dialogue, and sometimes just a simple phrase like "A boy like that would kill your brother", into lyrics. With the help of Oscar Hammerstein, Laurents convinced Bernstein and Sondheim to move "One Hand, One Heart", which he considered too pristine for the balcony scene, to the scene set in the bridal shop, and as a result "Tonight" was written to replace it. Laurents felt that the building tension needed to be alleviated in order to increase the impact of the play's tragic outcome, so comic relief in the form of Officer Krupke was added to the second act. He was outvoted on other issues: he felt the lyrics to "America" and "I Feel Pretty" were too witty for the characters singing them, but they stayed in the score and proved to be audience favorites. Another song, "Kid Stuff", was added and quickly removed during the Washington, D.C., tryout when Laurents convinced the others it was helping tip the balance of the show into typical musical comedy.

Bernstein composed West Side Story and Candide concurrently, which led to some switches of material between the two works. Tony and Maria's duet, "One Hand, One Heart", was originally intended for Cunegonde in Candide. The music of "Gee, Officer Krupke" was pulled from the Venice scene in Candide. Laurents explained the style that the creative team finally decided on:

Just as Tony and Maria, our Romeo and Juliet, set themselves apart from the other kids by their love, so we have tried to set them even further apart by their language, their songs, their movement. Wherever possible in the show, we have tried to heighten emotion or to articulate inarticulate adolescence through music, song or dance.

The show was nearly complete in the fall of 1956, but almost everyone on the creative team needed to fulfill other commitments first. Robbins was involved with Bells Are Ringing, then Bernstein with Candide, and in January 1957 A Clearing in the Woods, Laurents' latest play, opened and quickly closed. When a backers' audition failed to raise any money for West Side Story late in the spring of 1957, only two months before the show was to begin rehearsals, producer Cheryl Crawford pulled out of the project. Every other producer had already turned down the show, deeming it too dark and depressing. Bernstein was despondent, but Sondheim convinced his friend Hal Prince, who was in Boston overseeing the out-of-town tryout of the new George Abbott musical New Girl in Town, to read the script. He liked it but decided to ask Abbott, his longtime mentor, for his opinion, and Abbott advised him to turn it down. Prince, aware that Abbott was the primary reason New Girl was in trouble, decided to ignore him, and he and his producing partner Robert E. Griffith flew to New York to hear the score. In his memoirs, Prince recalled: "Sondheim and Bernstein sat at the piano playing through the music, and soon I was singing along with them".

=== Production period ===
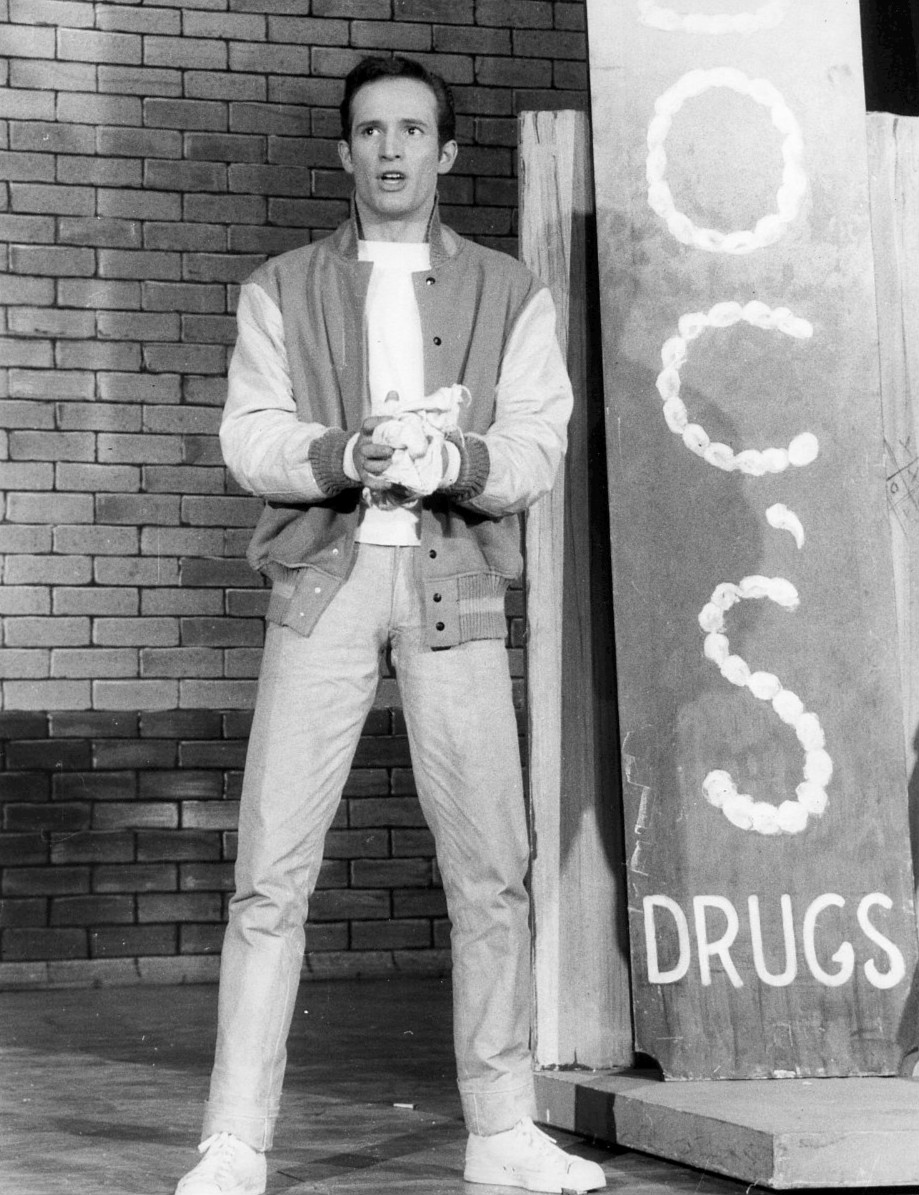
Larry Kert as Tony, original Broadway production (1957)

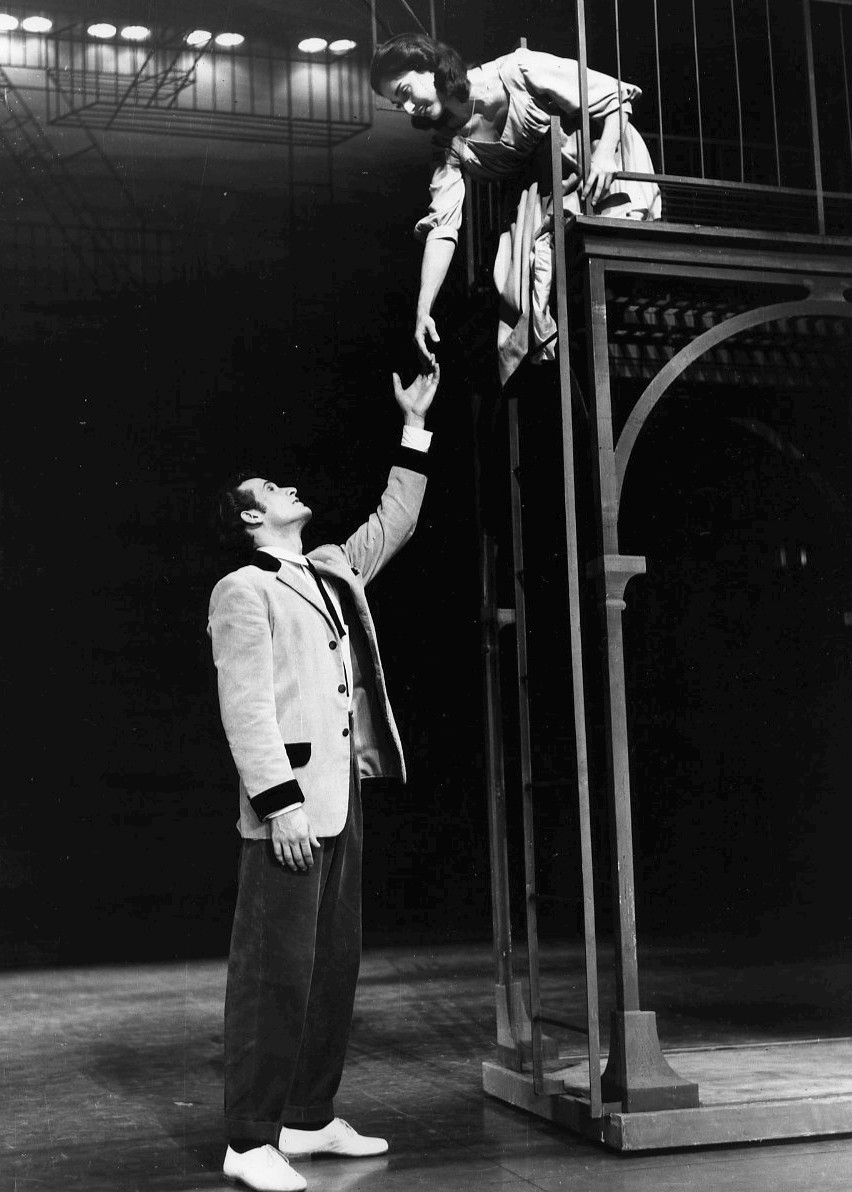
Kert and Lawrence in the balcony scene (1957)

Prince began cutting the budget and raising money. Robbins then announced he did not want to choreograph the show, but changed his mind when Prince agreed to an eight-week dance rehearsal period (instead of the customary four), since there was to be more dancing in West Side Story than in any previous Broadway show, and allowed Robbins to hire Peter Gennaro as his assistant. Originally, when considering the cast, Laurents wanted James Dean for the lead role of Tony, but the actor soon died. Sondheim found Larry Kert and Chita Rivera, who created the roles of Tony and Anita, respectively. Getting the work on stage was still not easy. Bernstein said:

Everyone told us that [West Side Story] was an impossible project ... And we were told no one was going to be able to sing augmented fourths, as with "Ma-ri-a" ... Also, they said the score was too rangy for pop music ... Besides, who wanted to see a show in which the first-act curtain comes down on two dead bodies lying on the stage?... And then we had the really tough problem of casting it, because the characters had to be able not only to sing but dance and act and be taken for teenagers. Ultimately, some of the cast were teenagers, some were 21, some were 30 but looked 16. Some were wonderful singers but couldn't dance very well, or vice versa ... and if they could do both, they couldn't act.

Throughout the rehearsal period, the New York newspapers were filled with articles about gang warfare, keeping the show's plot timely. Robbins kept the cast members playing the Sharks and the Jets separate to discourage them from socializing with each other and reminded everyone of the reality of gang violence by posting news stories on the bulletin board backstage. Robbins wanted a gritty realism from his sneaker- and jeans-clad cast. He gave the ensemble more freedom than Broadway dancers had previously been given to interpret their roles, and the dancers were thrilled to be treated like actors instead of just choreographed bodies. Robbins gave each dancer a unique gesture repertoire specific to their character. As the rehearsals wore on, Bernstein fought to keep his score together, as other members of the team called on him to cut out more and more of the sweeping or complex "operatic" passages. Columbia Records initially declined to record the cast album, saying the score was too depressing and too difficult.

There were problems with Oliver Smith's designs. His painted backdrops were stunning, but the sets were, for the most part, either shabby looking or too stylized. Prince refused to spend money on new construction, and Smith was obliged to improve what he had as best he could with very little money to do it. The pre-Broadway run in Washington, D.C., was a critical and commercial success, although none of the reviews mentioned Sondheim, listed as co-lyricist, who was overshadowed by the better-known Bernstein. Bernstein magnanimously removed his name as co-author of the lyrics, although Sondheim was uncertain he wanted to receive sole credit for what he considered to be overly florid contributions by Bernstein. Robbins demanded and received a "Conceived by" credit, and used it to justify his making major decisions regarding changes in the show without consulting the others. As a result, by opening night on Broadway, none of his collaborators were talking to him.

It was rumored that while Bernstein was away trying to fix the musical Candide, Sondheim wrote some of the music for West Side Story, and that Bernstein's co-lyricist billing disappeared from the credits of West Side Story during the tryout as a trade-off. However, Steven Suskin writes in his book Show Tunes that "as the writing progressed and the extent of Bernstein's lyric contributions became less, the composer agreed to rescind his credit. ... Contrary to rumor, Sondheim did not write music for the show; his only contribution came on 'Something's Coming'", where he developed the main strain of the chorus from music Bernstein wrote for the verse.

== Synopsis ==
=== Act 1 ===
Two rival teenage gangs, the Jets (white Americans) and the Sharks (Puerto Ricans), struggle for control of the San Juan Hill neighborhood on the Upper West Side of Manhattan (Prologue). Police officers Krupke and Lt. Schrank warn them to stop fighting on their beat. The police chase the Sharks off, and then the Jets plan how they can assure their continued dominance of the street. The Jets' leader, Riff, suggests setting up a rumble with the Sharks. He plans to make the challenge to Bernardo, the Sharks' leader, that night at the neighborhood dance. Riff wants to convince his best friend and former member of the Jets, Tony, to meet the Jets at the dance. Some of the Jets are unsure of his loyalty, but Riff is adamant that Tony is still one of them ("Jet Song"). Riff meets Tony while he's working at Doc's Drugstore to persuade him to come. Tony initially refuses, but Riff wins him over. Tony is convinced that something important is round the corner ("Something's Coming").

Maria works in a bridal shop with Anita, the girlfriend of her brother, Bernardo. Maria has just arrived from Puerto Rico for her arranged marriage to Chino, a friend of Bernardo's. Maria confesses to Anita that she is not in love with Chino. Anita makes Maria a dress to wear to the neighborhood dance.

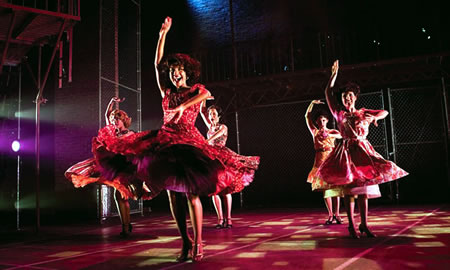
Shark girls in "America", Portland Center Stage production, 2007

At the dance, after introductions, the teenagers begin to dance; soon a challenge dance is called ("Dance at the Gym"), during which Tony and Maria (who aren't taking part in the challenge dance) see each other across the room and are drawn to each other. They dance together, forgetting the tension in the room, and fall in love. Bernardo pulls his sister from Tony and sends her home. Riff and Bernardo agree to meet for a War Council at Doc's, a drug store which is considered neutral ground, but meanwhile, an infatuated and happy Tony finds Maria's building and serenades her outside her bedroom ("Maria"). She appears on her fire escape, and the two profess their love for one another ("Tonight"). Meanwhile, Anita, Rosalia, and the other Shark girls discuss the differences between the territory of Puerto Rico and the mainland United States of America, with Anita defending America, and Rosalia yearning for Puerto Rico ("America").

The Jets get antsy while waiting for the Sharks inside Doc's drugstore. Riff helps them let out their aggression ("Cool"). The Sharks arrive to discuss weapons to use in the rumble. Tony suggests "a fair fight" (fists only), which the leaders agree to, despite the other members' protests. Bernardo believes that he will fight Tony, but must settle for fighting Diesel, Riff's second-in-command, instead. This is followed by a monologue by the ineffective Lt. Schrank trying to find out the location of the rumble. Tony tells Doc about Maria. Doc is worried for them while Tony is convinced that nothing can go wrong; he is in love.

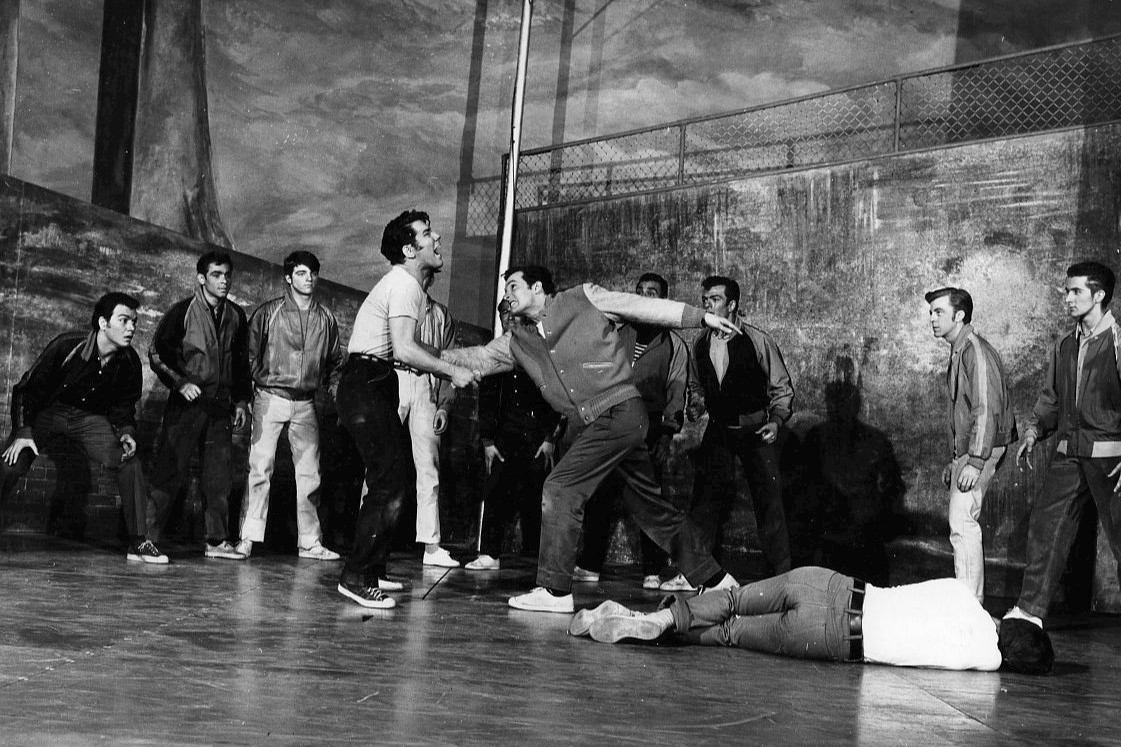
Tony stabs Bernardo in the 1957 Broadway production.

The next day, Maria is in a very happy mood at the bridal shop, as she anticipates seeing Tony again, but she is dismayed when she learns about the upcoming rumble from Anita. When Tony arrives, Maria insists that he must stop the fight altogether, which he agrees to do. Before he goes, they dream of their wedding ("One Hand, One Heart"). Tony, Maria, Anita, Bernardo and the Sharks, and Riff and the Jets all anticipate the events to come that night ("Tonight Quintet"). The gangs meet under the highway and, as the fight between Bernardo and Diesel begins, Tony arrives and tries to stop it. Though Bernardo taunts and provokes Tony, ridiculing his attempt to make peace, Tony keeps his composure. When Bernardo pushes Tony, Riff punches him in Tony's defense. The two draw their switchblades and get in a fight ("The Rumble"). Tony attempts to intervene, inadvertently leading to Riff being fatally stabbed by Bernardo. Tony kills Bernardo in a fit of rage, which in turn provokes an all-out fight like the fight in the Prologue. The sound of approaching police sirens is heard, and everyone scatters, except Tony, who stands in shock at what he has done. The tomboy Anybodys, who stubbornly wishes that she could become a Jet, tells Tony to flee from the scene at the last moment and leaves with the knives. Only the bodies of Riff and Bernardo remain.

=== Act 2 ===
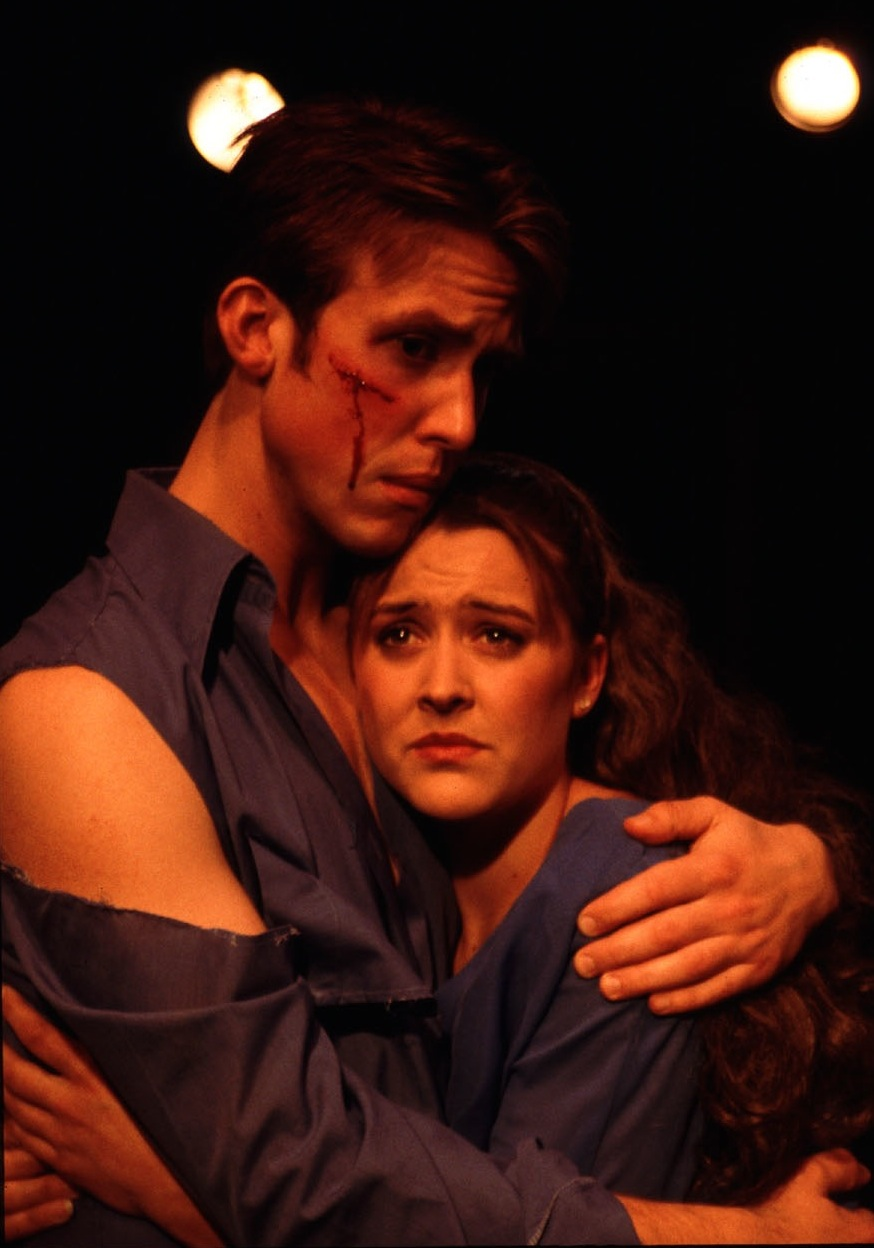
Tony (Justin Gordon) and Maria (Erica Racz) in Pacific Repertory Theatre production, 2001

Blissfully unaware that the rumble has taken place with fatal consequences, Maria giddily sings to her friends Rosalia, Teresita, and Francisca that she is in love ("I Feel Pretty"). Chino brings the news that Tony has killed Bernardo, then leaves. Maria prays that what he has told her is a lie. Tony arrives to admit the killing and tells Maria that he plans to surrender to the police. She pounds his chest with rage, but she still loves him. They plan to run away together. As the walls of Maria's bedroom disappear, they find themselves in a dreamlike world of peace ("Somewhere").

Two of the Jets, A-Rab and Baby John, are set on by Officer Krupke, but they manage to escape him. They meet the rest of the gang. To cheer themselves up, they lampoon Krupke and the other adults who don't understand them ("Gee, Officer Krupke"). Anybodys arrives and tells the Jets that she has been spying on the Puerto Ricans; she has discovered that Chino has a gun and is looking for Tony. The gang separates to find Tony and protect him. Action has taken charge; he accepts Anybodys into the Jets and includes her in the search.

A grieving Anita arrives at Maria's apartment. As Tony leaves, he tells Maria to meet him at Doc's so they can run away to the country. Despite Maria's attempts to conceal it, Anita sees that Tony has been with Maria, and launches an angry tirade against him ("A Boy Like That"). Maria counters by telling Anita how powerful love is ("I Have a Love"), and Anita realizes that Maria loves Tony as much as she had loved Bernardo. She admits that Chino has a gun and is looking for Tony. Lt. Schrank arrives to question Maria about her brother's death, and Anita agrees to go to Doc's to warn Tony that Maria will be late. Unfortunately, the Jets, who have found Tony, have congregated at Doc's, and they taunt Anita with racist slurs and eventually attempt rape. Doc arrives and stops them. Furious, Anita spitefully delivers the wrong message, telling the Jets that Chino has shot Maria dead.

Doc relates the news to Tony, who has been dreaming of heading to the countryside to have children with Maria. Feeling there is no longer anything to live for, Tony leaves to find Chino, begging for him to shoot him as well. Just as Tony sees Maria alive, Chino arrives and shoots Tony. The Jets, Sharks, and adults flock around the lovers. Maria holds Tony in her arms (and sings a quiet, brief reprise of "Somewhere") as he dies. Angry at the death of another friend, the Jets move towards the Sharks but Maria takes Chino's gun and tells everyone that "all of [them]" killed Tony and the others because of their hate for each other, and, "Now I can kill too, because now I have hate!" she yells. However, she is unable to bring herself to fire the gun and drops it, crying in grief. Gradually, all the members of both gangs assemble on either side of Tony's body, showing that the feud is over. As Krupke takes a remorseful Chino into custody, the Jets and Sharks form a procession, and together carry Tony away, with Maria the last one in the procession.

== Characters ==
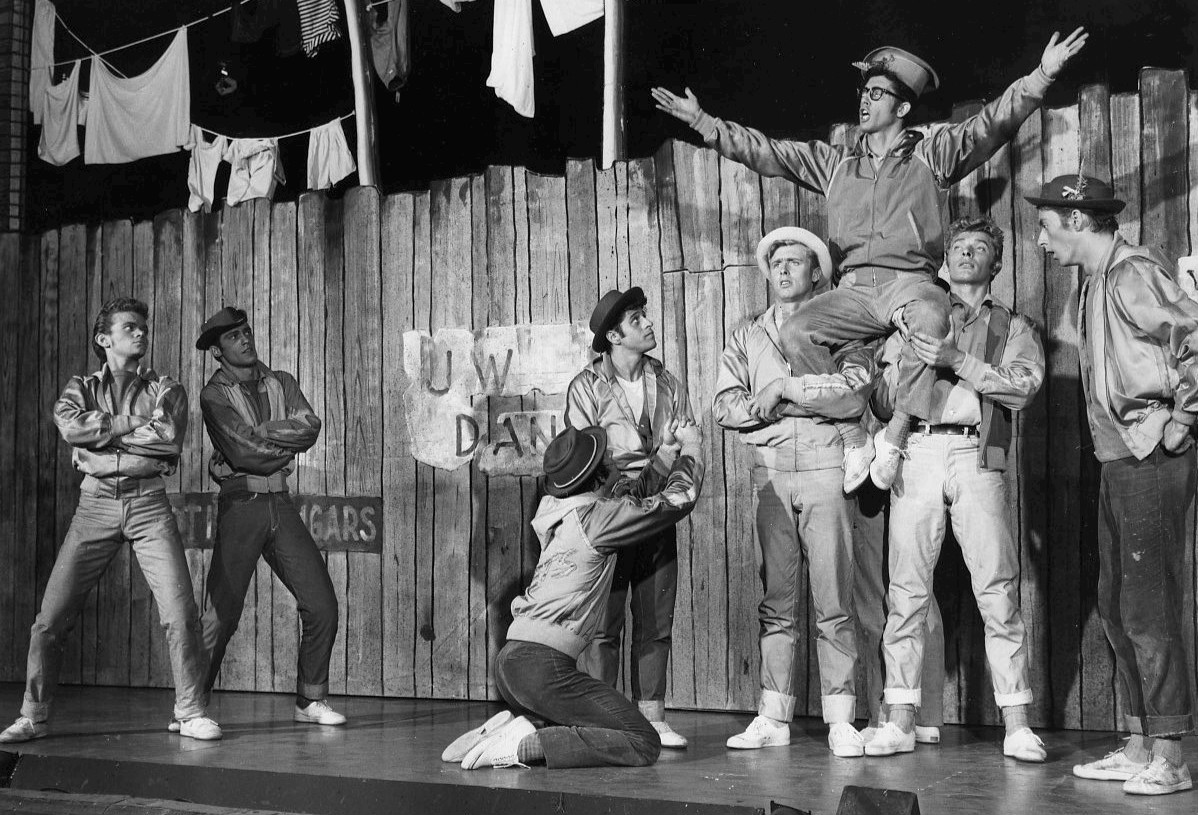
"Gee, Officer Krupke" sung by the Jets, original Broadway cast (1957)

The Jets
- Riff, the leader
- Tony, Riff's best friend
- Diesel, Riff's (and later Action's) lieutenant
- Action, who succeeds Riff as leader
- A-Rab, Baby John, Big Deal, Gee-Tar, Mouthpiece, Snowboy, Tiger and Anybodys

The Jet Girls

- Velma, Riff's girlfriend
- Graziella, Diesel's girlfriend
- Minnie, Clarice and Pauline

The Sharks

- Bernardo, the leader
- Chino, Bernardo's best friend
- Pepe, second-in-command
- Indio, Luis, Anxious, Nibbles, Juano, Toro and Moose

The Shark Girls

- Maria, Bernardo's sister
- Anita, Bernardo's girlfriend
- Rosalia, Consuelo, Teresita, Francisca, Estella and Marguerita

The Adults

- Doc, owner of the local drugstore/soda shop
- Schrank, racist local police lieutenant
- Krupke, neighborhood cop and Schrank's right-hand man
- Glad Hand, well-meaning social worker in charge of the dance

== Cast ==
Character	Broadway	West End	Broadway Revival	Broadway Revival	Broadway Revival	Broadway Revival	Broadway Revival
Character	1957	1958	1960	1964	1980	2009	2020
Tony	Larry Kert	Don McKay	Larry Kert	Don McKay	Ken Marshall	Matt Cavenaugh	Isaac Cole Powell
Maria	Carol Lawrence	Marlys Watters	Carol Lawrence	Julia Migenes	Josie de Guzman	Josefina Scaglione	Shereen Pimentel
Anita	Chita Rivera	Chita Rivera	Allyn Ann McLerie	Luba Lisa	Debbie Allen	Karen Olivo	Yesenia Ayala
Riff	Michael Callan	George Chakiris	Tom Hasson	James Moore	James J. Mellon	Cody Green	Dharon E. Jones
Bernardo	Ken LeRoy	Ken LeRoy	George Marcy	Jay Norman	Héctor Jaime Mercado	George Akram	Amar Ramasar
Lt. Schrank	Arch Johnson	Ted Gunther	Ted Gunther	Ted Gunther	Arch Johnson	Steve Bassett	Thomas Jay Ryan
Doc	Art Smith	David Bauer	Albert M. Ottenheimer	Harry Davis	Sammy Smith	Greg Vinkler	Daniel Oreskes
Krupke	William Bramley	Hal Galili	Roger Franklin	Frank Downing	John Bentley	Lee Sellars	Danny Wolohan

== Musical numbers ==
=== Act 1 ===
- "Prologue" – Orchestra, danced by Jets & Sharks
- "Jet Song" – Riff & Jets
- "Something's Coming" – Tony
- "The Dance at the Gym" – Orchestra, danced by Jets & Sharks
- "Maria" – Tony
- "Tonight" – Tony & Maria
- "America" – Anita, Rosalia & Shark Girls
- "Cool" – Riff & Jets
- "One Hand, One Heart" – Tony & Maria
- "Tonight (Quintet & Chorus)" – Riff, Jets, Bernardo, Sharks, Anita, Tony & Maria
- "The Rumble" – Orchestra, danced by Riff, Bernardo, Sharks & Jets

=== Act 2 ===
- "I Feel Pretty" – Maria, Rosalia, Teresita & Francisca
- "Somewhere" – Consuelo, danced by Company
- "Procession and Nightmare" – Tony, Maria & Ensemble
- "Gee, Officer Krupke" – Action, Snowboy & Jets
- "A Boy Like That/I Have a Love" – Anita & Maria
- "Finale" – Tony, Maria & Company

Notes

- In the 1964 and 1980 revivals, "Somewhere" was sung by Francisca rather than Consuelo.
- In the 2009 revival, "Cool" was performed by Riff, the Jets, and the Jet Girls. "I Feel Pretty" was sung in Spanish as "Me siento hermosa" and "A Boy Like That" was sung in Spanish as "Un hombre así". They were changed back to their English lyrics midway through the run. "Somewhere" was sung by Kiddo, a young Jet.

== Productions ==
=== Original Broadway production ===
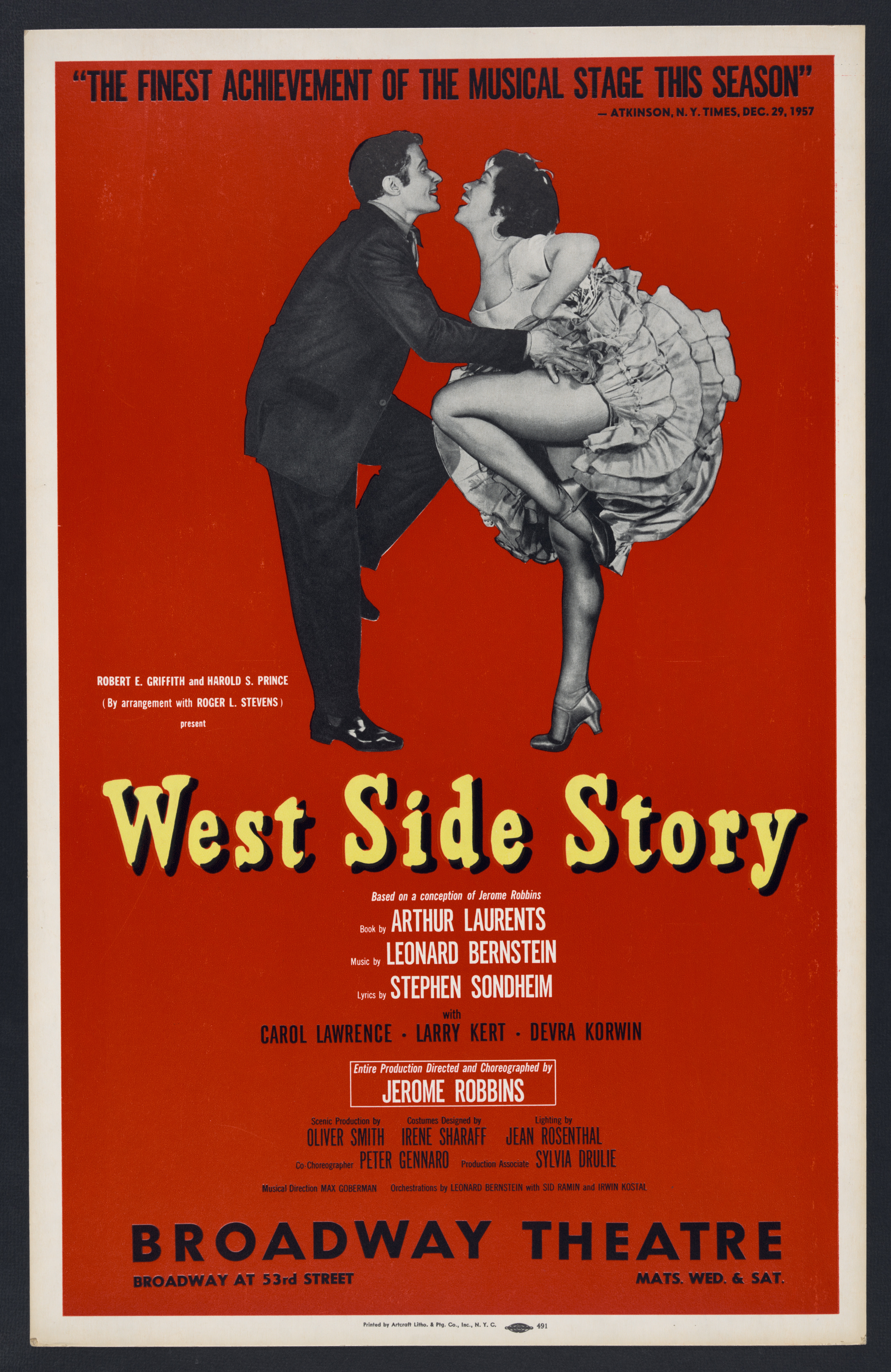
1958 poster

After tryouts at the National Theatre in Washington, D.C. and at the Erlanger Theatre in Philadelphia beginning in August 1957, the original Broadway production opened at the Winter Garden Theatre on September 26, to positive reviews. The production was directed and choreographed by Jerome Robbins, orchestrated by Sid Ramin and Irwin Kostal, and produced by Robert E. Griffith and Harold Prince, with lighting designed by Jean Rosenthal. The cast starred Larry Kert as Tony, Carol Lawrence as Maria, Chita Rivera as Anita and David Winters as Baby John. The other notable cast members in the original production were: Riff: Michael Callan, A-Rab: Tony Mordente, Big Deal: Martin Charnin, Gee-Tar: Tommy Abbott, Chino: Jamie Sanchez, Rosalia: Marilyn Cooper, Consuela [sic]: Reri Grist, Doc: Art Smith and Francisca: Elizabeth Taylor. The production closed on June 27, 1959, after 732 performances. The show was nominated for six Tony Awards, including Best Musical, in 1958, winning two: Robbins won the Tony Award for Best Choreographer, and Oliver Smith won the Tony for Best Scenic Designer. Also nominated were Carol Lawrence as Best Actress in a Supporting Role in a Musical, Max Goberman as Best Musical Director and Conductor, and Irene Sharaff for Best Costume Design. Carol Lawrence received the 1958 Theatre World Award.

The production's national tour was launched on July 1, 1959, in Denver and then played in Los Angeles, San Francisco, Chicago, Detroit, Cincinnati, Cleveland, Baltimore, Philadelphia, and Boston. It returned to the Winter Garden Theater in New York in April 1960 for another 249 performance engagement, closing in December.

=== UK productions ===
A 1958 production at the Manchester Opera House transferred to London, where it opened at Her Majesty's Theatre in the West End on December 12, and ran until June 1961 with a total of 1,039 performances. Robbins directed and choreographed, and it was co-choreographed by Peter Gennaro, with scenery by Oliver Smith. Featured performers were George Chakiris, who won an Academy Award as Bernardo in the 1961 film version, as Riff, Marlys Watters as Maria, Don McKay as Tony, and Chita Rivera reprising her Broadway role as Anita. David Holliday, who had been playing Gladhand since the London opening, took over as Tony.

The refurbished Shaftesbury Theatre reopened with a run of West Side Story from December 19, 1974, to mid-1975. It was directed by Bill Kenwright, choreographed by Roger Finch, and starred Lionel Morton as Tony and Christiana Matthews as Maria. A London production originated at Leicester Haymarket Theatre in early 1984 and transferred on May 16, to Her Majesty's Theatre. It closed on September 28, 1985. The 1980 Broadway production was recreated by Tom Abbott. The cast starred Steven Pacey as Tony and Jan Hartley as Maria. Maxine Gordon was Anybodys.

A UK national tour started in 1997 and starred David Habbin as Tony, Katie Knight Adams as Maria and Anna-Jane Casey as Anita. The production transferred to London's West End opening at the Prince Edward Theatre in October 1998, transferring to the Prince of Wales Theatre where it closed in January 2000. The production subsequently toured the UK for a second time.

A production at the Curve Theatre, starring Jamie Muscato as Tony and Adriana Ivelisse as Maria, ran from November 23, 2019, to January 11, 2020.

=== 1980 Broadway revival ===
A Broadway revival opened at the Minskoff Theatre on February 14, 1980, and closed on November 30, after 333 performances. It was directed and choreographed by Robbins, with the book scenes co-directed by Gerald Freedman; produced by Gladys Nederlander and Tom Abbott; Lee Theodore assisted in the choreography reproduction. The original scenic, lighting, and costume designs were used. It starred Ken Marshall as Tony, Josie de Guzman as Maria and Debbie Allen as Anita. Both de Guzman and Allen received Tony Award nominations as Best Featured Actress in a Musical, and the musical was nominated as Best Reproduction (Play or Musical). Allen won the Drama Desk Award as Outstanding Featured Actress in a Musical. Other notable cast members included Brent Barrett as Diesel, Harolyn Blackwell as Francisca, Stephen Bogardus as Mouth Piece and Reed Jones as Big Deal. Mary Elizabeth Mastrantonio was an understudy for Maria later in the run.

The Minskoff production subsequently opened the Nervi Festival in Genoa, Italy, in July 1981 with Josie de Guzman as Maria and Brent Barrett as Tony.

=== 2009 Broadway revival ===
In 2007, Arthur Laurents stated: "I've come up with a way of doing [West Side Story] that will make it absolutely contemporary without changing a word or a note". He directed a pre-Broadway production of West Side Story at the National Theatre in Washington, D.C., that ran from December 15, 2008, through January 17, 2009. The Broadway revival began previews at the Palace Theatre on February 23, 2009, and opened on March 19. The production wove Spanish lyrics and dialogue into the English libretto. The translations are by Tony Award winner Lin-Manuel Miranda. Laurents said: "The musical theatre and cultural conventions of 1957 made it next to impossible for the characters to have authenticity. Every member of both gangs was always a potential killer even then. Now they actually will be. Only Tony and Maria try to live in a different world". In August 2009, some of the lyrics for "A Boy Like That" ("Un Hombre Asi") and "I Feel Pretty" ("Me Siento Hermosa"), which were previously sung in Spanish in the revival, were changed back to the original English. The Spanish lyrics sung by the Sharks in the "Tonight" (Quintet) remained in Spanish. The cast featured Matt Cavenaugh as Tony, Josefina Scaglione as Maria, and Karen Olivo as Anita. Olivo won the Tony Award for Best Featured Actress, while Scaglione was nominated for the award for Leading Actress. Jeremy Jordan later was an alternate as Tony. The cast recording won the Grammy Award for Best Musical Show Album. In July 2010, the producers reduced the size of the orchestra, replacing five musicians with an off-stage synthesizer. The production closed on January 2, 2011, after 748 performances and 27 previews. The revival sold 1,074,462 tickets on Broadway over the course of nearly two years and was a financial success.

=== 2020 Broadway revival ===
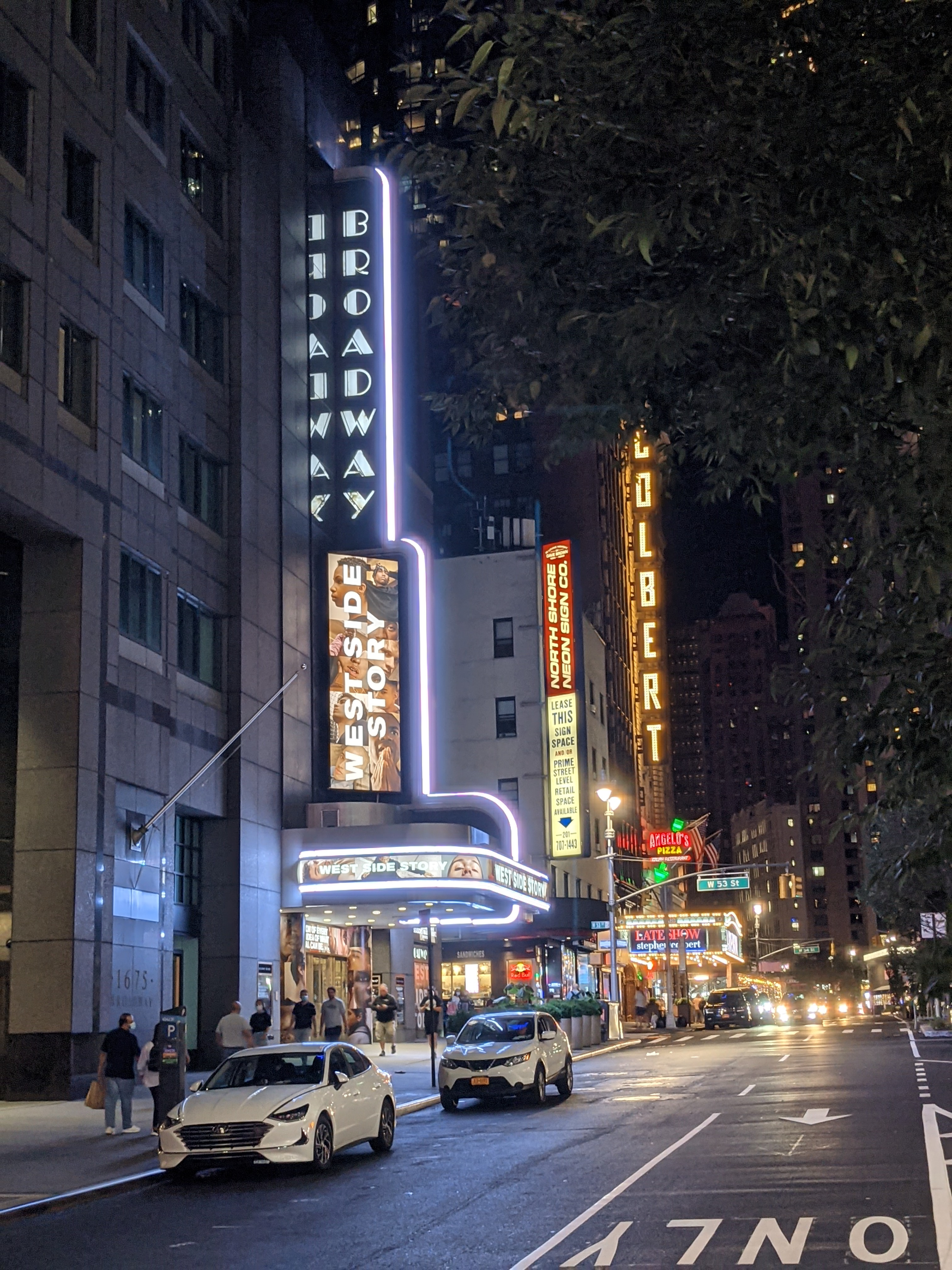
Marquee of the Broadway Theatre during the 2020 Broadway revival

A Broadway revival of West Side Story began previews on December 10, 2019, and officially opened on February 20, 2020, at the Broadway Theatre. It was directed by Ivo van Hove, with choreography by Anne Teresa De Keersmaeker and was produced by Scott Rudin, Barry Diller and David Geffen. The cast included Shereen Pimentel as Maria, Isaac Cole Powell as Tony, Amar Ramasar as Bernardo, Thomas Jay Ryan as Lt. Schrank and Yesenia Ayala as Anita. Scenic and lighting design were by Jan Versweyveld, with costumes by An d'Huys.

The production cut the song "I Feel Pretty" and trimmed the book to one hour and forty-five minutes (with no intermission). The setting was "loosely updated to the present", and direction was "determined to snuff out any lightness that might temper the full-blown tragedy to come". The original balletic, finger snapping choreography was replaced by swaggering, hip-hop and Latin-influenced dancing. The set consisted mostly of large screens featuring video, several cast members carried iPhones, and the Jets were not all white. Some theatergoers felt that the set turned the theatre into a cinema, but critic Charles McNulty argued that it wove technology into a multimedia "performance work that defies our usual vocabulary". The production also drew criticism for its casting of Ramasar, who had been accused of sexually inappropriate behavior and was fired from the New York City Ballet and suspended from Carousel, as well as the graphic staging of the Jets' assault and attempted rape of Anita which, together, "sends a message that women's bodies are collateral damage in male artistic success". Van Hove's casting of African American Jets, "dangerously, shifts our focus away from the enduring problem of white supremacist violence". While praising the cast, except for Ramasar, Alexandra Schwartz, writing in The New Yorker, felt that the use of the videos "dwarfs the actors with their own gigantic images... the technique is banal", while the mixed casting of the Jets creates "a bitter, unintended irony in the context of African-American history".

March 11, 2020, was the show's last performance before production was suspended due to the COVID-19 pandemic. Because of its opening date, it was not eligible for 2020 Tony Award consideration. The production did not reopen, and so its total run was 78 previews and 24 performances.

=== Other notable US productions and tours ===
The New York City Center Light Opera Company production played for a limited engagement of 31 performances from April 8 to May 3, 1964. The cast featured Don McKay (Tony), Julia Migenes (Maria) and Luba Lisa (Anita). It was staged by Gerald Freedman with choreography re-mounted by Tom Abbott. The Musical Theater of Lincoln Center and Richard Rodgers production opened at the New York State Theater, Lincoln Center, in June 1968 and closed in September after 89 performances. Direction and choreography were reproduced by Lee Theodore, and scenery was by Oliver Smith. Tony was played by Kurt Peterson, with Victoria Mallory as Maria. A 1987 US tour starred Jack Wagner as Tony, with Valarie Pettiford as Anita and was directed by Alan Johnson.

A national tour, directed by Alan Johnson, was produced in 2002. A national tour of the 2009 Broadway revival began in October 2010 at the Fisher Theatre in Detroit, Michigan, and toured for two seasons. The cast featured Kyle Harris as Tony and Ali Ewoldt as Maria. Chicago Lyric Opera staged the musical in 2019 and again in 2023, directed by Francesca Zambello and choreographed by Joshua Bergasse; Ryan McCartan starred as Tony in 2023. At the Washington National Opera in 2026, McCartan and Pimentel reprised the roles of Tony and Maria.

The musical has also been adapted to be performed as Deaf Side Story using both English and American Sign Language, with deaf Sharks and hearing Jets.

=== International productions ===
The first Australian production opened in October 1960 at the Princess Theatre in Melbourne, before touring to the Tivoli Theatre in Sydney in February 1961. Subsequent Australian tours have been staged in 1983, 1994, 2010 and twice in 2019. It returned to Handa Opera on Sydney Harbour in 2024.

Staatstheater Nürnberg staged the first German production in 1972 in a German translation by Marcel Prawy which had been used for the first Austrian staging in 1968 at the Vienna Volksoper with Julia Migenes and Adolf Dallapozza, conducted by Lawrence Leonard. The first East German production took place in Leipzig in 1984 with Dagmar Schellenberger and Stephan Spiewok and the Gewandhaus Orchestra.

A 2000 Hong Kong production with Cantonese lyrics featured Paul Wong as Tony at the outdoor plaza of Hong Kong Cultural Centre. Canada's Stratford Shakespeare Festival performed West Side Story in 1999, starring Tyley Ross as Tony and Ma-Anne Dionisio as Maria, and again in 2009, The Austrian Bregenz Festival presented the musical in the German translation by Prawy in 2003 and 2004, directed by Francesca Zambello, followed by a German tour. An international tour (2005–2010), directed and choreographed by Joey McKneely played in Tokyo, Paris, Austria, Switzerland, Germany, Singapore, São Paulo, France, Taiwan, China, Italy, Rotterdam and Spain.

Novosibirsk Globus Theatre staged the musical in Russia in 2007 with conductor Keith Clark, a former pupil of Bernstein's, who also conducted the 2010 Moscow production. A French language adaptation, translated by Philippe Gobeille, opened in Montreal, Quebec, in March 2008. A Philippine version played in 2008 at the Meralco Theater. It featured Christian Bautista as Tony, Karylle and Joanna Ampil as Maria. In 2011, a Lima production was produced by "Preludio Asociación Cultural" with Marco Zunino as Tony, Rossana Fernández-Maldonado as Maria, Jesús Neyra as Bernardo, Tati Alcántara as Anita and Joaquín de Orbegoso as Riff.

A Japanese production was scheduled to run from November 2019 to January 2020, at the IHI Stage Around Tokyo, featuring a double cast with Mamoru Miyano and Shouta Aoi as Tony, and Kii Kitano and Rena Sasamoto as Maria, with Suzuko Mimori as Anita, Ryuji Kamiyama as Riff, and Masataka Nakagauchi as Bernardo. A South Korean production was set to run from November 2022 to February 2023 at the Chungmu Art Center in Seoul. Kim Junsu, Ko Eun-sung, and Park Kanghyun are cast as Tony, with Lee Jisoo and Han Jae-ah as Maria and Jung Taekwoon as Riff.

=== Planned productions ===
The National Theatre plans a revival for the Olivier Theatre from November 2027, co-directed by Marianne Elliott and Miranda Cromwell, with Robbins's choreography reproduced and adapted by Julio Monge, an artistic collaborator on the 2021 film.

== Critical reaction ==
The creators' innovations in dance, music and theatrical style drew enthusiastic reactions from the critics. Walter Kerr wrote in the New York Herald Tribune on September 27, 1957:

The radioactive fallout from West Side Story must still be descending on Broadway this morning. Director, choreographer, and idea-man Jerome Robbins has put together, and then blasted apart, the most savage, restless, electrifying dance patterns we've been exposed to in a dozen seasons .... the show rides with a catastrophic roar over the spider-web fire-escapes, the shadowed trestles, and the plain dirt battlegrounds of a big city feud ... there is fresh excitement in the next debacle, and the next. When a gang leader advises his cohorts to play it "Cool", the intolerable tension between an effort at control and the instinctive drives of these potential killers is stingingly graphic. When the knives come out, and bodies begin to fly wildly through space under buttermilk clouds, the sheer visual excitement is breathtaking .... Mr. Bernstein has permitted himself a few moments of graceful, lingering melody: in a yearning "Maria", in the hushed falling line of "Tonight", in the wistful declaration of "I Have a Love". But for the most part he has served the needs of the onstage threshing machine ... When hero Larry Kert is stomping out the visionary insistence of "Something's Coming" both music and tumultuous story are given their due. Otherwise it's the danced narrative that takes urgent precedence ...

The other reviews generally joined in speculation about how the new work would influence the course of musical theater. Typical was John Chapman's review in the New York Daily News on September 27, 1957, headed: "West Side Story a Splendid and Super-Modern Musical Drama".

The American theatre took a venturesome forward step when the firm of Griffith & Prince presented West Side Story at the Winter Garden last evening. This is a bold new kind of musical theatre – a juke-box Manhattan opera. It is, to me, extraordinarily exciting ... the manner of telling the story is a provocative and artful blend of music, dance and plot – and the music and the dancing are superb. In [the score], there is the drive, the bounce, the restlessness and the sweetness of our town. It takes up the American musical idiom where it was left when George Gershwin died. It is fascinatingly tricky and melodically beguiling, and it marks the progression of an admirable composer ...

Time magazine found the dance and gang warfare more compelling than the love story and noted that the show's "putting choreography foremost, may prove a milestone in musical-drama history". One writer noted: "The story appealed to society's undercurrent of rebellion from authority that surfaced in 1950s films like Rebel Without a Cause. ... Robbins' energetic choreography and Bernstein's grand score accentuated the satiric, hard-edged lyrics of Sondheim, and Laurents' capture of the angry voice of urban youth. The play was criticized for glamorizing gangs, and its portrayal of Puerto Ricans and lack of authentic Latin casting were weaknesses. Yet, the same writer commented, the song "America" shows the triumph of the spirit over the obstacles often faced by immigrants. The musical also made points in its description of troubled youth and the devastating effects of poverty and racism. Juvenile delinquency is seen as an ailment of society: "No one wants a fella with a social disease!" The writer concluded: "On the cusp of the 1960s, American society, still recovering from the enormous upheaval of World War II, was seeking stability and control".

== Score ==
Bernstein's score for West Side Story blends "jazz, Latin rhythms, symphonic sweep and musical-comedy conventions in groundbreaking ways for Broadway". It was orchestrated by Sid Ramin and Irwin Kostal following detailed instructions from Bernstein, who then wrote revisions on their manuscript (the original, heavily annotated by Ramin, Kostal and Bernstein, is in the Rare Books and Manuscripts Library at Columbia University). Ramin, Kostal and Bernstein are billed as orchestrators for the show. The original orchestra consisted of 31 players: a large Broadway pit orchestra enhanced to include 5 percussionists.

In 1960, Bernstein prepared a suite of orchestral music from the show, the Symphonic Dances from West Side Story. It consists of nine movements: Prologue (Allegro moderato), "Somewhere" (Adagio), Scherzo (Vivace e leggero), Mambo (Meno presto), Cha-Cha (Andantino con grazia), Meeting Scene (Meno mosso), "Cool" Fugue (Allegretto), Rumble (Molto allegro), and Finale (Adagio). It premiered on February 13, 1961, at Carnegie Hall with the New York Philharmonic conducted by Lukas Foss. The suite was later included as bonus tracks on the original Broadway cast recording.

== Analysis of the book ==
As in Romeo and Juliet, the love between members of two rival groups in West Side Story leads to violent confrontations "and a tragic ending with an underlying message: Violence breeds violence, so make peace and learn to share turf". Among the social themes explored in the musical are "bigotry, cultural misunderstanding and the social failure to fully integrate and empower young people in constructive ways".

Misha Berson names four key differences from Romeo and Juliet in the musical: the feud derives from cultural difference; the plot omits the parents and former romances; the assault on Anita leads her to withhold the news of Maria's death from Tony; and Maria survives at the end. Carla Della Gatta adds an additional three: the Jets are the holders of public space (whereas the Capulets begin Shakespeare's play); Tony does not kill Chino (whereas Romeo kills Paris); and Chino kills Tony (whereas Paris does not kill Romeo).

== Recordings ==
=== Cast albums ===
Recordings of West Side Story include cast albums of the 1957 and 2009 Broadway productions and foreign productions sung in other languages, as well as live concert versions and studio albums. The 1958 West End production never released a cast album, but many of its stars recorded excerpts of the work across several recordings. Bernstein conducted the New York Philharmonic for a 1985 studio recording released by Deutsche Grammophon led by opera singers José Carreras and Kiri Te Kanawa. It won the Grammy Award for Best Cast Show Album in 1986, and a television documentary about the making of that album won the BAFTA Award for Best Documentary the same year. The 2009 cast album won the same Grammy award in 2010.

=== Film soundtracks ===
West Side Story was adapted into films released in 1961 and 2021, and soundtrack albums were released for both movies.

=== Other albums ===
The musical's score has also been adapted by music arrangers and musical ensembles for albums over the decades. Bernstein arranged music from the show into a suite titled Symphonic Dances from West Side Story, which has been recorded several times. The 1961 jazz album Kenton's West Side Story, by Stan Kenton and the Stan Kenton Orchestra, won the 1962 Grammy Award for Best Large Jazz Ensemble Album. A 2013 concert recording by the San Francisco Symphony was nominated for a Grammy Award.

== Films ==
=== 1961 ===
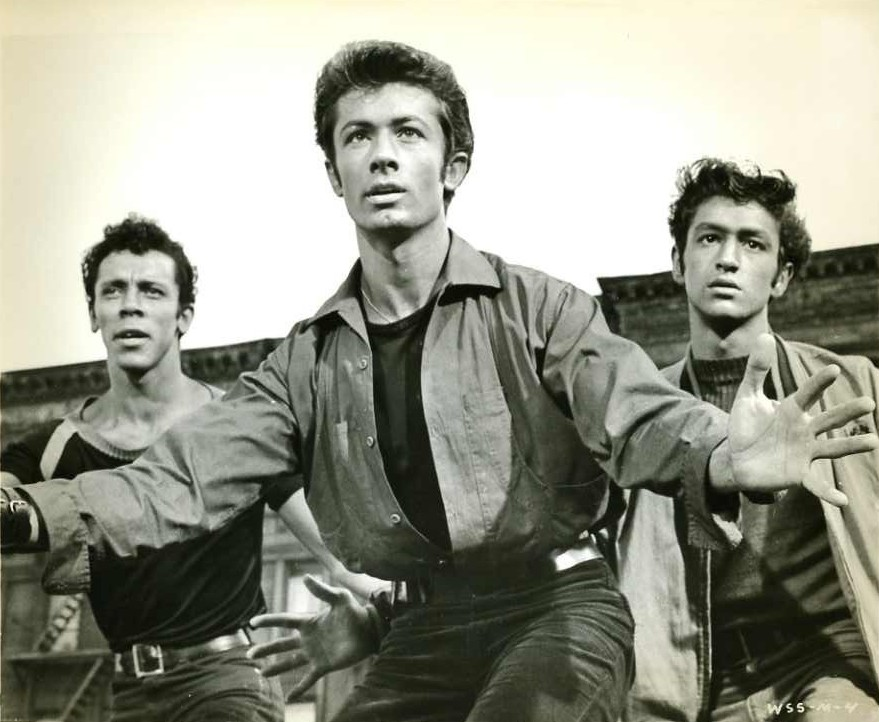
George Chakiris as Bernardo in the 1961 film adaptation with Jay Norman (Pepe), left and Eddie Verso (Juano), right

The 1961 film adaptation of the musical received praise from critics and the public and became the second-highest-grossing film of the year in the United States. The film won ten Academy Awards in its eleven nominated categories, including Best Picture. It received the most Academy Awards (10 wins) of any musical film, including Best Picture. Rita Moreno, as Anita, was the first Latina actress ever to win an Oscar. The soundtrack album won a Grammy Award and was ranked No. 1 on the Billboard chart for a record 54 weeks. Differences in the film from the stage version include moving "Tonight" to follow "America" and "I Feel Pretty" to precede the rumble. Diesel is renamed Ice. "Gee, Officer Krupke" is moved before "Cool" and is sung by Riff instead of Action, and "Cool" is sung by Ice instead of Riff. After Riff is killed, Ice takes control of the Jets, rather than Action.

=== 1979 ===
A 1979 Egyptian adaptation (Arabic: قصة الحي الغربي transliterated as Quessat al-Ay al-Gharby) was directed by Adel Sadeq based on the musical and the 1961 film. The cast features Hussein Fahmy as Sami, Soheir Ramzi as Amal, Samir Ghanem as Talib, Hassan Youssef as Recep, Saeed Saleh and Soheir Zaki.

=== 2021 ===
A 2021 film adaptation, written by Tony Kushner, directed by Steven Spielberg and choreographed by Justin Peck, is based more closely on the Broadway musical than the 1961 film. The cast includes Ansel Elgort as Tony, newcomer Rachel Zegler as Maria, Ariana DeBose as Anita and Mike Faist as Riff. Moreno, who played Anita in the 1961 film, plays Valentina, a reconceived and expanded version of the character Doc, who serves as a mentor to the teenage characters, and sings "Somewhere" in this version. A new Black character, Abe, makes the cast "more representative of ... 1950s New York". Peck's choreography does not attempt to replicate Robbins' choreography. "Gee, Officer Krupke" and "Cool" are performed in the first half; "One Hand, One Heart" appears in between the two. The film received seven nominations at the 94th Academy Awards, including Best Picture, winning one Oscar for DeBose's performance.

== References in popular culture ==
The television show Curb Your Enthusiasm extensively referenced West Side Story in the 2009 season seven episode "Officer Krupke". In the third season of the series Glee, three episodes feature characters auditioning, rehearsing and performing a school production of West Side Story. The 2005 short musical comedy film West Bank Story, which won the Academy Award for Best Live Action Short Film, concerns a love story between a Jew and a Palestinian and parodies several aspects of West Side Story.

In 1963, the magazine Mad published "East Side Story" which was set at the United Nations building on the East Side of Manhattan, a parody of the Cold War, with the two rival gangs led by John F. Kennedy and Nikita Khrushchev, by writer Frank Jacobs and illustrator Mort Drucker. In the Discworld series of books by Terry Pratchett, two feuding noble families are named Selachii and Venturi, the scientific names for "sharks" and "jets".

From 1973 to 2004, Wild Side Story, a camp parody musical, based loosely on West Side Story and adapting parts of the musical's music and lyrics, was performed a total of more than 500 times in Miami Beach, Florida, Stockholm, Gran Canaria and Los Angeles. The show lampoons the musical's tragic love story, and also lip-synching and drag shows.

== Awards and nominations ==
=== Original Broadway production ===
Year	Award ceremony	Category	Nominee	Result
1958	Theatre World Award		Carol Lawrence	Won
1958	Tony Awards	Best Musical		Nominated
1958	Tony Awards	Best Featured Actress in a Musical	Carol Lawrence	Nominated
1958	Tony Awards	Best Choreography	Jerome Robbins	Won
1958	Tony Awards	Best Scenic Design	Oliver Smith	Won
1958	Tony Awards	Best Costume Design	Irene Sharaff	Nominated
1958	Tony Awards	Best Conductor and Musical Director	Max Goberman	Nominated

=== 1964 Broadway revival ===
Year	Award ceremony	Category	Nominee	Result
1964	Tony Award	Best Producer of a Musical	City Center Light Opera Company	Nominated
1964	Tony Award	Best Conductor and Musical Director	Charles Jaffe	Nominated

=== 1980 Broadway revival ===
Year	Award ceremony	Category	Nominee	Result
1980	Tony Award	Best Revival		Nominated
1980	Tony Award	Best Performance by an Actress in a Featured Role in a Musical	Josie de Guzman	Nominated
1980	Tony Award	Best Performance by an Actress in a Featured Role in a Musical	Debbie Allen	Nominated
1980	Drama Desk Award	Outstanding Featured Actress in a Musical	Debbie Allen	Won

=== 2009 Broadway revival ===
Year	Award ceremony	Category	Nominee	Result
2009	Tony Award	Best Revival of a Musical		Nominated
2009	Tony Award	Best Performance by an Actress in a Lead Role in a Musical	Josefina Scaglione	Nominated
2009	Tony Award	Best Performance by an Actress in a Featured Role in a Musical	Karen Olivo	Won
2009	Tony Award	Best Lighting Design	Howell Binkley	Nominated
2009	Drama Desk Award	Outstanding Revival of a Musical		Nominated
2009	Drama Desk Award	Outstanding Featured Actress in a Musical	Karen Olivo	Nominated
2009	Theatre World Award		Josefina Scaglione	Won

=== 2020 Broadway revival ===
Year	Award	Category	Nominee	Result
2020	Drama Desk Awards	Outstanding Revival of a Musical		Nominated
2020	Drama Desk Awards	Outstanding Featured Actress in a Musical	Yesenia Ayala	Nominated
2020	Drama Desk Awards	Outstanding Choreography	Anne Teresa De Keersmaeker	Nominated
2020	Drama Desk Awards	Outstanding Orchestrations	Jonathan Tunick	Nominated
2020	Drama Desk Awards	Outstanding Projection Design	Luke Halls	Won
2020	Drama Desk Awards	Outstanding Sound Design in a Musical	Tom Gibbons	Nominated
