= Cool (West Side Story song) =

1957 song composed by Leonard Bernstein

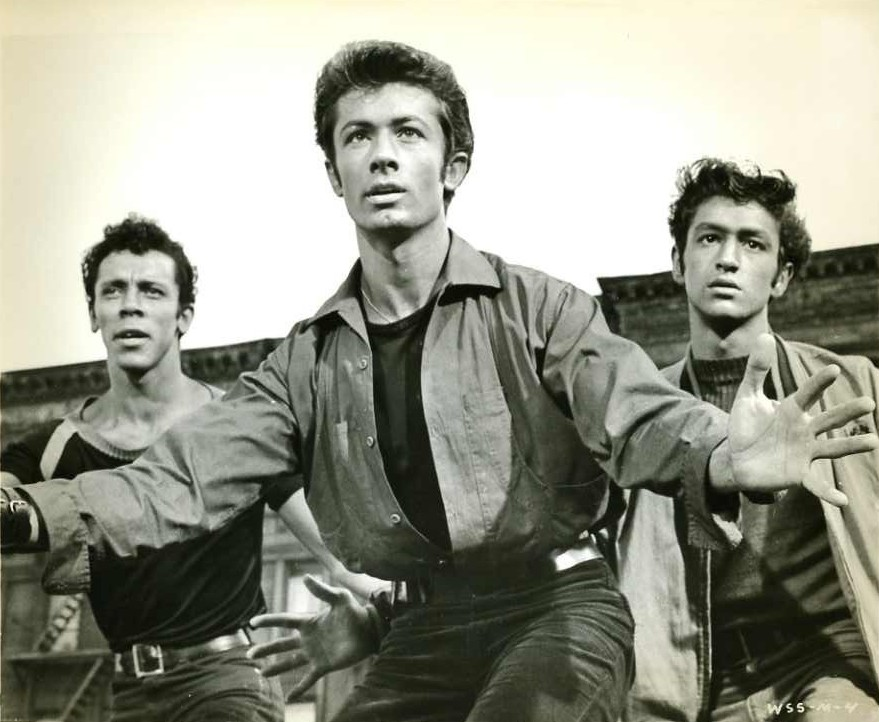
George Chakiris as Bernardo in the 1961 film adaptation with Jay Norman (Pepe), left and Eddie Verso (Juano), right

"Cool" is a song from the 1957 musical West Side Story. Leonard Bernstein composed the music and Stephen Sondheim wrote the lyrics. This was the first song they wrote together, and Sondheim later recollected that Bernstein must have written the opening line ("Boy, boy, crazy boy") since he himself was not prone to writing melismatically. This song is known for its fugal treatment of a jazz figure, described by one writer as "possibly the most complex instrumental music heard on Broadway to date". In the 1957 musical, the song is performed by Riff as he advises the Jets to stay cool before entering the Rumble. This is however changed in the 1961 and 2021 film adaptations.

== Summary in the 1961 film ==
In the aftermath of the rumble with the Sharks and Riff (Russ Tamblyn)’s death, the Jets go into hiding and re-converge in secret. When the short-tempered Action (Tony Mordente) becomes dead set on taking the fight to the Sharks, Ice (Tucker Smith) takes command and warns him and the others to keep their grief and anger in check if they don’t want police attention.

== Summary in the 2021 film ==
Hours before the rumble, Tony (Ansel Elgort) learns that Riff (Mike Faist) is planning to bring a pistol and urges him to call the rumble off, attempting to confiscate the gun while the rest of the Jets play Keep Away with it.

== In popular culture ==
In 2011, actor Harry Shum Jr. performed the song as his character Mike Chang from the TV series Glee, in the third episode of season 3, "Asian F" (aired on October 4).

An episode of Animaniacs features a parody version as "Coo Bird" sung by Bobby of The Goodfeathers. The song is also parodied in the Flight of the Conchords episode "The Tough Brets" with the song "Stay Cool, Bret".

The Castle episode "Cool Boys" has Richard Castle and Detective Slaughter sing it to distract some criminals holding them at gunpoint.

British sketch show Horrible Histories parodied this song as a song about the English Civil War.
