= Rudy Del Campo =

American dancer, actor, and restaurateur (1927–2003)

Rudy del Campo
- Born: Rudolph Martin del Campo; April 21, 1927; Los Angeles, California, U.S.
- Died: August 28, 2003; Los Angeles, California, U.S.
- Known for: Dance, acting
- Movement: Musical theatre, Film musicals
- Spouse(s): Helen Silver (m. 1953–1968); Nina del Campo (m. 1965)
- Children: Robert del Campo; Lisamaria del Campo; Mitchell del Campo; Jennifer del Campo
- Parent(s): Alberto Martín del Campo; Concepción Castellanos

Rudolph Martin del Campo (21 April 1927 – 28 August 2003), known professionally as Rudy del Campo, was an American dancer, actor, and restaurateur. He appeared as a dancer in Hollywood musical films during the 1950s and early 1960s, including West Side Story (1961), before leaving the entertainment industry to co-found the Los Angeles restaurant Casita del Campo in 1962.

== Early life and family ==
Del Campo was born in Los Angeles, California, on 21 April 1927, to Alberto Martín del Campo and Concepción Castellanos. His parents were both born in Guadalajara, Jalisco, Mexico, and married there in 1915 before later migrating to the United States.

Although born in the United States, del Campo spent a significant part of his childhood living in Mexico with extended family. Later accounts note that during this period he developed an early interest in American musical films, particularly those starring Fred Astaire, which influenced his decision to pursue a career in dance.

He had several siblings, including Beatriz del Campo, who later collaborated with him in business, and Oscar Medardo del Campo Castellanos (1936–2014).

== Dance and acting career ==
After returning to Los Angeles, del Campo trained as a dancer and began performing professionally in the early 1950s. By 1951, he was a member of the Lee Scott Dancers, a Los Angeles–based dance troupe composed largely of students from Edith Jane's dance classes. A contemporary article in the Los Angeles Evening Citizen-News lists del Campo among the troupe's performers alongside Helen Silver, Betty Evans, Charles Miller, and Lee Scott. The group appeared regularly at Hollywood nightclubs and other Southern California venues.

In 1955, del Campo appeared on Broadway as a dancer in the musical The Vamp, which played at the Winter Garden Theatre. The production ran from November to December 1955 and featured choreography by Jack Cole. Contemporary theatre databases list del Campo among the show's ensemble dancers.

Del Campo later appeared as a dancer in major Hollywood musical productions. His most notable screen appearance was as one of the Sharks in the 1961 film adaptation of West Side Story. He also appeared as an uncredited dancer in A Star Is Born (1954), starring Judy Garland, and in other large-scale studio musicals of the period.

By the early 1960s, del Campo began stepping away from full-time performing.

== Military service ==
At the age of eighteen, he was drafted into the United States Army during the Korean War period. Prior to being drafted, del Campo was employed by Western Insulated Wire Company in Los Angeles. He served for approximately two years and received training in field artillery. During his service, he also worked as a projectionist, screening educational and public-health films for servicemen.

== Casita del Campo ==
In 1962, del Campo, his first wife Helen del Campo (née Silver), and his sister Beatriz purchased a small bungalow at 1920 Hyperion Avenue in the Silver Lake area of Los Angeles and opened Casita del Campo.

Drawing on their backgrounds in show business, the founders installed a stage and regularly booked musicians, singers, comedians, and dancers. Contemporary newspaper columns described del Campo tending bar, developing signature cocktails, and greeting patrons personally.

Throughout the 1960s, Casita del Campo expanded to include multiple dining rooms, a cocktail lounge, a patio, and later The Cavern Club, a basement performance space. Contemporary sources described Casita del Campo as a gathering place for members of the entertainment and dance communities. Regular patrons mentioned in the Los Angeles Evening Citizen-News included actors and dancers such as George Chakiris, Juliet Prowse, choreographer Hermes Pan, and dancer Andre Tayir. Later accounts also noted that actor Rock Hudson was among those who dined at the restaurant.

Members of the del Campo family were involved in the restaurant's operation. Newspaper coverage from the mid-1960s identified del Campo's brother Oscar Martin del Campo as the restaurant's general manager.

== Personal life ==
Del Campo married dancer Helen Silver in 1953. The couple worked together professionally and later co-owned Casita del Campo. Their marriage ended in divorce in 1968.

In 1965, del Campo met Colombian-born Nina del Campo, who had begun working as a waitress at Casita del Campo. The two later married and had four children: Robert, Lisamaria, Mitchell, and Jennifer del Campo.

Their son Robert del Campo (born 1967) later assumed responsibility for managing Casita del Campo.

== Death ==
Del Campo died on 28 August 2003 in Los Angeles, California.
