= N.Y. Export: Opus Jazz =

Ballet

N.Y. Export: Opus Jazz is a jazz ballet made by Jerome Robbins, subsequently ballet master of New York City Ballet (NYCB) to music of the same title by Robert Prince. The premiere took place on 8 June 1958 at the Festival of the Two Worlds in Spoleto, performed by Ballets: USA and subsequently on Broadway. The NYCB premiere was on 29 April 2005 at the New York State Theater, Lincoln Center, with scenery by Ben Shahn, costumes by Florence Klutz and lighting by Jennifer Tipton.

== Casts ==
=== Original Spoleto ===
- Patricia Dunn
- Wilma Curley
- Sondra Lee
- Gwen Lewis
- Erin Martin
- Barbra Milberg
- Beryl Towbin
- Joan Van Orden
- Jay Norman
- Tom Abbott
- Bob Bakanic
- John Mandia
- James White
- John Jones
- James Moore
- staged by Edward Verso

American Ballet Theatre premiere August 25, 1982 Mann Music Center Philadelphia, Pennsylvania

- Restaged with the assistance of Tom Abbott and Wilma Curley
- Scenery by Ben Shahn
- Costumes by Ben Shahn and Florence Klotz
- Lighting by Jennifer Tipton

Cast:

- Lisa Rineheart
- David Cuevas
- Susan Jaffe
- Robert La Fosse
- Elaine Kudo
- Peter Fonseca
- John Gardner
- Lisa de Rebere
- Alina Hernandez
- Brian Adams
- Lawrence Pech

=== NYCB premiere ===
- Ellen Bar
- Rebecca Krohn
- Ashley Laracey
- Georgina Pazcoguin
- Tiler Peck
- Sara Ricard
- Rachel Rutherford
- Stephanie Zungre
- Antonio Carmena
- Adrian Danchig-Waring
- Craig Hall
- Adam Hendrickson
- Seth Orza
- Amar Ramasar
- Sean Suozzi
- Andrew Veyette

== Articles ==
- DANCE VIEW; City Ballet, at the Boiling Point, NY Times by Anna Kisselgoff, July 2, 1995

== Reviews ==
- NY Times, Anna Kisselgoff, April 28, 2005
- NY Times, July 14, 1961
- NY Times, John Martin, October 29, 1961
