= Mokhovaya Street (Saint Petersburg) =

Street in Saint Petersburg, Russia

Coordinates: 59°56′32.20″N 30°20′43.12″E

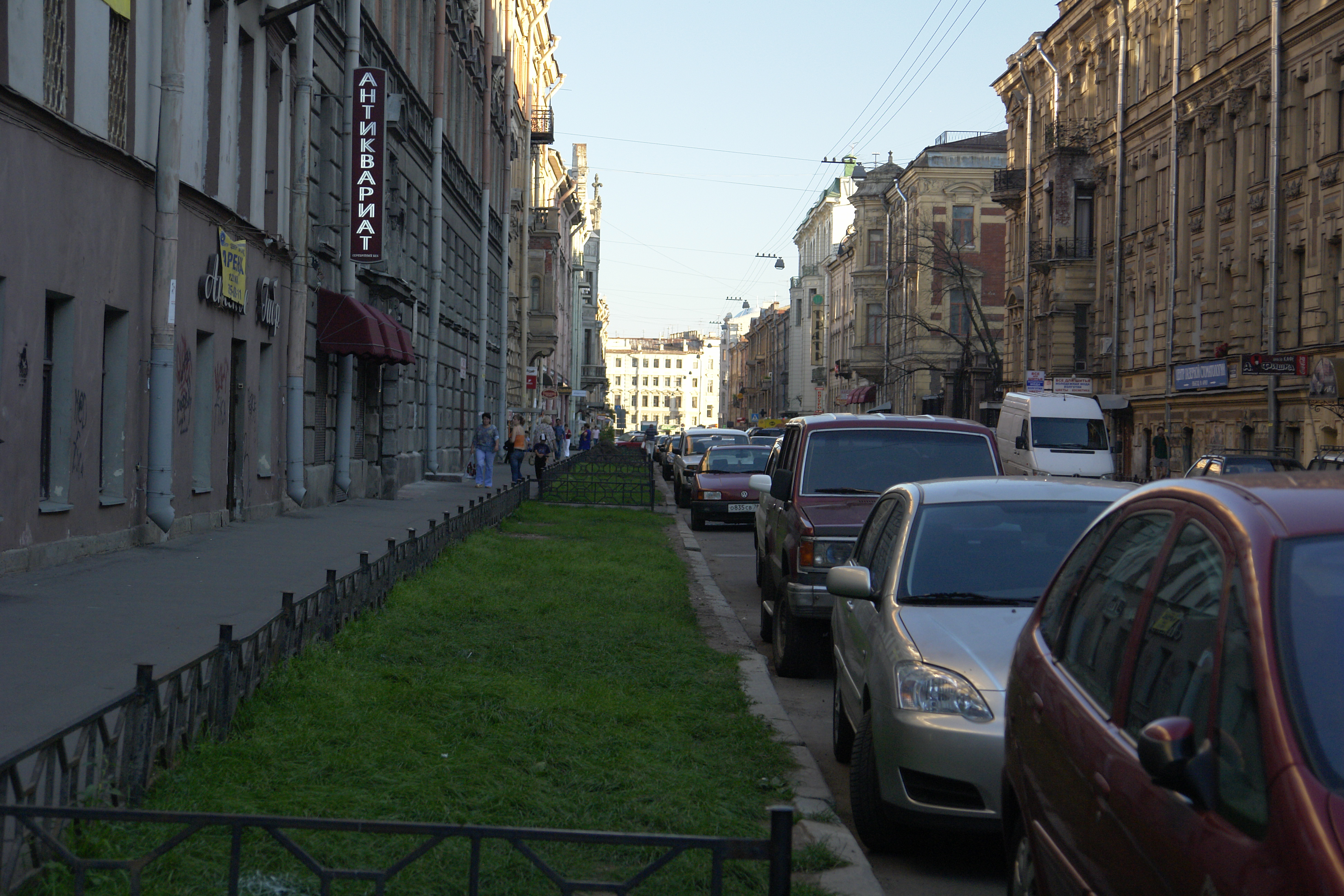
- View from Pestelya Street
- Interactive map of Mokhovaya Street
- Native name: Моховая улица (Russian)
- Length: 920 m (3,020 ft)

Mokhovaya Street is a street in Saint Petersburg, Russia. The avenue runs from the Chaykovskogo Street to Belinskogo Street for approximately 920 m. The street has high socio-cultural value due to numerous historical buildings and monuments of the 18th-20th centuries.

== Etymology ==
The modern street's name Mokhovaya is a derivative from Chamovaya, which dates back to 1720s, when the local road ran along the Chamovnicheskian Sloboda (the weavers' settlement, where workers from the Wharf and the Admiralty lived). It was granted the status of a city street in 1757, and the name Mokhovaya became official in 1826.

== History ==
In the early 18th century, the territory of modern Mokhovaya street was swampland and covered by forest. The land was drained and cultivated to allow the construction of the first city Wharf. Soon, the Chamovnicheskian sloboda was established here. Originally inhabited by weavers, with time it grew and was inhabited by soldiers, officers, Court cooks, beer and kvas brewers. Also, the first city builders lived here, from clerks to architects and employees of the Royal City and Garden Construction Bureau.

By the late 18th century, the social strata of local inhabitants changed to more wealthy citizens like prosperous merchants and even some noblemen, such as the Stroganovs, the Skvaronskys, the Vorontsovs, etc. In 1834, the historian Aleksandr Bashutsky called the Liteyny district (that includes Mokhovaya street) "the tsardom of a most exquisite circle, inhabited by creme de la creme of modern high society". The central, but quiet and cozy street attracted many literary and scientific figures, who rented apartments here.

Until the mid 19th century, the street still had some small wooden houses (1-2 storeys high), the pavements were also made of wood and sided by the shallow drains. Water pipes were installed in the 1840-1860s, the carriageway was cobbled in the mid 18th century. Every household was in charge of the street section next to its house. In the 1830s, the cobbles were replaced by timber blocks, which significantly reduced the noise from horse carriages. The asphalt covering of the road was made in the 1930s.

In the mid 19th century, the city government prohibited construction of wooden buildings facing the main streets, so the look of the street began to change. Many prominent architects like Ippolit Monighetti, Victor Schröter, Leon Benois, and Fyodor Lidval constructed impressive private mansions and revenue houses on Mokhovaya Street for noble families, such as the Obolenskys, the Skarzynskis, the Tolstoys, the Grabbes, the Dashkovs, etc. Most of them were built in the end of 19th - beginning of the 20th century.

The street remained largely unchanged during the Soviet period. Only four houses were constructed after the Russian Revolution in 1917, two buildings were topped with additional floors, but mainly the reconstructions spared the original appearance. In World War II a German bomb destroyed house No.23/10. The rest of the buildings were damaged mostly by improper usage. The restoration lasted for nearly a decade, from the mid 1940s to the mid 1950s. In that period, the central heating was changed from stove to steam, so the wood sheds in the courtyards were replaced by new stone house wings, children's playgrounds, and auxiliary buildings.

== Historical buildings and monuments ==
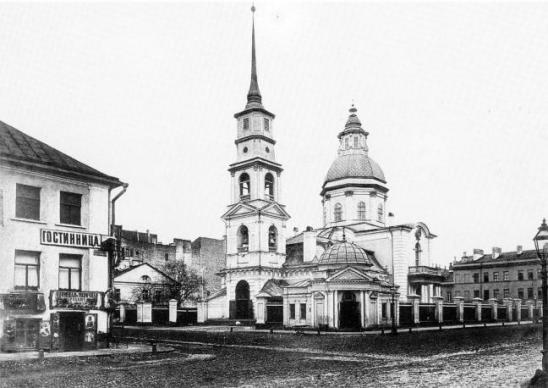
The Church of Simeon and Anna in the 1860s, Mokhovaya, 48

- No.3 — the nineteenth century mansion of Russian diplomat Mikhail Ustinov. The original building of the 1780s was reconstructed in the early 19th century by Aleksandr Poel, then rebuilt in 1875–1876 by Victor Schröter in vivid baroque style. From 1857 the writer Ivan Goncharov rented an apartment on the first floor.
- No.10 — the nineteenth century mansion was bought by Count Illarion Vorontsov-Dashkov in the early 1910s. In 1913-1914 Ivan Fomin reconstructed the interiors in Neoclassical style.
- No.15 — the mansion of M. V. Shtifter, reconstructed in 1912 by Ludomir-Flavian Khoynovsky in the baroque style. A building existed on this site as early as in 1748, it was expanded with court wings in the 1870s by Pavel Suzor.
- No.27-29 — The site of a four-storey mansion built in 1882 by architect Aleksandr Krasovsky for the Kornilov family. It was later rented by a women's private preparatory school. It was replaced in 1897–1898 by two modern revenue houses built by architect Leon Benois.
- No.34 — the mansion of N. V. Bezobrazova, wife of Russian general Vladimir Mikhailovich Bezobrazov, built in 1902-1904 by Jules-Louis-Auguste Benois and Aleksandr Vladovsky. After the Russian Revolution, in 1922 the building was given to the Bryantsev Youth Theatre, then in 1962 - to the Russian State Institute of Performing Arts.
- No. 33-35 — the former building of Tenishev's school. Count Vyacheslav Tenishev was a scientist and major philanthropist. He established his private school in 1898 and in 1900 moved it into the house built for it on Mokhovaya Street by engineer Richard Berzen. The school became one of the most respectable in the city. Among its graduates were Osip Mandelstam, Vladimir Nabokov, Vladimir Pozner and others.
- No.48 — the Church of Simeon and Anna, built in 1731–1734 by Mikhail Zemtsov and Johann Friedrich Blank. It replaced the wooden church of St Michael (1712–1714), built by order of Peter the Great in celebration of his daughter Anna's birthday.
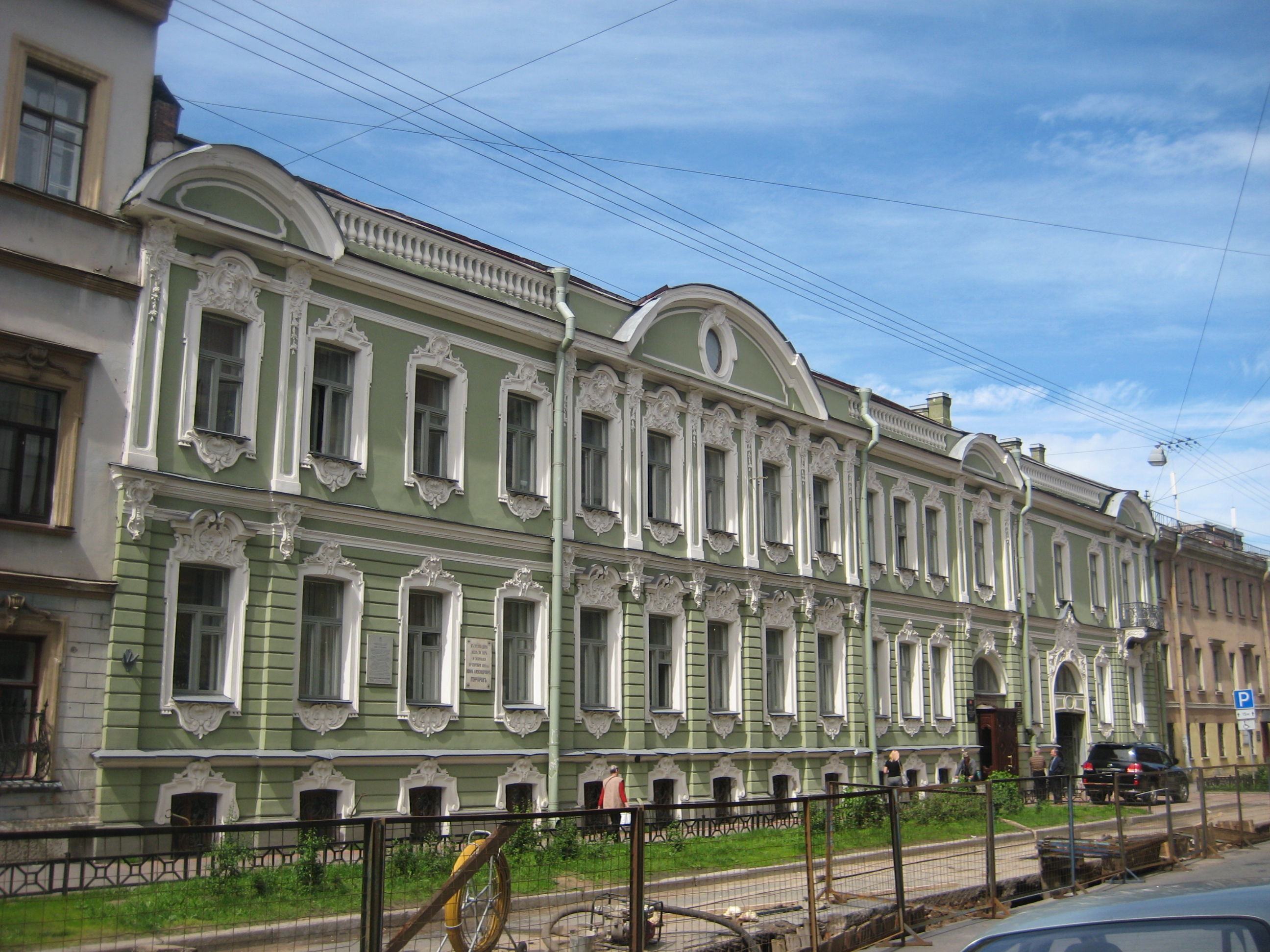
Mokhovaya, 3, Ustinov's mansion

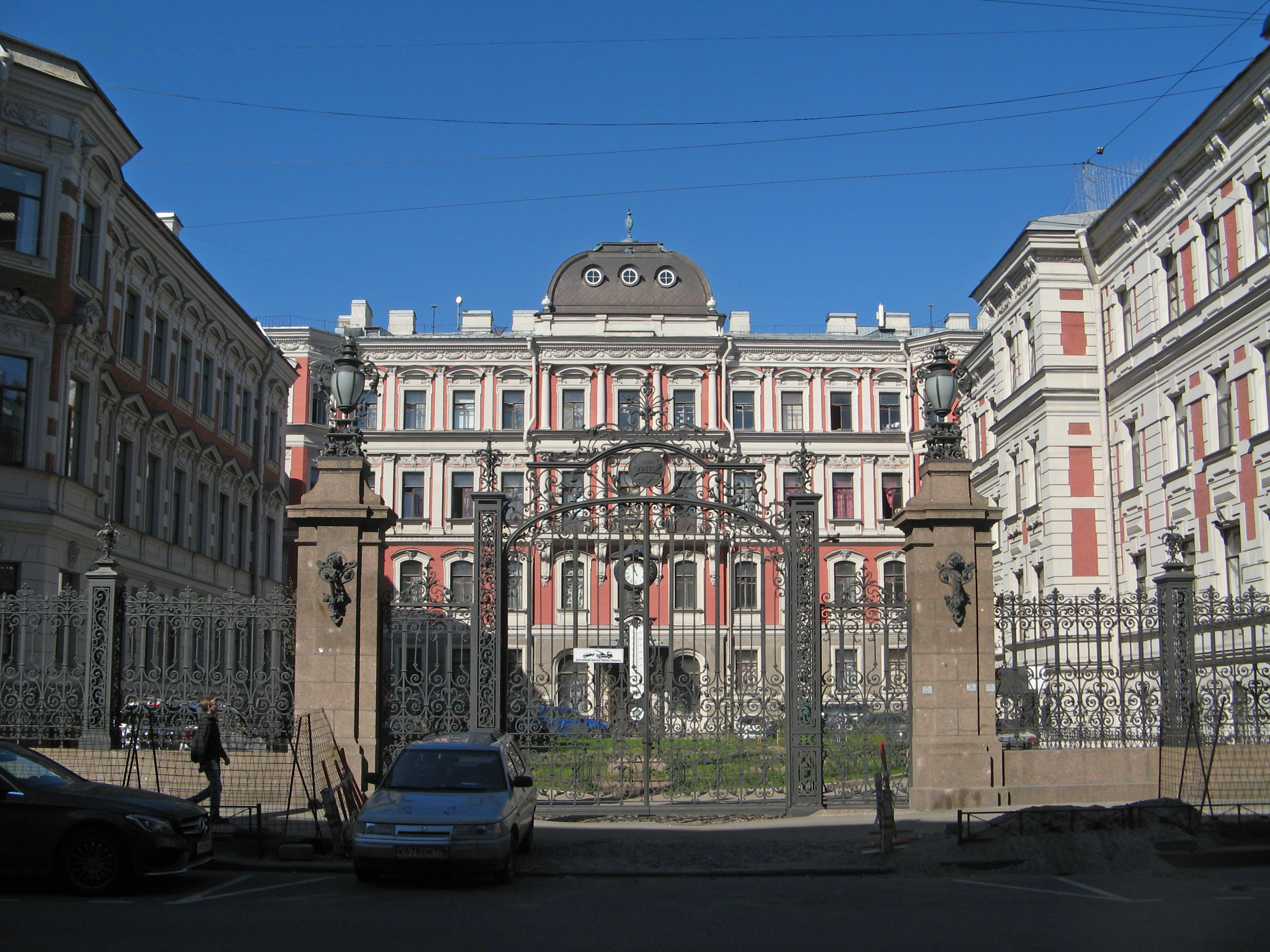
Mokhovaya, 27–29, Revenue houses of 'Rossiya' insurance society

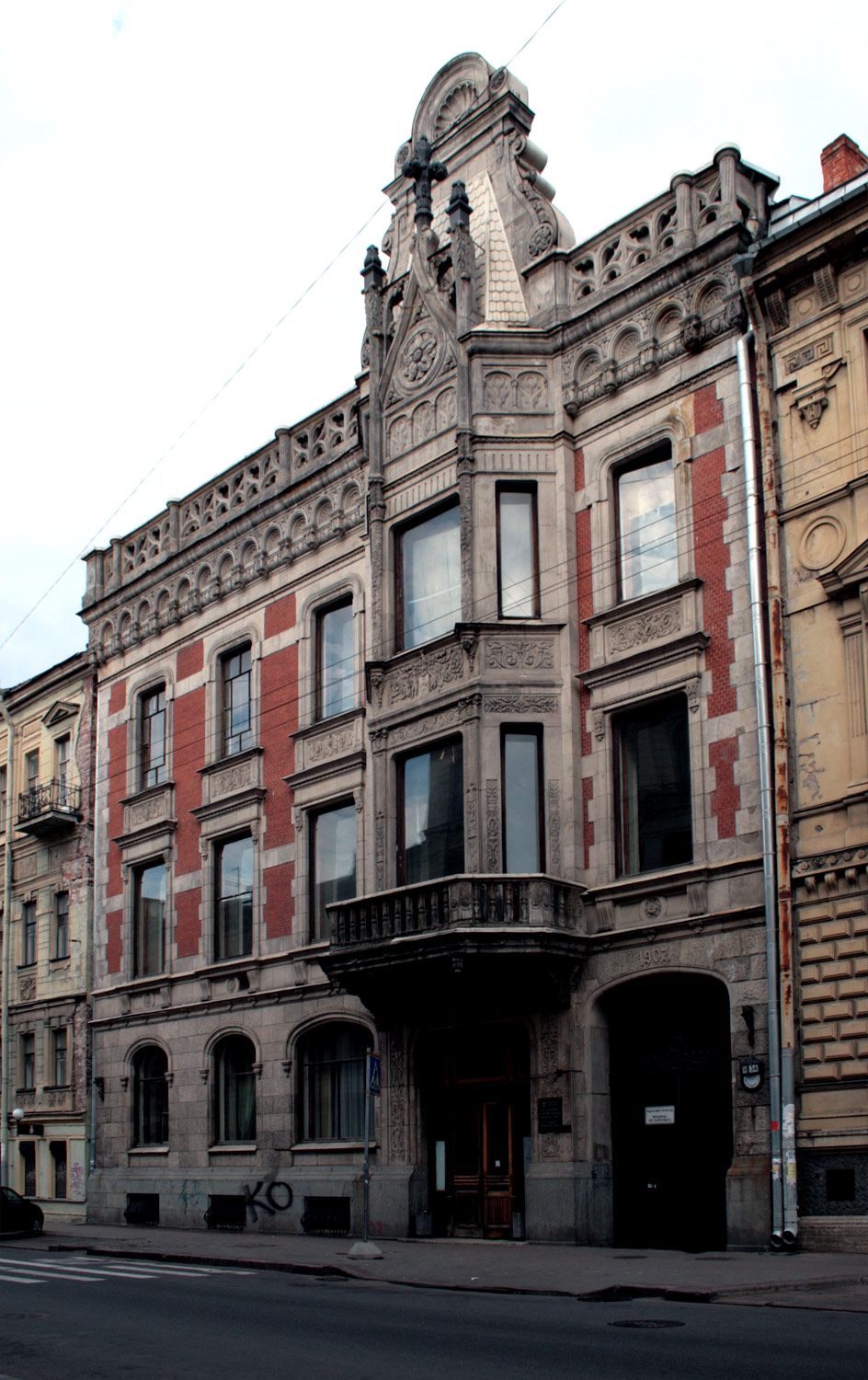
Mokhovaya, 34, State Theatre Arts Academy

== Sources ==
- Dubin, A.; Broytman, L. (2004). Моховая улица [Mokhovaya street] (in Russian). Moscow: Tsentrpoligraph. ISBN 5-9524-1031-6.
- Isachenko, V. (1998). Зодчие Санкт-Петербурга, XIX – начало XX века [St Petersburg Architects in XIX – Early XX Centuries]. St Petersburg: Lenizdat. ISBN 5-289-01586-8.
- Zhigalo, M. V.; Tukinyan, I. A. (2011). Самые известные храмы Санкт-Петербурга [The most famous churches of Saint Petersburg]. AST. ISBN 978-5-17-070319-7.
