= Alexander Meiselman =

Russian writer and poet (1900-1938)

Alexander Davidovich Meiselman
- Александр Давидович Мейсельман
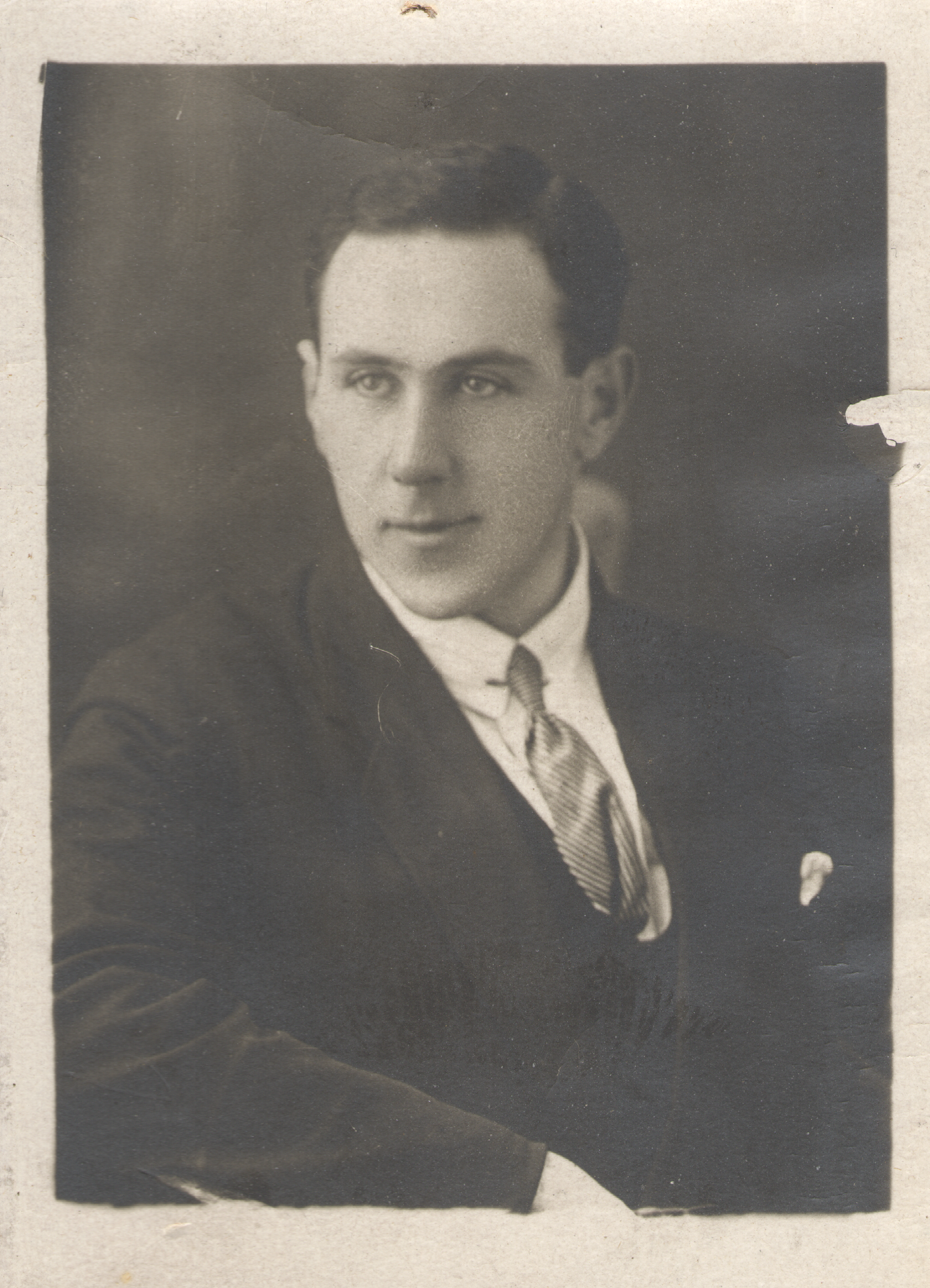
- Born: September 11, 1900; Tayga, Kemerovo Oblast, Russia
- Died: January 18, 1938 (aged 37); St Petersburg, Russia
- Resting place: Levashovo Memorial Cemetery (probably)
- Citizenship: Russian Empire, USSR
- Education: Irkutsk State University
- Occupations: Writer, poet, orientalist
- Spouse: Ekaterina Dmitrievna Tenner-Meyselman
- Children: Ksenia Alexandrovna Guzeeva
- Relatives: David Itskovich Mordkhov Meiselman (father) Aleksandra Leont'evna (Ginendel' Leibovna) Meiselman (mother)
- Writing career
- Language: Russian
- Genres: occupational novel, travel book
- Subjects: USSR, sea of Okhotsk, Kamchatka

Alexander Davidovich Meiselman (1900 – 1938) was a Soviet writer, poet, orientalist, and theatre historian.

== Biography ==
Alexander David Meiselman was born on the 11(24?) September 1900 in Tayga (formerly in the Mariinsk County of the Tomsk Province). He was the youngest of the nine children in the family. His father David Meiselman, who was a coachman, managed a post coach station on the Siberian Route.

After the death of his father in 1904 he was in the charge of his elder brother and went to a grammar school in Irkutsk. After he finished school in 1918, he entered the faculty of law of the Irkutsk State University, and in 1920 he changed the faculty for the faculty of Oriental Humanities (later renamed the Department of Far East International Relations of the Faculty of Social Sciences), from which he graduated as a specialist in Japanese in 1924. He specialised in oriental theatre.

In 1925 he moved to Leningrad, where at first, he worked as a technician and then an assistant at the department of the State Institute of the History of Arts. In 1926 he became the head of a Proletcult Workshop. He taught East European literature at the State Technical School of Printing, frequently went to Moscow to deliver lectures on oriental theatre at the Central School of Theatre Arts and delivered lectures on oriental theatre at the Leningrad Higher Courses of Art History.

In 1929 he worked as a Japanese interpreter in Kamchatka for the Kamchatka Joint Stock Company. The impressions of this work were reflected in the book The Lam: Essays of the Okhotsk-Kamchatka Region (1931).

In 1930 he became a postgraduate student at the State Institute of the History of Arts. He was recommended to be accepted there by Prof. Nikolai Iosifovich Konrad, who saw him as the only orientalist in the country who specialised in the history and theory of the theatre of the countries of the Far East.

During his postgraduate studies Meiselman began teaching the history of the theatre at the Leningrad Theatre School, and in 1934 he started working at the chair of the theatre history at the Leningrad State Institute of Advanced Training of Art Workers and also consulted specialists in the history of the theatre at the Moscow State Institute of Theatre Art.

He was a founding member of the Soviet Writers' Union in 1935.

He was close friends with N. Kalma (the pen name of Ann Kalmanok) and her husband Boris Gold, a professor and specialist in cars. He was also friends with Naum Berkovsky, a literary critic and specialist in literature, and Gennady Epiphanov, a graphic artist.

On the 15 October 1937 Meiselman was arrested by NKVD on false charges and was executed on 18 January 1938.

At the time of his arrest Alexander Meiselman was working at the Russian Academy of Arts as a professor teaching theatre history. His manuscript of the stories about Japanese children which was to be published in Detgis publishing house is supposed to have been destroyed after his arrest.

He was posthumously rehabilitated for lack of corpus delicti in 1956 and recognised as a victim of political terror in the USSR. In 2017 a memorial plate was installed on the house where he had lived at the time of his arrest.

== Creative work ==
Meiselman debuted in literature as a poet in a collective collection Otzvuki [Echoes] (1921, Irkutsk). Meiselman's earliest known poems date back to 1919. He was one of the founders of the first poetic association in South Siberia, the Irkutsk literary group called Barka Poetov [Barge of Poets] (1920-1923), and later a member and a board member of the Irkutsk literary and artistic Union (1923-1926).

He was aligned with the Barka Poetov Association, which was true to the classic traditions of Russian poetry. However, his poetic interludes in his late book Lam, written more like an industrial novel, are reminiscent of the avant-garde experiments of Barka Poetov. It was around then that his interest in poetics and aesthetics of the theatre started. In December 1922 he gave a talk on Alexander Blok's lyrical theatre. After arriving in Leningrad, he appeared in press mostly as an essayist and literary observer.
