= Tucker Smith =

American actor (1936–1988)

- As Ice in West Side Story
- Born: Thomas William Smith; April 24, 1936; Philadelphia, Pennsylvania, US
- Died: December 22, 1988 (aged 52); Los Angeles, California
- Occupations: Actor; dancer; singer
- Years active: 1955–1986
- Height: 6 ft 1 in (1.85 m)

Tucker Smith (born Thomas William Smith, April 24, 1936 – December 22, 1988) was an American actor, dancer, and singer who performed the role of Ice in the movie musical West Side Story.

== Life and career ==
Born in Philadelphia, Pennsylvania, to Thomas W. Smith and the former Evelyn Mae Walsh, Tucker Smith was an American Theatre Wing scholarship winner, and he first moved to New York City from his native Philadelphia in September 1955. Shortly afterward, he joined the national tour of Damn Yankees. In 1958, he joined the cast of the original Broadway production of West Side Story, as a replacement for the role of Big Deal, then going on to play the roles of Diesel and Snowboy. He understudied for the character of Riff and had played that role many times. The musical went on a national tour in the United States from June 14, 1959‚ to April 23, 1960‚ and Smith went along with it.

Smith was one of several cast members from the Broadway production that were chosen to appear in the movie version of West Side Story. He was contracted to play Ice, a role newly created for the movie. In the film, Smith was the singer and central performer of the pivotal song "Cool‚" originally sung by the character of Riff in the Broadway musical. Besides performing "Cool‚" Smith dubbed some of Russ Tamblyn's singing in "Jet Song."

After the film, Smith continued his association with West Side Story. He played Riff in both the 1962 Los Angeles and 1963 Sacramento productions of the musical, the latter with Sylvia Lewis in the role of Anita. He reprised the role again in 1964, when West Side Story went on tour in Tokyo, Japan. Right before West Side Story's tour in Japan, Smith had performed at the 1964 New York World's Fair at the DuPont Pavilion in the musical The Wonderful World of Chemistry. That same year, Smith was in the cast for the Broadway musical Anyone Can Whistle. After a pre-Broadway run in Philadelphia, the show closed after a week and only nine performances.

Despite his notable screen debut on West Side Story, Smith appeared in films and television usually in small roles and walk-on parts; sometimes as a dancer (To Be or Not to Be, How to Succeed in Business Without Really Trying, Hello, Dolly!, Hearts of the West, At Long Last Love, The Producers), and often uncredited (Police Squad!). Some of his more notable television appearances include the series Surfside Six and 87th Precinct.

Smith performed at other venues, including Las Vegas shows, nightclubs, cabarets, and stage productions both in the U.S. and abroad. His stage work includes Parade with Carole Cook and Michele Lee, Vintage '60, also with Michele Lee and Sylvia Lewis, the San Francisco production of Half a Sixpence with Anne Rogers and Roger C. Carmel, and the 1973 musical version of Gone With the Wind, choreographed by Joe Layton. Smith had toured with Carol Channing in her 1970 revue Carol Channing with Her 10 Stout-Hearted Men‚ which was choreographed by Joe Layton. Finally, Smith toured internationally with his own nightclub act.

David Ehrenstein, author of the book Open Secret: Gay Hollywood, 1928–2000, said that Smith was openly gay, and as a result, did not pursue a Hollywood career.

In the 1970s, Smith owned and operated a bar named Tucker's Turf in North Hollywood.

Tucker Smith died of cancer on December 22, 1988, at the age of 52 at the UCLA Medical Center in Los Angeles, California. His cancer has been attributed by various sources as to be throat, neck and/or jaw cancer, and was diagnosed in late 1986. Smith was survived by three sisters. Some newspapers erroneously printed that he was survived by three daughters. After his death, Smith was laid to rest in his hometown of Philadelphia.

In her autobiography It's Always Something, written shortly before her own death from cancer, comedian Gilda Radner expressed her excitement at having Tucker Smith in her cancer support group because she was a fan of his from his performance in West Side Story.

== Filmography ==
Year	Title	Role	Notes
1961	West Side Story	Ice (Jets)	
1967	How to Succeed in Business Without Really Trying	Passerby / Dancing Executive	Uncredited
1967	The Producers	Lead Dancer	Uncredited
1969	Hello, Dolly!	Dancer	Uncredited
1975	At Long Last Love	The Primitive Man Dancer	
1975	Hearts of the West	Noodle in Pith Helmet	
1983	To Be or Not to Be	Klotski's Klown	
