= Russian State Institute of Performing Arts =

Theatre school in St. Petersburg, Russia

Coordinates: 59.9406°N 30.3458°E

- Российский государственный институт сценических искусств
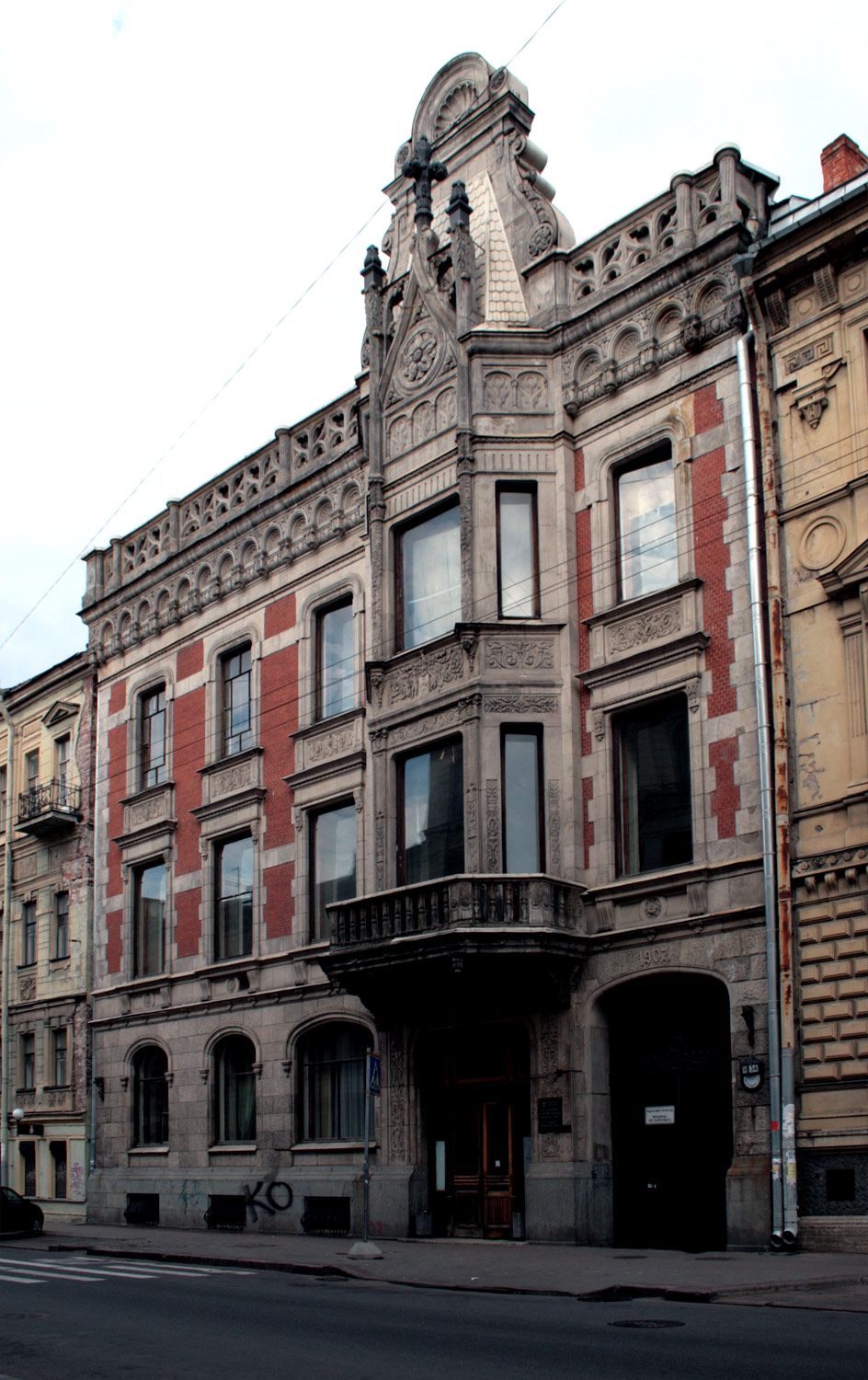
- Building at Mokhovaya Street
- Type: Performing arts
- Established: 1779
- Location: 34 Mokhovaya Street, Saint Petersburg, Russia
- Website: www.rgisi.ru/en/

The Russian State Institute of Performing Arts (Russian: Российский государственный институт сценических искусств), formerly known as St Petersburg Theatre Arts Academy, formerly Leningrad State Institute of Theatre, Music, and Cinema (LGITMiK), is a theatre school in Saint Petersburg. It is the oldest Russian state theatre school, being founded in 1779, and has incorporated several mergers of other institutions during its history, including the Ostrovsky Leningrad Theatre Institute and the Leningrad Institute of Art History.

It is located at 34 Mokhovaya Street.

== History ==
The college was originally founded in 1779 at the Emperor's Theatre in St Petersburg, and is the oldest theatre school in Russia. Over the course of its history, the institute has been reorganised and renamed several times.

A growing theatre school assimilated the St Petersburg State Theatre Arts Academy, along with several independent theatre classes and schools in the city. One of the most notable was the School of Acting (or Acting Skills School, or School of Theatrical Skills) which had been founded in 1918. Leonid Sergeevich Vivian was appointed professor at the school in 1940 and from 1957 was head of the acting department. He was later awarded the Order of Lenin and a number of other medals and awards.

After World War II, the institute (then named Leningrad Ostrovsky Institute of the Theatre or variant translation) was headed by Yuri Slonimsky (1902-1978), followed in 1951 by Vera Krasovskaya (who had studied there since 1946), then Galina Dobrovolskaya.

In 1958 the State Research Institute of Theatre, Music and Cinematography was created.

The School of Acting was absorbed in 1961, and in 1962 the Leningrad (State) Institute of Theatre, Music and Cinematography (LGITMiK) was created, after the merging of the Ostrovsky Leningrad Theatre Institute (named after A. N. Ostrovsky and also known as the A. N. Ostrovsky Leningrad State Theatre Institute) and the Leningrad Institute of Art History. The former research institute was deprived of its autonomy and became a department of the new institute, with the vlue of its music collection apparently overlooked.

In 1993 it was renamed to St Petersburg State Theatre Arts Academy. English translations of past names have varied, and include St Petersburg Theatre Arts Academy, St Petersburg State Theatre Arts Academy, St Petersburg Academy of Theatre Arts, St Petersburg Theatre College, and Leningrad Theatre Institute.

Its style of instruction has also changed: from the classical theatre in the "Emperor's Theatre School" to workshops under renowned stage director Vsevolod Meyerhold in the 1910s and 1920s, through to its current approach.

Well-known actor Georgiy Zhzhonov trained as an actor at the school (variously referred to as "Leningrad Theatrical School" and "Leningrad State Theatre College" in the sources) under director Sergei Gerasimov in the 1930s, graduating in 1935.

== Location ==
The institute occupies historic buildings built in the early 20th century. Its main building, a three-storey building at 34 Mokhovaya Street, is an example of modern architecture.

The building was constructed between 1902 and 1904 by Jules-Louis-Auguste Benois and Aleksandr Vladovsky, and became the home of N. V. Bezobrazova, wife of Russian general Vladimir Mikhailovich Bezobrazov. In 1922, after the Russian Revolution, the building was given to the Bryantsev Youth Theatre, and in 1962 to LGITMiK.

== Instruction ==
It is the largest professional theatre school in Europe, with faculty numbering more than 330, around 230 support staff, and over 1550 students. The institute teaches along similar lines as the Russian Academy of Theatre Arts in Moscow.

Along with instruction in traditional classical theatre, the school employs the Stanislavsky method in its teaching, along with Meyerhold's principles of "biomechanics", and elements of the teachings of Nikolai Demidov, Mikhail Butkevich, and Michael Chekhov.

It offers BA, MA, and doctorate level as well as non-degree courses, and provides instruction in directing, acting, set design, тесhnology, theatre studies, production, criticism and theatre management. It covers a range of performing arts: drama, musical theatre, puppetry, variety shows, and television.

The institute also hosts various international festivals, conferences and competitions, as well as student and teacher exchange programs.

== Former staff and alumni ==
- Alexander Meiselman (1900–1938), taught theatre history until being arrested in 1937
- Professor Anatoly Altschuller (1922–1996) was a theatre historian. He attended the Ostrovsky Theatre Institute after World War II and graduated in 1948, returning as a research fellow in 1954.
- Edward Rozinsky, theatre director, choreographer, playwright, and physical theatre specialist, taught mime and acting at the Leningrad Institute of Theatre, Music, and Cinematography before moving to the United States.
- Arkady Katsman, taught in the 1970s
- Lev Dolin
