= West Side Story (1961 film) =

1961 film directed by Robert Wise and Jerome Robbins

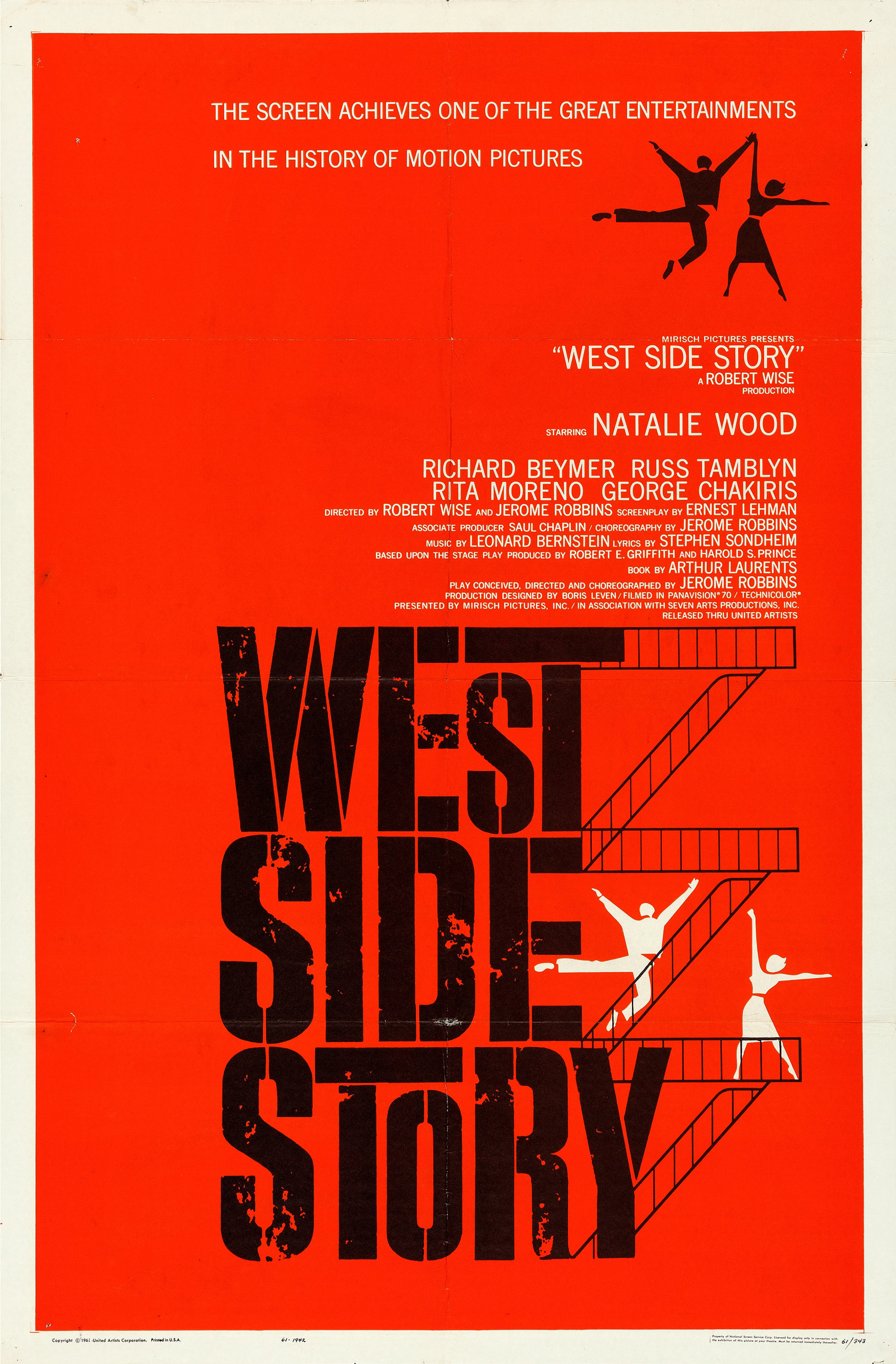
- Theatrical release poster by Joe Caroff
- Directed by: Robert Wise; Jerome Robbins
- Screenplay by: Ernest Lehman
- Based on: West Side Story 1957 musical by Jerome Robbins Leonard Bernstein Stephen Sondheim Arthur Laurents; Romeo and Juliet by William Shakespeare
- Produced by: Robert Wise
- Starring: Natalie Wood; Richard Beymer; Russ Tamblyn; Rita Moreno; George Chakiris
- Cinematography: Daniel L. Fapp
- Edited by: Thomas Stanford
- Music by: Leonard Bernstein
- Production companies: Mirisch Pictures; Seven Arts Productions
- Distributed by: United Artists
- Release date: October 18, 1961
- Running time: 152 minutes
- Country: United States
- Language: English
- Budget: $6.75 million
- Box office: $44.1 million

West Side Story is a 1961 American musical romantic drama film directed by Robert Wise and Jerome Robbins, written by Ernest Lehman, and produced by Wise. The film is an adaptation of the 1957 Broadway musical of the same title, which in turn was inspired by Shakespeare's play Romeo and Juliet. It stars Natalie Wood, Richard Beymer, Russ Tamblyn, Rita Moreno, and George Chakiris and was photographed by Daniel L. Fapp in Super Panavision 70. The music was composed by Leonard Bernstein, with lyrics by Stephen Sondheim.

Released on October 18, 1961, through United Artists, the film received praise from critics and viewers, and became the highest-grossing film of 1961. It was nominated for 11 Academy Awards and won 10, including Best Picture (in addition to a special award for Robbins), becoming the record holder for the most wins for a musical. West Side Story is regarded as one of the greatest musical films of all time. The film was designated as being "culturally, historically, or aesthetically significant" by the Library of Congress and was selected for preservation in the United States National Film Registry in 1997. A second film adaptation by Steven Spielberg was released in December 2021.

== Plot ==
In New York City in 1957, two teenage gangs compete for control on the Upper West Side. The Jets, a group of whites led by Riff, brawl with the Sharks, Puerto Ricans led by Bernardo. Lieutenant Schrank and Officer Krupke arrive and break it up. The Jets challenge the Sharks to a rumble to be held after an upcoming dance.

Riff wants his best friend Tony, a co-founder and former member of the Jets, to fight at the rumble. Riff invites Tony to the dance, but Tony says he senses something important is coming. Riff suggests it could happen at the dance. Tony finally agrees to go. Meanwhile, Bernardo's younger sister, Maria, tells her best friend and Bernardo's girlfriend, Anita, how excited she is about the dance. At the dance, the two gangs and their girls refuse to intermingle. Tony arrives; he and Maria fall in love instantly, but Bernardo angrily demands that Tony stay away from her and sends her home. Riff proposes a midnight meeting with Bernardo at Doc's drug store to settle the rules for the rumble.

Anita argues that Bernardo is overprotective of Maria, and they compare the advantages of Puerto Rico and the US mainland. Tony sneaks onto Maria's fire escape where they reaffirm their love. Krupke, who suspects the Jets are planning something, warns them not to cause trouble. The Sharks arrive, and the gangs agree to a showdown the following evening under the highway, with a one-on-one fistfight. When Schrank arrives, the gangs feign friendship. Schrank orders the Sharks out and fails to discover information about the fight.

The next day at the bridal shop where they work, Anita accidentally tells Maria about the rumble. Tony arrives to see Maria. Anita, shocked, warns them about the consequences if Bernardo learns of their relationship. Maria makes Tony promise to prevent the rumble. Tony and Maria fantasize about their wedding.

The gangs approach the area under the highway. Tony arrives to stop the fight, but Bernardo antagonizes him. Unwilling to watch Tony be humiliated, Riff initiates a knife fight. Tony intervenes, leading to Bernardo stabbing and killing Riff. Tony kills Bernardo with Riff's knife, and a melee ensues. Police sirens blare, and everyone flees, leaving behind the dead bodies. Maria waits for Tony on the roof of her apartment building; her fiancé Chino (an arranged engagement) arrives and tells her what happened. Tony arrives and asks for Maria's forgiveness. He plans to turn himself in to the police. Maria is devastated but confirms her love for Tony and asks him to stay.

The Jets and their new leader, Ice, reassemble outside a garage and focus on reacting to the police. Anybodys arrives and warns them that Chino is after Tony with a gun. Ice sends the Jets to warn Tony. A grieving Anita enters the apartment while Tony and Maria are in the bedroom. The lovers arrange to meet at Doc's, where they will pick up getaway money to elope. Anita spots Tony leaving through the window and chides Maria for the relationship with Bernardo's killer, but Maria convinces her to help them elope. Schrank arrives and questions Maria about the rumble. Maria sends Anita to tell Tony that Maria is detained from meeting him.

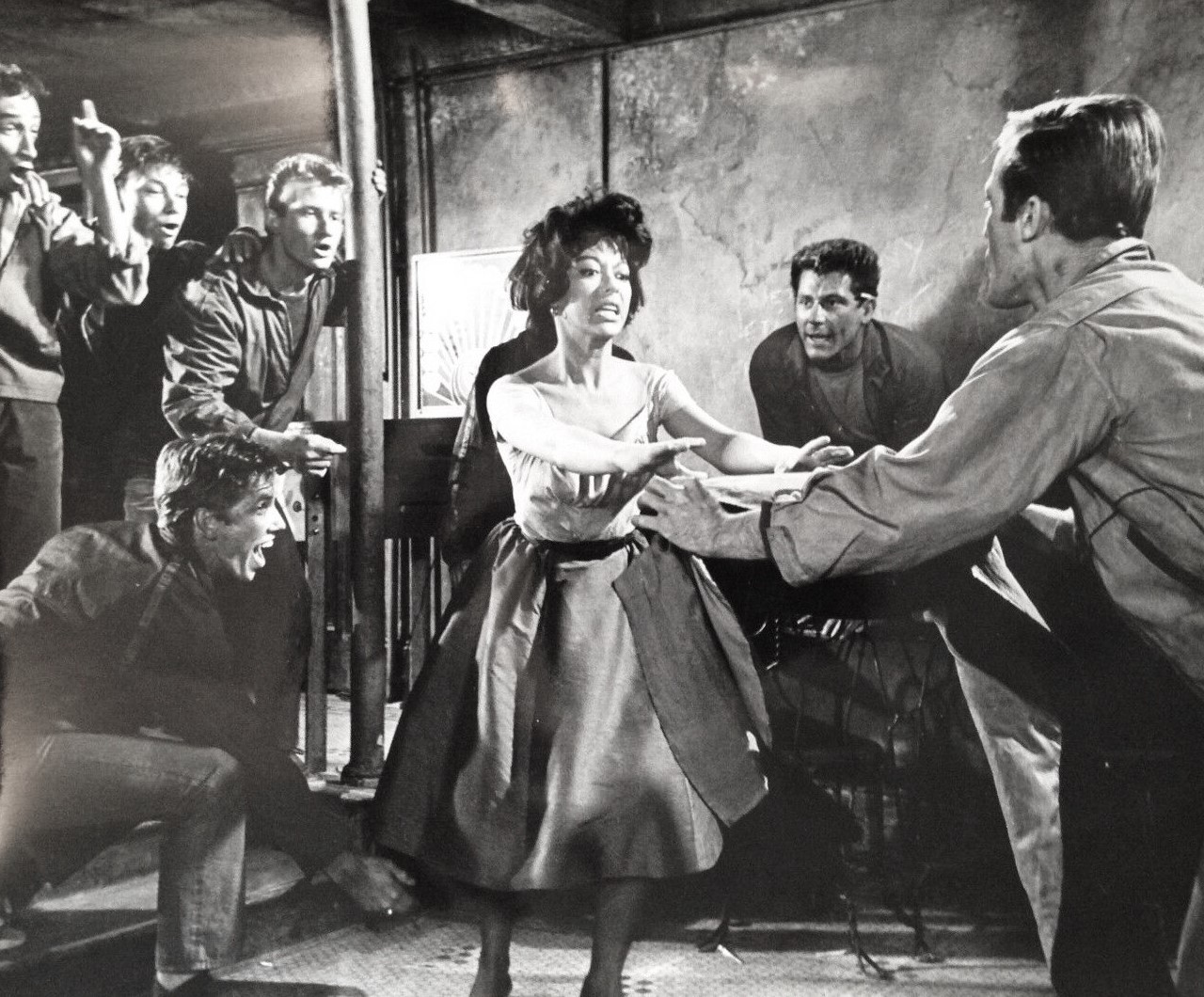
The Jets attacking Anita at Doc's drug store

When Anita reaches Doc's, the Jets harass and sexually assault her, stopping only when Doc appears and intervenes. Anita angrily lies, saying that Chino has killed Maria. Doc banishes the Jets, gives Tony his getaway money and delivers Anita's message. Tony, distraught, runs into the streets, shouting for Chino to kill him, too. In the playground next to Doc's, Tony spots Maria and they run toward each other, only for Chino to shoot Tony. The gangs arrive to find Maria holding Tony, who dies in her arms. Maria takes the gun from Chino and threatens to shoot everyone, blaming their hate for the deaths, but cannot do so. Schrank and Krupke arrive to arrest Chino, and the gangs end their feud by uniting to carry Tony's body away in a funeral procession with Maria following.

== Cast ==
- Natalie Wood as Maria, Bernardo's younger sister and Chino's arranged fiancée, who falls in love with Tony
  - Marni Nixon as Maria's singing voice (also Anita's singing voice in Quintet)
- Richard Beymer as Tony, co-founder and one-time member of the Jets and best friend of Riff, who works at Doc's drugstore and falls in love with Maria
  - Jimmy Bryant as Tony's singing voice
- Russ Tamblyn as Riff, leader of the Jets, best friend of Tony
  - Tucker Smith as Riff's singing voice for "Jet Song"
- Rita Moreno as Anita, Bernardo's girlfriend, and Maria's closest confidante
  - Betty Wand as Anita's singing voice for "A Boy Like That"
  - Marni Nixon as Anita’s singing voice for "Tonight Quintet"
- George Chakiris as Bernardo, leader of the Sharks, older brother of Maria and Anita's boyfriend
- Simon Oakland as Lieutenant Schrank, a hard-boiled plainclothes detective
- Ned Glass as Doc, Tony's boss; a decent, elderly Jewish drugstore owner
- William Bramley as Sergeant Krupke, a brusque beat cop (Bramley played the role in the original Broadway production)

Uncredited:

- John Astin as Glad Hand, well-meaning but ineffective social worker
- Penny Santon as Madam Lucia, bridal shop owner

=== Jets ===
- Tucker Smith as Ice (a character created for the film), Riff's lieutenant; becomes leader of the Jets after Riff's death
- Tony Mordente as Action, a short-tempered Jet.
- David Winters as A-Rab, Baby John's best friend
- Eliot Feld as Baby John, the youngest member of the Jets; a relative innocent
- Bert Michaels as Snowboy
- David Bean as Tiger
- Robert Banas as Joyboy
- Anthony 'Scooter' Teague as Big Deal
- Harvey Evans (Harvey Hohnecker) as Mouthpiece
- Tommy Abbott as Gee-Tar

=== Jet girls ===
- Susan Oakes as Anybodys, a tomboy and wannabe Jet
- Gina Trikonis as Graziella, Riff's girlfriend
- Carole D'Andrea as Velma, Ice's girlfriend

Uncredited:

- Rita Hyde d'Amico as Clarice, Big Deal's girlfriend
- Pat Tribble as Minnie, Baby John's girlfriend
- Francesca Bellini as Debby, Snowboy's girlfriend
- Elaine Joyce as Hotsie, Tiger's girlfriend

=== Sharks ===
- Jose De Vega as Chino Martin, Bernardo's best friend, who is the arranged fiancé of Maria
- Jay Norman as Pepe, Bernardo's lieutenant
- Gus Trikonis as Indio, Pepe's best friend
- Eddie Verso as Juano
- Jaime Rogers as Loco
- Larry Roquemore as Rocco
- Robert Thompson as Luis
- Nick Covacevich as Toro
- Rudy Del Campo as Del Campo
- Andre Tayir as Chile

=== Shark girls ===
- Yvonne Wilder as Consuelo, Pepe's girlfriend (In credits as Yvonne Othon)
- Suzie Kaye as Rosalia, Indio's girlfriend
- Joanne Miya as Francisca, Toro's girlfriend

Uncredited:

- Maria Jimenez Henley as Teresita, Juano's girlfriend
- Luci Stone as Estella, Loco's girlfriend
- Olivia Perez as Margarita, Rocco's girlfriend

== Musical numbers ==
Act I

1. "Overture" – Orchestra
2. "Prologue" – Orchestra
3. "Jet Song" – Riff and Jets
4. "Something's Coming" – Tony
5. "Dance at the Gym: (Blues, Promenade, Mambo, Cha-cha, and Jump)" – Orchestra
6. "Maria" – Tony
7. "America" – Anita, Bernardo, Sharks and Girls
8. "Tonight" – Tony and Maria
9. "Gee, Officer Krupke" – Riff and Jets
10. "Maria (violin)" – Orchestra

Act II

1. "I Feel Pretty" – Maria, Consuelo, Rosalia, and Francisca
2. "One Hand, One Heart" – Tony and Maria
3. "Tonight Quintet" – Maria, Tony, Anita, Riff, Bernardo, Jets, and Sharks
4. "The Rumble" – Orchestra
5. "Somewhere" – Tony and Maria
6. "Cool" – Ice and Jets
7. "A Boy Like That/I Have a Love" – Anita and Maria
8. "Somewhere" (reprise) – Maria
9. "Finale" – Orchestra

== Production ==
Executive producer Walter Mirisch enlisted the services of Jerome Robbins, who had directed and choreographed the stage version of West Side Story. Because Robbins had no previous film experience, Mirisch hired Robert Wise to co-direct and produce because of his "experience in gritty subject matter" and his ability to complete motion pictures under budget and ahead of schedule. Robbins was to direct the musical sequences, and Wise would handle the story's dramatic elements. Robbins directed his portion of the film first, spending a great deal of time on retakes and on-set rehearsals as well as discussing setups with Wise. Assistant director Robert Relyea recalled an unusual number of injuries endured by the dancers. After 45 days of shooting, the picture was 24 days behind schedule. With the film over budget, Wise dismissed Robbins. The remaining dance numbers were directed with the help of Robbins's assistants. Recognizing Robbins's considerable creative contribution to the film, Wise agreed that Robbins should be given co-directing credit. Robbins and Wise also kept in contact and discussed the production, with Wise's taking many of Robbins's suggestions about the editing of the film. The titles and end credits sequences were designed by Saul Bass with Elaine Makatura Bass. Bass was credited as visual consultant for creating the opening sequence over the film's overture.

On location shooting for the "Prologue" and "Jet Song" occurred at two different Manhattan, New York locations. A playground located at East 110th Street, now Tito Puente Way, between 2nd and 3rd Avenues, served as the backdrop for introducing the two gangs. West 68th Street between West End and Amsterdam Avenues, three blocks north of the San Juan Hill community, provided additional realism for where the gangs roamed. The sound stages at the Samuel Goldwyn Studio, located in West Hollywood, California, were used for rehearsals and studio shooting.

=== Casting ===
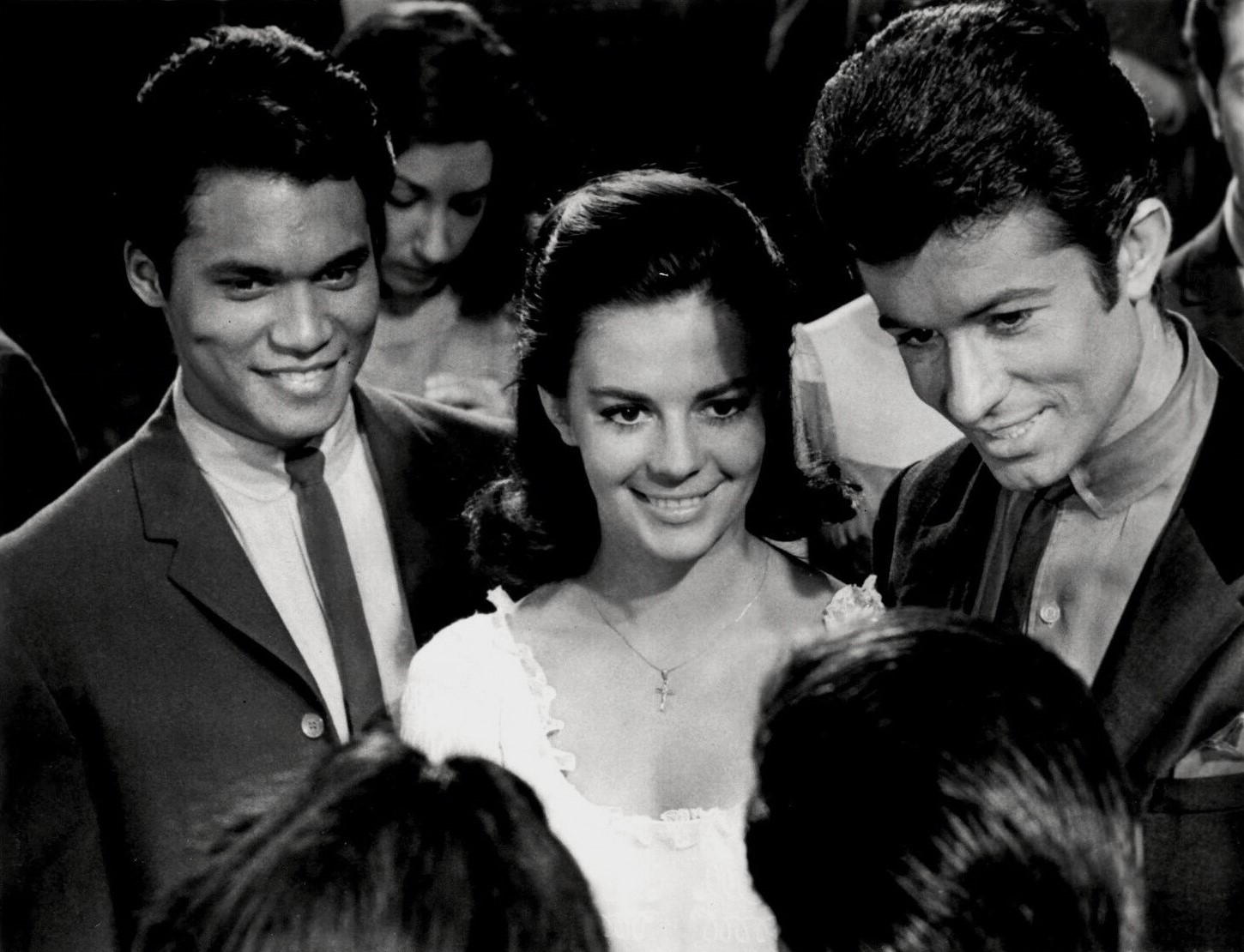
Jose De Vega as Chino, Natalie Wood as Maria, and George Chakiris as Bernardo

Although Robbins pushed for 29-year-old Carol Lawrence, the first Maria, to be cast in the same role in the film, after seeing her screen test the producers agreed she was too old to play the part. A number of other cast members from the Broadway and West End productions were cast in the film. Tony Mordente, who played A-Rab on stage, was cast as Action in the film, and George Chakiris, Riff in the London stage production, played Bernardo in the film. Tucker Smith, who joined the Broadway production several months into its run, played Diesel, renamed Ice for the film. David Winters, the first Baby John on stage, played A-Rab. Eliot Feld, an ensemble member and understudy for Baby John on Broadway, played Baby John. Jay Norman, Juano on stage, appeared as Pepe. Reprising their stage roles in the film were Carole D'Andrea as Velma, Tommy Abbott as Gee-Tar, and William Bramley as Officer Krupke.

Elvis Presley was approached for Tony, but his manager Colonel Tom Parker turned down the part. Others who were considered for the part included Russ Tamblyn, Warren Beatty, Burt Reynolds, Anthony Perkins, Bobby Darin, Troy Donahue, Marlon Brando, Richard Chamberlain, and Robert Redford. Reynolds was considered "too tough" for the part. Chamberlain was believed to be "too mature" for the role. Tamblyn impressed Wise and was given the supporting role of Riff. Ultimately, Richard Beymer won the part of Tony despite having no history of singing or dancing.

Natalie Wood was filming Splendor in the Grass with Warren Beatty and was involved with him romantically off-screen. The producers were not considering her for the role of Maria at that time. When considering Beatty for the role of Tony, Wise requested a reel of his work. However, after seeing a clip from Splendor in the Grass, the producers decided his co-star Wood was perfect for Maria, but Beatty was not suitable for the role of Tony. Jill St. John, Audrey Hepburn, Diane Baker, Elizabeth Ashley, Suzanne Pleshette and Angela Dorian were among the many actresses who were considered for the role of Maria in the film.

=== Editing ===
Thomas Stanford won the Academy Award for Best Film Editing for his work on West Side Story. The film was listed as the 38th best-edited film of all time in a 2012 survey of members of the Motion Picture Editors Guild. The dance sequences in particular have been noted by critics. In Louis Giannetti's textbook Understanding Movies, he writes: "Musicals are often edited in a radically formalist style, without having to observe the cutting conventions of ordinary dramatic movies. The editing of West Side Story is very abstract. The music...and the dance numbers...are edited together for maximum aesthetic impact, rather than to forward the story. Nor are the shots linked by some principle of thematic association. Rather, the shots are juxtaposed primarily for their lyrical and kinetic beauty, somewhat like a music video". In his retrospective review, Roger Ebert singled out the dances as extraordinary. Robbins participated in the editing of the musical numbers along with Stanford, Wise, and Walter Mirisch. His notes to Stanford stress that the editing should reveal the characters' emotions even if that compromised the dancing. The quote from Giannetti above indicates that the notes didn't strongly affect the final cuts of the dance numbers.

== Reception ==
=== Critical response ===
West Side Story is regarded as one of the greatest musical films ever made. It holds a 92% rating on Rotten Tomatoes based on 116 reviews, with an average rating of 8.4/10. The site's critical consensus states: "Buoyed by Robert Wise's dazzling direction, Leonard Bernstein's score, and Stephen Sondheim's lyrics, West Side Story remains perhaps the most iconic of all the Shakespeare adaptations to visit the big screen". Metacritic, which uses a weighted average, assigned the film a score of 86 out of 100, based on 17 critics, indicating "universal acclaim".

Original teaser trailer for West Side Story

Bosley Crowther of The New York Times wrote that "moving [the story] from stage to screen is to reconstruct its fine material into nothing short of a cinema masterpiece". Whitney Williams of Variety was also effusive, writing: "Technically, it is superb; use of color is dazzling, camera work often is thrilling, editing fast with dramatic punch, production design catches mood as well as action itself". Arthur Knight from the Saturday Review called it a "triumphant work of art." A review in The Hollywood Reporter called it "a magnificent show, a milestone in movie musicals, a box-office smash. It is so good that superlatives are superfluous. Let it be noted that the film musical, the one dramatic form that is purely American and purely Hollywood, has never been done better". By contrast, Pauline Kael derided the film as "frenzied hokum", decrying that the dialogue was "painfully old-fashioned and mawkish" and the dancing was a "simpering, sickly romantic ballet". In 1962, Mae Tinee of the Chicago Tribune gave a mixed review. She praised the cast, cinematography, dancing and script but wrote: "[T]his is a case when the big screen sometimes is a handicap. When the giant-sized, tear-stained faces of a desolated boy and girl fill the entire front of a theater, it seems incongruous for these young lovers to break into song. Some of the music is fresh and bright, some of it tiresomely repetitious, but all the members of the cast dance like demons. ... It's a cleverly stylized and dramatized depiction of a bloody story which probably will appeal most to those who like lengthy musicals, and to the younger generation who are fascinated by 'rumbles'. Their elders may find it depressing."

Writing in 2004, Roger Ebert included the film in his list of "Great Movies": "So the dancing is remarkable, and several of the songs have proven themselves by becoming standards, and there are moments of startling power and truth. West Side Story remains a landmark of musical history. But if the drama had been as edgy as the choreography, if the lead performances had matched Moreno's fierce concentration, if the gangs had been more dangerous and less like bad-boy Archies and Jugheads, if the ending had delivered on the pathos and tragedy of the original, there's no telling what might have resulted".

=== Box office ===
West Side Story was a commercial success upon its release. It became the highest-grossing film of 1961, earning rentals of $19,645,000 in the United States and Canada. It remained the highest-grossing musical film of all time until the release of The Sound of Music in 1965. The film grossed $44.1 million worldwide ($475 million in 2025). Because of profit participation, United Artists earned a profit of only $2.5 million on the film ($27 million in 2025).

== Accolades ==
West Side Story won 10 Academy Awards, making it the musical film with the most Oscar wins (including Best Picture). It was the first film to share the Academy Award for Best Director between two people, with Wise winning in the Best Picture and Best Director categories.

Award	Category	Nominee(s)	Result	Ref.
Academy Awards	Best Motion Picture	Robert Wise	Won	
Academy Awards	Best Director	Robert Wise and Jerome Robbins	Won	
Academy Awards	Best Supporting Actor	George Chakiris	Won	
Academy Awards	Best Supporting Actress	Rita Moreno	Won	
Academy Awards	Best Screenplay – Based on Material from Another Medium	Ernest Lehman	Nominated	
Academy Awards	Best Art Direction – Color	Art Direction: Boris Leven; Set Decoration: Victor A. Gangelin	Won	
Academy Awards	Best Cinematography – Color	Daniel L. Fapp	Won	
Academy Awards	Best Costume Design – Color	Irene Sharaff	Won	
Academy Awards	Best Film Editing	Thomas Stanford	Won	
Academy Awards	Best Scoring of a Musical Picture	Saul Chaplin, Johnny Green, Irwin Kostal, and Sid Ramin	Won	
Academy Awards	Best Sound	Fred Hynes and Gordon E. Sawyer	Won	
Academy Awards	Academy Honorary Award	Jerome Robbins	Won	
British Academy Film Awards	Best Film		Nominated	
Directors Guild of America Awards	Outstanding Directorial Achievement in Motion Pictures	Robert Wise and Jerome Robbins	Won	
Golden Globe Awards	Best Motion Picture – Musical		Won	
Golden Globe Awards	Best Actor in a Motion Picture – Musical or Comedy	Richard Beymer	Nominated	
Golden Globe Awards	Best Supporting Actor – Motion Picture	George Chakiris	Won	
Golden Globe Awards	Best Supporting Actress – Motion Picture	Rita Moreno	Won	
Golden Globe Awards	Best Director – Motion Picture	Robert Wise and Jerome Robbins	Nominated	
Golden Globe Awards	Most Promising Newcomer – Male	Richard Beymer	Nominated	
Golden Globe Awards	Most Promising Newcomer – Male	George Chakiris	Nominated	
Grammy Awards	Best Sound Track Album or Recording of Original Cast From a Motion Picture or Television	West Side Story; Saul Chaplin, Johnny Green, Irwin Kostal, and Sid Ramin	Won	
National Film Preservation Board	National Film Registry		Inducted	
New York Film Critics Circle Awards	Best Film		Won	
New York Film Critics Circle Awards	Best Director	Robert Wise and Jerome Robbins	Nominated	
Producers Guild of America Awards	PGA Hall of Fame – Motion Pictures		Won	
Sant Jordi Awards	Best Foreign Film	Robert Wise and Jerome Robbins	Won	
Satellite Awards	Best Classic DVD		Won	
Writers Guild of America Awards	Best Written American Musical	Ernest Lehman	Won	

American Film Institute lists:

- AFI's 100 Years...100 Movies – #41
- AFI's 100 Years...100 Passions – #3
- AFI's 100 Years...100 Songs:
  - "Somewhere" – #20
  - "America" – #35
  - "Tonight" – #59
- AFI's Greatest Movie Musicals – #2
- AFI's 100 Years...100 Movies (10th Anniversary Edition) – #51

The film's cast appeared and was honored at the 50th anniversary of West Side Story at the 2011 Ventura Film Festival.

== Score and soundtrack ==
Leonard Bernstein was displeased with the orchestration for the movie, which was the work of Sid Ramin and Irwin Kostal, who had orchestrated the original Broadway production. That show had been orchestrated for roughly 30 musicians; for the movie, United Artists allowed them triple that, including six saxophone parts, eight trumpets, five pianos and five xylophones. Bernstein found it "overbearing and lacking in texture and subtlety".

Stephen Sondheim, who did not like the sequence of the songs in the Broadway version, had the song "Gee, Officer Krupke" being sung before the rumble in place of the song "Cool" which is sung instead after the rumble; the song "I Feel Pretty" is also sung before the rumble instead of after. In addition, the song "America" was sung in-between the two love songs "Maria" and "Tonight", instead of having the two love songs being sung consecutively. Though mentioned in earlier scripts, the "Somewhere" dream ballet was not well defined for the film and was put on the back burner for Robbins to conceive and execute toward the end of shooting. With Robbins relieved of his duties midway in the production, the dance sequence was eliminated. "Somewhere" was left to be sung by Tony and Maria in her bedroom. Reprises of the lyrics were omitted as well, especially in the songs "One Hand, One Heart" and "A Boy Like That". Some lyrics were changed in order to avoid censorship, especially in the songs "Jet Song", "Gee, Officer Krupke", "America" and the "Tonight Quintet". Even the phrase "womb to tomb, sperm to worm" between Riff and Tony had to be replaced with "womb to tomb, birth to earth" between Riff and Tony near the beginning of the film and "one-two-three, one-two-three" between Riff and Diesel in the Quintet.

As provided in her contract, Wood prerecorded her songs and allowed the production team to decide whether to use her voice. She found the songs challenging, but was allowed to film her scenes lip-synching to her own vocals and was led to believe that these versions would be used, although music supervisors Saul Chaplin and Johnny Green had already decided to use Marni Nixon's voice. Wood's singing voice is only heard during the reprise of the song "Somewhere" when Tony dies. Though Nixon had recorded the songs in the same orchestra sessions as Wood, she had to re-record them to synch with Wood's filmed performances. Even the one song for which Wood had lip-synched to Nixon's voice, "One Hand, One Heart", had to be recorded again because Wood's lip-synching was unsatisfactory. When Marni Nixon learned that she had not signed a contract for participating in the recording and demanded a percentage of the LP record, she was told that all percentages had been allocated. Bernstein gave her 0.25% of his album royalties. This set a precedent for all future "ghost singers".

Beymer's vocals were performed by Jimmy Bryant. Tucker Smith, who played Ice, dubbed the singing voice of Riff in "Jet Song", instead of Russ Tamblyn. Tamblyn's own voice was used in "Gee, Officer Krupke" and the "Quintet". Rita Moreno was dubbed by Betty Wand in the song "A Boy Like That" because the song needed to be performed at a register that was too low for her. However, Moreno sang her own vocals in "America". Marni Nixon sang some of Moreno's parts in the "Quintet" when illness prevented Moreno from doing so. Wand was also ill on the day of final recording, and so Nixon recorded Anita's vocal line as well.

For the 50th anniversary of the film's 1961 release, a score closer to the Broadway version was created by Garth Edwin Sunderland of the Leonard Bernstein Office to be performed live at screenings of the movie with the score removed, but with the original vocals maintained. The score's New York City premiere was presented at Lincoln Center's David Geffen Hall, called Avery Fisher Hall at the time, built atop the original film locations, which were razed in a late 1950s urban renewal project.

== Legacy ==
A scene in the 1965 French movie "Gendarme in New York" pastiches West Side Story.

In 2009, photographer Mark Seliger re-created scenes from the film for magazine Vanity Fair called West Side Story Revisited, using Camilla Belle as Maria, Ben Barnes as Tony, Jennifer Lopez as Anita, Rodrigo Santoro as Bernardo and Chris Evans as Riff. Portraying the Sharks are Minka Kelly, Jay Hernandez, Natalie Martinez, Brandon T. Jackson and Melonie Diaz. Portraying the Jets are Ashley Tisdale, Sean Faris, Robert Pattinson, Cam Gigandet, Trilby Glover, Brittany Snow and Drake Bell.

West Side Story influenced Michael Jackson's "Beat It" and "Bad" music videos. The first features Jackson as a peacemaker between two rival gangs in an homage to his favorite film. In 2016, the Directors Guild of America ranked the film 49th on its list of The 80 Best-Directed Films since the Guild’s founding in 1936.

== 2021 film ==
A second film adaptation of the musical was released by 20th Century Studios on December 10, 2021, directed by Steven Spielberg and choreographed by Justin Peck, with a screenplay by Tony Kushner. It stars Ansel Elgort as Tony, Rachel Zegler as Maria and Ariana DeBose as Anita; Moreno returns as a new character, Valentina, who is Doc's widow. It received seven nominations at the 94th Academy Awards, including Best Picture, winning one Oscar for DeBose's performance.

== See also ==
- List of American films of 1961
