= Edward Verso =

American dancer and choreographer

- Born: October 25, 1941 (age 85); New York City, New York, U.S.
- Occupations: Dancer, choreographer
- Movement: Ballet/Modern dance
- Spouse(s): Janet Mitchell (1963-); Karen Stasick (1990-)

Edward Verso (born October 25, 1941), sometimes credited as Eddie Verso, is an American dancer and choreographer known for his work in both stage and film productions, particularly in ballet. A former principal dancer for the American Ballet Theatre, and a renowned member of Jerome Robbins troupe, "Ballets USA". he is also known for his association with West Side Story, in which he performed on stage in the London production, as well as in the 1961 film adaptation.

== Early life ==
Edward Verso was born in Brooklyn, New York City, on 25 October 1941 to Philip and Rachel Verso (née Swiss). His father, Philip (or Filippo) worked in the manufacture of clothes and footwear and had emigrated from Sicily with his parents and siblings in 1924, having been born in Riesi. Similarly, his mother Rachel was born in Manchester, England and had emigrated with her family from England, and arrived in New York 1930. His maternal grandparents were both Jewish and although they had married in London, were both from Warsaw, which at the time of their both was within the Russian Empire. The family name of Swiss being an anglicised form of Schweis.

Verso had an older brother, Phil (1939–2000) who went on to join the US Navy and also became Fire fighter both in New York and later Florida.

Verso first performed at the age of eight, tap dancing for USO shows at area military bases. He began taking dance classes at the age of ten with Vincenzo Celli. As a teenager, he played the Prince in a production of the Nutcracker with the New York City Ballet. He later attended the High School of the Performing Arts.

== Career ==
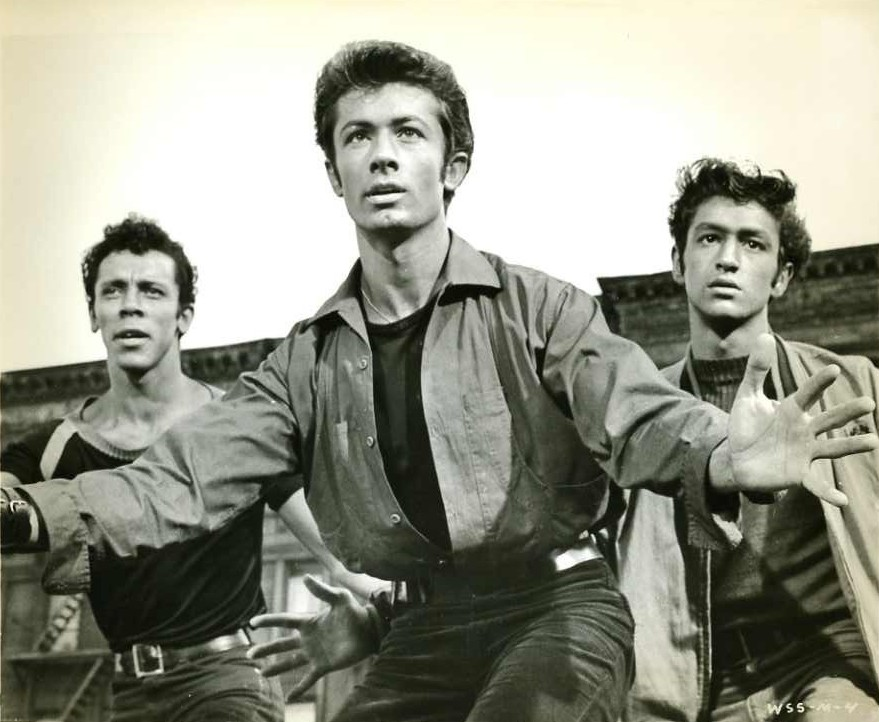
Jay Norman as Pepe (on the left) in the 1961 film adaptation of West Side Story with George Chakiris as Bernardo (centre) and Eddie Verso (Juano), right

Having graduated from the High School of the Performing Arts in New York, Verso was cast as Baby John in the 1958 London production of West Side Story after the hit Broadway musical went on tour. He was then cast as Juano in the movie version, again alongside George Chakiris and Jay Norman.

Following the film, Verso continued to dance for Robbins in his Ballets U.S.A. company and through his dancing career would often perform in Robbins' Moves, Interplay and N.Y. Export: Opus Jazz. Additionally, he was associated with the Pearl Land Modern Dance Company and spent time in a jazz dance group in Japan before joining the American Ballet Theatre ("ABT").

From 1962 to 1968 he was principal dancer for ABT. Among his many performances, he was the male lead in Eliot Feld's "Harbinger", Frederick Ashton's "Les Patineurs", Agnes De Mille's "Rodeo", Jerome Robbins' "Fancy Free", Michael Smuin's "Catherine Wheel" and Antony Tudor's "Undertow".

In June 1967, he and his wife Janet Mitchell, a former Metropolitan Opera Company dancer who had joined ABT in 1960, performed at the White House in front of President Lyndon B Johnson and the First Lady. Verso's performance at the event was that of the Champion Roper from "Rodeo". Additionally, his time at the ABT allowed Verso to study at the Bolshoi in Moscow as well as the Kirov School in Leningrad and the Royal Ballet in London.

In 1968 he staged "Interplay" for the Robert Joffrey Ballet Company having ben designated by Jerome Robbin as qualified to stage the ballet and to dance either of the two main male roles. He and Mitchell's pas de deux in Interplay was praised by critics such as Clive Barnes of the Saturday Review. The Russian ballet critic, Vera Krasovskaya of Leningrad, also praised Verso for his acting and dancing in his earlier roles in "Fancy Free" and "Rodeo".

In 1968, he and Mitchell purchased The Academy of Ballet in Oakland and became the new co-directors of the school, moving to Mitchell's native New Jersey. Verso would also act as artistic director for Festival Dance Theatre in New Jersey. However, Verso continued to perform alongside his teaching commitments. In 1969 he left ABT to become principal dancer for the City Center Joffrey Ballet. Whilst on a tour of the Soviet Union with the Joffrey Ballet, he roomed with Kevin McKenzie and took the younger dancer under his wing. He later recommended McKenzie to the ABT, where McKenzie would become a principal dancer and later artistic director.

Verso later became principal dancer for the New Jersey Ballet in the mid-1970s. His performances included the Snow King in George Tomal's 1976 version of the Nutcracker. His future wife, Karen Stasick also performed in that production.

Following a 1984 collaboration between NJ Ballet and the New Jersey State Opera, Verso and Stasick became a couple and they subsequently worked together at the Twyla Tharp Dance Studio. They both went on to work at Dayton Ballet where, from 1987 to 1990, Verso was ballet master during which time he choreographed, Frontiers, Buskers and The Banks of the Ohio as well as staging Billy The Kid for the company. When Stuart Sebastian left as artistic director of Dayton, Verso was unsuccessful in his application for the role and chose to take up a role at the University of Oklahoma as professor of dance.

In 1998, Verso had returned to New Jersey to teach and run the Dance Conservatory in Bedminster in the Somerset Hills, with his wife, Karen.

== Personal life ==
Verso met his future wife, Janet Mitchell during his time at the American Ballet Theatre. Like Verso, she was with the ABT until 1968 but in that time also made appearances on the Bell Telephone Hour television show with the Robert Joffrey Ballet Company. Mitchell and Verso married in 1963. They had their first child, Cristina, in 1969 and two years later, their son Edward was born in 1971. During this period, in his spare time, Verso liked to show his Siberian Husky, Chukchi.

In February 1990, he married Karen Stasick. They had been together since 1984 following a collaboration of "Giaconda" between NJ Ballet and the New Jersey State Opera. In 1996, their daughter, Elissa, was born.

== Productions ==
=== Theatre ===
- West Side Story, 1958, London cast as Baby John
- I Can Get It For You Wholesale, 1962 Broadway production, cast as Eddie, at the Shubert Theatre

=== Dance focussed productions ===
- "Ballets USA", 1958, Verso was part of the ensemble as a dancer. The show featured a collection of ballet pieces choreographed by Jerome Robbins including:
  - Moves
  - Interplay
  - N.Y. Export: Opus Jazz
- "American Ballet Theatre"
- "New Jersey Ballet"

=== Film ===
- West Side Story (1961 film) - Juano, member of the Sharks
