= Vera Krasovskaya =

Russian ballet historian, critic and dancer (1915–1999)

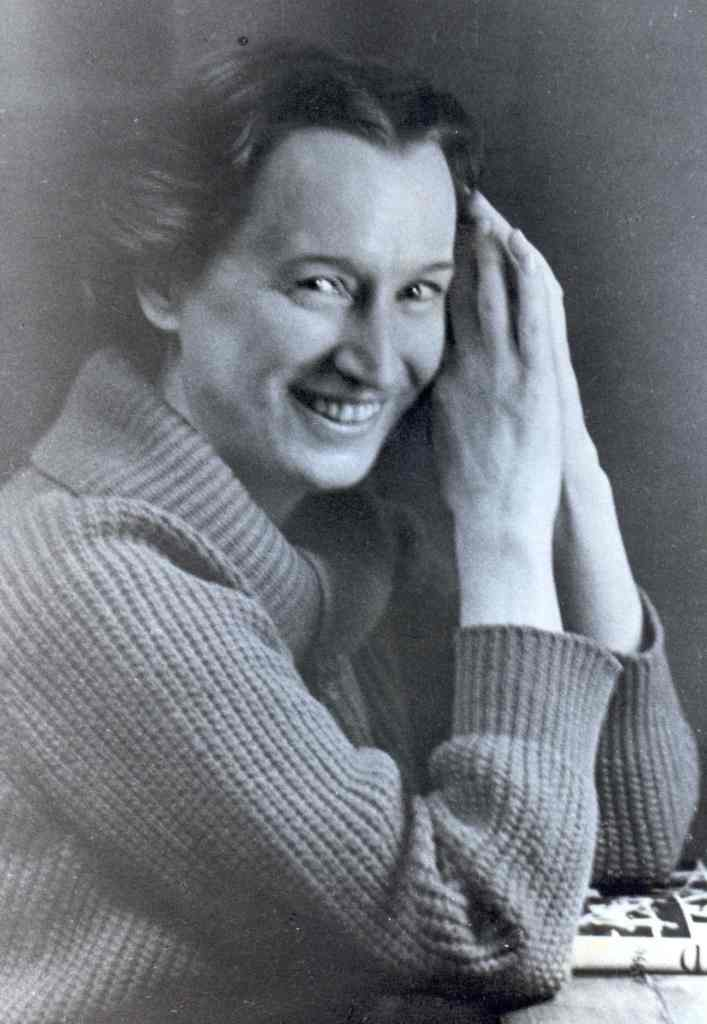
- Born: Vera Mikhailovna Krasovskaya; 11 September 1915; Petrograd, Russia
- Died: 15 August 1999 (aged 83); Saint Petersburg, Russia
- Education: Leningrad Ballet School
- Alma mater: Leningrad Ostrovsky Institute of Theatre
- Occupations: Ballet historian; Ballet critic; Dancer
- Years active: 1924–1999
- Spouse: David Zolotnitskiy (m. 1949–1999)
- Children: 2

Vera Mikhailovna Krasovskaya (Russian: Вера Михайловна Красовская; 11 September 1915 – 15 August 1999) was a Russian ballet historian, critic and dancer. She began her dancing career at the Leningrad Ballet School and graduated from it in 1933. Krasovskaya performed with the Kirov Ballet at the Mariinsky Theatre from 1933 to 1941 before stepping down to become a critic and studied at the Leningrad Ostrovsky Institute of Theatre. She published two volumes of four books on Russian ballet and went on to author a larger second volume focus on the history of ballet in Western Europe. Krasovskaya also wrote biographies on Anna Pavlova, Vaslav Nijinsky, Natalia Dudinskaya, Irina Kolpakova, Nikita Dolgushin and Agrippina Vaganova. She was awarded the Triumph Prize in December 1998 for her contribution to Russian culture.

== Early life ==
Krasovskaya's birth was on 11 September 1915 (old style 29 August 1915) in Petrograd (now Saint Petersburg), Russia. She was the daughter of the Petrograd architect Mikhail Krasovskaya and Maria Krasovskiy (née Zinovieva), and had one brother. Krasovskaya's grandfather was a pre-revolution senator and her mother was fluent in multiple languages. In 1924, she began her career studying as a dancer at the Leningrad Ballet School under Agrippina Vaganova, the ballet pedagogue. Krasovskaya graduated from the school in 1933.

== Career ==
Krasovskaya began performing with the Kirov Ballet at the Mariinsky Theatre in 1933. She continued to dance for the following eight years because she desired to learn about art history and was not active enough to improve her dancing ability.

In 1946, Krasovskaya began studying at the Leningrad Ostrovsky Institute of Theatre. She joined the theatre as a faculty member working as a senior scientific worker five years later, taking over from Yuri Slonimsky.

In the 1950s, Krasovskaya was a prominent figure in urging new approaches to dancing in drama, publishing in pamphlets and the press as well as on meaning and content in ballet, which resulted in some relaxation of certain attitudes considered limited. In 1955, Krasovskaya earned an arts criticism doctorate.

She travelled to the United States in 1989 to present at the Balatine Conference in Miami and at New York University.

== Publications ==
Krasovskaya published her first piece of criticism on dance called about Alla Shelest in the magazine Iskusstvo i Zhisn (English: Art and Life) 1941.

In 1956, she published her first study on the Georgian choreographer and dancer Vakhtang Chabukiani. Krasovskaya went on to publish the first of two volumes of four books on Russian ballet assessing Petipa's, Michel Fokine's as well as other Russian choreographers principles and work between 1958 from 1972. The first of which was called Russkii baletnyi teatr ot vozniknoveniya do ceredinii XIX veka (English: Ballet Theater from Its Origins to the Middle of the Nineteenth Century) in 1958. Krasovskaya's second book was published in 1963 as Russkii baletnyi teatr vtoroi polovinii XIX veka (English: Russian Ballet Theatre of the Second Half of the Nineteenth Century) and her third and fourth books were published in two volumes in both 1971 and 1973 as Russkii baletnyi teatr nachala dvadtsatogo veka (English: Russian Ballet Theater From the Beginning of the Twentieth Century).

After completing her first volume, she went on begin authoring a larger second volume focusing on the history of ballet in Western Europe. The first of Krasovskaya's three volumes were published as Zapadnoevropeiskii baletnyi teatr: Ocherki istorii (English: West European Ballet Theater); Volume I: Ot istokov do seredini XVIII veka (English: From the Beginning to the Middle of the Eighteenth Century); Volume II: Epokha Noverra (English: The Epoch of Noverre); Volume III: Preromantizm (English: The Preromantic Ballet) between 1979 and 1983, and the fourth Western European Ballet Theater in 1996. She also authored biographies of Anna Pavlova, Vaslav Nijinsky, Natalia Dudinskaya, Irina Kolpakova, Nikita Dolgushin and Agrippina Vaganova. Krasovsaka's final book, Profiles Of The Dance, was published in March 1998. Several of her books were translated into Czech, English, German and Polish.

She also contributed to various booklets, encyclopedias, foreign media, the Russian press, introductions to books on the art of ballet and reference books on ballet.

== Recognition and other roles ==
Krasovskaya's works led to her privately receiving the arts and literature Triumph Prize in December 1998 for her contribution to Russian culture. This was the first occasion in which a recipient was honoured for their work on dance since it was first presented in 1992.

She was a member of the Union of Soviet Writers; the Council on Choreography; the Council on the Coordination of Scientific Research Work; the U.S.S.R. Ministry of Culture and the Arts Council of Leningrad.

== Personal life ==
She married the writer David Zolotnitskiy in October 1949. Krasovskaya had a son who went on to become a professor at St Petersburg Theatre Academy and was stepmother to one daughter. On 15 August 1999, she died at her home in Saint Petersburg following a long and serious illness. Four days later, Krasovskaya was buried at the Memorial Komarovo cemetery in Komarovo.

== Legacy ==
Krasovskaya was outspoken on the current development in ballet. The St Petersburg correspondent for the Dancing Times and friend of hers Igor Stupnikov called her "a woman of sharp mind and great sense of humour who was a staunch advocate of everything new and progressive. She helped greatly the young choreographers, such as Yuri Grigorovich and Igor Belsky, passionately defending their first ballets on the Kirov stage."
