= Jay Norman =

American dancer and actor (1937–2021)

- Born: Joshua Alden Norman; March 20, 1937; Manhattan, New York, U.S.
- Died: November 14, 2021 (aged 84); Florida, U.S.
- Occupations: Actor, dancer, choreographer
- Movement: Ballet/Modern dance
- Spouse: Gwenn Lewis

Joshua Alden "Jay" Norman (March 20, 1937 – November 14, 2021) was a dancer, actor, and choreographer known for his work in both stage and film productions, particularly in musical theater. He is best known and most closely associated with West Side Story, in which he performed on stage in the original Broadway production, and on tour nationally and internationally, as well as in the 1961 film adaptation. He was also a key member of Jerome Robbins’ "Ballets USA".

== Early life ==
Norman was born in Manhattan, New York, on March 20, 1937, to Joshua and Olga Norman (née Kennedy). Norman was raised in The Bronx and in the Bedford-Stuyvesant area. His father, a butcher by trade, was drafted into the US Army during World War 2. His mother, Olga, was a nurse, and in 1940 moved in with her aunt and mother. Norman then spent some time in the American Female Guardian Society and Home for the Friendless in the Bronx, where he was known as Jay. After returning from the war, Norman's father lived with the family for a short time before he and Olga separated, later to be officially divorced. At 15 years old, whilst attending vocational high school intending to become an automotive engineer, Norman's mother met his stepfather, who had a background in dancing and performed in nightclubs. Up to this point, Norman had excelled in athletics, swimming, and basketball. However, he was persuaded by his stepfather to take up dancing, believing it might help him develop his physique. After informal lessons at home, Norman was eager to pursue formal training but couldn't afford classes. A friend informed him about the School of Performing Arts (P.A.), and Norman enrolled for his junior and senior years. Initially, he found challenging the disciplined environment and the very different background his classmates’ had to his own. However, he found inspiration in ballet classes with Robert Joffrey and developed a passion for dance history, rhythmic analysis, and dance composition.

Norman's father was African-American and originally from Henderson, North Carolina. Norman's mother's parentage was Native American on her mother's side and African American on her father's. His maternal grandmother, Catheryne Holmes, was from Charles City, Virginia, and descended from the Holmes and Adkins families who were respectively closely associated with the Upper Mattaponi people and the Chickahominy people. Norman's maternal grandfather, Alden Garland Kennedy, was African-American and originally from Winston-Salem, North Carolina, and as a young man had been artist eventually becoming a lawyer.

== Career ==
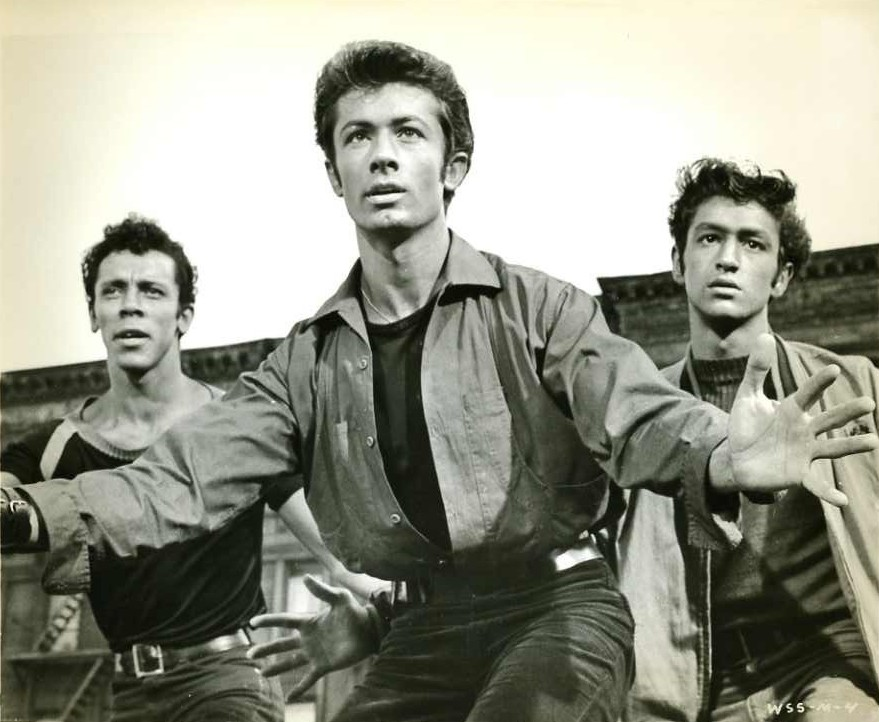
Jay Norman as Pepe (on the left) in the 1961 film adaptation of West Side Story with George Chakiris as Bernardo (centre) and Eddie Verso (Juano), right

Norman's professional journey began when he spent a summer dancing in the chorus of eight musicals at Pittsburgh’s summer theater. Later, he started teaching ballet at The Blackburn Twins School of Dance in Great Neck, Long Island. Though hired for ballet, his interest in jazz grew, leading him to study jazz dancing with Frank Wagner, Matt Mattox, and Luigi. In 1955, after another summer in Pittsburgh, where he danced solos in The King and I and Kismet, Jay joined forces with dancers Lenny Dale and Victor Duntiere for a six-month night club circuit tour.

His big break came in early 1957 when auditions for West Side Story were announced. Director-choreographer Jerome Robbins chose Norman from the hundreds of actors and dancers who attended a “cattle call” audition. He was cast as Juano. He was the youngest cast member in the original production. Norman was also the first member of the cast to be injured and although he was injured numerous times during the show's run, he only missed one performance, during the Philadelphia engagement.

Outside of West Side Story, Jay was seen prominently in Robbins’ Afternoon of a Faun and N.Y. Export: Opus Jazz and he was a key member of the "Ballets USA" European tour. When that tour ended he returned to New York and to West Side Story, and he understudied the role of Bernardo taking over for ten days in 1960. He then embarked on the second European tour of "Ballets USA", although before doing so married a fellow company member, Gwenn Lewis.

Norman was then cast in the movie version of West Side Story as Pepe, a member of the Sharks and Bernardo's lieutenant. After seven months of filming, he immediately flew out to join the European tour of West Side Story, this time in the role of Bernardo. Concurrently, "Ballets USA" was on its third European tour and he joined them for the last three weeks of that tour. He then participated in their two-week New York season, dancing in "The Cage" and "Events", where he alternated roles created by Glen Tetley.

In April 1962 he was to perform at a special White House presentation at a State Dinner hosted by President John F. Kennedy and First Lady Jacqueline Kennedy in honour of Mohammad Reza Pahlavi, the Shah of Iran, and his wife, Farah Pahlavi. He danced with Wilma Curley in a piece from Robbins’ Afternoon of a Faun and then solo in N.Y. Export: Opus Jazz. He was the first male ballet soloist to have the distinction of performing at the White House. When interviewed in 1981, Norman cited the White House performance as his proudest professional moment.

In March 1962, Jay began working with Lee Becker on her new jazz project, which debuted at the First International Jazz Festival in Washington, D.C., and later at the Boston Arts Festival. As well as being closely associated with Lee Becker's Jazz Ballet Theatre, Norman also taught jazz dance classes alongside Becker at the newly established Igor Youskevitch School.

He remained extremely active on Broadway throughout the 1960s and early 1970s, both as a dancer and latterly as a choreographer. In the early 1970s he joined the New Jersey Ballet and became a resident choreographer alongside George Tomal, with Tomal responsible for classical ballet whilst Norman was responsible for Jazz and modern ballet. Norman continued to choreograph for the NJ Ballet until the mid-1980s. By 1989, he was engaged by the Coupe Dance Studios, based in Rockland County, New York and continued with them until the early 1990s.

== Personal life ==
Jay Norman married Gwenn Lewis in 1959. By 1990, Gwenn had returned to San Francisco, California without Norman. After leaving Coupe Dance Studios, Norman left New York and moved to Ayden, North Carolina for a time, before moving to Deland, Florida in 2000, where he resided until he died on 14 November 2021.

== Productions ==
=== Theatre ===
- West Side Story, 1957, Original cast as Juano and 1960 revival as Juano and Bernardo; numerous other revivals
- Kiss Me, Kate, 1958 Revival
- Wildcat, 1960
- The King and I, 1960
- Donnybrook!, 1961
- Bajour, 1964
- Baker Street, 1965, as Murillo
- The Apple Tree, 1966, Ensemble, assistant choreographer.
- Sweet Charity, 1966
- Zorba, 1968
- Dear World, 1969, Assistant to the choreographer.
- Purlie, 1970
- Ride the Winds, 1974, Choreographer.

=== Dance focussed productions ===
- "Ballets USA", 1958, Jay Norman was part of the ensemble as a dancer. The show featured a collection of ballet pieces choreographed by Jerome Robbins including:
  - N.Y. Export: Opus Jazz
  - Afternoon of a Faun

=== Television ===
- The Arthur Godfrey Show,
- Âge Tendre et Tête de Bois, French TV show, 1964

=== Film ===
- West Side Story (1961 film) - Pepe, second-in-command of the Sharks
