= Andre Tayir =

American dancer, actor, and choreographer (1935–2003)

- Born: Dalton Herman Baker; September 16, 1935; Ariton, Alabama, U.S.
- Died: November 5, 2003 (aged 68); United States
- Known for: Dance, acting, choreography
- Movement: Musical theatre
- Spouse: Sarah Reed (m. 1962)
- Children: 3

Andre Tayir (born Dalton Herman Baker; September 16, 1935 – November 5, 2003) was an American dancer, choreographer, and actor. He is best known for his role as “Chili” in the film West Side Story (1961), his choreographic work on the television series Shindig!, and as co-director and choreographer of The Fabulous Palm Springs Follies.

== Early life ==
Andre Tayir was born Dalton Herman Baker on September 16, 1935, in Ariton, Alabama. He was raised in Eufaula, Alabama, where he grew up in a large family and was one of multiple siblings.

His father, Obie (O. N.) Baker (1899–1999), served as police chief of Eufaula, while his mother, Evie Garner (born 1901), came from an Alabama farming family. They married in 1920.

From an early age, Tayir demonstrated musical and performance ability. He sang in school and church choirs, directed the choir at Parkview Baptist Church, played piano, and served as drum major and assistant band director during his high school years.

He attended the University of Georgia’s Atlanta Division, majoring in music and drama. Three weeks before graduation, he left for New York City to pursue a professional performing career, a decision he later recalled was difficult for his parents to accept.

== Early career ==
Before adopting the stage name Andre Tayir, Herman Baker worked as a baritone singer and dancer in regional and touring musical theatre productions, including Damn Yankees, The Pajama Game, Carousel, and The Boy Friend. He also performed in the choruses of Oklahoma!, The King and I, and South Pacific.

His early professional training included three years as a principal dancer and assistant choreographer with the Southern Ballet Company, touring with Columbia Artists, and teaching modern dance for one year at Georgia State College.

In September 1957, at age 21, Tayir relocated to New York City with $14.26 and two suitcases containing personal belongings. He lived for several months in a hotel, subsisting on peanut butter, dry cereal, and coffee, while working intermittently as a temporary typist to support himself.

While in New York, Tayir took dance and acting classes and earned his Actors' Equity Association card after being hired as a dancer for a dance class. He later recalled that his daily routine involved 16- to 18-hour days combining classes, rehearsals, auditions, domestic responsibilities, and paid work.

== Breakthrough and film work ==
During his two and a half years in New York, Tayir did not secure a stage role and was preparing to leave the city when he was offered a part in the film adaptation of West Side Story (1961). He was cast as “Chili,” a member of the Sharks, after auditioning among thousands of performers nationwide.

Tayir had previously spent an extended period on the waiting list for the stage production of West Side Story, but he later stated that his height prevented his casting, as he was taller than other ensemble members and the gang leaders.

His selection for the film was reported in Alabama press coverage. An article published on page 3 of The Dothan Eagle on April 6, 1960, noted his departure from New York to join the production in California, identifying him as a former Eufaula resident and son of the city's police chief.

Tayir arrived in California in late May 1960 and immediately entered rehearsals for the film. Production involved approximately two months of rehearsals followed by five months of filming. Tayir later recalled that approximately 9,000 performers competed nationally for the 22 Sharks and Jets roles.

Although he had hoped to be cast as Bernardo, Tayir later described his relocation to California as “a great stroke of luck,” adding that he quickly came to regard California as home.

== Choreography and television ==
Following West Side Story, Tayir increasingly shifted his focus toward choreography. He supported himself in part by cleaning studios in exchange for acting instruction, including lessons from Leonard Nimoy.

He was later invited by producer Jack Good to choreograph The Beatles’ first television special. Tayir recalled that the experience drew intense public attention, with fans occasionally mistaking him for George Harrison.

Good subsequently hired Tayir to choreograph Shindig!, the first prime-time rock-and-roll television program. The show became a major success and provided Tayir with steady weekly employment during its run, coinciding with the birth of his first child.

After Shindig!, Tayir embarked on a new phase of his career touring with Andy Williams and The Lennon Sisters, contributing choreography and staging for live concert productions.

== Later career ==
Following the end of his first marriage in 1983, Tayir experienced a prolonged period of professional difficulty, including approximately four years of unemployment. He later stated that returning to work after this period proved challenging despite his previous credits, noting that professional recognition was not guaranteed by past success. In September 1991, Tayir was contacted by producer Riff Markowitz to collaborate on The Fabulous Palm Springs Follies. He served as co-director and choreographer of the vaudeville-style revue featuring performers aged 50 and older. The production opened in January 1992 at the Plaza Theatre in downtown Palm Springs and played to sold-out audiences through May 1992.

== Personal life ==
Tayir married Sarah Reed in 1962. The marriage ended in divorce in 1983. He married twice in total and later became a single parent, raising three children: Henner (born 1963), Fancy (born 1966), and Honora (born 1970).

== Selected works ==
- West Side Story (1961) – Chili
- A Taste of Honey (West Coast premiere) – Male lead
- Shindig! – Choreographer
- The Andy Williams Show – Choreographer
- Star Trek III: The Search for Spock (1984) – Choreographer
- The Fabulous Palm Springs Follies (1992) – Co-director and choreographer
