= Paloma García =

Paloma García may refer to:

- Paloma Garcia-Lee (born 1991), American actress and dancer
- Paloma García Ovejero (born 1975), Spanish journalist
