= West Side Story (2021 film) =

Film by Steven Spielberg

- Theatrical release poster
- Directed by: Steven Spielberg
- Screenplay by: Tony Kushner
- Based on: West Side Story (Note: The musical was inspired by William Shakespeare's play The Tragedy of Romeo and Juliet) by: Jerome Robbins; Leonard Bernstein; Stephen Sondheim; Arthur Laurents
- Produced by: Steven Spielberg; Kristie Macosko Krieger; Kevin McCollum
- Starring: Ansel Elgort; Rachel Zegler; Ariana DeBose; David Alvarez; Mike Faist; Brian D'Arcy James; Corey Stoll; Rita Moreno
- Cinematography: Janusz Kamiński
- Edited by: Michael Kahn; Sarah Broshar
- Music by: Leonard Bernstein
- Production companies: 20th Century Studios; Amblin Entertainment
- Distributed by: 20th Century Studios
- Release dates: November 29, 2021 (Jazz at Lincoln Center); December 10, 2021 (United States)
- Running time: 156 minutes
- Country: United States
- Languages: English; Spanish
- Budget: $100 million
- Box office: $76 million

West Side Story is a 2021 American musical romantic drama film directed and produced by Steven Spielberg and written by Tony Kushner. The second feature-length adaptation of the 1957 stage musical, itself inspired by William Shakespeare's play Romeo and Juliet, it stars Ansel Elgort as Tony and Rachel Zegler (in her film debut) as María, with Ariana DeBose, David Alvarez, Mike Faist, and Rita Moreno in supporting roles. Moreno, who starred in the 1961 film adaptation, also served as an executive producer alongside Kushner. The film features music composed by Leonard Bernstein with lyrics by Stephen Sondheim.

The film entered development in 2014 at 20th Century Studios (then named 20th Century Fox); Kushner began writing the screenplay in 2017. Spielberg was hired in January 2018, and casting began that September. Justin Peck choreographed the dance sequences. Principal photography occurred in New York and New Jersey; filming began in July 2019 and ran for two months.

West Side Story premiered at Jazz at Lincoln Center in New York City on November 29, 2021, three days after Sondheim's death. The film was later theatrically released by 20th Century Studios in the United States on December 10, after a year-long delay due to the COVID-19 pandemic. It received widespread acclaim, with some critics deeming it superior to the 1961 film, and was named one of the top ten films of 2021 by the National Board of Review and the American Film Institute. The recipient of many accolades, West Side Story garnered seven nominations at the 94th Academy Awards, including Best Picture, with DeBose winning Best Supporting Actress. However, the film was a box-office bomb, grossing $76 million against a $100 million production budget and estimated $300 million break-even target, though it achieved greater success through streaming and home video releases.

Since its release, it has been cited as one of the best musical films of all time as well as one of the best films of the 2020s and the 21st century. (Note: Attributed to multiple references:)

== Plot ==
In 1957, the Jets, a gang of white youths, brawl with the Sharks, a gang of Puerto Rican youths, for control of San Juan Hill on Manhattan's Upper West Side. New York City Police Department Sergeant Krupke and Lieutenant Schrank disband their latest scuffle, with Schrank deriding their conflict as pointless since the neighborhood will soon be demolished to make way for Lincoln Center. The gangs are too proud to care, and Jet leader Riff proposes a rumble between the two gangs. He approaches his friend Tony, who is on parole, for help. Tony declines, seeking self-reformation via Valentina, the Puerto Rican owner of Doc's general store. Meanwhile, María, Shark leader Bernardo's sister, is betrothed to his friend Chino, but yearns for an independent future. At a neighborhood dance in the community center that night, Tony and María meet and fall in love, infuriating Bernardo; however, Bernardo accepts Riff's terms to participate in the proposed rumble, provided that Tony attends as well. Tony later confesses his love to María on her fire escape, and they vow to reconvene the next day.

Bernardo and his girlfriend Anita compare life in New York to life in Puerto Rico, with Anita's belief in the American Dream contrasting with Bernardo's rude pessimism. Under police interrogation, the Jets feign obliviousness about the rumble. During their date at the Cloisters, Tony reveals to María that his year-long imprisonment for nearly beating a rival gang member to death had scared him into reforming. María makes Tony promise to stop the rumble, and they make promises to one another as if marrying before God. Later, Tony implores Riff to cancel the rumble by stealing his newly bought gun, but the Jets steal it back, with Riff reasserting that the rumble will happen as scheduled. Schrank orders Krupke and other police officers to quell the rumble, but they are unsuccessful. Arriving at the rumble, Tony speaks to Riff, who overconfidently relinquishes the gun. Tony then pacifistically explains his feelings for Maria to Bernardo, who injures him with his boxing skills before then targeting Riff. Responsively, Tony pins Bernardo down but stops short of punching him into unconsciousness. Unwilling to let Tony walk away, Bernardo pursues him with a knife. Ultimately, he fatally stabs Riff before being fatally stabbed by Tony. The gangs flee when the police arrive, and Chino walks away with Riff's gun.

María gushes about her love for Tony to her coworkers in the late-night cleaning crew at the Gimbels department store. Once their shift concludes, she encounters Chino, who reveals that Tony murdered Bernardo. She initially denies it until Tony arrives at her apartment later and confirms Chino's statement. Although initially furious with him, she begs him not to surrender to the police, and they plan to escape together. Valentina laments the recent deaths while reflecting on her interracial relationship with her deceased white husband Doc. After identifying Bernardo's body at the morgue, Anita returns home and sees María and Tony together as he leaves the apartment. Anita argues with María, but eventually accepts that the pair are in love.

At the boxing gym, Chino reveals his intention to kill Tony, despite the Sharks' warnings. While Schrank interrogates her at her apartment about Tony's whereabouts, María sends Anita to warn Tony by asking Valentina about the safety of "a cousin". However, at Doc's, Anita encounters the Jets, who insult and attempt to gang rape her, even as their girlfriends protest, until Valentina arrives and intervenes. Traumatized, Anita calls Valentina a traitor for housing the Jets, claims that Chino killed María, and vows to return to Puerto Rico.

Valentina condemns the Jets, who shamefully disperse, before relaying Anita's message to Tony, who runs into the streets, begging for Chino to kill him. As María arrives, to Tony's relief, Chino emerges and fatally shoots him. After Tony dies in her arms, a devastated María takes the gun and brandishes it at the gathered Jets and Sharks, berating them for the senseless deaths their conflict caused, before tearfully dropping the gun. As the police arrive to arrest Chino, the gangs finally end the feud by coming together to carry Tony's corpse into Doc's, with María following close behind.

== Cast ==
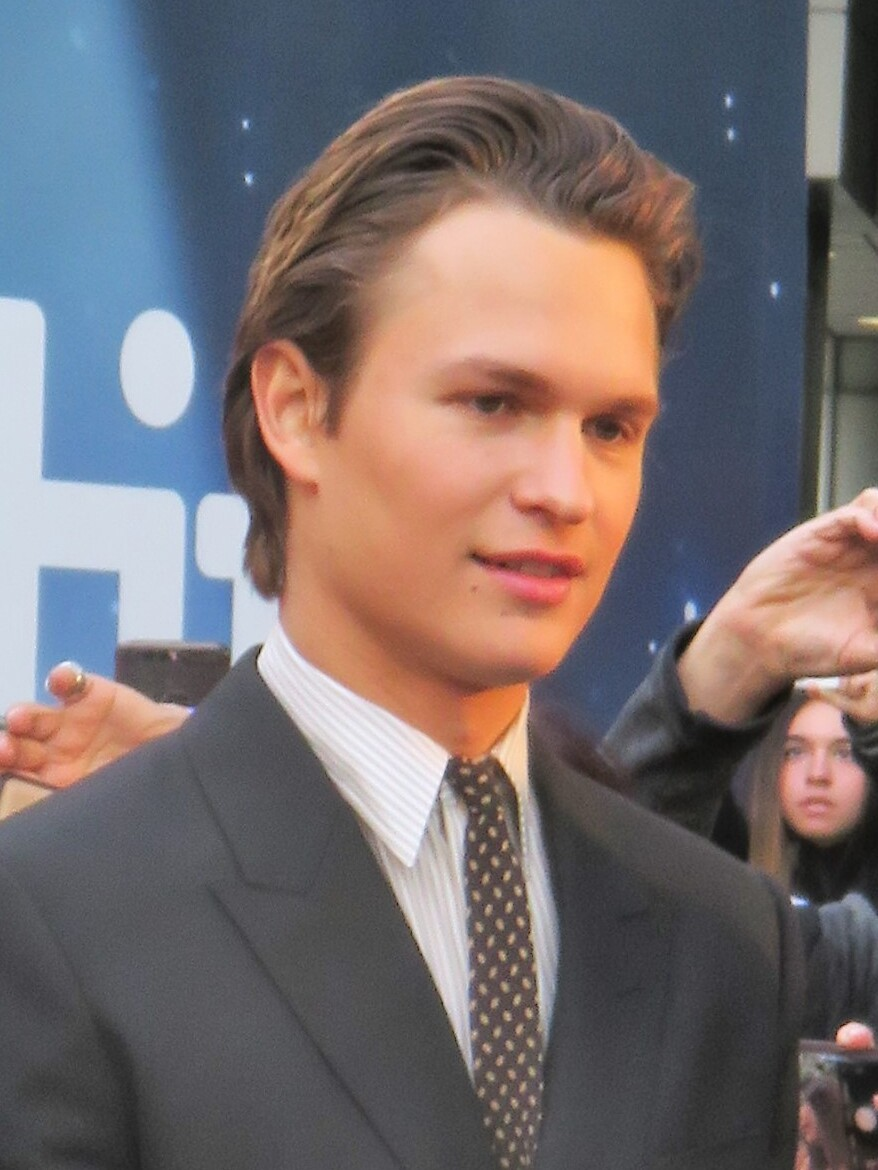
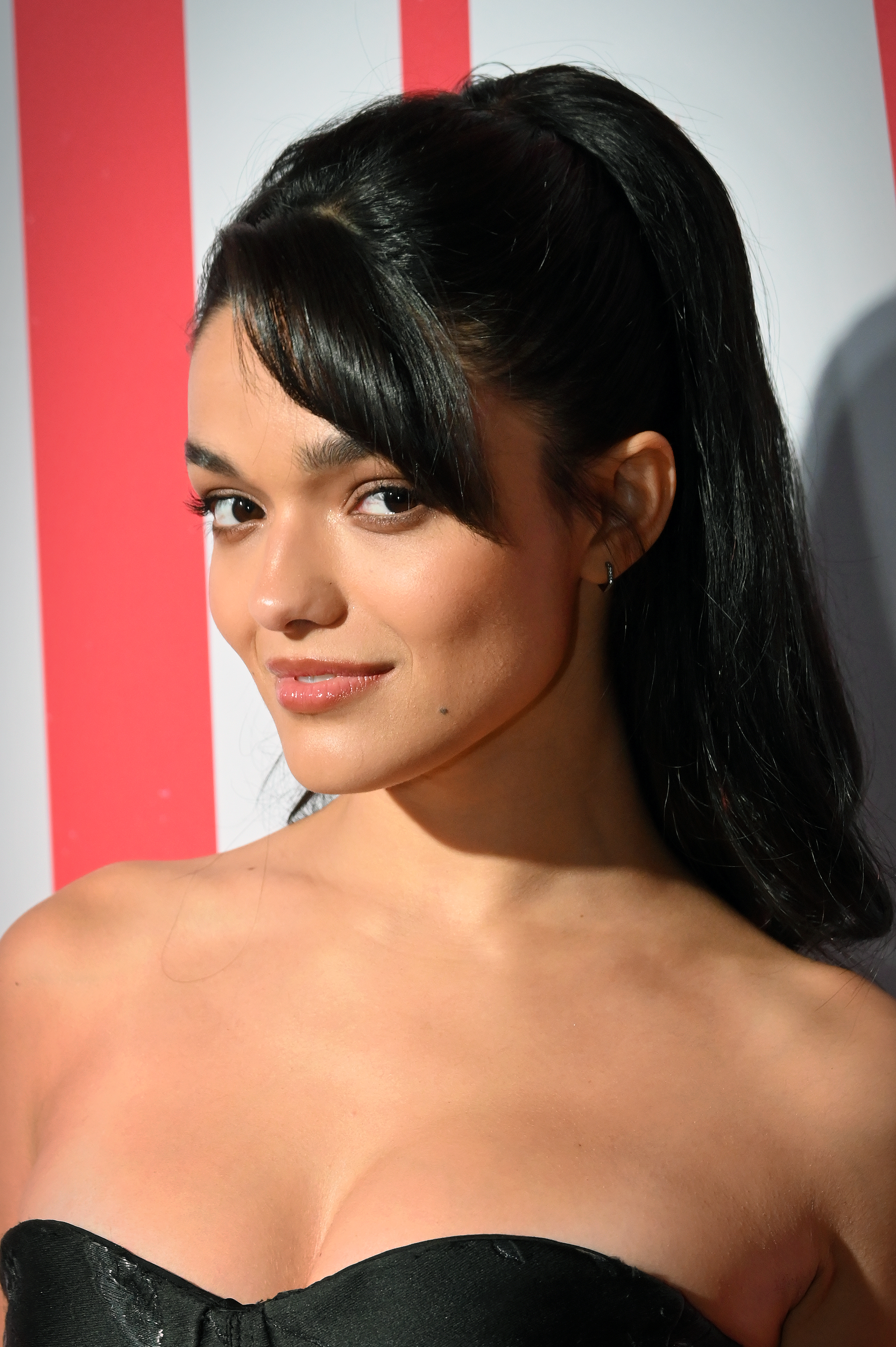
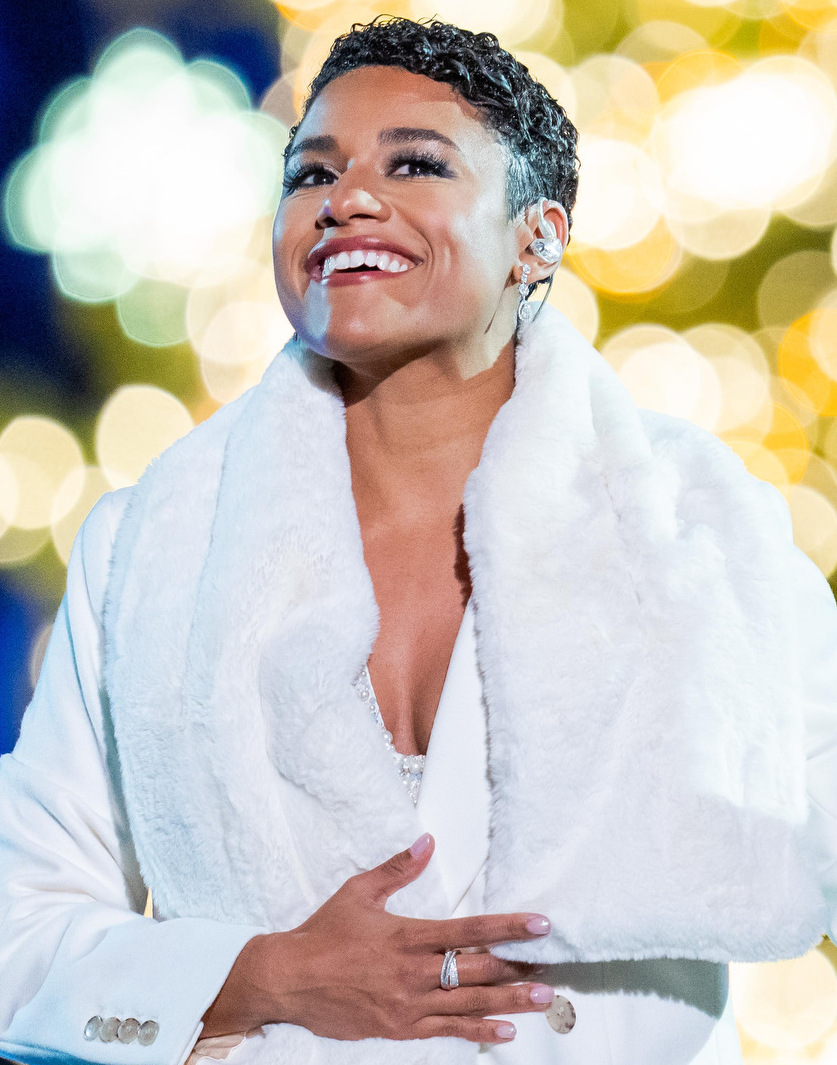
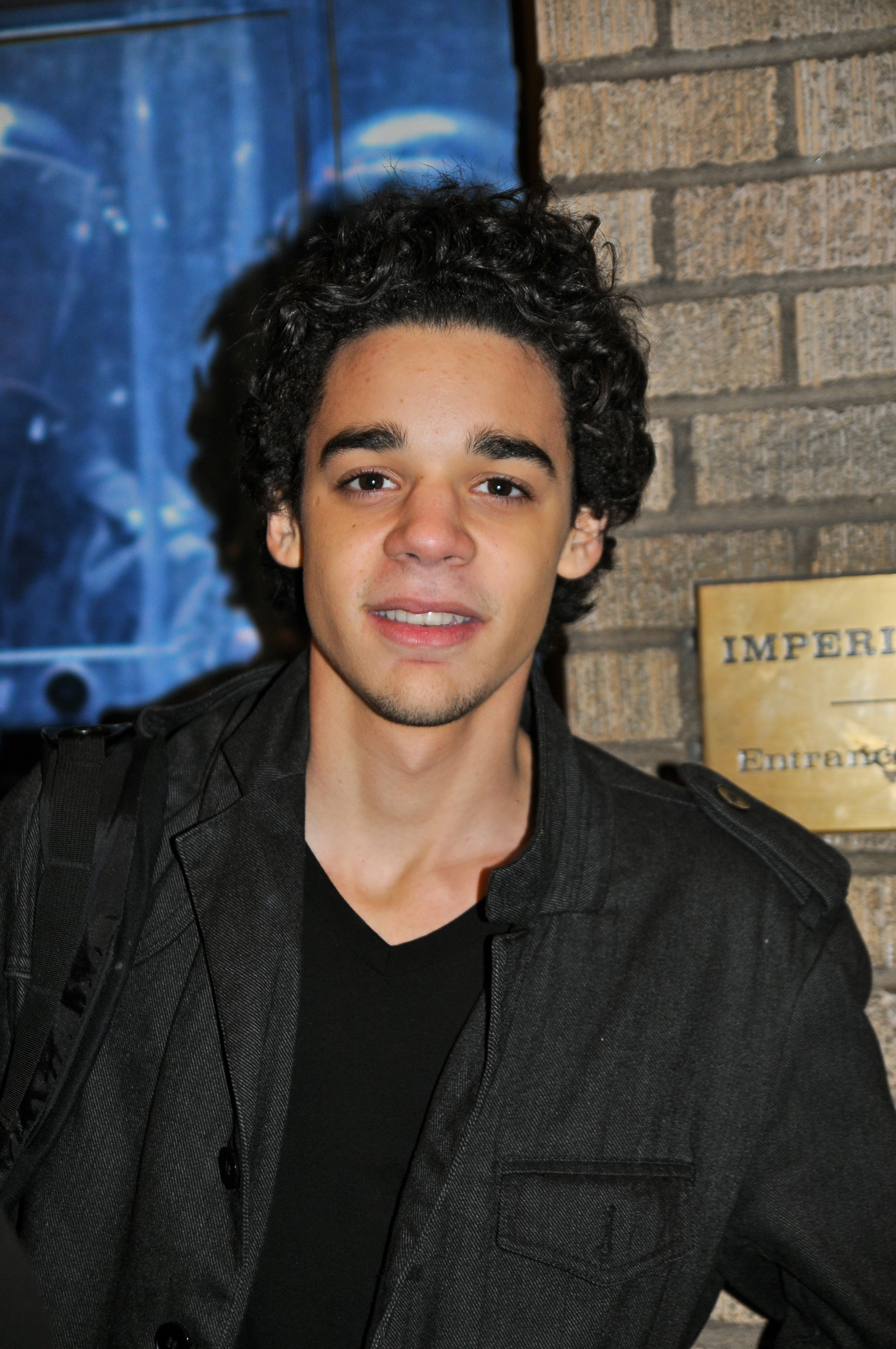
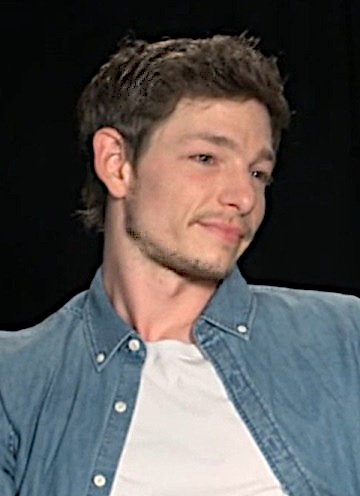
The film stars Ansel Elgort as Tony, Rachel Zegler as María, Ariana DeBose as Anita, David Alvarez as Bernardo and Mike Faist as Riff.
- Ansel Elgort as Tony
- Rachel Zegler as María
- Ariana DeBose as Anita
- David Alvarez as Bernardo
- Mike Faist as "Riff"
- Rita Moreno as Valentina (she was also Anita in the 1961 film adaptation)
- Brian d'Arcy James as Sergeant Krupke
- Corey Stoll as Lieutenant Schrank
- Josh Andrés Rivera as Chino
- Iris Menas as "Anybodys"
- Ana Isabelle as Rosalía
- Andréa Burns as Fausta
- Jamila Velazquez as "Meche"
- Yassmin Alers as Lluvia
- Jamie Harris as Rory
- Curtiss Cook as Abe
- Paloma Garcia-Lee as Graziella
- Kyle Coffman as "Ice"
- Sean Harrison Jones as "Action"
- Patrick Higgins as John "Baby John"
- Ben Cook as "Mouthpiece"
- Kyle Allen as Balkan
- Myles Erlick as "Snowboy"
- Talia Ryder as Tessa
- Maddie Ziegler as Velma
- Annelise Cepero as Provi

Three of the Jets from the 1961 film of West Side Story—Harvey Evans, who portrayed Mouthpiece; Bert Michaels, who played Snowboy; and David Bean, who played Tiger—appear as extras. Andréa Burns, who played María in the 1992–1993 European Tour of the musical, appears as Fausta.

== Production ==
=== Development ===
"I've always wanted to make a musical. Not like Moulin Rouge though – an old-fashioned, conservative musical. ... Like West Side Story or Singin' in the Rain. I've been looking for one for twenty years. I just need something that excites me".

— Steven Spielberg, 2004

In March 2014, Steven Spielberg first seriously expressed interest in directing an adaptation of West Side Story, prompting 20th Century Fox to acquire the rights to the project. Tony Kushner, who previously worked with Spielberg on Munich (2005) and Lincoln (2012), revealed in a July 2017 interview that he was writing the screenplay for the film, stating he would be leaving the musical numbers intact, and that the story would be closer to the original stage musical than to the 1961 film. In a 2020 interview, Spielberg told Vanity Fair: "West Side Story was actually the first piece of popular music our family ever allowed into the home. I ... fell completely in love with it as a kid". Spielberg would ultimately dedicate the film to his father, Arnold, who died during production at age 103.

The following year, he further explained why he felt the time had come for a new film adaptation of the musical:

"Divisions between un-likeminded people is as old as time itself. ... And the divisions between the Sharks and the Jets in 1957, which inspired the musical, were profound. But not as divided as we find ourselves today. It turned out in the middle of the development of the script, things widened, which I think in a sense, sadly, made the story of those racial divides – not just territorial divides – more relevant to today's audience than perhaps it even was in 1957".

=== Pre-production ===
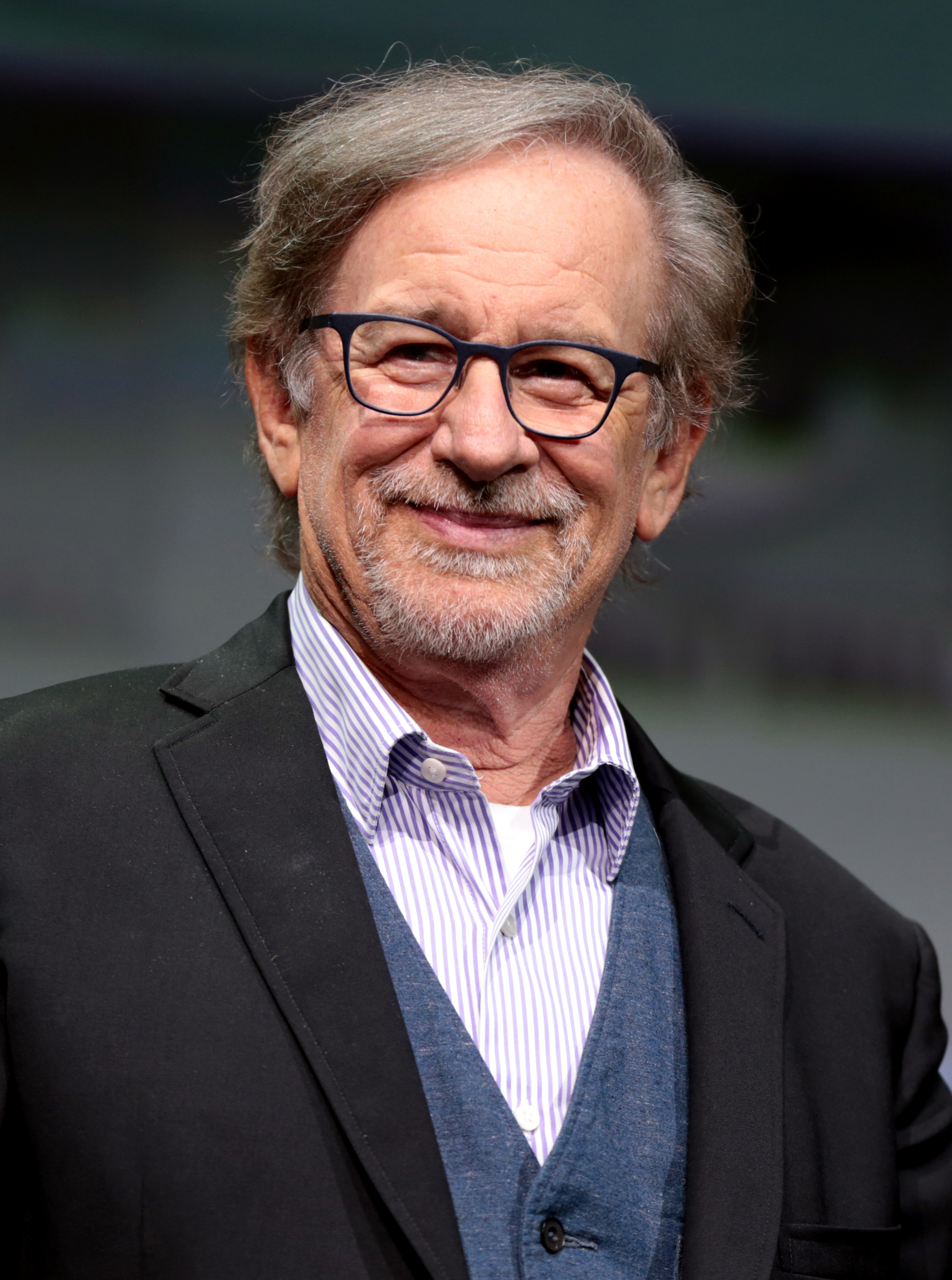
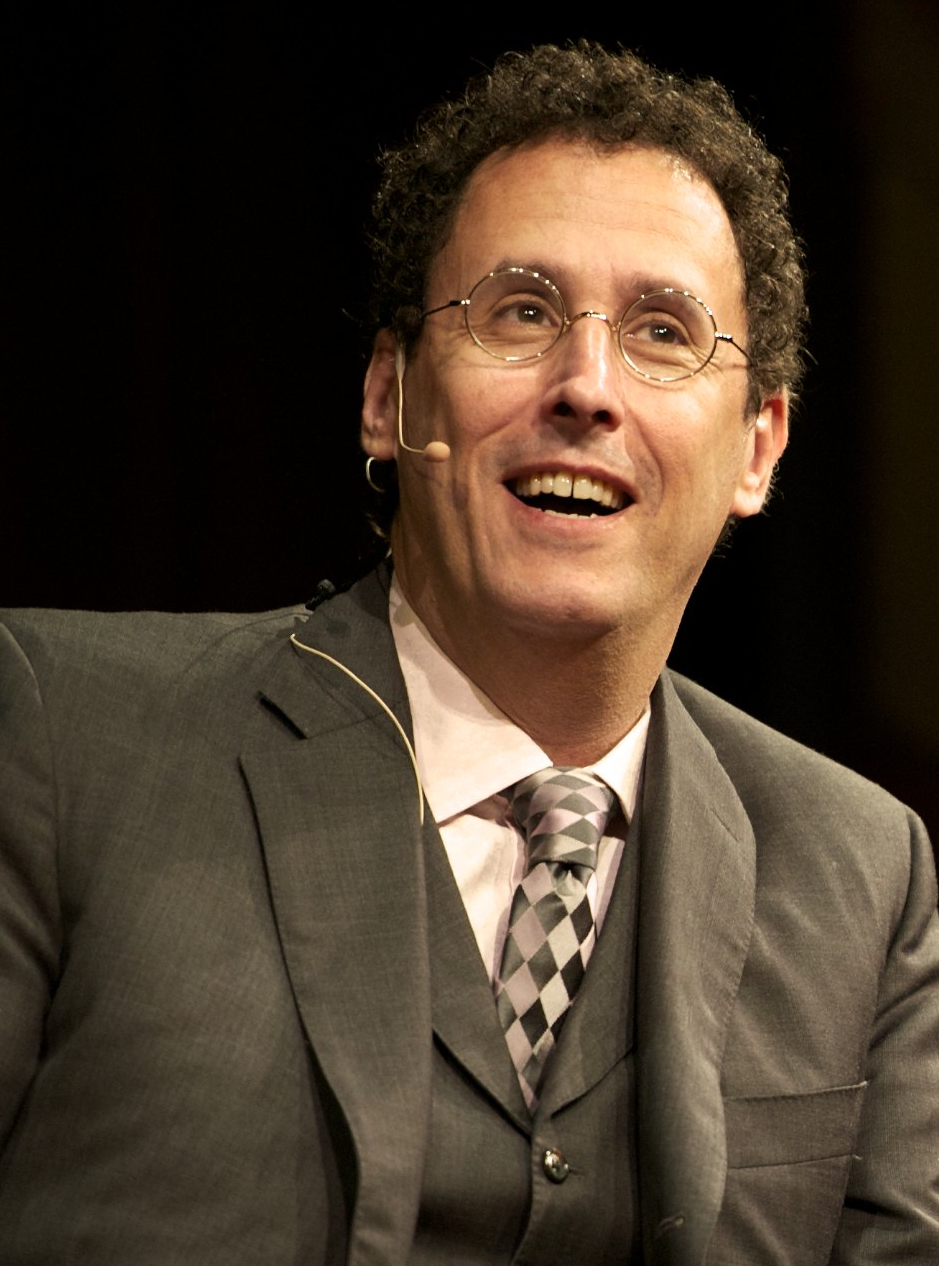
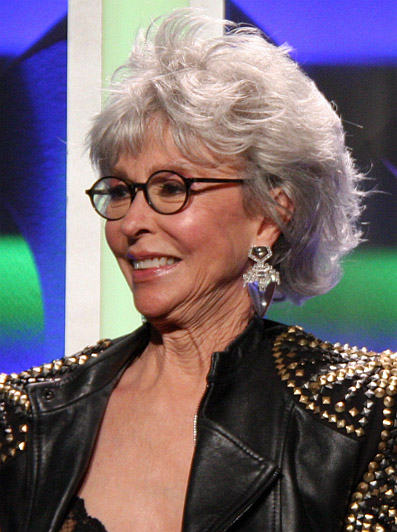
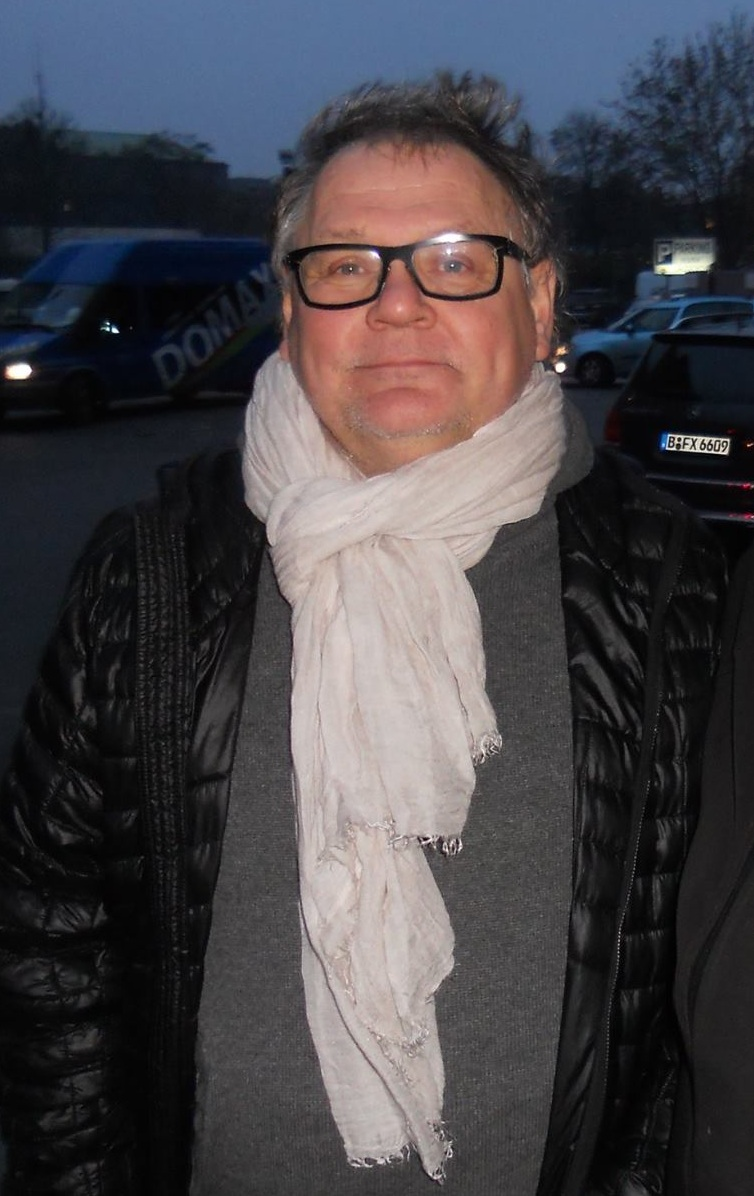
Director Steven Spielberg, screenwriter Tony Kushner, actress/executive producer Rita Moreno and cinematographer Janusz Kamiński

In January 2018, Spielberg was figuring out his next two directorial vehicles. Sources said that he was eyeing a fifth Indiana Jones film and then would either precede or follow quickly with another film. It was reported that one might be his dream project, a new version of West Side Story. This was followed a few days later with an open casting call issued for the characters María, Tony, Anita and Bernardo. Additional open casting calls were hosted in New York City in April, and in Orlando, Florida, in May. In July, the fifth Indiana Jones film was pushed back, allowing Spielberg to begin pre-production on West Side Story.

Justin Peck was hired to choreograph the film in September, with Ansel Elgort cast in the film as Tony. In November, Eiza González emerged as a contender for the role of Anita. Rita Moreno, who played Anita in the 1961 film, plays Valentina and also serves as an executive producer for the film. In January 2019, newcomer Rachel Zegler was picked from over 30,000 applicants to play María, with Ariana DeBose, David Alvarez, and Josh Andrés Rivera also cast as Anita, Bernardo, and Chino, respectively. Isabela Merced also auditioned for Maria. In March, Corey Stoll and Brian d'Arcy James joined the cast. A month later, the rest of the ensemble comprising the Jets and Sharks factions was announced. Mike Faist was personally invited to audition by Spielberg, who approached him after seeing him in Dear Evan Hansen on Broadway in 2016. He originally auditioned for Tony, before being cast as Riff instead.

=== Filming ===
Filming took place in Harlem and other Manhattan locations and in Flatlands, Brooklyn in New York City in July 2019. There were ten days of shooting in Paterson, New Jersey, where an outdoor set was built, in August. Filming also took place in Newark and other parts of Essex County, New Jersey. It wrapped on September 27 for a total of 79 days of shooting. All of the sets were constructed at a warehouse at Steiner Studios.

As one of the film's executive producers, Moreno was on-set for a large portion of production, often consulting with Peck on choreography. Moreno described shooting the scene where Valentina saves Anita as particularly difficult, due to her own well-documented experiences with sexual assault in Hollywood, as well as the surreal challenge of saving a character she played six decades prior. The scene was rehearsed with an intimacy coordinator to ensure DeBose's safety during the scene: Moreno, who recalled crying hysterically and being unable to stop when she shot the same scene for the 1961 film, was surprised that such a position existed upon being told about it in a joint interview with her and DeBose. She also had the honor to do clapperboard for the film's famous "puddle shot" of Tony stepping into a large puddle of water and making it become a pool of rippling light while singing "María". That shot was the last to be filmed on the final day of principal photography, as it was a last-minute suggestion made by cinematographer Janusz Kamiński to Spielberg following completion of the Balcony scene.

The beginning of "The Dance at the Gym" sequence involved three different shots stitched together to make it look like one continuous shot, beginning as Steadicam and becoming a cable cam shot "that goes up into the air and over to the other side of the gym".

The beginning of "The Dance at the Gym" sequence involved three different shots stitched together to make it look like one continuous shot. Kamiński described that it "starts as Steadicam, bringing the actors down the hallway, then as soon as the doors open up, it transitions into a cable cam shot that goes up into the air and over to the other side of the gym". He went on to mention that its execution was also laid upon the film's lighting team: "We had our lights rigged on the dimmer so when the camera was turning around, some sections of the scene would dim out, another section would dim up with the lights. You set the light so it's in one direction, then when you turn around, you have to either cut or relight or do lights in the dimming board so you can fade the lights in, or fade the lights out, so you can maintain the romance and beauty of the shot". Andy Aaron, who served as sound effects recordist, added that the dance footsteps during the sequence were recorded live on set, allowing those tracks to be used in the final sound mix without the music intruding. In conclusion, Kamiński added that the shot "gives a very clear indication to the audience what this particular scene will be about. It's about two teams competing against each other in terms of which team has the better dancers, better performers, more charming and more enticing". This moment from the film went viral on social media, and filmmaker Guillermo del Toro described it as "extremely hard to execute". Rachel Zegler also noted the shot's significance, describing it as "very Spielberg-esque."

Spielberg and Sondheim initially wanted to cut "I Feel Pretty" from the film. Its presence in the original musical, right after the rumble, was largely done against the wishes of Sondheim: he and Bernstein had been instructed by the producers to add an upbeat song after intermission to start Act 2, and so the song was written in protest. Sondheim would later remark that he was embarrassed by its lyrical content, to the point that he allowed it to be cut from the 2020 Broadway revival directed by Ivo van Hove. Spielberg, likewise, questioned whether the upbeat song would still work without an intermission between it and the rumble. It was ultimately due to the intervention of Tony Kushner that the song remained, as Spielberg later explained, "Tony [Kushner] explained to me, and then I explained to Stephen... that this is the first time in our story that the entire audience is ahead of María's story. And the audience will feel very protective of her because we know she's about to find out".

=== Choreography ===
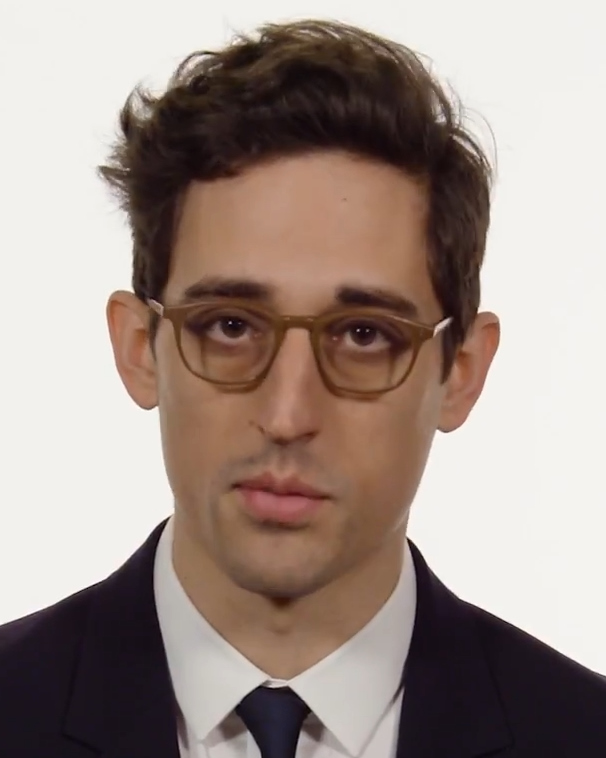
Justin Peck created the film's new choreography while paying homage to the original choreography by Jerome Robbins.

Choreographer Justin Peck, cinematographer Janusz Kamiński, and Spielberg worked closely on how the film's choreography would work in concert with the camera. Spielberg was constantly present during the film's dance rehearsals and would use the camera on his hand-held iPhone to figure out how to frame the shots.

Peck noted that dance in movie-musicals had grown into something of a joke in the past several decades, with the 1961 film receiving some light mockery for depicting violent gang warfare with ballet movements. Mindful of the new film's more realistic approach to material, he chose to treat the dance as symbolic of the unity between the gangs: "We have to remember that it is still a musical and that there's a unique kind of expression that exists in it. This isn't full blown realism, literal realism". Peck cites "Cool" as the dance sequence most indicative of this approach, combining virtuoso ballet movements with the dangerous violence of the scene in the fight over the gun.

The film does not attempt to recreate the Jerome Robbins choreography used in most productions of the stage show and in the 1961 film. However, Peck and the creative team were mindful of Robbins' integral role in the movement language of the show, and occasionally reused Robbins' movements for nostalgia. Spielberg cites the Rumble as an example: the scene initially reuses some of the Robbins choreography but as it grows more intense more of Peck's original choreography is used. Peck also highlighted the skirt flaring in "America" and Tony and María's dance at the gym as direct "quotes" of the Robbins choreography. "America", which in the 1961 film takes place on a rooftop at night, was restaged to take place on the streets of New York during the day. The shoot took 10 days at locations across Harlem, Queens, and Paterson. Ariana DeBose's dance shoes melted and had to be replaced multiple times throughout the shoot, due to a combination of hot weather and the intensity of the choreography.

Although a few dance doubles are credited in the film as they were required to be on standby for the underage actors, all of the film's actors performed their own dancing with no doubles. This included Ansel Elgort, who is a former student of the School of American Ballet.

=== Costumes ===
Paul Tazewell, known for his work on Hamilton and The Wiz Live!, served as costume designer for the film. For inspiration, he looked to a variety of sources including real-life photographs of 1950s life, some in color by Gordon Parks. To distinguish the two gangs from one another visually, he had the Jets dressed in cool-toned colors to reflect "the steel, the concrete, the streets of New York City as it was in the 1950s" and the Sharks in warm-toned colors to represent "where they've come from of Puerto Rico, of the island, having a tropical feel, many of the dresses of the Sharks, I reserved all of the floral pattern for that group for the Puerto Rican community".

== Musical numbers ==
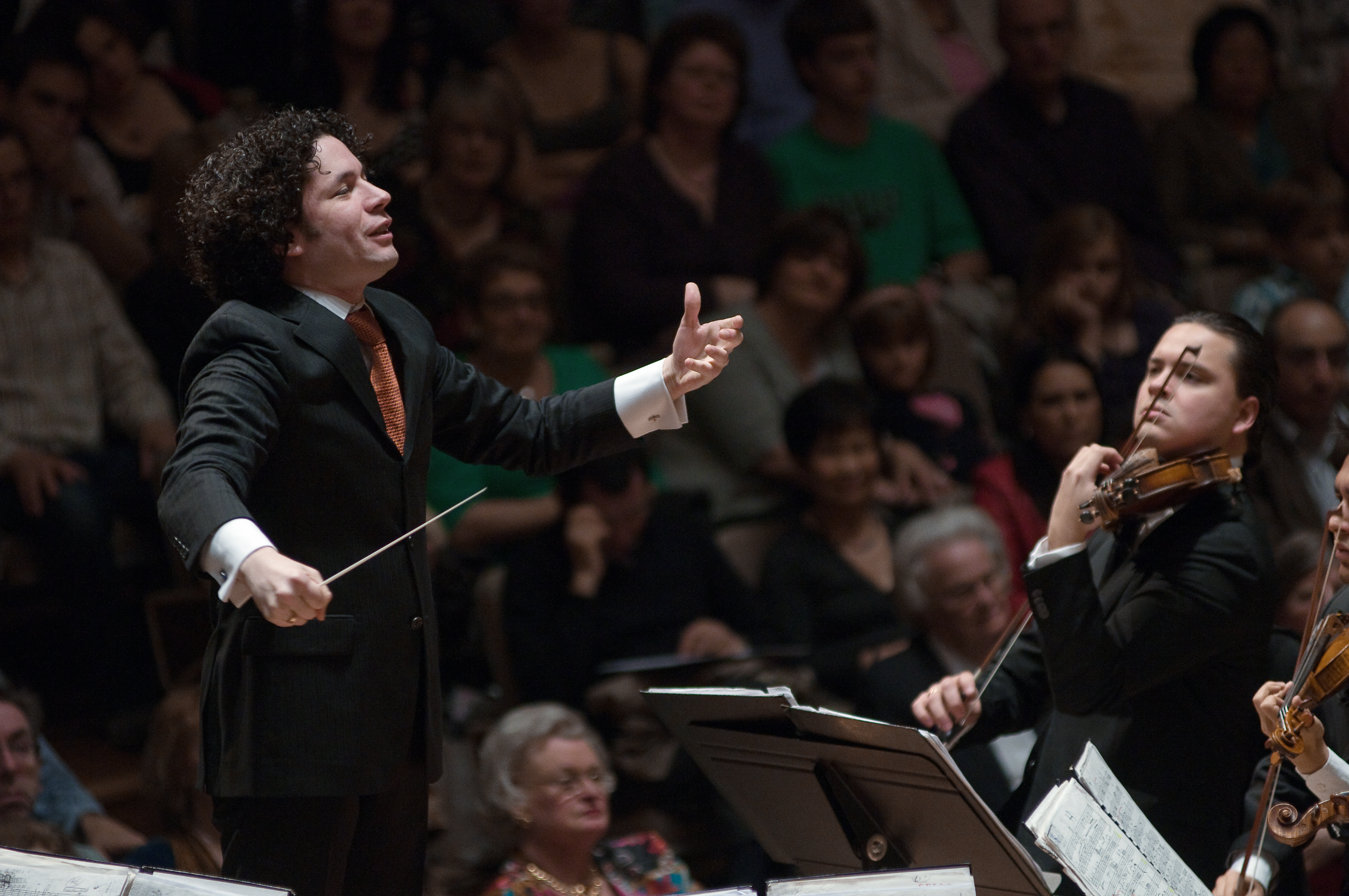
Gustavo Dudamel, pictured here in 2009, conducted the New York Philharmonic and Los Angeles Philharmonic during the film's recording sessions.

Spielberg initially approached his frequent collaborator John Williams to serve as the film's music director. Williams instead suggested composer David Newman and conductor Gustavo Dudamel. While Williams instead served as a music consultant, Newman arranged and adapted Bernstein's original score for the film, incorporating alterations originally made to Bernstein's Broadway score by Johnny Green for the 1961 film (e.g., interpolation of the "Cool" fugue motif into the "Prologue", the extended trumpet solo in "Mambo"). Dudamel conducted the New York Philharmonic during the film's recording sessions in 2019, with additional recording by the Los Angeles Philharmonic done during the COVID-19 pandemic the following year. Jeanine Tesori and Matt Sullivan served as vocal coach and music supervisor, respectively, while Williams served as music consultant. All of the songs were pre-recorded and used as playback on set, with the exceptions of "One Hand, One Heart", "Somewhere" and "A Boy like That/I Have a Love", which did not use the playback and were instead sung live on set. Portions of "María" were also sung live on set without the playback, as per Elgort's request.

- "Prologue" – Orchestra
- "La Borinqueña" (Sharks version) – Bernardo, Quique, Braulio & Sharks
- "Jet Song" – Riff, Ice, Diesel, Big Deal, A-Rab, Baby John & Jets
- "Something's Coming" – Tony
- "The Dance at the Gym: Blues, Promenade" – Orchestra
- "The Dance at the Gym: Mambo" – Orchestra
- "The Dance at the Gym: Cha-Cha, Meeting Scene, Jump" – Orchestra
- "María" – Tony
- "Balcony Scene (Tonight)" – María & Tony
- "Transition to Scherzo" / "Scherzo" – Orchestra
- "America" – Anita, Bernardo, Rosalía, Luz, Sharks & Shark Girls
- "Gee, Officer Krupke" – Diesel, Big Deal, A-Rab, Mouthpiece, Snowboy, Baby John & Balkan
- "One Hand, One Heart" – Tony & María
- "Cool" – Tony, Riff, Ice, Action, Tiger & Numbers
- "Tonight Quintet" – Riff, Bernardo, Anita, Tony, María, Jets & Sharks
- "The Rumble" – Orchestra
- "I Feel Pretty" – María, Luz, Rosalía, Fausta, Charita, Lluvia, Meche & Provi
- "Somewhere" – Valentina
- "A Boy like That/I Have a Love" – Anita & María
- "Mambo" (reprise) – Orchestra
- "Tonight" (reprise) – María
- "Finale" – Orchestra

== Soundtrack ==
The soundtrack album was released digitally in Dolby Atmos by Hollywood Records on December 3, and physically on December 10, 2021.

== Release ==
=== Theatrical ===
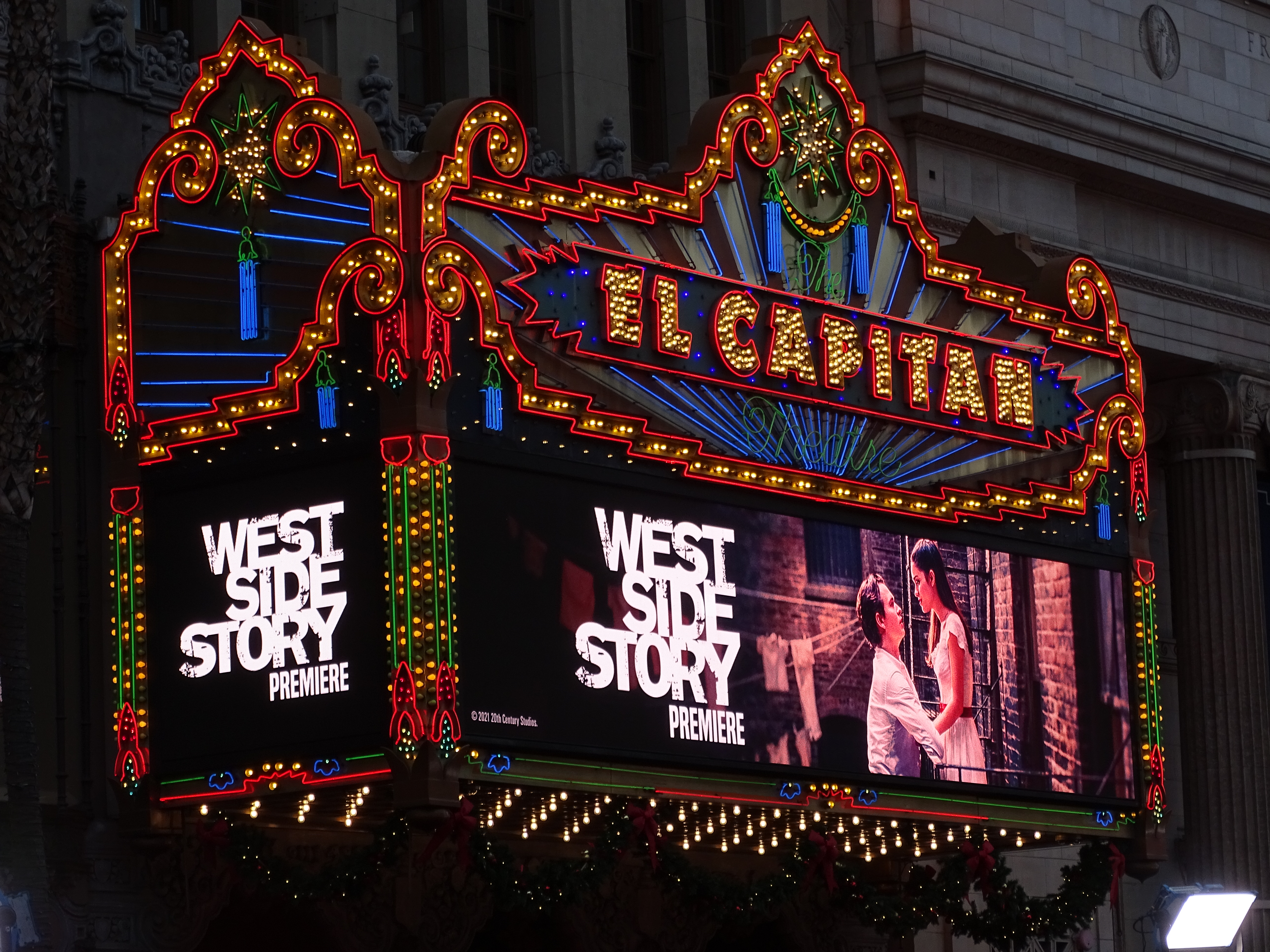
The film held its Los Angeles premiere at the El Capitan Theatre on December 7, 2021.

West Side Story was initially scheduled to be distributed in the United States on December 18, 2020, by Walt Disney Studios Motion Pictures through the 20th Century Studios label, but in September 2020, due to the COVID-19 pandemic, Disney delayed the release date to December 10, 2021, which coincided with the 60th anniversary of the release of the 1961 film. The film had an exclusive 45-day theatrical run, including engagements in Dolby Cinema and IMAX. An IMAX fan event, with a live Q&A with Spielberg and the cast, took place in IMAX theaters nationwide on December 6. Deadline Hollywood reported that Disney considered a limited release strategy for the film before expanding into wide release, but opted not to due to ramifications caused by the COVID-19 pandemic in the exhibition market.

The film was first screened for members of the cast, including Zegler, Faist, Andrés Rivera and some members of the ensemble, at the David H. Koch Theater in Lincoln Center on November 17. The screening was one of Sondheim's final appearances before his death on November 26. It then screened for industry and critics at its world premiere on November 29 at Jazz at Lincoln Center's Rose Theater, followed by Los Angeles at the El Capitan Theatre on December 7.

=== Home media ===
West Side Story became available to stream on Disney+ and HBO Max on March 2, 2022. The film was released on 4K Ultra HD Blu-ray, Blu-ray and DVD on March 15 by Walt Disney Studios Home Entertainment through the 20th Century Home Entertainment label.

=== Marketing ===
During the 93rd Academy Awards telecast in April 2021, DeBose introduced the film's teaser trailer, and Moreno later presented the Academy Award for Best Picture, commemorating the 1961 film's release and awards wins. The film's official trailer premiered on September 15 on ABC's Good Morning America. An exclusive look at the film, featuring extended sneak peeks at the "Dance at the Gym" and "America" scenes, was presented at the 49th Annual American Music Awards on November 22, introduced by Elgort and Zegler.

A book by Laurent Bouzereau about the making of the film, featuring interviews with the cast and crew, was released by Abrams Books on November 16 the same year. A television special, Something's Coming: West Side Story – A Special Edition of 20/20, aired on ABC on December 5.

=== Censorship ===
Deadline Hollywood reported that the film was initially banned in all the Gulf Cooperation Council countries, believed likely due to the role of Anybodys being a transgender character, as played by non-binary actor iris menas. (Note: menas has said they prefer not to use uppercase letters for their name.) In some cases, Disney has allegedly refused to make cuts requested by censors. An earlier Disney release, Eternals, was also banned in the GCC countries, except the United Arab Emirates albeit with some cuts to intimacy scenes. That film featured Marvel's first openly same-sex couple. The cast and creative team responded, with co-producer Kevin McCollum telling The Hollywood Reporter: "I think we have to remember that during Shakespeare's time, at the height, the Puritans came in and tore all of the theaters down. You couldn't go to the theater, and yet Shakespeare survived. ... I believe that love will win, and this is a story about love, made with love, and what happens when you try to keep people from loving freely. ... I think we've done our jobs as artists to make this film, and the world will discover it even if certain cultures decide they don't want it in their borders". West Side Story eventually released in cinemas in the United Arab Emirates around a month later.

=== Live presentations ===
A special presentation of the film accompanied by Gustavo Dudamel and the Los Angeles Philharmonic performing the score live took place at the Hollywood Bowl on July 12 and 14, as part of its Summer 2022 season. Another live-to-film presentation, accompanied by David Newman and the New York Philharmonic, performing the score of this film adaptation for the first time since the 2019-2020 recording sessions, took place from September 12–17, 2023 at David Geffen Hall in Lincoln Center, as part of the Philharmonic's The Art of the Score series and as the first event of their 2023–24 season.

== Reception ==
=== Box office ===
West Side Story was a box-office bomb, grossing $38.5 million in the United States and Canada, and $37.5 million in other territories, for a worldwide total of $76 million. The film needed an estimated $300 million in order to break even.

Worldwide, the film was initially projected to gross $22–31 million in its opening weekend, including $12–17 million in the United States and Canada. Boxoffice Pro projected the film would earn $14–22 million in its opening weekend and around $55–85 million from its total domestic box office run. It earned $800,000 domestically in Thursday previews, hinting the film would flop in the opening weekend with contributing factors such as the reluctance to go to theaters amidst the COVID-19 pandemic, and the recent trend of musical films disappointing at the box office, exemplified by In the Heights and Dear Evan Hansen. The film made $4.1 million on its opening day (including previews) and went on to debut to $10.6 million, topping the box office but finishing below estimates, making it a box-office bomb. Audiences were 57% female and 52% over the age of 35; 52% were Non-Hispanic White, 30% Hispanic or Latino, 6% Black, and 12% Asian or of other origins. According to EntTelligence, around 800,000 people bought tickets to see the film during its opening weekend. Jeremy Fuster of TheWrap was hopeful the film could recover throughout the Christmas holiday season as a sleeper hit, similar to what happened with The Greatest Showman (2017), through ongoing positive word-of-mouth and awards-season buzz. In its second weekend, the film earned $3.7 million, placing third behind Spider-Man: No Way Home and Encanto. The film made $2.8 million in its third weekend, $2.2 million in its fourth, and $1.4 million in its fifth.

Outside the United States and Canada, the film made $4.4 million in its opening weekend from 37 international markets, of which $1.3 million came from IMAX. The highest-grossing countries were the United Kingdom ($1.7 million), France ($1.1 million), Germany ($300,000), Russia, and the Netherlands (both $200,000). The film earned $2.1 million in its second weekend, $1.7 million in its third, $1.9 million in its fourth, $1.6 million in its fifth, and another $1.6 million in its sixth.

In his final week as Disney chairman in 2021, Bob Iger said the company "did a brilliant job marketing" the film, but speculated that its weak performance could be due to competition with streaming services, the cost of theater tickets, and the effect of the COVID-19 pandemic. However, Kyle Buchanan of The New York Times blamed "the marketing campaign, which missed crucial opportunities", including leveraging Spielberg, "the movie's biggest name". Sarah Whitten of CNBC observed the film was targeted towards older audiences, who were less likely to go to theaters due to the pandemic, particularly with the rise in the Omicron variant. She further noted the film lacked big names in the cast (save for Ansel Elgort and Rita Moreno) and was released around the same time as Spider-Man: No Way Home, all factors that could have hurt its ability to perform well at the box office.

=== Audience viewership ===
By March 20, 2022, according to Samba TV, West Side Story had streamed on Disney+ and HBO Max in a combined 1.9 million households in the United States since the Oscar nomination announcements on February 8.

=== Critical response ===
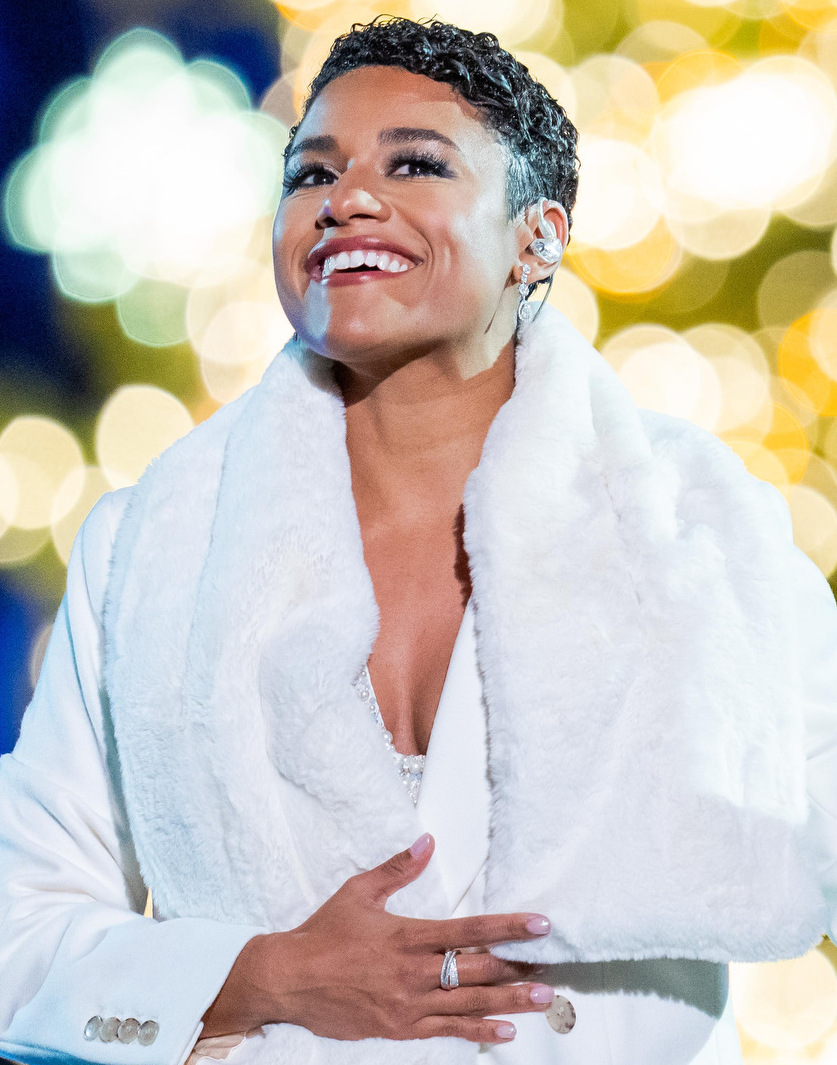
Ariana DeBose received critical acclaim for her performance and won the Academy Award for Best Supporting Actress.

On the review aggregator website Rotten Tomatoes, 91% of 393 critics' reviews are positive, with an average rating of 8.2/10. The website's consensus reads: "Steven Spielberg's West Side Story presents a new look at the classic musical that lives up to its beloved forebear – and in some respects might even surpass it." Metacritic, which uses a weighted average, assigned the film a score of 85 out of 100, based on 62 critics, indicating "universal acclaim". Audiences polled by CinemaScore gave the film an average grade of "A" on an A+ to F scale, while those polled by PostTrak gave it an 88% overall positive score, with 70% saying they would definitely recommend it.

Critics praised West Side Story for its cast performances, Spielberg's direction, musical numbers, visual style, and cinematography. Chris Evangelista of /Film wrote: "Spielberg's West Side Story is a knock-out. A dynamite blend of old-school musical showmanship and modern sensibilities. It's one of the best movies of the year, and one of the best movies of the acclaimed filmmaker's career. Yes, really". Peter Bradshaw of The Guardian wrote: "Spielberg quite rightly doesn't try hiding any of those stage origins. His mastery of technique is thrilling; I gave my heart to this poignant American fairytale of doomed love". Helen O'Hara of Empire gave the film five stars and wrote: "Heartfelt and heart-breaking, this feels like Spielberg has made an adaptation faithful to its roots but also, always, alive to the modern world".

Jason Bailey of The Playlist wrote, "West Side Story moves like a freight train, its 156 minutes passing in barely a breath, and that breakneck pace, combined with the expressionist aesthetic and candy-colored imagery, reminds us that blockbusters don't have to be greyscaled dreck". Richard Lawson of Vanity Fair wrote that "Spielberg and Kushner have done justice to what Bernstein, Robbins, and the quite recently late Stephen Sondheim made all those years ago – not subverting its enduring value, but rather, with fire and grace, doing so much to earn it". Owen Gleiberman of Variety opined that the film "has a brash effervescence. You can feel the joy he got out of making it, and the kick is infectious". However, Richard Brody of The New Yorker panned the film, saying that the film's creators "made ill-conceived additions and misguided revisions".

It was named one of the top ten films of 2021 by the National Board of Review and the American Film Institute. Metacritic reported that the film appeared on 66 film critics' top ten lists for 2021 in being among the top ten films with the most appearances as it ranked first on 10 lists and second on 7 lists.

=== Representation of Puerto Ricans ===
Some Latinos were critical of the remake. Arlene Dávila wrote in an op-ed in El Nuevo Día: "It's sad to realize once again the reality that Puerto Ricans and Latinos will be reduced to made-up themes and ideas taken from the playbook of what 'Puerto Rican' and 'Latino' are to the white imagination because what's certain is that nowadays Hollywood is whiter and more exclusionary than ever". Mandy Velez criticized the casting: "Once again, the actress playing the character of María is not Puerto Rican".

Aurora Flores questioned the use of accents in the film and wrote: "In the end, you need more than just an advisory board. You need writers, directors, and producers. We need our stories told, our way". Arlene Dávila echoed this sentiment: "It's high time to say enough with the half-baked remakes, imports, and adaptations, and to start demanding productions and original content that is written and produced by our diverse community".

Josie Meléndez Hernández praised the film's portrayal of Puerto Ricans: "Many have been nervous about this new iteration of the musical. The original gave way to a stereotypical view of Puerto Ricans and our culture, which has affected how we are portrayed in the media since then. This time around, with Spielberg at the helm, it is safe to say that many of the harmful pieces of the first adaptation were patched up." Hernández also noted that the film had "a better depiction of Puerto Ricans" while suggesting it "is not a musical for Latines".

== Legacy ==
Since its release, the film continues to receive acclaim and is regarded as one of Spielberg's best films and one of the best musical films of all time. In 2022, filmmaker Quentin Tarantino voiced his praise for both this film and Top Gun: Maverick, saying that they "...both provided a true cinematic spectacle, the kind that I'd almost thought that I wasn't going to see anymore." Filmmaker Edgar Wright also praised the film, saying, "For those who had an inkling Spielberg had a great musical in him (see set pieces in both 1941 & Temple of Doom) will be giddy at the sheer verve of his West Side Story. I was knocked out by it. Tony Kushner's changes to the script are smart & emotional too." In 2023, it ranked number 20 on IndieWire's list of films with "The Best Cinematography of the 21st Century," writing that Kaminski created "a rapturous sense of glossy romanticism in every frame, placing his characters in theatrical pools of light and making the most of production design and costumes that span the entire color wheel," giving the film "an almost magical quality on par with the finest musicals of MGM’s heyday." The site also ranked it at number 52 on its list of "The 63 Best Movie Musicals of All Time."

It ranked number 13 on Screen Rant's list of "The 35 Best Musicals of All Time" with the site calling it "one of Spielberg's best films of the 21st century," alongside Catch Me If You Can (2002), Bridge of Spies (2015) and The Fabelmans (2022). It also tied for number 3, alongside the 1961 film, on Parade's list of the "67 Best Movie Musicals of All Time." Time Out also ranked it number 3 on its list of "The 40 best musical movies of all time," calling it "breathtaking in its scope." It also tied with the 1961 film at number 1 on MovieWeb's list of "The Best Musical Movie Adaptations," saying that both films cemented their source material's status as "a truly legendary musical." The site also ranked it at number 2 on its list of the "Best Recent Musical Movies," calling it "a total knockout and fans of the original will have no problem coming to love it, which is really the true indicator of a successful remake." Collider ranked it number 5 on its list of "The 30 Best Musicals of All Time," writing that "Spielberg breathed a ton of life into the way this version of the story looks and feels, and for featuring more authentic dialogue, more accurate casting, and a few subtle story tweaks, it arguably stands as an even stronger film than the 1961 version."

Critic Matt Zoller Seitz of RogerEbert.com has since stated that West Side Story is a "turbocharged light and sound spectacular that's probably the best film musical since All That Jazz", adding that "All That Jazz is my favorite movie, so I don't make this statement lightly." In February 2025, The Washington Post ranked the film at number 3 on its list of "The 25 best movie musicals of the 21st century," with Ty Burr writing:

We'll always have the 1961 original, but Steven Spielberg's remake is simply the better-made movie: dramatically richer (thanks to Tony Kushner's script), better acted (aside from Ansel Elgort's pallid Tony), more visually kinetic, less ethnically bogus. It retains the choreographic DNA of the stage version but grounds the characters' pain in a neighborhood falling to the wrecking ball.

In June 2025, Zegler cited the film as among her favorites of the 21st century.

== Accolades ==
West Side Story received several awards and nominations. At the 94th Academy Awards, the film was nominated in seven categories, including Best Picture. It became the second adaptation of a source material for a previous Best Picture winner to be nominated for the same award after 1962's Mutiny on the Bounty. With his Best Picture nod, Spielberg became the most-nominated individual in the category with eleven films, and his Best Director nomination also made him the first filmmaker to be nominated in that category across six consecutive decades. Paul Tazewell became the first African American male costume designer to be nominated for Best Costume Design for his work on the film.

At the 79th Golden Globe Awards, it won three awards out of four nominations, including Best Motion Picture – Musical or Comedy. Zegler made history as the first actress of Colombian descent/Latina to win Best Actress – Motion Picture Comedy or Musical for her performance as María, as well as the youngest winner in the category at 20 years old. It also tied with Belfast for a leading eleven nominations at the 27th Critics' Choice Awards, including Best Picture, and won two awards, including Best Editing. It additionally received five nominations at the 75th British Academy Film Awards, including Best Actor in a Supporting Role for Faist, and won two awards, including Best Casting.

DeBose became the first Afro-Latina and openly queer woman of color to win the Academy Award for Best Supporting Actress and the Screen Actors Guild Award for Outstanding Performance by a Female Actor in a Supporting Role for her performance as Anita. With Moreno also having won the aforementioned award, DeBose's win matched a record for the most acting Oscar wins for the same character after Marlon Brando and Robert De Niro's portrayals of Vito Corleone and Heath Ledger and Joaquin Phoenix's portrayals of the Joker, while also being the first time it went to a pair of actresses who played the same part and in the same category. DeBose also won the Golden Globe Award for Best Supporting Actress – Motion Picture, the BAFTA Award for Best Actress in a Supporting Role, and the Critics' Choice Movie Award for Best Supporting Actress.

== Differences between film and stage versions ==
- The film's screenplay hews more closely to the Broadway script of West Side Story than to the 1961 film adaptation written by Ernest Lehman. Moreno, who played Anita in the 1961 film, plays Valentina, the wife of the stage play character Doc; Valentina is also a reconceived and expanded version of Doc's role, which is as a mentor to the younger characters.
- An African American character named Abe was added to the cast. According to Spielberg, this was done to reflect the ethnic diversity of 1950s New York.
- María and Bernardo are given the surname Vasquez.
- Tony is given a violent past, having spent time in jail because he almost killed someone.
- Anybodys, who is portrayed as a tomboy desperate to become a Jet in the stage show and 1961 film, is portrayed as a transgender man in this version.
- Ice (Riff's second-in-command in the films), and Diesel (Riff's second-in-command in the 1957 stage play), are both in this film as separate characters.
- Peck's choreography is original and does not attempt to replicate Jerome Robbins' choreography.
- Some scenes are played out in Spanish or a mix of Spanish and English with no subtitles providing translation. Spielberg further explained that the decision to not subtitle the Spanish dialogue was done "out of respect for the inclusivity of our intentions to hire a totally Latinx cast to play the Sharks' boys and girls. ... If I subtitled the Spanish I'd simply be doubling down on the English and giving English the power over the Spanish. This was not going to happen in this film, I needed to respect the language enough not to subtitle it".
- The film includes some of Shakespeare's lines from The Tragedy of Romeo and Juliet, but adapted. When María kisses Tony, he says “You just caught me by surprise is all. I’m a by the book type." On the fire escape, María tells Tony to wait before he can leave, but then says “I forgot why I called you,” and he replies, “I’ll wait till you remember.”
- The film follows the song order of the Broadway script, except that both "Gee, Officer Krupke" and "Cool" are performed in the first half, with "One Hand, One Heart" appearing in between.
- The locations where some of the songs take place, as well as some of their contexts, are also changed for this version.
  - Tony sings "Cool" to Riff to convince the Jets not to fight at the rumble that evening, while playing keep away with the gun bought by Riff, instead of Riff singing it to encourage the Jets to stay cool during the war council at Doc's Drug Store or Ice singing it in the aftermath of Riff's death.
  - "America" takes place the day after the neighborhood dance, on the streets of the Sharks' community in New York City, rather than on the rooftop of María and Bernardo's apartment on the same night of the dance, as seen in the stage show and 1961 film. It also uses more of the 1961 film's lyrics than the original stage show version and speaks of Puerto Rico in a more positive light while still conveying the message that Anita prefers to stay in America.
  - "I Feel Pretty" takes place at the Gimbels department store in this version, instead of María's bedroom in the stage show and the bridal shop in the 1961 film. In addition, the song appears after the rumble, like in the stage show, whereas in the 1961 film, it is sung before the rumble. This recontextualization resolved Sondheim's often-stated misgivings about the suitability of this song within the show.
  - "Gee, Officer Krupke" takes place in a police station instead of an alley.
  - Instead of the bridal shop, María and Tony sing "One Hand, One Heart" in the Church of the Intercession as part of their date, which also involves visiting The Cloisters.
  - The context of "Something's Coming" is slightly changed to reflect the character background change for Tony. In the stage show and 1961 film, Tony has the feeling that "something great" is just around the corner, like he tells Riff. In the 2021 film, Valentina tries to get Tony to pick himself up and start again despite his past difficulties. She gives him the confidence that launches him into singing the song.
- The rumble takes place in a salt warehouse instead of under a highway.
- The dream ballet associated with "Somewhere" is omitted, as in the 1961 film. The orchestration of its music, called "Scherzo", follows the balcony scene inside María's bedroom where she reacts to the joy of her romance. Later, "Somewhere" is sung by Valentina.
- As Tony dies in the finale, María sings a brief reprise of "Tonight" in this version, instead of "Somewhere".
