= List of accolades received by West Side Story (2021 film) =

Awards received by West Side Story

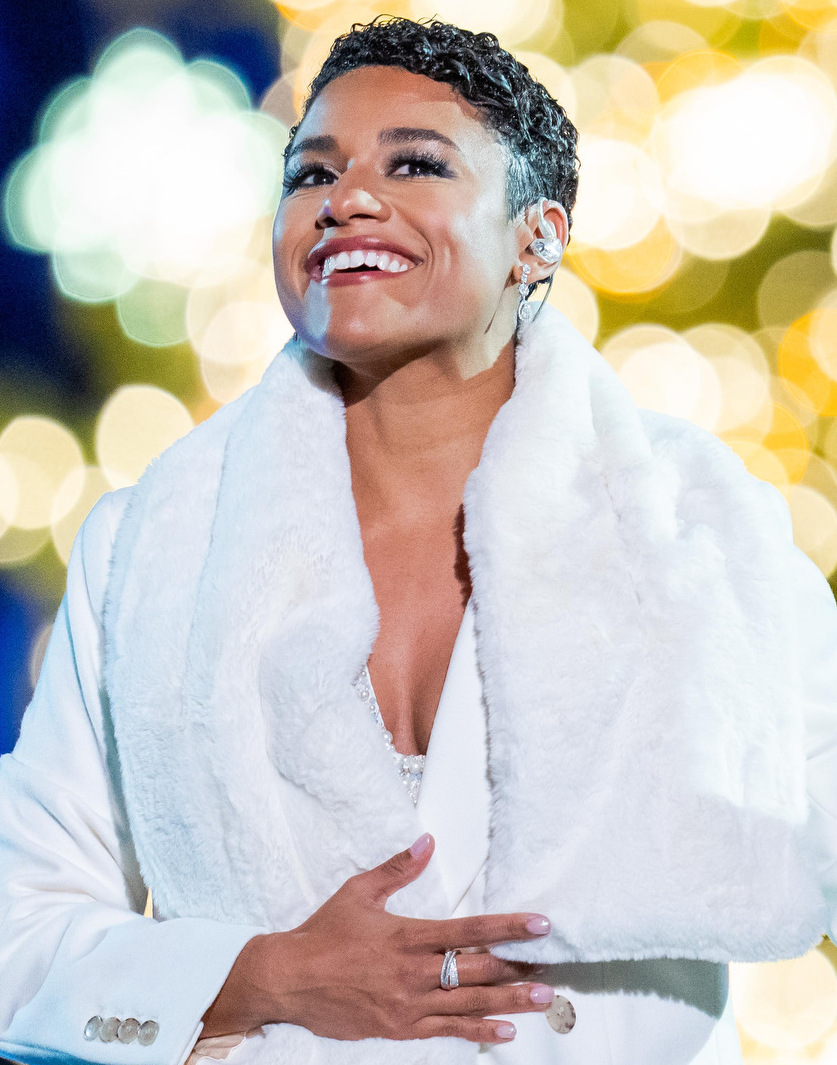
- Ariana DeBose garnered widespread acclaim for her performance in the film.
Accolades
| Award | Wins | Nominations |
| AARP Movies for Grownups Awards | 1 | 6 |
| Academy Awards | 1 | 7 |
| ADG Excellence in Production Design Awards | 0 | 1 |
| African-American Film Critics Association | 1 | 2 |
| Alliance of Women Film Journalists | 0 | 3 |
| American Film Institute Awards | 1 | 1 |
| Austin Film Critics Association | 0 | 4 |
| Black Reel Awards | 1 | 7 |
| British Academy Film Awards | 2 | 5 |
| British Society of Cinematographers | 1 | 1 |
| Casting Society of America | 0 | 1 |
| Capri Hollywood International Film Festival | 2 | 2 |
| Chicago Film Critics Association | 0 | 11 |
| Cinema Audio Society Awards | 0 | 1 |
| Cinema Writers Circle Awards | 0 | 1 |
| Costume Designers Guild Awards | 0 | 1 |
| Critics' Choice Awards | 2 | 11 |
| Dallas–Fort Worth Film Critics Association | 1 | 3 |
| Detroit Film Critics Society | 1 | 3 |
| Directors Guild of America Awards | 0 | 1 |
| Dorian Awards | 3 | 8 |
| Dublin Film Critics' Circle | 0 | 2 |
| Florida Film Critics Circle | 4 | 6 |
| Georgia Film Critics Association | 1 | 7 |
| GLAAD Media Awards | 0 | 1 |
| Golden Globe Awards | 3 | 4 |
| Golden Reel Awards | 1 | 1 |
| Grammy Awards | 0 | 1 |
| Hollywood Critics Association | 1 | 4 |
| Houston Film Critics Society | 0 | 2 |
| Imagen Awards | 1 | 6 |
| IndieWire Critics Poll | 0 | 2 |
| International Cinephile Society | 0 | 2 |
| International Film Music Critics Association | 1 | 1 |
| London Film Critics' Circle | 0 | 4 |
| Los Angeles Film Critics Association | 1 | 1 |
| Make-Up Artists and Hair Stylists Guild Awards | 0 | 1 |
| MTV Movie & TV Awards | 0 | 2 |
| NAACP Image Awards | 0 | 1 |
| National Board of Review | 2 | 2 |
| New York Film Critics Circle | 1 | 1 |
| New York Film Critics Online | 3 | 3 |
| Producers Guild of America Awards | 0 | 1 |
| The Queerties | 0 | 3 |
| The ReFrame Stamp | 1 | 1 |
| San Diego Film Critics Society | 2 | 2 |
| San Francisco Bay Area Film Critics Circle | 0 | 5 |
| Santa Barbara International Film Festival | 2 | 2 |
| Saturn Awards | 0 | 2 |
| Screen Actors Guild Awards | 1 | 1 |
| Seattle Film Critics Society | 1 | 5 |
| Set Decorators Society of America Awards | 0 | 1 |
| Society of Camera Operators Awards | 1 | 1 |
| St. Louis Film Critics Association | 0 | 9 |
| Washington D.C. Area Film Critics Association | 0 | 6 |
| Writers Guild of America Awards | 0 | 1 |

Totals (Note: Certain award groups do not simply award one winner. They acknowledge several different recipients, have runners-up, and have third place. Since this is a specific recognition and is different from losing an award, runner-up mentions are considered wins in this award tally. For simplification and to avoid errors, each award in this list has been presumed to have had a prior nomination.)
- Wins: 43
- Nominations: 173

West Side Story is a 2021 American musical romantic drama film directed and co-produced by Steven Spielberg from a screenplay by Tony Kushner. It is the second feature-length adaptation of the 1957 stage musical of the same name. It stars Ansel Elgort and Rachel Zegler in her film debut with Ariana DeBose, David Alvarez, Mike Faist, and Rita Moreno in supporting roles. Moreno, who starred in the 1961 film adaptation, also served as an executive producer, alongside Kushner. The film features music composed by Leonard Bernstein, with lyrics by Stephen Sondheim.

West Side Story had its world premiere at Jazz at Lincoln Center's Rose Theater in New York City on November 29, 2021, three days after the death of Sondheim. The movie was theatrically distributed by Walt Disney Studios Motion Pictures through the 20th Century Studios label in the United States on December 10, after being delayed a year due to the COVID-19 pandemic. The film received critical and audience acclaim alike, with praise for its acting and musical performances, Spielberg's direction, and the cinematography, with some critics deeming it superior to the 1961 film. It was named one of the top ten films of 2021 by the National Board of Review and the American Film Institute.

At the 94th Academy Awards, the film has received seven nominations, including Best Picture. It became the second adaptation of the same source material for a previous Best Picture winner to be nominated for the same award after 1962's Mutiny on the Bounty. With his Best Picture nod, Spielberg became the most nominated individual in the category with eleven films. Spielberg's Best Director nomination also made him the first filmmaker to be nominated in that category in six consecutive decades. Paul Tazewell became the first African American male costume designer to be nominated for Best Costume Design for his work on the film.

At the 79th Golden Globe Awards, it received four nominations and three wins, including Best Motion Picture – Musical or Comedy. Zegler made history as the first actress of Colombian descent/Latina to win Best Actress – Motion Picture Comedy or Musical for her performance as Maria as well as becoming the youngest winner in that category at 20 years old. It also tied with Belfast for a leading eleven nominations at the 27th Critics' Choice Awards, including Best Picture, and won two awards, including Best Editing. In addition, it received five nominations at the 75th British Academy Film Awards, including Best Actor in a Supporting Role for Faist, and won two awards, including Best Casting.

For her performance as Anita, DeBose became the first Afro-Latina and openly queer woman of color to win the Academy Award for Best Supporting Actress and the Screen Actors Guild Award for Outstanding Performance by a Female Actor in a Supporting Role. With Moreno also having won the same aforementioned award, DeBose's win matched a record for the most acting Oscar wins for the same character after Marlon Brando and Robert De Niro's portrayals of Vito Corleone and Heath Ledger and Joaquin Phoenix's portrayals of the Joker with it also being the first time it went to a pair of actresses who played the same part and in the same category. DeBose also won the Golden Globe Award for Best Supporting Actress – Motion Picture, the BAFTA Award for Best Actress in a Supporting Role, and the Critics' Choice Movie Award for Best Supporting Actress.

== Accolades ==
| Award | Date of ceremony | Category | Recipient(s) | Results | Ref. |
|---|---|---|---|---|---|
| AARP Movies for Grownups Awards | March 18, 2022 | Best Picture | West Side Story | Nominated | |
| AARP Movies for Grownups Awards | March 18, 2022 | Best Director | Steven Spielberg | Nominated | |
| AARP Movies for Grownups Awards | March 18, 2022 | Best Supporting Actress | Rita Moreno | Nominated | |
| AARP Movies for Grownups Awards | March 18, 2022 | Best Screenwriter | Tony Kushner | Won | |
| AARP Movies for Grownups Awards | March 18, 2022 | Best Ensemble | West Side Story | Nominated | |
| AARP Movies for Grownups Awards | March 18, 2022 | Best Time Capsule | West Side Story | Nominated | |
| Academy Awards | March 27, 2022 | Best Picture | Steven Spielberg and Kristie Macosko Krieger | Nominated | |
| Academy Awards | March 27, 2022 | Best Director | Steven Spielberg | Nominated | |
| Academy Awards | March 27, 2022 | Best Supporting Actress | Ariana DeBose | Won | |
| Academy Awards | March 27, 2022 | Best Cinematography | Janusz Kamiński | Nominated | |
| Academy Awards | March 27, 2022 | Best Costume Design | Paul Tazewell | Nominated | |
| Academy Awards | March 27, 2022 | Best Production Design | Adam Stockhausen and Rena DeAngelo | Nominated | |
| Academy Awards | March 27, 2022 | Best Sound | Tod A. Maitland, Gary Rydstrom, Brian Chumney, Andy Nelson and Shawn Murphy | Nominated | |
| ADG Excellence in Production Design Awards | March 5, 2022 | Excellence in Production Design for a Period Film | Adam Stockhausen | Nominated | |
| African-American Film Critics Association | December 8, 2021 | Top Ten Films | West Side Story | Won | |
| African-American Film Critics Association | December 8, 2021 | Best Picture | West Side Story | Nominated | |
| Alliance of Women Film Journalists | January 25, 2022 | EDA Award - Best Film Editing | Sarah Broshar; Michael Kahn | Nominated | |
| Alliance of Women Film Journalists | January 25, 2022 | EDA Female Focus Award - Best Breakthrough Performance | Ariana DeBose | Nominated | |
| Alliance of Women Film Journalists | January 25, 2022 | EDA Female Focus Award - Best Breakthrough Performance | Rachel Zegler | Nominated | |
| American Film Institute Awards | January 7, 2022 | Top 10 Movies of the Year | West Side Story | Won | |
| Austin Film Critics Association | January 11, 2022 | Best Supporting Actress | Ariana DeBose | Nominated | |
| Austin Film Critics Association | January 11, 2022 | Best Cinematography | Janusz Kamiński | Nominated | |
| Austin Film Critics Association | January 11, 2022 | Best Film Editing | Sarah Broshar Michael Kahn | Nominated | |
| Austin Film Critics Association | January 11, 2022 | Breakthrough Artist Award | Ariana DeBose | Nominated | |
| Black Reel Awards | February 28, 2022 | Outstanding Film | West Side Story | Nominated | |
| Black Reel Awards | February 28, 2022 | Outstanding Supporting Actress | Ariana DeBose | Nominated | |
| Black Reel Awards | February 28, 2022 | Outstanding Supporting Actress | Rita Moreno | Nominated | |
| Black Reel Awards | February 28, 2022 | Outstanding Breakthrough Performance, Female | Ariana DeBose | Won | |
| Black Reel Awards | February 28, 2022 | Outstanding Cinematography | Janusz Kamiński | Nominated | |
| Black Reel Awards | February 28, 2022 | Outstanding Costume Design | Paul Tazewell | Nominated | |
| Black Reel Awards | February 28, 2022 | Outstanding Production Design | Adam Stockhausen | Nominated | |
| British Academy Film Awards | March 13, 2022 | Best Actor in a Supporting Role | Mike Faist | Nominated | |
| British Academy Film Awards | March 13, 2022 | Best Actress in a Supporting Role | Ariana DeBose | Won | |
| British Academy Film Awards | March 13, 2022 | Best Casting | Cindy Tolan | Won | |
| British Academy Film Awards | March 13, 2022 | Best Production Design | Adam Stockhausen and Rena DeAngelo | Nominated | |
| British Academy Film Awards | March 13, 2022 | Best Sound | Brian Chumney, Tod Maitland, Andy Nelson and Gary Rydstrom | Nominated | |
| British Society of Cinematographers | February 26, 2022 | Feature Film - Best Camera Operator | Mitch Dubin and John S. Moyer | Won | |
| Capri Hollywood International Film Festival | January 7, 2022 | Best Supporting Actress | Ariana DeBose | Won | |
| Capri Hollywood International Film Festival | January 7, 2022 | Best Ensemble Cast | Cast of West Side Story | Won | |
| Casting Society of America | March 23, 2022 | Feature Big Budget – Drama | Cindy Tolan and Nicholas Petrovich | Won | |
| Chicago Film Critics Association | December 15, 2021 | Best Film | West Side Story | Nominated | |
| Chicago Film Critics Association | December 15, 2021 | Best Director | Steven Spielberg | Nominated | |
| Chicago Film Critics Association | December 15, 2021 | Best Supporting Actor | Mike Faist | Nominated | |
| Chicago Film Critics Association | December 15, 2021 | Best Supporting Actress | Ariana DeBose | Nominated | |
| Chicago Film Critics Association | December 15, 2021 | Best Adapted Screenplay | Tony Kushner | Nominated | |
| Chicago Film Critics Association | December 15, 2021 | Best Art Direction/Production Design | West Side Story | Nominated | |
| Chicago Film Critics Association | December 15, 2021 | Best Costume Design | Paul Tazewell | Nominated | |
| Chicago Film Critics Association | December 15, 2021 | Best Editing | Michael Kahn; Sarah Broshar | Nominated | |
| Chicago Film Critics Association | December 15, 2021 | Best Cinematography | Janusz Kamiński | Nominated | |
| Chicago Film Critics Association | December 15, 2021 | Most Promising Performer | Rachel Zegler | Nominated | |
| Chicago Film Critics Association | December 15, 2021 | Most Promising Performer | Ariana DeBose | Nominated | |
| Cinema Audio Society Awards | March 19, 2022 | Outstanding Sound Mixing in a Motion Picture – Live Action | Tod Maitland, Andy Nelson, Gary Rydstrom, Shawn Murphy, Doc Kane and Frank Rinella | Nominated | |
| Cinema Writers Circle Awards | February 9, 2022 | Best Foreign Film | West Side Story | Nominated | |
| Costume Designers Guild Awards | March 9, 2022 | Excellence in Period Film | Paul Tazewell | Nominated | |
| Critics' Choice Movie Awards | March 13, 2022 | Best Picture | West Side Story | Nominated | |
| Critics' Choice Movie Awards | March 13, 2022 | Best Supporting Actress | Ariana DeBose | Won | |
| Critics' Choice Movie Awards | March 13, 2022 | Best Supporting Actress | Rita Moreno | Nominated | |
| Critics' Choice Movie Awards | March 13, 2022 | Best Young Performer | Rachel Zegler | Nominated | |
| Critics' Choice Movie Awards | March 13, 2022 | Best Acting Ensemble | West Side Story | Nominated | |
| Critics' Choice Movie Awards | March 13, 2022 | Best Director | Steven Spielberg | Nominated | |
| Critics' Choice Movie Awards | March 13, 2022 | Best Adapted Screenplay | Tony Kushner | Nominated | |
| Critics' Choice Movie Awards | March 13, 2022 | Best Cinematography | Janusz Kamiński | Nominated | |
| Critics' Choice Movie Awards | March 13, 2022 | Best Production Design | Adam Stockhausen and Rena DeAngelo | Nominated | |
| Critics' Choice Movie Awards | March 13, 2022 | Best Editing | Sarah Broshar and Michael Kahn | Won | |
| Critics' Choice Movie Awards | March 13, 2022 | Best Costume Design | Paul Tazewell | Nominated | |
| Dallas–Fort Worth Film Critics Association | December 20, 2021 | Best Picture | West Side Story | Nominated | |
| Dallas–Fort Worth Film Critics Association | December 20, 2021 | Best Director | Steven Spielberg | Nominated | |
| Dallas–Fort Worth Film Critics Association | December 20, 2021 | Best Supporting Actress | Ariana DeBose | Won | |
| Detroit Film Critics Society | December 6, 2021 | Best Supporting Actress | Ariana DeBose | Won | |
| Detroit Film Critics Society | December 6, 2021 | Best Supporting Actress | Rita Moreno | Nominated | |
| Detroit Film Critics Society | December 6, 2021 | Best Use of Music/Sound | West Side Story | Nominated | |
| Directors Guild of America Awards | March 12, 2022 | Outstanding Directing - Feature Film | Steven Spielberg | Nominated | |
| Dorian Awards | March 17, 2022 | Best Film | West Side Story | Nominated | |
| Dorian Awards | March 17, 2022 | Best Director | Steven Spielberg | Nominated | |
| Dorian Awards | March 17, 2022 | Best Supporting Film Performance | Ariana DeBose | Won | |
| Dorian Awards | March 17, 2022 | Best Supporting Film Performance | Mike Faist | Nominated | |
| Dorian Awards | March 17, 2022 | Most Visually Striking Film | West Side Story | Nominated | |
| Dorian Awards | March 17, 2022 | "We're Wilde About You" Rising Star | Ariana DeBose | Won | |
| Dorian Awards | March 17, 2022 | "We're Wilde About You" Rising Star | Rachel Zegler | Nominated | |
| Dorian Awards | March 17, 2022 | Timeless Star | Rita Moreno | Won | |
| Dublin Film Critics' Circle | December 21, 2021 | Best Director | Steven Spielberg | Nominated | |
| Dublin Film Critics' Circle | December 21, 2021 | Best Cinematography | Janusz Kamiński | Nominated | |
| Florida Film Critics Circle | December 21, 2021 | Best Supporting Actress | Ariana DeBose | Won | |
| Florida Film Critics Circle | December 21, 2021 | Best Ensemble | West Side Story | Nominated | |
| Florida Film Critics Circle | December 21, 2021 | Best Adapted Screenplay | Tony Kushner | Runner-up (Note: Tied with Steven Levenson for tick, tick... BOOM!) | |
| Florida Film Critics Circle | December 21, 2021 | Best Cinematography | Janusz Kamiński | Runner-up (Note: Tied with Claire Mathon for Spencer) | |
| Florida Film Critics Circle | December 21, 2021 | Best Art Direction/Production | West Side Story | Nominated | |
| Florida Film Critics Circle | December 21, 2021 | Breakout Award | Rachel Zegler | Runner-up | |
| Georgia Film Critics Association | January 15, 2022 | Best Picture | West Side Story | Nominated | |
| Georgia Film Critics Association | January 15, 2022 | Best Director | Steven Spielberg | Nominated | |
| Georgia Film Critics Association | January 15, 2022 | Best Actress | Rachel Zegler | Nominated | |
| Georgia Film Critics Association | January 15, 2022 | Best Supporting Actress | Ariana DeBose | Won | |
| Georgia Film Critics Association | January 15, 2022 | Best Adapted Screenplay | Tony Kushner | Nominated | |
| Georgia Film Critics Association | January 15, 2022 | Best Cinematography | Janusz Kamiński | Nominated | |
| Georgia Film Critics Association | January 15, 2022 | Breakthrough Award | Rachel Zegler | Nominated | |
| GLAAD Media Awards | April 2, 2022; May 6, 2022 | Outstanding Film – Wide Release | West Side Story | Nominated | |
| Golden Globe Awards | January 9, 2022 | Best Motion Picture – Musical or Comedy | West Side Story | Won | |
| Golden Globe Awards | January 9, 2022 | Best Actress in a Motion Picture – Musical or Comedy | Rachel Zegler | Won | |
| Golden Globe Awards | January 9, 2022 | Best Supporting Actress – Motion Picture | Ariana DeBose | Won | |
| Golden Globe Awards | January 9, 2022 | Best Director – Motion Picture | Steven Spielberg | Nominated | |
| Golden Reel Awards | March 13, 2022 | Outstanding Sound Editing – Feature Music | Joe E. Rand, Ramiro Belgardt, and David Channing | Won | |
| Grammy Awards | February 5, 2023 | Best Compilation Soundtrack for Visual Media | Various Artists | Nominated | |
| Hollywood Critics Association Awards | February 28, 2022 | Best Comedy or Musical | West Side Story | Nominated | |
| Hollywood Critics Association Awards | February 28, 2022 | Best Director | Steven Spielberg | Nominated | |
| Hollywood Critics Association Awards | February 28, 2022 | Best Supporting Actress | Ariana DeBose | Won | |
| Hollywood Critics Association Awards | February 28, 2022 | Best Cinematography | Janusz Kamiński | Nominated | |
| Houston Film Critics Society | January 19, 2022 | Best Supporting Actress | Ariana DeBose | Nominated | |
| Houston Film Critics Society | January 19, 2022 | Best Cinematography | Janusz Kamiński | Nominated | |
| Imagen Awards | October 2, 2022 | Best Feature Film | West Side Story | Nominated | |
| Imagen Awards | October 2, 2022 | Best Director – Feature Film | Steven Spielberg | Nominated | |
| Imagen Awards | October 2, 2022 | Best Actor – Feature Film | David Alvarez | Nominated | |
| Imagen Awards | October 2, 2022 | Best Actress – Feature Film | Ariana DeBose | Won | |
| Imagen Awards | October 2, 2022 | Best Actress – Feature Film | Rita Moreno | Nominated | |
| Imagen Awards | October 2, 2022 | Best Actress – Feature Film | Rachel Zegler | Nominated | |
| IndieWire Critics Poll | December 13, 2021 | Best Director | Steven Spielberg | Nominated | |
| IndieWire Critics Poll | December 13, 2021 | Best Cinematography | Janusz Kamiński | Nominated | |
| International Cinephile Society | February 6, 2022 | Best Picture | West Side Story | Nominated | |
| International Cinephile Society | February 6, 2022 | Best Supporting Actress | Ariana DeBose | Nominated | |
| International Film Music Critics Association | February 17, 2022 | Kyle Renick Special Award | West Side Story | Won | |
| London Film Critics' Circle | February 6, 2022 | Film of the Year | West Side Story | Nominated | |
| London Film Critics' Circle | February 6, 2022 | Best Supporting Actress | Ariana DeBose | Nominated | |
| London Film Critics' Circle | February 6, 2022 | Best Supporting Actress | Rita Moreno | Nominated | |
| London Film Critics' Circle | February 6, 2022 | Technical Achievement Award | Justin Peck | Nominated | |
| Los Angeles Film Critics Association | December 18, 2021 | Best Supporting Actress | Ariana DeBose | Won | |
| Make-Up Artists and Hair Stylists Guild Awards | February 19, 2022 | Best Period Hair Styling and/or Character Hair Styling | Kay Georgiou and Jerry DeCarlo | Nominated | |
| MTV Movie & TV Awards | June 5, 2022 | Best Breakthrough Performance | Ariana DeBose | Nominated | |
| MTV Movie & TV Awards | June 5, 2022 | Best Musical Moment | "America" | Nominated | |
| NAACP Image Awards | February 26, 2022 | Outstanding Breakthrough Performance in a Motion Picture | Ariana DeBose | Nominated | |
| National Board of Review | December 2, 2021 | Top Ten Films | West Side Story | Won | |
| National Board of Review | December 2, 2021 | Best Actress | Rachel Zegler | Won | |
| New York Film Critics Circle | December 3, 2021 | Best Cinematography | Janusz Kamiński | Won | |
| New York Film Critics Online | December 12, 2021 | Top 10 Films of 2021 | West Side Story | Won | |
| New York Film Critics Online | December 12, 2021 | Breakthrough Performance | Ariana DeBose | Won | |
| New York Film Critics Online | December 12, 2021 | Best Use of Music | David Newman | Won | |
| Producers Guild of America Awards | March 19, 2022 | Outstanding Producer of Theatrical Motion Pictures | Steven Spielberg and Kristie Macosko Krieger | Nominated | |
| The Queerties | February 24, 2021 | Next Big Thing | West Side Story | Nominated | |
| The Queerties | March 1, 2022 | Studio Movie | West Side Story | Nominated | |
| The Queerties | March 1, 2022 | Film Performance | Ariana DeBose | Runner-up | |
| ReFrame | March 1, 2022 | The ReFrame Stamp | West Side Story | Won | |
| St. Louis Film Critics Association | December 19, 2021 | Best Film | West Side Story | Nominated | |
| St. Louis Film Critics Association | December 19, 2021 | Best Director | Steven Spielberg | Nominated | |
| St. Louis Film Critics Association | December 19, 2021 | Best Supporting Actress | Rita Moreno | Nominated | |
| St. Louis Film Critics Association | December 19, 2021 | Best Adapted Screenplay | West Side Story | Nominated | |
| St. Louis Film Critics Association | December 19, 2021 | Best Cinematography | Janusz Kamiński | Nominated | |
| St. Louis Film Critics Association | December 19, 2021 | Best Editing | Sarah Broshar; Michael Kahn | Nominated | |
| St. Louis Film Critics Association | December 19, 2021 | Best Production Design | Adam Stockhausen | Nominated | |
| St. Louis Film Critics Association | December 19, 2021 | Best Scene | "America" | Nominated | |
| St. Louis Film Critics Association | December 19, 2021 | Best Soundtrack | West Side Story | Nominated | |
| San Diego Film Critics Society | January 10, 2022 | Best Supporting Actress | Ariana DeBose | Runner-up | |
| San Diego Film Critics Society | January 10, 2022 | Best Best Use of Music | West Side Story | Runner-up (Note: Tied with Belfast and In the Heights) | |
| San Francisco Bay Area Film Critics Circle | January 10, 2022 | Best Picture | West Side Story | Nominated | |
| San Francisco Bay Area Film Critics Circle | January 10, 2022 | Best Director | Steven Spielberg | Nominated | |
| San Francisco Bay Area Film Critics Circle | January 10, 2022 | Best Supporting Actress | Ariana DeBose | Nominated | |
| San Francisco Bay Area Film Critics Circle | January 10, 2022 | Best Cinematography | Janusz Kamiński | Nominated | |
| San Francisco Bay Area Film Critics Circle | January 10, 2022 | Best Film Editing | Sarah Broshar; Michael Kahn | Nominated | |
| Santa Barbara International Film Festival | March 5, 2022 | Virtuosos Award | Ariana DeBose | Won | |
| Santa Barbara International Film Festival | March 5, 2022 | Outstanding Directors of the Year | Steven Spielberg | Won | |
| Saturn Awards | October 25, 2022 | Best Action/Adventure Film | West Side Story | Nominated | |
| Saturn Awards | October 25, 2022 | Best Director | Steven Spielberg | Nominated | |
| Screen Actors Guild Awards | February 27, 2022 | Outstanding Supporting Actress in a Motion Picture | Ariana DeBose | Won | |
| Seattle Film Critics Society | January 17, 2022 | Best Picture | West Side Story | Nominated | |
| Seattle Film Critics Society | January 17, 2022 | Best Supporting Actress | Ariana DeBose | Won | |
| Seattle Film Critics Society | January 17, 2022 | Best Cinematography | Janusz Kamiński | Nominated | |
| Seattle Film Critics Society | January 17, 2022 | Best Film Editing | Sarah Broshar and Michael Kahn | Nominated | |
| Seattle Film Critics Society | January 17, 2022 | Best Production Design | Adam Stockhausen and Rena DeAngelo | Nominated | |
| Set Decorators Society of America | February 22, 2022 | Best Achievement in Decor/Design of a Comedy or Musical Feature Film | Adam Stockhausen and Rena DeAngelo | Nominated | |
| Society of Camera Operators Awards | March 5, 2022 | Camera Operator of the Year | Mitch Dubin and John S. Moyer | Won | |
| Washington D.C. Area Film Critics Association | December 6, 2021 | Best Film | West Side Story | Nominated | |
| Washington D.C. Area Film Critics Association | December 6, 2021 | Best Director | Steven Spielberg | Nominated | |
| Washington D.C. Area Film Critics Association | December 6, 2021 | Best Supporting Actress | Ariana DeBose | Nominated | |
| Washington D.C. Area Film Critics Association | December 6, 2021 | Best Youth Performance | Rachel Zegler | Nominated | |
| Washington D.C. Area Film Critics Association | December 6, 2021 | Best Adapted Screenplay | Tony Kushner | Nominated | |
| Washington D.C. Area Film Critics Association | December 6, 2021 | Best Production Design | Adam Stockhausen; Rena DeAngelo | Nominated | |
| Writers Guild of America Awards | March 20, 2022 | Best Adapted Screenplay | Tony Kushner | Nominated | |

== See also ==
- 2021 in film
