= Molli and Max in the Future =

2023 film by Michael Lukk Litwak

- Theatrical release poster
- Directed by: Michael Lukk Litwak
- Written by: Michael Lukk Litwak
- Produced by: Ben J. Murphy; Candice Kuwahara; Michael Lukk Litwak; Mallory Schwartz; Kate Geller
- Starring: Zosia Mamet; Aristotle Athari
- Cinematography: Zach Stoltzfus
- Edited by: Joanna Naugle
- Music by: Alex Winkler
- Production companies: Whiskey Bear Productions; The Family; Choreografx; DVRG; Senior Post
- Distributed by: Level 33 Entertainment
- Release dates: March 11, 2023 (SXSW); February 9, 2024 (United States)
- Running time: 93 minutes
- Country: United States
- Language: English

Molli and Max in the Future is a 2023 American science fiction romantic comedy film written and directed by Michael Lukk Litwak in their debut feature film, and stars Zosia Mamet and Aristotle Athari. It premiered at South by Southwest on March 11, 2023, and was released in select theaters in the United States on February 9, 2024, by Level 33 Entertainment.

== Synopsis ==
A billion years in the future, magic, sentient robots, and demigods exist. Meanwhile, Molli and Max bump into each other across the course of twelve years, four planets, three dimensions, and one space cult. One of them is able to fly, while the other is half-human/half-fish.

== Cast ==
- Zosia Mamet as Molli
- Aristotle Athari as Max
- Arturo Castro as Walter
- Michael Chernus as Turboschmuk
- Aparna Nancherla as Rachel
- Okieriete Onaodowan as Moebias
- Paloma Garcia-Lee as Cassie
- Erin Darke as MAR14
- Grace Kuhlenschmidt as Triangulon
- Matteo Lane as Bryan
- Danny Burstein as Max's dad
- Connie Shi as Janus
- Ben Warheit as @FartJuice69

== Production ==
Writer and director Michael Lukk Litwak described the project as an attempt to update a movie classic, saying "When Harry Met Sally…is a masterpiece and I love it, but I watched it and it felt kind of out of date". The film is a Whiskey Bear Production in association with Senior Post, The Family, and Choreografx. Producers are Ben J. Murphy, Candice Kuwahara, Mallory Schwartz, Litwak and Kate Geller. Co-producing the film are Ted Geoghegan and Ivy Lam, with Mamet and Athari also executive producing alongside Josh Senior, Jeanne Elfant Festa, Luke Murphy, and Nicole Murphy.

=== Filming ===
Filming took place in New York City. Principal photography wrapped in August 2022.

== Release ==
The film had its world premiere at South by Southwest on March 11, 2023. It was released in select theaters in the United States on February 9, 2024, by Level 33 Entertainment.

== Reception ==
On the review aggregator website Rotten Tomatoes, Molli and Max in the Future holds an approval rating of 98% based on 41 reviews, with an average rating of 7.2/10. The website's critic consensus reads, "More than making up in style and sheer creativity whatever it might lack in terms of budget, Molli and Max in the Future blends sci-fi and rom-com to wildly entertaining effect." Brian Tallerico, writing for RogerEbert.com, said its "creative spirit carries it through some rough narrative patches and is complemented by truly charming performances from its two leads". William Earl for Variety praised the "super-realistic dialogue" and Alex Winkler's "jazzy score", describing the film as "a clever, quirky take on the future".
