= Test (2026 film) =

- Directed by: Sam McConnell
- Written by: Brock Yurich
- Produced by: Julie Christeas; Daryl Freimark; Brock Yurich
- Starring: Brock Yurich; Matthew Morrison; Tammy Blanchard; Paloma Garcia-Lee
- Cinematography: Ava Benjamin Shorr
- Edited by: Jon Higgins
- Music by: Ronen Landa
- Production companies: Bridge Independent; Tandem Pictures
- Release date: June 3, 2026 (SXSW London)
- Running time: 113 minutes
- Country: United States
- Language: English

Test is a 2026 American sports drama film directed by Sam McConnell and written by Brock Yurich. Yurich stars alongside Matthew Morrison, Tammy Blanchard, and Paloma Garcia-Lee.

The film premiered at the SXSW London on June 3, 2026.

== Premise ==
A closeted small-town Ohio bodybuilder clashes with his devoutly religious mother as he navigates his gay identity and the dark world of performance-enhancing drugs under a renowned coach.

== Cast ==
- Brock Yurich as Eddie
- Matthew Morrison as Pastor Gregg
- Tammy Blanchard as Joanne
- Mike Edward as Mike
- Paloma Garcia-Lee as Abby

== Production ==
In November 2025, it was revealed that Sam McConnell had directed a sports drama film written by and starring Brock Yurich. Matthew Morrison, Tammy Blanchard, and Paloma Garcia-Lee rounded out the cast. The film was described as a "story about identity, ambition and the pressures of living up to expectations," that offers "a fresh perspective on the traditional sports drama."

The development and conceptual foundations of Test were heavily driven by screenwriter and star Brock Yurich's personal background as a gay competitive bodybuilder. Yurich conceived the semi-autobiographical screenplay after a mentor advised him to "write what you know" during a period of career struggle in Hollywood. Yurich sought to explore the complex intersection of queerness and bodybuilding, and homoeroticism in sports. McConnell and Yurich utilized the narrative to critique contemporary societal expectations of manhood and toxic masculinity, positioning bodybuilding as an ultimate performance of gender.

The teaser trailer for the film was released in May 2026.

== Release ==
Test premiered at the SXSW London on June 3, 2026. It had its Asian premiere at the Hong Kong Lesbian & Gay Film Festival on September 5, 2026, and was shown at Deauville Film Festival in France on September 9. In Canada, Test premiered on September 12, 2026 at the Vancouver Queer Film Festival. In October 2026, the film was acquired for a 2027 release by Dark Star Pictures.

== Critical response ==
The film received critical acclaim. On the review aggregator website Rotten Tomatoes, 100% of 14 critics' reviews are positive. David Rooney of The Hollywood Reporter praised Test, writing: "McConnell’s direction and Yurich’s script might occasionally be earnest to a fault, but the movie’s emotional authenticity and depth of compassion make it an affecting character study." Brian Bromberger from Bay Area Reporter called it "an earnest, grim meditation on the sport of amateur bodybuilding". In the official write-up for the film on the Frameline's website, Brock Yurich's portrayal of a closeted amateur bodybuilder was called "endearing," "volcanic," and "star-making".

=== Accolades ===
Year	Award	Category	Nominee(s)	Result	Ref.
2026	American Film Festival Awards	Festival Favorites	Sam McConnell	Nominated	
2026	Deauville American Film Festival Awards	Grand Prix	Sam McConnell	Nominated	
2026	Deauville American Film Festival Awards	Canal + Prize	Sam McConnell	Won	
2026	FilmOut San Diego Awards	Best First Narrative Feature	Sam McConnell	Won	
2026	FilmOut San Diego Awards	Best Lead Performance	Brock Yurich	Won	
2026	FilmOut San Diego Awards	Best Supporting Performance	Tammy Blanchard	Won	
2026	Frameline Awards	Outstanding First Narrative Feature	Sam McConnell	Won (Note: Tied with Leviticus.)	
2026	Hell's Half Mile Film & Music Festival Awards	Jury Award — Grand Jury Prize Feature	Sam McConnell	Won	
2026	Hell's Half Mile Film & Music Festival Awards	Jury Award — Feature Screenplay	Brock Yurich	Won	
2026	Hell's Half Mile Film & Music Festival Awards	Jury Award — Feature Cinematography	Ava Benjamin Shorr	Won	
2026	Hell's Half Mile Film & Music Festival Awards	Jury Award — Best Lead Performance (Feature)	Brock Yurich	Won	
2026	Hell's Half Mile Film & Music Festival Awards	Jury Award — Best Supporting Performance (Feature)	Tammy Blanchard	Won	
2026	Hell's Half Mile Film & Music Festival Awards	Audience Award — Fest Best	Sam McConnell	Won	
2026	Lone Star Film Festival	Best of Fest	Sam McConnell	Won	
2026	New Hampshire Film Festival Awards	Jury Award — Best Narrative Feature	Sam McConnell	Won	
2026	NewFest Awards	Grand Jury Award — U.S. Narrative Feature	Sam McConnell	Won	
2026	Nòt Film Fest Awards	Best Director	Sam McConnell	Won	
2026	Provincetown International Film Festival Awards	Best Narrative Feature/Audience Award	Sam McConnell	Won	
2026	Queer Screen Film Fest Awards	Emerging Narrative Feature Award	Sam McConnell	Won	
2026	Rehoboth Beach International Film Festival Awards	Best Feature Film	Sam McConnell	Won	
2026	Rehoboth Beach International Film Festival Awards	Best Producer	Daryl Freimark	Won (Note: Freimark was honored for his work on two films: McConnell's Test and Neil LaBute's Murderous.)	
2026	Warsaw International Film Festival Awards	Warsaw Grand Prix	Sam McConnell	Nominated	
