= Paloma Garcia-Lee =

American actress and dancer

- Paloma Garcia-Lee for Test at the Deauville American Film Festival 2026
- Born: April 26, 1991 (age 35); Minneapolis, Minnesota, U.S.
- Occupations: Actress, dancer
- Years active: 2008–present
- Spouse: Paul A. Schaefer (m. 2014)

Paloma Garcia-Lee (born April 26, 1991) is an American actress and dancer.

== Early life ==
Garcia-Lee was born in Minneapolis. She was raised in Newtown, Pennsylvania, where she attended St. Andrew's Catholic School until the fifth grade, being moved to homeschooling following the September 11 attacks. She would be trained in ballet by her mother Terri Garcia, a former Broadway dancer who performed as Francisca in a touring production of West Side Story. She began attending the University of North Carolina School of the Arts at the age of 14 to study ballet, but would ultimately graduate from their School of Drama in 2008. During her time at UNCSA, she would perform in a production of West Side Story as Graziella. Garcia-Lee would spend summers with dance companies such as the American Ballet Theatre and Complexions Contemporary Ballet to further study.

== Career ==
Garcia-Lee made her Broadway debut at the age of 17 in a production of The Phantom of the Opera in 2008. Other theatre credits include Nice Work If You Can Get It, On the Town, Natasha, Pierre & The Great Comet of 1812, Charlie and the Chocolate Factory, and Moulin Rouge!.

In 2019, Garcia-Lee appeared in the FX miniseries Fosse/Verdon. She would also be announced to be playing Graziella again in the Steven Spielberg theatrical film version of West Side Story. Garcia-Lee lobbied for the role, based on hers and her mother's histories with the musical. She auditioned in the fall of 2018, and secured the role in November. Garcia-Lee had previously been in contention for the role when the musical was revived in 2009, and would also decline offers to play the characters Mugsy and Anybodys in other productions in favor of playing Graziella.

In 2022, Garcia-Lee was announced as part of the cast of the science fiction romantic comedy Molli and Max in the Future, which premiered at the 2023 South by Southwest festival. In 2024, she would appear in episodes of the television shows Elsbeth, Doctor Odyssey and Star Wars: Skeleton Crew, as well as performed in a production of Nine at the Kennedy Center that August.

== Personal life ==
Garcia-Lee is married to actor Paul A. Schaefer, with whom she practiced an open marriage.

== Filmography ==
=== Film ===
Year	Title	Role	Notes
2021	West Side Story	Graziella	
2023	Molli and Max in the Future	Cassie	
2026	Test	Abby	

=== Television ===
Year	Title	Role	Notes
2019	Fosse/Verdon	Adrienne	Miniseries, 5 episodes
2024	Elsbeth	Lainey Belfort	1 episode
2024	Doctor Odyssey	Frankie	1 episode
2024	Star Wars: Skeleton Crew	Melna	1 episode
